= List of Oi! bands =

This is a list of notable punk rock bands who have been referred to or have had their music described as Oi!

- The 4-Skins
- The Adicts
- The Angelic Upstarts
- Anti-Heros
- Banlieue Rouge
- Bérurier Noir
- The Blaggers
- Blitz
- The Blood
- Böhse Onkelz (early)
- The Burial
- The Business
- Cobra
- Cock Sparrer
- Cockney Rejects
- Combat 84
- Close Shave
- Condemned 84
- Darkbuster
- The Discocks
- Dropkick Murphys (early)
- Eastern Youth (early)
- The Ejected
- The Exploited (early)
- Flatfoot 56
- Garotos Podres
- Hard Skin
- Heavy Metal Kids
- Infa Riot
- Iron Cross
- Klasse Kriminale
- Lower Class Brats
- The Macc Lads
- Mr Floppy
- Oi Polloi
- The Oppressed
- Orlík
- Oxymoron
- The Partisans
- Perkele
- Peter and the Test Tube Babies
- The Press
- Red Alert
- Red London
- Roger Miret and the Disasters
- SA (Samurai Attack)
- Sham 69
- Skrewdriver (early)
- Slaughter and the Dogs
- Sledgeback
- Splodgenessabounds
- Street Dogs
- Subculture
- The Templars
- Those Unknown
- Toy Dolls
- UK Subs
- U.S. Chaos
- The Violators
- The Warriors
- The Wretched Ones
