= Carry On Oi! =

Compilation album by various artists
- Released: 1981
- Recorded: Various
- Genre: Oi!; punk rock; hardcore punk
- Label: Secret

Various artists chronology
Strength Thru Oi! (1981)	Carry On Oi! (1981)	Oi! Oi! That's Yer Lot! (1982)

Carry On Oi! is a 1981 Oi! compilation album, featuring various artists and released by Secret Records. Also known as Oi 3!, it was compiled by Garry Bushell.

The album was the sequel to Oi! The Album (1980) and Strength Thru Oi! (1981), and was itself followed by Oi! Oi! That's Yer Lot! (1982).

== Track listing ==
1. "United" - Garry Johnson
2. "Dambusters March" - JJ All Stars
3. "Suburban Rebels" - The Business
4. "Each Dawn I Die" - Infa-Riot
5. "Arms Race" - The Partisans
6. "East End Kids" - The Ejected
7. "Transvestite" - Peter and the Test Tube Babies
8. "Nation on Fire" - Blitz
9. "King of the Jungle" - The Last Resort
10. "Tuckers Ruckers Ain't No Suckers" - The Gonads
11. "Evil" - 4 Skins
12. "Product" - The Business
13. "SPG" - Red Alert
14. "Guvnor's Man" - Oi The Comrade
15. "Maniac" - Peter and the Test Tube Babies
16. "What Am I Gonna Do" - The Ejected
17. "No U Turns" - The Partisans
18. "Youth" - Blitz
19. "Walk On" - Oi The Choir

== See also ==
- Oi! The Album
- Oi! Oi! That's Yer Lot!
- Strength Thru Oi!
- Son of Oi!
