= Oi! Oi! That's Yer Lot! =

Compilation album by various artists
- Released: 1982
- Recorded: Various
- Genres: Oi!; punk
- Label: Secret

Various artists chronology
Carry On Oi! (1981)	Oi! Oi! That's Yer Lot! (1982)	Son of Oi! (1983)

Oi! Oi! That's Yer Lot! is a 1982 Oi! compilation album, featuring various artists and released by Secret Records. It is also known as Oi/4.

Compiled by Garry Bushell, the album was the sequel to Oi! The Album (1980), Strength Thru Oi! (Oi 2, 1981) and Carry On Oi! (Oi 3!, 1981). The title derives from the catchphrase of comedian Jimmy Wheeler.

== Track listing ==
1. "Real Enemy" - The Business
2. "Dr Crippens" - Five 0
3. "White Flag" - The Oppressed
4. "Stick Together" - Sub-Culture
5. "Liddle Towers" - Crux
6. "Horror Show" - The Warriors
7. "Big Brother" - Attak
8. "Revenge" - Black Flag
9. "Arthur's Theme" - Arthur and the Afters
10. "On Yer Bike" - Frankie and the Flames
11. "Getting Pissed" - The Magnificent Gonads
12. "Willie Whitelaws Willie" - Attila the Stockbroker
13. "The Belle of Snodland Town" - Judge Dread
14. "Oi Oi Music" - Skin Graft
15. "Away Day" - Attila the Stockbroker
16. "Such Fun" - Coming Blood

== See also ==
- Oi! The Album
- Carry On Oi!
- Strength Thru Oi!
- Son of Oi!
