= Son of Oi! =

Compilation album by Various artists
- Released: 1983
- Recorded: Various
- Genres: Oi!; punk; hardcore punk
- Label: Syndicate

Various artists chronology
Oi! Oi! That's Yer Lot! (1982)	Son of Oi! (1983)	The Oi! of Sex (1984)

Son of Oi! is a punk compilation album, released by Syndicate Records in 1983. It is 5th in the Oi! compilation series.

== Track listing ==
Side one - Arthur's Side

1. "Chip on my Shoulder" - Cock Sparrer
2. "Onwards" - Kraut
3. "Generation Landslide" - Prole!
4. "The Young Conservatives" - Garry Johnson
5. "Tomorrow's Whirl" - Paranoid Pictures
6. "Jobs Not Jails" - The Gonads
7. "Violent Playground" - Clockwork Destruction
8. "Joe Public" - Phil Sexton & Mick Turpin
9. "Herpes in Seattle" - Alaska Cowboys
10. "Lager Top Blues" - Gary & The Gonads
11. "Made in England" - Terry McCann
12. "6.27 to London" - Mick Turpin

Side two - Terry's Side

1. "Sing Something Swindle" - The Orgasm Guerillas
2. "Andy Is a Corporatist/Mindless Version" - Attila/Newtown Neurotics
3. "On the Streets" - 4-Skins
4. "Boy About Town" - Garry Johnson
5. "Out in the Cold" - The Business
6. "Make Mine Molotov" - Maniac Youth
7. "I Understand (Live)" - The Angelic Upstarts
8. "Manifestoi!" - Oi! The Robot
9. "Top of the Pops" - Phil Sexton
10. "This Is Your Life" - Vicious Rumours
11. "Jerusalem" - L.O.L.S. Choir
12. "Beano" - Oxo's Midnight Stumblers

== See also ==
- Oi! The Album
- Strength Thru Oi!
- Carry On Oi!
- Oi! Oi! That's Yer Lot!
