= Oi! The Album =

Compilation album by various artists
- Released: 27 October 1980
- Recorded: Various
- Genre: Oi!
- Length: 42:57
- Label: EMI; Captain Oi!; Cleopatra
- Producer: Various

Various artists chronology
Oi! The Album (1980)	Strength Thru Oi! (1981)

Oi! The Album is a 1980 Oi! compilation album, released in 1980 by EMI, then re-released by Captain Oi! and Cleopatra Records on CD in later years. It was conceived and compiled by then Sounds columnist Garry Bushell who had coined the phrase "Oi!" to denote what he called a new breed of working class punk rock with "terrace" or mob choruses. Of the bands labelled 'Oi!', Bushell had managed the Cockney Rejects and went on to manage the Blood.

The album became the first in a series, followed by Strength Thru Oi! (Oi 2, 1981), Carry On Oi! (Oi 3!, 1981), Oi! Oi! That's Yer Lot! (Oi/4, 1982), Son of Oi! (1983) and The Oi! of Sex (1984).

== Track listing ==
Side one

1. "Oi! Oi! Oi!" - Cockney Rejects
2. "Rob a Bank (Wanna)" - Peter and the Test Tube Babies
3. "Wonderful World" - 4 Skins
4. "Have a Cigar" - The Postmen
5. "Daily News" - The Exploited
6. "Generation of Scars" - Terrible Twins
7. "Guns for the Afghan Rebels" - Angelic Upstarts
8. "Sunday Stripper" - Cock Sparrer

Side two

1. "Last Night Another Soldier" - Angelic Upstarts
2. "Chaos" - 4 Skins
3. "Here We Go Again" - Cockney Rejects
4. "Isubleeeene" - Max Splodge & Desert Island Joe
5. "Beardsmen" - The Postmen
6. "Where Have All The Bootboys Gone" - Slaughter & The Dogs
7. "Bootboys" - Barney and The Rubbles
8. "Intensive Care" - Peter and the Test Tube Babies
9. "I Still Believe in Anarchy" - The Exploited

== See also ==
- Carry On Oi!
- Oi! Oi! That's Yer Lot!
- Strength Thru Oi!
- Son of Oi!
