= Punk pathetique =

Punk rock subgenre

- Stylistic origins: Punk rock; glam rock; pub rock; music hall; drinking songs; football chants; Oi!; novelty songs; bawdy humour; British comedy
- Cultural origins: Late 1970s, England

Regional scenes
- East End of London

Other topics
- Garry Bushell - Sounds magazine - working class

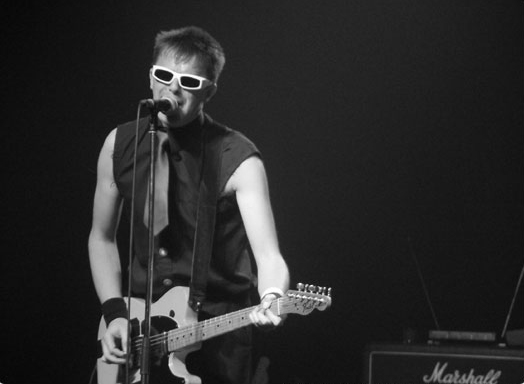
Michael "Olga" Algar of punk pathetique band Toy Dolls on stage in 2005

Punk pathetique is a subgenre of British punk rock (principally active circa 1980–1982) that involved humour and working-class cultural themes.

== Origin ==
The name of the genre was coined by Sounds journalist Garry Bushell, who actively championed many of its exponents. Punk pathetique was initially an attempt to characterize a group of London bands that embodied Cockney culture with a Dickensian, comedic, working class attitude. Musically, it was related to (and had crossover with) the Oi! subgenre. The cover of the 1980 Bushell/Sounds compilation album Oi! The Album described the record as featuring "ruck 'n' rollers and punk pathetiques". In contrast to harder-edged Oi! bands with more serious lyrics, punk pathetique bands focused on the naughty, silly and trivial. Max Splodge of Splodgenessabounds said: "The pathetique bands are the other side of Oi! We're working class too, only whereas some bands sing about prison and the dole, we sing about pilchards and bums. The audience is the same".

Some punk pathetique bands had notable success in the UK charts. Toy Dolls reached No. 4 in December 1984 with "Nellie the Elephant". Splodgenessabounds reached No. 7 in 1980 with "Simon Templar," and No. 26 with "Two Little Boys" later that year. According to Bushell:

During 1980, hooligan audiences, especially in South East London, found new live laughs in the shape of Peckham-based piss-artist pranksters Splodgenessabounds, whose brand of coarse comedy and punk energy scored three Top 30 singles that year. Their debut single, "Two Pints of Lager and a Packet of Crisps Please" was a Top 10 smash. Tongue in cheek, I dubbed them "punk pathetique" along with equally crazy bands like Brighton's Peter and the Test Tube Babies and Maccam jesters the Toy Dolls.

Peter and the Test Tube Babies were first featured in Sounds in July 1980, and made their vinyl debut on Oi! The Album later that year. They favoured absurd lyrics and strange titles, such as "The Queen Gives Good Blow Jobs" and "Elvis Is Dead (He Was 42 and a Fat Cunt)". Toy Dolls, based in Sunderland, shared the punk pathetique approach to nonsensical entertainment. Toy Dolls singer Michael "Olga" Algar told Sounds in March 1980: "We're a new wave group, but we're not serious. All our songs are pretty childish and infantile, but they're all based on things and people 'round here".

Bushell wrote that punk pathetique peaked in autumn 1980, with the "Pathetique Convention" staged at the Electric Ballroom. However, music critic Dave Thompson has said, regarding Splodgenessabounds' 1981 album:

Music historians find their attention drawn to "We're Pathetique", Splodge's rallying call for a musical genre which precious few people even remember today. But the punk pathetique movement spawned not only Splodge, but also such joys as the Toy Dolls and Peter and the Test Tube Babies, and it still has an impact today.

Other punk pathetique bands included Television Personalities, Half Man Half Biscuit, the Shapes, the Gonads, the Adicts, Notsensibles, Auntie Pus, the Postmen, Desert Island Joe, the Hoopers, Pierre the Poet (Garry Butterfield), Paul Devine, Lord Waistrel & the Cosh Boys, Stephen Louis Knoche Jr & His Raging Cronies, the Alaska Cowboys, Patronage, Percy Throwers Man Eating Plans, SexyCows, the Orgasm Guerrillas, the Implications, and Doughnut & the Donor. Later, the mantle was inherited by the Bus Station Loonies, Monkish and Macc Lads, who performed comic punk singalongs in very much the same style. Toy Dolls, Peter and the Test Tube Babies, the Gonads, Splodgenessabounds and Auntie Pus & The Men From Uncle continue to tour and record.

== Fun-Punk ==
In Germany, the similar Fun-Punk genre emerged in the mid-1980s as a response to hardcore punk, which at that time was marked by political correctness and negative imagery. Fun-punk often dealt with absurd themes or alcohol and drug excesses. An early pioneer was Normahl, later followed by Die Ärzte, Die Goldenen Zitronen, Die Kassierer, and Wizo. According to Ox-Fanzine, Die Goldenen Zitronen's music was distinguished from the "testosterone-fueled, often sexually discriminatory" music of bands like Dimple Minds.
