= Live and Loud!! =

Live and Loud!! and Live and Rockin' are series of live albums released by the British label Link Records. The label started releasing live albums by punk bands under the name Live and Loud!! in 1987 and released them through 1992. In 1989, the label started releasing live albums by rockabilly/psychobilly bands under the name Live and Rockin', and released them through 1990. Prior to 1989, the albums were exclusively released on vinyl. Many were released on CD later on, with some being released on vinyl and CD simultaneously.

== Releases ==
Band	Title	Catalog number	Release date
Sham 69	Live and Loud!!	LINK LP 04	1987
Cock Sparrer	Live and Loud!!	LINK LP 05	1987
The Meteors	Live and Loud!!	LINK LP 06	1987
Bad Manners	Live and Loud!!	LINK LP 07	1987
Cockney Rejects	Live and Loud!!	LINK LP 09	1987
The Adicts	Live and Loud!!	LINK LP 010	1987
The Ruts	Live and Loud!!	LINK LP 013	1987
The Exploited	Live and Loud!!	LINK LP 018	1987
Sham 69	Live and Loud!! Volume 2	LINK LP 025	1988
Stiff Little Fingers	Live and Loud!!	LINK LP 026	1988
Angelic Upstarts	Live and Loud!!	LINK LP 040	1988
Splodgenessabounds	Live and Loud!!	LINK LP 042	1988
Heavy Metal Kids	Live and Loud!!	LINK LP 047	1988
The Gonads	Live and Loud!!	LINK LP 049	1988
Vice Squad	Live and Loud!!	LINK LP 050	1988
Infa Riot	Live and Loud!!	LINK LP 052	1988
Sex Pistols	Live and Loud!!	LINK LP 063	1989
The Polecats	Live and Rockin'	LINK MLP 069	1989
Condemned 84	Live and Loud!! (The Bridgehouse Tapes)	LINK LP 070	1989
4 Skins	Live and Loud!!	LINK LP 090	1989
The Deltas	Link and Rockin'	LINK LP 096	1989
The Business	Live and Loud!!	LINK LP 097	1989
Frantic Flintstones	Live and Rockin'	LINK LP 098	1989
The Tailgators	Live and Rockin'	LINK MLP 101	1989
The Lurkers	Live and Loud!!	LINK LP 103	1989
King Kurt	Live and Rockin'	LINK LP 106	1989
999	Live and Loud!!	LINK LP 107	1989
Peter and the Test Tube Babies	Live and Loud!!	LINK LP 108	1989
Demented Are Go	Live and Rockin'	LINK LP 116	1990
The Coffin Nails	Live and Rockin'	LINK LP 118	1990
Anti-Nowhere League	Live and Loud!!	LINK LP 120	1990
The Batfinks	Live and Rockin'	LINK LP 122	1990
The Radiacs	Live and Rockin'	LINK LP 128	1990
The Adverts	Live and Loud!!	LINK LP 159	1992
