= Live and Loud =

Live and Loud may refer to:

- Live & Loud (Ozzy Osbourne album), a 1993 album by Ozzy Osbourne
- Live & Loud 2009, a 2009 album by Buckcherry
- Live and Loud (Sevendust album), 1998
- Live and Loud!!, a series of live albums from Link Records
  - Live and Loud!! (Sham 69 album)
  - Live and Loud (Stiff Little Fingers album)
  - Live and Loud (The Adicts album)
- Live and Loud (Nirvana video), recorded 1993, released 2013
