= Anti-establishment (disambiguation) =

Anti-establishment is ppposition to the conventional social, political, and economic principles of a society.

It may also refer to:

- Anti-Establishment Clause, about religious freedom
- Anti-Establishment (band), a British punk band
