= Captain Oi! Records =

English record label

- Genre: Punk; hardcore punk; Oi!
- Country of origin: England, United Kingdom
- Location: High Wycombe
- Official website: captainoi.com

Captain Oi! Records is a punk rock and Oi! record label based in High Wycombe, England. The company has released over 300 albums by many notable punk and Oi! bands of the late 1970s and 1980s. The label was set up by Mark Brennan, former bassist of The Business, who had previously co-run Link Records and the Dojo subsidiary of Castle Records. Brennan's inspiration had been Ace Records, with Captain Oi! targeted at being "the Ace Records of retro punk rock", reissuing material by classic punk bands.

The label's remit expanded with the release of newly recorded albums by bands that fitted in with the style of the label, such as Argy Bargy, and new material by some of the older punk bands including Special Duties and Cockney Rejects. Through its Captain Mod sub-imprint, the label has also reissued albums by Mod revival and 2 Tone artists originally released contemporaneously with the heyday of punk and Oi, including the Selecter, Secret Affair and The Chords.

== Partial list of bands on the label ==
- The 4-Skins
- 999
- Abrasive Wheels
- The Adicts
- The Adverts
- Angelic Upstarts
- Anti-Establishment
- Anti Nowhere League
- Anti-Pasti
- Alternative TV
- Bad Manners
- Blitz
- The Boys
- The Business
- Buzzcocks
- Chaos UK
- Chaotic Dischord
- Chelsea
- Chron Gen
- Cockney Rejects
- Cock Sparrer
- Conflict
- The Defects
- The Dickies
- Discharge
- The Drones
- Eddie and the Hot Rods
- English Dogs
- The Exploited
- Extreme Noise Terror
- GBH
- Goldblade
- Judge Dread
- Leyton Buzzards
- London
- The Lurkers
- Major Accident
- The Members
- The Meteors
- One Way System
- The Oppressed
- The Outcasts
- The Partisans
- Patrik Fitzgerald
- Penetration
- Peter and the Test Tube Babies
- Ramones
- The Rezillos
- The Ruts
- The Saints
- Secret Affair
- The Selecter
- Sham 69
- Sid Vicious
- Sex Pistols (Sid Vicious)
- The Skids
- Slaughter & the Dogs
- Splodgenessabounds
- Stiff Little Fingers
- Suburban Studs
- Tenpole Tudor
- Toy Dolls
- UK Subs
- The Vapors
- The Vibrators
- Vice Squad
- Wayne County & the Electric Chairs

== See also ==
- List of record labels
