= The Defects =

Punk rock band from Northern Ireland

- Origin: Belfast, Northern Ireland
- Genre: Punk rock
- Years active: 1978–1984, 2010–present
- Labels: WXYZ Records, Casualty Records, I.D. Records, Punkerama Records, Antisociety
- Members: Ian "Buck" Murdock; Glenn Kingsmore; Aidy "Fudge" Dunlop; Roy McAllister
- Past members: Marcus "Dukie" Duke; Jeff Gilmore; Gary Smith

The Defects are a punk rock band from Belfast, Northern Ireland, formed in 1978.

== History ==
The band formed in 1978 with a lineup of Ian "Buck" Murdock (vocals), Marcus "Dukie" Duke (guitar), Greg Fenton (bass) and Glenn Kingsmore (drums).(Fenton was soon replaced by Jeff Gilmore.)

After playing some gigs locally Gary Smith replaced Jeff Gilmore on bass and they recorded their first demo, at Downtown Studios, Newtownards, but when this failed to gain them a record deal, they started their own Casualty Records label and issued their debut 7", "Dance (Until You Drop)". The three-song EP sold all 2,000 copies and brought the band to the attention of the UK music press. Melody Maker journalist Carol Clerk who befriended the band and recommended them to John Curd, manager of WXYZ Records, who signed them to his label. The Defects moved to London in 1982 and embarked on the six-week "So What" UK tour with labelmates the Anti-Nowhere League, Chelsea and Chron Gen. The tour was filmed by Stewart Copeland (with backing from brother Miles) and intended for cinema release, but it was never issued.

A second single, "Survival", was issued in 1982, reaching No. 8 in the UK Indie Chart. The band released their debut album, Defective Breakdown, in 1982. Christopher Owens (writing for The Pensive Quill) describes the album as one "...that epitomises the sound of (what we now call) UK82 (or early 80's British punk)."

With Curd looking for ways to gain crossover success for the bands on his label, he persuaded the Defects to record a cover version of Elvis Presley's "Suspicious Minds" with producer Ray Shulman on keyboards. The single's release in early 1984 coincided with the decline in popularity of second-wave punk, and did not sell well. With control of the band's destiny slipping away, Murdock left after the release of "Suspicious Minds". The band continued, playing a gig supporting 999 with Kingsmore on vocals, before Murdock rejoined to play in support of the Clash in Belfast. The band then permanently split, with all members returning to Belfast except Duke, who stayed in London. Kingsmore joined Western Justice with former members of Rabies, including Murdock's brother Gary, and was later a member of Ashanti.

Murdock revived the Defects name in 1996 for a one-off performance at a punk festival at the Bath Pavilion, which was filmed and released on video by Barn End Video as Live at the Pavilion 12.10.96. He later started the punk and ska covers band Doghouse.

The Defects reformed again in 2010 and played various punk festivals. Added to the lineup were Roy McAllister and Aidy "Fudge" Dunlop (replacing Duke and Smith). In 2012, they toured Australia, followed by appearances at the Rebellion Punk Festival in Blackpool in 2013, 2014, 2016, 2017 and 2018. Since 2014, Duke occasionally joins them on stage for some of their best known songs.

== Discography ==
=== Studio albums ===
- Defective Breakdown (1982, WXYZ Records) UK Indie No. 10 (reissued 1994, Captain Oi!)
- Politicophobia (2013, Punkerama Records)
- 45 Minutes (2015, Punkerama Records)
- Feed the Good Dog (2017, Punkerama Records)
- The Death of Imagination (2020, Punkerama Records)
- Olio (2021, Casualty Records)
- Cave of the Fallen Angel (2025, Casualty Records)

=== Singles ===
- "Dance (Until You Drop)" (1981, Casualty Records)
- "Survival / Brutality" (1982, WXYZ Records) UK Indie No. 8
- "Suspicious Minds" (1984, I.D. Records) UK Indie No. 17
- "Revelator" (2011, Punkerama Records)
- "Riot Free Zone?" (2013, Punkerama Records)
- "Hill Street" (2013, Punkerama Records)

=== Live albums ===
- Live at the Ulster Hall March 2014 (2015, Punkerama Records)

=== Compilation albums ===
- 1979–1984 (2010, Punkerama Records/Antisociety)

=== Compilation appearances ===
- "Dance (Until You Drop)" on Punky Party E.P. flexi-disc (1982, Flexipop)

=== Videos ===
- Live at the Pavilion 12.10.96 (1996, Barn End Video)
- Made in Belfast (2015, Punkerama Records)
