= Insurgence Records =

Canadian independent record label

Insurgence Records is a Canadian-based independent record label founded in 2000. The street music label specializes in rock music subgenres associated with the skinhead subculture, including Oi!, street punk and hardcore. Insurgence Records releases recordings from established acts and up-and-comers.

The original compilation series that marked the formative years of the label, Class Pride World Wide sums up the label's pro-working class and anti-fascist stance, as well as the label's role of providing a platform for the progressive aspects of the skinhead subculture. A partial list of bands on the label include: Angelic Upstarts (England), Hold a Grudge (Canada) Bishops Green (Canada), The Bois (Singapore), The Oppressed (Wales), The Prowlers (Canada), Razors in the Night (United States) and Stage Bottles (Germany)

== Discography ==
Year	Number	Artist	Title	Ref.
2002	1	The Class Assassins	State of Emergency	
2002	2	Fate 2 Hate	Iron Fist	
2003	3	Fighting Chance	Thus Hope Fades	
2004	4	Fighting Chance	Sacrifice and Struggle	
2005	5	The Oppressed	Skinhead Times - 1982-1998	
2005	6	The Oppressed	Won't Say Sorry - The Complete Cover Story	
2005	7	Union Made	Hard Grace	
2006	8	Various artists	Class Pride World Wide 3	
2007	9	Death In Custody	Infected With Rage	
2009	10	The Blackout Brigade	Death and Dishonesty	
2010	11	The Class Assassins	You've Got It All Wrong	
2010	12	Redskins	Epilogue	
2011	13	Union Made	Alchemists	
2011	14	The Prowlers/Produzenten Der Froide	Montreal vs. Stuttgart	
2014	15	The Bois	High on Oi!	
2014	16	The Bois	The Pride of Lion City	
2013	17	The Bois/The Oppressed LCS	Till I Die...	
2020	18	Angelic Upstarts/The Prowlers	Split EP	
2015	19	The Opressed/The Prowlers	Skins'n'Punks Volume 6	
2017	20	The Prowlers	Serial Pousseur	
2014	21	The Prowlers	On the Run	
2007	22	The Press	The Complete Press - 1984-1994	
2014	23	The Bois	Sharp as a Razor	
2018	24	The Press	Our Own Path	
2018	25	Reckless Upstarts/Streetlight Saints	Split EP	
2018	26	Street Troopers/Bromure	Split EP	
2018	27	The Press/The Brass	Split EP	
2018	28	The Prowlers/Rude Pride	Split EP	
2020	29	The Bench/The Bois	Split EP	
2018	30	Various Artists	North3rn Aggression	
2019	31	Reckless Upstarts	Glory	
2020	32	The Elite	Reason For My Sin	
2020	33	Off the Clock	For You	
2020	34	Rough Cuts	Nobody's Fool	
2022	35	The Prowlers	Prowl Around	
2022	36	Reckless Upstarts	Still Standing: The Early Years	
2022	37	The Bois	Rise Again	
2022	38	No Heart	No Heart	
2023	39	Reckless Upstarts	We Walk Alone	
2024	40	The Uncouth	The Uncouth	
2024	41	Battery March	Winter In America	
2025	42	Street Code	In My Flight	

== Roster ==
- Angelic Upstarts
- Anger Flares
- Battery March
- The Bayonets
- The Bench
- The Blackout Brigade
- Boiler
- The Bois
- The Borderguards
- The Brass
- Bromure
- Cervelli Stanki
- The Class Assassins
- Curasbun
- Death In Custody
- Discipline
- Dusters
- The Elite
- Esclaves Salarjes
- Fate 2 Hate
- Fear City
- Fighting Chance
- Freiboiter
- La Gachette
- Hard Evidence
- Hard Skin
- Harrington Saints
- Honour Guard
- King Cans
- Loikaemie
- The Lower Orders
- Off the Clock
- No Heart
- Nuts & Bolts
- The Oppressed
- The Press
- Produzenten Der Froide
- The Prowlers
- Puntas de Acero
- Redskins
- Rough Cuts
- Rude Pride
- Runnin' Riot
- S-Contro
- Spit On Your Grave
- Street Code
- Streetlight Saints
- Street Terror
- Street Troopers
- The Uncouth
- Union Made
- United Front
