= Anti-Pasti =

British punk rock band

- Origin: Derby, England
- Genres: Punk rock
- Years active: 1978–1984, 1995, 2012–2022
- Labels: Dose, Rondelet, Anagram, Captain Oi!, Westworld
- Past members: Kev Nixon; Ollie Hoon; Ben Hanson; Martin Roper; Dugi Bell; Russell Maw; Edmund Sonuga-Barke aka Eddie Barke; Stan Smith; Stu Winfield; Will Hoon; Gez Addictive; Glynn Barber; Micky Bones

Anti-Pasti were a British punk rock band, founded by vocalist Martin Roper and guitarist Dugi Bell in 1978, and featuring Kev Nixon on drums and Will Hoon on bass guitar. Later they were joined by a second guitarist, Ollie Hoon. Their first album, The Last Call, spent seven weeks in the UK Albums Chart, peaking at No. 31. Roper left the band in 1982, and Anti-Pasti effectively ended until reformations in both 1995 and 2012.

== History ==
From Derby, England, Anti-Pasti were part of the second wave of punk of the early 1980s. The group were formed from a local outfit called the Scrincers, and comprised Dugi Bell on guitar, Martin Roper on lead vocals, Russell Maw and Eddie Barke (aka Edmund Sonuga-Barke). Barke and Maw soon quit. Maw went on to play for the Allies, Aftermath UK and the Egyptian Kings. Barke went on to become a notable cognitive neuroscientist. With the addition of Stu Winfield on bass and Stan Smith on drums, they released their debut EP, Four Sore Points, on their own Dose record label. They played many gigs in and around Derby, most notably The Cosmo Club and The Ajanta, and soon built up a large local following supporting bands such as The Clash and U.K. Subs.

Winfield and Smith were then replaced by Kev Nixon and Will Hoon before the group signed to Rondelet Records, which re-released the Four Sore Points EP before releasing "Let Them Free" in January 1981. Later that year, Anti-Pasti released their debut album, The Last Call, which reached the Top 40 in the UK Albums Chart. Their growing profile was confirmed when a third single, "Six Guns", appeared at the end of the year and reached number 1 in the UK Indie Chart, as did their joint venture with The Exploited, a 7" EP, Don't Let 'Em Grind You Down. It featured the tracks "Ain't Got Me" and "Another Dead Soldier"; both were recorded as part of the Wragby Studio Session Tapes in 1980. The latter spent one week at No. 70 in the UK Singles Chart in December 1981.

In 1981 also saw the band take part in the "Apocalypse Now" tour with fellow third-wave punk bands The Exploited, Discharge, Vice Squad, Chron Gen and The Anti Nowhere League. Winter 1981 saw Anti-Pasti tour America and Canada performing with Dead Kennedys, Naked Raygun and Flipper.

"East to the West", released in 1982, preceded the final Anti-Pasti album and single, both titled "Caution in the Wind", which featured Will Hoon's brother Ollie on guitar. A self-titled singles retrospective was issued a year later, but the group split in 1984 following the firing of Roper. There was a reunion in 1995, leading to mini-tours of the UK and (Germany).

After years working in the retail trade, Roper currently runs Real Ale Tours of Derby, and has various food related business interests. Bell has a financial interest in the Golddigga fashion chain.

== Reformation ==
The band reformed in 2012, with a line up of Martin Roper (vocals), Ollie Hoon (lead guitar), Kev Nixon (drums) and new member Ben Hanson (bass). The first concert back after a 17-year absence was a warm up gig at The Horn at St. Albans on 31 July 2012, they then performed three days later as special guests at the Rebellion Festival. The third gig they played was at the 1st Annual Punk Gig at London's 229, along with Ruts DC, Glen Matlock and the Philistines, Discharge (band), The Business (band), Vice Squad, and Infa-Riot amongst others.

During 2012, the band has also written and performed two new songs live "Viva Che" and "I See Red", which have been demoed along with re-workings of old songs "Last Train to Nowhere" and "Burn in Your Own Flames". A press statement said that the band would soon be releasing a four track EP; however, in January 2014 it was announced that Roper had decided to leave the band to pursue interests outside the music business. As of February 2014, Anti Pasti announced a new vocalist, Gez Addictive, and their intention to be playing material old and new at some of the pre Spannered Festival shows.

This line-up played various festivals around the UK and Europe, including Rebellion and Pod Parou; as well as mini tours on the continent, most notably Germany.

The band continued to write new material and finally, 34 years since their last studio album was released, laid down tracks for an upcoming album. The album was to be released in August 2016 and the band were asked to feature on the 20th anniversary of Rebellion Festival alongside other UK82 contemporary's such as The Exploited, Discharge, Chron Gen, Vice Squad and the Anti Nowhere League, however with the album set for release and shows arranged to promote it Gez Addictive was fired from the band. The Rebellion show was cancelled as were other festival and UK dates.

In August, the album Rise Up was finally released, and original member and lead singer Martin Roper agreed to fulfil gigs arranged in Antwerp and Paris; this however (because of Roper's work commitments) was agreed as a temporary measure. In the summer of 2017 vocal duties were assumed by Chron Gens, Glynn Barber, who split duties between the two bands. Following Barber's departure from the line-up Micky Bones, briefly became the front man before the band decided to become a trio with bassist Ben Hanson becoming permanent lead vocalist.

== Discography ==
=== Singles ===
- Four Sore Points EP (1980 Dose Records – Dose 001)
- Four Sore Points EP (1981 Re-release- Rondelet Records – Round 2)
- "Let Them Free" (1981 Rondelet Records – Round 5)
- "Six Guns" (1981 Rondelet Records – Round 10)
- Don't Let Them Grind You Down EP (1981 split release with The Exploited) (The Exploited Record Co – Exp 1003) – UK No. 70
- "East to the West" (1982 Rondelet Records – Round 18)
- "Caution in the Wind" (1982 Rondelet Records – Round 26)

=== Studio albums ===
- The Last Call (1981 Rondelet Records – About 5) – UK No. 31
- Caution in the Wind (1982 Rondelet Records – About 7)
- Rise Up (2016 Westworld Recordings)

=== Compilation albums ===
- Anti-Pasti – (1983 Rondelet Records – Round 13)
- The Best of Anti-Pasti (1996 – Dojo CD – 230)
- The Punk Singles Collection (2005 – Anagram)

== Bibliography ==
- Burning Britain: The History of UK Punk 1980–1984 by Ian Glasper – ISBN 1901447243
