= Bad Boy (The Adicts song) =

Single by The Adicts
- Released: May 1983
- Recorded: 1983
- Genre: Punk
- Label: Razor Records
- Songwriter(s): Keith Warren, Pete Davison, Michael Davison, Mel Ellis,

The Adicts singles chronology
"Chinese Takeaway" (1982)	"Bad Boy" (1983)	"Tokyo" (1984)

Picture disc

"Bad Boy" is a song by punk band the Adicts, released as a single by Razor Records in May 1983. It was released as a standard black vinyl 7-inch single and also as a 7-inch picture disc with one additional track. The single was the band's biggest hit, reaching No. 75 on the UK Singles Chart and No. 4 on the UK Independent Chart. This brought major label interest to the band, which led to their next single being released by the Warner imprint Sire Records. "Bad Boy" was included on the band's next studio album, Smart Alex, while both B-sides originally appeared on Sound of Music.

== Track listing ==
1. "Bad Boy"
2. "Shake Rattle Bang Your Head"
3. "Joker in the Pack" (picture disc only)

== Personnel ==
=== The Adicts ===
- Keith "Monkey" Warren - Vocals
- Pete "Pete Dee" Davison - Guitar
- Mel "Spider" Ellis - Bass
- Michael "Kid Dee" Davison - Drums
