= Normahl =

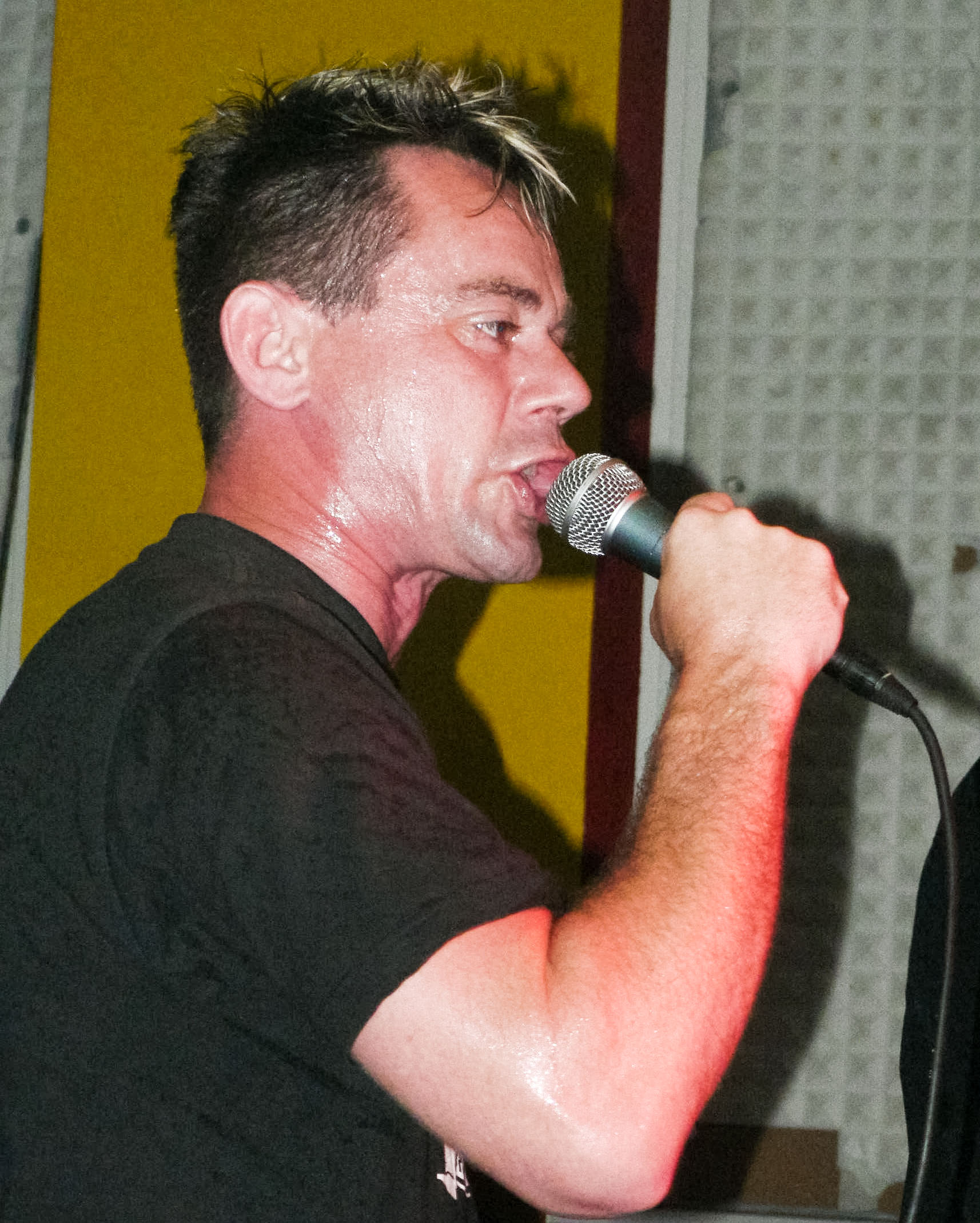
- The singer for Normahl, Lars Besa, in 2006

Background information
- Origin: Stuttgart, Germany
- Genres: Punk rock
- Years active: 1978–1996, 2002-present
- Members: Lars Besa - vocals Mick Scheuerle - guitar Manny Rutzen - bass, vocals Raimund 'Scobo' Skobowky - drums
- Past members: Jürgen 'Pipi' Pirpamer - guitar Rüdiger Stamer - drums Jogi Venxion - drums Helmut Krizsan - drums
- Website: www.normahl.de

Normahl (written: NoRMAhl, meaning "normal" in German) is a German punk band formed in 1978 in Winnenden near Stuttgart by five high school students. Their music is upbeat and typically classified as punk pathetique ('pret-punk', or 'Fun-Punk') as well as Deutschpunk. Their lyrics sometimes deals with themes like sex, drugs, and partying. However Normahl's songs also notably address left-political themes such as police violence, xenophobia, nationalism, anarchy, capitalism, and resistance to fascism, often in a humorous way.

Normahl had a large influence on the German punk rock scene in the 80s and 90s. Normahl released songs such as "Kein Bier vor vier" (English translation: "No beer before 4"), "Harte Nächte" (English translation: "Hard Nights"),"Biervampir" (English translation: "Beer Vampire"), und "Blumen im Müll" (English translation: "Flowers in the trash") – as well as songs like "Drecksau" (English translation: "Filthy pig"), and ballads like "Geh wie ein Tiger," (English translation: "Walk like a tiger") that still enjoy cult-status today.

== History ==
Normahl's first live performance was at their Gymnasium (high-school or secondary school) shortly after the band formed. In 1981 they released their first EP Stuttgart über alles on Mülleimer Records. The cover of this EP was a tribute to the Dead Kennedys'-single California über alles. In the same year the released their first album Verarschung total.

In 1992, Normal initiated the national program "Kein Hass im Wilden Süden" (English translation: "No hate in the wild South"), which combatted xenophobia and violence. This was a program in cooperation with their manager Hans Derer and the lifestyle magazine Prinz and the radio station SDR (renamed Südwestrundfunk, SWR).

Their song "Niemals vergessen," (English translation: "Never Forget") was a response to the radical right riots in Hoyerswerda in 1991; two versions were written, one in German and one multi-lingual version called "Let's Come Together." More than 150 artists made guest appearances on this track, including Hartmut Engler from the band Pur, Matt Sinner, Jasmin Tabatabai, Markus, and Chorlight. Normahl and Die Fantastischen Vier played a concert in the Marktplatz in Stuttgart in front of approximately 40,000 students; this was the largest demonstration to take place in Stuttgart up to that time. Normahl singer Lars Besa was granted the "Stern der Woche" from the magazine Stern; he appeared on television on the NDR Talkshow.

In 1993, Normahl released the album "Auszeit," which had the single "Sex am Telefon," (English translation: "Sex on the Telephone"). This single was actually later used for a commercial for telephones. This album contained a cover version of the song "Diplomatenjagd" written by Reinhard Mey. Because of this the band was invited to perform on the ZDF-Show with Mey and Sissi Perlinger. Although this album was well received and supported by a tour, it was not successful in the charts. The group broke up in 1996, after releasing two live cds "Ernst ist das Leben" and "Heiter ist die Kunst." Following the break-up singer Lars Besa began a solo-project called "L.A.R.S.". During this period, Normahl was included on many of the well-known series of compilation cds "Schlachtrufe BRD", including the famous first volume.

In 2002, Normahl reformed and released a new album "INRI 21" and toured to support this release. In 2003 they released their 25th anniversary best-of album "Das ist Punk"; for this album all of the songs were re-recorded. In 2005, Normahl released the album "Voll Assi." In 2008, the members of Normahl began to work on the script for a documentary film. The filming began in 2009, but this was interrupted by the Winnenden school shooting. The film presents the history of the band as well as the history of punk music in Germany. In 2011 the band contributed a song to the benefit cd "bunt statt braun" released by the Winnender Stiftung gegen Gewalt an Schulen (English translation: "Foundation against violence in the schools").

The Stuttgart record label "Zounds," recognized Normahl's contribution to German punk rock with a retrospective album in their "Best" series, entitled "Punk ist keine Religion."

On January 31, 2013 the public prosecutors for the city of Dresden were given a search order for the band members houses by the Stuttgart regional court. They were allowed to confiscate recordings of the song "Bullenschweine" from the album "Ein Volk steht hinter uns" (1982), which was classified as inciting violence, largely due to the lyrics "Haut die Bullen platt, wie Stullen" (English translation: "Knock the cops flat as a sandwich". As a reaction, some fans began a sale of the title, with the goal to get the song "Bullenschweine" in the charts. The song made the best-seller list on both Amazon and the iTunes Store, but did not reach the official charts. The album Ein Volk steht hinter uns was listed as dangerous for youth (German term: jugendgefährdenden Medien). However on December 11, 2015 it was taken off of that list.

In 2015 the album "Friede den Hütten Krieg den Palästen" was released on the new label D7, founded by Normales former manager Hans Derer. On this album, the song "Söldner" which was nominated for the Top 20. In February 2016, the albums "Verarschung Total" and "Lebendig I – Live in Switzerland" were confirmed on this list.

In 2018 the band celebrated their 40 year anniversary with a tv special on SWR. In 2021 Normahl was awarded silver IMPALA awards for four of their albums: "Blumen im Müll", "Auszeit", "Lebendig II" and "Lebendig III". In 2022, Normahl's single "Waldfest", a homage to the band Zupfgeigenhansel, topped the Amazon charts.

== Discography ==
=== Albums ===
- 1980 Stuttgart über alles (EP) (Stuttgart over all)
- 1981 Verarschung Total (LP)
- 1984 Ein Volk steht hinter uns (LP) (The people are behind us)
- 1984 Der Adler ist gelandet (LP) (The eagle has landed)
- 1985 Harte Nächte (LP) (Hard nights)
- 1986 Lebendig I - Live in Switzerland (LP/live) (Alive I - Live in Switzerland)
- 1988 Biervampir (Maxi-Single) (beer vampire)
- 1989 Kein Bier vor vier (LP) (No beer before four)
- 1991 Blumen im Müll (CD/LP) (Flowers in the garbage)
- 1993 Auszeit (CD/LP) (Time out)
- 1994 Lebendig II - Ernst ist das Leben (CD/live) (Alive II - Life is serious)
- 1994 Lebendig III - Heiter ist die Kunst (CD/ live) (Alive II - Art is funny)
- 2002 IN RI 21 (CD)
- 2003 Das ist Punk – Best of...(CD) (This is Punk - best of)
- 2005 Voll Assi (CD) (Totally associal)
- 2010 "Jong'r" (CD/DVD)
- 2011: Normahl Best: Punk ist keine Religion (CD)
- 2015: Friede den Hütten, Krieg den Palästen (CD und LP)
- 2018: Live In Bayerland

=== Singles ===
- 1987 "Harte Nächte" (Single) (Hard Night)
- 1987 "Fraggles" (Single)
- 1989 "Hans im Glück" (Single) (Lucky Hans)
- 1990 "Merry Jingle" (Single)
- 1991 "Geh wie ein Tiger" (Single/ Maxi CD) (Walk like a tiger)
- 1992 "Drecksau" (Maxi CD) (Dirty pig)
- 1992 "Diplomatenjagd" (Maxi CD) (Hunt the diplomat)
- 1993 "Weit weg" (Maxi CD) (Far away)
- 2000 "Sex am Telefon" (Maxi CD) (Sex on the telephone)
- 2005 "Sonne im Dezember" (Maxi CD)
- 2006 "Wenn ein Tor fällt..."(Maxi CD) (When a goal is shot...)
- 2011: Nach all den Jahren
- 2016: Kapitalistenlied
- 2017: Freiheit
- 2022: Das Narrenschiff-Single Edit
- 2022: Waldfest
