= Viva la Revolution (song) =

Single by The Adicts
- Released: 1982
- Genre: Punk rock
- Label: Fall Out Records
- Songwriter(s): Keith Warren, Pete Davison, Michael Davison, Mel Ellis,
- Producer(s): The Adicts

The Adicts singles chronology
"Viva la Revolution" (1982)	"Chinese Takeaway" (1982)

"Viva la Revolution" is a song by punk band the Adicts. It was re-recorded for their debut album Songs of Praise. It is one of the best-known songs by the band, and was featured in the 2003 video game Tony Hawk's Underground.

== Track listing ==
=== Side One ===
1. "Viva la Revolution"

=== Side Two ===
1. "Steamroller (My Baby Got Run Over By A)"
2. "Numbers"

== Personnel ==
=== The Adicts ===
- Keith "Monkey" Warren – Vocals
- Pete "Pete Dee" Davison – Guitar
- Mel "Spider" Ellis – Bass
- Michael "Kid Dee" Davison – Drums
