= Strength Thru Oi! =

Compilation album by various artists
- Released: May 1981
- Recorded: Various
- Genre: Oi!
- Label: Decca
- Producer: Gary Bushell

Various artists chronology
Oi! The Album (1980)	Strength Thru Oi! (1981)	Carry On Oi! (1981)

Strength Thru Oi! is a 1981 Oi! compilation album, featuring various artists and released by Decca Records, released in collaboration with Sounds magazine. It peaked at No. 51 on the UK Albums Chart.

The album was the sequel to Oi! The Album (1980), and itself was followed by Carry On Oi! (Oi 3!, 1981) and Oi! Oi! That's Yer Lot! (Oi/4, 1982).

== Background and controversy ==
When Strength Thru Oi! was released, it was controversial because its title was alleged to be a play on a Nazi slogan ("Strength Through Joy"), and the cover featured Nicky Crane, a British Movement activist and neo-Nazi who was serving a four-year sentence for racist violence. Rock critic Garry Bushell, who was responsible for compiling the album, said its title was a pun on The Skids' EP Strength Through Joy and that, as an active anti-fascist in the 1970s, he had been unaware of the Nazi connotations. He also denied knowing the identity of the skinhead on the album's cover until it was exposed by the Daily Mail two months later. The intended cover model was bodybuilder Carlton Leach but the pictures, taken at the Bridge House pub in Canning Town, East London, weren't good enough. A cover drawn up by the record label showing a young skinhead from above with the title on his head was rejected. The Crane image was taken from a Christmas card pinned to a wall in the Sounds office.

Bushell later said: "I had a Christmas card on the wall, it had that image that was on the cover of Strength Thru Oi!, but washed out. I honestly, hand on my heart, thought it was a still from The Wanderers. It was only when the album came through for me to approve the artwork that I saw his tattoos. Of course, if I hadn't been impatient, I would have said, right, fucking scrap this, let's shoot something else entirely. Instead, we airbrushed the tattoos out. There were two mistakes there, both mine. Hands up." The album was "hastily withdrawn" by Decca Records when Crane's identity and previous convictions were made public, and has since become very collectable.

The sleeve notes of the album were interpreted by some critics as glorifying violence: "A mass of boots, straights, and combat jackets, skins and boot boys, grins and hoots and oy-oy's, young blood on the prowl.... Getting nicked for wearing steel caps, a flick blade flashing in the moonlight." Others argued that this was simply a reflection of the reality of British working class life.

== Track listing ==
1. "National Service" - Garry Johnson
2. "1984" - 4 Skins
3. "Gang Warfare" - The Strike
4. "Riot Riot" - Infa-Riot
5. "Dead End Yobs" - Garry Johnson
6. "Working Class Kids" - The Last Resort
7. "Blood on the Streets" - Criminal Class
8. "She Goes to Fino's" - The Toy Dolls
9. "Best Years of Our Lives" - Barney Rubble
10. "Taken for a Ride" - Cock Sparrer
11. "We Outnumber You" - Infa-Riot
12. "The New Face of Rock'n'Roll" - Garry Johnson
13. "Beans" - Barney Rubble
14. "We're Pathetique" - Splodge
15. "Sorry" - 4 Skins
16. "Running Riot" - Cock Sparrer
17. "Johnny Barden" - The Last Resort
18. "Isubaleene (Part 2)" - Splodge
19. "Running Away" - Criminal Class
20. "Skinhead" - The Strike
21. "Deidre's a Slag" - The Toy Dolls
22. "Harbour Mafia Mantra" - The Shaven Heads

== See also ==
- Oi! The Album
- Carry On Oi!
- Oi! Oi! That's Yer Lot!
