= Sound of Music (album) =

Studio album by The Adicts
- Released: 22 November 1982
- Genre: Punk rock
- Label: Razor
- Producer: Harry T. Murlowski and Steve Tannet

The Adicts chronology
Songs of Praise (1981)	Sound of Music (1982)	This Is Your Life (1984)

Professional ratings
Review scores
Source	Rating
AllMusic	3/5 stars
The Encyclopedia of Popular Music	3/5 stars
Punknews.org	3/5 stars

Sound of Music is the second studio album by punk band the Adicts, released in November 1982 by Razor Records. It was re-released by Captain Oi! Records in 2002 and by SOS Records in 2006, each with different bonus tracks. In 2002, Taang! Records reissued the album, along with Smart Alex and bonus tracks, as The Collection. The same Sound of Music disc, with bonus tracks, was released separately in 2004.

== Track listing ==
All songs written by Keith Warren and Pete Davison, except as noted.

1. "How Sad"
2. "4-3-2-1"
3. "Chinese Takeaway"
4. "Johnny Was a Soldier"
5. "Disco"
6. "Eyes in the Back of Your Head"
7. "Joker in the Pack"
8. "Lullaby"
9. "My Baby Got Run Over by a Steamroller"
10. "A Man's Gotta Do"
11. "Let's Go"
12. "Easy Way Out"
13. "Shake Rattle, Bang Your Head"

2002 Captain Oi! CD Bonus Tracks

14. "You'll Never Walk Alone" (Rodgers and Hammerstein)
15. "Too Young"
16. "I Wanna Be Sedated" (Ramones)

2002 Taang! CD bonus tracks

14. "You'll Never Walk Alone" (Rodgers & Hammerstein)
15. "Too Young"
16. "The Odd Couple"
17. "Who Spilt My Beer?"
18. "Come Along"
19. "I Wanna Be Sedated" (Ramones)
20. "It's a Laugh"
21. "Zimbabwe Brothers Are Go"

2006 SOS CD Bonus Tracks

14. "You'll Never Walk Alone" (Rodgers & Hammerstein)
15. "Too Young"
16. "Zimbabwe Brothers Are Go"
17. "Steamroller"

== Personnel ==
=== The Adicts ===
- Keith "Monkey" Warren - vocals
- Pete "Pete Dee" Davison - guitar
- Mel "Spider" Ellis - bass
- Michael "Kid Dee" Davison - drums

== Release history ==
Region	Date	Label	Format	Catalog	Notes
UK	1982	Razor Records	LP	RAZ 2	
US	1993	Cleopatra Records	CD	CLEO 3315-2	
UK	1998	Captain Oi! Records	CD	AHOY CD 088	Release with Smart Alex on one CD
UK	2002	Captain Oi! Records	CD	AHOY CD 195	Features three bonus tracks
US	2002	Taang! Records	CD	TAANG! 139	The Collection, features Sound of Music and Smart Alex with bonus tracks
US	2004	Taang! Records	CD	TAANG! 171	Features seven bonus tracks
US	2006	SOS Records	CD	SOSR 6048	Features four bonus tracks
US	2008	Taang! Records	LP	TAANG! 171	
