= The Discocks =

Japanese punk rock band

- Origin: Tokyo, Japan
- Genres: Punk rock, Oi!
- Years active: 1989-1998, 2003-present
- Members: Peter
- Past members: Naka-Chin; Y.A.S. Hiroshi; Hiroichi; Kyo; Mishiyan; Ben; Koudai; Mishima
- Website: www.myspace.com/thediscocksjapanpunk

The Discocks are a punk rock band formed in 1989 with Peter (Ohashi) and bass, Naka-chin on guitar and early D.S.B. drummer Hiroichi on drums.

== History ==
In 1994 the band released their first EP "Voice Of Youth" on their own New Age Records. The EP was re-released with a different cover on Helen Of Oi! Records. The band continued to play shows in Japan before in 1995 releasing The "Class Of '94" EP on Knock Out Records. This EP contained two covers of English Oi!/Punk band The Ejected. They also released the split EP with Tom And Boot Boys on Knock Out Records which contained three songs from Tom And Boot Boys and two from the Discocks (one of which was a cover of Menace's "Last Year's Youth"). New Age Records also released a compilation LP in 1995 called "Noise For The Boys" with the bands Raise A Flag, Taisho as well as five new songs from The Discocks. In 1997 the band went to North America with Tom And Boot Boys to record their first full length Long Live Oi! During their time they toured the east coast with The Unseen, The Casualties and Blanks 77. The Unseen members Mark and Paul also contributed to the choruses on Long Live Oi!. After returning to Japan in late 1997 the band recorded a two track EP on Overthrow Records called Bootboys Anthem. Soon saw the departure of longtime members Naka-Chin and Hiroishi, however they were quickly replaced with YAS and Ben from fellow Oi! band Blockbuster this lineup recorded the O.P.D.L. demo and appeared on the 7" compilation "Transition Period" alongside The Dick Spikie and Youth Anthem.

In 1998 the band broke up and members Peter and Hiroichi went on to play in The Avoided, a band with a more ska oriented sound. After five years, Discocks returned in 2003 with a new line-up and a new, more aggressive sound and with "The" dropped from their name. They recorded a three track reunion demo called "BSS Punk Sessions" with Mishima on drums and soon to be Extinct Government guitarist Hiroshi on Guitar. In 2005 the band released their first full length in almost ten years called "Don't be Fooled..." on Nori (Tom And Boot Boys) own label Pogo77. After a Korean tour and various gigs around Tokyo the band recorded five new songs for a split release with Swedish punks "The Negatives" (The Bristles). The CD was released on MCR Company. Besides playing in the Discocks, Peter now also plays in the reggae outfit 45RPM, while Naka-Chin also currently plays in a 1980s punk tribute called "Punk & Disorderly" with Nori (Tom and Boot Boys), Kentaro (ERECTiONS) and Hidenori (Hat Trickers).

== Band members ==
=== Current members ===
- Peter: Vocals, Bass

=== Past members ===
- Naka-Chin: Guitar
- Y.A.S.: Guitar
- Hiroshi: Guitar
- Hiroichi: Drums
- Kyo: Drums
- Mishiyan: Drums
- Ben: Drums
- Koudai: Drums
- Mishima: Drums

== Discography ==
- Voice Of Youth 7" (1994,(New Age Records)
- Voice Of Youth 7" (1994, Helen Of Oi! Records)
- Class Of '94 7" (1995, Knock Out Records)
- Hated & Proud Split 7" w/Tom And Boot Boys (1995, Knock Out Records)
- Long Live Oi! 12"/CD (1997, Knock Out/Cargo Records)
- Bootboys Anthem 7" (1997, Overthrow Records)
- O.P.D.L. Tape (1998, self released)
- BSS Punk Sessions CD-R (2003, New Age Records)
- Don't Be Fooled, Don't Be Satisfied, Don't Be Ruled, Don't Be Denied (2005, Pogo 77 Records)
- Split w/The Negatives (MCR Company)
