= Nicky Crane =

British neo-Nazi activist and pornographic actor

- Born: Nicola Vincenzo Crane; 21 May 1958; Bexley, Kent, England
- Died: 7 December 1993 (aged 35); Paddington, London, England
- Known for: Member of British far-right movements

Nicola Vincenzo "Nicky" Crane (21 May 1958 – 7 December 1993) was an English neo-Nazi. He came out as gay before dying from an AIDS-related illness in 1993.

== Neo-Nazism ==
Nicky Crane joined the British Movement (BM) in the late 1970s. By 1980, he was the BM organiser for Kent. In 1978, he attacked a black family at a bus stop near Liverpool Street station. For this act, he was convicted of unlawfully fighting and making an affray, and given a suspended sentence. In the 1980s, Crane appeared on several T-shirts and calendars produced by the Aldgate skinhead shop The Last Resort. In 1981, he appeared on the cover of the Oi! compilation album Strength Thru Oi!, due to his skinhead appearance, not his racist views, with his Nazi tattoos partially airbrushed out.

Garry Bushell, who chose the image, later said: "I had a Christmas card on the wall, it had that image that was on the cover of Strength Thru Oi!, but washed out. I honestly, hand on my heart, thought it was a still from The Wanderers. It was only when the album came through for me to approve the artwork that I saw his tattoos. Of course, if I hadn't been impatient, I would have said, right, fucking scrap this, let's shoot something else entirely. Instead, we airbrushed the tattoos out. There were two mistakes there, both mine. Hands up." The album was "hastily withdrawn" by Decca Records when Crane's identity and previous convictions were made public, and has since become very collectable.

In 1981, Crane was convicted and jailed for four years for his role in a BM-organised attack on a group of black youths arriving on a train at Woolwich Arsenal station in 1980. He once led an attack on an anti-racist concert being held in Jubilee Gardens in London. Pictures of him storming the stage where singer Hank Wangford was performing appeared in national newspapers. Although Crane was clearly identifiable, no action was taken.

Released from jail in 1984, Crane soon began providing security for the white power skinhead band Skrewdriver, and remained associated with the band and its leader, Ian Stuart Donaldson, for the rest of the 1980s, designing two of the band's album covers and writing the lyrics for the song "Justice" on the LP Hail the New Dawn. In 1986, he was jailed again for six months following a fight on an Underground train. In 1987, he was instrumental in setting up the neo-Nazi network Blood & Honour with Donaldson.

== Homosexuality ==
Crane was leading a double life as a homosexual man, even serving as a steward at the London gay pride march in 1986. He was a regular at London gay clubs such as Heaven, Bolts and the Bell pub. At various times, Crane had worked as a binman, bicycle courier, and a doorman at an S&M club. He worked for the protection agency Gentle Touch, and was able to shrug off any connection with the London gay scene as just part of his security work. He also appeared in the Psychic TV music video for Unclean, and in amateur gay pornography films while still a neo-Nazi.

In 1992, Crane came out as gay in a segment of the Channel 4 magazine show Out titled "Skin Complex". On the programme, broadcast on 29 July 1992, Crane and several other gay people explained why they were attracted to the skinhead scene. He was immediately disowned by his Nazi associates, including Ian Stuart Donaldson, who said: "I feel more betrayed by him than anybody else. It just goes to show that nationalism and homosexuality do not fit together, because nationalism is a true cause and homosexuality is a perversion."

The same month, the UK newspaper The Sun ran an article on him entitled "Nazi Nick is a Panzi", and included a picture of Crane with his face snarling at camera, head shaved bald, braces worn over his bare torso, faded jeans, white-laced boots and brandishing an axe. Crane died from an AIDS-related illness 18 months later.

== In works ==
Crane's homosexuality is a central theme of Max Schaefer's 2010 novel, Children of the Sun, which follows James, a budding screenwriter in 2003, who becomes obsessed with the now deceased Crane.

== See also ==
- Michael Kühnen
