= Songs of Praise (The Adicts album) =

Studio album by The Adicts
- Released: 1981
- Genre: Punk rock
- Label: Dwed Wecords

The Adicts chronology
Lunch with The Adicts (1979)	Songs of Praise (1981)	Sound of Music (1982)

Alternative cover
- The cover of the original Dwed Wecords release

Professional ratings
Review scores
Source	Rating
The Encyclopedia of Popular Music	3/5 stars

Songs of Praise is the debut studio album by punk band the Adicts. It was released in 1981 on Dwed Wecords. It was re-released by Fall Out Records. A 1993 CD reissue by Cleopatra Records included two bonus tracks from the Bar Room Bop EP. In 2008, the album was rerecorded by the band and released as the "25th Anniversary Edition."

== Critical reception ==
The Encyclopedia of Popular Music called the album "something of a cult classic in punk record-collecting circles."

== Track listing ==
All songs written by Keith Warren and Pete Davison.

1. "England"
2. "Hurt"
3. "Just Like Me"
4. "Tango"
5. "Telepathic People"
6. "Mary Whitehouse"
7. "Distortion"
8. "Get Adicted"
9. "Viva la Revolution"
10. "Calling Calling"
11. "In the Background"
12. "Dynasty"
13. "Peculiar Music"
14. "Numbers"
15. "Sensitive"
16. "Songs of Praise"

=== 1993 Cleopatra bonus tracks ===
17. "Sound of Music"
18. "Who Spilt My Beer?"

== Personnel ==
=== The Adicts ===
- Monkey - vocals
- Pete Dee - guitar
- Mel Ellis - bass
- Kid Dee - drums

== Release history ==
Region	Date	Label	Format	Catalog	Notes
UK	1981	Dwed Wecords	LP	SMT-008	
UK	1981	Fall Out Records	LP	FALL LP 006	
UK	1993	Fall Out Records	CD	FALL CD 006	
US	1993	Cleopatra Records	CD	CLEO 2481-2	With two bonus tracks
Europe	2008	People Like You Records	CD/LP	Prison 161	
Europe	2008	People Like You Records	CD/LP	Prison 162	25th Anniversary Edition (re-recorded)
Europe	2008	People Like You Records	CD	Prison 163	Ultimate Edition, with original and 25th Anniversary Edition versions of the album and a DVD
