= Close Shave =

Australian a cappella quartet

Close Shave is one of Australia's longest serving male a cappella quartets. Based in Hobart, the quartet delights audiences at conferences, dinners, weddings, and other public functions with its diverse repertoire. In addition to the traditional Barbershop music style, the quartet is known to mix in popular music, jazz, Gospel, sea shanties, swing, and even some comedy.

== History ==
The quartet was formed in late 1983 by charter members Ben Oxley, Paul Oxley, Brian Sykes and Tim Begbie. Begdie's wife, Esther, is credited with coming up with the name Close Shave.

A member of AAMBS, Close Shave has participated in seven conventions since the inaugural convention on the Gold Coast in 1991. In 1993, the quartet took bronze in Perth and then added a second bronze in 1995 in Canberra. 1997 saw an inspired Close Shave win the silver medal in Sydney. The lineup pictured at right competed under the name "incognito" in the 2005 AAMBS Convention on the Gold Coast placing fifth.

In 1993, Close Shave planned to travel to the Perth Convention. This prompted baritone Tim Begbie to found Hobart's only male barbershop chorus: The Wellingtones.

== Lineup ==
Current

- Simon Beswick – tenor
- Jeames Bone – lead
- Dominic Mackie – bass
- Tim Begbie – baritone

History

- Tenor
  - Ben Oxley (1983–1985)
  - Tony Hitske (1986–1991)
  - Brian Yates (1991–1992)
  - Phil Elphinstone (1992–1994)
  - Daniel Beckitt (1994–1998)
  - Jason Geeves (1998–2008)
  - Simon Beswick (2002–present)
- Lead
  - Paul Oxley (1983–1985)
  - Ben Oxley (1985–1986)
  - Ken Hunt (1987)
  - Trevor Kean (1987)
  - John Newell (1987–1996) – International Gold Medal Quartet: Realtime
  - Craig Wood (1996–1998)
  - Geoff Green (1999–2001)
  - Adam Purton (2001–2007)
  - Chris Waterhouse (2007)
  - Kristian Byrne (2008–2009)
  - Tim Carolan (2010–2011)
  - Jeames Bone (2012–present)
- Bass
  - Brian Sykes (1983–1993)
  - John Ballard (1993–2004)
  - Jimmy Hoggett (2004–2007)
  - Jeff Michel (2007–2010)
  - Andrew Carolan (2010–2012)
  - Dominic Mackie (2012–present)
- Baritone
  - Tim Begbie (1983–present)
