= Anti-Establishment (band) =

Former English band

- Origin: UK
- Genres: Punk rock, hardcore punk, Oi!
- Years active: 1978-1983, 2013
- Label: Captain Oi! Records
- Members: Gavin Gritton; Nick Freeston; Kevin 'Gluey' Read
- Past members: Haggis; Matt Johnson; Colin Little; Gary Dawson

Anti-Establishment was an English punk band, formed in 1978. They went through a number of line ups before settling on one that would record the majority of their material: Gavin Gritton on vocals, Nick Freeston on drums, Haggis on lead guitar, and Kevin Read on bass. The first gig was in 1979. The band initially only went on to play around 25 shows but, as it says in the liner notes to the compilation of all of their work compiled by Captain Oi! Records in 1997, 'the name Anti-Establishment is still held in high esteem amongst the Oi!/Punk Fraternity'.

The first single was "1980's" / "Mechanical Man", produced by The Damned drummer Rat Scabies and released in March 1980 under the Charnel House label.

The second single was "Future Girl" / "No Trust" produced by Rat Scabies, released on Glass Records. It was promoted with a tour supporting The Exploited.

The third and final single was a double A side "Anti-men" and "Misunderstood", again produced by Rat Scabies. A line up change saw Gary Dawson on Guitar after Haggis left to spend time building up his own garage business.

The band reformed in 2013 and played the Rebellion Punk Festival.
