= Chron Gen =

British musical band

- Origin: Letchworth, Hertfordshire, England
- Genres: Punk rock
- Years active: 1978-1985, 2013-Present
- Labels: Step Forward, Secret
- Members: Glynn Barber; Jon Johnson; Steve Aldridge; White
- Past members: Adam Warwicker; Jon Thurlow; Pete Dimmock; Mark Allison; Roy Horner; Fraser Britten

Chron Gen (short for Chronic Generation) are a British punk band, formed in January 1978 in Letchworth, Hertfordshire, England.

== History ==
Chron Gen initially comprised former members of The Condemned and Optional Xtras. Band members included Glynn (Baxter) Barber (vocals/guitarist), Jon 'JJ' Johnson (drummer), Adam Warwicker (bass guitar), and Jon Thurlow (rhythm guitar), with Pete Dimmock replacing Warwicker after the band recorded their first demo. The band released their debut EP Puppets of War in 1981 on their own Gargoyle label; It spent almost ten months in the UK Independent Chart, peaking at number 4. With the success of the EP, Chron Gen were invited to join The Exploited, Discharge, Anti-Pasti, and The Anti-Nowhere League on the now infamous Apocalypse tour in the UK in the summer of 1981. They released a single on the Step Forward label before moving to Secret Records, who issued the band's debut album, Chronic Generation, in March 1982. It reached number 53 on the UK Albums Chart, and was the last release to feature Thurlow, who was replaced by Mark 'Floyd' Allison. The band toured with Anti-Nowhere League on their 'So What' tour and toured the United States in support of the album. After a further single, Dimmock left to join Chelsea (and later Bandits at 4 O'Clock), and was replaced by Roy Horner. The band's final release was the 1984 mini-album Nowhere to Run, which was recorded before Horner joined and featured session musician Nigel Ross-Scott on bass. It did not match their earlier success and the band split up in October 1984. The band have played occasional reunion shows since.

Floyd later formed The Occasional Tables. He died on 31 October 1999. Pete Dimmock died on 12 August 2011.

Glynn Barber obtained his nickname 'Baxter' following his own surname being misspelt. He tours local pubs and clubs regularly as a solo artist using that name. He is also part of a glam rock tribute band, Rebel Rebel.

The surviving members of Chron Gen reformed for the Rebellion Festival 2013. As of 2019, Chron Gen continue to tour, playing the Rebellion Punk Festival again in 2016 and playing the 2019 London Punk Festival. They released an album entitled This is the Age (2016).

== Discography ==
Chart placings shown are from the UK Indie Chart, except where indicated.

=== Singles and EPs ===
- Puppets of War EP (1981), Gargoyle - (#4)
- "Reality" (1981), Step Forward - (#2)
- "Jet Boy, Jet Girl" (1982), Secret - (#4)
- "Outlaw" (1982), Secret
- "Nowhere to Run" (1984), Picasso - (#25)

=== Albums ===
- Chronic Generation (1982), Secret - (#2), (UK Albums Chart No. 53), initial copies came with a free Live 7-inch EP
- This is the Age (2016)

=== Live albums ===
- Apocalypse Live Tour June '81 (Live at Leicester) (1982), Chaos Tapes - (#15)
- Live at the Old Waldorf - San Francisco (1985), Picasso
- Free Live E.P. 7" recorded at the Regal Auditorium - Hitchin 9/12/81

=== Compilations ===
- The Best of Chron Gen (1994), Captain Oi!
- Puppets of War: The Collection (2004), Rhythm Vicar - (2 CD set with some previously unreleased material)
