= The Oppressed =

Welsh Oi! band

- Origin: Cardiff, Wales
- Genres: Oi!, punk
- Years active: 1981–1984, 1994–1996, 1998–2006, 2009–2016, 2020–present
- Labels: Oppressed Records, Step-1 Music, Oi! Records, Dojo, Knockout, Insurgence Records, Captain Oi! Records

The Oppressed are a Welsh Oi! band that formed in 1981 in Cardiff, Wales. Most of the band's lineups have been skinheads.

Throughout the band's career, the members (especially vocalist Roddy Moreno) openly expressed opposition to racism and fascism — in their lyrics, interviews, on-stage comments and other actions. In 1989, Moreno visited New York City and met a few members of Skinheads Against Racial Prejudice (SHARP). On his return to the United Kingdom, he started promoting SHARP ideals to British skinheads. The band has also had ties to other anti-racist groups, such as Anti-Fascist Action. Moreno is a Cardiff City F.C. supporter, and some of the band's songs express that support.

The band has split and re-formed several times, the first occasion being in 1984, after which Moreno focused on his record labels, Oi! Records and Ska Records for the remainder of the decade.

After splitting in 2016, they re-formed in 2020 with a line-up of Roddy Moreno (vocals/guitar), fellow founder member Russell "Ducky" Payne (guitar), Che Jones (drums) and Ross Goldworthy (bass).

== Discography ==
=== EPs ===
- Never Say Die (1983)
- Victims / Work Together (1983)
- Fuck Fascism (1995)
- 5-4-3-2-1 (1996)
- They Think Its All Over...It Is Now (1996)
- Anti-Fascist Oi! (1996)
- Best of The Oppressed Bonus 7 Inch (1996)
- "The Richard Allen Tribute Single" (1997)
- Strength In Unity (1997) [split w/Impact]
- The Noise (1997)
- Oppressed / Fatskins (1998)
- "Out on The Streets Again" (1999) [split w/Cock Sparrer]
- "Heavyweight Oi! Championshop of the World" [split w/Klasse Kriminale]
- Insurgence EP (2005)
- "Football Violence" (2008)
- 7er Jungs / The Oppressed (2010)
- Antifa Hooligans (2011)
- S.H.A.R.P. as a Razor (2011) [split w/The D Teez, The Bois]
- 2 Generations - 1 Message (2013) [split EP w/Wasted Youth]
- Blue Army (2013)

=== Studio and compilation albums ===
- Oi!Oi! Music (1984)
- Fatal Blow (1985)
- Dead & Buried (1988)
- Dead & Buried / Fatal Blow (1996)
- The Best of The Oppressed (1996)
- Music For Hooligans (1996)
- We Can Do Anything (1996)
- Live (Llanrumney Youth Club 1984) (1997)
- More Noize For The Boys (1998)
- Totally Oppressed (1999)
- Oi Singles & Rarities (2001)
- Skinhead Times 1982-1998 (double CD) (2005)
- Won't Say Sorry - The Complete Cover Story (double CD) (2005)

| Live At Crash In Freiburg : The Oppressed / Enraged Minority | Mad Butcher Records, Casual Records (4), Mangy Little Mut Records | | 2013 |
| The Oppressed / The Prowlers - Skins 'N' Punks Volume 6 | Oi! Records, Aggrobeat, Insurgence Records | | 2015 |
| Antifascist Oi! - Live And Loud!! (CD, Album) | Aggrobeat, Rusty Knife Records | ABCD040, RKR066 | 2016 |
| FCK FSCSM (This Is Anti-fascist Oi!) : The Oppressed / The Prowlers / The Bois / Enraged Minority / Camorra | Mad Butcher Records | | 2018 |

=== DVD ===
- Brotherhood: The Oppressed/The Prowlers Live in Toronto - 4.30.05 (2008)
