= Blitz (British band) =

English punk rock band

- Origin: New Mills, England
- Genres: Oi!, post-punk (later)
- Years active: 1980–2007
- Labels: No Future Records; Blitz Records; SOS Records
- Past members: Carl Fisher; Nidge Miller; Charlie Howe; Neil McLennan; Shawn Attack; Paul Lilley; Neil Hufferdine; Steve Cast />Matt Renicks

Blitz were an English punk rock band from New Mills, Derbyshire, formed in 1980 which recorded several singles, EPs and albums.

== Core history ==
The original Blitz line-up consisted of Carl Fisher (vocals), Charlie Howe (percussion), Nidge Miller (guitar), and Neil "Mackie" McLennan (bass). The band had success in the United Kingdom indie charts in the early 1980s. With both punk and skinhead members, they were enthusiastically championed by Sounds magazine writer Garry Bushell. They had sent him their demo tape early in 1981. Bushell who labeled them Oi!, was impressed enough to put two of their tracks on that year's Carry On Oi compilation: "Nation On Fire" and "Youth". He helped them secure a deal with the record label No Future. When the band slept at his family home on the Ferrier Estate in Kidbrooke, a rough south east London council estate, he recalls them being "freaked out by being in a real concrete jungle" (Bushell On The Rampage). Guitarist Alan "Nidge" Miller would later go on to denounce Bushell, but they reconciled before his death.

The band signed to the No Future label in 1981, and their first release was the 7-inch EP All Out Attack. Their debut album Voice of a Generation received a five star review from Bushell in Sounds.

After Fisher and McLennan had a disagreement, Fisher and Howe formed their own band. Fisher moved to Australia, according to Miller, working with computers. Miller and McLennan briefly went under the banner of Rose of Victory for one last single on No Future, before returning to the Blitz band name.

In 1983 they produced Second Empire Justice on the No Future label with Tim Harris (guitar, keyboards), crediting Mackie. Because of its departure into post punk and new wave characteristics it did not do well with the original Oi! fan audience. The album was commercially unsuccessful at the time, the No Future label sank, because Blitz was their main income, and with it the Fisher and Howe arrangement.

According to Miller, the band split up because the original members had no interest in "touring, plus they were never really into the music". In 2011 Mackie McLennan moved to guitar and formed the band "Epic Problem", based in New Mills. They have released two EPs and one full-length album. Mackie's latest band is Rivalry, formed in late 2022.

It was Miller alone who produced the 1989 album The Killing Dream playing all instruments (guitars, bass, drums) with Gary Basnett handling the vocals. Bassist Paul Lilley was recruited for gigs, and was a full member of the band by the time of their last single the New Breed E.P. in 1992, though the single cover carried the message "To those who say Blitz is now a one man band - it always was!"

== Later history ==
After a hiatus for the band, Miller recruited a floating roster of new members in the early 2000s, including Doug Williams on guitar, Brian Lawton on bass, and James Greene on drums, and performed concerts under the Blitz name, Lawton replacing Williams on guitar, and a new Bassist Marc stepping in for later live gigs. Six new tracks appeared as part of a best of compilation in 2005, the only studio recordings of these later line-ups. On 10 February 2007, Miller was struck by a car and died on impact when "wandering into the freeway" after a show in Austin, Texas. "With just two dates left on the month-long tour" Miller was 48 years old when he died. The final six Blitz recordings were repackaged as a mini-album as The Final Blitz in 2016, and a live album recorded at CBGBs released in 2019.

== Partial discography ==
Chart placings shown from the UK Indie Chart.

=== Albums ===
- Voice of a Generation (1982), No. 2
- Second Empire Justice (1983), No. 5
- The Killing Dream (1989)

=== Singles and EPs ===
- "All Out Attack E.P." (1981), No. 3
- "Warriors" (1982), No. 2
- "Never Surrender" / "Razors in the Night" (1982), No. 2
- "Propaganda" / "Moscow" (1982)
- "Solar" (1983)
- "Telecommunications" (1983), No. 3
- "New Age" (1983), No. 4
- "New Breed EP" (1992)
- "The Final Blitz - Farewell To A Legend" (2016)

=== Compilation albums ===
- Blitzed An All Out Attack (1988)
- Best of Blitz (3 February 1992)
- The Complete Blitz Singles Collection (1994)
- Blitz Hits (1994)
- All Out Attack (1999)
- Warriors (1999)
- Voice Of A Generation - The No Future Years (2000)
- Punk Singles And Rarities 1980-83 (2001)
- Never Surrender (The Best Of Blitz) (2005)
- All Out Blitz: The Very Best Of (2005)
- Hits (2006)
- Time Bomb Early Singles And Demos Collection (2013)

=== Music videos ===
- "New Age" (1983)

=== Appearances on compilations ===
- Carry on Oi (1981)
- Punk And Disorderly: Someone's Gonna Die (1982)
- Seeds IV Punk (1987)
- Gothik: Music From The Dark Side (1995)
- The Crazy World of Punk (1996)
- Oi! Chartbusters vols. 1-2-3-4
- Oi! The Picture Disc vols. 1 & 2 (Link Records, 1987 and 1988)
