= Infa Riot =

English punk rock band

- Origin: London, England
- Genres: Punk rock, Oi!
- Years active: 1980–1985, 2011–present
- Labels: Secret Records, Panache Records, Randale Records
- Members: Lee Wilson; Barry Damery; Chris Lloyd; Tom Eagle
- Past members: Floyd Wilson; Mark Reynolds; Alex Cardarelli
- Website: Official website

Infa Riot is an English punk rock band formed in 1980 in Wood Green, North London, England by vocalist Lee Wilson and guitarist Barry D'Amery. The name Infa-Riot is an abbreviation for "In for a Riot".

== History ==
Infa-Riot played their first gig as supporting act for Angelic Upstarts in the Lordship Pub, Wood Green (now a betting shop). Their fourth gig was reviewed in the Sounds magazine by Thomas "Mensi" Mensforth of Angelic Upstarts. Two Infa Riot tracks were issued in the legendary Strength Through Oi! compilation in May 1981 and their classic song Each Dawn I die was issued in the follow-up compilation Carry On Oi later in 1981. Their first single Kids of the '80's was released in September 1981. The single peaked number 2 at the UK Indie Chart in February 1982. Infa Riot's second single, The Winner came out in May 1982 and the debut album Still Out of Order in August. The album spent four weeks in the UK Albums Chart reaching number 42.

In 1984 Infa Riot changed their name for the less controversial The Infas and released their second album Sound & Fury. The Infas played their last gig in November 1985. It was recorded and released in 1988 in the Live and Loud!! series by Link Records. The band was formed again in 2011. The band played in Tel Aviv in 2018.

== Band members ==
- Lee Wilson – vocals
- Barry Damery – guitar
- Chris Lloyd – bass
- Tom Eagle – drums

== Discography ==
=== Singles ===
- "Kids of the '80's" (1981)
- "The Winner" (1982)
- "Sound & Fury" (1984)
- "Bootboys" (2011, split single with The Gonads)

=== Studio albums ===
- Still Out of Order (1982)
- Sound & Fury (1984)
- Old and Angry (2017)

=== Compilations and live albums ===
- Live and Loud!! (1988)
- The Best of Infa Riot (2005)
