= Splodgenessabounds =

English punk rock band

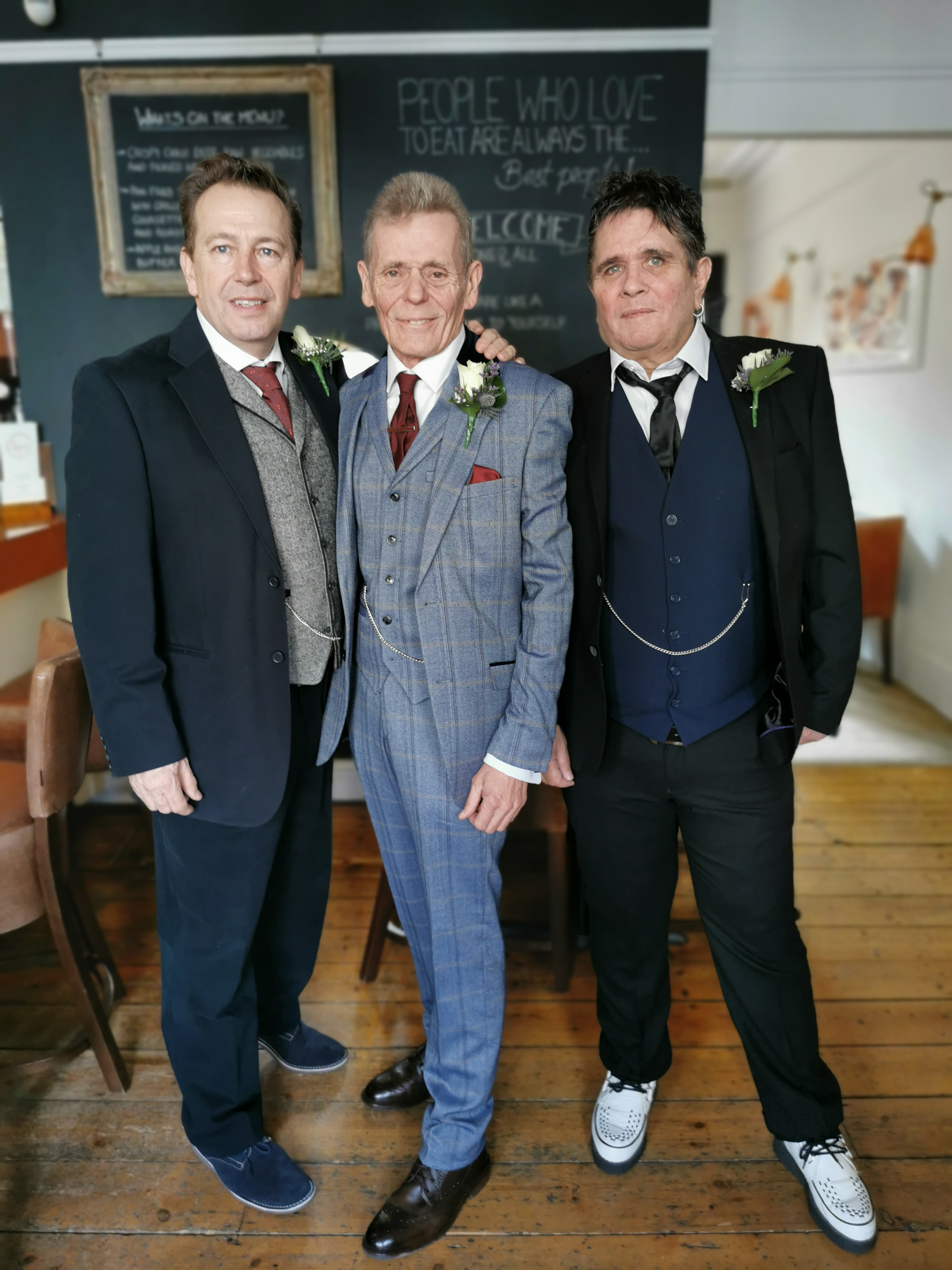
- Splodgenessabounds front man Max Splodge with former members Vil Strang and Ricci Ticci

Background information
- Origin: Queens Road, Peckham, South London, England
- Genres: Punk rock, Oi!, punk pathetique
- Years active: 1978–present
- Labels: Deram, Razor
- Members: Max Splodge; Mat Sargent; Johnny Chunders; Harry Monk
- Past members: Ronny Rocka; Min Plimpton; Noel Hendrick; Mick English; Tentpeg Taff; Lefty; Little Willy; Chrissie (Baby Greensleeves); Desert Island Joe Slythe; Miles Flat; Pat Thetic Noble; Roger Rodent; Wiffy Archer; Winston Forbes; Squint; Keith Boyce; Vil Strang; Benjie Bollox; Ricci Ticci; Stretch Armstrong; Matthew Myles

Splodgenessabounds are an English punk rock band formed in Peckham, London. The band is associated with the Oi! and punk pathetique genres. Their frontman is Max Splodge (born Martin Everest). They have scored three UK singles chart entries, including one Top 10 hit and a second Top 30 hit.

== Career ==
The band was formed over a cab office called Baron Cars in Queens Road, Peckham. The group members are from Orpington.

The band were originally fronted by Max Splodge (formerly drummer in punk bands The Tarts and The Mistakes) and his girlfriend of the time, who was known as Baby Greensleeves. The band won a recording contract with Deram Records after finishing runner-up in the 1979 Battle of the Bands contest, even though Deram was planning to cease all activities in the music markets outside of classical music. The band's first release for Deram in 1980 was "Two Pints of Lager and a Packet of Crisps Please". The song consists of a man attempting to order two pints of lager and a packet of crisps from a pub, but he is repeatedly ignored. He becomes increasingly impatient, and time is called before his request is fulfilled. The song was released as a triple A side vinyl single, along with "Simon Templer" (a pastiche of the theme tune of the TV series, Return of the Saint featuring the character Simon Templar) and "Michael Booth's Talking Bum".

"Two Pints of Lager and a Packet of Crisps Please" was the only song from that release that picked up any airplay, first from John Peel on his BBC Radio 1 show, and later on daytime radio as a novelty song. The song peaked at No. 7 in the UK singles chart in June 1980, however the band members were unable to capitalise on their success by appearing on Top of the Pops, because the show was off the air due to strike action at BBC Television.

The follow-up to "Two Pints of Lager and a Packet of Crisps Please" was a cover version of "Two Little Boys" (a live version that appeared in the soundtrack to the 1981 film, Urgh! A Music War). It was a quadruple A-side, with "Horse", "The Butterfly Song" and "Sox". The initial copies of the single came with a cardboard boomerang, 'guaranteed not to come back'. The band then performed on Top of the Pops, but the single only reached No. 26 in September 1980. Their eponymous debut album (released in January 1981 when the band was on hiatus) failed to chart.

In the band's early days, they were noted for playing pranks. These included leaving Splodge stranded on top of a set of speakers for an entire set; supporting themselves when the support band failed to show by playing the wrong instruments badly at deafening volume levels; and a stunt where Splodge was rumoured to be held in Maidstone Prison and came on stage handcuffed to a prison officer. Splodgenessabounds' stage show sometimes went to carnivalesque extremes. Police were frequenting their concerts, due to unsubstantiated reports of public nudity and "farting on demand" during renditions of "Michael Booth's Talking Bum".

The group often made humorously grandiose press release claims, such as that their debut album would be a triple, including a side of "old material transcribed from their own cassettes, coupled with their 'Pathetic Movements Manifesto', and including a free Christmas tree with every copy."

Splodge got back into the studio – having lost the rest of his band in 1980 – with help from the Heavy Metal Kids, whose lead singer and guitarist Gary Holton was a friend of Splodge and sometime member of Splodgenessabounds. Their single "Cowpunk Medlum" (a medley of the theme song of the Western film High Noon, a section of "Ghost Riders in the Sky" and the TV series Bonanza) reached No. 69 in June 1981, but after this, Deram terminated the band's recording contract. Nevertheless, the new Splodgenessabounds (temporarily shortened to Splodge for legal reasons) released a follow-up single, "Mouth and Trousers", along with the album In Search of the Seven Golden Gussets on the independent Razor Records. Despite the single getting good airplay and favourable reviews (being a ska song rather than their usual punk style), without the backing of Deram Records, it became the first Splodgenessabounds single to fail to chart.

A new album, A Nightmare on Rude Street was recorded in 1991, but sales and reviews were poor. Splodge continued the band with various line-ups also pursuing his career as an actor and bingo caller, as well as playing with Angelic Upstarts.

In 1999, after going for a DNA blood test, Splodge discovered he was a direct descendant of Genghis Khan. Splodge penned five songs: "Genghis Khan", "Lulluby of Mongolia", "These Are the Things That Make the Mongols So Great", "Too Mongolia" and "Mongols on the Streets of London" (written with Mat Sargent of Sham 69).

Two subsequent albums I Don't Know (2000) and The Artful Splodger (2001) recorded and produced by Dave Goodman, were released by Captain Oi! Records. The albums sold well and the band did two UK and European tours, and also appeared in Canada and the United States.

A live show in Brighton was released on DVD in 2005 and featured Motörhead guitarist Würzel who often guested with Splodge, and also a joint single with John Otway, "No Offence – None Taken", (available for download only).

In 2006, the band appeared on Harry Hill's TV Burp, after being featured on Rock School with Gene Simmons. Splodgenessabounds performed at the end of the show, accompanied by Hill dressed as "The Demon", Gene Simmons.

In 2008, Splodge recorded a new song; "You've Been Splodged", this was released on an Oi compilation album.

In 2012, Splodge recorded a Christmas song that appeared on a punk compilation album called Cashing in on Christmas, which was released on Black Hole Records.

Splodge can still be found touring with Bad Manners and is a regular performer at the Rebellion Festival. Max also hosts the bingo at the festival which opens the acoustic stage each day.

== Partial discography ==
=== Singles ===
- "Simon Templer" / "Michael Booth's Talking Bum" / "Two Pints of Lager and a Packet of Crisps Please" (Deram, Cat no. BUM1) – 1980 – UK Number 7
- "Two Little Boys" / "Horse" / "Sox" / "Butterfly" (Deram), Cat no. ROLF1 – 1980 – UK Number 26
- "Cowpunk Medlum" / "Brown Paper" / "Have You Got a Light Boy?" / "Morning Milky" – (Early copies came with a Flexi disc with "Yarmouth 5-0 (a parody of Hawaii 5–0) and Brown Paper (dub)) – (Deram, Cat no. BUM3) – 1981 – UK Number 69

=== Studio albums ===
- Splodgenessabounds (Deram, Cat no. SML1121) – 1981
- In Search of the Seven Golden Gussets (Razor Records, Cat no. RAZ1) – 1982 (as Splodge)
- Nightmare on Rude Street (Receiver) – 1991
- I Don't Know – 2000
- The Artful Splodger – 2001
- Best of Live recorded at Brighton Concorde 2, 15th December 2003 (Secret Records) – 2021

=== DVDs ===
- Two Pints of Lager and a Packet of Crisps Please (Secret Records) – 2005

== Band members ==
=== Original line-up ===
- Max Splodge – Vocals
- Christine Miller (Chrissie aka Baby Greensleeves) – Backing vocals
- Desert Island Joe Slythe – Coconuts
- Miles Flat – Guitar
- Pat Thetic Noble – Guitar
- Roger Rodent – Bass guitar
- Wiffy Archer – Comb and paper
- Winston Forbes – Keyboards
- Squint – Windows
- Keith Boyce – Drums

=== Later line-ups ===
On I Don't Know

- Max Splodge – Vocals, trombone
- Richard Stone – Guitars
- Mat Sargent (Chelsea, ex Sham 69) – Bass
- Min Johnson – Saxophone
- Harry Monk – Drums

On The Artful Splodger

- Max Splodge – Vocals, trombone, arranger
- Darrell Bath (ex Dogs D'Amour) / Würzel (Motörhead) / Garrie Lammin (ex Cock Sparrer) – Guest guitars
- Micky Fitz (The Business) – Guest vocals
- Steve Whale – Vocals

== See also ==
- List of punk bands from the United Kingdom
- List of 1970s punk rock musicians
- List of Peel Sessions
- Timeline of punk rock
