= Garry Bushell =

English journalist, musician and activist

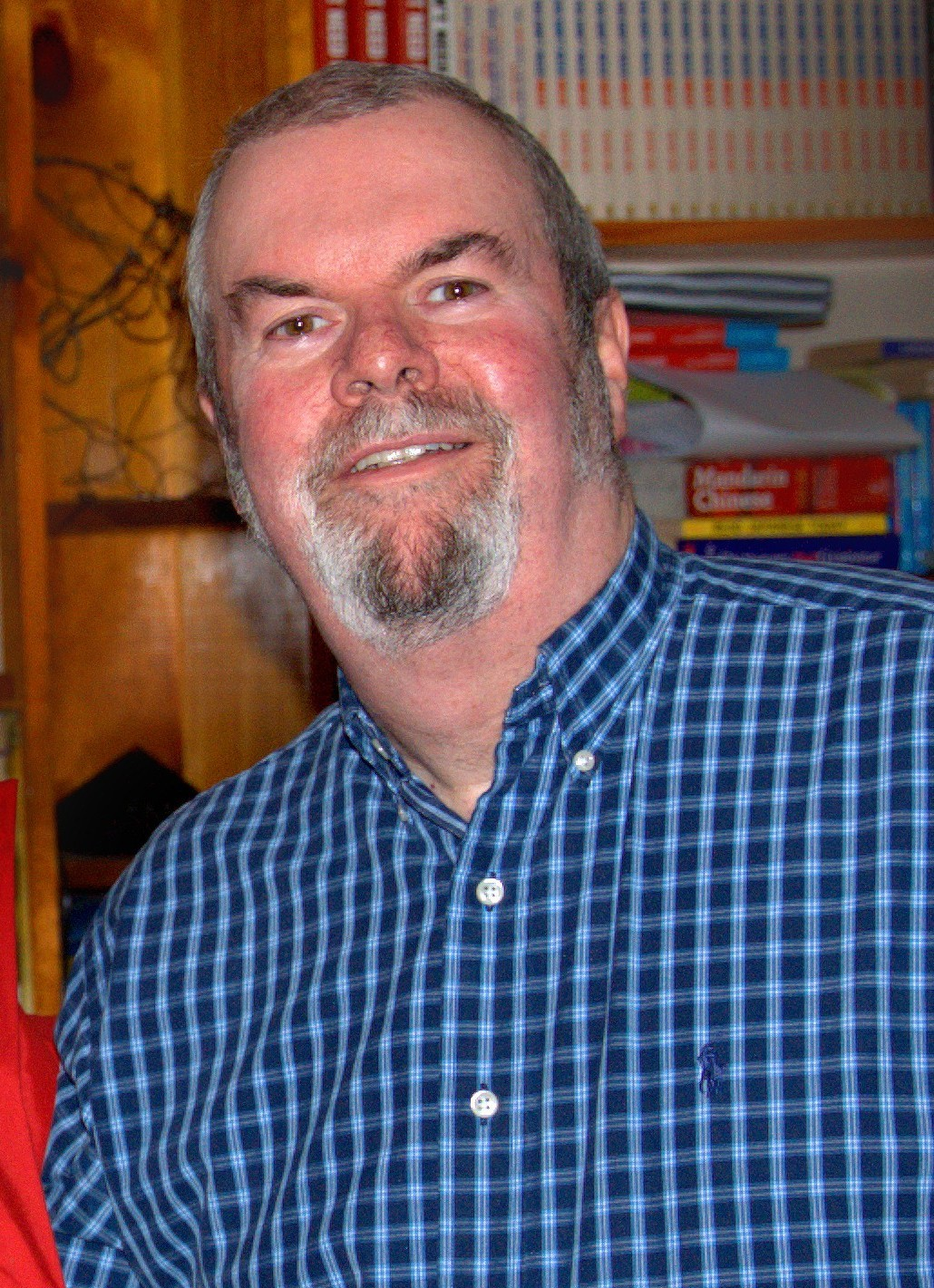
- Bushell in 2014
- Born: 13 May 1955 (age 71) Woolwich, London, England
- Occupation: Musician; music journalist; author; political activist; television presenter
- Subject: Music; television
- Years active: 1973–present
- Children: 5

Garry Bushell (born 13 May 1955) is an English newspaper columnist, rock music journalist, television presenter, author, musician and political activist. Bushell also sings in the south-east London Oi! bands GBX and the Gonads. He managed the New York City Oi! band Maninblack until the death of the band frontman Andre Schlessinger. Bushell's recurring topical themes are comedy, country and class. He has campaigned for an English Parliament, a Benny Hill statue and for variety and talent shows on TV. He has been a columnist for several newspapers, including The Sun, The People and the Daily Star Sunday, and has worked as the review editor for the Sunday Express.

== Early life and music career ==
The son of a fireman, Bushell attended Charlton Manor School and Colfe's School (which was then a grammar school). At secondary school, he first performed in the group Pink Tent, which was heavily influenced by Monty Python. They wrote songs and comedy sketches; performed at parties and at each other's houses. Bushell was involved in the National Union of School Students and the Schools Action Union, a socialist organisation that had a strong situationist streak that led them to mix schoolboy hijinks with student activism. He worked for Shell as a messenger, and then the London Fire Brigade before attending North East London Polytechnic and the London College of Printing simultaneously.

Pink Tent evolved into 1977 punk band the Gonads, who have also described themselves Oi!, punk pathetique and "Oi-Tone" because they play ska and street punk. Many of their songs are comical party tunes, but they have occasionally written more serious material. Two examples of their songs that include social commentary are "Dying for a Pint" (which comments on nightclub bouncer brutality) and "Jobs Not Jails" (a critique of the Margaret Thatcher government's policies).

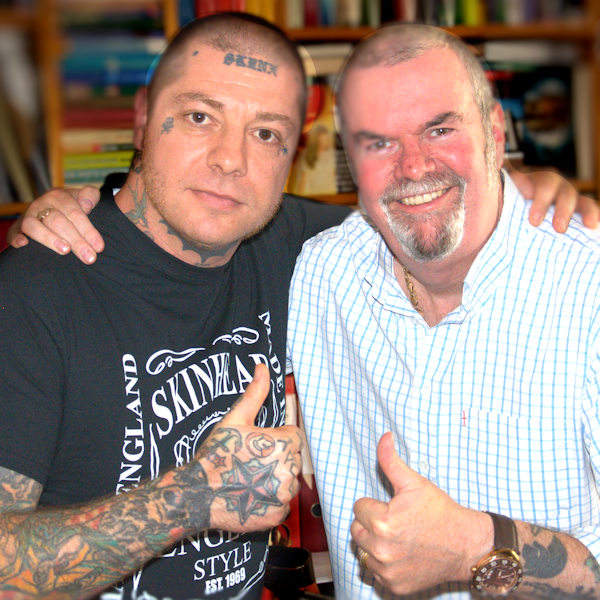
Lars Frederiksen, guitarist and vocalist for the punk rock band Rancid, with journalist Garry Bushell

Other Bushell musical projects have included the bands Prole, Orgasm Guerrillas, the Ska-Nads and Lord Waistrel & the Cosh Boys. Prole was a socialist punk band that also included Steve Kent, the original guitarist of the Oi! band the Business. Bushell managed the Blood and Cockney Rejects, getting them their EMI deal. He also got Twisted Sister signed in the UK to Secret Records. He compiled the first four Oi! compilation albums and contributed songs to later collections.

== Journalism and writing ==
In 1973, at the age of 18, Bushell joined the International Socialists and started writing for their newspaper Socialist Worker. He also wrote for Temporary Hoarding, Rebel, and his own punk fanzine Napalm, and edited the North East London Polytechnic Student Union magazine NEPAM. From 1978 to 1985, he wrote for Sounds magazine, covering punk and other street-level music genres, such as 2 Tone, the new wave of British heavy metal and the mod revival. Bushell was at the forefront of covering the Oi! subgenre, also known as real punk or street punk. In 1981, when Strength Thru Oi! was released, it was controversial because its title was a play on a Nazi slogan, "Strength Through Joy", and the cover featured Nicky Crane, a British Movement activist who was serving a four-year sentence for racist violence. Garry Bushell, who was responsible for compiling the album, insists its title was a pun on The Skids' EP Strength Through Joy and that he had been unaware of the Nazi connotations. He also denied knowing the identity of the skinhead on the album's cover until it was exposed by the Daily Mail two months later. The same year, Bushell wrote the book Dance Craze – the 2-Tone story, and in 1984, he wrote the Iron Maiden biography Running Free.

His scathing reviews of the early punk incarnation of Adam and the Ants led to him being name-checked, along with veteran NME writer Nick Kent, in the band's song "Press Darlings", containing the line "If passion ends in fashion, Bushell is the best dressed man in town." On the studio version, immediately after this line, lead singer Adam Ant can be heard muttering "You can say that again, the scruffy sod!" Bushell also attracted the attentions of Crass who responded to his criticisms with the song "Hurry Up Garry" and the Notsensibles who released the song "Garry Bushell's Band Of The Week".

Bushell moved to Fleet Street in 1985, working for The Sun, Evening Standard and the Daily Mirror. He went back to The Sun to write its "Bizarre" column and to be the showbusiness editor. In 1991, he briefly became assistant editor of the Daily Star, where he wrote a current affairs column called "Walk Tall With Bushell", as well as his TV column. Three months later, he quit and returned to The Sun.

In 1990 the Press Council adjudicated against The Sun and Garry Bushell for his use of derogatory terminology about gay people. Bushell's columns contained terminology including “woofter” and “poof”, attacks on television programmes that “promote homosexuality,” and lines such as, “It must be true what they say about nobody being all bad … even Stalin banned poofs!”

In 1994, Bushell was named critic of the year at the UK Press Awards. In the mid-1990s, Bushell hosted the TV programme Bushell on the Box, commenting on the week's TV programmes. The show included rants, interviews, star guests and comedy sketches. The following year, Bushell became resident critic on Jonathan Ross's ITV series The Big Big Talent Show. He also hosted Garry Bushell Reveals All for Granada Men & Motors. He has appeared on a wide range of other shows, including Celebrity Squares, Noel's House Party, Drop! The Celebrity, Newsnight and This Morning. In 2001, he was resident TV critic of The Big Breakfast.

In 2001, Bushell's crime novel The Face about undercover detective Harry Tyler was serialised in the Daily Star, leading to his dismissal from The Sun, even though the book's publisher John Blake admitted Bushell had no knowledge of the serialisation deal. After he was dismissed, he started legal proceedings against The Sun who settled out of court.

In 2002, Bushell published the book King of Telly: The Best of Bushell on the Box, containing highlights of his column. He has since published two more Harry Tyler novels, Two-Faced and Facedown. A fourth is due out in 2021.

After The Sun, Bushell wrote for The People until 18 February 2007 when he left to work on books and screenplays. He announced his resignation as a TV critic, stating that he was becoming depressed at the state of British television. In 2005, Bushell co-wrote Cockney Reject, the autobiography of Jeff "Stinky" Turner (née Geggus) of punk band Cockney Rejects, and penned a film script for Join the Rejects – Get Yourself Killed, an abortive feature film project on the band which was replaced by a documentary film, East End Babylon.

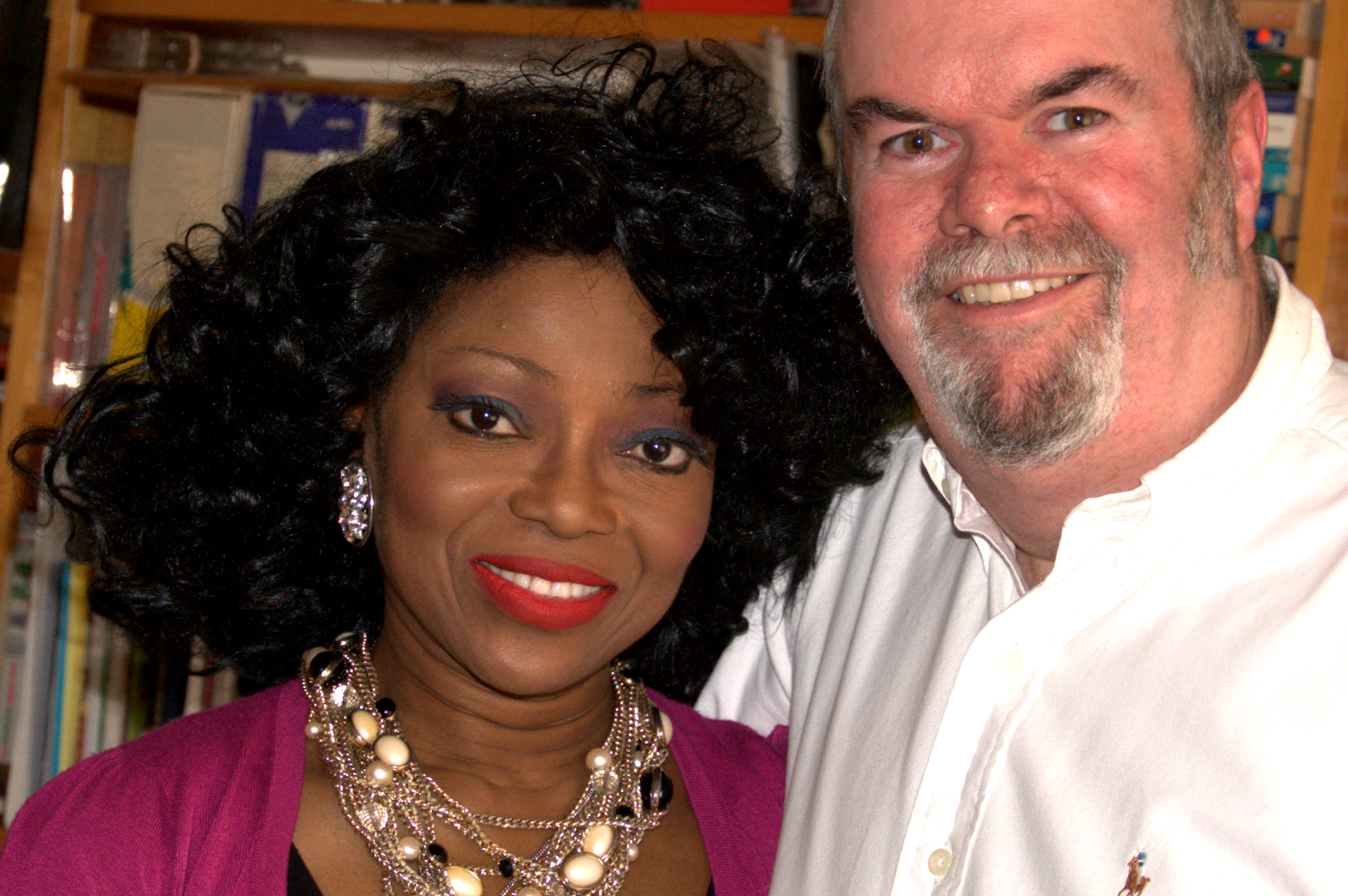
Garry Bushell with singer and actress Patti Boulaye

Bushell has published his own autobiography, Bushell on the Rampage, a book attacking the BBC soap opera EastEnders called 1001 Reasons EastEnders is Pony, and a book on UK youth subcultures called Hoolies. He has also co-written the autobiography of Cockney comic Jimmy Jones, Now This is a Very True Story, published in 2011 and a new expanded version of Dance Craze, about 2-Tone, which is subtitled 'Rude Boys on the Road'. In May 2007, Bushell's column returned to the Daily Star Sunday.

In August 2007, Bushell made a remark during an exchange on the Talksport programme Football First implying that homosexuality was a perversion, leading the regulator Ofcom to find the segment in breach of standards for failing to justify offensive material by the context in which it was presented.

Ofcom rejected talkSPORT's claims that the comments made had been "off the cuff", and talkSPORT issued a statement saying its staff had been "made aware" that what Bushell had said was "unacceptable". Bushell later said that it was not homosexuality which he was referring to as a perversion, but the further lowering of the age of consent; and that his remarks were taken out of context. He has since left talkSPORT. In his 2009 book, The World According To..., Bushell says he made the remark to wind up another broadcaster.

In 2007, Bushell started presenting a monthly punk and ska podcast show on TotalRock, and the Heritage Foundation named Bushell "Critic of the Year". In 2009 he started an occasional punk and ska show called Rancid Sounds for Total Rock radio.

In January 2024, Bushell retired from his Daily Star column, but brought the Bushell on the Box brand back to screens via Jim Davidson's Ustreme.

== Writing style ==
Bushell's columns are known for their similes and metaphors, such as describing (in his 1 May 2005 column) "Today's TV is so obsessively gay, it's a wonder the Radio Times doesn't come with a pink Versace wrap and a free glass of Muscadet". His humour angered some Sun executives, such as Rebekah Wade. His tabloid column and writing style were once satirised in adult comic Viz, including a one-off comic strip titled Garry Bushell The Bear, about a homophobic, xenophobic brown bear.

Responding to comments made by Bushell in the 25 November 1993 issue of The Sun ("Liberal permissiveness is eating the fabric of our society. You want video nasties peddling stomach-churning filth? You got 'em. Western values? Who needs 'em!"), John Martin's book Seduction of the Gullible: The Truth Behind the Video Nasty Scandal says: "[w]hen Bushell isn't blustering about decency and Western values, he can be found gloating and cracking jokes in his column over such incidents as the death of several transvestites in a sex cinema fire."

== Politics ==
Bushell started his political activism as a socialist and was a member of the Trotskyist International Socialists (which became the Socialist Workers Party). In 1986, in his '"On the Soap Box" column, Bushell raged against the middle classes, who he said had ruined the Labour Party. He has opposed the European Union and unfettered immigration, because he said it undercut working class wages. He has written articles supporting the Smithfield meat porters who were fighting to preserve their market, and in favour of working class comedians and Page 3 girls. He has campaigned to have St George's Day recognised as a public holiday in England, in the same way St Patrick's Day is a holiday in Ireland.

In the 2005 General Election, he stood as a candidate for the English Democrats Party, who promote the establishment of an English Parliament, and who wanted England to leave the European Union. Bushell got 1,216 votes (3.4% share) in the Greenwich and Woolwich constituency, finishing fifth out of seven in a race won by Nick Raynsford of the Labour Party. The result represented the high point for the English Democrats in the election, and Bushell finished ahead of the UK Independence Party candidate in that constituency. Bushell also represented the party in South Staffordshire, in the delayed vote (due to the death of a candidate) on 23 June; winning 643 votes (2.51%). His campaign was supported by the Campaign for an English Parliament and Veritas. He considered running for Mayor of London against Ken Livingstone in 2008, but he pulled out of the race in January 2008 and stood aside for Matt O'Connor. Bushell announced on 7 December 2011 that he would join and support UKIP.

=== Elections contested ===
UK General elections

Date of election	Constituency	Party	Votes	%
2005	Greenwich & Woolwich	English Democrats	1,216	3.4
2005	Staffordshire South	English Democrats	643	2.5

== Personal life ==
Bushell has five children, three with Carol Bushell and two with Tania Bushell. He lives in Sidcup, south-east London.

== Bibliography ==
Novels

- The Face (2001)
- Two-Faced (2004)
- Face Down (2013)
- All or Nothing (2019)
- Hell Bent (2019)

Non-fiction

- Running Free – The Authorised Biography of Iron Maiden (1984)
- Twisted Sister – The First Official Book (1985)
- Ozzie Osborne: Diary of a Mad Man (with Mick Wall and Stephen Rea) (1985)
- The Best of Garry's Goofs (1992)
- Cockney Reject (with Jeff Turner) (2005)
- The World According to Garry Bushell (2008)
- Hoolies (2010)
- Now This Is a Very True Story (2010)
- Dance Craze – Rude Boys on the Road (2012)
- Time for Action (2012)
- 1001 Reasons EastEnders Is 'Pony' (2015)
- Sounds of Glory (2016)
- 1979: The Ska Revival (2019)
- 1979: Time For Action, The Mod Revival (2019)

== Discography ==
- The Gonads: Live – The Official Bootleg (1984)
- Live & Loud (1988)
- Back and Barking (1999)
- Schitz-Oi!-Phrenia (2001)
- Old Boots, No Panties (2006)
- Live Free, Die Free (2009)
- Glorious Bastards (2010)
- Greater Hits Volume One: Plums (2011)
- Greater Hits Volume Two: The Mutt's Nuts (2012)
- Built for Destruction (2013)
- Greater Hits Volume Three: The Complete Cobblers (2015)
- London Bawling (2016)
- All the Loon Stompers (2017)
- American Gonads (2018)
