= The Adicts =

British punk rock band

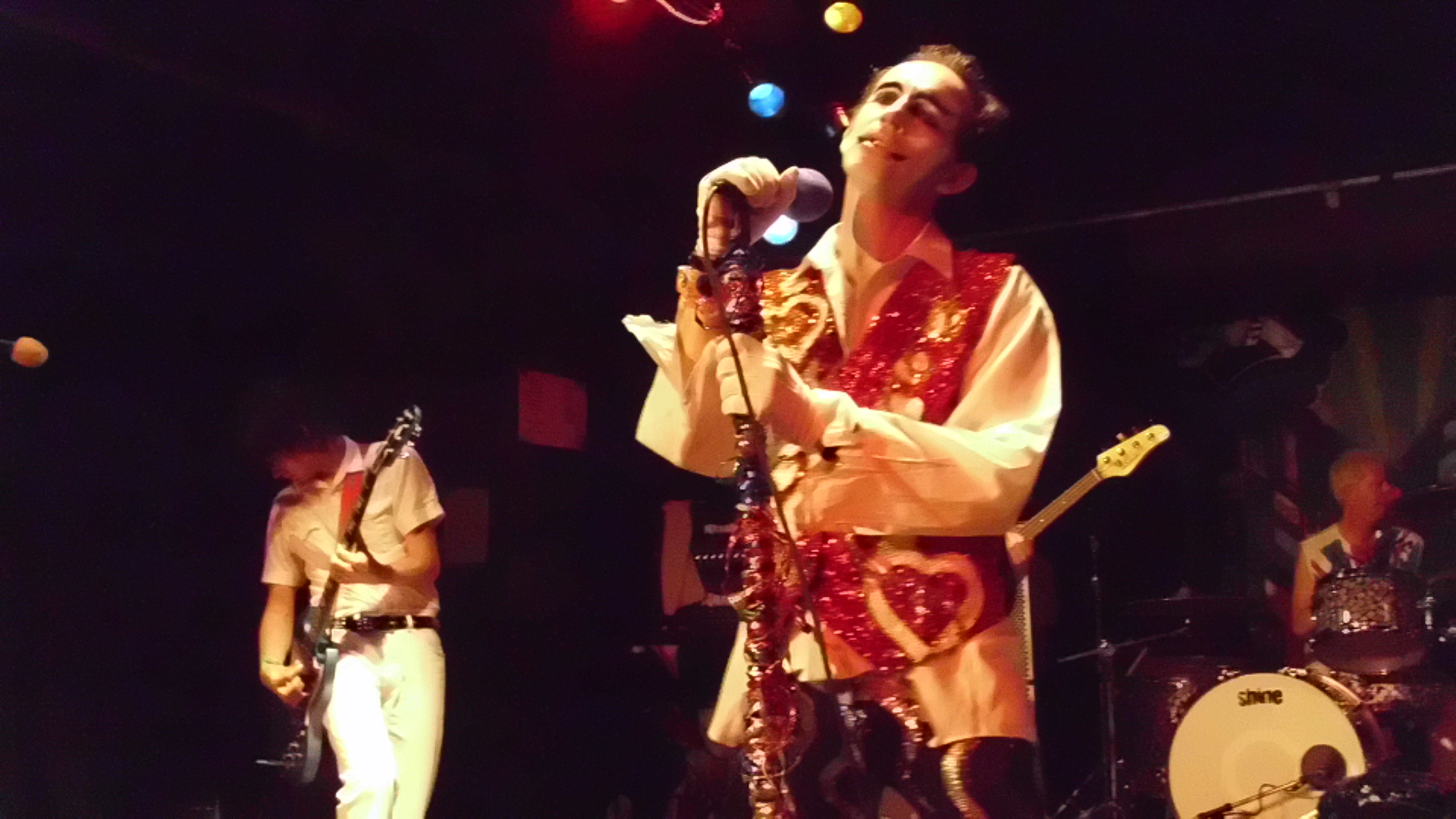
- The Adicts in Chicago, 2011

Background information
- Also known as: Fun Adicts, ADX
- Origin: Ipswich, Suffolk, England
- Genre: Punk rock
- Years active: 1977–1993; 2000–present
- Labels: Dining Out; Dwed Wecords; Razor; Fallout; Sire; SL; Cleopatra; Anagram; Captain Oi!; SOS; People Like You; DC-Jam; Nuclear Blast; Adicts Records
- Website: https://theadicts.net/

The Adicts are a British punk rock band from Ipswich, Suffolk, England. A popular English punk rock band of the 1980s, they were often in the punk charts during that decade.

The Adicts originated as The Afterbirth in late 1975 but never had any music or played any shows. They later became The Pinz. They soon changed their name to the Adicts and became known for their distinctive Clockwork Orange "droog" image. "Droog" is a noun derived from the fictional Nadsat language, (a combination of Russian and English) meaning "friend". This image, along with their urgent, uptempo music and light-hearted lyrics, helped set them apart from other punk bands. In the 1980s, they temporarily changed their name to Fun Adicts (for a children's TV appearance) and then ADX (after signing to a major label).

Their music has catchy melodies and lyrics, often featuring extra instruments and sound clips - such as carousel music in "How Sad", violin played by Derick Cook in "Joker in the Pack", as well as gongs and keyboard percussion by Anthony Boyd in "Chinese Takeaway".

The musicians wear all-white clothing with black boots and black bowler hats. The singer, Keith "Monkey" Warren, wears joker makeup, wildly patterned suits (such as checkerboard or polka dot), flared trousers, colourful dress shirts, a bowler hat, gloves, and more recent years large wings. The band's visual look is complemented by their stage shows, involving items such as streamers, confetti, playing cards, beach balls, joker hats, toy instruments, bubbles, and glitter.

== History ==
The band debuted with the 1979 EP Lunch with the Adicts, the first release on the Dining Out label. In 1980, the band recorded the songs "Sympathy" and "Sheer Enjoyment" for an intended single, but they were not released until the 1984 compilation album This Is Your Life. The band released their debut album, Songs of Praise, in 1981 on their own Dwed Wecords, funded by the band's then-manager Geordie Davison. In 1982, the album was re-released on Fallout Records, who also issued their first single "Viva la Revolution", which became one of the band's most iconic songs. That same year, the band began their relationship with Razor Records and released their second album, Sound of Music, featuring the single "Chinese Takeaway".

In 1983, the band released "Bad Boy", their highest-charting single. The success of that single led to the band signing with Warner Bros. Records offshoot Sire Records. At this time, the band changed their name to ADX at the behest of Sire, as the name the Adicts was considered to have too much of a negative connotation. The relationship with Sire only lasted for two singles, "Tokyo" (produced by Vapors frontman David Fenton in 1984) and a cover of Marlene Dietrich's "Falling in Love Again" in 1985. Their third album, Smart Alex, featuring previous singles "Bad Boy" and "Tokyo", was issued in 1985 on Razor Records. The band's third release of that year was the Bar Room Bop EP, for which they returned to Fallout. Their fourth album, 1986's Fifth Overture, was initially released only in Germany, and did not see release in their home country until the following year.

The band then entered a period of inactivity, only releasing the live albums Live and Loud!!, recorded in 1981 and released in 1987, and Rockers into Orbit, recorded in 1986 and released in 1990. The band's next studio album finally appeared in 1992, when the US label Cleopatra Records released Twenty-Seven, which was not released in the UK until a year later on Anagram Records. Cleopatra reissued the band's first three albums in 1993, giving those discs their first release in the US.

Another period of inactivity ensued, this time lasting until 2002. That year, the band's first album in a decade, Rise and Shine was released on Captain Oi! Records, who also released expanded reissues of all of the band's previous albums with the exception of Songs of Praise. Two years later, the Rollercoaster album was released on the US label SOS Records; it has never been officially released in the UK. Over the next couple of years, SOS released their own expanded reissues of Sound of Music, Smart Alex, Twenty-Seven and Rise and Shine. The Adicts' next album was a newly recorded version of their debut Songs of Praise, which was released in 2008 on the European label People Like You Records. A year later, the band released Life Goes On on the same label. In 2012, All the Young Droogs was released on DC-Jam Records.

In 2017, the Adicts signed to Nuclear Blast, and announced a late 2017 release for the album And It Was So!.

In 2024, the Adicts remastered their debut album "Songs of Praise" at Abbey Road Studios and released the LP on Adicts Records.

== Discography ==
=== Studio albums ===
Title	Release date	Record label	Peak positions	
Title	Release date	Record label	UK	UK Indie
Songs of Praise	1981	Dwed Records	–	15
Sound of Music	1982	Razor Records	99	2
Smart Alex	1985	Razor Records	–	7
Fifth Overture	1986	SL Records	–	7
Twenty-Seven	1992	Cleopatra Records	–	–
Rise and Shine	2002	Captain Oi! Records	–	–
Rollercoaster	2004	SOS Records	–	–
Songs of Praise: 25th Anniversary Edition (Re-recording of Songs of Praise)	2008	People Like You Records	–	–
Life Goes On	2009	People Like You Records	–	–
All the Young Droogs	2012	DC-Jam Records	–	–
And It Was So!	2017	Nuclear Blast	–	–
Songs of Praise - 40th Anniversay	2024	Adicts Records	–	–

=== Live albums ===
Title	Release date	Record label
Live and Loud	1987	Link Records
Rockers into Orbit	1990	Fallout Records
Joker in the Pack	2004	Anagram Records

=== Compilation albums ===
Title	Release date	Record label	Peak position: UK Indie
This Is Your Life	1984	Fallout Records	12
Totally Adicted	1992	Dojo	
The Complete Adicts Singles Collection (Re-released as The Complete Singles Collection)	1994	Anagram Records	
The Best of The Adicts (Re-released by Anagram in 1998 as The Very Best of The Adicts)	1996	Dojo	
The Collection (Sound of Music and Smart Alex with bonus tracks)	1997	Taang! Records	
Ultimate Adiction - The Best Of	1997	Cleopatra Records	
Joker in the Pack	1999	Harry May Record Company	
Made in England	2005	SOS Records	
Clockwork Punks: The Collection	2005	Anarchy Music	
The Albums 1982-87 (boxed set consisting of Sound of Music, Smart Alex, Fifth Overture, Rarities, and Live and Loud!!)	2018	Captain Oi!, Cherry Red Records	

=== EPs ===
Title	Release date	Record label
Lunch with The Adicts	1979	Dining Out
Bar Room Bop	1985	Fallout Records
Triple B Sides	2008	People Like You Records

=== Singles ===
Title	Release date	Record label	Peak position: UK
"Viva la Revolution"	1982	Fallout Records	
"Chinese Takeaway"	1982	Razor Records	
"Bad Boy"	1983	Razor Records	75
"Tokyo" (as ADX)	1984	Sire Records	99
"Falling in Love Again" (as ADX)	1985	Sire Records	

=== Music videos ===
Title	Date
"Viva La Revolution"	1982
"Joker in the Pack"	1982
"Life Goes On"	2010
"Give It to Me Baby"	2013
"Picture the Scene"	2017
