= The Business (band) =

English punk band

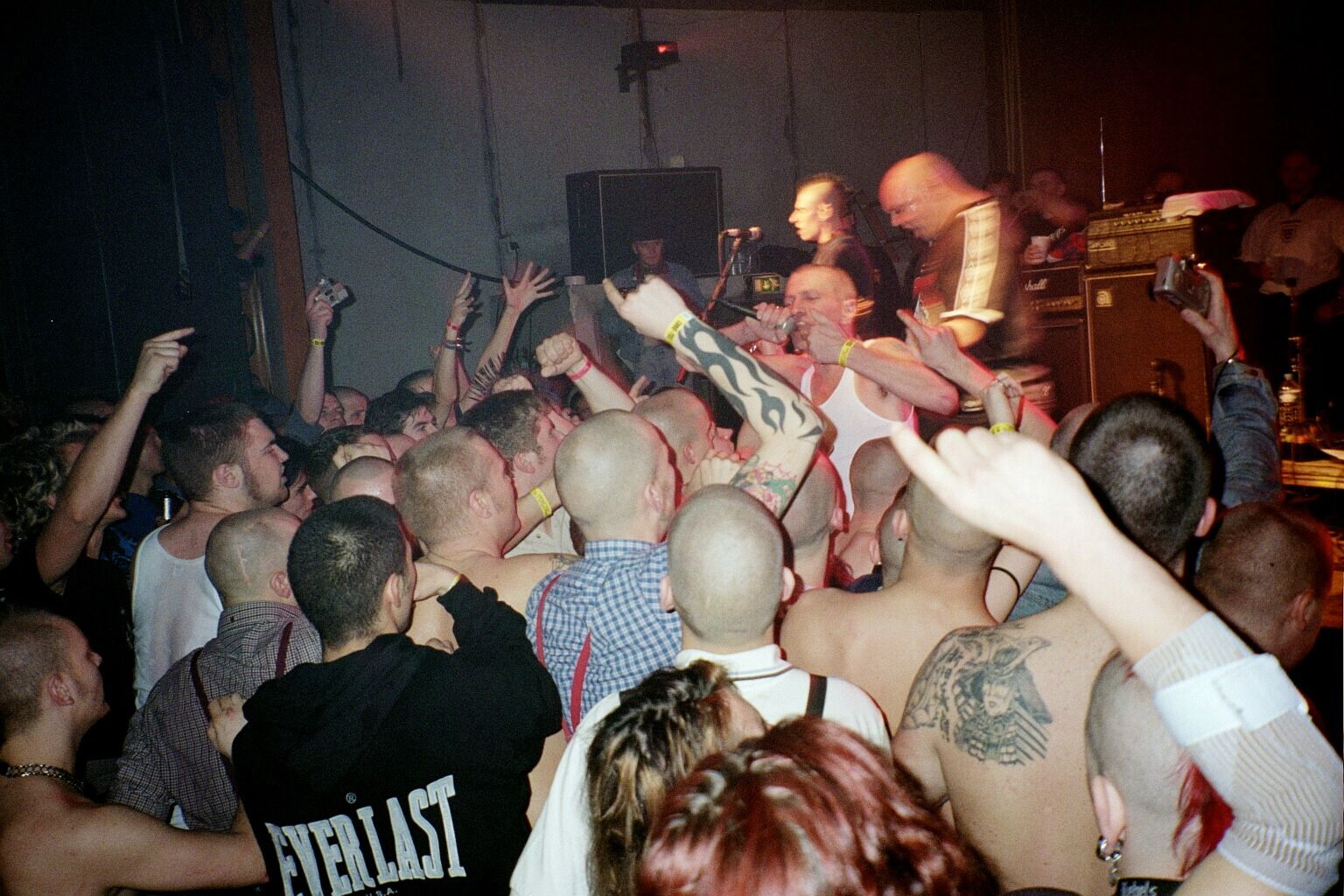

Background information
- Origin: Lewisham, South London, England
- Genres: Punk rock; oi!
- Years active: 1979–1988; 1992–2016
- Labels: Syndicate; Secret; Dojo; Link; Taang!; Epitaph; Captain Oi!; Bad Dog
- Past members: Micky Fitz; Steve Kent; Martin Smith; Nick Cunningham; Steve Whale; Mark Brennan; John Fisher; Micky Fairbairn; Lol Proctor; Graham Ball; Kev Boyce; Micky Fairbairn; Tosh; Fish; Trots; Chris Mundie; Nicky Baxter; Ray Bussey

The Business were an English punk band formed in 1979 in Lewisham, South London, England. The band lasted for four decades until their frontman Micky Fitz died from cancer in December 2016.

== History ==
The band was formed in 1979 by school friends Steve Kent (guitar), Michael Fitzsimons (known as "Micky Fitz") (vocals), Nick Cunningham (drums) and Martin Smith (bass). They played their first gig in front of friends in February 1980, and after taking on Lol Pryor as manager, began performing more often. The band's first release was the song "Out in the Cold" on the A Sudden Surge of Sound compilation album. They played their first Oi! concert in 1981, supporting The 4-Skins, and they became closely associated with the Oi! scene from then on. While the Oi! movement was labelled as far right and racist (despite the fact that several Oi! bands played at Rock Against Racism concerts), The Business took a stance against political extremism with their Oi Against Racism and Political Extremism ...But Still Against The System tour. Despite standing apart from the far-right, the band also criticized middle class leftists in songs like "Suburban Rebels."

In November 1981, they released their debut single, "Harry May", which spent over three months in the UK Indie Chart, reaching No. 13. The initial line-up split up in late 1981, with Kent, Cunningham, and Smith forming Q-Bow, but Fitz carried on with Pryor, recruiting Graham Ball on guitar, Mark Brennan and Steve Whale from The Blackout, and John Fisher on drums. The new line-up made their live debut in January 1982, after which Ball and Fisher departed, leaving the band as a four-piece, with Kev Boyce of The Blackout on drums. The new line-up recorded the Smash the Discos EP, which was a No. 3 indie hit, and after a short tour, they recorded their debut album, which was to be called Loud, Proud, and Punk. The master tapes for the album went missing after disagreements between the band's label and the studio, forcing them to re-record the album, which was released as Suburban Rebels in May 1983. The album was remixed by their label, Secret, without them knowing, and Secret's financial difficulties limited promotion of the album. Frustrated by this, the band split up, with The Business members forming short-lived bands Chapter and Sabre Dance.

Pryor issued a retrospective album consisting of demos and live tracks on his Syndicate label, the success of which prompted the band to reform and record a what was to be marketed as a live album, Loud, Proud, and Punk. It was recorded in a studio, with crowd noise dubbed in later. Pryor renamed his record label Wonderful World and issued several Business albums in late 1985, with the Drinking and Driving tour following. The name of the tour caused controversy, with tabloid journalists accusing the band of condoning drunk-driving, although the title was tongue-in-cheek.

In late 1986, Brennan and Pryor founded Link Records, and with Brennan becoming increasingly busy running the label, the band split up again. In 1992, Fitz performed a few songs guesting with The Elite and he reformed the band to play a benefit concert for Bobby Moore, who had recently died of cancer. Brennan later started a new record label, Captain Oi! Records and did not join the reformed band. The band's line-up then became Micky Fitz (singer), Steve Whale (guitar), Lol Proctor (bass) and Micky Fairbairn (drums). The band released a new single "Anywhere But Here" and new album Keep The Faith in 1994. After a number of tours in Western Europe, the band played their first gigs in America in August 1994. In 1997 The Business released The Truth, The Whole Truth and Nothing But The Truth which was produced by Lars Frederiksen from Rancid. In 2000, the band joined with Dropkick Murphys to release Mob Mentality. The band's final studio album, No Mercy For You was released in 2001. Their biggest hit song in recent times, "England 5 - Germany 1", (based on the result of a World Cup Qualifying match in 2001), became a football anthem for England and even appeared in the 2004 teen comedy EuroTrip. Despite various line-up changes, the band's popularity continued to grow.

By 2006 Fitz had rebuilt his band after overcoming his alcoholism, this year saw the band take on a 2-month tour of the US with the line-up of Fitz (singer), Robin Guy (drums), Daniel (guitar) and what would become long serving Trots (bass). In September 2006, Fitz recruited long time friend Tosh (of Section 5) to play guitar, shortly followed by Chris Mundie on drums. The band took to the studio in Berlin and recorded three covers, this session featured Mitch Harris of Napalm Death guesting to record the title track 'Mean Girl', originally by one of Fitz's favourite bands Status Quo. This was released by Bad Dog records as an EP, the B side being a live set recorded at the Marquee Club in London from 1982.

In April 2019, some of the classic line up (Steve Whale, Steve Kent and Micky Fairbairn) joined by JJ Pearce on bass (the Last Resort) performed at the Punk and Disorderly festival in Berlin. Roi Pearce (The Last Resort), Sebi (Stomper 98) and Mike Brands (Arch Rivals) appeared as guest singers. This marked the first time former members of The Business had performed without Micky Fitz playing The Business songs. The same line up, joined by Beki Bondage (Vice Squad) performed at Rebellion 2019. A toast was raised to Fitz's memory at both shows. Band manager, Lol Pryor, died in May 2022. On 10 May 2024, The Business performed again at the Punk and Disorderly Festival in Berlin, with Roi Pearce being one of the two singers.

On 6 August 2026, the band released their seventh studio album, The Business F.C.. It marked the band's first full-length studio album in twenty-five years and their first without Micky Fitz. The album features various guest singers including GBH's Colin Abrahall along with Rancid's Lars Frederiksen and Tim Armstrong.

== Death of Micky Fitz ==
In late 2015, Micky Fitz was diagnosed with cancer of the lymph gland and underwent radiotherapy. On 1 December 2016 it was announced that Fitz had died.

== Discography ==
Chart placings shown are from the UK Indie Chart.

=== Studio albums ===
Title	Year	Label
Suburban Rebels	1983	Secret Records
Saturday's Heroes	1985	Harry May
Welcome To The Real World	1988	Link
Keep The Faith	1994	Century Media
The Truth, The Whole Truth And Nothing But The Truth	1997	Taang! Records
No Mercy For You	2001	Burning Heart Records
The Business F.C.	2026	The Business Records

=== Singles/EPs ===
Title	Year	Label	Notes
"Harry May"	1981	Secret	Charted #13
Smash the Discos EP	1982	Secret	Charted #3
"Out of Business"	1983	Secret	(withdrawn)
"Get Out of My House"	1985	Wonderful World	
"Drinking and Driving"	1985	Diamond	Charted #27
"Do a Runner"	1988	Link	
"Anywhere But Here"	1994	Walzwerk	
"Death II Dance"	1996	Taang!	
"One Common Voice"	1997	Taang!	
"Hell 2 Pay"	2002	TKO Records	
Mean Girl EP	2008	Bad Dog	
Back In The Day EP	2014	Sailor's Grave	

=== Compilation and live albums ===
Title	Year	Label	Notes
1980-81 - Official Bootleg	1983	Syndicate	Charted #17
Loud, Proud & Punk - Live	1984	Syndicate	Charted #22
Back To Back	1985	Wonderful World	
Back To Back Volume 2	1985	Wonderful World	
Singalongabusiness	1986	Dojo Records	
Live & Loud	1989	Link	
In and Out of Business	1990	Link	(mail-order only, reissued on CD 1998 by Mog)
The Business 1979-1989	1991	Blackout Records	
The Best of The Business: 28 Classic Oi Anthems...	1992	Link	
The Complete Business Singles Collection	1995	Anagram	
Harry May - The Singles Collection	1996	Taang!	
Loud, Proud and Oi!	1996	Dojo Records	
The Business Live	1998	Pinhead Records	
Mob Mentality	2000	Taang!	(split with Dropkick Murphys)
Hardcore Hooligan	2003	Burning Heart	
Under The Influence	2003	Rhythm Vicar	
Doing The Business	2010	Sailor's Grave	
