= Oi! =

Subgenre of punk rock

- Other names: New punk (early); real punk (early)
- Stylistic origins: Punk rock; pub rock; drinking songs; football chants; folk music; ska; mod
- Cultural origins: Late 1970s – early 1980s, United Kingdom (particularly East London)
- Derivative forms: Tough guy hardcore; street punk; UK82

Subgenres
- Punk pathetique

Other topics
- Football hooliganism; Garry Bushell; hardcore punk; List of Oi! bands; mod revival; punk ideologies; skinhead; Sounds magazine; street punk; working class; new musick

Oi! (originally known as new punk or real punk) is a subgenre of punk rock that emerged in the United Kingdom, particularly in East London in the late 1970s and early 1980s. The style was coined by Sounds magazine writer Garry Bushell which stemmed from the garbled "Oi!" that Stinky Turner of the Cockney Rejects used to introduce the band's songs. The music and its associated subculture aimed to unite punks, skinheads, and generally disaffected working-class youth.

The movement was partly a response to the perception that many participants in the early UK punk scene were, according to guitarist Steve Kent of The Business, "trendy university people using long words, trying to be artistic... and losing touch." The movement was later associated with racism and violence due to far-right infiltration. The compilation album Strength Thru Oi! (1981) sparked controversy as it featured neo-nazi Nicky Crane and referenced a Nazi slogan. Oi! later gave way to other styles such as street punk and UK82.

Notable acts included Sham 69, Cock Sparrer, Angelic Upstarts, Cockney Rejects, the 4-Skins, the Business, Anti-Establishment, Blitz, the Blood and Combat 84.

== History ==
During the late 1970s, Oi! was originally referred to as "new punk", the term was coined by Sounds magazine writer Garry Bushell who published the article "Cockney Rejects and the Rise of New Punk" on 4 August 1979. The style would also be referred to as "real punk". He later labelled the style Oi! which stemmed from the garbled "Oi!" that Stinky Turner of the Cockney Rejects used to introduce the band's songs. The word is a British expression meaning Hey!. The movement emerged after the perceived commercialisation of punk rock and new wave.

In 1978, Bushell argued "New Punk" artists such as the Angelic Upstarts had more relevance than "New Musick". Bushell would be an early supporter of Oi! as a reaction to the artistic intellectualization of punk found in post-punk, art punk or new musick, with "new punk" followers expressing appreciation for his support of "real kids" bands and his refusal to be an "intellectual snob". First-generation Oi! bands such as Sham 69 and Cock Sparrer were around for years before the word Oi! was used retroactively to describe their style of music. In addition to the Cockney Rejects, other bands to be explicitly labeled Oi! in the early days of the genre included the 4-Skins, the Business, Anti-Establishment, Blitz, the Blood and Combat 84.

Although Oi! has come to be considered mainly a conservative or skinhead-oriented genre associated with racism and violence due to far-right infiltration, the movement initially emerged purely as a reaction to the early UK punk scene's focus on intellectualism and aimed to bring together disenfranchised working-class youth. The prevalent ideology of the original Oi! movement was a rough brand of working-class rebellion. Lyrical topics included unemployment, workers' rights, harassment by police and other authorities, and oppression by the government. Oi! songs also covered less-political topics such as street violence, football, sex, and alcohol.

Some Oi! bands―such as Sam McCrory and Johnny Adair's Offensive Weapon―and fans were involved in white nationalist organisations such as the National Front (NF) and the British Movement (BM), leading some critics to dismiss the Oi! subgenre as racist. Other Oi! bands, such as Angelic Upstarts, The Business, The Burial and The Oppressed, were associated with left-wing politics and anti-racism, and others were non-political.

Rock Against Communism (RAC) was a partial development from white power/white supremacist movements, which had musical and aesthetic similarities to Oi! Although due to Cold War fears the genre had appealed to some punk rock bands distinct from original Oi! in that they opposed all totalitarianism, it was not connected to the Oi! scene. Timothy S. Brown writes:

[Oi!] played an important symbolic role in the politicization of the skinhead subculture. By providing, for the first time, a musical focus for skinhead identity that was "white"—that is, that had nothing to do with the West Indian immigrant presence and little obvious connection with black musical roots—Oi! provided a musical focus for new visions of skinhead identity [and] a point of entry for a new brand of right-wing rock music.

Garry Bushell, the journalist who promoted the Oi! genre, argued that the white power music scene was "totally distinct from us. We had no overlap other than a mutual dislike of each other".

The mainstream media increased its claims that Oi! was linked to far-right racist politics after an Oi! concert at the Hambrough Tavern in Southall on 4 July 1981 ended with five hours of rioting, 120 people being injured and the tavern being burnt down. Before the concert, some audience members had written NF slogans around the area and bullied Asian residents of the neighbourhood.

In response, local Asian youths threw Molotov cocktails and other objects at the tavern, mistakenly believing that the concert—featuring the Business, the 4-Skins and the Last Resort—was a neo-Nazi event. Although some of the concert-goers were National Front or British Movement supporters, none of the performers were white power music bands, and the audience of approximately 500 people included skinheads, black skinheads, punk rockers, rockabillies, and non-affiliated youths.

In the aftermath of that riot, many Oi! bands condemned racism and fascism. These denials were met with cynicism from some quarters because of the Strength Thru Oi! compilation album, released in May 1981. Not only was its title a play on a Nazi slogan "Strength Through Joy", but the cover featured Nicky Crane, a skinhead BM activist who was serving a four-year sentence for racist violence. Crane later disavowed his alignment with the far right after revealing he was gay.

Bushell, who compiled the album, stated its title was a pun on the Skids' album Strength Through Joy, and that he had been unaware of the Nazi connotations. He denied knowing the identity of the skinhead on the album's cover until it was exposed by the Daily Mail two months after the release. Bushell, a socialist at the time, noted the irony of being branded a far-right activist by a newspaper that "had once supported Oswald Mosley's Blackshirts, Mussolini's invasion of Abyssinia, and appeasement with Hitler right up to the outbreak of World War Two."

After the Oi! movement lost momentum in the United Kingdom, Oi! scenes formed in continental Europe, North America, and Asia. Soon, especially in the United States, the Oi! phenomenon mirrored the hardcore punk scene of the late 1970s, with American Oi!-originating bands such as the Radicals, U.S. Chaos, Iron Cross, Agnostic Front, and Anti Heros. Later American punk bands such as Rancid and Dropkick Murphys have credited Oi! as a source of inspiration.

In the mid-1990s, there was a revival of interest in Oi! music, leading to older Oi! bands receiving more recognition in the UK and bands such as The Business being discovered by young, multiracial skinheads in the US. In the 2000s, many of the original UK Oi! bands reunited to perform and/or record.

== See also ==
- Street punk
- Lad culture

== Bibliography ==
- Wilkinson, David (2016). Post-Punk, Politics and Pleasure in Britain (PDF). Springer. ISBN 978-1-137-49780-2.
- Cateforis, Theodore (15 June 2011). Are We Not New Wave?: Modern Pop at the Turn of the 1980s (Illustrated ed.). Ann Arbor: University of Michigan Press. ISBN 978-0-472-03470-3.
- Haddon, Mimi (2023). What Is Post-Punk?: Genre and Identity in Avant-Garde Popular Music, 1977–82. University of Michigan Press. ISBN 978-0-472-03921-0. Archived from the original on 13 November 2025.
- Worley, Matthew (2024). Zerox Machine: Punk, Post-Punk and Fanzines in Britain, 1976–88. Reaktion Books. ISBN 978-1789148596.
