= The Society of the Spectacle (film) =

1974 film by Guy Debord

La Société du Spectacle
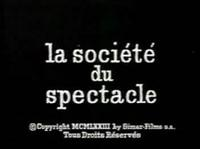
- Directed by: Guy Debord
- Written by: Guy Debord
- Narrated by: Guy Debord
- Music by: Michel Corrette
- Release date: May 1, 1974
- Running time: 88 min.
- Country: France
- Language: French

La Société du Spectacle (English: Society of the Spectacle) is a black-and-white 1974 film by the Situationist Guy Debord, based on his 1967 book of the same name. It was Debord's first feature-length film. It uses found footage and détournement in a radical Marxist critique of mass marketing and its role in the alienation of modern society.

== Film content ==
The 88 minute film took a year to make and incorporates an apparent jumble of footage from feature films juxtaposed with still photographs, industrial films, early 1970s glossy 'lifestyle' TV ads, and news footage of unrest in the streets. The feature films include The Battleship Potemkin, October, Chapaev, The New Babylon, The Shanghai Gesture, For Whom the Bell Tolls, Rio Grande, They Died with Their Boots On, Johnny Guitar, and Mr. Arkadin, as well as other Soviet films.

Throughout the film, there are intertitles consisting of quotations from The Society of the Spectacle, along with Debord (in voice-over) reading texts from Marx, Machiavelli, the 1968 Occupation Committee of the Sorbonne, Tocqueville, Émile Pouget, and Sergey Solovyov and others. Without citations, these quotes are hard to decipher, especially with the conflicting subtitles (which exist even in the French version): but that is part of Debord's goal to "problematize reception" (Greil and Sanborn) and force the viewer to be active. In addition, the words of some of the authors are détourned through deliberate misquoting.

Footage of historical events is included, such as the murder of Lee Harvey Oswald (the alleged assassin of U.S. President John F. Kennedy in 1963), the Spanish Civil War of 1936-1939, the 1956 Hungarian Revolution and the Paris riots in May 1968, along with clips of people such as Mao Zedong, Fidel Castro, Richard Nixon and the Spanish anarchist Buenaventura Durruti.

In 1984, Debord withdrew his films from circulation because of the negative press and the assassination of his friend and patron Gerard Lebovici. Since Debord's suicide in 1994, Debord's wife Alice Becker-Ho has been promoting Debord's film. A DVD box set titled Guy Debord: Oeuvres cinématographiques complètes was released in 2005 and contains Debord's seven films.

== Music ==
The piece used in the film is Les Délices de la Solitude, Op. 20 No. 6 - Sonata in D Major : I. Allegro Moderato, by Michel Corrette.

== Sources ==
- Marcus, Greil and Sanborn, "On the films of Guy Debord", Keith; Feature; Artforum; February 2006
- Bracken, Len; Guy Debord: Revolutionary; Feral House; 1997; California
- Knabb, Ken; Guy Debord's Complete Cinematic Works; AK Press; 1978; Canada
- Marshall, Peter; Demanding the Impossible: A History of Anarchism; Fontana Press; 1992; London
- Lasn, Kalle; Culture Jam: How to Reverse America's Suicidal Consumer Binge - And Why We Must; Quill; 1999; New York
