= Djambi =

Board game

Djambi (also described as "Machiavelli's chessboard") is a board game and a chess variant for four players, invented by Jean Anesto in 1975. The rulebook in French describes the game, the pieces and the rules in a humorous and theatrical way, clearly stating that the game pieces are intended to represent all wrongdoings in politics.

== Rules ==
=== Material ===
	A	B	C	D	E	F	G	H	I
1									
2									
3									
4									
5									
6									
7									
8									
9									
Board of Djambi, with the pieces in their start position. Each piece is identified by the first letter of its name as well as a symbol. The E5 square, at the exact center of this 9×9 board, is called "the maze" and has special rules concerning it.

The game is played on a square board with 81 cells in a 9×9 arrangement. The central square (called "the maze") is marked with a different color or a sign. When a corpse is returned to the board, players generally are restricted from returning the corpse to the maze, with one exception.

Each player has nine pieces:

Djambi pieces
Qty	Name	Type	Description
1	Chief	Killer	Special rules apply when the chief occupies the "maze" (E5)
1	Assassin	Killer	Kills by moving into an occupied cell
1	Reporter	Killer	Kills by moving into a cell adjacent to an occupied cell
4	Militant	Killer	Limited to moving one or two spaces at a time.
1	Diplomat	Mover	Moves living pieces. It is a very useful piece at the beginning of the game also called Agitator, or Troublemaker.
1	Necromobile	Mover	Moves corpses. Important piece in end of game as dead pieces stay as corpses on the board in this game.

=== Objective ===
The objective of the game is to get absolute power by being the last chief alive on board. Although informal alliances can be temporarily agreed upon, there is no team: each player plays against the other players.

=== Starting position ===
Each player's pieces are placed in one corner of the board as shown in the picture above. The red player starts first, and turns proceed through the blue, yellow, and green players.

=== Movements ===
Militant and regular piece move

Each player, during their turn, moves one of their pieces; each piece can move in a straight line in one of eight directions along a row, column, or diagonal, identical to how a queen moves in chess. The militants move one or two squares in the eight directions; the other pieces can move through any number of squares in the eight directions. However, no piece can pass through a cell that is already occupied.

If the maze is unoccupied, all pieces may pass through the maze without stopping; only a chief is allowed to stop in the maze. When the maze is occupied by a chief, a militant may not enter (i.e., capture) that chief, but any of the other pieces may enter the maze to kill or move the chief in power.

A move may result in capturing an opponent's piece, depending on the piece being moved and where it ends its move relative to that opposing piece.

=== Captures ===
The pieces are "killed" as soon as they are captured, but their "corpses" are not removed from the board; instead, the corpses are returned to the board turned upside down to show that they are "dead". Each of the killer pieces has a different capture style:

Djambi killer capture styles
Piece	Style	Corpse placement	Example	Description
Militant	Capture by replacement	Any unoccupied square		The militant kills when their move ends by occupying the square of an opposing piece. They place the corpse on an unoccupied square of their choice, except on the central square (the "maze"). A militant cannot kill a chief that occupies the maze; a chief in the maze is said to be "in power".
Chief	Capture by replacement	Any unoccupied square	Shows a move where chief piece kills and places corpses to protect themselves against further moves	The chief kills and places the corpse in the same way as the militant. In the illustrated example, the red chief at A9 either (1) moves to kill the green chief at E5, placing the corpse at F6, or (2) moves to kill the blue chief at I9, placing the corpse at I8. In both cases, the corpse is placed to block the yellow chief from killing the red chief. However, in case (1), the red chief at E5 is now vulnerable to the blue chief at I9, and in case (2), the red chief at I9 is vulnerable to the green chief at E5.
Assassin	Capture by replacement	In originating square	Forced placement of corpse when assassin kills.	The assassin kills in the same way as the militant, but places the corpse in the square they come from. This is the symbol that corpses by assassin tend to mess space at home in politics.
Reporter	From adjacent square	Remains in square	Reporter may kill one of orthogonal pieces at arrival. They may also move without killing.	The reporter may kill the occupant of one of the four squares that share a side with the square to which they have moved (they cannot kill diagonally). The corpse stays in their square. The reporter can only kill at the end of their move. That means that if they are moved by the diplomat, they must move again before killing and so cannot kill a piece that is directly orthogonal to them at the beginning of their move. The reporter can move without killing. In this example, the red reporter at C7 moves to the empty square at H2, where they can kill one of the pieces in the four adjacent squares sharing a side: H1, G2, I2, or H3.

The diplomat and the necromobile cannot kill the other pieces but can move them.

Djambi mover pieces
Piece	Style	Example	Description
Diplomat	By replacement	Advantageous positioning of living pieces of adversary.	The diplomat can move another living piece by occupying its square; of course, they are limited to move only the pieces of the other players. The moved piece is placed on any unoccupied square, except the maze, if this piece is not a chief. In this example, the blue diplomat at B8 moves onto the yellow assassin at F8, moving it to H2. Since yellow has the next turn, the yellow assassin now can take the green chief at I1.
Necromobile	By replacement	Protecting your pieces by moving corpses.	The necromobile moves dead pieces similar to how the diplomat moves living pieces, whatever the origin of the dead piece is. The corpses cannot be placed in the maze. In the illustrated example, the red necromobile at C7 moves onto the corpse at C3 and moves it to G9, blocking the threat from the blue assassin at H9, which would otherwise be able to take the red chief at A9.

=== Death and surrounding of a chief ===
Chief dies if completely surrounded and has no necromobile. Their pieces will become minions of chief in the maze or the first chief that enter the maze.

When a player kills an opponent's chief, they take control of the remaining living pieces of that opponent. At their turn, they will have the choice between using one of their own pieces, or using one of the captured pieces.

When a player has no necromobile and their chief is surrounded by corpses, they are eliminated unless they are in power, i.e., in the maze. The remaining living pieces of the surrounded chief now belong to the chief in power. If there is no chief in power, then those pieces cannot be moved or killed, until the moment when a chief takes the power, and captures them in that way. The first chief to seize power by entering the maze keep controls of these pieces even after they leave the maze.

=== The maze ===
The central square of the board (E5) is called the maze. Each piece can go through this square, but the chief is the only piece that can stop on it. A chief who is in the maze is a chief "in power". When they leave the maze, they lose this power. There are four key advantages of holding the maze:

1. The player whose chief is in power takes another turn after each other player's turn. For instance, if there are four players, they play three times in a turn. If there are two players, they play twice consecutively.
2. A chief in power takes control of the pieces of the surrounded chiefs, and keeps them after losing the power.
3. A chief in power cannot be killed by a militant. However, the other killer pieces (Assassin, Reporter, Chief) may kill a chief in power.
4. A chief in power cannot be eliminated through surrounding as long as they stay on the maze.

=== Killing a chief in power ===
How to make the extra move when killing in the maze

An assassin or a chief can enter the maze to kill a living chief. When a chief kills another chief in power, the corpse is returned to the board to any empty square at the killing chief's discretion, and the killing chief has ascended to power. If an assassin kills a chief, the following sequence is followed within a single turn:

1. The assassin enters the maze and the corpse of the chief is removed from the board. In the illustrated example, the yellow assassin moves from H8 to E5, entering the maze to kill the green chief.
2. The assassin exits the maze as a mandatory additional move. In the example, the free exit move results in the yellow assassin moving from E5 to I9.
3. The chief's corpse is returned to the board at the assassin's origin, in accordance with the style of the assassin. In this example, the corpse is placed in the assassin's origin (H8), which also serves to protect the yellow assassin from the red chief at B2.

If the reporter kills a chief in power, the chief's corpse remains in the maze, blocking any other chief from entering the maze until a player moves their necromobile (if one is available) to enter the maze and move the corpse. Similar to the situation when an assassin enters the maze to kill a chief, the necromobile must make an additional move to exit the maze on the same turn.

Similarly, a diplomat may enter the maze to displace a living chief in power, and is required to take an additional move to exit the maze on the same turn after the chief is moved.

The original rules humorously state these additional exit moves are mandatory to avoid a "precarious" situation that would leave an assassin empowered in the maze.

=== Alliances and betrayals ===
There can be informal agreements or alliances between the players, but there is no rule to prevent any betrayal.

=== End of the game ===
The game ends when only one chief remains.

== Variants ==
=== Three-player variant ===
The pieces of the missing fourth player are "hostages". These pieces can be killed or moved by the pieces of the players, but cannot move or kill on their own. When the chief is captured, the normal rules to take control of them apply. The hostage chief can be placed in the maze, but it has no influence on the game.

== Influence ==
Guy Debord was gifted a Djambi set in the 1970s by Gérard Lebovici, but found it unrealistic and developed A Game of War, publishing it in 1978.
