= Mesrine (1984 film) =

- Theatrical poster
- Directed by: André Génovès
- Written by: André Génovès
- Produced by: Gérard Croce
- Starring: Nicolas Silberg; Caroline Aguilar; Gérard Sergue
- Cinematography: Jean-Claude Couty
- Edited by: Martine Rousseau
- Music by: Jean-Pierre Rusconi
- Production company: G.R. Productions
- Distributed by: Parafrance Films
- Release date: 29 February 1984
- Running time: 110 min.
- Country: France
- Language: French

Mesrine is a 1984 French film written and directed by André Génovès. A biographical film based on the life of Jacques Mesrine, it focuses on the eighteen months following his escape from La Santé Prison in May 1978 until his death in November 1979. Nicolas Silberg stars as the eponymous lead character.

== Cast ==
- Nicolas Silberg as Jacques Mesrine
- Caroline Aguilar as Sylvia Jeanjacquot
- Gérard Sergue as François Besse
- Michel Poujade as Le commissaire Broussard
- Louis Arbessier as Lelievre
- Claude Faraldo as Charlie Bauer
- Jean-Pierre Pauty as Tillier
- Artus de Penguern as Inspector Lejeune

== Reception ==
Film critic James Benefield of Little White Lies magazine regarded Mesrine as "a pretty ropey, half-baked biopic", inferior to the later 2008 film starring Vincent Cassel. Benefield criticized Génovès' "bland direction" and "lack of imagination", likening the film to a television production rather than a cinematic release, and noted that "the film fails to come to terms with Mesrine’s controversial glamour and celebrity". The Blood wrote a song about Mesrine which preceded both the 1984, and 2008 movies. The song featured on the 1983 album False Gestures For A Devious Public.
