= Jacques Mesrine =

French criminal (1936–1979)

- Booking photo of Mesrine, taken in 1973
- Born: Jacques René Mesrine; 28 December 1936; Clichy, France
- Died: 2 November 1979 (aged 42); Paris, France
- Cause of death: Gunshot wounds
- Other names: French Robin Hood; The Man of a Thousand Faces
- Spouse(s): Lydia De Souza (divorced); María de la Soledad (divorced)
- Children: 3
- Criminal charges: Assassination, bank robbery, burglary, kidnapping
- Penalty: 20 years

Jacques Mesrine (French pronunciation: [ʒak mɛʁin, mɛsʁin]; (Note: Mesrine pronounced his name [mɛʁin], but the French media popularized the pronunciation with [s], [mɛsʁin].) 28 December 1936 – 2 November 1979) was a French criminal responsible for numerous murders, bank robberies, burglaries, and kidnappings in France, the US, and Canada. Mesrine repeatedly escaped from prison and made international headlines during a final period as a fugitive when his exploits included trying to kidnap the judge who had previously sentenced him. An aptitude for disguise earned him the moniker "The Man of a Thousand Faces" and enabled him to remain at large while receiving massive publicity as a wanted man. Mesrine was widely seen as an anti-establishment Robin Hood figure. In keeping with his charismatic image, he was rarely without a female companion. A two-part film, Mesrine, which came out in 2008, was based on Mesrine's life.

== Early life and criminal career up to 1965 ==
Jacques René Mesrine was born in Clichy, near Paris on 28 December 1936 to a couple of blue-collar origin who had moved up in social class. As a child, he witnessed a massacre of villagers by German soldiers. His parents had great aspirations for their son and sent him to the prestigious Catholic Collège de Juilly where his friends included the likes of musician and composer Jean-Jacques Debout. Mesrine was an extremely unruly pupil and he was expelled from Juilly for attacking the principal. He went on to be expelled from other schools and fell into the lifestyle of a juvenile delinquent, much to the dismay of his family. In 1955, at age 19, he married Lydia De Souza in Clichy; the couple divorced a year later. Drafted into the French Army, he volunteered for special duty in the Algerian War as a parachutist/commando. While participating in counter-insurgency operations, Mesrine's duties are said to have included the killing of prisoners. Although he disliked military discipline, Mesrine enjoyed action and was decorated with the Cross for Military Valour by General Charles de Gaulle before leaving the army in 1959. His father was later to claim that the time in Algeria had brought about a noticeable deterioration in Mesrine's behaviour.

In 1961, Mesrine became involved with the Organisation armée secrète. He married Maria de la Soledad; they had three children but later separated in 1965. In 1962, Mesrine was sentenced to 18 months in prison for robbery (his first prison sentence, although he had been a professional criminal for a number of years). After being released, Mesrine made an effort to reform: he worked at an architectural design company where he constructed models, showing considerable ability. However, a downsizing in 1964 resulted in his being laid off. His family bought him the tenancy of a country restaurant, a role in which he was quite successful, but this arrangement ended after the owner paid a visit one evening to find Mesrine carousing with acquaintances from his past. The lure of easy money and women proved impossible for him to resist and he returned to crime. Overcoming some suspicion about his relatively middle-class background, Mesrine began to establish a reputation in the underworld as a man who was crossed at one's peril.

In December 1965, Mesrine was arrested in the villa of the military governor in Palma de Mallorca. He was sentenced to six months in jail and later claimed that Spanish authorities believed he was working for French intelligence.

== Canary Islands, Canada, Venezuela, 1966–1972 ==
In 1966, Mesrine opened a restaurant in the Canary Islands. In December of the same year, he robbed a jewellery store in Geneva and a hotel in Chamonix. The following year, Mesrine robbed a fashion store in Paris.

In February 1968, he fled to Quebec with his then mistress, Jeanne Schneider, and worked as a housekeeper/cook and a chauffeur for grocery and textile millionaire Georges Deslauriers for a few months. An argument Schneider had with Deslauriers' long-time respected gardener led to both being dismissed. They then attempted to kidnap Deslauriers, but this scheme failed when a supposedly strong sedative had no effect on Deslauriers.

On 26 June 1969, Mesrine and Schneider fled to the US. On 30 June, Evelyne Le Bouthillier, an elderly lady who may have given them refuge, was found strangled. A couple of weeks later, on 16 July, Mesrine and Schneider were arrested in Texarkana, Arkansas on information supplied by an accomplice and extradited to Quebec.

Mesrine was sentenced to 10 years in prison for the bungled kidnapping; he escaped a few weeks later, but was rearrested the next day. Mesrine and Schneider were acquitted of the murder of Le Bouthillier in 1971. With Jean-Paul Mercier, Mesrine cut through the wire to escape again on 21 August 1972 with five others from the Saint-Vincent-de-Paul prison. Mercier, a wanted murderer, and Mesrine then robbed a series of banks in Montreal, sometimes two in the same day. By this time it was apparent that Mesrine did not have a typical criminal attitude towards minimizing the danger of being caught. Deeply resenting the way he had been treated in the prison, Mesrine and Mercier made an extremely risky attempt to precipitate a mass break out from the maximum security block of Saint-Vincent-de-Paul on 3 September 1972. However, their own break-out had caused perimeter security to be greatly increased and they found the area swarming with armed guards. There was a shoot-out in which two guards were seriously injured and Mercier was wounded before they managed to get away. The boldness of escaped convicts returning to attack a prison infuriated Canadian law enforcement; the escapade predictably led to a hugely increased effort to arrest the duo.

=== Murder of Médéric Cote and Ernest Saint-Pierre ===
A week after their foiled attempt to free the prisoners, Mesrine and Mercier went for a target practice session, taking Mercier's girlfriend along. But the location, though three miles down a dirt track through the forest, was far from being truly remote and the noise of them blasting away at targets all afternoon could be heard in the town of Plessisville where there was a Ministry of Natural Resources and Wildlife station. When Mesrine and company drove back along the track, two forest rangers, Médéric Cote, aged 62, and Ernest Saint-Pierre, aged 50, were waiting. The rangers were armed but their jobs had mainly involved enforcing hunting and firearms regulations, and in any case, there was no reason for them to expect that the men who had been making themselves conspicuous by such a disturbance would actually be wanted escapees. Realising they were not policemen, Mesrine submitted to a search of the car, but on finding loaded guns in the rear, the rangers informed them that they would have to follow their car back to Plessisville. While Mesrine was trying to talk them out of this, Cote, possibly alerted by the sight of the arsenal of weapons, suddenly recognised the pair, whereupon Mesrine and Mercier shot both officers dead.

Mesrine continued robbing banks in Montreal, and even covertly gained access into the US again for a brief stay at the Waldorf Astoria Hotel in New York City, before moving to Caracas, Venezuela.

== Return to France: 1972–1977 ==
By the end of 1972, Mesrine had returned to France, where he resumed robbing banks. On 5 March 1973, during an argument with a cashier in a coffee bar, Mesrine brandished a revolver and seriously injured a police officer who tried to intervene. He was arrested 3 days later. In May, he was sentenced to 20 years imprisonment – which, considering his record, was lenient for the time and place – to be served at La Santé maximum security prison where escape was thought to be impossible. In a plan likely formulated even before his arrest, Mesrine took a judge, who sentenced him on another matter in the past, hostage with a revolver (recovered from the courthouse lavatory where it had been hidden by an accomplice) and escaped. After being at large for four months, he was arrested in his new Paris apartment on 28 September 1973, on information supplied by an associate who wanted a reduced sentence. Mesrine was returned to La Santé where he covertly wrote and smuggled out an autobiography, titled L'Instinct de Mort ("Death Instinct"), in which he claimed to have committed upwards of forty murders, a number thought by some to be a considerable exaggeration. The appearance of Mesrine's book resulted in France passing a "Son of Sam law", designed to stop criminals profiting from the publication of their crimes.

== Escape from La Santé ==
La Santé was seen as an escape-proof prison. In his escapes from his Canadian prisons, Mesrine had required little more than wire cutters and a very high degree of audacity. During this incarceration, however, he faced security far better than any he had defeated before. A report noted that Mesrine had been seen doing exercises in his cell and was behaving like a man who had received good news. On 8 May 1978, he produced a gun, stole keys and, with François Besse (a highly accomplished escaper in his own right), and another man, Mesrine got out of a cellblock and into a fenced-off yard walkway. They had a grappling iron with them and Mesrine forced some workmen with an extending ladder to bring the ladder along. The trio unlocked a yard gate in an inner wall; an armed guard was taken by surprise at his post. The men then reached an isolated part of the 14 metre (46 ft) high exterior wall (which would have presented a considerable challenge without the ladder). They hooked the grappling iron onto the top of the ladder, scaled the wall, and slid down a rope. The third man over the wall was shot dead by police in the street outside. Mesrine and Besse hijacked a car and evaded a police cordon; they had become the first men to escape from La Santé.

=== Mesrine as fugitive ===
Mesrine and Besse robbed a Paris gunsmith four days after their escape from La Santé. On 26 May 1978, the duo robbed the Deauville Casino of 130,000 francs, but the police arrived as they exited. Around 50 shots were exchanged and Mesrine was wounded, but the duo made a getaway. Mesrine and Besse eluded the subsequent massive sweep of the area by taking a farmer and his family hostage and forcing him to drive them to safety. Subsequently, the kidnapping of a banker netted them 450,000 francs in ransom. Despite his position as "French public enemy number one" (l'ennemi public numéro un), Mesrine was featured on the cover of the 4 August 1978 Paris Match. In an interview inside, he threatened the Minister of Justice. By remaining at large in the Paris area, despite his notoriety, Mesrine appeared to be making a fool of the law and the state; the Paris Match interview was the last straw. The police agencies hunting Mesrine were pressured for results from the highest echelons of government.

This proved to be difficult, not the least because of rivalry between the various agencies. The usual informants were of little use as Mesrine generally avoided contact with the criminal underworld. Moreover, he was adept at disguising his appearance and allaying suspicion from members of the public: he reportedly went for a drink with his neighbours and laughed when one said he "looked like Mesrine". Mesrine travelled to Sicily, Algeria, London, and Brussels, and back to Paris in November 1978, where he again robbed a bank. Objecting to Mesrine's proposed kidnapping of a senior judge, and not sharing his desire for revenge against the system, François Besse disassociated with Mesrine and later disappeared. Besse was finally captured in 1994; he was paroled in 2006.

== Public Enemy No. 1 ==
Mesrine's next exploit occurred in November 1978. It was a daring attempt to kidnap a judge (who had sentenced him) as part of a campaign to get maximum security prisons closed. His accomplice was captured but Mesrine escaped by running downstairs past several policemen telling them "Quick! Mesrine's up there!" A young policeman posted outside was found handcuffed to a drainpipe weeping. On 21 June 1979, Mesrine kidnapped millionaire real estate mogul Henri Lelièvre and received a ransom of six million francs.

Mesrine made good copy for the press, clowning for the camera and asserting that his criminal activity was politically motivated.

Jacques Tillier (a former Directorate of Territorial Security policeman) had written disparagingly about Mesrine in the French far-right newspaper Minute but on 10 September 1979, he went, rather incautiously, to a clandestine meeting with Mesrine on the promise of an interview. The incensed Mesrine had other plans: he shot Tillier in the face, leg and arm. Tillier survived the ordeal, although he lost the use of one arm. During his contact with Mesrine, Tillier discovered the identity of Mesrine's accomplice.

== Death ==
The special gendarme unit tasked with finding and capturing Mesrine found it impossible to track him down directly. Eventually, by using information supplied by Tillier, they ascertained the licence number of the car that a woman named Sylvia Jeanjacquot, believed to be Mesrine's mistress, had used and checked parking tickets which it had received months previously. These tickets indicated that she had been frequenting a certain district without any obvious cause. Undercover patrols combed the area and a man fitting Mesrine's description was spotted walking with a woman believed to be Jeanjacquot on 31 October 1979. One officer who had seen Mesrine at court confirmed the identification by noting Mesrine's distinctive build. The couple were followed home and their building watched around the clock.

Two days later, on 2 November 1979, the couple left the apartment for a weekend in the country, taking Jeanjacquot's pet poodle with them. Mesrine and Jeanjacquot had reached Porte de Clignancourt on the outskirts of Paris, when the gold BMW 520 they were driving was boxed in at the entrance to a junction. Police marksmen in the rear of a lorry immediately in front of their car threw open a tarpaulin. Reportedly, in the instant before the gendarmerie opened fire, Mesrine's eyes were described as being so shocked they seemed to be bursting from his head, as he realised he was trapped. Twenty rounds were fired at point-blank range and Mesrine was shot 15 times. A coup de grâce was then administered with a pistol. Sylvia Jeanjacquot lost one eye and suffered lasting damage to her arm. Her pet dog was killed.

=== Legal proceedings ===
French police announced that their operation was a success and received congratulations from then President Valéry Giscard d'Estaing. There were suggestions in media publications that Mesrine may have been shot without warning in a way which amounted to extrajudicial killing. The police replied that Mesrine had sworn that he would never surrender and that, as well as having a gun on him, Mesrine had been armed with two grenades which were taped together and adapted so they could be brought into action instantly.

In an interview with French TV in 2001, police commissioner Robert Broussard maintained that the police had given Mesrine a chance to surrender. Eyewitnesses and other accounts disputed Broussard, stating that the surrender order came after the gunfire or the standard warnings.

Sylvia Jeanjacquot underwent multiple operations and served more than two years in prison before being ultimately acquitted of any crime.

Mesrine's former defence lawyer, Maître Malinbaum, continued for 30 years to fight for a judicial investigation into the events surrounding Mesrine's death at Porte de Clignancourt and to have the French state held accountable for what she saw as the assassination of her client. The case was reopened in March 2000, but was dismissed. In October 2006, the Court of Cassation declared the Mesrine family's appeal inadmissibile.

== Murder of Gérard Lebovici ==
By law, Mesrine could not profit from L'instinct de Mort, but the publishers had received a threatening letter from him in 1979 demanding payment nonetheless. L'instinct de Mort was republished in 1984 by Champ Libre Editions, The founder of Champ Libre, Gérard Lebovici, was a gifted entrepreneur, influential in the French film industry, and known for his fascination with criminals. Lebovici adopted Mesrine's daughter after her father's death.

On 7 March 1984, the body of Gérard Lebovici was found in the Avenue Foch underground car park. It was determined that he had been shot dead two days earlier, with the bullet wounds forming a square: a traditional underworld sign for a contract that has not been fulfilled. One theory is that Lebovici may have been killed by a close associate of Mesrine's with whom Lebovici may have had an appointment on the day of his death.

== Pop culture references ==
The 1979 film The Police War (La Guerre des polices), released a few days after Mesrine's death, was based on the real-life competition between French police divisions to capture Mesrine. In the 1980 comedy film Inspector Blunder (Inspecteur la Bavure) Gérard Depardieu plays a character based on Mesrine. The 1984 film Mesrine, starring Nicolas Silberg in the title role, recounts the final months of Mesrine's career.

Hard rock ensemble Trust dedicated two tracks ("Le Mitard" and "Instinct de Mort") to Mesrine on their 1980 album Repression.

Punk group The Blood recorded a track titled "Mesrine" on their 1983 False Gestures For A Devious Public LP. There is also a Quebec-based grindcore band named Mesrine.

In the 1998 French novel Blood Red Rivers (Les Rivières Pourpres), it is mentioned that the protagonist, Detective Superintendent Niemans, was involved in Mesrine's killing.

The two-part film, Mesrine recounting Mesrine's career and starring Vincent Cassel in the lead role, was released in France in 2008 and in the UK in August 2009. The first part is titled Mesrine: Killer Instinct (L'instinct de mort) and the second one Mesrine: Public Enemy No. 1 (L'ennemi public No. 1). Gérard Depardieu, who had played a Mesrine pastiche in 1980, also appears in that film, this time as Mesrine's mentor.

Popular French-Algerian rap duo PNL released a track titled "Porte de Mesrine" in 2015.
