= Games for the Many =

British political & game organisation

Games for the Many was a British video game collective closely associated with the UK Labour Party. Founded in 2017 by James Moulding, Rosa Carbo-Mascarell and Richard Barbrook, Games for the Many worked to develop a volunteer community of game designers and game developers, and produce campaign video games for the Labour Party. Games for the Many is closely associated with situationist ludic-science group Class Wargames, of which Barbrook and Moulding are both members.

The group supported Labour in the 2017 general election with their game Corbyn Run.

== Corbyn Run ==
Corbyn Run was a video game produced by Games for the Many during the 2017 general election, in which the leftist Labour leader chases after bankers and Conservative party ministers. The group cited La France Insoumise' video game Fiscal Kombat as the inspiration behind their project. The game was featured in the Design Museum's "Hope to Nope: Graphics and politics" 2008-18 exhibition, prior the game's removal from the exhibition as part of a collective protest after the museum held an event for private arms dealers.

== A Very British Coup megagame ==
A Very British Coup was a megagame produced by Games for the Many and games company Stone Paper Scissors based on the novel A Very British Coup written by British Labour politician Chris Mullin. The game was played as part of The World Transformed festival in 2018.

== Wargaming for government ==
Games for the Many worked with Shadow Chancellor John McDonnell to war-game the aftermath of a potential Labour election victory, plotting out the different scenarios the party might face in power, such as a run on the pound.
