= Newspeak House =

Political technology college and event space in London

- The London College of Political Technology
- Formation: 2015; 11 years ago
- Founder: Edward Saperia
- Type: Independent residential college
- Purpose: Studying and supporting civic technology and political technology communities
- Headquarters: 133–135 Bethnal Green Road, Bethnal Green, London, England
- Dean: Edward Saperia
- Website: newspeak.house

Newspeak House Feb 3 2018

Newspeak House, formally The London College of Political Technology, is an independent residential college and event space on Bethnal Green Road in east London, founded in 2015 by Edward Saperia. It acts as a hub for the United Kingdom's civic technology community, hosting a programme of public events and running a one-year residential fellowship for people working at the intersection of technology, politics and civil society. Projects and organisations developed at or closely associated with the college include the Coronavirus Tech Handbook, the Centre for Democracy, Games for the Many and Campaign Lab, and in 2016 it hosted Jeremy Corbyn's launch of the Labour Party's Digital Democracy Manifesto.

== History ==
Newspeak House was founded by Edward Saperia, a former digital community organiser who conceived and led the organisation of Wikimania 2014, the Wikimedia movement's annual conference, held at the Barbican Centre in London. Saperia was named UK Wikimedian of the Year by Jimmy Wales at the conference's closing ceremony.

Saperia opened the college in 2015 in a building he owned on Bethnal Green Road, initially describing the project as a "hackspace for politics" combining residencies for technologists and activists with a community events space. The college describes its mission as "to study, nurture and inspire emerging communities of practice across civil society and the public sector in the UK", and uses the term "political technology" for its field of study.

On 30 August 2016 the Labour leader Jeremy Corbyn launched the party's Digital Democracy Manifesto, an eight-point programme of digital policy pledges, at Newspeak House. In 2017 Boing Boing profiled the college as "East London's den of civic hackers".

Tom Steinberg, founder of mySociety, has said of the college that "everyone in the UK who has any interest in tech mixed with politics, government, journalism or social change should spend time here".

== Activities ==
The college has two core activities: a calendar of public events at its campus, and a one-year residential programme for "emerging leaders" in political technology. Since 2015 it has hosted thousands of events, including lectures, meetups, hackathons, conferences, workshops and film screenings, across areas such as civic technology, democratic reform, open data, service design and campaign innovation.

The building also hosts recurring meetups for civic technology and campaigning communities, including Citizen Beta, a meetup on technology for politics and the civic sector, and Wine and Wotsits, a regular gathering of campaigners and social activists.

Each year a small cohort of residents lives at the college while studying its surrounding communities of practice. Graduates of the programme, of whom there are more than eighty, become Fellows of Newspeak House. The college hosts Ration Club, a regular weekly community dinner open to visitors. Teaching is supported by a visiting faculty of practitioners from government, academia, civil society and the technology sector. The college supports the Civic Tech Field Guide, a global directory of civic technology projects curated by its librarian, Matt Stempeck.

== Associated organisations ==
During the 2017 general election campaign, Games for the Many, a video game collective closely associated with the Labour Party founded by Richard Barbrook, James Moulding and Rosa Carbo-Mascarell, produced the campaign game Corbyn Run out of Newspeak House, which had opened its space to political technologists ahead of the election.

Campaign Lab, a network of Labour-supporting campaigners, data scientists and technologists, was founded in May 2018 and incubated at Newspeak House, where it was supported by the college together with Labour Party think tank Labour Together.

In 2024 The Spectator reported on Future House, a techno-optimist community founded by Joe Reeve, a former Newspeak House fellow, with three of its founding members drawn from the college's fellowship.

== Projects ==
=== Coronavirus Tech Handbook ===
In March 2020, at the start of the COVID-19 pandemic, Saperia and Newspeak House launched the Coronavirus Tech Handbook, a crowdsourced library of tools, services and resources for technologists responding to the pandemic. The handbook drew contributions from thousands of technologists, researchers and civic organisations worldwide, and received a £50,000 grant from the innovation foundation Nesta in April 2020. Its work was guided by an advisory board including Katherine Maher, then executive director of the Wikimedia Foundation; Bill Thompson of the BBC; Theo Blackwell, chief digital officer of the Greater London Authority; and Jeni Tennison, chief executive of the Open Data Institute.

=== UK Democracy Handbook and Centre for Democracy ===
Following the Coronavirus Tech Handbook, in 2020 Saperia and a project team of James Moulding, Joe Mitchell, Jonny Chambers and Michelle Man received seed funding from Nesta to create the UK Democracy Handbook, applying the same collaborative handbook model to organisations working on democracy in the UK. The project developed into the Centre for Democracy, founded in January 2021 to support the ecosystem of UK democracy organisations through a sector directory, jobs and grants listings and a fortnightly newsletter; its functions were later absorbed into the UK Democracy Network.

=== Civic AI Observatory ===
In 2023 Newspeak House and Nesta jointly launched the Civic AI Observatory, a programme studying the implications of generative artificial intelligence for civil society organisations.

=== Research ===
In February 2026, Newspeak House and Campaign Lab co-authored Democracy on Default Settings, a report published by the think tank Demos on how outdated systems and tooling undermine the day-to-day work of members of Parliament.
