= A Game of War =

Book and board wargame by Guy Debord

- Title cover of original French language Le Jeu de la Guerre (1987)
- Author: Guy Debord and Alice Becker-Ho
- Original title: Le Jeu de la Guerre
- Language: French
- Publisher: Champ libre, Atlas Press
- Publication date: 1987
- Publication place: France
- English publication date: 2006
- Media type: Book

A Game of War is a book by Guy Debord and Alice Becker-Ho that illustrates a game devised by Debord by giving a detailed account of one of their table-top conflicts.

== History ==
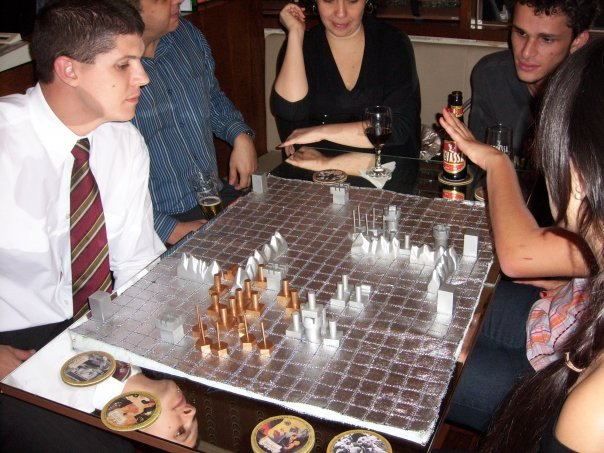
Game of War being played at Class Wargames club night, Café com Letras, Belo Horizonte, Brazil, 29 April 2009

Debord developed the game by 1965, but it was not published until 1977, and then only as a very limited edition with pieces made in copper and silver. The first mass market edition was published in French as Le Jeu de la Guerre in 1987, but unsold copies were later pulped in 1991, along with other books by Debord, at his insistence when he left his publisher Champ libre. The book was reissued in 2006, with an English translation published by Atlas Press in 2008.

In his 1989 book Panegyric, Guy Debord remarked:

So I have studied the logic of war. Indeed I succeeded long ago in representing its essential movements on a rather simple game-board... I played this game, and in the often difficult conduct of my life drew a few lessons from it — setting rules for my life, and abiding by them. The surprises vouchsafed by this Kriegspiel of mine seem endless; I rather fear it may turn out to be the only one of my works to which people will venture to accord any value. As to whether I have made good use of its lessons, I shall leave that for others to judge.

Apart from the books which contain the game, free online versions of the game are available.

London based group, Class Wargames have reproduced A Game of War and taken it on a campaign around the globe, at Belo Horizonte, pictured above, St. Petersburg and a variety of other locations.

== Play ==
The basics of the game are close to those of chess, in that it is based on war and the strategy that surrounds it.

Two players take turns moving troops across the board. Each player can move up to 5 troops each turn and is allowed 1 attack. Attacking is decided by summing all the offensive power in the range of an enemy target square. Then subtracting the total defensive power of the other player. If this number is greater than 2 then the attack is a success. Power is added from all the attacking pieces in a straight line either vertical horizontal or diagonally to the attacking square. The game board has natural obstructions that simulate the different terrain on a battlefield. The winner either defeats all their opponent's troops, or destroys their arsenals.

When making the game, Debord claimed there were only three things that stopped his game from being 100% accurate: climate conditions and the cycles of day and night; the influence of troop morale; and uncertainty about the exact positions and movements of the enemy. The game and book of the same name did not receive much success but a copy can still be bought today.

=== Game board ===
Schematic board for Le Jeu de la Guerre

The game takes place on a 500-cell rectangular board, arrayed in 25 columns (numbered 1 through 25) and 20 rows (lettered A through T). The board is divided into north and south halves, each 10 rows (Rows A through J and rows K through T); each half has the same terrain features:

Board features in Le Jeu de la Guerre
Symbol	Name	Qty	North half locations	South half locations	Description
	Mountains	9	C10:C13; D10; E10; G10:I10	N11:N16; P16:R16	Mountains are impassible.
	Pass	1	F10	O16	Passes grant a +2 defense bonus to occupying forces.
	Fort	3	B8, I13, H21	M3, L15, O23	Forts grant a +4 defense bonus to occupying forces.
	Arsenal	2	D8, B15	T3, T23	Lines of communication radiate from each arsenal in horizontal, vertical, and diagonal straight lines. When both arsenals are lost, the game is over.

=== Game pieces ===
Each player controls 15 pieces at the start of the game; the communication repeater pieces may be deployed as desired:

Player pieces in Le Jeu de la Guerre
Symbol	Name	Qty	Speed	Range	Defense	Offense
	Infantry (foot soldier)	9	1	2	6	4
	Cavalry (mounted soldier)	4	2	2	5	7
	Artillery (foot)	1	1	3	8	5
	Artillery (mounted)	1	2	3	8	5
	Communications repeater (foot)	1	1	—N/a	1	—N/a
	Communications repeater (mounted)	1	2	—N/a	1	—N/a

=== Lines of communication ===
Example (1), providing one starting placement for both players' pieces; note how the repeaters have created additional lines of communication to bring all the pieces under control.

In Debord's game, lines of communication radiate from each arsenal in straight lines: vertical, horizontal, and diagonal, but they are halted by opposing pieces and mountain ranges. For example, the arsenal at D8 has, by default:

- A vertical line of communication extending along column 8 (A8:T8);
- A horizontal line extending along row D (D1:D9), attenuated by the mountain range at D10;
- A diagonal line extending from A5 to T24; and
- A second diagonal line extending from K1 to A11.

In addition, each player starts with two communication repeater pieces; when a repeater is placed on one of the arsenal communication lines, it radiates additional lines of communication horizontally, vertically, and diagonally in the same way as the arsenals, subject to the same hard stops at mountain ranges and opposing pieces.

Consider the illustrated example (1). The yellow (south) player has placed a mounted communications repeater at O8, which lies on a diagonal line of communication from the arsenal at T3; the communications repeater has its own set of communication lines in column 8, row O, and the diagonal line H1:T13, while the other diagonal line repeats the arsenal's existing line of communication. The vertical line of communication in column 8 only extends from F8:T8, as the blue infantry piece at E8 blocks further communication north. Alternatively, the blue arsenal's vertical line of communication in column 8 extends from A8:N8, as it is blocked from propagating further south by the communication repeater at O8. In addition, the yellow (south) mounted artillery piece at L15 blocks the diagonal line of communication from the arsenal at D8.

The player's pieces may be commanded if they lie on at least one of the lines of communication emanating from the arsenals and communication repeater pieces, or if they are adjacent to (sharing a side or corner of) a friendly piece that is in communication. If a piece does not meet these requirements, it is inert and immobile until communications can be re-established, and any attack on a piece out of communication will automatically destroy the stranded piece. For example, the yellow infantry piece at M14 is in communication, as it is diagonally adjacent to the mounted artillery at L15, which is on a diagonal line of communication from the arsenal at T23.

== Reviews ==
- Jeux & Stratégie #45 (as "Le Jeu de la Guerre")

== See also ==
- Three-sided football
