= Coronavirus Tech Handbook =

Website about COVID-19

- Website type: Wiki
- Website: coronavirustechhandbook.com
- Commercial: No
- Launched: March 2020

The Coronavirus Tech Handbook was a website designed to crowdsource information about the SARS-CoV-2 coronavirus. It was developed at Newspeak House, a hackerspace for politics in London, England.

The site, which launched in March 2020, was hosted as an interlinked collection of user-editable online documents, which made it effectively a wiki. As of October 2020, it had expanded to provide tools for consumers, businesses, local governments, and developers, amongst others, to help combat the COVID-19 pandemic.

Its stated aim was to provide:

a space for technologists, civic organisations, public & private institutions, researchers and specialists of all kinds to collaborate on a rapid and sophisticated response to the coronavirus outbreak and subsequent impacts.
