= Rello =

- Municipality
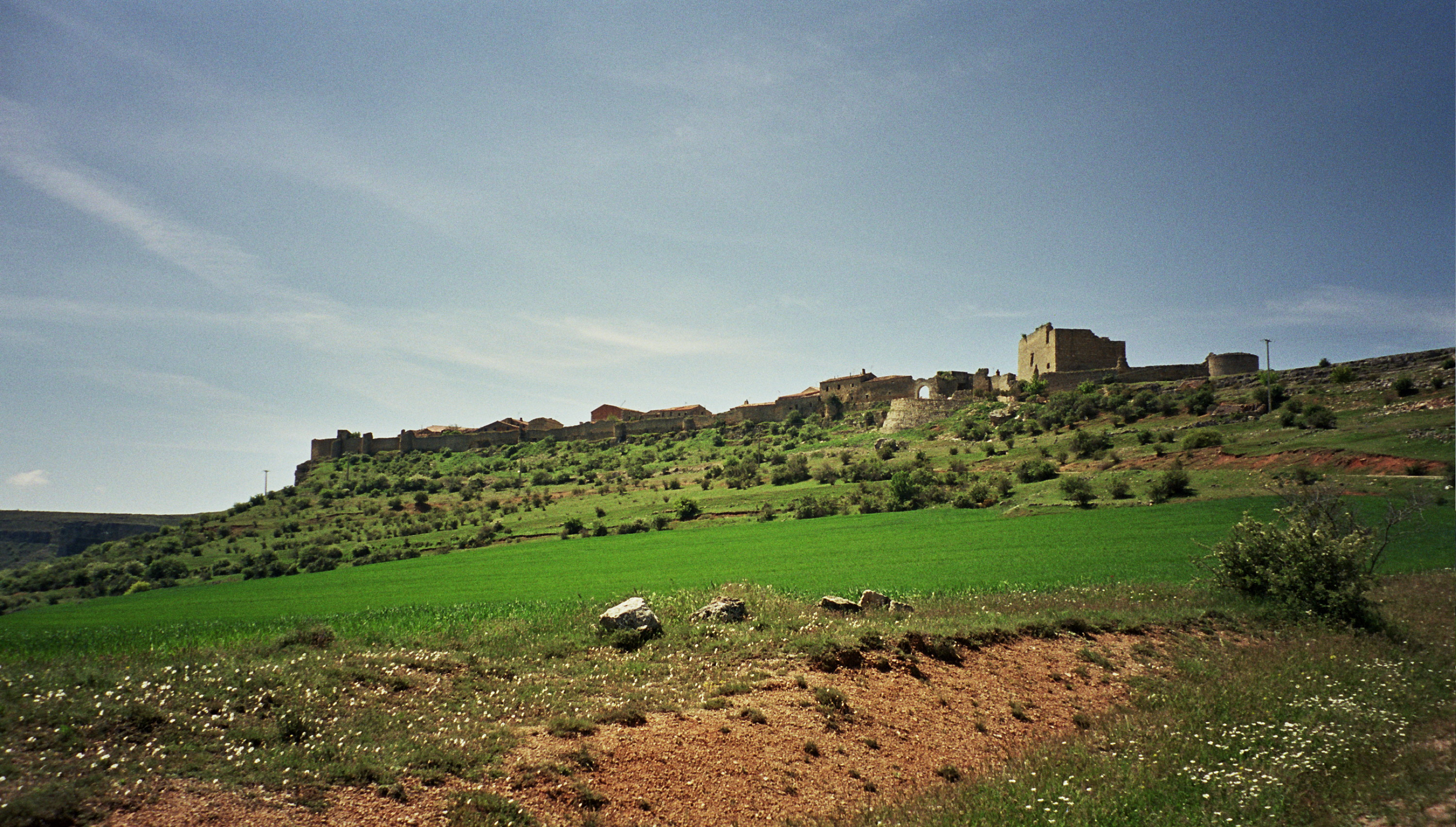

- Location in Spain. Rello (Spain)
- Coordinates: 41°19′58″N 2°44′59″W
- Country: Spain
- Autonomous community: Castile and León
- Province: Soria
- Municipality: Rello

Area
  - Total: 24 km^{2} (9.3 sq mi)

Population (2025-01-01)
  - Total: 21
  - Density: 0.87/km^{2} (2.3/sq mi)
- Time zone: UTC+1 (CET)
  - Summer (DST): UTC+2 (CEST)

Rello is a municipality located in the province of Soria, Castile and León, Spain. According to the 2004 census (INE), the municipality has a population of 33 inhabitants.

== Bibliography ==
- (in French)Alice Becker-Ho, Là s'en vont les seigneuries, photos by Emmanuel Rioufol, 2003.
