= False Gestures for a Devious Public =

Studio album by The Blood
- Released: 1983
- Genre: Punk rock
- Label: Noise

The Blood chronology
False Gestures for a Devious Public (1983)	Se Parare Nex (1985)

False Gestures for a Devious Public is the Blood's debut album, originally released in late 1983 on the short lived Noise label, and which reached No. 5 in the Independent Chart.

Uber Rock website noted that "Back in 1983 the album ‘False Gestures For A Devious Public’ somehow managed to merge the very best elements of punk rock and shock rock and propelled itself into the world as a cataclysmic 11 track rock ‘n’ roll insurrection. One that should have propelled the band behind it on to bigger and better things. The band I’m talking about of course are The Blood".

The band's line-up for the album was:

- The Cardinal (Colin Smith) - vocals, songwriter, producer

- J.J Bedsore (James Cantwell) - guitar, producer

- Muttz (Anthony Skinner) - bass

- Frankie Boy (Frank Marshall) - keyboards

- Napoleon Evo Moby Dick Tankhead III (Paul Evans) - drums

== Track listing ==
1. "Done Some Brain Cells Last Nite"
2. "Degenerate"
3. "Gestapo Khazi"
4. "Well Sick"
5. "Sewer Brain"
6. "Sucker"
7. "Mesrine"
8. "Rule 43"
9. "Joys Of Noise"
10. "Waste Of Flesh And Bone"
11. "Throttle Ya Blue"

Bonus track on CD version

- "Such Fun" ("Oi! Oi! That's Yer Lot" Version)
- "Megalomania"
- "Parasite In Paradise"
- "Calling The Shots"
- "Stark Raving Normal"
- "Such Fun" (LP Out-Take)
- "Megalomania" (LP Out-Take)
- "Napalm Job" (Demo)
- "Coffin Dodgers" (Demo)
- "Drunk Addict" (Demo)
