= Alice Becker-Ho =

French poet (born 1941)

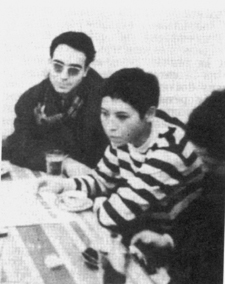
- Becker-Ho seated alongside Mustapha Khayati (left), 1966
- Born: August 6, 1941 (age 85); Shanghai, Empire of Japan
- Other name: Alice Debord
- Spouse: Guy Debord (m. 1972; died 1994)
- Writing career
- Notable work: A Game of War
- Movement: Situationist International

Alice Becker-Ho, also known as Alice Debord (born August 6, 1941), is a Chinese-born French intellectual closely associated with the Situationist International. Among other works, she has written poetry, a scholarly study of slang, and a travel memoir. The widow of Guy Debord, she is best known for being the editor of his complete letters, which have been published in eight volumes.

== Early life ==
Becker-Ho was born in Shanghai to a Chinese mother and a father originally from Alsace-Lorraine, a territory under dispute between France and Germany until the end of the First World War. In 1947, claiming French citizenship, her father moved the family to France.

== Career ==
In 1963 Becker-Ho became involved in the Situationist International. She began what would be a long-lasting relationship with Guy Debord; they married August 5, 1972 and were together until his death in 1994. They co-authored Le Jeu de la Guerre (A Game of War) in 1987, an expanded edition of which was republished by éditions Gallimard, Paris, in 2006. An English edition appeared in 2008.

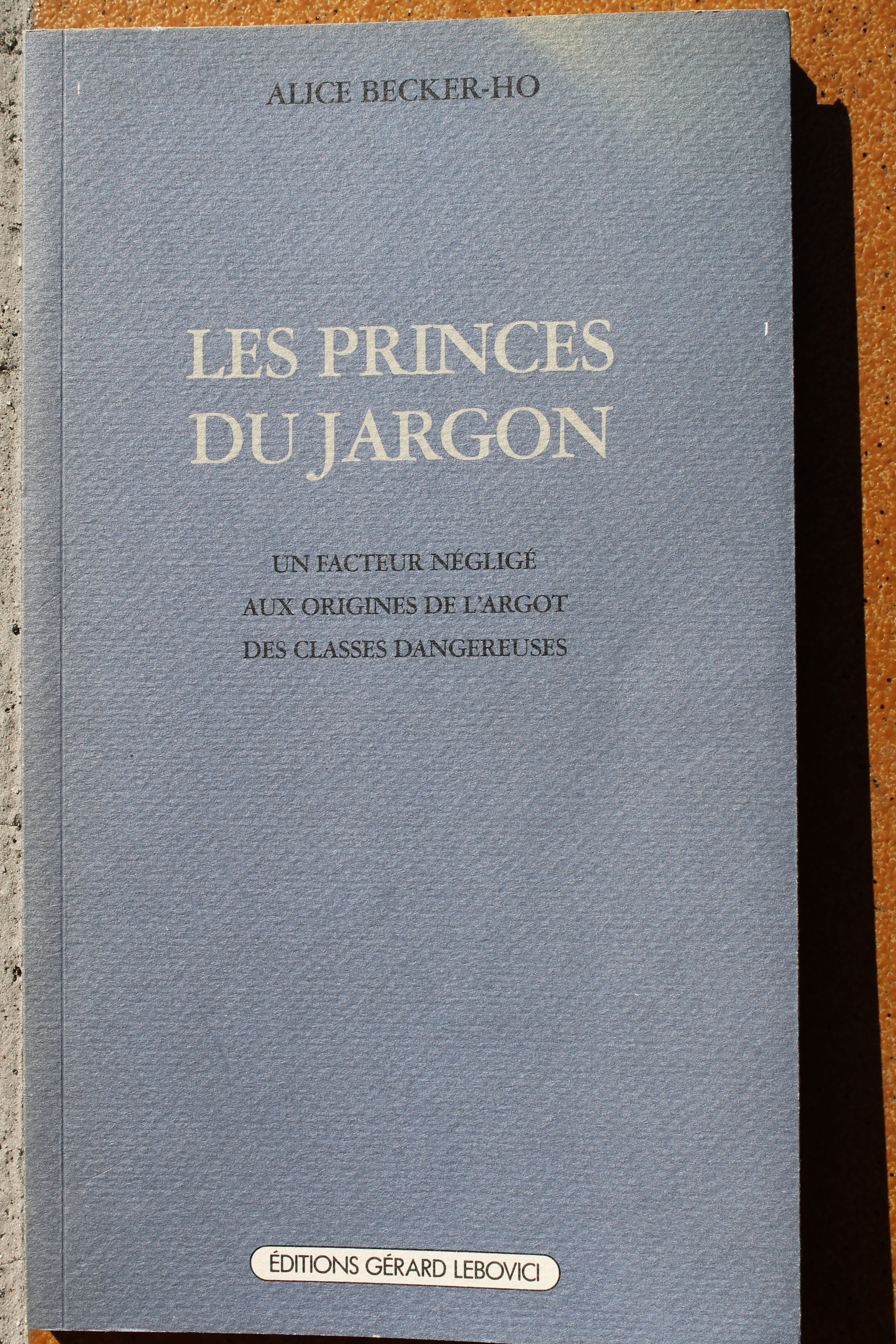
Les Princes du jargon, published by Éditions Gérard Lebovici in 1990.

Becker-Ho has published several works of poetry in French: D'azur au triangle vidé de sable (Cognac: Le Temps qu'il fait, 2000); Paroles de Gitans (Paris: Albin Michel, 2000); and Au Pays du sommeil paradoxal (Cognac: Le Temps qu'il fait, 2000). She has also written a three-volume study of Western European slang. The first volume, Les Princes du Jargon (Paris: Gallimard, 1993), was translated into English as The Princes of Jargon by John McHale and published in 2004 by Edwin Mellen Press. The other two volumes, L’Essence du Jargon and Du Jargon, héritier en bastardie (Paris: Gallimard), have not appeared in English. She also authored Au Pays du Sommeil Paradoxal (translated as In Slumberpuzzleland) and Là s'en vont les seigneuries, an account of her travels with Guy Debord in Rello, Spain, with photos by Emmanuel Rioufol (2003).

Further works include 2004's Le premier ghetto ou l'exemplarité vénitienne, a book about the Venetian Ghetto, translated into English by John McHale and published by 1968 Press in 2022, and 2018's La part maudite dans l'œuvre de François Villon.

After Debord's death in 1994, Becker-Ho began the process of assembling and editing his letters. Starting in 1999, they were published by Fayard as eight volumes of Correspondance, the final volume appearing in 2010.

== Selected works ==
- Excerpt from The Essence of Jargon in Parser, issue 1, Vancouver, May 2007
- A Game of War (Le Jeu de la Guerre) by Guy Debord & Alice Becker-Ho, trans. Donald Nicholson-Smith, Atlas Press, London 2007.
- The Essence of Jargon: Argot & the Dangerous Classes, trans. John McHale, Autonomedia, 2015.
- The First Ghetto or Venetian Exemplariness, trans. John McHale, 1968 Press, London 2022.
