= Class Wargames =

British organization

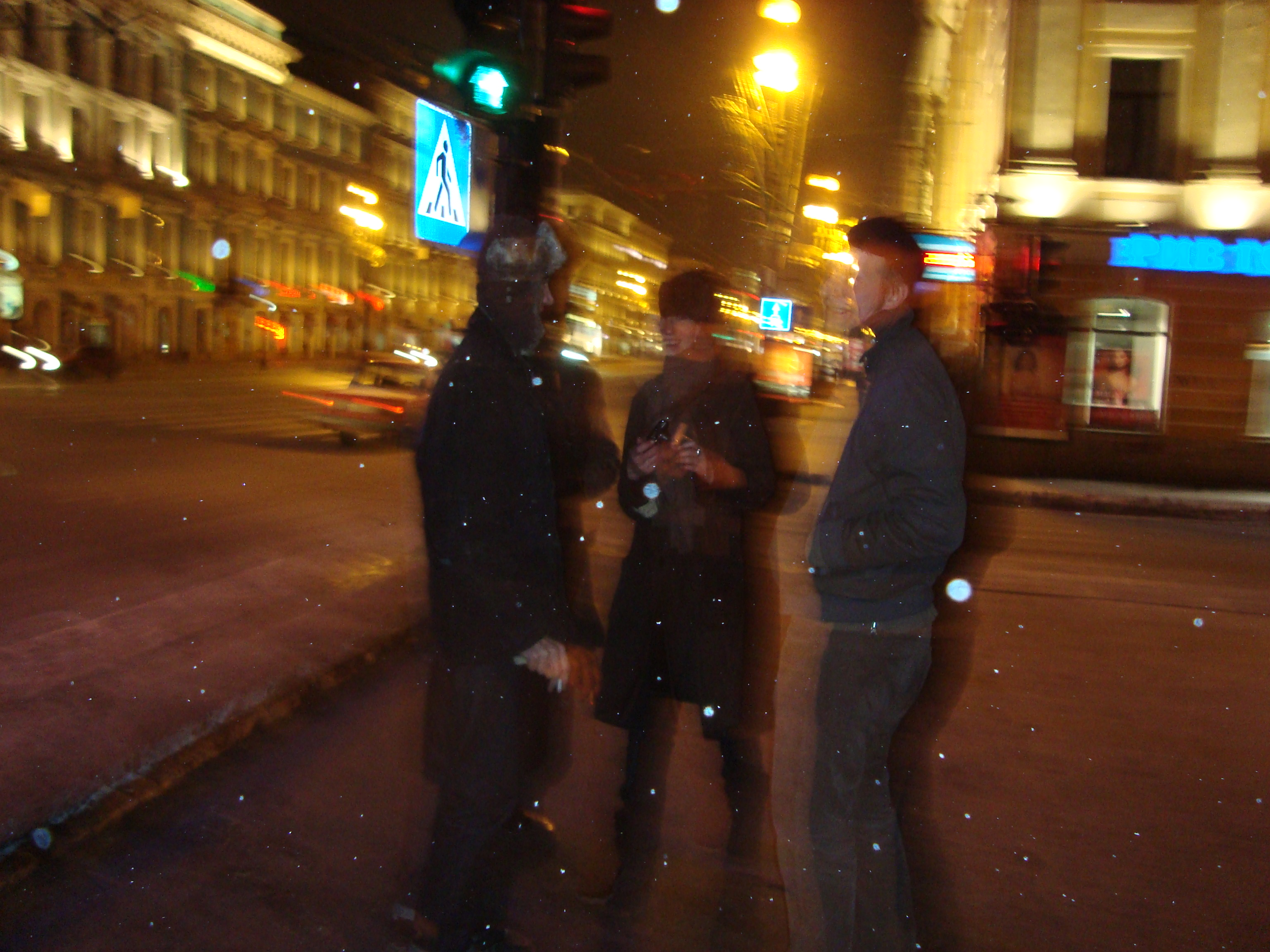
- Class Wargames in St. Petersburg (2008)
- Founder: Richard Barbrook, Fabian Tompsett
- Key people: Richard Barbrook, Ilze Black, Lucy Blake, Mark Copplestone, Rod Dickinson, Stefan Lutschinger, James Moulding, Fabian Tompsett, Alex Veness, Elena Vorontsova
- Website: www.classwargames.net

Class Wargames is a situationist ludic-science group based in London. Founded by Richard Barbrook and Fabian Tompsett in 2007, the group has since reproduced Guy Debord's Le Jeu de la Guerre and proceeded to tour Europe, Asia and South America. In contrast to the electronic version of Debord's game, created by the Radical Software Group, Class Wargames is based on a real rather than digital version of the Game of War and allows for convivial interaction through which anyone can become a situationist.

Meaningful Votes: The Brexit Simulation was a wargame designed by Richard Barbrook to help understand the dynamics of the political factions in United Kingdom in regards to the Brexit referendum.

== Publications ==
- Barbrook, Richard (2014). Class Wargames: Ludic Subversion Against Spectacular Capitalism (paperback ed.). London: Minor Compositions. ISBN 978-1-57027-293-6
- Barbrook, Richard and Tompsett, Fabian (2012) Class Wargames Presents Guy Debord's The Game of War (paperback ed.). London: Unpopular Books.
- Lutschinger, Stefan (2014) (ed.) Klassenkampfspiele (paperback ed.). London: Unpopular Books. ISBN 978-1-871593-92-1
