= Atlas Press =

- Founded: 1983
- Country of origin: United Kingdom
- Distribution: Turnaround Publisher Services
- Fiction genres: Fiction, non-fiction
- Official website: www.atlaspress.co.uk

Atlas Press began publishing in 1983, and specialises in extremist and avant-garde prose writing from the 1890s to the present day. It is the largest publisher in English of books on Surrealism and has an extensive list relating to Dada, Surrealism, Expressionism, the Oulipo, the Collège de ‘Pataphysique, Vienna Actionists among others.

Chief editor is Alastair Brotchie, German-language and series editor is Malcolm Green, French-language and series editor is Antony Melville, and copy editor and annotator is Chris Allen.

Atlas Press is also linked to the Secretariat of and is the publishing body of The London Institute of 'Pataphysics, whose President is Peter Blegvad.
