= The Blood (band) =

English punk rock band

- Also known as: Coming Blood
- Origin: London, England
- Genres: Punk rock, Oi!
- Years active: 1982–present
- Members: The Cardinal; JeSus the Atheist; Eve of Destruction; Sonic Offender; Pablo Veliz
- Past members: JJ Bedsore; Doctor Wild Thing; Muttley; Evo; Frankie Flame; Micky James; Mark Mitchell; Phil Butcher Taylor; Gaz; Gareth; Shane Atlas; Mark Hannan/Blitz/Shane Atlas; Brad Sims; Richard Hogben; Monty-Mutent The Merciful; Dave Shit; The Hammond Summers; Nick Pilton
- Website: www.theblood.biz

The Blood are an English, London-based punk rock band, formed in 1982. Led by Cardinal Jesus Hate and JJ Bedsore (AKA Colin Smith and Jamie Cantwell), the band formed in the early 1980s under the name "Coming Blood". Their music is a blend of hardcore punk, Oi!, heavy metal, football chants and shock rock.

Many of their songs criticize religion or discuss political or philosophical topics.

== Career ==
Their first single, "Megalomania", ridiculed the Pope. Doctor Wild Thing played drums on "Megalomania". Their second single release "Stark Raving Normal" (a double A side with "Mesrine") criticized one-dimensional patriotism, apathy and mediocrity. The Cardinal calls himself a punk secular humanist. Their first album, False Gestures for a Devious Public featuring Evo (ex Angelic Upstarts, Warfare and Major Accident) on drums (1983), hit the UK top 30 and was voted one of the year's best releases by Sounds magazine. They used to be managed by Garry Bushell, and their song "Such Fun" was on the Oi! compilation album Oi! Oi! That's Yer Lot!. The album also included the song "Mesrine" which was an anthem about the French iconoclastic gangster Jacques Mesrine. "Mesrine" was released in 1983 which preceded the release of the film of the same name that was made in 1984. J.J. Bedsore died in 2004 of multiple organ failure due to years of chronic alcoholism.

On 10 December 2006 (International Human Rights Day), The Blood was reformed by the Cardinal and some of his friends to release the song, "Kill The Pimps", on the Eyeline Productions record label. The song criticizes governments that turn a blind eye to human trafficking. On 11 September 2007, The Blood released their first acoustic DVD, Samurai Lullaby, on the Eyeline Productions record label. The film footage on this DVD is taken from the tragedy of 9/11. On 1 June 2008, The Blood released an acoustic CD album punk@theopera. The concept album reveals the voyage of two young people who struggle to free themselves from human-trafficking pimps and a tyrannical religious cult. In 2010, The Blood's latest work came out, a self-penned album, by The Cardinal, @thebodysnatchersball.

On 8 June 2012, The Blood is reformed by The Cardinal, Chema Zurita a.k.a. 'Sonic Offender' and Jesus Ruiz. The new Spanish members of The Blood both grew up in the same town in Alicante. Chema Zurita also being a regular bass player with the Uk Subs. In December 2012 and throughout 2013 the band toured the East and West coast of US, Canada, France, Spain, and Japan bringing the early years anthems back to life as a tribute to The Cardinal and JJ Bedsore's work.

In March 2014, The Blood released "Chorus of Legends", an anthem composed for the World Cup in Brazil 2014.

In August 2016, The Cardinal published Vagabond Vendetta, an autobiographical fantasy which is set in the Republic of Frestonia. In chapter eleven of the novel The Cardinal executes Jimmy Savile, Rolf Harris and Stuart Hall based on the historic evidence that Sex Pistol, Johnny Rotten gave to the BBC in 1978.

== Band members ==
=== 1983 ===
- Cardinal Jesus Hate - vocals
- JJ Bedsore - guitar
- Muttley - bass
- Frankie Flame - Keyboards
- Evo - Drums

=== 1985 ===
- Cardinal Jesus Hate - vocals
- JJ Bedsore - guitar
- Micky James - Bass
- Mark Mitchell - Drums
- Phil Butcher Taylor - Keyboards

=== 1995 ===
- JJ Bedsore - Lead Vocals, Guitar
- Gaz - Lead Vocals, Bass
- Gareth a.k.a. Elvis Christ - Guitar, Backing Vocals
- Shane Atlas - Drums
- Cardinal Smith - vocals on studio track "You Kill My Head Out"

=== 1996 ===
- JJ Bedsore - Lead Vocals, Guitar
- Gaz - Lead Vocals, Bass
- Gareth a.k.a. Elvis Christ - Guitar, Backing Vocals
- Mark Hannan/Blitz/Shane Atlas - Drums

=== 1999 ===
- JJ Bedsore - Lead Vocals, Guitar
- Gaz - Lead Vocals, Bass
- Gareth a.k.a. Elvis Christ - Guitar, Backing Vocals
- Brad Sims - Drums

=== 2006 ===
- The Cardinal - Lead Vocals, Guitar
- Richard "Orible" Hogben - Drums
- Monty-Mutent The Merciful - Vocals, Keyboards
- Dave Shit - Bass

=== 2007 ===
- The Cardinal - Lead Vocals, Guitar
- The Hammond Summers - Hammond Organ, Piano, Accordion
- Nick Pilton - Backing Vocals

=== 2012 ===
- The Cardinal - Lead Vocals
- JeSus the Atheist - Guitar / Vocals
- Eve of Destruction - Vocals / Keyboard
- Sonic Offender - Bass
- Pablo Veliz - Drums

== Discography ==
Chart placings shown are from the UK Indie Chart.

=== Albums ===
- False Gestures for a Devious Public (1983), Noise - No. 5 (reissued 2005, Captain Oi!)
- Se Parare Nex (1985)
- Smell Yourself (1995) (CD, LP and single, Blind Beggar)
- Spillage (1998) (CD, SolidInc)
- Split Live (w/ Dizzy Dizzy) (recorded 1999, released 2004) (CD, DSI Records)
- punk@theopera (2008) - self-penned CD by the Cardinal
- @thebodysnatchersball (2010)

=== Singles and EPs ===
- Megalomania EP (1983) - No. 6
- Stark Raving Normal (1983) - No. 20
- Fabulous as Usual EP (1996)
- Boots (1997)
- Kill the Pimps (2006)

=== Compilation appearances ===
- Such Fun (on Oi! Oi! That's Yer Lot)
- Stark Raving Normal (on Oi Fuckin' Oi)
- Incubus (on Metal Inferno)
