= Warfare (band) =

British heavy metal band

Background information
- Origin: Newcastle upon Tyne, England
- Genres: Speed metal, heavy metal, punk
- Years active: 1984–1993
- Labels: Neat, FM Revolver
- Past members: Evo; Falken; Gunner; Zlaughter; Lazer; Algy Ward; J.J. Bedsore; Fred Purser; Mantas; Christopher Robert Labron

Warfare was a British heavy metal band from Newcastle upon Tyne that formed in 1982 and disbanded in 1993. They were part of the later stages of the new wave of British heavy metal.

== History ==
The band was founded in 1984 by former The Blood drummer/singer Paul "Evo" Evans, guitarist Gunner (Kelvin Johnson) and bassist Falken (David Taylor). Evo had previously played drums in the punk bands Major Accident, The Blood and Angelic Upstarts, and wanted to "blend metal and punk in a manner not done before". In 1984, Warfare released two singles and an EP. On their second single, the band covered "Two Tribes" by Frankie Goes to Hollywood.

The group also released their debut album Pure Filth in the same year, which was produced by Algy Ward from the band Tank. Cronos from Venom took over vocals and bass on the song "Rose Petals Fall from Her Face". Another EP, Total Death, was released in 1985 for the movie Metal City. The band played very few concerts, and the ones they did play turned into violent cacophony.

The second album Metal Anarchy was produced by Lemmy Kilmister from Motörhead, with Motörhead guitarist Würzel as guest guitarist. The album was released towards the end of 1985. Work then began on the third album. During the recording, bassist Falken left Warfare, leaving Cronos to play bass until Zlaughter (Alan Ward) joined the group as the new permanent bassist.

In 1986, the band released their third album, Mayhem Fuckin' Mayhem, which was produced by Cronos, who also sang guest vocals on "You've Really Got Me", a cover of The Kinks' "You Really Got Me". It was followed by a single with a cover of Robert Palmer's "Addicted to Love". Several concerts followed before the album was released. They interrupted the performances of other bands, including Metallica; Warfare's label Neat Records did not like this and waited until the matter was considered obsolete before releasing the album in 1987.

The fourth album, A Conflict of Hatred, featured Mantas from Venom and keyboardist Lazer joined the band as a new member. After the album's release in 1988, the band moved to FM Revolver Records. The album Hammer Horror, which was a tribute to the British Hammer film studios famous for their horror films, was released on this label in 1990, but Evo was not happy with the label and re-recorded the whole album and released it with extra tracks on Silva Screen Records.

A new line-up emerged in 1991 featuring Evo, Zlaughter and guitarists Algy Ward (ex-Tank) and Evo's onetime The Blood bandmate JJ Bedsore and also Fred Purser of Tygers of Pan Tang on keyboards. After a few more member changes - Ward and Purser being replaced by Mantas and Chris Labron respectively, Warfare disbanded in 1993.

Evo appeared on Warhead's 1995 album Warhead with Algy Ward and Würzel. In 2002, the compilation Metal Anarchy – The Best of Warfare was released on Sanctuary Records with a selection of tracks from their releases. In 2021, Warfare released the 3-CD compilation Songbook of Filth which featured Pete Way and Fast Eddie Clarke recording together for the first time ever since the failed attempt at Fastway ended with Way not performing on their album.

== Musical style ==
Warfare's style has often been compared to that of Tank, Motörhead and Venom, each of whose members also produced one of Warfare's first three albums and contributed to several of their albums. Chris Ward of OneMetal compared "Burn Down the King's Road" from their debut Pure Filth to Venom covering The Clash. Eduardo Rivadavia of AllMusic called the album a slightly slower Motörhead and noted its punk influences.

Urban "Wally" Wallstrom of RockUnited described Metal Anarchy as being "almost recorded live" in three days; the album "couldn't be more primitive and brutal". According to Ward, the song "Living for the Last Days" would not have sounded out of place on Motörhead's album Orgasmatron, released the same year. Wallstrom also described it as entertaining to hear Evo sing Barry McGuire's anti-war song "Eve of Destruction" on the re-release of Metal Anarchy. He described the style of the album as "1980s metal/punk/thrash" and a mix of Motörhead, Tank, Venom, Raven and Bad News.

According to The Thrash Metal Guide, the music on A Conflict of Hatred developed in the direction of more intricate thrash. On Hammer Horror, the band incorporated orchestral passages, doom-heavy riffs, atmospheric, "eerie" passages and, on "Phantom of the Opera", female vocals and "spooky" keyboard melodies; the Guide also sees the album as an influence for later symphonic doom/gothic metal.

== Members ==
- Evo (Paul Evans) – drums, vocals (1982–1993)
- Falken (David Taylor) – bass (1982–1985)
- Gunner (Kelvin Johnson) – guitars (1982–1990)
- Zlaughter (Alan Ward) – bass (1986–1993)
- Lazer – keyboards (1990)
- Algy Ward (RIP 1959 - 2003) – guitars (1991)
- J.J. Bedsore (Jamie Cantwell, RIP 1960-2004) – guitars (lead) (1991)
- Fred Purser – keyboards (1991–1993)
- Chris Labron - keyboards (1993)
- Mantas (Jeffrey Dunn) – guitars (1992–1993)
- Pete Way (2015)
- Fast Eddie Clarke (2015)
- Nik Turner (2015)

== Discography ==
Studio albums

- Pure Filth (1984, Neat Records)
- Metal Anarchy (1985, Neat Records)
- Mayhem, Fuckin' Mayhem (1986, Neat Records)
- A Conflict of Hatred (1988, Neat Records)
- Hammer Horror (1990, Silva Screen Records)

Compilations

- A Crescendo of Reflections (1992, Kraze Records)
- A Decade of Decibels (1993, Bleeding Hearts Records)
- Metal Anarchy – The Best of Warfare (2002, Sanctuary Records)
- The New Age of Total Warfare (2011, Southworld Recordings)
- The Songbook of Filth (2021)
- The Lemmy Sessions CD (2023)
- The Lemmy Sessions Gold Vinyl LP+ Bonus 12" (2025, Cadiz Music & Digital)

EPs

- Noise, Filth and Fury (1984, Neat Records)
- Total Death (1985, Neat Records)

Singles

- "Two Tribes" (1984, Neat Records)
- "This Machine Kills" (1984, Neat Records)
- "Addicted to Love" (1987, Neat Records)

Other releases

- Metal City (split VHS with Avenger, Venom and Saracen, 1987, Prism Entertainment)
- A Concept of Hatred (VHS, 1988, self-released)
- Deathcharge (live album, 1991, R.K.T. Records)
- Radio Hell: The Friday Rock Show Sessions (split with Venom and Raven, 1992, Raw Fruit Records)
