= Richard Barbrook =

British academic

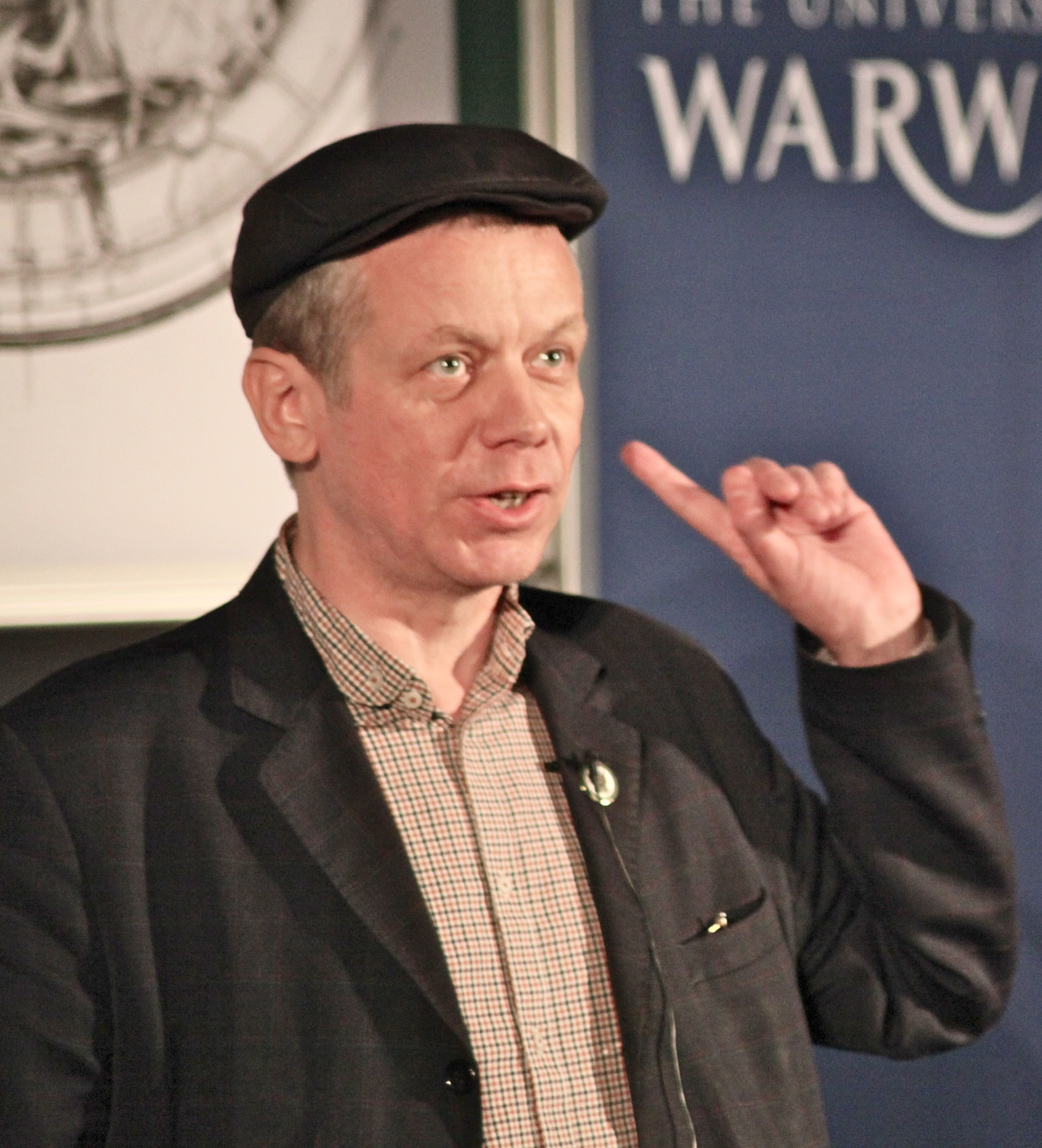
- Born: 1956 (age 69–70); Nottingham
- Occupation: Politician

Academic background
- Education: Professor
- Alma mater: Downing College, Cambridge, University of Essex & University of Kent

Academic work
- Institutions: University of Westminster

Richard Barbrook is an academic in the School of Social Sciences, Humanities and Languages at the University of Westminster.

== Early life ==
Barbrook was born in Nottingham in 1956 and grew up in Canterbury, where his father taught US politics at the University of Kent.

He attended Kent College and studied for a BA in Social & Political Science at Downing College, Cambridge, an MA in Political Behaviour at the University of Essex and a doctorate in Politics & Government at the University of Kent.

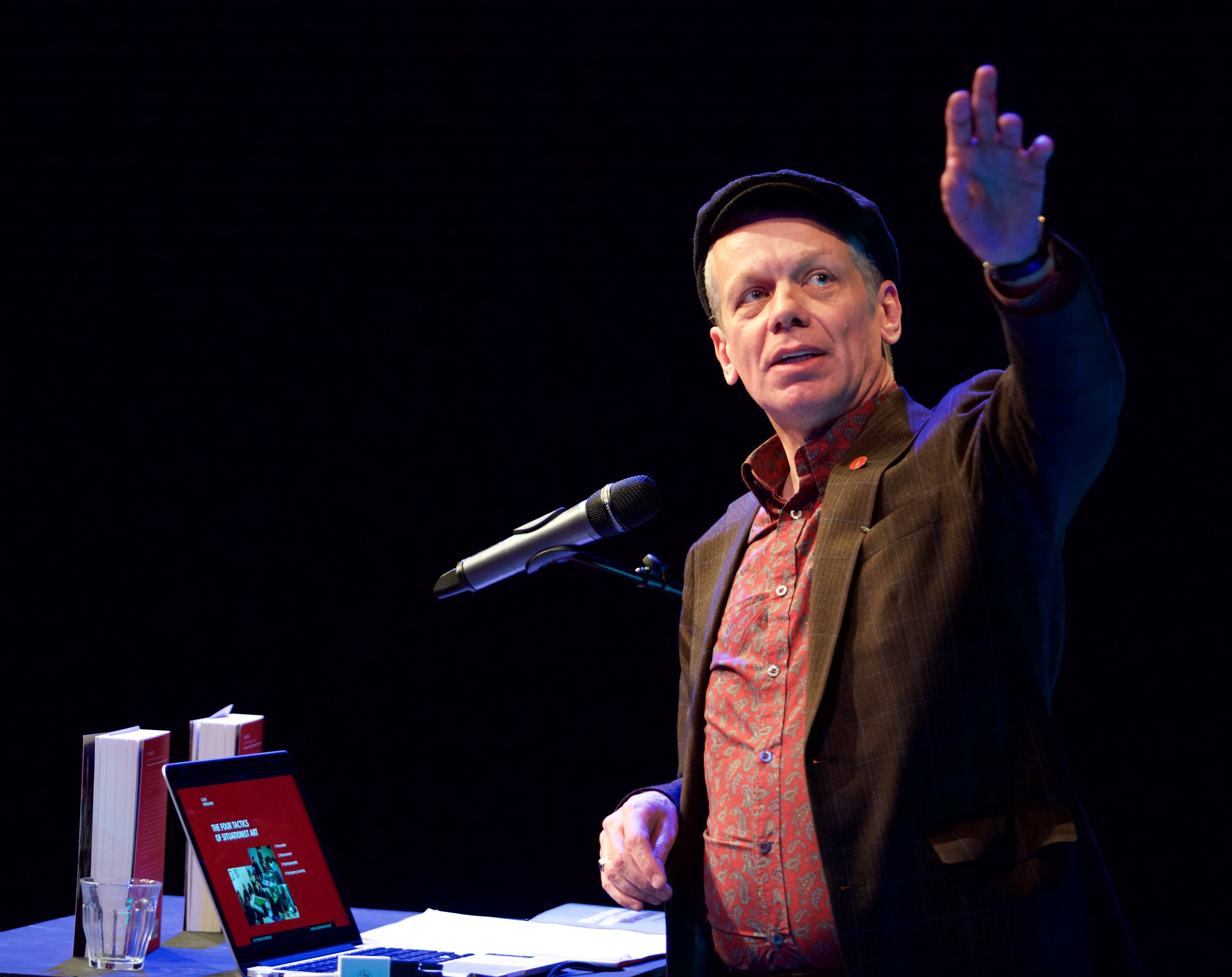
Barbrook in 2015

Barbrook joined the Labour Party in 1980, aligning himself with the Labour Briefing left within the party.

== Career ==
In the early 1980s, he was involved with pirate and community radio broadcasting. Helping to set up the multi-lingual Spectrum Radio station in London, he published extensively on radio issues during this period.

Having worked on media regulation within the EU for some years at a research institute at the University of Westminster, much of his material was published in his 1995 book Media Freedom. In the same year, he became the coordinator of the Hypermedia Research Centre at Westminster's Media School and was the first course leader of its MA in Hypermedia Studies.

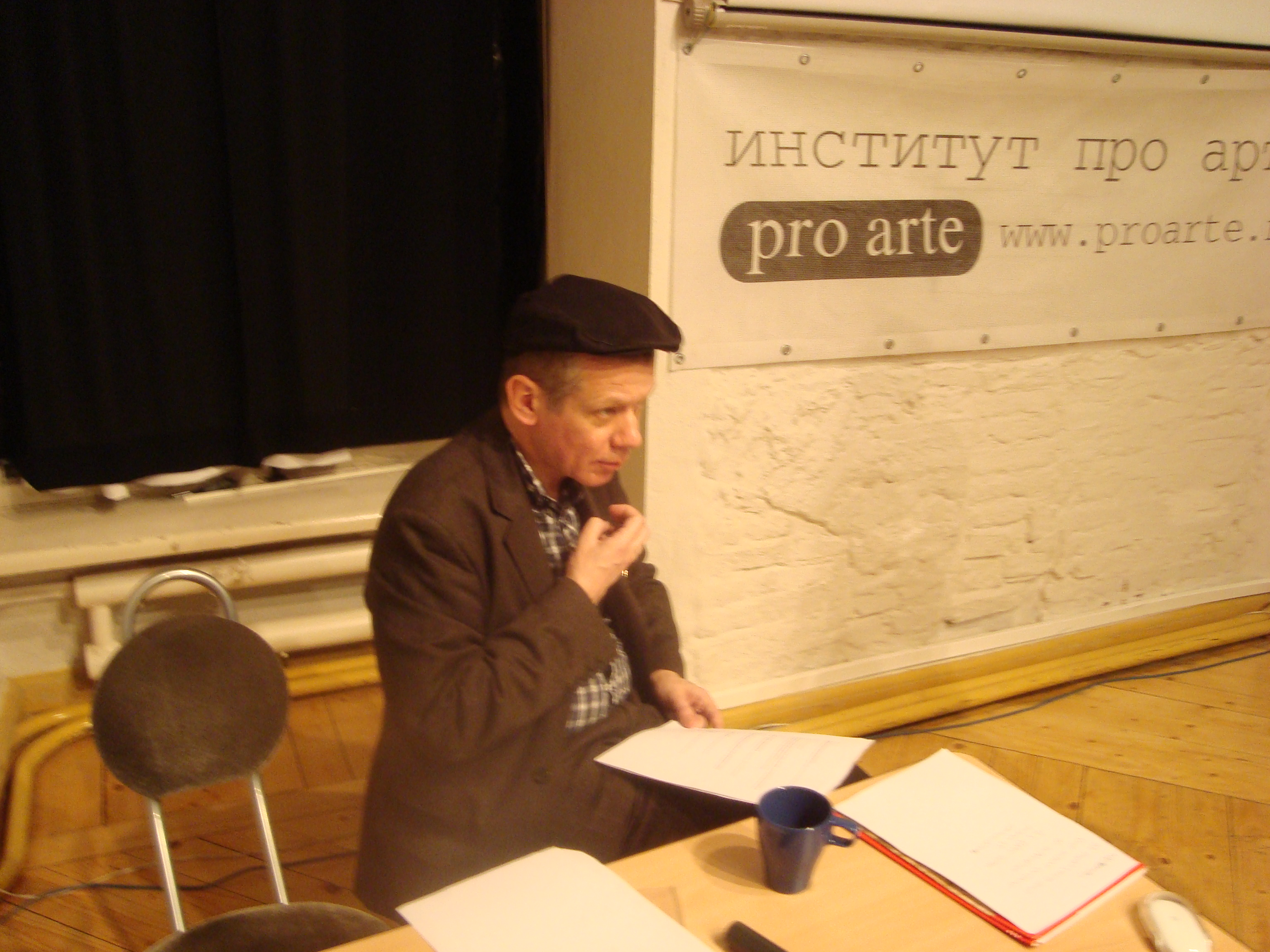
Barbrook delivering a lecture at Pro Arte, Saint Petersburg, Russia, November 2008

Working with Andy Cameron (interactive artist), he wrote the essay "The Californian Ideology" a pioneering critique of the neo-liberal politics of Wired magazine. His other important writings about the Net include "The Hi-Tech Gift Economy", "Cyber-communism", "The Regulation of Liberty", and "The Class of the New".

In 2007, Barbook moved to the Social Sciences School of the University of Westminster and published his study of the political and ideological role of the prophecies of artificial intelligence and the information society Imaginary Futures.

The Media Ecology Association selected Imaginary Futures as the winner of the 2008 Marshall McLuhan Award for Outstanding Book of the Year in the Field of Media Ecology. Barbrook is a founding member of Class Wargames and co-wrote the script to the group's film: Ilze Black (director), Class Wargames Presents Guy Debord's The Game of War.

During the 2016 Labour leadership election, he wrote Jeremy Corbyn's Digital Democracy Manifesto. In May 2017, he assisted in the development of the viral 2017 general election videogame CorbynRun. In November 2017, Barbrook began working with the Labour Party on digital democracy and games. His work focuses on preparing the Labour for government through crisis planning and role-playing of future scenarios that may occur after a potential Labour election win.

== Selected works ==
- Barbrook, Richard (2015). The Internet Revolution: from dot-com capitalism to cybernetic communism (PDF). Amsterdam: Network Notebooks. ISBN 978-94-92302-01-4..
- Barbrook, Richard (2014). Class Wargames: ludic subversion against spectacular capitalism (PDF) (paperback ed.). Wivenhoe / New York / Port Hudson: Minor Compositions. ISBN 978-1-57027-293-6..
- Barbrook, Richard (2007). Imaginary Futures: from thinking machines to the global village (paperback ed.). London: Pluto Press. ISBN 978-0-7453-2660-3..
- Barbrook, Richard (2006). The Class of the New (PDF) (paperback ed.). London: OpenMute. ISBN 0-9550664-7-6..
- Barbrook, Richard (2000) [1999]. "Cyber-Communism: How The Americans Are Superseding Capitalism In Cyberspace". Science as Culture. 9 (1), 5–40.
- Barbrook, Richard. (15 May 1996). "Global Algorithm 1.5: Hypermedia Freedom". CTheory. 19 (1–2).
- Barbrook, Richard (1995). Media Freedom: the contradictions of communications in the age of modernity (paperback ed.). London: Pluto Press. ISBN 978-0-7453-0943-9.
- Barbrook, Richard. Andy Cameron. (1996) [1995] "The Californian Ideology". Science as Culture. 26, 44–72.
