= Champ Libre =

French publisher

Champ Libre is a French publisher founded in 1969 by Gérard Lebovici in Paris. The name is taken from a phrase which means "free field" (the way is clear).

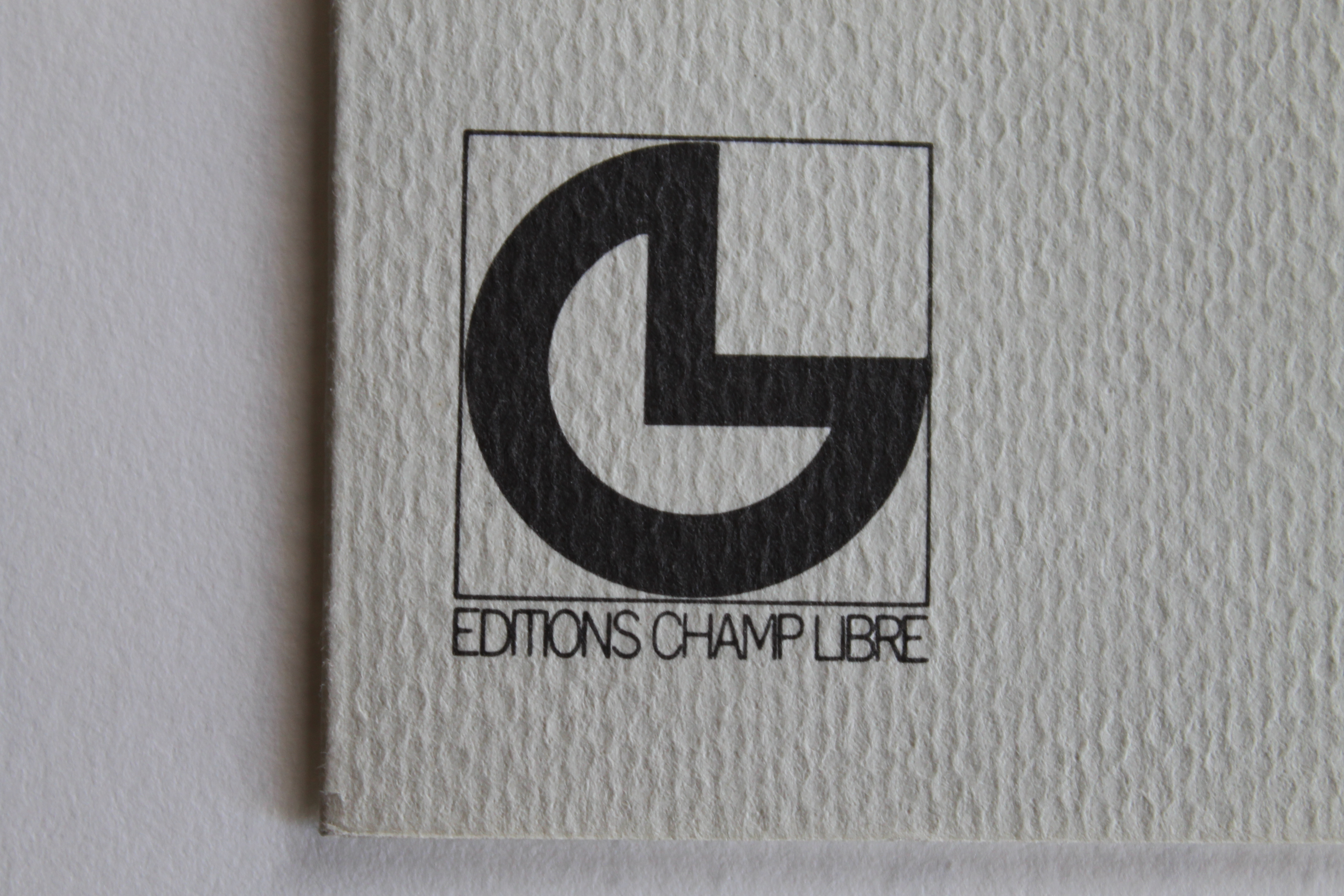
Champ Libre logo

In 1984, after the assassination of Gérard Lebovici, Champ Libre changed its name and became Éditions Gérard Lebovici as an hommage. In 1992, it became Éditions Ivrea.

Champ libre has published George Orwell, Mikhail Bakunin and Guy Debord's complete works, among others.

== Gallery ==
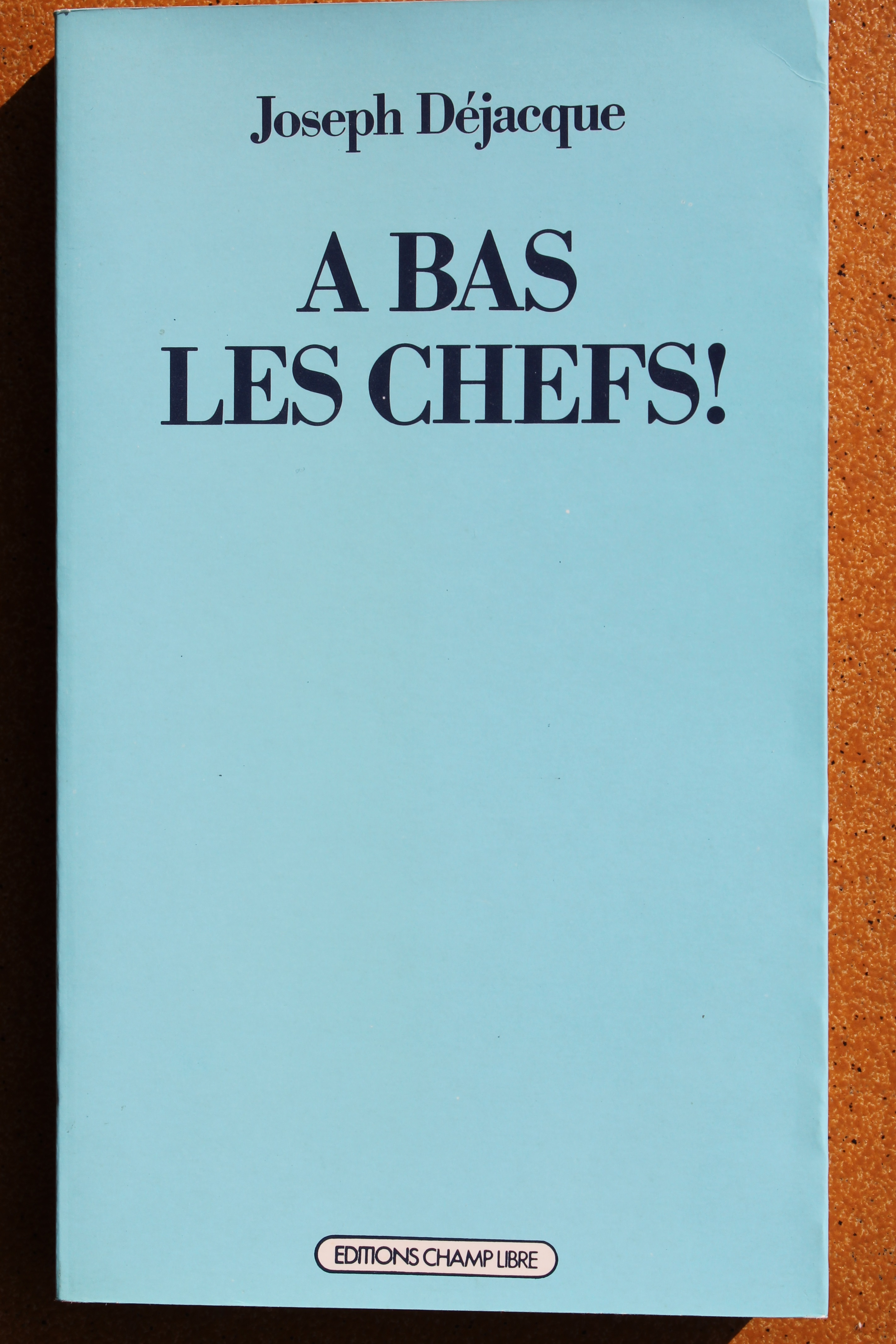
A bas les chefs ! by Joseph Déjacque

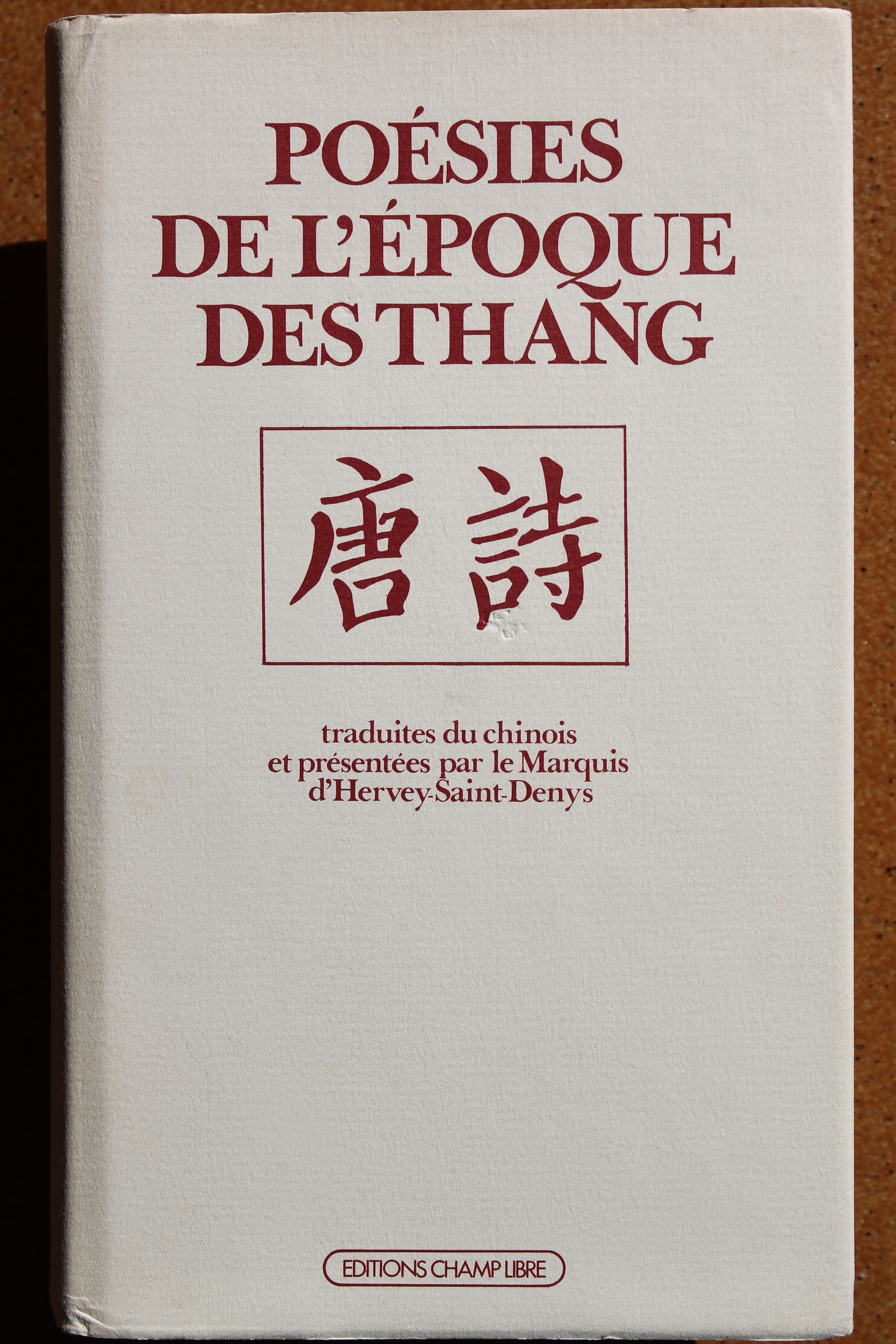
Poésies de l'époque des Thang

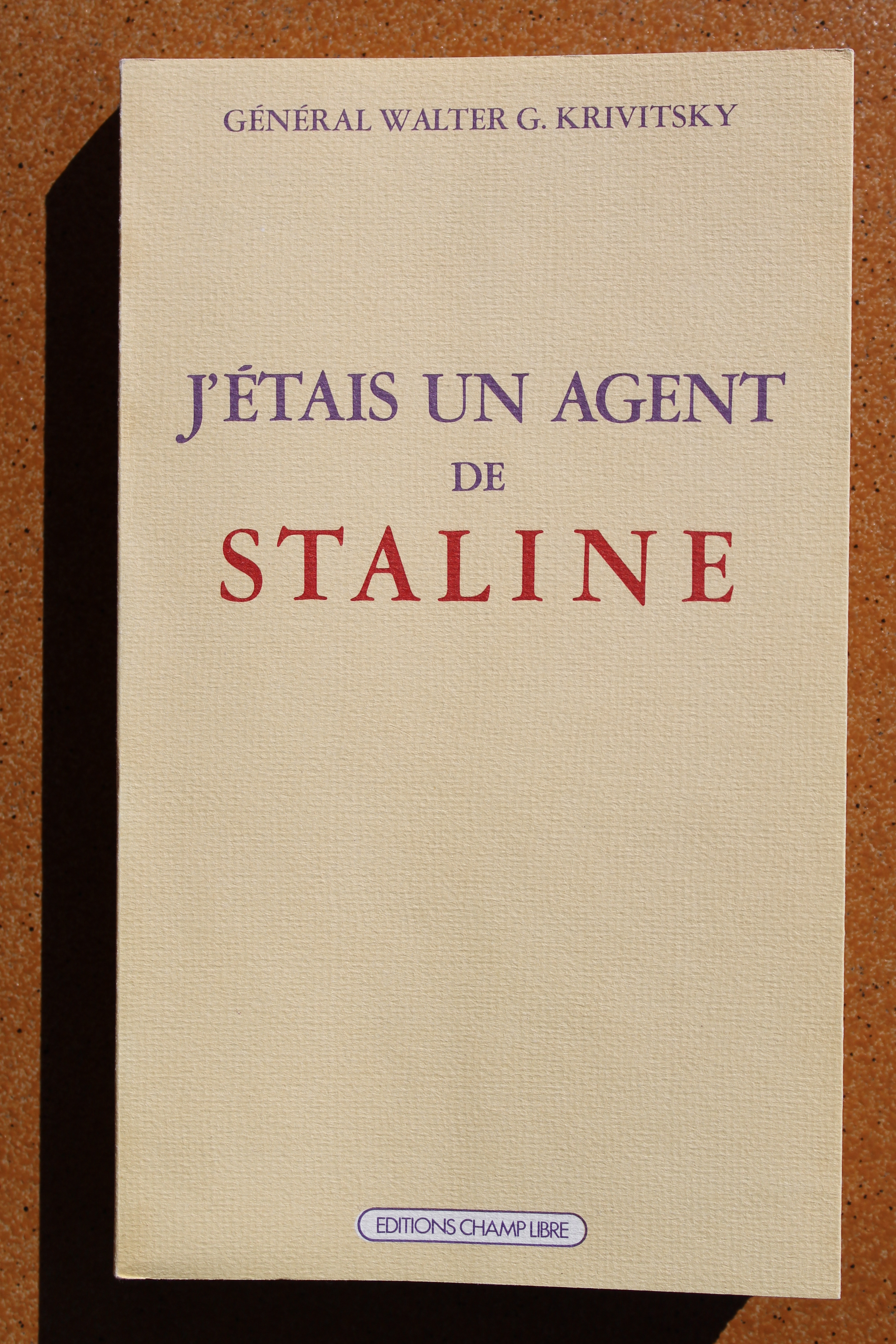
J'étais un agent de Staline by Walter G. Krivitsky

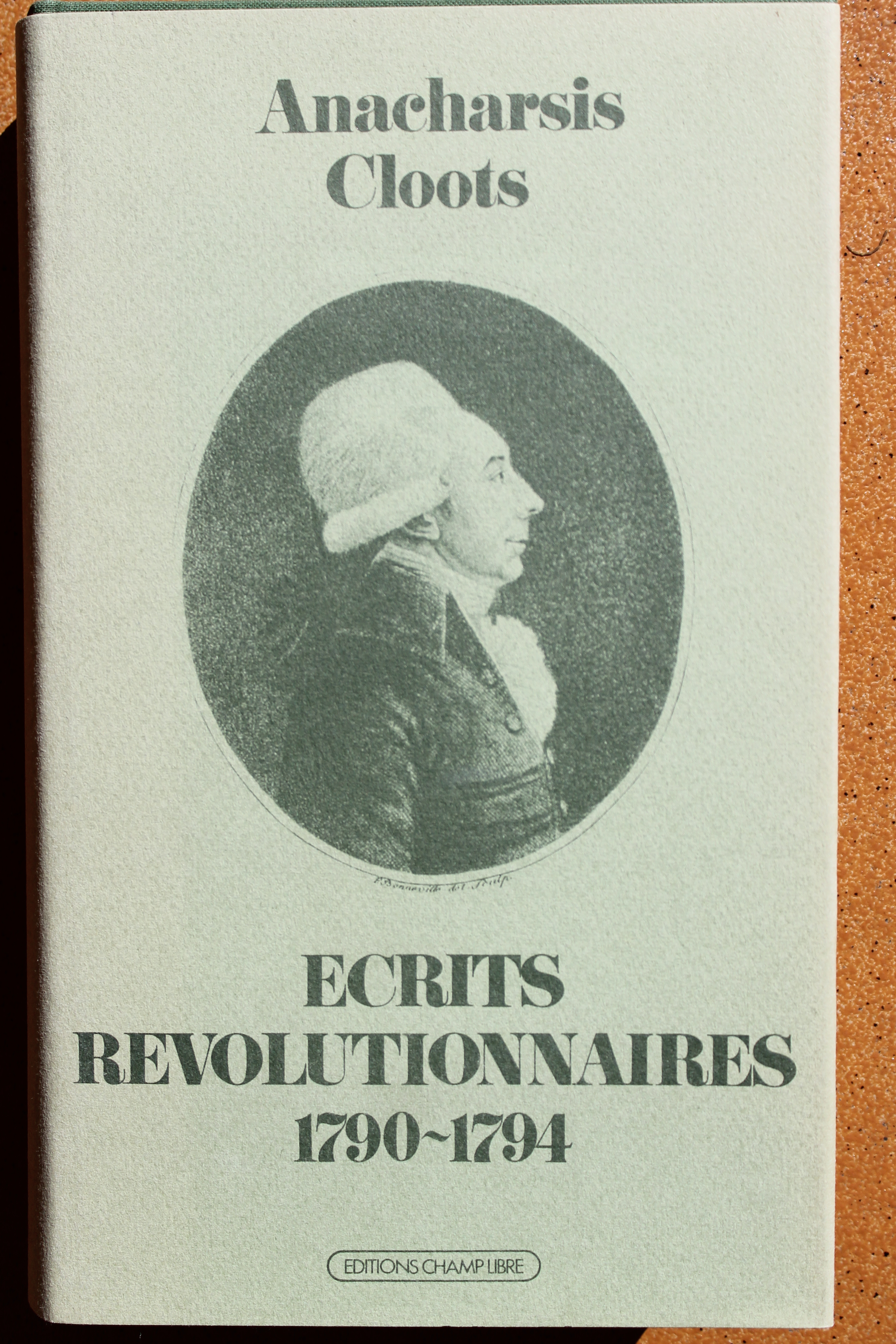
Écrits révolutionnaires by Anacharsis Cloots

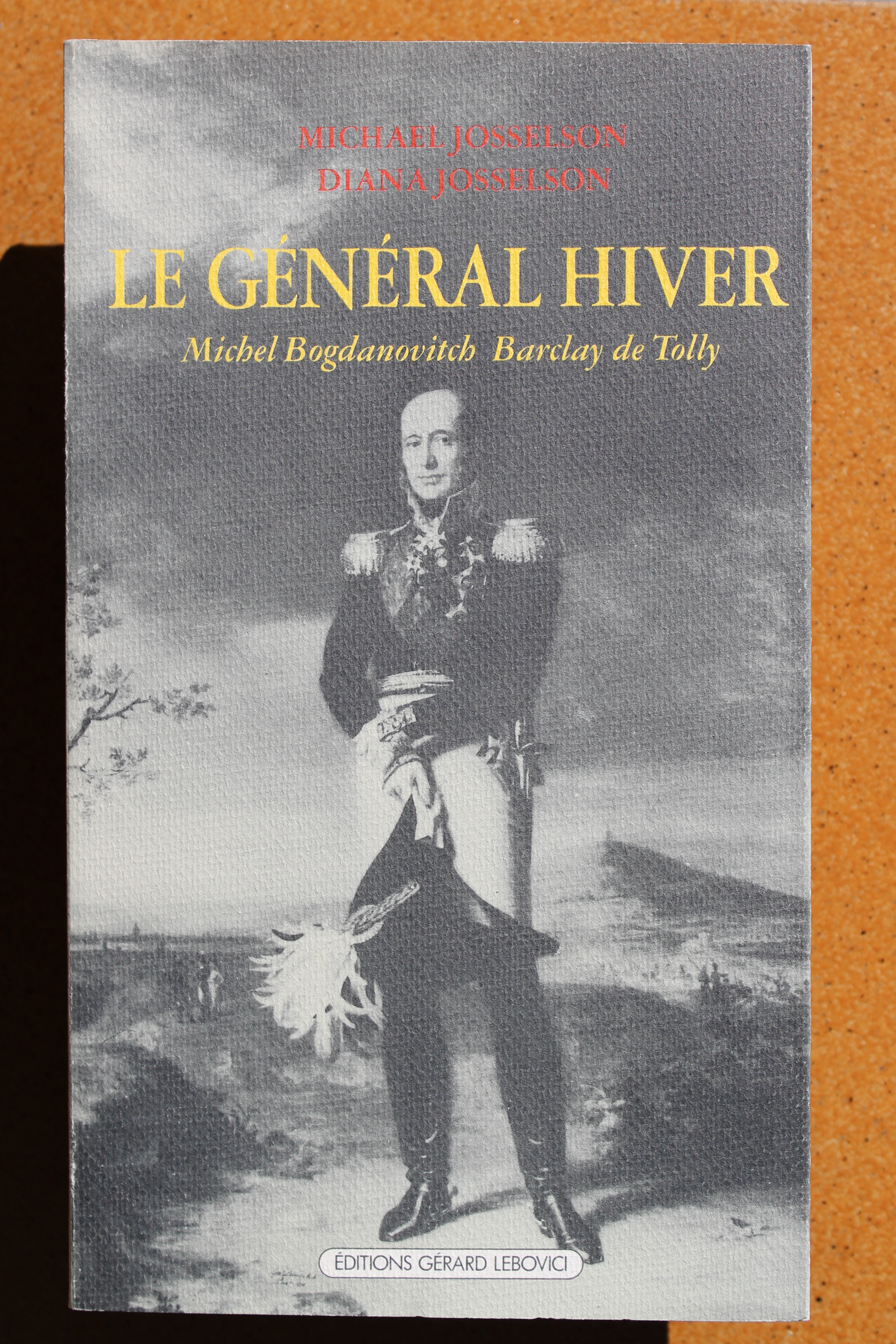
Le Général Hiver by Michael Josselson

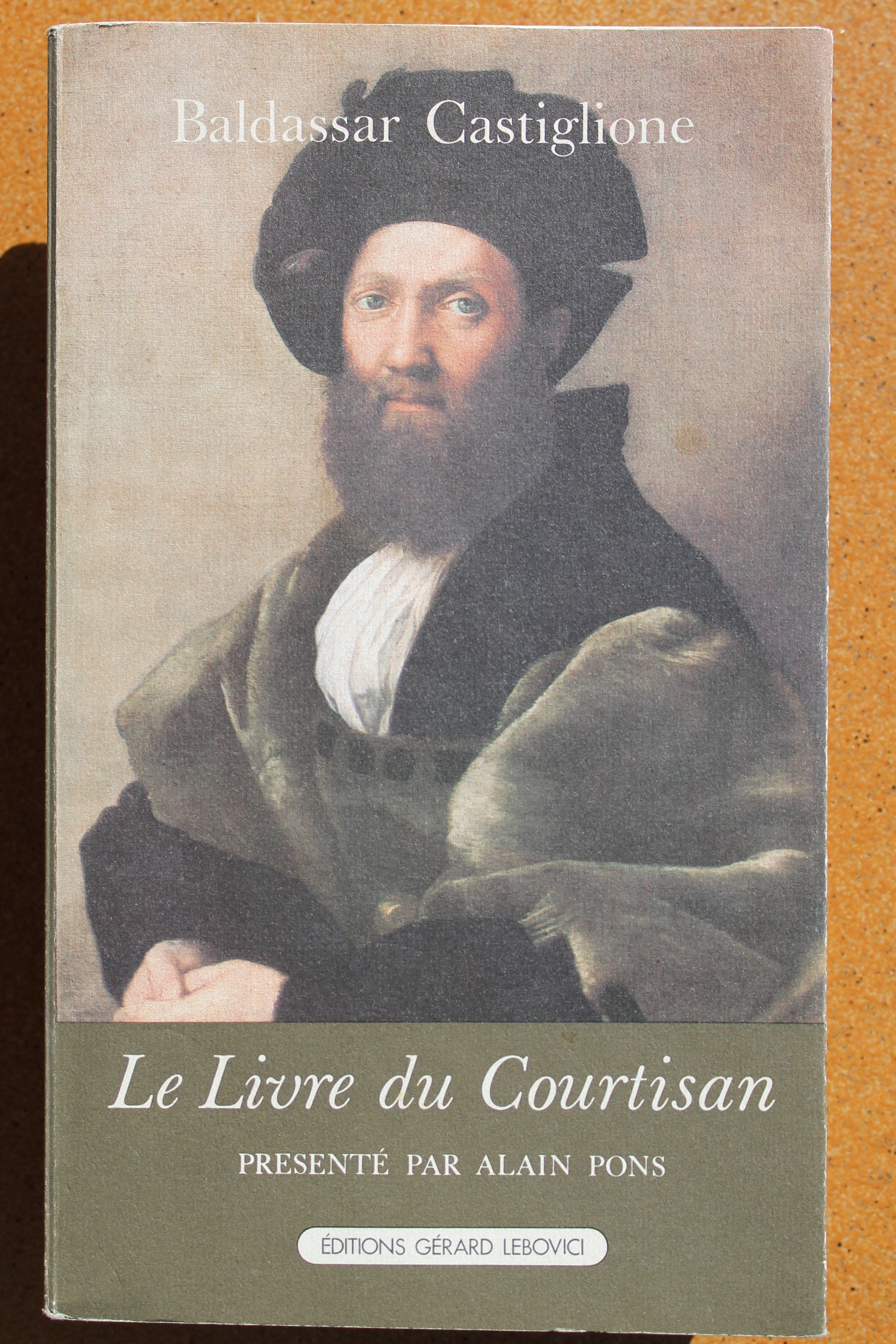
Le Livre du Courtisan by Baldassare Castiglione

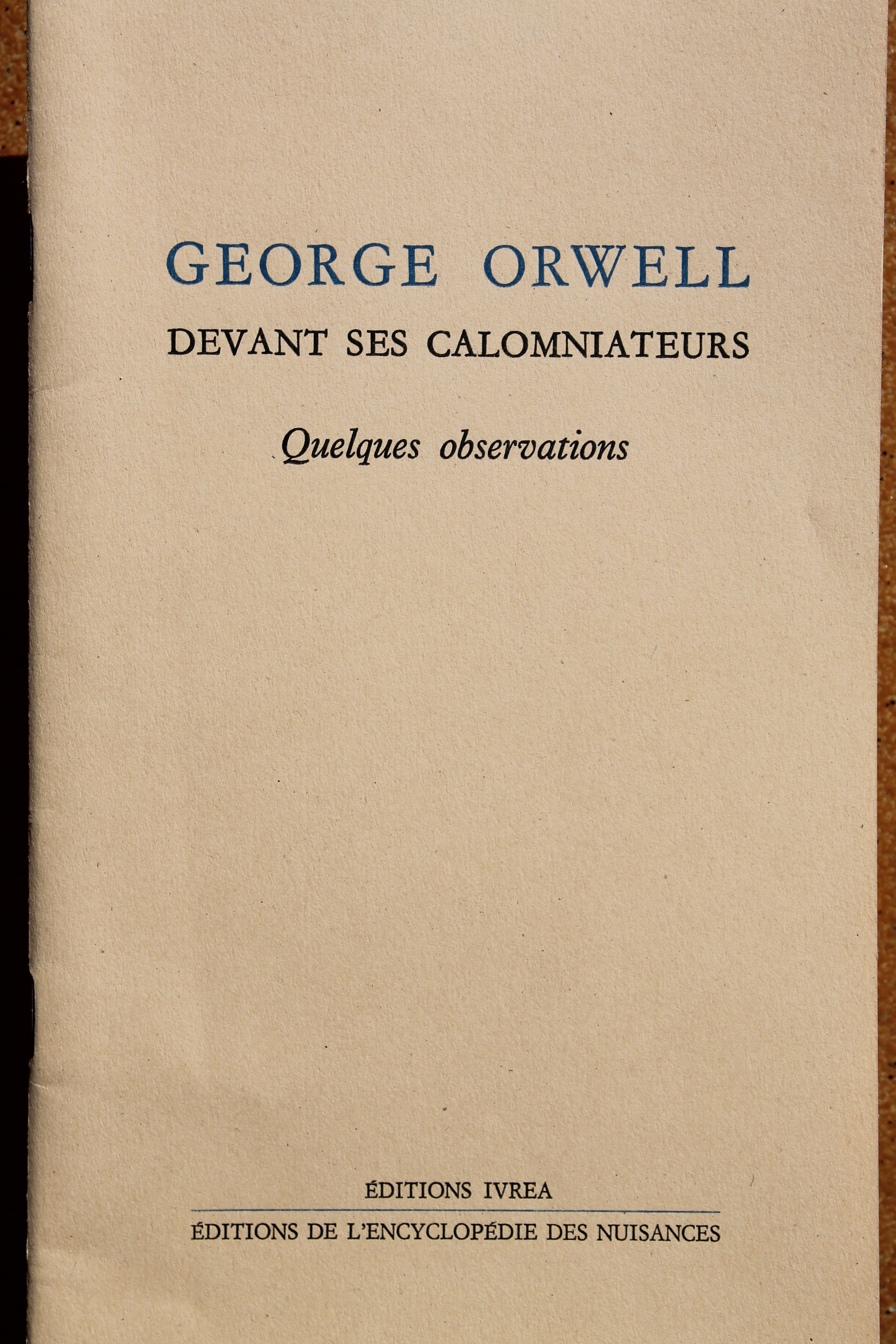
George Orwell devant ses calomniateurs, en co-édition avec l'Encyclopédie des Nuisances

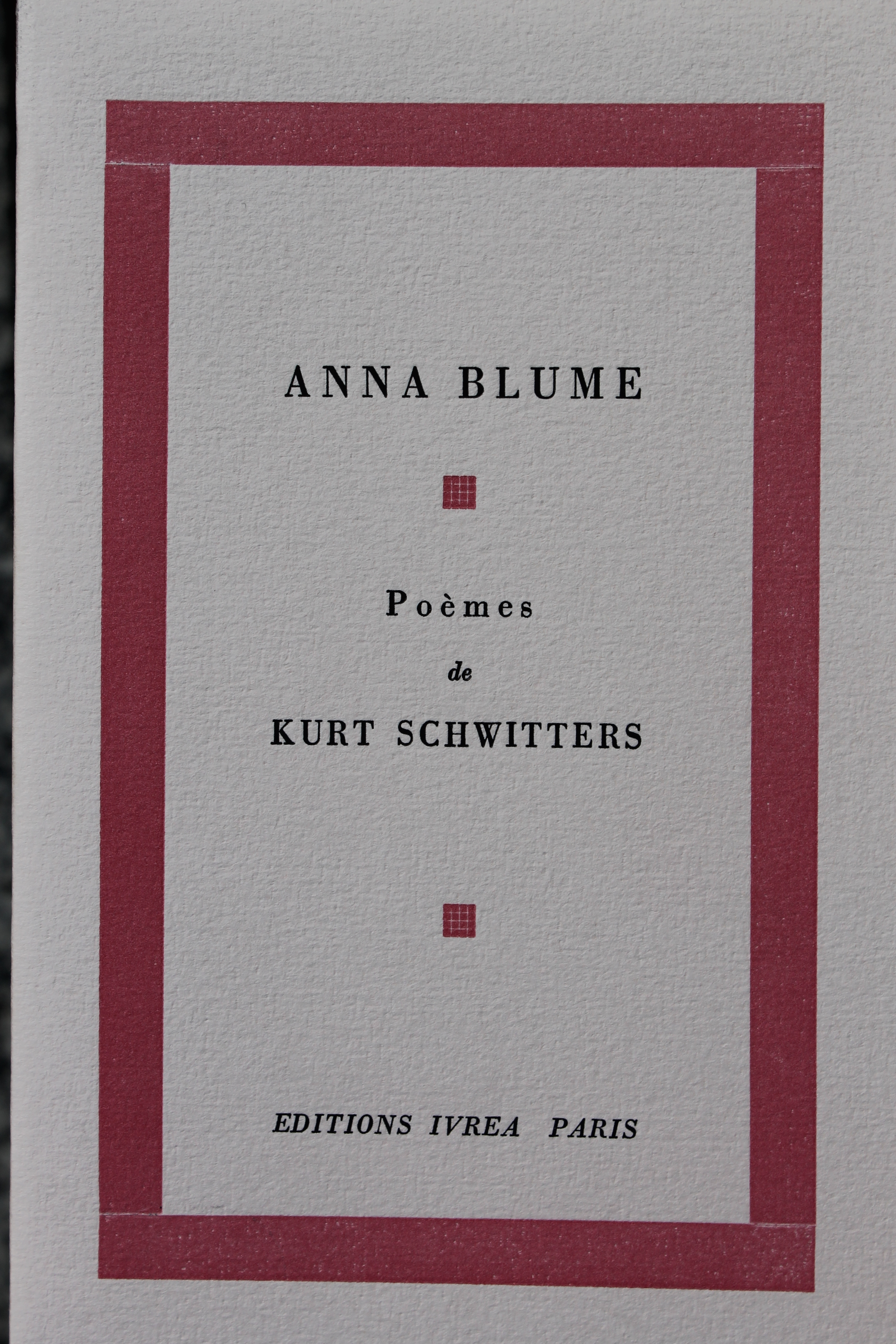
Anna Blume by Kurt Schwitters

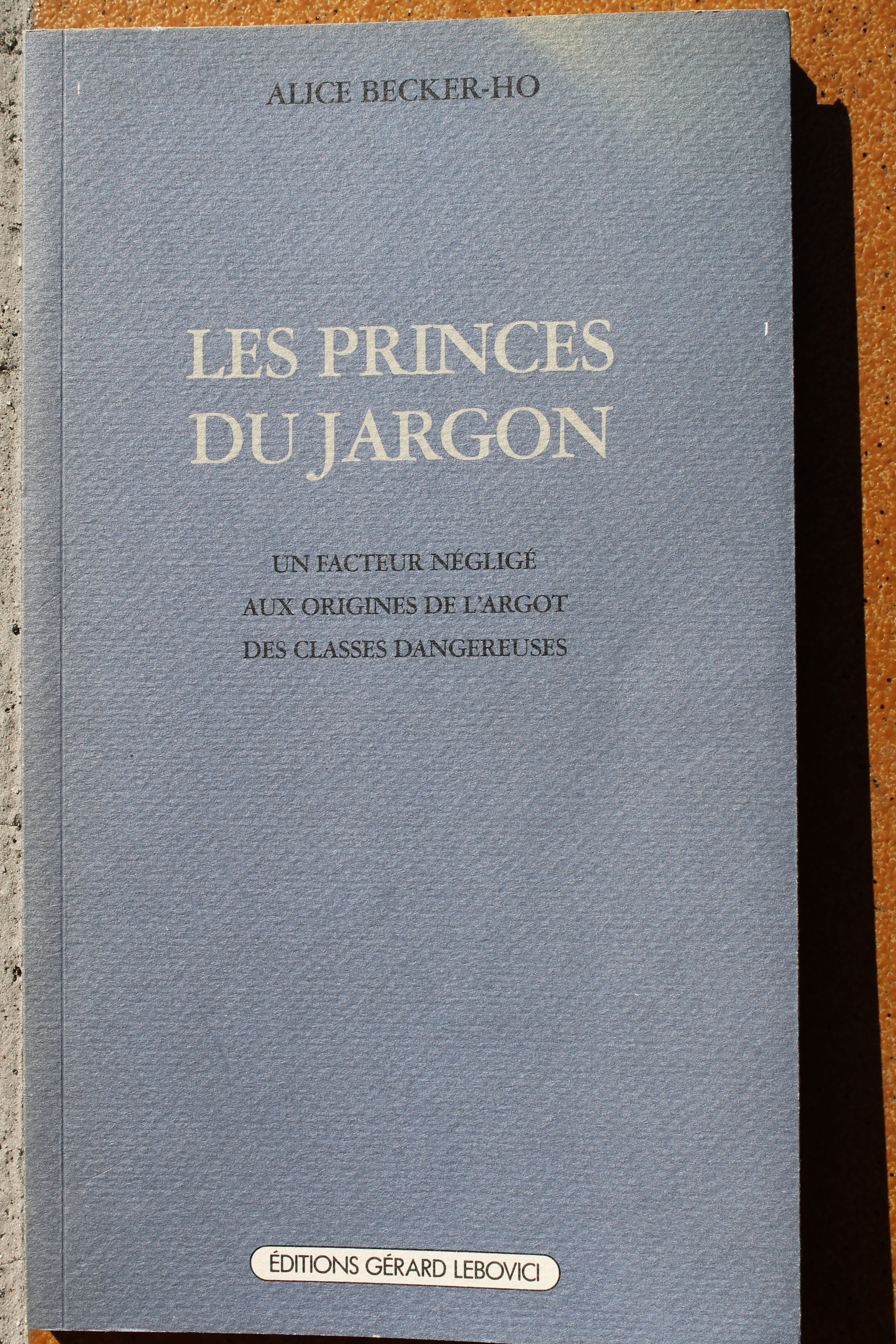
Les Princes du jargon by Alice Becker-Ho

== See also ==
- Gérard Lebovici
- Guy Debord
