= Gérard Lebovici =

French film producer (1932–1984)

Gérard Lebovici (25 August 1932 – 5 March 1984) was a French film producer, editor and impresario.

== Background ==
His mother was executed in a Nazi concentration camp during the Second World War. As he was on the verge of embarking on a promising stage career at twenty years of age, Lebovici's father died, leaving him orphaned.

Out of the necessity to ensure a source of income for himself more secure than acting, he followed his father into a menial occupation. However, passion for show-business caught up with him and in 1960, he founded a management agency with Michèle Méritz through which he represented the interests of Jean-Pierre Cassel. Subsequently, during the 1960s, he rapidly rose to prominence in show business by dint of his distinguished business acumen and an intuitive understanding of the film industry.

In 1965, he bought a management agency from Andre Bernheim which included among its clients the French actor Jean-Paul Belmondo. He gradually created an empire in the cinema industry which lasted until 1972, with his creation of Artmédia, the first pan-European agency managing a combination of writers, directors and actors. Clients included Bertrand de Labbey, Jean-Louis Livi and Serge Rousseau (who was to discover a new generation of French stars at the beginning of the 1970s, such as Patrick Dewaere, Coluche, Miou-Miou and Jacques Villeret).

Parallel to his activities in business, Gérard Lebovici acquired a sulfurous reputation through his political associations. Scarcely politicized in his youth, although of mildly Left-wing sympathies, his future wife Floriana Chiampo, as well as the events of May 1968, radicalised him. Lebovici was fascinated by the Paris uprisings and seems to have viewed them as the birth of a true revolution. He is said to have confided to his friend Gérard Guégan the idea of founding a radical publishing house which he intended to be the "Gallimard of the revolution". This idea materialised in 1969 under the name of Editions Champ Libre.

Champ Libre published a broad range of texts which reflected the ideological confusion of the time, as well as the growing influence of the American counter-culture. The defining moment of Champ Libre's development came in 1971 when Guy Debord submitted The Society of the Spectacle for publication.

In 1974, Lebovici decided to move Editions Champ Libre even more towards the fringes of the publishing industry. Debord acquired a growing influence over the choice of publication of certain titles (Clausewitz, Baltasar Gracian, Jorge Manrique, poets of the Tang dynasty, Omar Kayyam, but also Jaime Semprún, Jean-Louis Moinet and others) while the marketing policy of the house broke with normal standards: there were no paperback editions of bestsellers, and no contact with the press.

Champ Libre also republished some classic revolutionary tracts as well as writers dissenting from Stalinism (Korsch, Ciliga, Souvarine, George Orwell). Lebovici also continued his work in film, financing three films by Debord of which Society of the Spectacle was the first, in 1973.

Ten years later, Lebovici bought the Studio Cujas cinema in the Paris Latin Quarter and devoted it exclusively to showing Debord's films. The unlimited friendship between the two men, apparently belied by all lack of similarity besides their respective age, provoked jealousy even among the close associates of Lebovici. In addition to his taste for political circles of the far left, Lebovici had an extreme fascination for the culture of the criminal classes. He adopted the daughter, Sabrina, of France's "public enemy n° 1" at the time, the bank robber Jacques Mesrine, who was killed in 1979 by the French police. Pierre Guillaume approached Lebovici, in 1979, with a proposal to publish the Holocaust Denial text Le Mensonge d'Ulysse by Paul Rassinier. He refused.

== Death ==
On 7 March 1984, Gérard Lebovici was found shot dead in the front seat of his car in the basement of the Avenue Foch carpark in Paris. There was swift confirmation that he had died on 5 March from four bullets fired from behind into the back of the neck. The assassins have never been caught. His wife Floriana took control of Editions Champ Libre, renaming it Editions Gérard Lebovici and opening a bookshop of the same name in the rue Saint Sulpice, Paris. She died of cancer in February 1990 and the bookshop closed shortly after with the stock transferring to Éditions Ivrea, rue du Sommerard.

== See also ==
- List of unsolved murders (1980–1999)

== Bibliography ==
- Gérard Lebovici, Tout Sur Le Personnage, éditions Gérard Lebovici/éditions Ivrea, Paris, 1984.
- Guy Debord, Correspondance Volume 4, 1969-1972, éditions Fayard, Paris, 2004.
- Guy Debord, Correspondance Volume 5, 1973-1978, éditions Fayard, Paris, 2005.
- Guy Debord, Correspondance Volume 6, 1979-1987, éditions Fayard, Paris, 2007.
- Guy Debord, Considerations on the Assassination of Gérard Lebovici, translated by Robert Greene (Tam Tam Books, Los Angeles, 2001).
- Guy Debord, Des Contrats, (Le Temps qu'il fait, Cognac, 1995)
- Jean-Luc Douin, Les Jours Obscurs de Gérard Lebovici, (Stock, Paris, 2005)
- Various newspaper and magazine reports & articles too numerous to list from the year 1984.
- Emmanuel Loi, Les lois de l'hospitalité chez Guy Debord, article in the journal Lignes issue number 31, May 1997.
- Marie-Christine de Montbrial, Cadavres exquis dans le 7e art - Selznick, Wasserman, Lebovici, Toscan du Plantier, Jacques-Marie Laffont Editeur, 2015.
- Dominique Besnehard, Nedjma Van Egmond, Artmedia une histoire du cinéma français, L'observatoire, 2021.
- Frédéric Charpier, L'Affaire Lebovici - Autopsie d'une époque, Les Presses de la Cité, coll. intime conviction, 315 p., 2024.
