= Shams Last Stand =

Compilation album by Sham 69 and Sham Pistols
- Released: 1989; 24 August 1999 (re-release)
- Recorded: 1977–79
- Genre: Punk rock, Oi!, new wave
- Length: 47:09
- Label: Snapper

Sham 69 and Sham Pistols chronology
The Complete Sham 69 Live (1989)	Shams Last Stand (1989)	Live at the Roxy Club (1990)

Professional ratings
Review scores
Source	Rating
Allmusic	2/5 stars

Shams Last Stand is a live and compilation album by Sham 69 and Sham Pistols, was recorded in 1977–1979 at Rainbow Theatre, London, England. It was released as live album in 1989 and on 24 August 1999 as compilation album. The tracks includes "Pretty Vacant" by Sex Pistols and "White Riot" by The Clash was later featured on compilation album and was covered by Sham 69.

== Track listing ==
1. "What Have We Got" – 1:24
2. "I Don't Wanna" – 1:43
3. "They Don't Understand" – 1:54
4. "Angels with Dirty Faces" – 2:03
5. "Tell Us The Truth" – 2:44
6. "That's Life" – 2:25
7. "Rip Off" – 2:28
8. "Voices" – 2:11
9. "Borstal Breakout" – 2:57
10. "Pretty Vacant – 3:11 (Paul Cook, Steve Jones, Glen Matlock, Johnny Rotten)
11. "White Riot" – 3:26 (Mick Jones, Joe Strummer)
12. "If the Kids Are United" – 2:31
13. "What Have We Got" – 3:56
14. "Hurry Up Harry" – 2:32
15. "Hersham Boys" – 2:33
16. "Questions and Answers" – 3:27

== Personnel ==
Sham 69

- Jimmy Pursey – vocals
- Dave Guy Parsons – guitar
- Dave Tregunna – bass guitar
- Mark Cain – drums

Sham Pistols

- Jimmy Pursey – vocals
- Steve Jones – guitar
- Dave Guy Parsons – guitar
- Dave Tregunna – bass guitar
- Paul Cook – drums
- Mark Cain – backing vocals
- Ricky Goldstein – backing vocals
