= Greatest Hits Live (Sham 69 album) =

Live album by Sham 69
- Released: 2 July 2001
- Recorded: March 1991 at Clockwise Mobile Studio in Kawasaki, Kanagawa, Japan
- Genre: Punk rock, Oi!, new wave
- Length: 44:12
- Label: Cherry Red
- Producer: Caruzo Fuller

Sham 69 live and compilation albums chronology
Laced Up Boots and Corduroys (2000)	Greatest Hits Live (2001)	Sham 69 vs The Damned Greatest Hits (2001)

Professional ratings
Review scores
Source	Rating
Allmusic	3.1 stars on a 5 point scale

Greatest Hits Live is a live album by punk rock band Sham 69. It was recorded live at Clockwise Mobile Studio in Kawasaki, Kanagawa, Japan in March 1991, and released in 2001 on Cherry Red Records.

== Track listing ==
All tracks are written by Jimmy Pursey and Dave Parsons.

No.	Title	Writer(s)	Length
1.	"What Have We Got"	Parsons, Pursey	2:02
2.	"Angels with Dirty Faces"		1:50
3.	"You're a Better Man Than I"	Mike Hugg, Brian Hugg, Manfred Mann	3:06
4.	"Tell the Children"		3:17
5.	"Poor Cow"		3:05
6.	"How the West Was Won"		3:19
7.	"Caroline's Suitcase"		4:05
8.	"Borstal Breakout"		2:37
9.	"Vision Power"	Jimmy Pursey	4:04
10.	"If the Kids Are United"		5:04
11.	"Money"		3:14
12.	"Hersham Boys"		3:19
13.	"Rip and Tear"		5:10

== Personnel ==
=== Sham 69 ===
- Jimmy Pursey – lead vocals
- Dave Parsons – guitar
- Ian Whitewood – drums
- Andy Prince – bass

=== Additional personnel ===
- Linda Paganelli – saxophone
- Patricia Kuckelmann – keyboards
- Makoto Takahashi – engineer
- Caruzo Fuller – executive producer
