= Live in Japan (Sham 69 album) =

Live album by Sham 69
- Released: 1993 (US); 11 March 1994 (UK)
- Recorded: March 1991 at Clockwise Mobile Studio in Kawasaki, Kanagawa, Japan
- Genre: Punk rock, Oi!, new wave
- Label: Dojo (UK); Creativeman Disc (US)

Sham 69 live and compilation albums chronology
BBC Radio 1 Live in Concert (1993)	Live in Japan (1993)	The Best of & Rest of Sham 69 Live (1994)

Professional ratings
Review scores
Source	Rating
Allmusic	2/5 stars

Live in Japan is a live album by punk rock band Sham 69, recorded at Clockwise Mobile Studio in Kawasaki, Kanagawa, Japan in March 1991 and released in 1994 (see 1994 in music).

== Track listing ==
1. "What Have You Got?"
2. "Angels with Dirty Faces"
3. "You're a Better Man Than I" (Brian Hugg) (The Yardbirds/Manfred Mann Chapter Three cover)
4. "Tell the Children"
5. "Poor Cow"
6. "How The West Was Won"
7. "Caroline's Suitcase"
8. "Borstal Breakout"
9. "Vision & Power"
10. "If the Kids Are United"
11. "Money"
12. "Hersham Boys"
13. "Rip and Tear"
