= The Best of & Rest of Sham 69 Live =

The Best of & Rest of Sham 69 (Live)

Live album by Sham 69
- Released: 1989; 15 December 1994 (re-release)
- Genre: Punk rock, Oi!, new wave
- Length: 44:25
- Label: Receiver, Action Replay Records

Sham 69 live and compilation albums chronology
Live in Japan (1994)	The Best of & Rest of Sham 69 (Live) (1989)	The Punk Singles Collection 1977-80 (1998)

Professional ratings
Review scores
Source	Rating
Allmusic	2/5 stars

The Best of & Rest of Sham 69 Live is live and compilation album by punk rock band Sham 69. It was released as a compilation album in 1989 and live album in 1994 (see 1989 in music).

== Track listing ==
1. "Intro" - 1:15
2. "What Have We Got" - 1:26
3. "Red London" - 2:35
4. "Voices" - 2:49
5. "Angels with Dirty Faces" - 3:08
6. "Questions and Answers" - 3:21
7. "That's Life" - 3:35
8. "Borstal Breakout" - 2:35
9. "Everybody's Innocent" - 2:28
10. "Joey's on the Street" - 3:10
11. "They Don't Understand" - 2:15
12. "Tell Us The Truth" - 2:36
13. "Hersham Boys" - 5:08
14. "James Dean" - 2:43
15. "White Riot" - 2:05 (The Clash cover)
16. "If the Kids Are United" - 3:16
