= Live and Loud!! Volume 2 =

Live album by Sham 69
- Released: 1988
- Recorded: 1977–79
- Genre: Punk rock, Oi!, new wave
- Label: Link

Sham 69 chronology
Live and Loud!! (1987)	Live and Loud!! Volume 2 (1988)	Volunteer (1988)

Professional ratings
Review scores
Source	Rating
Allmusic	3/5 stars

Live and Loud!! Volume 2 is a second live album by the punk rock band Sham 69, recorded in 1977-1979 and released in 1988 (see 1988 in music).

== Track listing ==
1. "What Have We Got" - 3:36
2. "I Don't Wanna" - 1:52
3. "Rip Off" - 1:40
4. "Angels with Dirty Faces" - 2:35
5. "Everybody's Innocent" - 2:33
6. "Ulster" - 2:51
7. "They Don't Understand" - 1:42
8. "Hurry Up Harry" - 3:53
9. "Voices"
10. "Who Gives a Damn" - 3:22
11. "Daytripper" - 3:41
12. "Borstal Breakout" - 2:12
13. "Hersham Boys" - 3:25
14. "If the Kids Are United - 3:14
