= Green Eggs & Sham =

Live album by Sham 69
- Released: 3 August 1999
- Genre: Punk rock, Oi!
- Length: 36:36
- Label: Big Ear Music

Sham 69 live and compilation albums chronology
The Punk Singles Collection 1977-80 (1998)	Green Eggs & Sham (1999)	Live in Italy (1999)

Professional ratings
Review scores
Source	Rating
Allmusic	2/5 stars

Green Eggs & Sham is a live album by punk rock band Sham 69, released in 1999 (see 1999 in music). The album title itself is a parody of Green Eggs and Ham by Dr. Seuss.

== Track listing ==
1. "Rip Off" - 1:22
2. "Ulster" - 2:54
3. "Borstal Breakout" - 2:13
4. "Angels with Dirty Faces" - 2:32
5. "Tell Us The Truth" - 2:46
6. "Day Tripper" - 3:28 (John Lennon, Paul McCartney)
7. "Questions and Answers - 3:28
8. "If the Kids Are United" - 3:31
9. "What Have We Got" - 1:30
10. "Red London" - 2:26
11. "That's Life" - 2:23
12. "Everybody's Innocent" - 2:00
13. "Hersham Boys" - 3:11
14. "Joey's on the Street" - 2:52
