= BBC Radio 1 Live in Concert (Sham 69 album) =

Live album by Sham 69
- Released: 8 November 1993
- Recorded: 21 February 1979
- Venues: Paris Theatre, London, England, UK
- Genres: Punk rock, Oi!, new wave
- Length: 32:16
- Label: Windsong International
- Producer: Chris Lycett

Sham 69 live and compilation albums chronology
| Kings & Queens (1993) | BBC Radio 1 Live in Concert (1993) | Live in Japan (1994) |

Professional ratings
Review scores
| Source | Rating |
|---|---|
| Allmusic | 4/5 stars |

BBC Radio 1 Live in Concert is a 1993 live album by Sham 69. It was recorded by the BBC during the band's concert at the Paris Theatre in London on 21 February 1979 and released as a live album in 1993.

== Track listing ==
1. "Everybody's Innocent" - 2:33
2. "Angels with Dirty Faces" - 3:26
3. "Anyway Who Gives An Damn" - 3:55
4. "That's Life" - 2:33
5. "Tell Us The Truth" - 3:14
6. "Borstal Breakout" - 3:38
7. "Day Tripper" - 4:01 (John Lennon, Paul McCartney)
8. "Questions and Answers - 4:35
9. "If the Kids Are United" - 4:16

== Personnel ==
- Dave Tregunna - bass guitar
- Jimmy Pursey - vocals
- Mark Cain - drums
- Dave Guy Parsons - guitar
