= Live in Italy (Sham 69 album) =

Live album by Sham 69
- Released: 1 October 1999
- Recorded: 1996
- Genre: Punk rock, Oi!
- Length: 48:39
- Label: Castle

Sham 69 live and compilation albums chronology
Green Eggs & Sham (1999)	Live in Italy (1999)	Laced Up Boots and Corduroys (2000)

Professional ratings
Review scores
Source	Rating
Allmusic	2.3/3 stars

Live in Italy is a live album by punk rock band Sham 69, recorded at the Live in Bo Festival, Italy in summer of 1996 and was released on 1 October 1999 (see 1999 in music).

== Track listing ==
1. "Angels with Dirty Faces" - 1:44
2. "Questions and Answers" - 3:17
3. "Ulster Boy" - 2:41
4. "Tell Us The Truth" - 2:23
5. "Loud Mouth" - 2:17
6. "Geoffrey Thomas" - 2:43
7. "Trainspotter" - 2:30
8. "Studenthead" - 3:35
9. "14 Years" - 3:07
10. "Hurry Up Harry" - 2:26
11. "Money" - 2:08
12. "Poor Cow" - 2:34
13. "No Entry" - 2:31
14. "What Have We Got" - 2:04
15. "If the Kids Are United" - 3:53
16. "Blackpool" - 2:27
17. "Hersham Boys - 3:00
18. "Borstal Breakout - 3:17
