= At the BBC (Sham 69 album) =

Live album by Sham 69
- Released: 30 March 2003
- Recorded: 28 November 1977 at Maida Vale Studios in London and 21 February 1979 at Paris Theatre, London, England, UK
- Genre: Punk rock
- Length: 37:26
- Label: Strange Fruit
- Producer: Tony Wilson, Chris Lycett

Sham 69 live and compilations chronology
The Very Best of the Hersham Boys (2002)	At the BBC (2003)	Cockney Cowboys: The Very Best of Sham 69 (2003)

Professional ratings
Review scores
Source	Rating
Allmusic	4.5/5 stars

At the BBC is a collection of English punk rock band Sham 69 tracks that were performed in session at the BBC and was released in 2003. Tracks 1 to 5 recorded for John Peel at the Maida Vale Studios, London 28 November 1977 and first transmitted on 6 December 1977. Other tracks were recorded in concert at the Paris Theatre, London on 21 February 1979.

== Track listing ==
1. "Borstal Breakout" - 2:09
2. "Hey Little Rich Boy" - 1:45
3. "They Don't Understand" - 1:52
4. "Rip Off" - 1:40
5. "What Have We Got?" - 1:54
6. "Everybody's Innocent" - 2:25
7. "Angels with Dirty Faces" - 2:32
8. "Anyway Who Gives a Damn?" - 3:30
9. "That's Life" - 2:20
10. "Day Tripper" - 3:33
11. "Questions and Answers" - 3:32
12. "If the Kids Are United" - 4:14
