= Live at CBGB's (Sham 69 album) =

Live album by Sham 69
- Released: 1991 (as Live at CBGB's 1988); 1998 (re-release)
- Recorded: November 1988
- Genre: Punk rock, Oi!, new wave, hardcore punk
- Length: 46:42
- Label: Dojo, Link

Sham 69 chronology
Live at the Roxy Club (1990)	Live at CBGB's (1991)	BBC Radio 1 Live in Concert (1993)

Professional ratings
Review scores
Source	Rating
Allmusic	2.3 stars on a 5 point scale

Live at CBGB's also known as Live at CBGB's 1988 is the live album by the punk rock band Sham 69, was recorded in November 1988 and released in 1991 (see 1991 in music).

== Track listing ==
1. "How the Was Won" - 2:59
2. "Tell Us The Truth" - 2:37
3. "Wallpaper Song" - 4:25
4. "Rip and Tear" - 4:03
5. "Questions and Answers" - 3:50
6. "Caroline's Suitcase" - 3:41
7. "Vision and the Power" - 3:58
8. "The Bastard Club" - 5:45
9. "Borstal Breakout" - 3:32
10. "What Have We Got" - 2:04
11. "As Black as Sheep" - 5:15
12. "If the Kids Are United" - 4:33
