= The Adventures of the Hersham Boys =

Studio album by Sham 69
- Released: September 1979
- Genres: Punk rock, Oi!
- Label: Polydor
- Producers: Jimmy Pursey, Peter Wilson

Sham 69 chronology
That's Life (1978)	The Adventures of the Hersham Boys (1979)	The Game (1980)

The Adventures of the Hersham Boys is an album by punk band Sham 69, released in 1979. It is their most successful album, peaking at No. 8 in the UK.

== Reception ==
Professional ratings
Review scores
Source	Rating
AllMusic	4/5 stars
The Encyclopedia of Popular Music	3/5 stars
Music Week	4/4 stars

It was not universally well received, with David Hepworth of Smash Hits describing it as "a tired, hollow effort struggling between weary attempts at rabble-rousing and blush-making pseudo-Springsteen 'street' songs that reek of desperation and contract fulfilling... As empty and self-satisfied a record as anything they supposedly set out to replace." Trouser Press called it "a break with the punk scene, but no less aggressive than usual."

== Track listing ==
All songs by Jimmy Pursey and Dave Parsons unless noted

1. "Money" - 3:13
2. "Fly Dark Angel" - 3:03
3. "Joey's on the Street Again" - 3:04
4. "Cold Blue in the Night" - 2:47 (Dave "Kermit" Tregunna)
5. "You're a Better Man Than I" - 3:10 (Mike Hugg) (Yardbirds/Manfred Mann Chapter Three cover)
6. "Hersham Boys" - 4:46
7. "Lost on Highway 46" - 3:35
8. "Voices" - 2:52 (Ricky Goldstein, Pursey)
9. "Questions and Answers" - 3:14
10. "What Have We Got" (Live) - 2:54

CD reissue bonus tracks

1. "Questions and Answers" (Single Version) - 3:18
2. "I Gotta Survive" - 1:31
3. "With a Little Help from My Friends" - 2:36 (John Lennon, Paul McCartney) (The Beatles cover)
4. "Hersham Boys" (7" Version) - 3:25
5. "I Don't Wanna" (Live) - 2:06
6. "Rip Off" (Live) - 2:43
7. "I'm a Man, I'm a Boy" (Live) - 2:10
8. "Tell Us the Truth" (Live) - 2:06
9. "Borstal Breakout" (12" Single Version) - 8:25
10. "If the Kids Are United" (12" Single Version) - 16:20
- Tracks 11–13 from "Questions and Answers" single, March 1979
- Tracks 14–18 from "Hersham Boys" single, August 1979
- Tracks 19 and 20 released as 12" with initial copies of The Adventures of the Hersham Boys

== Personnel ==
Sham 69

- Jimmy Pursey – vocals, producer
- Dave Parsons – guitar
- Dave Tregunna – bass
- Ricky Goldstein – drums
- Mark "Doidie" Cain – drums; vocals on "With a Little Help from My Friends" (departing Sham 69 soon after the completion)

Technical

- Peter Wilson – producer
- Jo Mirowski – art direction, design
- Peter Lavery – photography
- Tim Turan – mastering
- Brett Ewins – illustrations

== Charts ==
Chart performance
Chart (2026)	Peak position
Croatian International Albums (HDU)	19
