= Kings & Queens (Sham 69 album) =

Compilation album by Sham 69
- Released: 1993
- Genre: Punk rock, Oi!
- Label: Dojo Records

Sham 69 chronology
Information Libre (1991)	Kings & Queens (1993)	Soapy Water and Mister Marmalade (1995)

Professional ratings
Review scores
Source	Rating
Allmusic	3/5 stars

Kings & Queens is an album by punk band Sham 69, released in 1993 (see 1993 in music). It contains two new tracks; the remaining tiles are re-recordings of 70s material.

== Track listing ==
All songs by Jimmy Pursey and Dave Parsons unless noted

1. "Action Time Vision" - 2:43 (Alex Fergusson, Mark Perry)
2. "I Don't Wanna" - 1:42
3. "Ulster Boy" - 2:53
4. "They Don't Understand" - 1:48
5. "Tell Us the Truth" - 2:04
6. "Borstal Breakout" - 2:00
7. "Family Life" - 1:54
8. "If the Kids Are United" - 3:37
9. "Hurry Up Harry" - 3:03
10. "Reggae Giro" - 4:35
