= Live and Loud!! (Sham 69 album) =

Live album by Sham 69
- Released: 9 February 1987
- Recorded: 1979
- Genre: Punk rock, Oi!
- Label: Link

Sham 69 chronology
The First, the Best and the Last (1980)	Live and Loud!! (1987)	Live and Loud!! Volume 2 (1988)

Professional ratings
Review scores
Source	Rating
AllMusic	4/5 stars

Live and Loud!! is the first live album by the punk band Sham 69, recorded in 1979 and released in 1987 (see 1987 in music).

== Track listing ==
1. "Angels with Dirty Faces"
2. "Tell Us the Truth"
3. "Questions and Answers
4. "Joey's on the Street"
5. "Borstal Breakout"
6. "Red London"
7. "Hersham Boys"
8. "That's Life"
9. "You're a Better Man than I"
10. "Money"
11. "Poor Cow"
12. "White Riot"
13. "They Don't Understand"
14. "If the Kids Are United"
15. "Voices" (bonus track)
16. "Give a Dog a Bone" (bonus track)
17. "Lost On Highway 46" (bonus track)
18. "Day Tripper" (bonus track)
19. "The Stockholm Kids Are Innocent" (bonus track)
