= That's Life (Sham 69 album) =

Studio album by Sham 69
- Released: November 1978
- Studios: Startling Sounds, Ascot, Berkshire
- Genres: Punk rock; Oi!
- Length: 38:14
- Label: Polydor
- Producers: Jimmy Pursey; Peter Wilson

Sham 69 chronology
Tell Us the Truth (1978)	That's Life (1978)	The Adventures of the Hersham Boys (1979)

Professional ratings
Review scores
Source	Rating
AllMusic	4/5 stars
Q	4/5 stars

That's Life is the second album by English punk rock band Sham 69, released in 1978.

That's Life peaked at number 27 on the UK Albums Chart. The album includes the singles "Hurry Up Harry" and "Angels with Dirty Faces", which reached numbers 10 and 19 respectively on the UK Singles Chart. In 1989, That's Life and the band's debut album Tell Us the Truth were re-released as a double LP.

== Track listing ==
All tracks composed by Jimmy Pursey and Dave Parsons, except where indicated

1. "Leave Me Alone"
2. "Who Gives a Damn"
3. "Everybody's Right Everybody's Wrong"
4. "That's Life"
5. "Win or Lose"
6. "Hurry Up Harry"
7. "Evil Way"
8. "Reggae Pick Up Part 1" (Pursey)
9. "Sunday Morning Nightmare"
10. "Reggae Pick Up Part 2" (Pursey)
11. "Angels with Dirty Faces"
12. "Is This Me or Is This You" (Parsons, Dave Tregunna, Mark Cain)
  CD reissue bonus tracks
13. "The Cockney Kids Are Innocent"
14. "If the Kids Are United"
15. "No Entry"

== Personnel ==
Sham 69

- Jimmy Pursey – vocals, production, cover design, photography, liner notes
- Dave Parsons – guitars, liner notes
- Dave Tregunna – bass
- Mark "Dodie" Cain – drums

Technical

- Peter Wilson – production, engineer
- Grant Fleming – voice between tracks
- Brian Burrows – remixing
- Steve Hammonds – project coordinator
- Alwyn Clayden – package design
- Shane Baldwin – liner notes
- Barry Plummer – photography

== Charts ==
Chart (1978–79)	Peak position
UK Albums (Official Charts)	27
