= The Punk Singles Collection 1977–80 =

Compilation album by Sham 69
- Released: 3 March 1998
- Recorded: 1977–1980
- Genre: Punk rock
- Label: Cleopatra

Sham 69 chronology
The A Files (1997)	The Punk Singles Collection 1977–80 (1998)	Direct Action: Day 21 (2001)

Captain Oi! cover

The Punk Singles Collection 1977–80 is a compilation album by Sham 69. It was originally released by Cleopatra in 1998. It features all of the singles, with their b-sides (except live tracks), released by the band from their start to their first break-up. It was re-released in 2006 by Captain Oi!, this time featuring the four missing live b-sides.

When this album was released, many of the songs made their CD debut. However, all of the tracks were later featured on re-releases of the band's first four albums.

== Track listing ==
All songs written by Jimmy Pursey, Dave Parsons unless otherwise noted

1. "I Don't Wanna"
2. "Ulster"
3. "Red London" (Parsons)
4. "What Have We Got"
5. "Borstal Breakout"
6. "Hey Little Rich Boy"
7. "Angels with Dirty Faces"
8. "The Cockney Kids Are Innocent"
9. "If the Kids Are United"
10. "Sunday Morning Nightmare"
11. "Hurry Up Harry"
12. "No Entry"
13. "Questions and Answers"
14. "I Gotta Survive"
15. "With a Little Help from My Friends" (Paul McCartney, John Lennon)
16. "Hersham Boys (7" Version)"
17. "I Don't Wanna (Live)"
18. "Rip Off (Live)"
19. "I'm A Man I'm A Boy (Live)"
20. "Tell Us The Truth (Live)"
21. "You're a Better Man Than I" (Brian Hugg, Mike Hugg)
22. "Give a Dog a Bone" (Pursey, Parsons, Ricky Goldstein, Dave Treganna)
23. "Tell The Children"
24. "Jack" (Pursey)
25. "Unite and Win"
26. "I'm a Man" (Parsons)

Note: Tracks 17 to 20 only appear on the Captain Oi! re-issue.

=== Track origins ===
- Tracks 1–3 originally appeared on "I Don't Wanna"
- Tracks 5 and 6 originally appeared on "Borstal Breakout"
- Tracks 7 and 8 originally appeared on "Angels with Dirty Faces"
- Tracks 9 and 10 originally appeared on "If the Kids Are United"
- Tracks 11 and 12 originally appeared on "Hurry Up Harry
- Tracks 13–15 originally appeared on "Questions and Answers"
- Tracks 16 to 20 originally appeared on "Hersham Boys"
- Tracks 21 and 22 originally appeared on "You're a Better Man Than I"
- Tracks 23 and 24 originally appeared on "Tell the Children"
- Tracks 25 and 26 originally appeared on "Unite and Win"

== Personnel ==
=== Sham 69 ===
- Jimmy Pursey – vocals
- Dave Parsons – guitar
- Albie Slider – bass
- Dave Tregunna – bass
- Mark Cain – drums
- Ricky Goldstein – drums
