= Hollywood Hero =

Studio album by Sham 69
- Released: 21 August 2007
- Genre: Punk rock
- Length: 37:00
- Label: SOS Records
- Producer: Dave Parsons, Ian Whitewood

Sham 69 chronology
| Direct Action: Day 21 (2001) | Hollywood Hero (2007) | Who Killed Joe Public (2010) |

UK version

Professional ratings
Review scores
| Source | Rating |
|---|---|
| AllMusic | 2/5 stars |

Hollywood Hero, released as Western Culture in the UK, is an album by punk band Sham 69. It was released in the US on August 21, 2007, by SOS Records and in the UK on November 26, 2007, by Bad Dog Records. This is the first Sham 69 album without the original vocalist Jimmy Pursey.

== Track listing ==
All songs by Jimmy Pursey and Dave Parsons unless noted

1. "Asbo Sports Day" - 2:51
2. "No Apologies" - 3:17
3. "Western Culture" - 2:26
4. "Medic" - 2:53
5. "Here Come the Lies" - 2:46
6. "I Want Glory" - 4:25 (Edwards, Parsons)
7. "Hollywood Hero" - 2:17
8. "I Don't Believe a Word" - 2:09 (Parsons)
9. "Give Me a Minute" - 3:01
10. "New York City" - 2:46
11. "I Love Her" - 3:07
12. "Bit the Bullet" - 5:00

== Personnel ==
Sham 69

- Tim Scazz - vocals
- Dave Parsons - guitar, producer, liner notes
- Rob "Zee" Jefferson - bass
- Ian Whitewood - drums, producer
