= Who Killed Joe Public =

Studio album by Sham 69
- Released: 26 September 2010
- Recorded: 2010
- Genre: Punk rock
- Length: 41:53
- Label: Step Forward Records, One Media Publishing

Sham 69 chronology
| Hollywood Hero (2007) | Who Killed Joe Public (2010) |

Professional ratings
Review scores
| Source | Rating |
|---|---|
| KidsAndHeroes | (6/10) |

Who Killed Joe Public is the Eleventh studio album by punk rock band Sham 69 and the second album not to feature original singer Jimmy Pursey. During the making of the album Pursey put up on his official site a message saying "Who Killed Sham 69?", an obvious play on words aimed at Parsons. One year after the album's release Pursey and Parsons settled their differences and reformed the 1977 line-up, thus leaving and angering the leftover members. The leftover members formed their own band called 'IF...' and toured the UK with Tony Feedback of the Angelic Upstarts and Rick Buckler of The Jam, having two drummers live. After feeling hard done by, the leftover members then decided to also tour under the name Sham 69 after original member Neil Harris joined them.

== Track listing ==
1. "Shout" - 3:26
2. "The Verdict is Vengeance" - 3:37
3. "Skin and Bone" - 3:50
4. "Then There Were None" - 3:27
5. "Hall of Fame" - 4:18
6. "Little Lady" - 2:49
7. "The Last Gang in London" - 6:40
8. "Who Killed Public Joe" - 4:05
9. "What You Gonna Do" - 2:41
10. "The Public Enemy" - 3:50
11. "Army of Tomorrow" - 3:14

== Personnel ==
Sham 69

- Dave Parsons - guitar, backing vocals
- Ian Whitewood - drums
- Tim V - vocals
- Al Campbell - bass, backing vocals
