= Volunteer (Sham 69 album) =

Studio album by Sham 69
- Released: 4 July 1988
- Genre: Glam rock, punk rock, Oi!
- Label: Legacy
- Producer: Dave Parsons, Jimmy Pursey

Sham 69 chronology
Live and Loud!! Volume 2 (1988)	Volunteer (1988)	The Complete Sham 69 Live (1989)

Professional ratings
Review scores
Source	Rating
Allmusic	2/5 stars

Volunteer is an album by punk band Sham 69, released in 1988 (see 1988 in music).

== Track listing ==
All songs by Jimmy Pursey and Dave Parsons

1. "Outside the Warehouse" - 4:13
2. "Wicked Tease" - 2:49
3. "Wallpaper" - 3:48
4. "Mr. Know It All" - 3:05
5. "As Black as Sheep" - 3:49
6. "How the West Was Won" - 3:32
7. "That Was the Day" - 3:41
8. "Rip and Tear" - 3:13
9. "Bastard Club" - 4:53
10. "Volunteer" - 3:19

== Personnel ==
- Jimmy Pursey - vocals, producer
- Dave Guy Parsons - guitar, producer
- Andy Prince - bass
- Ian Whitehead - drums
- Tony Hardie-Bick - keyboards
- Linda Paganelli - saxophone
- John Palmer - engineer
- Christopher Marc Potter - mixing
