= Direct Action: Day 21 =

Studio album by Sham 69
- Released: 9 October 2001
- Genre: Punk rock, Oi!
- Label: Resurgent
- Producer: Jimmy Pursey

Sham 69 chronology
The Punk Singles Collection 1977-80 (1998)	Direct Action: Day 21 (2001)	Hollywood Hero (2007)

Professional ratings
Review scores
Source	Rating
Allmusic	

Direct Action: Day 21 is an album by punk band Sham 69, released in 2001.

== Track listing ==
All songs by Jimmy Pursey and Dave Parsons unless noted

1. "99% 2000" - 4:04
2. "Direct Action" - 2:57
3. "Mad as a Cow" - 3:03
4. "Little Bit of This (Little Bit of That)" - 3:37
5. "Security Guard" - 2:30
6. "Dig It" - 3:03 (Parsons, Pursey, Ian Whitewood)
7. "Tattoo" - 2:58
8. "Monica" - 3:28
9. "15 Minutes" - 4:24 (Parsons, Pursey, Mat Sargent)
10. "S.H.A.G." - 3:13
11. "Tolstoy's Ape" - 3:40
12. "Do You Believe" - 5:08
13. "This Time" - 3:19
14. "Here We Are" - 3:03

== Personnel ==
- Jimmy Pursey - vocals, producer
- Dave Parsons - guitar
- Mat Sargent - bass
- Ian Whitewood - drums
- Brian Adams - executive producer
