= Soapy Water and Mister Marmalade =

Studio album by Sham 69
- Released: 1995
- Genre: Punk rock, Oi!
- Label: Plus Eye
- Producer: John Burns

Sham 69 chronology
Kings & Queens (1993)	Soapy Water and Mister Marmalade (1995)	The A Files (1997)

Professional ratings
Review scores
Source	Rating
Allmusic	2/5 stars

Soapy Water and Mister Marmalade is an album by punk band Sham 69, released in 1995 (see 1995 in music).

== Track listing ==
All songs by Jimmy Pursey unless noted

1. "Listen Up" - 4:17
2. "Girlfriend" - 3:59
3. "Little Bit of This" - 3:36 (Max Coon, Darren Courtney*, Dave Guy Parsons, Pursey)
4. "Otis Redding" - 3:57
5. "Junkie" - 4:05
6. "The Doctor's Song" - 4:09 (Max Coon, Darren Courtney*, Parsons, Pursey)
7. "Alice" - 4:20
8. "Stevie (Sweet as a Nut)" - 3:38
9. "Chasing the Moon" - 3:09
10. "Spunky Candy" - 4:20

== Personnel ==
- Jimmy Pursey - vocals
- Dave Guy Parsons - guitar, arranger
- Darren Courtney* - guitar, arranger
- Max Coon* - bass guitar
- John Burns - producer, engineer
- Brian Adams - executive producer
- David Paramor - executive producer
- James Rexroad - inlay photography, sleeve photo
