= Information Libre =

Studio album by Sham 69
- Released: 1991; 1995 (re-issue)
- Genre: Punk rock, Oi!
- Label: Rotate/Creative Man
- Producer: Dave Parsons, Jimmy Pursey, Stuart Epps

Sham 69 chronology
Live at the Roxy Club (1990)	Information Libre (1991)	Kings & Queens (1993)

Professional ratings
Review scores
Source	Rating
AllMusic	3/5 stars

Information Libre is an album by punk band Sham 69, released in 1991.

== Track listing ==
All songs by Jimmy Pursey and Dave Parsons unless noted

1. "Break on Through (To the Other Side)" – 2:47 (Densmore, Krieger, Manzarek, Morrison)
2. "Uptown" – 2:38
3. "Planet Trash" – 4:19
4. "Information Libertaire" – 3:26
5. "Caroline's Suitcase" – 4:17
6. "Feel It" – 3:17
7. "King Kong Drinks Coca-Cola" – 2:32
8. "Saturdays and Strangeways" – 3:27
9. "Breeding Dinosaurs" – 4:01
10. "Wild and Wonderful" – 4:54

== Personnel ==
- Jimmy Pursey – vocals, producer, sleeve design, cover design
- Dave Guy Parsons – guitar, producer
- Andy Prince – bass
- Ian Whitewood – drums, keyboards
- Stuart Epps – keyboards, producer, engineer, mixing, mixdown engineer
- Patricia de Mayo – keyboards
- Linda Paganelli – saxophone
- John Etchells – mixing, mixdown engineer
- Geoff Pesche – mastering
- Dick Derry – digital mastering
- Dick Meaney – digital mastering
- Dave Holmes – artwork, typesetting
- Laura Shillings – photography
