= Live in Italy =

Live in Italy may refer to:

- Live in Italy (Lou Reed album)
- Live in Italy (21st Century Schizoid Band album)
- Live in Italy (Sham 69 album)
