= The A Files =

Studio album by Sham 69
- Released: July 1, 1997
- Genre: Punk rock, Oi!
- Label: Cleopatra
- Producer: Gordon Mills, Jimmy Pursey

Sham 69 chronology
Soapy Water and Mister Marmalade (1995)	The A Files (1997)	The Punk Singles Collection 1977-80 (1998)

Professional ratings
Review scores
Source	Rating
AllMusic	2.5/5 stars

The A Files is an album by the punk band Sham 69, released in 1997.

== Critical reception ==
AllMusic wrote that "though it's jumbled and baffling, this is a very sophisticated work for a gang of boot boys from Hersham."

== Track listing ==
All songs by Dave Parsons

1. "Blackpool" - 2:01
2. "Geoffrey Thomas" - 3:09
3. "Loudmouth" - 2:09
4. "I'm Mad" - 3:02
5. "14 Years" - 3:03
6. "Mary's Sofa" - 2:58
7. "Trainspotter" - 2:22
8. "Studenthead" - 3:13
9. "Windowstare" - 4:11
10. "Sloanberg" - 2:21
11. "Roxy Was a Tourist" - 2:58
12. "Get a Life" - 2:45
13. "Swampy" - 3:57
14. "Tag 14" - instrumental - 6:20

== Personnel ==
Sham 69

- Jimmy Pursey - vocals, producer
- Dave Guy Parsons - guitar, arranger
- Mat Sargent - bass

Technical

- Gordon Mills - producer
- Bryan Adams - executive producer
- Austin Haragin - front cover photography
