= The First, the Best and the Last =

Compilation album by Sham 69
- Released: 1980; 1992 (re-release)
- Genre: Punk rock, Oi!
- Label: Polydor

Sham 69 chronology
The Game (1980)	The First, the Best and the Last (1980)	Live and Loud!! (1987)

Professional ratings
Review scores
Source	Rating
AllMusic	3/5 stars

The First, the Best and the Last is a compilation album by punk band Sham 69, released in 1980 (see 1980 in music) right after their disbandment.

== Track listing ==
1. "Borstal Breakout"
2. "Hey Little Rich Boy"
3. "Angels with Dirty Faces"
4. "The Cockney Kids Are Innocent"
5. "If the Kids Are United"
6. "Sunday Morning Nightmare"
7. "Voices (live)"
8. "Money (live)"
9. "Hurry Up Harry"
10. "Questions and Answers"
11. "Give a Dog a Bone"
12. "Hersham Boys"
13. "Tell the Children"
14. "Unite and Win"
