= The Game (Sham 69 album) =

Studio album by Sham 69
- Released: 1980
- Studios: Super Bear Studios, Berre-les-Alpes, France
- Genres: Punk rock, Oi!
- Label: Polydor
- Producers: Jimmy Pursey, Peter Wilson

Sham 69 chronology
The Adventures of the Hersham Boys (1979)	The Game (1980)	The First, the Best and the Last (1980)

Professional ratings
Review scores
Source	Rating
AllMusic	3/5 stars
Smash Hits	1/10

The Game is an album by Oi! band Sham 69, released in 1980 (see 1980 in music). The album was recorded in the French Alps with overdubbing and mixing completed at Rock City Studios, Shepperton.

== Track listing ==
All songs by Jimmy Pursey and Dave Parsons unless noted

1. "The Game" – 3:00
2. "Human Zoo" – 2:50
3. "Lord of the Flies" (Dave Tregunna) – 3:09
4. "Give a Dog a Bone" (Rick Goldstein, Parsons, Pursey, Tregunna) – 3:02
5. "In and Out" – 2:59
6. "Tell the Children" – 3:39
7. "Spray It on the Wall" (Goldstein, Tregunna) – 2:29
8. "Dead or Alive" – 2:53
9. "Simon" (Parsons) – 2:52
10. "Déjà Vu" – 3:25
11. "Poor Cow" – 3:23
12. "Run Wild Run Free" – 2:47
  CD reissue bonus tracks
13. "Jack" – 3:28
14. "Unite and Win" – 3:41
15. "I'm a Man, I'm a Boy" – 1:54
16. "Daytripper" (John Lennon, Paul McCartney) – 3:42

== Personnel ==
Sham 69

- Jimmy Pursey – vocals, producer, design, cover design, liner notes
- Dave Guy Parsons – guitar
- Dave Tregunna – bass, liner notes
- Ricky Goldstein – drums

with:

- Nik Turner – saxophone on "Tell the Children"
- Royal School of Music – backing vocals on "Lord of the Flies"

Technical

- Pete Wilson – keyboards, producer, engineer
- Brian Burrows – remixing, sleeve remix
- Alwyn Clayden – package design
- Jo Mirowski – art direction
- Rob O'Connor – artwork
- Bob Smithers – illustrations
- Shane Baldwin – liner notes
- Barry Plummer – photography

== Charts ==
Chart performance
Chart (2026)	Peak position
Croatian International Albums (HDU)	21
