= Live at CBGB =

Live at CBGB or Live at CBGB's may refer to:

- Live at CBGB (Agnostic Front album), a 1989 album by Agnostic Front
- Live at CBGB (Kill Your Idols album), a 2005 album by Kill Your Idols
- Live at CBGB's (VAST album), a 2006 album by VAST
- Live at CBGB's 1982, a 2006 album by Bad Brains
- Live at CBGB's 1983, a 1997 album by Flipper
- Live at CBGB's 1984, a 2005 album by D.R.I.
- Live CBGB's NYC 1998, a 2003 album by Alec Empire and Merzbow
- Live at CBGB's (Sham 69 album), 1991
- KoRn Live at CBGBs, a bonus DVD by Korn
- Live at CBGBs 1976 compilation with Mink deVille, Shirts, Manster, and others.
