= The Complete Sham 69 Live =

Live album by Sham 69
- Released: 1989
- Genre: Punk rock, Oi!
- Label: Castle

Sham 69 chronology
Volunteer (1988)	The Complete Sham 69 Live (1989)	Live at the Roxy Club (1990)

Professional ratings
Review scores
Source	Rating
AllMusic	3/5 stars

The Complete Sham 69 Live is a live album by punk band Sham 69, released in 1989 (see 1989 in music).

== Track listing ==
1. "Hurry Up Harry" - 2:36
2. "I Don't Wanna" - 1:53
3. "If the Kids Are United" - 3:26
4. "Borstal Breakout" - 3:03
5. "Angels with Dirty Faces" - 2:59
6. "They Don't Understand" - 2:15
7. "Rip and Tear" - 3:30
8. "Day Tripper" - 3:22
9. "That's Life" - 2:25
10. "Poor Cow" - 3:07
11. "Give a Dog a Bone" - 2:37
12. "Questions and Answers" - 3:12
13. "Tell Us the Truth" - 2:19
14. "Hersham Boys" - 3:11
15. "Vision and the Power" - 3:42
16. "White Riot" - 1:24
