= I'm a Rat =

Single by Towers of London

from the album Blood, Sweat and Towers
- Released: February 12, 2007
- Genre: Punk rock, hard rock
- Label: TVT
- Songwriter(s): Francis Brannan, Patrick Brannan

Towers of London singles chronology
"Air Guitar" (2006)	"I'm a Rat" (2007)

"I'm a Rat" is the fifth single by punk rock band Towers of London. It was taken from their debut album Blood, Sweat and Towers.

== Overview ==
Released on February 12, 2007 via independent label TVT Records, the single follows the theme of typical British Saturday night drinking culture. This single is also their first to be released in the United States. It reached number 46 on the UK Singles Chart.

Notably it is the Towers of London's first single since front man Donny Tourette emerged further into the spotlight as a pop culture star via appearances on Celebrity Big Brother and Never Mind the Buzzcocks.

Prior to release, author Stephen King named it as the 7th best song of 2006, "There is something to be said for straight puke-on-your-Dingo-boots rock & roll. Towers of London are mostly a joke, but this track — beginning with the shrieking air-raid siren — is... the real deal".

== Music video ==
The video for I'm a Rat was directed and edited by Living TV's award-winning promo maker Scott Russell, using stop motion photography.

== Different versions ==
The single has been released in various formats such as compact disc, vinyl, picture disc and mp3. Each format has a different track list, with unreleased songs on each one.

For the standard compact disc version, which featured the Tourette brother's faces on the cover, special features include the previously unreleased b-side track "The Women I Love". Along with two promotional videos, one for "I'm a Rat" and the other is "Faster Than The Fastest Car", another previously unreleased track. The vinyl variation (which has the same cover) featured unreleased bonus track "The Popscene - Original Demo".

Special Edition - Picture disc cover

A limited edition picture disc was also released, it featured guitarist The Rev and bassist Tommy Brunette on the cover instead, it also has a previously unreleased bonus; "The Boy Who Found A Girl".

== Track list ==
=== Compact disc ===
1. "I'm a Rat"
2. "The Women I Love"
3. "Faster Than the Fastest Car" [Video]
4. "I'm a Rat" [Video]

=== Vinyl record ===
1. "I'm a Rat"
2. "The Popscene" (Original Demo)

=== Picture disc ===
1. "I'm a Rat"
2. "The Boy Who Found a Girl" (Exclusive Recording)
