= Towers of London (band) =

English punk rock band

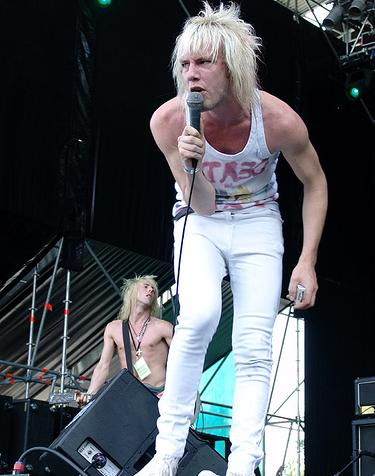
- Lead singer Donny Tourette, 2005

Background information
- Origin: Buckinghamshire, England
- Genres: Hard rock; punk rock; glam metal; indie rock
- Years active: 2004–2009; 2015–present
- Labels: TVT (2005–2008); Vibrant
- Members: Donny Tourette; Dirk Tourette; Tommy Brunette; The Rev; Snell

Towers of London are an English punk rock band, who formed in 2004. Their music mixes elements of rock and glam metal music with 1977 style British punk. The band have divided the opinions of the British music press since their emergence in early 2004.

== History ==
In 2003, a band was formed named 'The Tourettes', featuring Dirk and Donny Tourette (real names Francis and Patrick Brannan); the brothers had been playing together in rock bands since secondary school. The Tourettes played in a glam punk style, which has been described as "a post Manic Street Preachers rock 'n' roll rush".

=== Blood, Sweat and Towers ===
The band signed to New York independent record label TVT Records in early 2005. Whilst on TVT, they released a string of singles; "On A Noose", "Fuck It Up", "How Rude She Was", "Air Guitar" and "I'm A Rat".

In mid-2005, Towers of London performed at two festivals in the United Kingdom: Reading and Leeds Festivals and Download Festival. The band's performance was received well, but due to fighting backstage after another group allegedly stole their property, they are now banned from returning to the Download Festival. Lead singer Donny Tourette was brought before Cambridge Magistrates Court in June 2005, for criminal damage during a show at Cambridge Anglia Ruskin University in February 2005. He was ordered to pay £775 of compensation, court costs and fines.

In June 2006, Towers of London released their debut album Blood, Sweat and Towers. It was produced by Stacy Jones and Bill Lefler. The album featured thirteen tracks, including the five singles they had released to date.

=== TV series and support dates ===
In the spring of 2006, the band travelled to New York City to join The Pogues as support for their annual U.S. Saint Patrick Day shows, at the Best Buy Theater in Times Square. The band also opened for Guns N' Roses on two of their 2006 summer UK tour dates, Dirk commented; "Guns N' Roses? What more can you say? We're going to have it this weekend!". During the summer of 2006 the band played on the main stage at the Reading and Leeds Festivals. Bravo TV aired a ten-part TV series about the band, after camera crews followed them for around for a year. The show, named simply The Towers of London, featured footage of various performances including the 2005 Download Festival which saw them banned from the event. Various clips have already been released on the internet, one which shows members of the band assaulting a member of the public after being provoked. The show launched on 19 October.

Dirk Tourette had an altercation with the American band My Chemical Romance, in which he allegedly threw a lit cigarette at the band's drummer Bob Bryar at their in-store performance. Members of the band, who attended because of "free booze", got into a scuffle with My Chemical Romance's tour managers.

In October 2006, Towers of London supported the New York Dolls, on three of their UK tour dates in London, Liverpool and Glasgow. The band then released their fifth Single, "I'm A Rat", on 12 February 2007.

Donny Tourette joined Celebrity Big Brother 5 on 3 January 2007, at the start of the series. He left the show after just 48 hours by scaling a wall to escape.

Following this, he also appeared on the comedy panel game show Never Mind the Buzzcocks. During the episode, Tourette was the target of repeated jibes from host Simon Amstell. At one point he grabbed his crotch and said to Amstell, "This is what I think of you" to which Amstell replied "You think me a small penis?". Later, in an attempt to be controversial, Tourette began smoking. "Oh my God!", Amstell declared, "Donny is smoking! A cigarette you can legally buy in shops!". Tourette was branded "as punk as Enya" after losing his temper when the results were read out (Tourette's team had lost).

In 2007, The Rev and Snell participated in the Mighty Boosh episode "Journey to the Centre of the Punk" as members of the band Terminal Margaret.

The band proceeded with a full tour of the United Kingdom in support of the "I'm a Rat" single. Towers of London had a lucky escape in February 2007, after a group of teenagers targeted the band with breeze blocks. The five-piece were chatting to a group of fans after a gig outside York Fibbers when the incident happened. One of the teenagers was caught and handed over to the police.

=== Rev and Snell leave – New album ===
On 13 July, it was revealed by NME that The Rev and Snell had left the band because they believed 'their future is not with the band'. However, Towers of London would continue their tour throughout July, drafting in friends Kristian Marr and Aaron Attwood to fill the positions.

The band then retreated to prepare their second album, releasing four songs called "The Bible", "The Towers Waltz", "Naked on the Dancefloor" and "Start the Rupt" on their MySpace page. Towers of London auditioned for a new drummer and lead guitar player, meeting such musicians as Ben Taylor, (who went on to drum for the Towers at their comeback gig in Harlow), Julian Molinero from Medusa and guitarist Tom Earl (formerly of the hard rock groups Rope & Widow and Swallow This).

Former members Rev and Snell played with the electronic group The Prodigy as part of their live band throughout 2007. More recently, they formed a punk outfit, DAY 21, with Jimmy Pursey and bassist Mat Sargent from Sham 69.

The Rev went on to play with The Howling, before leaving that group and becoming the lead guitarist for the live incarnation of Ginger Wildheart's Hey! Hello! project.

Snell went on to play for The Loyalties, with Tom Spencer (ex-The Yo-Yos), Rich Jones (ex-The Black Halos, Amen, Alec Empire, Ginger Wildheart Band, Michael Monroe) and Lee Jones (ex-Deadline). In 2019, Snell joined Medusa as their new drummer and recorded the album 'In Bed with Medusa' at Electrical Audio, Chicago with engineer Steve Albini.

=== Fizzy Pop ===
On 6 June 2008, the band played a comeback gig at Club Quattroz in Harlow, Essex. They used James Phillips (guitar) and auditionee Ben Taylor (drums) for the gig. The set consisted of four songs from their debut album, and a variety of brand new songs. A few months later, the band updated their MySpace with a selection of dates for mid October 2008, where a mini-tour would occur to coincide with their new album, Fizzy Pop (released 29 September), with a school friend on drums.

"Go Sister, Go", a track from the album, was released as a single in early 2009.

=== 2009 events and 'Back to Basics' Tour ===
In January 2009, the band were scheduled to tour Europe again, starting with a warm-up at the Queens Hotel in Weymouth. However, after only a brief stint in Europe, the band fell silent in May that year. In September 2009, Towers of London posted dates for a 'Back to Basics' tour. An acoustic set with Donny and Dirk Tourette was arranged for their first gig in early October. However, their next scheduled appearance at Rockfest was cancelled, due to problems beyond the band's control.

=== 2013 to 2019 ===
The band rebooted again, this time with Rocco (Thom Durrant) on drums and Stevie Sunset (Steve Lawrence) on lead guitar. The band wrote and released new singles including 'Shake It' and 'Send in the Roses', some with Italian label GBSound, culminating in an Italian tour. After a falling out with the label, the band continued to write and play in the UK before heading to LA to record a new album with producer Bill Lefler, of which some tracks were eventually released on the 2022 EP 'Yet To Be'.

Upon returning to England, Towers were briefly managed by Alan McGee, before a disagreement. The Towers then started a project called '365 Days to Make It', with the claim that if the project didn't become successful within a year they would disband. Early into this period, Rocco and Stevie Sunset left the band for reasons unknown.

=== 2019 ===
13 years on from their debut album, Blood Sweat & Towers, the Towers Of London reformed with the original line up with promise of a new album, which was planned to have been released in 2019.

In 2019, a documentary film titled "Towers of London: the Movie" was announced. It has since been renamed "F**K IT UP!". It was set for its premiere in April 2022 at the Hot Docs Film Festival in Toronto but before the screening, the film was withdrawn for undisclosed reasons and all screenings were cancelled, including online. In October 2022 it was announced that the documentary would have its European Premiere at the Doc n Roll Festival in London in November 2022 but was also withdrawn for unknown reasons.

== Band members ==
- Donny Tourette – vocals (2004–2009, 2015–present)
- Dirk Tourette – rhythm guitar, vocals (2004–2009, 2015–present)
- Tommy Brunette – bass, vocals (2004–2009, 2015–present)
- The Rev – lead guitar, vocals (2004–2007, 2019–present)
- Snell – drums (2004–2007, 2019–present)
- Rocco – drums (2013–2019)
- Stevie Sunset – lead guitar (2014–2019)
- Cecil Niblock - bongos (2016)

== Discography ==
=== Albums ===
Year	Title	Chart Position
Year	Title	UK Albums Chart
2006	Blood, Sweat and Towers	85
2008	Fizzy Pop	–
2022	Yet To Be EP	–

=== Singles ===
Year	Title	Chart Position	Album
Year	Title	UK Singles Chart	Album
2005	"On a Noose"	32	Blood, Sweat and Towers
2005	"Fuck It Up"	46	Blood, Sweat and Towers
2005	"How Rude She Was"	30	Blood, Sweat and Towers
2006	"Air Guitar"	32	Blood, Sweat and Towers
2007	"I'm a Rat"	46	Blood, Sweat and Towers
2008	"Free Bird"	Not officially released	iTunes Exclusive
2008	"Naked on the Dancefloor"	DNC	Fizzy Pop
2009	"Go Sister, Go"	DNC	Fizzy Pop
2015	"Shake It"	DNC	
2017	"Shot in the Dark"	DNC	
