= Blood, Sweat and Towers =

Studio album by Towers of London
- Released: 5 June 2006
- Genre: Hard rock, punk rock
- Length: 46:46
- Label: TVT Records
- Producer: Stacy Jones, Bill Lefler

Towers of London chronology
Blood, Sweat and Towers (2006)	Fizzy Pop (2008)

Singles from Blood, Sweat and Towers
- 1. "On a Noose" Released: 7 March 2005; 2. "Fuck It Up" Released: 28 June 2005; 3. "How Rude She Was" Released: 15 November 2005; 4. "Air Guitar" Released: 13 June 2006; 5. "I'm a Rat" Released: 13 February 2007

Professional ratings
Review scores
Source	Rating
About.com	5/5 stars
AllMusic	3/5 stars
Pitchfork Media	1.5/10

Blood, Sweat and Towers is the debut album of English punk rock band Towers of London, released on 5 June 2006. The album features thirteen tracks, four of which have been released in the United Kingdom as singles.

The album was heavily influenced by Sex Pistols' Never Mind the Bollocks and Guns N' Roses' Appetite for Destruction. Sonically, the songs contained on Blood, Sweat and Towers are played in a loose punk rock style.

The song "Fuck It Up" features on the album twice: one version is an acoustic rendition, while the other is a version by the full band, which was previously released as a single in 2005. It is one of only six UK top 50 singles to have the word "fuck" in the title.

Blood, Sweat and Towers was released on three different dates, depending on location;

- Germany, Austria and Switzerland – 26 May 2006
- England – 5 June 2006
- United States – 1 August 2006

== Track listing ==
1. "I'm a Rat" (New Air Raid Intro)
2. "Air Guitar"
3. "Kill the Popscene"
4. "Beaujolais"
5. "Fuck It Up" (Acoustic)
6. "King"
7. "Good Times"
8. "On a Noose"
9. "Start Believing"
10. "Northern Lights"
11. "I Lose It" (US & Canada Only)
12. "Fuck It Up" (Band)
13. "How Rude She Was"
14. "Son of A Preacher" (US & Canada Only)
15. "Seen It All"
16. T.V. (Japan Only)
17. City of Hell (Japan Only)

== Personnel ==
Tower of London

- Donny Tourette – vocals
- Dirk Tourette – rhythm guitar
- The Rev – lead guitar
- Tommy Brunette – bass guitar
- Snell – drums

Technical personnel

- Stacey Jones, Bill Lefler – producers
