= Medusa (band) =

English rock band

- Medusa's Julian Molinero in Hollywood, CA

Background information
- Origin: Blackburn, Lancashire, United Kingdom
- Genres: Punk rock, hard rock
- Years active: 1998–present
- Labels: Poison Tree; Cyberpunk
- Members: Julian Molinero; Kotaro Suzuki; Moyano El Buffalo

Medusa are an English rock band from Blackburn, based in London, led by Julian Molinero. They have had numerous lineups but have consistently been a three-piece group.

== History ==
Formed in Blackburn, Lancashire in spring 1998, by guitarist and vocalist Julian Molinero whilst still at school.

Over the next several years, the band went through many lineup changes and claimed to have been banned from the majority of venues they played in the early years.

The band finally recorded and released their debut album, Medusa, in 2006. The second album Can't Fucking Win was released in March 2011.

Their second music video, to the track Tinkerbell, features intoxicated dwarf Josh Bennett, a reality TV star from the Channel 4 show Seven Dwarves, dressed as an Oompa Loompa on a drunken limousine ride with the band. In 2014, the band released their third album Headcase's Handbook, produced by Deaf Havana producer Lee Batiuk.

In 2016 and 2017, the band headlined monthly shows in London, as well as playing gigs at a few other towns in England.

Neal "Snell" Eldridge joined the band as the new drummer in late 2019; best known as the drummer from Towers of London but whom had also played drums for The Prodigy.

They recorded their fourth album In Bed with Medusa with Steve Albini at his studio Electrical Audio in Chicago. It was released in February 2020.

The band played on the main stage at the O2 Academy, Sheffield on 2 October 2021 at the HRH Punk Festival. In 2023, Medusa played a show on a boat sailing the River Thames in London which was filmed and recorded for a concert movie.

In 2025, Medusa released the concert movie Medusa Live in London: The Motion Picture. The short film includes documentary footage, a cartoon in the style of Hanna-Barbera and a marionette puppet version of Julian Molinero.

== Discography ==
=== Albums ===
- Medusa (2006)
- Can't Fucking Win (2011)
- Headcase's Handbook (2014)
- In Bed with Medusa (2020)
