= Fizzy Pop =

Studio album by Towers of London
- Released: 6 October 2008
- Genre: Indie
- Label: Vibrant Records

Towers of London chronology
| Blood, Sweat and Towers (2006) | Fizzy Pop (2008) |

Singles from Fizzy Pop
- 1. "Naked on the Dance Floor" Released: 29 Sep 2008; 2. "Go Sister Go" Released: 9 Feb 2009

Professional ratings
Review scores
| Source | Rating |
|---|---|
| AllMusic | 3.5/5 stars |
| The Fly | 1.5/5 stars |
| musicOMH | 2/5 stars |
| NME | 3/5 stars |

Fizzy Pop is Towers of London's second album. Released 6 October 2008, it contains the singles "Naked on the Dance Floor" and "Go Sister Go". It did not achieve a position in the UK top 75 album chart.

== Track listing ==
1. "Naked on the Dance Floor"
2. "Go Sister Go"
3. "Time Is Running Out"
4. "1984 (Nanny Nation)"
5. "Queen of Cool"
6. "Start the Rupt"
7. "When She Comes"
8. "Avaline"
9. "If It Don't Feel Good"
10. "Bishops Gate"
11. "Beach Bar"
12. "New Skin"

== B-sides ==
| Song | B-side of |
|---|---|
| "Hollywood" | "Naked on the Dance Floor" |
| "Anything You Want" | "Naked on the Dance Floor" |
