= Day 21 =

English punk rock group

- Origin: England
- Genres: Punk rock
- Years active: 2008–2011

Day 21 were a short-lived English punk rock group, led by Jimmy Pursey.

On 21 January 2008, Pursey announced that, due to ongoing confusion to fans, he would no longer be associated with the name Sham 69, and that his new band would perform under the name Day 21.

The new band played their debut gig at Clockwork Marmalade, and frontman Pursey was backed by Mat Sargent (also from Sham 69) on bass, The Rev (The Prodigy and Towers of London) on guitar, and Snell (Towers of London) on drums.

In 2011, Pursey disbanded Day 21 and reformed the original line-up of Sham 69.
