= Tell the Children =

Single by Sham 69

from the album The Game
- B-side: "Jack"
- Released: March 1980
- Recorded: late 1979
- Genre: Punk rock
- Length: 3:39
- Label: Polydor (POSP 136)
- Songwriter(s): Jimmy Pursey, Dave Guy Parsons
- Producer(s): Peter Wilson, Jimmy Pursey

Sham 69 singles chronology
"You're a Better Man Than I" (1979)	"Tell the Children" (1980)	"Unite and Win" (1980)

"Tell The Children" is a single by Sham 69 released in 1980 after their band was disbanded in 1979 from fourth studio album The Game. It reached number 45 on the UK Singles Chart for three weeks.

== Track listing ==
Side one

1. "Tell The Children"

Side two

1. "Jack"
