= Sham Pistols =

English punk rock band (1979)

- Origin: England, United Kingdom
- Genre: Punk rock
- Years active: 1979
- Past members: Jimmy Pursey; Steve Jones; Paul Cook; Dave "Kermit" Tregunna

The Sham Pistols were a short-lived punk rock supergroup composed of guitarist Steve Jones and drummer Paul Cook of the Sex Pistols, with vocalist Jimmy Pursey and bass player Dave Tregunna of Sham 69. Although now referred to as The Sham Pistols, no name had been decided upon at the time. There was a possibility that they may have been called the Sex Pistols.

== Formation and recordings ==
After the January 1978 departure of John Lydon from the Sex Pistols, guitarist Steve Jones and drummer Paul Cook were looking for a new singer. Initially, Simon Draper, the Managing Director of Virgin Records told Melody Maker "Whoever joins Cook and Jones will be part of the Sex Pistols".

Pursey and Jones had previously joined together to guest on a song with The Clash in July 78 at London's Music Machine. Steve Dior of The London Cowboys and The Idols stated in the liner notes for The London Cowboys CD Relapse that he jammed with Cook and Jones at Denmark Street with the idea of forming a band. He stated that "When they started to consider Jimmy Pursey for the vocal spot I decided to leave. At the time we were called The Bollock Brothers". Paul Cook told Gary Bushell of Sounds in July 1979 "Jim (Pursey) is the only person who's come along who we can get on with. E's the same as us, see".

In July 1979, Pursey told the NME that they had recorded 10 songs — seven originals and three cover versions — and that they would be ready to tour by September that year. Among the songs the group were planning to play live were "Silly Thing", "Lonely Boy", "Submission" and "Pretty Vacant" from the Sex Pistols and "Joey's on the Street" and "If the Kids are United" from Sham 69. In the liner notes for The Complete Professionals, a compilation of songs by Jones and Cook's next band, The Professionals, Phil Singleton states that songs run through in the studio on 6 and 9 August included "Some Play Dirty", "Natural Born Killer", "Silly Thing", "Here We Go Again" "1-2-3" and "Kamikaze".

In October 2015 the Sham Pistols tracks "Some Play Dirty" and "Natural Born Killer" were released on the UMC/Mercury triple CD set "The Complete Professionals". Although Pursey wrote the lyrics to these tracks he is not listed on the songwriting credits.

== Breakup ==
Jones had told Smash Hits in the July 79 edition that "We couldn't believe it when we met him (Pursey). He was all mouth and he cried - stuff like that. He's too emotional. All he wanted to do was be a Sex Pistol". He added "We thought that we'd get a load of money for doing something that wasn't too bad. We could have made a load of money but he just put us off it". Jones wrote in his autobiography Lonely Boy "When me and Cookie gave Jimmy a try, it was never going to be the Sex Pistols in our minds, we always thought of it as a new group. The odd thing about it was that we liked him, but when we got together to try and write some songs in a studio out in the country, he couldn't fucking come up with anything. His cover was blown - he didn't have the talents or intelligence that Rotten did, nowhere near". After the dissolution of the band, Cook and Jones went on to form The Professionals and Pursey moved on to solo projects, later reforming Sham 69.

== Discography ==
=== Sham Pistols - Natural Born Killer ===
Studio Side

- "Natural Born Killer"
- "You & Me" (Sham 69)
- "Trainspotter" (Sham 69)
- "Individual" (Sham 69)

(Manor Studios June '79)

Live Side

- "Pretty Vacant"
- "White Riot"
- "If the Kids Are United"
- "What Have We Got"

(Glasgow Apollo June '79)

=== Other ===
- Sham's Last Stand (1993) - Dojo DOJOCD95 & Snapper SMMCD 540
- Sham 69 Live in Glasgow 1979 (2001) - Sanctuary Records CMRCD351
- Sham Pistols Natural Born Killer (PunkClassics 2010) - PCLP57016
- The Complete Professionals - The Professionals - UMC / Mercury 5363279
