= Live at the Roxy Club =

Live album by Sham 69
- Released: 1990
- Genre: Punk rock, Oi!
- Length: 30:54
- Label: Receiver

Sham 69 chronology
The Complete Sham 69 Live (1989)	Live at the Roxy Club (1990)	Information Libre (1991)

Professional ratings
Review scores
Source	Rating
AllMusic	2/5 stars

Live at the Roxy Club is a live album by punk band Sham 69, recorded at the Roxy and released in 1990 (see 1990 in music).

== Track listing ==
1. "Rip Off" - 2:03
2. "Ulster Boy" - 2:51
3. "Borstal Breakout" - 2:11
4. "Everybody's Innocent" - 2:19
5. "Angels with Dirty Faces" - 2:31
6. "Who Gives a Damn" - 3:25
7. "That's Life" - 2:20
8. "Tell Us the Truth" - 2:43
9. "Day Tripper" - 3:31
10. "Questions and Answers" - 3:29
11. "If the Kids Are United" - 3:31
