= Mister, You're a Better Man Than I =

"You're a Better Man Than I"

Single by the Yardbirds

from the album Having a Rave Up with the Yardbirds
- A-side: "Shapes of Things" (UK)
- Released: 30 November 1965 (US album); 25 February 1966 (UK single)
- Recorded: September 1965
- Studio: Phillips Recording, Memphis, Tennessee; Columbia Recording, New York City
- Genre: Rock; folk rock
- Length: 3:15
- Label: Epic (US); Columbia (UK)
- Songwriter(s): Mike Hugg; Brian Hugg
- Producer(s): Giorgio Gomelsky

Yardbirds UK singles chronology
"Evil Hearted You" (1965)	"You're a Better Man Than I" (1965)	"Over Under Sideways Down" (1966)

"You're a Better Man Than I", alternately listed as "Mr. You're a Better Man Than I" or "Better Man Than I", is a song first recorded by the English rock band the Yardbirds. It was written by brothers Mike and Brian Hugg, and became the opening track to the group's second American album, Having a Rave Up with the Yardbirds (1965). Three months later in February 1966, it was released in the UK as the B-side to the "Shapes of Things" single.

With its politically conscientious lyrics and catchy melody, "You're a Better Man Than I" has been covered several times. A version by American garage rock band Terry Knight and the Pack appeared on Billboard magazine's Bubbling Under Hot 100 chart also released by sham69

== Critical commentary ==
In a song review for AllMusic, Matthew Greenwald writes:

The song was the Yardbirds' first of several stabs at a contemporary folk-rock type of song, and this recording succeeds without compromising the band's dark, threatening lyrics. The lyrics are striking, taking accurate aim at the hypocrites of society and politics, and the fact that men cannot judge each other, despite race, creed, or religion.

Besides the lyrics, he adds that "Jeff Beck's sinewy electric guitar solo is the most identifiable ingredient in the brilliant arrangement".

== Recordings by other artists ==
In February 1966, Terry Knight and the Pack recorded their version of "You're a Better Man Than I" after hearing the Yardbirds perform the song at a gig in Michigan. Writing on the musical career of Terry Knight, music historian Barry Stroller described the Pack's rendition as a "bona-fide classic", before commending its "surprisingly subtle delivery, basic electric guitar chords supported gently with organ and rhythm section, Knight brilliantly finds (admittedly in lyrics he did not write) a perfect narrative in which to grow from teeniebopper heartthrob to social voice of conscience". The song was the first recording by the group to chart nationally, bubbling under the Billboard charts at number 125. Regionally, "Better Man Than I" also reached the Top 10 of several radio charts, and overall sold approximately 150,000 copies.

Also in 1966, Chicago-based garage rock band New Colony Six included the song on their debut album Breakthrough. AllMusic critic Richie Unterberger described it as one of the "routine, dispensible covers" on the album. In 1969, Manfred Mann Chapter Three, with Mike Hugg on lead vocals, released the song on their self-titled debut album.

English punk band Sham 69 covered the song for a 1979 single making the UK top 50; it featured on their third album, The Adventures of the Hersham Boys.

South Florida roots/country rock act Charlie Pickett & the Eggs covered the song on their 1982 album Live at the Button.
