= I Don't Wanna (Sham 69 song) =

Single by Sham 69
- B-side: "Ulster"/"Red London"
- Released: 28 October 1977
- Recorded: August 1977
- Studio: Pathway Studios, London
- Genre: Punk rock
- Length: 1:46
- Label: Step Forward (SF 4)
- Songwriter(s): Jimmy Pursey, Dave Parsons
- Producer(s): John Cale

Sham 69 singles chronology
"I Don't Wanna" (1977)	"Borstal Breakout" (1978)

"I Don't Wanna" is a song by English punk rock band Sham 69, which was released as the band's debut single on 28 October 1977. It was their only release on independent label Step Forward Records before signing with Polydor, and was successful on the independent chart. Two B-side tracks, "Ulster" and "Red London" appear on the single. "I Don't Wanna" was written by frontman Jimmy Pursey and guitarist Dave Parsons and produced by John Cale, a founding and former member of experimental rock band The Velvet Underground. The songs were recorded in August 1977 at Pathway Studios in London. Jill Furmanovsky took the cover photograph.

== Track listing ==
Side one

1. "I Don't Wanna" (Jimmy Pursey, Dave Parsons) – 1:46

Side two

1. "Ulster" (Jimmy Pursey, Dave Parsons) – 2:40
2. "Red London" (Dave Parsons) – 1:55

== Production credits ==
- Producer: John Cale
- Musicians:
  - Jimmy Pursey – singer
  - David Parsons – guitar
  - Albie Maskell – bass guitar
  - Mark Cain – drums
