= Hurry Up Harry =

"Hurry Up, Harry"

Single by Sham 69

from the album That's Life
- B-side: "No Entry"
- Released: October 1978
- Recorded: 1978
- Genre: Punk rock, oi!
- Length: 3:04
- Label: Polydor (POSP 7)
- Songwriters: David Guy Parsons, Jimmy Pursey
- Producers: Peter Wilson, Jimmy Pursey

Sham 69 singles chronology
"If the Kids Are United" (1978)	"Hurry Up, Harry" (1978)	"Questions and Answers" (1979)

"Hurry Up, Harry" is a song by English band Sham 69 was released in October 1978, which came from their second studio album That's Life. The single was backed by the B-side "No Entry". It reached number 10 on the UK Singles Chart, with an overall chart lifespan of eight weeks. The song was on their 1980 compilation album The First, the Best and the Last and 1989 live album The Complete Sham 69 Live. They appeared on the BBC television show Top of the Pops and performed "Hurry Up, Harry".

In 2006, the single "Hurry Up, England" was released as an alternative football anthem for England's entry in the 2006 FIFA World Cup, featuring samples from the original.

== Track listing ==
Side one

1. "Hurry Up, Harry"

Side two

1. "No Entry"

== Chart performances ==
Chart (1978)	Peak position
UK Singles (Official Charts)	10
Ireland (IRMA)	19
