= Questions and Answers (Sham 69 song) =

1979 single by Sham 69

Single by Sham 69

from the album The Adventures of the Hersham Boys
- B-side: "Gotta Survive (live)"; "With a Little Help from My Friends
- Released: 16 March 1979
- Recorded: February 1979
- Genre: Punk rock, Oi!
- Length: 3:14 (album version); 3:18 (7" single edit)
- Label: Polydor (POSP 27)
- Songwriter(s): Jimmy Pursey, Dave Guy Parsons
- Producer(s): Peter Wilson, Jimmy Pursey

Sham 69 singles chronology
"'Hurry Up Harry'" (1978)	"Questions and Answers" (1979)	"'Hersham Boys'" (1979)

"Questions and Answers" is a song by Sham 69 released in 1979 from their third studio album The Adventures of the Hersham Boys. It reached number eighteen on the UK Singles Chart. The song also featured with live and compilation albums including The First, the Best and the Last in 1980, Live and Loud!! in 1987, The Complete Sham 69 Live in 1989, Live at the Roxy Club in 1990, The Punk Singles Collection 1977-80 in 1998. The B-side tracks "Gotta Survive (live)" and The Beatles' cover version "With a Little Help from My Friends" appears on this single. The song "Questions and Answers" was written and produced by frontman Jimmy Pursey and guitarist Dave Parsons of Sham 69, and Peter Wilson.

== Reception ==
Smash Hits said, "Ironic that just when Jimmy Pursey and his mates decide to disband they come out with one of their strongest ever records. Good forthright songs that typify Pursey's own character, and the band have seldom sounded fitter."

== Track listing ==
Side one

1. "Questions and Answers" - 3:14

Side two

1. "Gotta Survive (live)" - 1:31
2. "With a Little Help from My Friends" - 2:36 (John Lennon/Paul McCartney)
