= Sham 69 =

English punk rock band

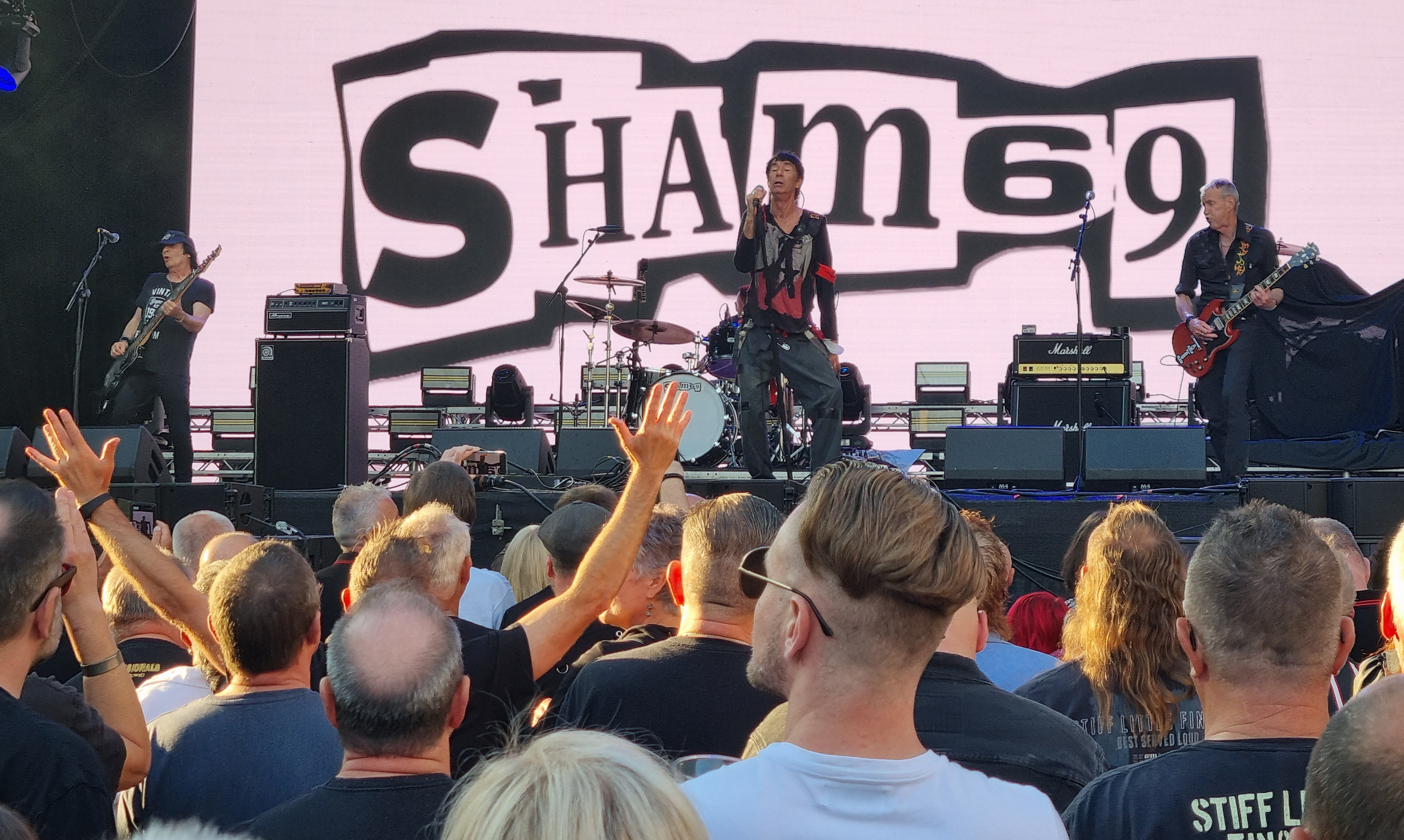
- Sham 69 in 2025

Background information
- Also known as: Hersham Boys
- Origin: Hersham, Surrey, England
- Genres: Punk rock; Oi!
- Years active: 1975–1980; 1987–present
- Labels: Polydor; Parlophone; Step Forward
- Members: Classic version; Jimmy Pursey; Dave Parsons; Dave Tregunna; Spike T. Smith; Tim V version; Tim V.; Tom Austin-Morgan; Paul Brightman; Ian Whitewood
- Past members: Billy Bostick; Alby Slider; Johnny Goodfornothing; Neil Harris; Jonathan Phillips; Pete Nash; Ricky Goldstein; Andy Prince; Mat Sargent; Mark Cain; Danny Fury; Stuart Wilson; Rob Jefferson; Sonny Boy Williamson; Alan Campbell; John Woodward; Ryan Monshall; Robin Guy

Sham 69 is an English punk rock band that formed in Hersham in Surrey in 1975. They changed their musical direction after seeing the Sex Pistols play live in early 1976. They were one of the most successful punk bands in the United Kingdom, achieving five top 20 singles, including "If the Kids Are United" and "Hurry Up Harry". The group's popularity saw them perform on the BBC’s Top of the Pops, and they appeared in the rockumentary film D.O.A.. The original unit broke up in 1980, with frontman Jimmy Pursey moving on to pursue a solo career.

In 1987, Pursey and guitarist David Parsons reformed the band, joined by new personnel. Although subsequently going through a number of line-up changes, Sham 69 remained active and were still playing gigs as of 2024.

== History ==
=== Formation ===
Sham 69 was formed in Hersham, Surrey in 1975, although originally known (according to some sources) as Jimmy and the Ferrets. 'Sham 69' is said to have derived from a piece of graffiti that co-founder Jimmy Pursey saw on a wall. It originally said Walton and Hersham '69 but had partly faded away, and made reference to when Walton & Hersham F.C. secured the Athenian League title in 1969.

The 12 November 1976 issue of NME noted that Sham 69 was rehearsing in 1976, although only Pursey would remain from this early line-up twelve months later. Original guitarists Johnny Goodfornothing (a.k.a. John Goode) and Neil Harris were replaced by Dave Parsons, and drummer Billy Bostik (a.k.a. Andy Nightingale) by Mark Cain. Albie Slider (a.k.a. Albie Maskell) remained for the group's first single in 1977 before being replaced by Dave Tregunna. The Pursey/Parsons/Tregunna/Cain line up then remained stable until 1979, when Ricky Goldstein took over on drums for the band's fourth album.

Sham 69 did not have the art school background of many English punk bands of the time, and brought in football chant backup vocals and an implicit political populism. The band attracted a large skinhead following (left wing, right wing and non-political). Their concerts were plagued by violence, and the band ceased live performances after a 1979 concert at the Rainbow Theatre in Finsbury Park was broken up by National Front-supporting white power skinheads fighting and rushing the stage.

=== Recordings ===
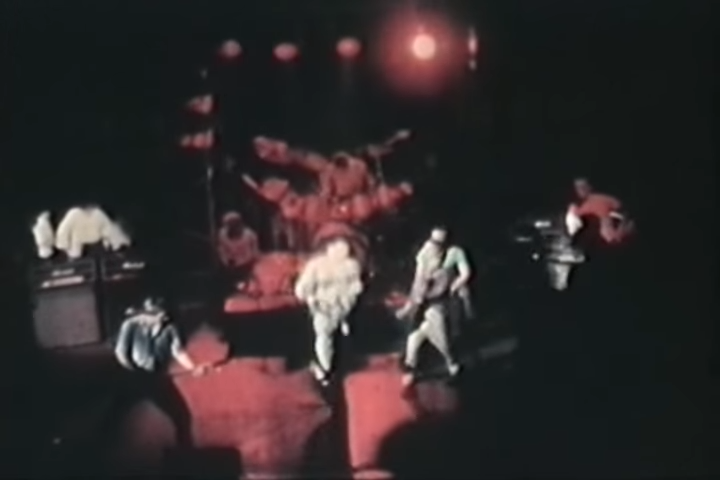
Sham 69 performing in 1978

Sham 69 released their first single, "I Don't Wanna", on Step Forward Records in August 1977, produced by John Cale (formerly of the Velvet Underground), and its success in the independent charts prompted Polydor Records to sign the band. Their major label debut was "Borstal Breakout" in January 1978, followed by UK Singles Chart success with "Angels with Dirty Faces" (reaching No. 19 in May 1978) and "If the Kids Are United" (No. 9 in July 1978). These were not included on the group's debut album, Tell Us the Truth, a mixture of live and studio recordings.

The group had further chart success with "Hurry Up Harry" (No. 10 in October 1978), which came from their second LP and first full studio album, That's Life. The band's popularity was enhanced by their performances on Top of the Pops, and the band performed in the film, D.O.A. around this time (although the film was not released until 1980). Sham 69 would ultimately be one of the most successful UK punk rock bands, releasing five singles that cracked the Top 20 of the UK Singles Chart.

The band eventually started to move away from punk rock, to embrace a sound heavily influenced by classic British rock bands such as Mott the Hoople, The Who, the Rolling Stones and Faces. This was demonstrated by their third album, The Adventures of the Hersham Boys.

=== Demise ===
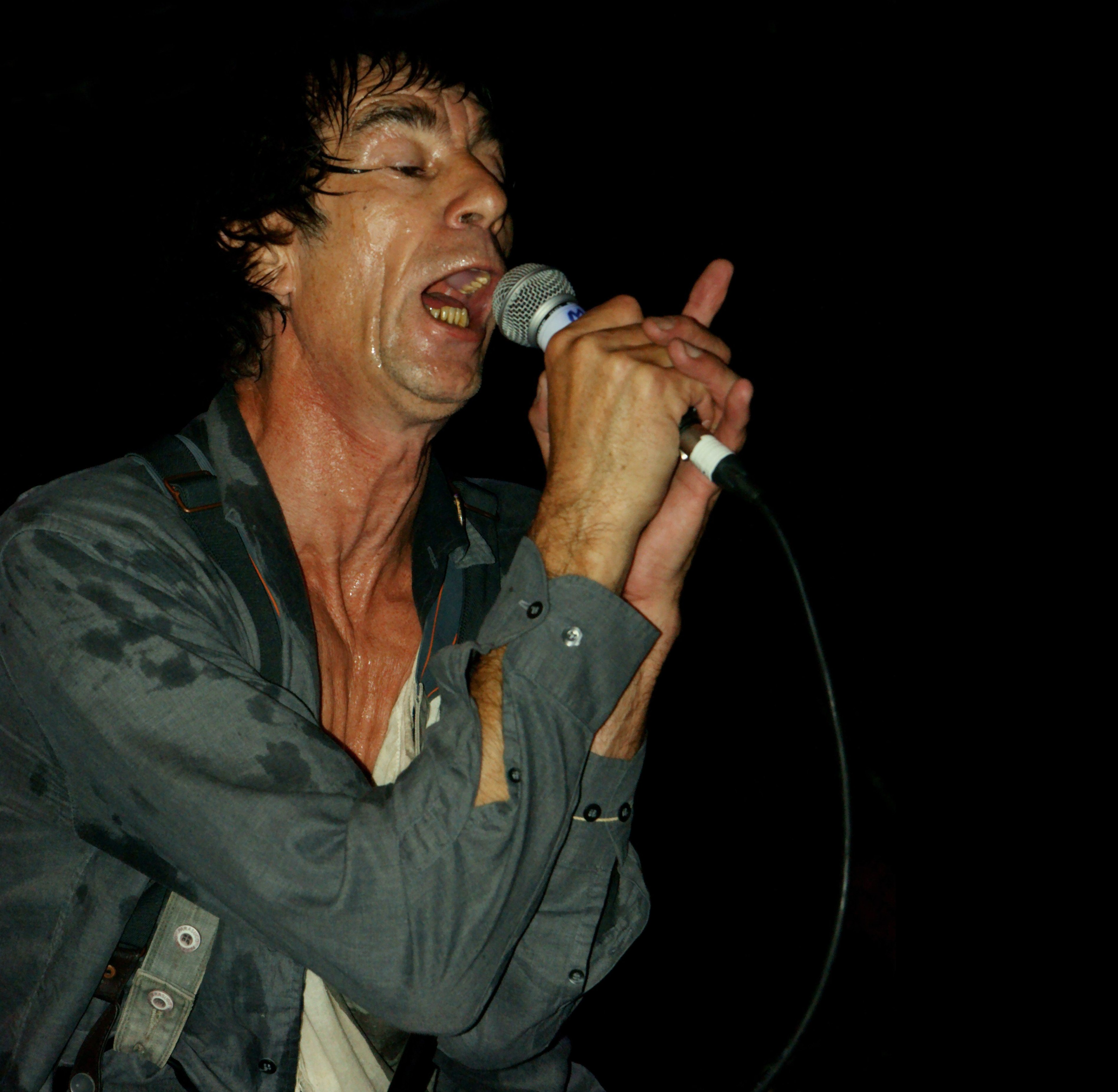
Original singer Jimmy Pursey in 2012

The original incarnation of Sham 69 disbanded in 1980, following the release of the band's fourth album, The Game. Pursey was enormously critical of the album, calling it "a pile of shit" in a 1989 Flipside interview, noting:

"I was forced into making it, you understand? I called it The Game because that's how the music business had become to me. Like a little roulette wheel where everything we did had all of this political value to it, but it didn't make any difference because you spin the wheel and if it landed on the right number you were all right, the wrong number and you were not all right."

Pursey formed the short-lived band Sham Pistols with former Sex Pistols members Steve Jones and Paul Cook, before moving on to a solo recording career. Pursey's first solo album was with Polydor Records, the label for which Sham 69 had recorded, but was a commercial and critical failure. The second solo album, Alien Orphans, was recorded with CBS Records France. For his third solo album, Revenge Is Not the Password, Pursey paid for the recording out of his own pocket in order to maintain artistic freedom.

In 1981, Pursey collaborated with Peter Gabriel on the single "Animals Have More Fun" which was commercially unsuccessful. He also became occupied with video production in London, making use of snippets of found video in an effort "to do something really anarchic."

Rick Goldstein, Dave Parsons, and Dave Tregunna joined the 1980s glam punk/gothic rock band the Wanderers with Stiv Bators of the Dead Boys. Tregunna and Bators later recruited Nick Turner of the Barracudas and Brian James of the Damned to form the Lords of the New Church.

=== 1987 and later ===
In 1987 Pursey and Parsons resurrected Sham 69 with new members; Ian Whitewood on drums, Andy Prince on bass, Tony Hardie-Bick ("Tony Bic") on keyboards and Linda Paganelli on saxophone, releasing the album Volunteer and the singles "Rip and Tear" and "Outside the Warehouse". The album Live at CBGB's also features this line-up. The next studio album, Information Libre, has Patricia de Mayo on keyboards. Andy Prince went on to join the Magic Mushroom Band, and Whitewood was replaced on drums by Sonny Boy Williamson, who played on the Soapy Water and Mister Marmalade album and the singles "Uptown", "Action Time & Vision" and "Girlfriend".

=== 2006 break-up and aftermath ===
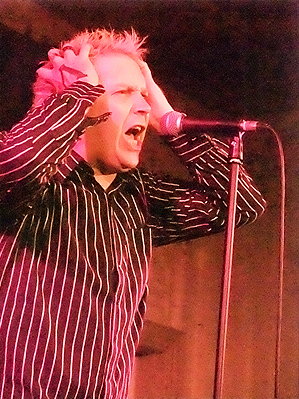
Tim V performing with the band in 2008

In late 2006, Sham 69 broke up and Dave Parsons stated his wish to independently continue as 'Sham 69'. On 26 January 2007, BBC News announced that Sham 69 had split because of a bitter fallout between Pursey and Parsons. NME reported that a statement released by Parsons included the message: "Sham 69 have left Jimmy Pursey on the eve of their 30th anniversary. The band had become increasingly fed up with Jimmy's lack of interest in playing live and continually letting down both promoters and fans by pulling out of gigs at the last moment". Parsons and Whitewood continued as Sham 69 with Tim V on vocals and Rob Jefferson on bass. This line-up performed tours of the United States, played at many punk festivals across Europe, and released the album, Hollywood Hero, in August 2007.

Pursey and Sargent formed a new band Day 21 with Rev & Snell from Towers of London. The band was named after the last Sham 69 album and also to avoid confusion with the fans over the name. Day 21 recorded an album titled 4:10am which was not released, although a CD single, "'Aving It Rock 'N' Roll", was released in 2009.

Bassist Rob Jefferson left Parsons' Sham 69 and was replaced by the former U.K. Subs member Alan Campbell. In 2009, Sham 69 was the first major punk band to tour China. They released an album titled Who Killed Joe Public, in late 2010.

=== 2011–present ===
In May 2011, Parsons stated on his website that he had disbanded Sham 69, although this was disputed by the other members. In July 2011, Pursey announced on Twitter the re-formation of most of the 1977 line-up, comprising Pursey, Parsons and Tregunna. This meant that there were two active bands using the same name, with three of the classic line-up (Pursey, Parsons and Tregunna) in one band, and Harris in the other. In June 2012, Pursey registered the name as a trademark. As of 2016, both bands were still touring using the name, with the Pursey version often using the "Original 1977 line-up" tagline, and the other using the "Tim V" name.

On 28 January 2018, Sham 69 co-founder Neil Harris died from cancer at the age of 63. Drummer Robin Guy died from cancer on 12 September 2024, at the age of 54.

== Legacy ==
Sham 69 have been cited as a major influence on the Oi! musical subgenre of UK punk in the late 1970s, and also on the working class street punk musical subgenre of the 1980s.

== Members ==
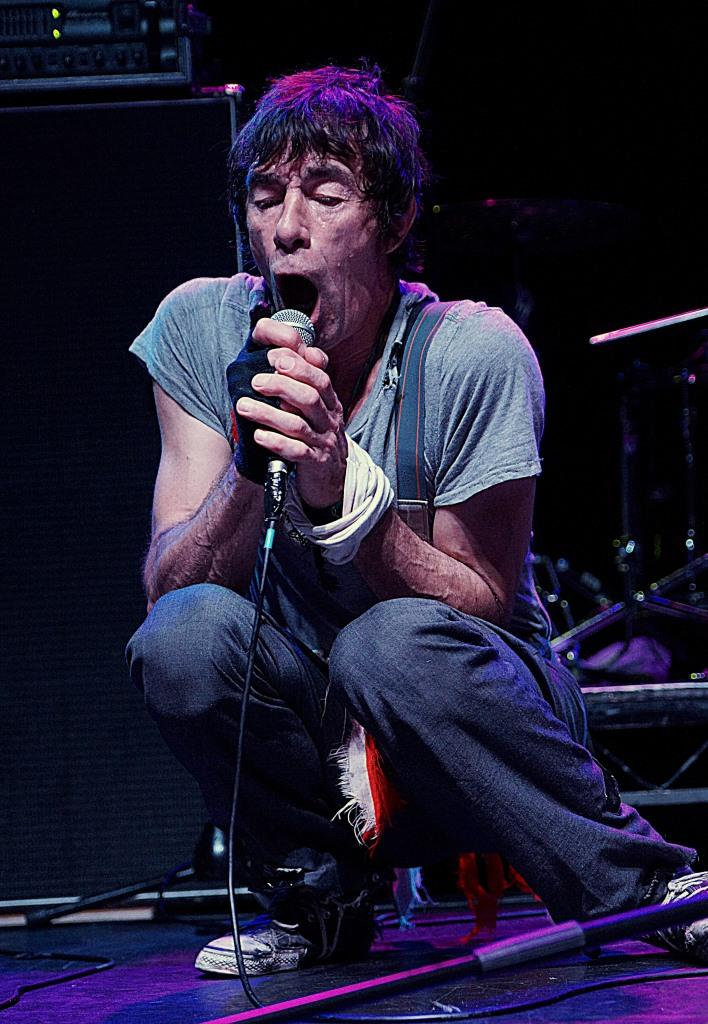
Pursey

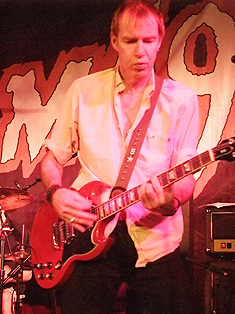
Parsons

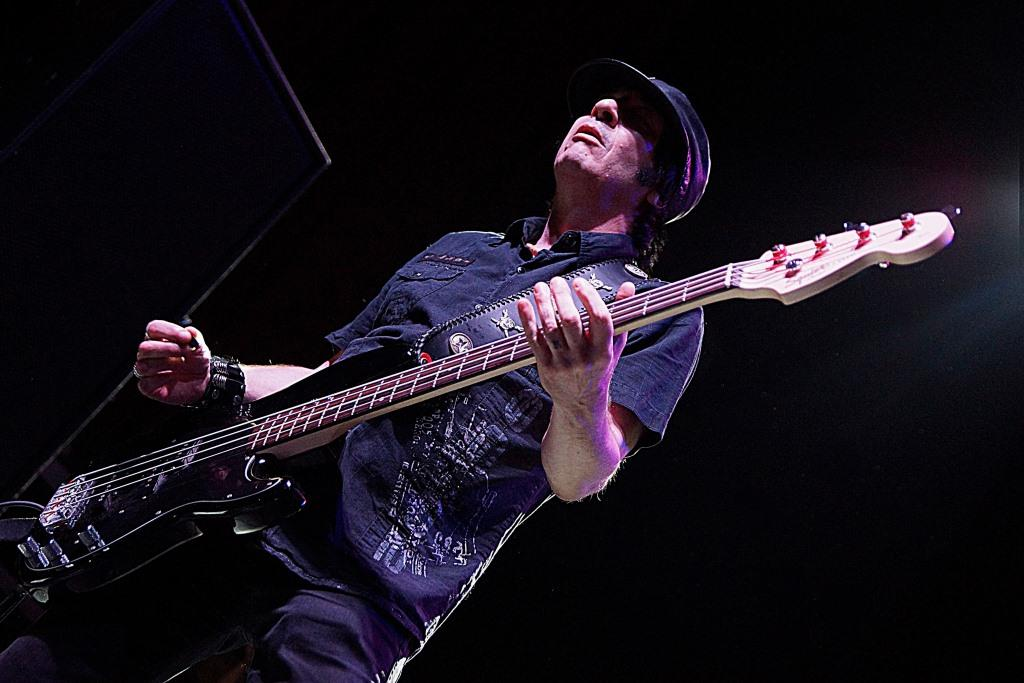
Tregunna

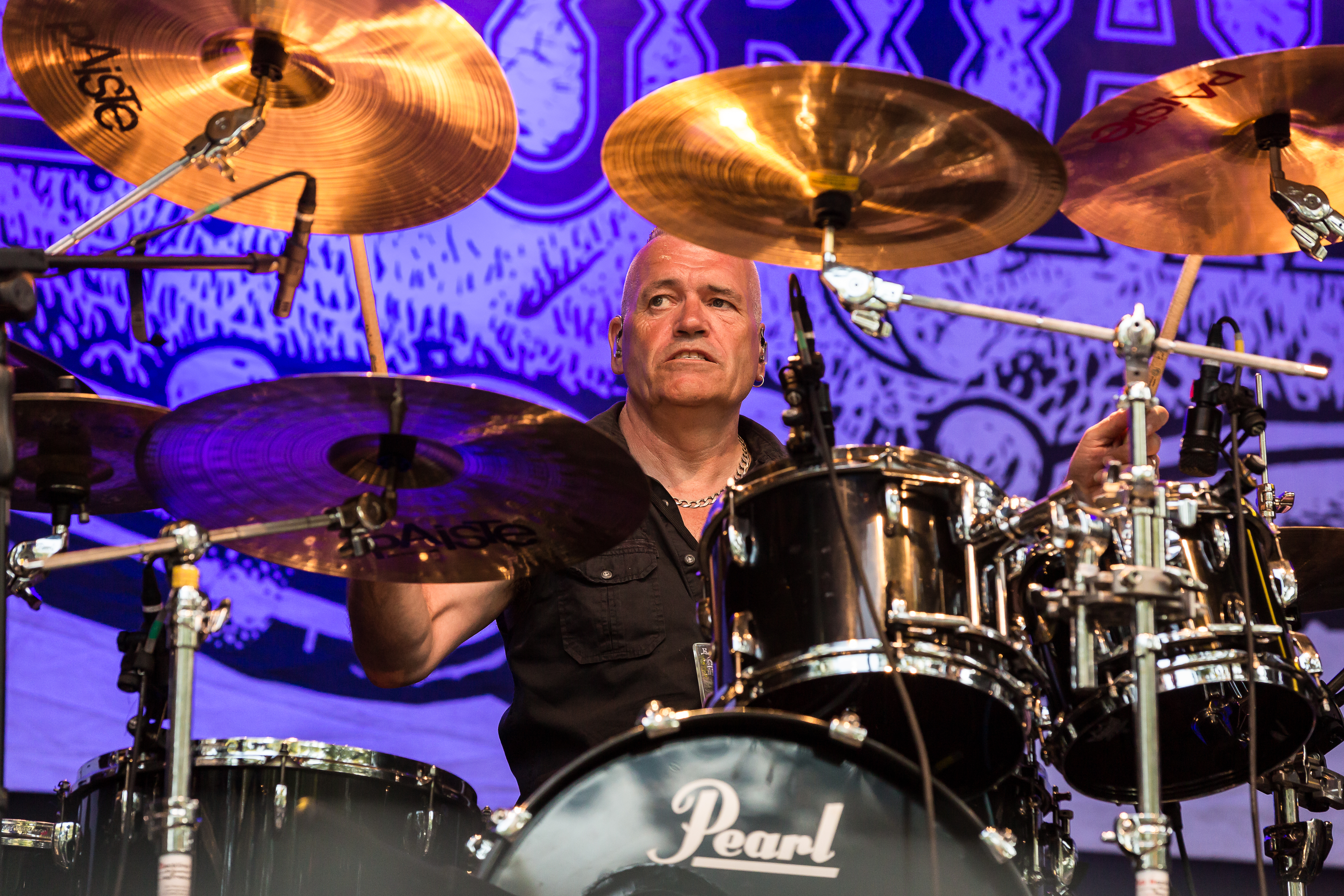
Smith

=== Current line-up ===
- Jimmy Pursey – vocals (1975–1980, 1987–2006, 2011–present)
- Dave Parsons – guitar, backing vocals (1977–1980, 1987–present)
- Dave Tregunna – bass, backing vocals (1977–1980, 2011–present)
- Spike T. Smith – drums (2023–present)

=== Former members ===
- Neil Harris – guitar (1975–1977; died 2018)
- John Goode – guitar (1975–1977)
- Albie Slider (Albert Maskell) – bass (1975–1977)
- Billy Bostik – drums (1975–1977)
- Mark Cain – drums (1977–1979)
- Ricky Goldstein – drums (1979–1980)
- Andy Prince – bass (1987–1993)
- Mat Sargent – bass (1994–2006)
- Ian Whitewood – drums (1987–2011)
- Tim V – vocals (2007–2011)
- Rob Jefferson – bass, backing vocals (2007–2009)
- Al Campbell – bass (2009–2011)
- Danny Fury – drums (2011–2012)
- Robin Guy – drums (2012–2023; died 2024)

=== Tim V version ===
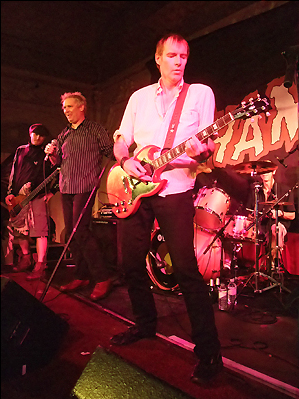
Tim V's version performing in 2008

==== Current members ====
- Tim V – vocals (2007–present)
- Paul Brightman – guitar (2014-present)
- Chris James – bass (2024–present)
- Ian J Allison – drums (2026–present)

==== Former members ====
- Dave Parsons – guitar, backing vocals (2007–2011)
- Neil Harris – guitar (2011–2018; died 2018)
- Tony Feedback – guitar (2011–2014)
- Rob Jefferson – bass, backing vocals (2007–2009)
- Al Campbell – bass (2009–2011)
- John Woodward – bass (2011–2016)
- Ryan Monshall – bass (2016–2021)
- Tom Austin-Morgan – bass (2021-2023)
- Ian Whitewood – drums (2007–2023)
- Chris Bashford – drums (2024–2026)

== Discography ==
=== Albums ===
Title	Year	UK
Tell Us the Truth	1978	25
That's Life	1978	27
The Adventures of the Hersham Boys	1979	8
The Game	1980	—
Volunteer	1988	—
Information Libre	1991	—
Kings & Queens	1993	—
Soapy Water and Mister Marmalade	1995	—
The A Files	1997	—
Direct Action: Day 21	2001	—
Hollywood Hero (U.S.) (a.k.a. Western Culture (UK / Europe))	2007	—
Who Killed Joe Public	2010	—
Their Finest Hour	2013	—
It'll End in Tears	2015	—
Black Dog	2021	—
To the Ends of the Earth	2024	—
"—" denotes releases that did not chart.

=== Singles ===
Date of issue	A-side	B-side	Label	Catalogue #	Album	UK
October 1977	"I Don't Wanna"	"Red London" / "Ulster"	Step Forward	SF 4	—N/a	—
1977	"Song of the Streets" (aka "What Have We Got")	—N/a	(self released)		—N/a	—
January 1978	"Borstal Breakout"	"Hey Little Rich Boy"	Polydor	2058 966	Tell Us the Truth	59 (Note: Chart position is from the official UK "Breakers List".)
April 1978	"Angels with Dirty Faces"	"Cockney Kids Are Innocent"	Polydor	2059 023	That's Life	19
July 1978	"If the Kids Are United"	"Sunday Morning Nightmare"	Polydor	2059 05	—N/a	9
October 1978	"Hurry Up Harry"	"No Entry"	Polydor	POSP 7	That's Life	10
March 1979	"Questions and Answers"	"Gotta Survive" (live) / "With a Little Help from My Friends"	Polydor	POSP 27	The Adventures of the Hersham Boys	18
July 1979	"Hersham Boys"	"I Don't Wanna" (live) / "Tell Us the Truth" (live) "Rip Off (Live)" / "I'm A Man, I'm A Boy (Live)"	Polydor	POSP 64	The Adventures of the Hersham Boys	6
October 1979	"You're a Better Man Than I"	"Give a Dog a Bone"	Polydor	POSP 82	The Adventures of the Hersham Boys	49
March 1980	"Tell the Children"	"Jack"	Polydor	POSP 136	The Game	45
June 1980	"Unite and Win"	"I'm a Man"	Polydor	2059 259	The Game	—
July 1987	"Rip and Tear"	"The Great American Slowdown"	Legacy	LGY 69	Volunteer	181
February 1988	"Outside the Warehouse"	"Outside the Warehouse" (version)	Legacy	LGY 71	Volunteer	—
March 1993	"Uptown"	"Borstal Breakout"	C.M.P.	CMP 1T	Information Libre	—
October 1993	"Action Time & Vision"	"Bosnia" / "Hey Little Rich Boy" / "Reggae Giro"	C.M.P.	CMCCD 002	Kings & Queens	—
1995	"Girlfriend"	"25 Years" / "Rainbow Warrior (Greenpeace)"	Red Cat	AISCD 001	Soapy Water and Mister Marmalade	—
1996	"Swampy (Run to the Forest)"	"Geoffrey Thomas" / "Studenthead" / "Window Stare"	Cleopatra	AI CD 005	The A Files	—
1996	”Listen Up"	”25 Years"	Empty Records	MT-359	Soapy Water and Mister Marmalade	—
2006	"Hurry Up England"	—N/a	Parlophone	CDR 6704	—N/a	10
"—" denotes releases that did not chart or were not released in that territory.

=== Compilation albums ===
- The First, the Best and the Last (1980)
- The Punk Singles Collection 1977–80 (1998)
- Angels With Dirty Faces 2-CD Anthology (1999) (Castle Music ESDCD 780)
- Laced Up Boots and Corduroys (2000)
- If The Kids Are United - The Best of Sham 69 (2001)
- The Best of Sham 69: Cockney Kids Are Innocent (2002)
- The Complete Collection: 3-disc (2004)
- Sham 69 - Set List: The Anthology (Re-recorded Greatest Hits on CD & LP) - Secret Records
- Hurry Up Harry: The Collection (2017)

=== Compilation appearances ===
- Lords of Oi! (1997)
- Teenage Kicks (4 April 2005)
- The Original Punk Album (2007)
- Punk 77/2007 30th Anniversary (2007)*
- DOA movie, Rip Off Performed by Sham 69; recorded live at Roundhouse Studios

"Borstal Breakout" Performed by Sham 69; recorded live at Roundhouse Studios (1981)

=== Live albums ===
- Live and Loud!! (1987)
- The Complete Sham 69 Live (1989)
- Live at the Roxy Club (1990)
- Live in Italy (1996)
- Live at CBGB's (1998)
- Green Eggs & Sham (1999)
- SHAM 69 Live (2011)
