= Hersham Boys =

Single by Sham 69

from the album The Adventures of the Hersham Boys
- B-side: "I Don't Wanna (live)"/"Tell Us The Truth (live)"
- Released: 26 July 1979
- Recorded: 12 February 1978, June 1979
- Genre: Punk rock
- Length: 3:25 (7" single edit); 4:46 (album version)
- Label: Polydor (POSP 64)
- Songwriter(s): Jimmy Pursey, Dave Guy Parsons
- Producer(s): Peter Wilson, Jimmy Pursey

Sham 69 singles chronology
"Questions and Answers" (1979)	"Hersham Boys" (1979)	"You're a Better Man Than I" (1979)

"Hersham Boys" is a single released by English punk rock band Sham 69 in 1979 from their third studio album The Adventures of the Hersham Boys. It was the band's biggest and most well-known hit, peaking at number six on the UK Singles Chart and at nine on the Irish Singles Chart. This success was despite the song's poor review in pop magazine Smash Hits; music journalist David Hepworth described the song as "A tired, hollow effort struggling between weary attempts at rabble-rousing and blush-making pseudo-Springsteen 'street' songs that reek of desperation and contract fulfilling. As empty self-satisfied a record as anything they supposedly set out to replace". The song is included on live and compilation albums. Two live tracks, "I Don't Wanna (live)" and "Tell Us The Truth (live)" appear as b-sides on this single, recorded in 1978. In the music video the sign that Pursey, the rest of Sham 69 and a young boy are sitting next to is the sign for Hersham Road.

== Track listing (7 inch) ==
Side one

1. "Hersham Boys" - 3:25

Side two

1. "I Don't Wanna (live)" - 2:06
2. "Tell Us The Truth (live)" - 2:06

== Track listing (12 inch) ==
Side one

1. "Hersham Boys (long version)" - 4:46

Side two

1. "I Don't Wanna (live)" - 2:06
2. "Rip Off (Live)" - 2:43
3. "I'm A Man, I'm A Boy (Live)" - 2:10
4. "Tell Us The Truth (live)" - 2:06
