= Angels with Dirty Faces (Sham 69 song) =

Single by Sham 69

from the album That's Life
- B-side: "Cockney Kids Are Innocent"
- Released: April 1978
- Recorded: late 1977
- Genre: Punk rock, new wave
- Length: 2:28
- Label: Polydor (2059 023)
- Songwriter(s): Jimmy Pursey, Dave Guy Parsons
- Producer(s): Peter Wilson, Jimmy Pursey

Sham 69 singles chronology
"'Borstal Breakout'" (1978)	"Angels with Dirty Faces" (1978)	"'If the Kids Are United'" (1978)

"Angels with Dirty Faces" is a single by English punk rock band Sham 69 from their second studio album That's Life. The single was backed by B-side hit "Cockney Kids are Innocent". The song was released as a 7" vinyl single in 1978 and 12" single in 1982. It reached number 19 on the UK Singles Chart for 10 weeks. "Angels with Dirty Faces" was written and produced by lead vocalist Jimmy Pursey, guitarist Dave Parsons of Sham 69 and Peter Wilson and it only charted in the UK. The song also features on compilations The First, the Best and the Last (1980) and The Punk Singles Collection 1977-80 (1998) and appears on live albums including Live and Loud (1987), The Complete Sham 69 Live (1989) and Live at the Roxy Club (1990). The band performed the song on the BBC television show Top of the Pops.

== Track listing ==
Side one

1. "Angels with Dirty Faces"

Side two

1. "Cockney Kids Are Innocent

== Chart performance ==
Chart (1978)	Peak position
UK Singles (OCC)	19
