= Tell Us the Truth =

Studio album by Sham 69
- Released: February 1978
- Venue: Marquee Club, 90 Wardour Street, London; The Vortex, 203 Wardour Street, London
- Studio: Polydor, London; Pathway, London; Basing Street, London
- Genre: Punk rock
- Length: 34:52
- Label: Polydor; Sire
- Producer: Jimmy Pursey; Peter Wilson

Sham 69 chronology
Tell Us the Truth (1978)	That's Life (1978)

Professional ratings
Review scores
Source	Rating
AllMusic	4.5/5 stars
Christgau's Record Guide	B

Tell Us the Truth is the debut album by English punk rock band Sham 69, released in 1978. The first side of the album was recorded live in concert, while the other was recorded in the studio. Tell Us the Truth includes one of Sham 69's biggest hits, "Borstal Breakout", on the live side of the album. The album peaked at number 25 on the UK Albums Chart.

Tell Us the Truth and the band's second album That's Life were re-released in 1989 as a double LP.

== Track listing ==
All songs written by Jimmy Pursey and Dave Parsons

Live side

1. "We Got a Fight"
2. "Rip Off"
3. "Ulster"
4. "George Davis Is Innocent"
5. "They Don’t Understand"
6. "Borstal Breakout"
  Studio side
7. "Family Life"
8. "Hey Little Rich Boy"
9. "I’m a Man, I’m a Boy"
10. "What About the Lonely?"
11. "Tell Us the Truth"
12. "It’s Never Too Late"
13. "Who's Generation!"
  Captain Oi! bonus tracks
14. "What Have We Got" (live)
15. "I Don't Wanna" produced by John Cale
16. "Red London" produced by John Cale
17. "Ulster" (single version) produced by John Cale
18. "Borstal Breakout" (single version)
19. "George Davis Is Innocent" (demo) produced by Howard Thompson and Sham 69; engineered by Steve Lillywhite
20. "They Don't Understand" (demo) produced by Howard Thompson and Sham 69; engineered by Steve Lillywhite
21. "Borstal Breakout" (demo) produced by Howard Thompson and Sham 69; engineered by Steve Lillywhite
- Tracks 15–17 released as "I Don't Wanna" single on Step Forward
- "Borstal Breakout" released as Polydor Records debut single, January 1978

== Personnel ==
Sham 69

- Jimmy Pursey – vocals, production, liner notes
- Dave Parsons – guitars, liner notes
- Dave "Kermit" Tregunna – bass guitar
- Mark "Dodie" Cain – drums

with:

- Albie "Slider" Maskell – bass guitar on tracks 15–17 and 19–21

Technical

- Peter Wilson – production
- Brian Burrows – remixing
- Steve Hammonds – project coordinator
- Jo Mirowski – art direction, design
- Alwyn Clayden – package design
- Martyn Goddard – photography
- Barry Plummer – photography

== Charts ==
Chart (1978)	Peak position
UK Albums (OCC)	25

== Release history ==
Region	Date	Label	Format	Catalog	Notes
UK	1978	Polydor Records	LP	2383 491	
US	1978	Sire Records	LP	SRK 6060	
UK	1996	Dojo Records	CD	DOJO CD 256	Features one bonus track ("What Have We Got (live)")
US	1996	Dojo Records	CD	DOJO 3000-2	Features one bonus track ("What Have We Got (live)")
UK	2000	Castle Music	CD	CMRCD 020	Features two bonus tracks ("What Have We Got" and "Borstal Breakout (single version)")
UK	2005	Captain Oi!	CD	AHOY DPX 611	Features eight bonus tracks
