= If the Kids Are United =

1978 single by Sham 69

Single by Sham 69
- B-side: "Sunday Morning Nightmare"
- Released: July 1978
- Genre: Punk rock
- Label: Polydor (2059 050)
- Songwriter(s): Dave Guy Parsons and Jimmy Pursey

Sham 69 singles chronology
| "Angels with Dirty Faces" (1978) | "If the Kids Are United" (1978) | "Hurry Up Harry" (1978) |

"If the Kids Are United"

Single by Die Toten Hosen featuring Jimmy Pursey

from the album Learning English, Lesson One
- Released: 1992
- Genre: Punk rock
- Length: 3:08
- Label: Virgin
- Songwriter(s): Dave Guy Parsons and Jimmy Pursey

Die Toten Hosen singles chronology
| "Whole Wide World" (1992) | "If the Kids Are United" (1992) | "Mehr davon" (1992) |

"If the Kids Are United" is a song by English punk rock band Sham 69. The single, backed by the B-side "Sunday Morning Nightmare", was a success and reached number 9 in the UK Singles Chart in July 1978. The song was also featured on their 1980 compilation album, The First, the Best and the Last. The song was covered by the German punk rock band Die Toten Hosen in 1991 for their cover album Learning English, Lesson One. Released as a single in 1992, it features Jimmy Pursey as a guest musician. Both the B-sides are Sham 69 covers. The CD single is designed to resemble a sawtooth.

”If the Kids Are United” featured in episode 2 of season 2 of SAS: Rogue Heroes.

"If the Kids Are United" also features on many other compilation and live albums, and it has been covered by many artists and bands such as Wat Tyler, Rancid, 7 Seconds, Oi Polloi, DJ Paul, Angelic Upstarts, Red Alert, Bérurier Noir, Sham Pistols, The Kids, Les Ramoneurs de Menhirs, Mama's Boys, Atari Teenage Riot, The Duke Spirit, Jarvis Cocker, and Pluramon.

== Track listing ==
Side one

1. "If the Kids Are United"

Side two

1. "Sunday Morning Nightmare"

== Track listing (Die Toten Hosen single) ==
1. "If the Kids Are United"
2. "Individual"
3. "Blackpool"
