= Jimmy Pursey =

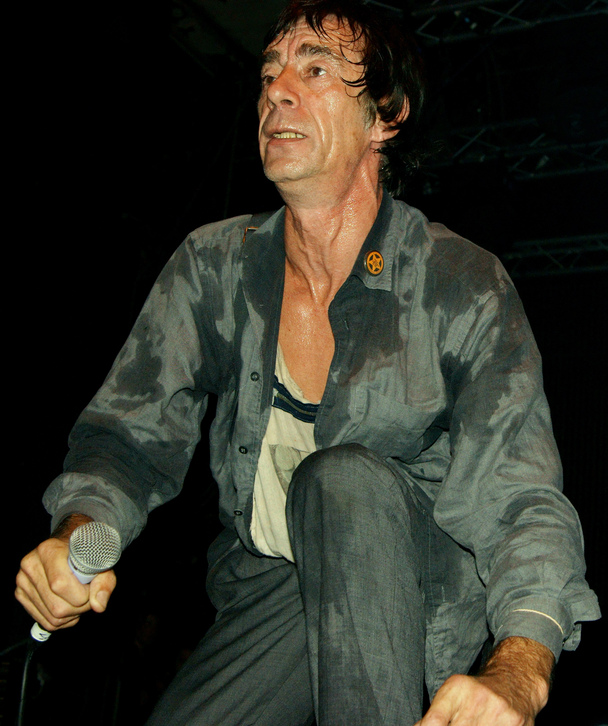
- Jimmy Pursey performing in London on 14 July 2012

Background information
- Born: James Timothy Pursey; 9 February 1955 (age 71); Hersham, Surrey, England, United Kingdom
- Genres: Punk rock, post-punk (solo career)
- Occupations: Musician, record producer
- Instrument: Vocals
- Years active: 1976–present

James Timothy Pursey (born 9 February 1955) is an English rock musician. He is the founder and frontman of the punk rock band Sham 69, which he has performed with since 1976, along with releasing material as a solo artist.

== Early life ==
Pursey was born in Hersham, in the county of Surrey on 9 February 1955. His father was a plumber and former British Army soldier, and his mother worked as a cinema usherette. He received his education at Hersham House & Burhill Infants, Hersham Juniors, and at Rydens School, which he left at the age of 15 to work in a curtain shop. In his youth he was a regular attender at the local disco, the Walton Hop at the Playhouse Theatre, where he met the record producer Jonathan King. He began performing in public after taking the stage as a drunk fourteen-year-old at the disco, miming to Bay City Rollers and Rolling Stones songs.

== Career ==
In 1976 while working at Wimbledon Greyhound Stadium with Albie Slider, Billy Bostik and Neil Harris, having been inspired by the music of The Ramones, Pursey formed a punk rock band called 'Jimmy and the Ferrets', which went on to become 'Sham 69'. The band initially rehearsed at Slider's parents' pig farm, where Jonathan King sometimes came to watch them, considering the option of becoming the act's promoter. Before securing a record contract the lineup changed, with Harris and Bostock being replaced by Dave Parsons and Mark Cain. Slider left shortly afterwards and was replaced by Dave Tregunna on the bass guitar.

Sham 69 went on to release four long-players via Polydor Records, and had six UK top 50 singles before they broke up in 1980, with the violence that regularly marred their gigs having taken a toll on the band.

Pursey set up a short-lived new band with Steve Jones and Paul Cook, formerly of The Sex Pistols, titled the "Sham Pistols", before embarking on a solo career. He also worked around this period as a record producer on the early releases by Cockney Rejects, and the Angelic Upstarts.

His first solo material was released via Polydor Records, being the single Lucky Man (1980), and a long-player entitled Imagination Camouflage (1980), recorded with Derwood Andrews and Mark Laff, formerly of Generation X as session musicians, who also received co-writing credits for two of the LP's songs. Pursey then moved to Epic Records for three further singles releases, including "Animals Have More Fun" (1981), co-written with Peter Gabriel, and a second solo LP entitled Alien Orphan (1981). In 1983, a third long-player, entitled Revenge is not the Password, was released on the Code Black label. He later released a fourth solo album entitled Code Black (1997).

In 1986 Pursey reformed Sham 69 with Dave Parsons, and a new line-up. The band continued to play live and record until 2006. In 2006, Pursey recorded a new version of the Sham 69 hit "Hurry Up Harry" as an unofficial World Cup song in aid of a cancer charity; "Hurry Up England" was recorded with Graham Coxon's band but credited to 'Sham 69 & the Special Assembly'. In January 2007 the band broke up. NME reported that a statement released by Parsons included the message: "Sham 69 have left Jimmy Pursey on the eve of their 30th anniversary." Pursey initially stated that he would be retaining the Sham 69 name, but in January 2008, he announced that: "to avoid confusion to fans he wanted it known that he did not want to be associated with the band still performing as Sham 69". In 2008 he set up a new band titled Day 21 with Mat Sargent on bass, The Rev (Towers of London and The Prodigy) on guitar, and Snell (Towers of London). In July 2011 Pursey reformed Sham 69 again with the band's late 1970s members. At a meeting held between Pursey and Dave Parsons, original Sham 69 guitarist and co-writer of nearly all of the Sham repertoire with Pursey, the two ironed out their differences. Dave Tregunna, on bass, and Mark Cain, on drums, were called in to complete the original lineup for a show in London.

== Personal life ==
Pursey lives in the Surrey town of Chertsey. He is a part-time artist, and has been known to sell paintings to raise funding for the Hersham Hounds Greyhound Sanctuary.

In 2002, Pursey received a police caution for indecent assault, after admitting to forcibly kissing a teenage girl in Weybridge, Surrey.

In May 2005 there was a disturbance at The Head art gallery in Brighton, when Pursey interrupted an art show opening drinks party and removed a number of his paintings from the display after a disagreement with the curator over them.

== Discography ==
=== Solo ===
==== Albums ====
- Imagination Camouflage (1980), Polydor
- Alien Orphan (1981), Epic
- Revenge is not the Password (1983), Code Black
- Code Black (1997), Scratch

==== Singles ====
- "Lucky Man" (1980), Polydor
- "Animals Have More Fun" (1981), Epic
- "Naughty Boys Like Naughty Girls" (1981), Epic
- "Alien Orphan" (1982), Epic
- "The First Deadly Sin" (1982), Epic
- "Man Worries Man" (1983), Code Black
- " Eyes Shine Killidoscope" (1983), Young Limbs Numb Hymns (as James T. Pursey)
- "If Only Before" (1984), An Eskimo - credited to James T. Pursey
- "Zap Pow!" (1986), Vide Cat
