= Mustapha Khayati =

Tunisian member of the Situationist International

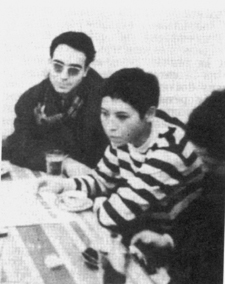
Mustapha Khayati with Alice Becker-Ho, 1966.

Mustapha Khayati is a Tunisian social critic, and was a member of the Situationist International in the 1960s.

Though collaborating with other Situationists, he was the chief author of the pamphlet De la misère en milieu étudiant considérée sous ses aspects économique, politique, psychologique, sexuelet notamment intellectuel et de quelques moyens pour y remédier (English: On the Poverty of Student Life Considered in Its Economic, Political, Psychological, Sexual, and Especially Intellectual Aspects, With a Modest Proposal for Doing Away With It, aka On the Poverty of Student Life). This pamphlet has been translated into English by Chris Gray and Ken Knabb.

Ten thousand copies of On the Poverty of Student Life were printed at the expense of the Association Fédérative Générale des Étudiants de Strasbourg. Attacking the miserable conditions and subservient attitudes of university students and student radicals in capitalist societies, the pamphlet caused significant uproar, helped in the dissemination of Situationist ideas, and contributed to the emergence of the movement of May 1968 in France.

In October 1969, Khayati resigned from the Situationist International to join the Democratic Front for the Liberation of Palestine in Jordan. He returned to Europe in August 1970, publishing the text En attendant le massacre (English: Waiting for the Massacre) about the coming Black September in the Trotskyist journal An Nidhal.
