= Ronald Hunt =

Ronald Hunt may refer to:

- Ronald Hunt (art historian) (born 1936), English art historian
- Ronald Hunt (politician) (1897–1968), Australian politician
- Ronald Hunt (wrestler) (born 1929), Australian wrestler

== See also ==
- Ron Hunt (disambiguation)
- Ronald Leigh-Hunt (1920–2005), British film and television actor
- Ronald Hunte (1883–?), Guyanese cricketer
