= King Mob =

1960s–1970s radical group in London, England

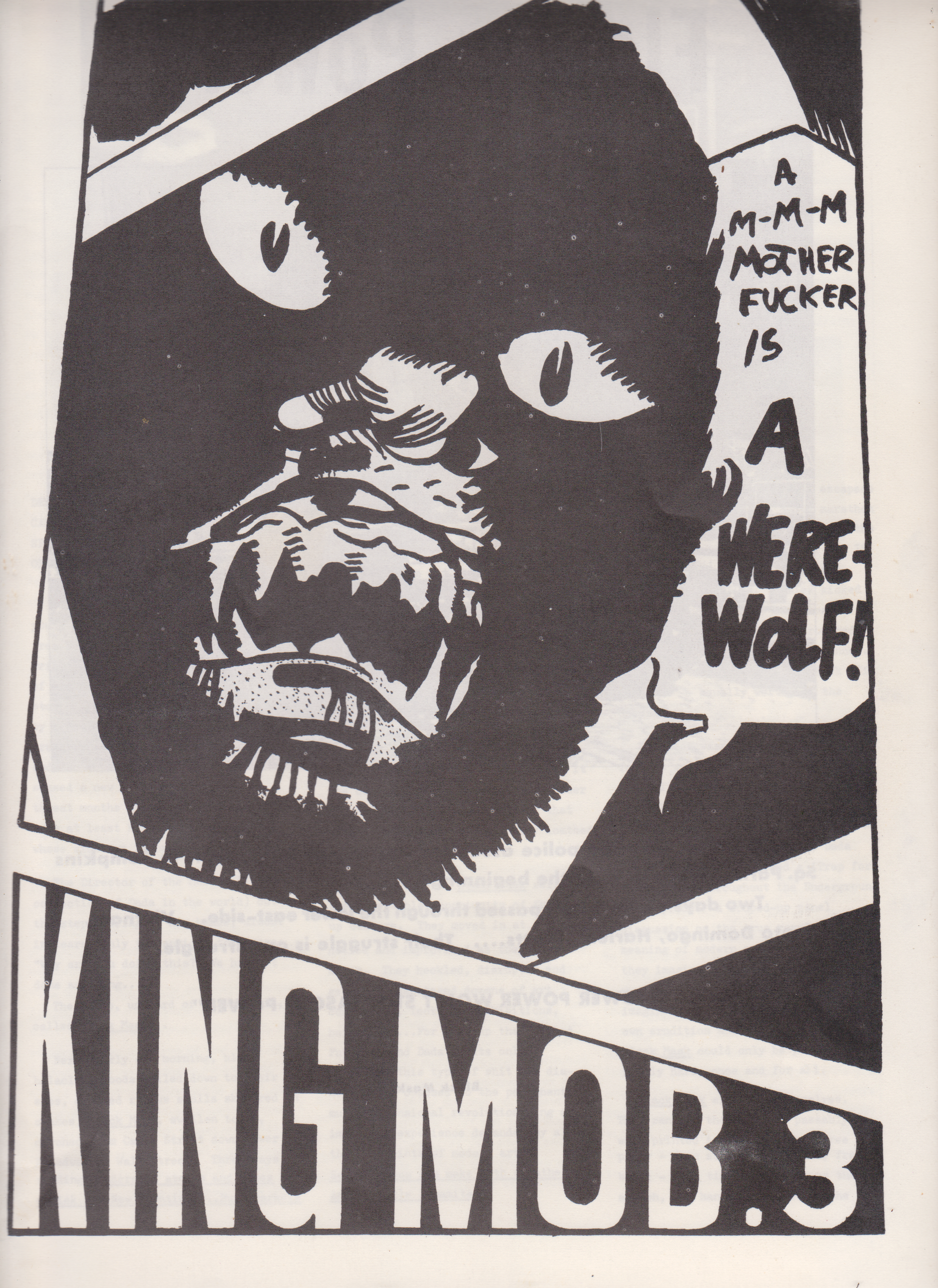
- Cover page of the King Mob Echo №3, 1968
- Years active: 1960s–1970s
- Location: London
- Major figures: David Wise, Stuart Wise, TJ Clark, Chris Gray, Donald Nicholson-Smith
- Influences: Situationist International; UAW/MF

King Mob was an English radical group based in London during the late 1960s and early 1970s. Influences on the group included the Situationist International and the New York City group Black Mask / UAW/MF. It derived its name from Christopher Hibbert's 1958 book on the Gordon Riots of June 1780, in which rioters daubed the slogan "His Majesty King Mob" on the walls of Newgate Prison, after gutting the building.

== Background ==
Twins David and Stuart Wise were born in Newcastle-upon-Tyne in September 1943. In the mid-1960s, as students at Newcastle University School of Art, they were associated with what they later called ‘the often confusedly anti-art magazine’, Icteric, founded in 1966.

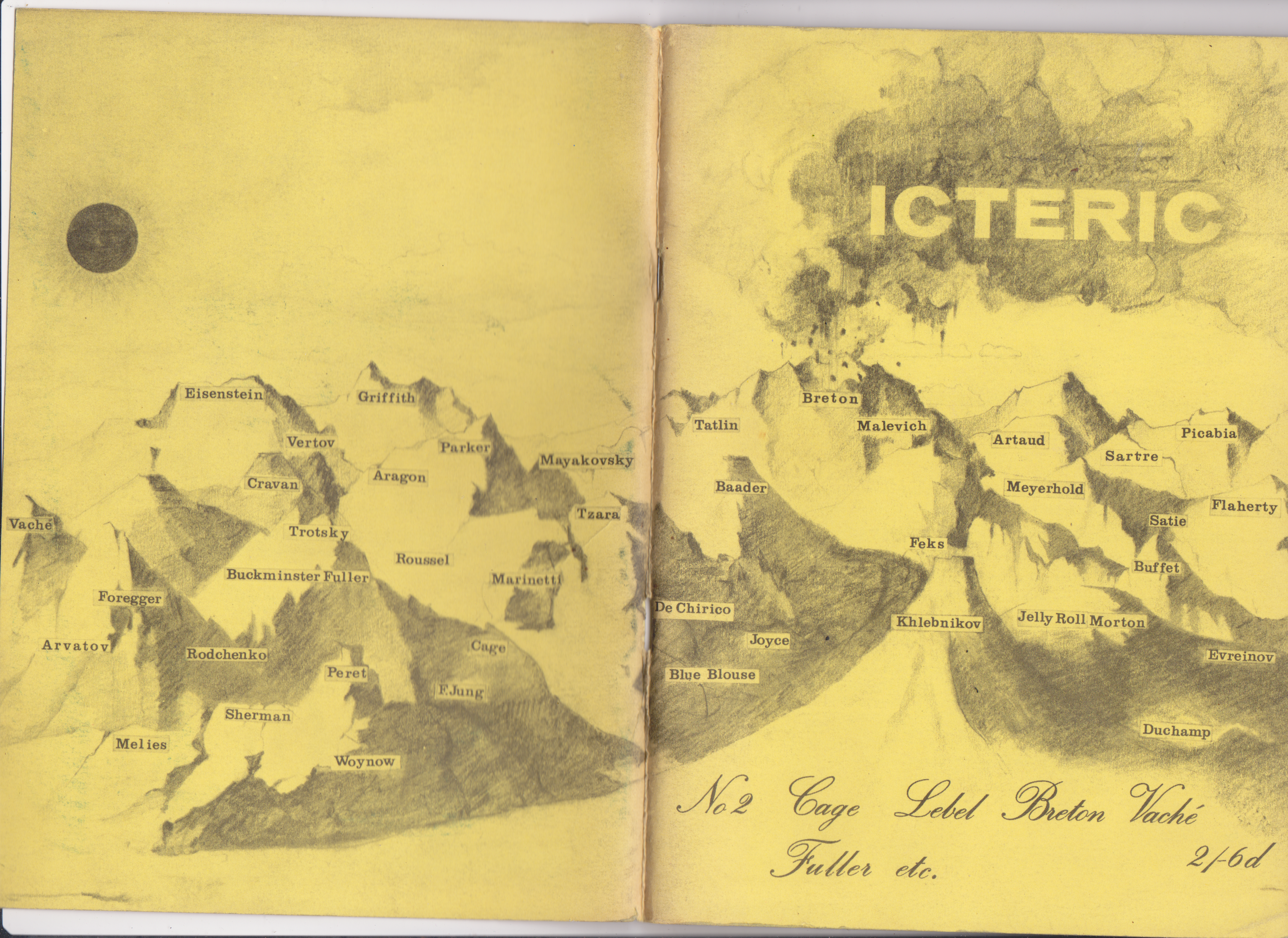
Icteric magazine 1966

The purported aim of Icteric was the ‘fusion’ of ‘art and life’. It was mainly the brainchild of Ronald Hunt of the Department of Fine Art at Newcastle University, who had been appointed as librarian courtesy of lecturer and pop artist, Richard Hamilton. Hunt was familiar with the more marginal publications of the international art scene. It was he who first acquainted future Situationist member Donald Nicholson-Smith with the theoretical journals of the French Situationists. Hunt also learned of the activities of the Black Mask group in New York, such as their intervention at a meeting in a plush art gallery shouting, ‘burn the museums baby’, ‘art is dead’, ‘Museum closed’ etc.

Dave Wise recalls: "Soon letters were sent out to New York and we got replies immediately: 'brothers/sisters come and join us'! So two of us (Dave Wise and Anne Ryder) went from Newcastle to New York via London, and in the summer of 1967 engaged in some of the activities of Black Mask. Ben Morea gave them the personal addresses and telephone numbers of Situationist sympathisers who resided in London. We duly contacted on them on our return to England. They were the people around the magazine Heatwave." Four of them formed the English section of the Situationist International, namely: Timothy Clark, Christopher Gray and Donald Nicholson-Smith and Charles Radcliffe

Heatwave was the first magazine to put the new revolt of youth into some kind of perspective, with specific reference to Mods and Rockers, Beats, Dutch Provos and the like by Gray and Radcliffe; affirming their vandalistic acts of destruction as something which could have real future consequences, leading a 'positive project'. There were numerous articles on Dadaism, Surrealism, and on the Situationist concept of Unitary Urbanism.

What resulted was, in Dave Wise's recollection, was a ‘meeting - if you like – between north and south’: between the Wise twins and friends, and the English section of the Situationists. In this new grouping the ideas of the Situationists and their predecessors were discussed in depth. For a year plans were made and collaborators sought out; things seemed promising. Then after SI member Raoul Vaneigem report to founder of the Situationist International Guy Debord on a trip he made to New York in late-1967, the SI expelled the English Section.

According to Dave Wise: 'Principally, Vaneigem objected to Alan Hoffman, a kind of mystical but political acidhead who'd started to show an interest in Black Mask... Also, Ben had a serious liver complaint and he couldn't touch alcohol, thus acid went down very nicely... Ben was inevitably very upset... and started raving on in letters about the man-of-letters disposition Vaneigem put across, accusing him of not knowing anything about those at the bottom of the pile and street life in general. This created quite a dilemma in London as Chris Gray and Don N Smith in particular wanted to keep all the newfound friendships here alive and kicking. Knowing our friendliness with Ben Morea, they didn't want to cause too many upsets before things could really get underway in terms of doing something together. Presumably because of their prevarication, they were excluded from the Situationists and the rest, so to speak [again], is history... Out of this lacunae and initial disorientation followed by a kind of re-think, King Mob developed.’

== Activities ==
The group published five issues of its journal King Mob Echo as well as many posters and leaflets. One of King Mob's first actions took place in April 1968. Members of the group, including one dressed in a gorilla costume and two in a pantomime horse outfit, led a procession of local people to Powis Square where the fences enclosing a private garden space were demolished in protest at a lack of play areas for children in the area. Several arrests followed, but the action resulted in further protests culminating in the local council purchasing the square for public use.

In December 1968, inspired by the New York-based Black Mask's "mill-in at Macy's", King Mob entered the Selfridges store in London, with one member, dressed as Father Christmas, attempting to distribute all of the store's toys to children. Police subsequently forced the children to return the toys. This action involved Malcolm McLaren who reputedly applied the group's situationist ideas in the promotion of the Sex Pistols. King Mob also allegedly made plans for a series of other actions, including blowing up a waterfall in the Lake District, painting the poet Wordsworth's house with the words "Coleridge Lives", and hanging peacocks in Holland Park, London. However, none of the aforementioned plans were executed.

Graffiti attributed to King Mob was observed in many places, particularly in the Notting Hill area, including, "I don't believe in nothing - I feel like they ought to burn down the world - just let it burn down baby." The most celebrated graffito attributed to King Mob was the slogan which was painted along a half-mile section of the wall beside the tube (railway) commuter route into London between Ladbroke Grove and Westbourne Park tube stations in west London:

"Same thing day after day – tube – work – dinner – work – tube – armchair – TV – sleep – tube – work – how much more can you take? – one in ten go mad – one in five cracks up."

== Legacy ==
Pink Floyd's Roger Waters song "Time" which appeared on Pink Floyd's 1973 album Dark Side Of The Moon was inspired by the "Same Thing Day After Day" graffito. In their book, Sex Pistols: The Inside Story, Fred and Judy Vermorel assert that King Mob had a significant influence on the punk group:

"But if the Sex Pistols stemmed from the Situationist International, their particular twist of radical flash and burlesque rage was also mediated through a band of hooligan pedants based in the Notting Hill Gate area of London. This was King Mob."

King Mob was the inspiration for the principal character of the same name in the 1990s comic strip series The Invisibles by Grant Morrison. An anthology of the original King Mob journal titled King Mob Echo: English Section of the Situationist International was edited by Tom Vague and published by Dark Star and AK Press in 2000. David and Stuart Wise continued to publish material under various guises including BM Bis, BM Blob and then the Revolt Against Plenty and Dialectical Butterflies websites.Stuart Wise died in 2021. Between 2023 and 2025, Dave Wise published five titles on King Mob history for WiseBooks, an imprint of BPC Publishing (details in sources).

== See also ==
- Anti-art
- The Angry Brigade

== Sources ==
- "The End of Music", a pamphlet written by David and Stuart Wise in the mid- to late-1970s and published in Glasgow. The text was later reprinted by AK Press in the 1990s as part of Stewart Home's book What is Situationism? A Reader.
- King Mob. Nosotros, el Partido del Diablo, Spanish compilation of King Mob texts, edited by La Felguera Ediciones in 2007
- The Situationist International in Britain: Modernism, Surrealism, and the Avant-Gardes (Routledge 2016)
- King Mob : A Critical Hidden History by David Wise, Stuart Wise and Nick Brandt (Bread and Circuses 2014)
- Lost Texts Around King Mob by Dave and Stuart Wise with contributions from Ronald Hunt, John Barker, Fred Vermorel, Chris Gray and Phil Meyler (BPC Wisebooks Series No. 1 2024 ) ISBN 979-8882191145
- Dialectical Butterflies: Ecocide, Extinction Rebellion, Greenwash and Rewilding the Commons - an Illustrated Dérive by and Stuart Wise (BPC Wiseebooks Series No. 2–12 March 2024) ISBN 979-8326044242
- King Mob: The Negation and Transcendence of Art: Malevich, Schwitters, Hirst, Banksy, Mayakovsky, Situationists, Tatlin, Fluxus, Black Mask by Dave and Stuart Wise. (BPC Wiseebooks Series No. 3 2024) ISBN 979-8326156655
- A Newcastle Dunciad 1966-2008: Recollections of a Musical and Artistic Avant Garde by Dave and Stuart Wise (BPC/Wisebooks Series No. 4) ISBN 979-8340181282
- Introduction by David Black to King Mob: The Negation and Transcendence of Art. By Dave and Stuart Wise
- Building For Babylon: Construction, Collectives and Craic.
