= King Mob (disambiguation) =

King Mob was a 1970s radical group in London, England.

King Mob may also refer to:

- King Mob (character), a character in Grant Morrison's comic book series The Invisibles
- Kings Mob Productions, a New York-based independent film company
- King Mob, a nickname for Andrew Jackson, seventh president of United States
- King Mob, a 1958 book by Christopher Hibbert based on the Gordon Riots of 1780
