= Student life =

Student life may refer to:

- The everyday life of a student
- Student Life Organization, a student-led society used in SABIS schools
- Student affairs, a department or division of services and support for students at institutions of higher education
- Student Life (newspaper), the student newspaper of Washington University in St. Louis
- Student Life (Utah newspaper), former name for the student newspaper of Utah State University
- Student Life (university ministry), a university ministry in Australia and New Zealand
- The Student Life, the student newspaper of the Claremont Colleges in California
- BBC Student Life, a school support site on the BBC website

== See also ==
- On the Poverty of Student Life, a pamphlet first published by students of the University of Strasbourg and the Situationist International in 1966
