= Council for Maintaining the Occupations =

Revolutionary committee formed during the May 1968 events in France

The Council for Maintaining the Occupations (French: Conseil pour le Maintien des Occupations), or CMDO, was a revolutionary committee formed during the May 1968 events in France originating in the Sorbonne. The council favored the continuation of wildcat general strikes and factory occupations across France, maintaining them through directly democratic workers' councils. Within the revolutionary movement, it opposed the influence of major trade unions and the French Communist Party who intended to contain the revolt and compromise with General Charles de Gaulle.

The council implemented a policy of equal representation for its participants. It was described by Situationist René Viénet as "essentially an uninterrupted general assembly, deliberating day and night. No faction or private meetings ever existed outside the common debate." It was formed on the evening of May 17, by supporters of the Sorbonne Occupation Committee.

== See also ==
- Sorbonne Occupation Committee
- On the Poverty of Student Life
- May 1968 in France
- Situationist International
