= Charles Radcliffe =

English political activist (1941–2021)

Charles Radcliffe (7 December 1941 – 10 July 2021) was an English cultural critic, political activist and theorist known for his association with the Situationist movement.

== Life ==
A member of the direct-action wing of the peace movement of the early 1960s, he became a regular contributor to the anarchist press in Britain and in 1966 launched Heatwave, a radical magazine produced in London. It lasted for just two issues, but was cited in the Situationist tract On the Poverty of Student Life as an example of one of the "profoundly revolutionary tendencies in the critique of all aspects of the prevailing way of life." Its treatment of popular culture has since been hailed as path-breaking: the critic Jon Savage has said that one piece by Radcliffe "laid the foundation for the next 20 years of sub-cultural theory."

Heatwave was closely associated with Rebel Worker, a short-lived but influential magazine published in Chicago by Franklin Rosemont, Penelope Rosemont, and Bernard Marszalek, to which Radcliffe was a contributor. They were members of the Industrial Workers of the World with links to the Surrealist movement in France, the British libertarian socialist group Solidarity and the Situationist International.

Radcliffe became a member of the English section of the S.I. in December 1966, alongside Chris Gray, Donald Nicholson-Smith and T. J. Clark. He resigned in November 1967, and Gray, Nicholson-Smith and Clark were expelled shortly thereafter.

Between early 1970 and summer 1972 Radcliffe was involved with the magazine Friends, sharing a flat with its editor, Alan Marcuson.

Radcliffe is a descendant of Moll Davis.

== Heatwave ==
Heatwave
- Cover of Heatwave magazine #1
- Editor: Charles Radcliffe
- Categories: Political philosophy
- First issue: July 1966
- Final issue: September 1966
- Based in: London
- Language: English

Heatwave was a short-lived libertarian socialist journal launched by Radcliffe. Only two issues of the journal were produced, appearing in July and September 1966. The first issue positioned itself as an 'experimental, perhaps slightly crazed libertarian socialist journal', and included a statement of intent:

'HEATWAVE is not a rival to existing publications on the libertarian left, but an addition to the libertarian press and an extension of its ideology, both conscious and unconscious, into new fields. HEATWAVE wants to generate heat in every field. We believe the time is ripe for an explosion of revolutionary energy which would alter the face of the earth. HEATWAVE advocates the use of any and all means that may bring to a climax the crisis of capitalism and authoritarianism, and result in the total extinction of all forms of exploitation or authority.'

The journal's formation was inspired by, and aspired to be the British counterpart of a similar, Chicago based publication, The Rebel Worker, which was associated with the Industrial Workers of the World.

Heatwave was notable for publishing one of the first instances of analysis of British youth subcultures of the 1960s from radical left perspective.

In their November 1966 pamphlet On the Poverty of Student Life, the Situationist International wrote "One thinks here of the excellent journal Heatwave, which seems to be evolving toward an increasingly rigorous radicality." Radcliffe and Heatwave contributor Chris Gray would subsequently become members of the short-lived English Section of the Situationist International.

The first issue of Heatwave was republished in 1993 by Chronos Publications. The text of both issues was included in the anthology King Mob Echo: English Section of the Situationist International compiled by Tom Vague and published by Dark Star Press in the year 2000.

== See also ==
- Chicago Surrealist Group
