= Strike of ORTF technicians and journalists in May-June 1968 =

From May to June 1968, television technicians and journalists at channel ORTF struck. This strike would play an important role in May 68 in France.

== Background ==
The strike became as a reaction to government interference with editorial coverage of political topic on French television.

This resulted in a nationwide strike by employees of ORTF television. This affected French television as ORTF had a 65% share of the television audience at the time.

== Reception ==
The television strike was widely condemned by the mainstream media such as Le Monde.
