= Sorbonne Occupation Committee =

Former political student group in France

The Sorbonne Occupation Committee (French: Comité d'Occupation de la Sorbonne) was a politically radical student group that occupied the Sorbonne during the May 1968 events in France.

The Sorbonne student occupation began Monday, 13 May, after the police withdrew from the Latin Quarter.

On 16 May, upon hearing about the successful occupation of the Sud-Aviation factory at Nantes by the workers and students of that city, as well as the spread of the movement to several factories (Nouvelles Messageries de la Presse Parisienne in Paris, Renault in Cléon), the Sorbonne Occupation Committee sent out a communiqué calling for the immediate occupation of all the factories in France and the formation of workers' councils.

== See also ==
- May 1968 in France
- On the Poverty of Student Life
- Council for Maintaining the Occupations
- Situationist International
