= Carlota Jaramillo =

Ecuadorian pasillo singer

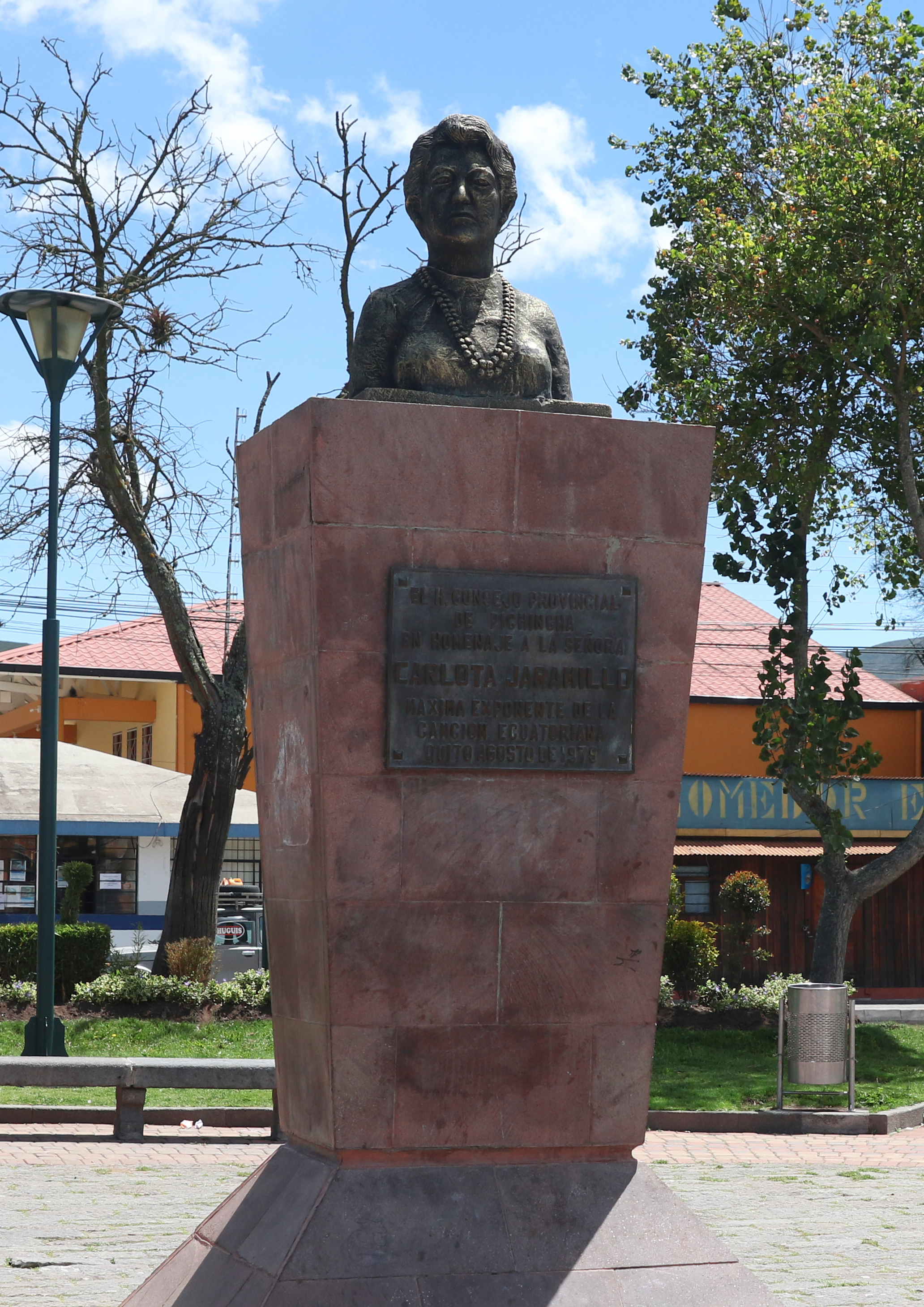

Background information
- Birth name: María Isabel Carlota Jaramillo
- Also known as: La Reina de la Canción Nacional
- Born: July 9, 1904; Calacalí, Ecuador
- Died: December 10, 1987 (aged 83); Quito, Ecuador
- Genres: Pasillo, Pasacalles
- Occupation: Singer
- Instrument(s): vocal, classical guitar
- Years active: 1922–1987

María Isabel Carlota Jaramillo, stage name Carlota Jaramillo (9 July 1904 – 10 December 1987), was an Ecuadorian pasillo singer, known as "La Reina de la Canción Nacional" (Queen of National Song).

== Early life ==
Jaramillo was born in Calacalí, in 1904. Her parents, Isaac Jaramillo Jaramillo and Natalia Jaramillo, were farmers. She grew in a musical family, one of her uncles and her maternal grandfather were musicians. Carlota studied in her hometown primary school and attended the “Manuela Cañizares” normal school in Quito to graduate as a teacher.

== Career ==
In 1922 Jaramillo and her sister won a song contest at the Teatro Sucre in Quito. They were the only women in the competition. After that Jaramillo pursued a musical career. She recorded her first record in 1938, the pasillo Amor Grande y Lejano. In 1942 she recorded with Luis Alberto Valencia, Sendas Distintas, composed by her husband, Jorge Araujo Chiriboga. Other hit songs by her include La ingratitud, Sombras, Honda pena, and Para mi tus recuerdos.

== Death and homages ==
Jaramillo died on 10 December 1987 of cerebral trauma after a fall in her home. She received a funeral with full honors from the Ecuadorian society. A monument in her honor was built in Calacalí in 1972. Her house was transformed into a museum in 2004.
