= Jorge Araújo Chiriboga =

Ecuadorian composer and actor

Jorge Humberto Araújo Chiriboga (1892-1970) was an Ecuadorian composer and actor, best known for his contributions to the pasillo genre. He was born in Riobamba, Chimborazo to Ángel Felipe Araújo, an army colonel. He studied at the Colegio San Felipe Neri in Riobamba and the Universidad Central de Quito. He worked as a librarian at the Biblioteca Municipal de Riobamba. Like his father, he served in the military and rose to the rank of lieutenant. He took early retirement to dedicate himself to the theatre and music.

He was known as the “galán joven” of the theatre companies (Dramática Nacional y Dramas y Variedades) that were founded in Quito during the 1930s. He married the famous actress and singer Carlota Jaramillo. With his brother Ángel Leónidas, Rubén Uquillas and other artists, he participated in the first radio shows broadcast by El Prado station of Riobamba. Although he composed relatively few songs, one of them ("Sendas distintas", dedicated to his wife) became a big hit. His music also features in the 1971 film To Die of Love.

He died in 1970 in Quito.
