= Beauty Is in the Street =

2011 book edited by Johan Kugelberg with Philippe Vermés

Beauty Is in the Street: A Visual Record of the May 68 Uprising
- Editors: Johan Kugelberg and Philippe Vermés
- Cover artist: Atelier Populaire
- Language: English
- Subject: Art of the May 1968 events in France
- Published: 2011 (Four Corners Books)
- Publication place: United Kingdom
- Media type: Print
- Pages: 272
- ISBN: 9780956192837

Beauty Is in the Street: A Visual Record of the May 68 Uprising is a 2011 book of posters produced by the Atelier Populaire (Popular Workshop) in support of the May 1968 events in France. It was edited by Johan Kugelberg with Philippe Vermés and published in the United Kingdom by Four Corners Books in 2011.

== Background ==
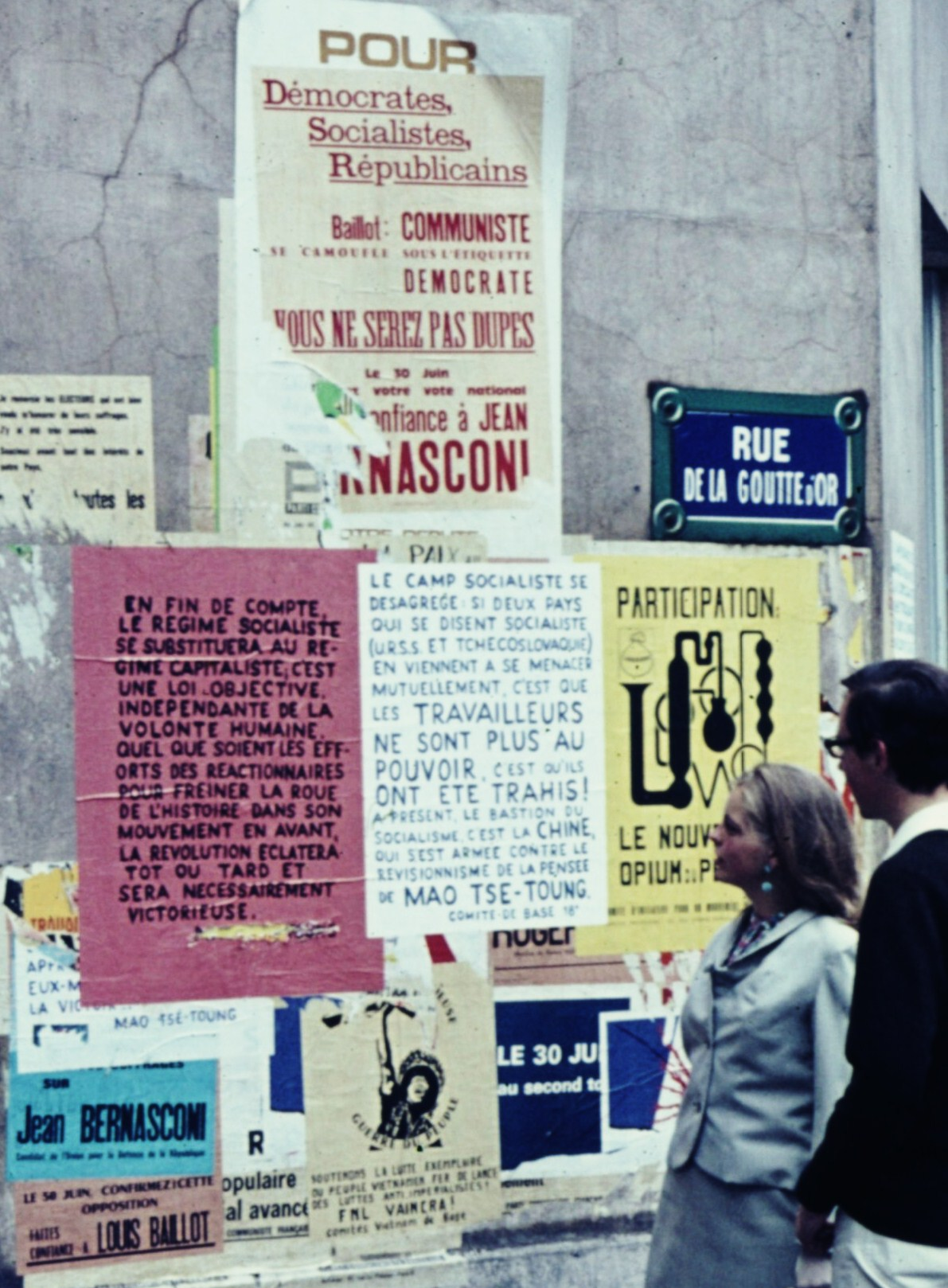
Posters in Paris in July 1968

The Atelier Populaire, who designed and printed the posters, were a group of Marxist artists and art students who occupied the École des Beaux-Arts during the wave of wildcat strikes in May 1968. Using a silk-screen printing press they produced thousands of posters at a time. They typically were printed on newssheet using a single colour, and use a simple iconography in which the factory represents the role of workers in society and the fist stands for solidarity and resistance (see right).

They comment on topics including the freedom of the press (see also Censorship in France), colonialism (see also French colonial empire) and the status of immigrant workers (see also Immigration to France). The posters were also used to voice opposition to consumerism and were inspired by the Situationist International's critique of the spectacle and Georges Perec's 1965 novel Things: A Story of the Sixties.

Though the posters display various styles, individual artists were never credited and each work was treated as the work of the collective. General assemblies were held to discuss and vote on the posters. In a 1969 book of the posters, the Atelier Populaire wrote "To use them for decorative purposes, to display them in bourgeois places of culture or to consider them as objects of aesthetic interest is to impair both their function and their effect."

Much of the imagery they created, including a poster of a truncheon-wielding riot policeman has since achieved iconic status. The posters were rarely saved but were collected by Kugelberg who staged an exhibition at London's Hayward Gallery in 2008. The exhibition commemorated the 40th anniversary of the protests.

== Overview ==
The book includes over 200 posters. As in the exhibition which preceded it, the posters in the book are accompanied by photographs taken by Vermés of the students, the production process and the protests, many of which were previously unpublished.

The book also includes a foreword by Vermés, a founder of the Atelier Populaire; translations of first-hand accounts of students' and strikers' clashes with the police; manifestos and pamphlets; a pictorial index, a bibliography, and a thumbnail gallery of posters that were not reproduced full-size.

== Critical reception ==
Writing in The Guardian, Justin McGuirk noted the continued relevance of "the spirit of '68" in the United Kingdom in the wake of the 2010 student protests, describing the book as "a beautiful volume". McGuirk questioned the absence of political design from the 2010 protests and occupations, as well as the commercial street art of Banksy and Shepard Fairey, and the contemporary popularity of the 1939 Keep Calm and Carry On poster.

The Los Angeles Times's Liesl Bradner also argued for the book's relevance in 2012 after the Occupy movement and Time's naming "the protester" as its Person of the Year in 2011. Alex Bec of the art blog It's Nice That noted that despite the events of May 1968 having been well documented, "Beauty is in the Street blew everything before it out of the water." Fíacha O'Dubhda of Eye described the book as one "that immerses the reader in the process through which spontaneous design and production were used to document, illustrate and instigate" the events of May 1968.
