= May 68 =

Period of civil unrest in France in 1968

May 1968 events in France
- Part of the Protests of 1968 and the Cold War
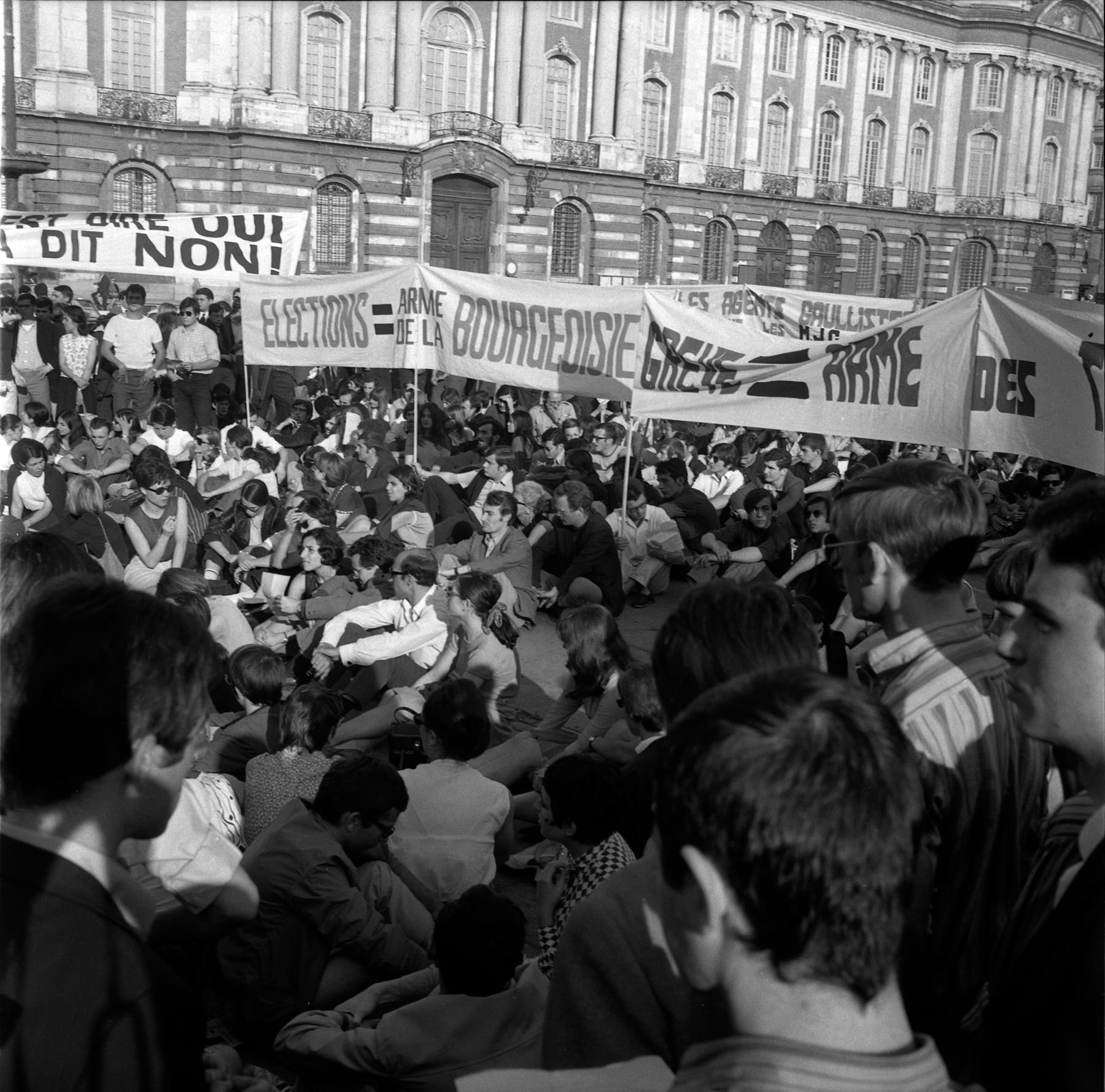
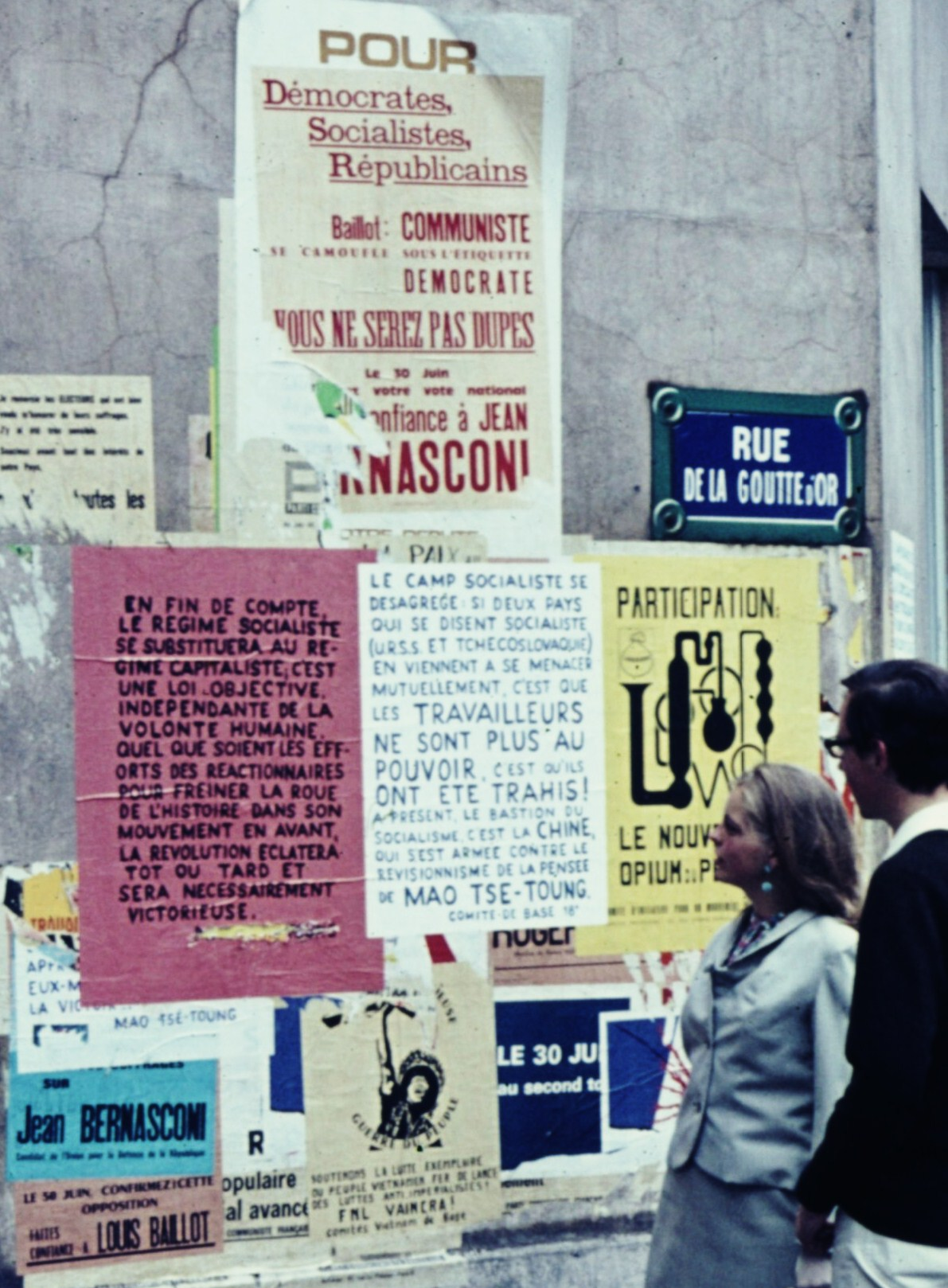
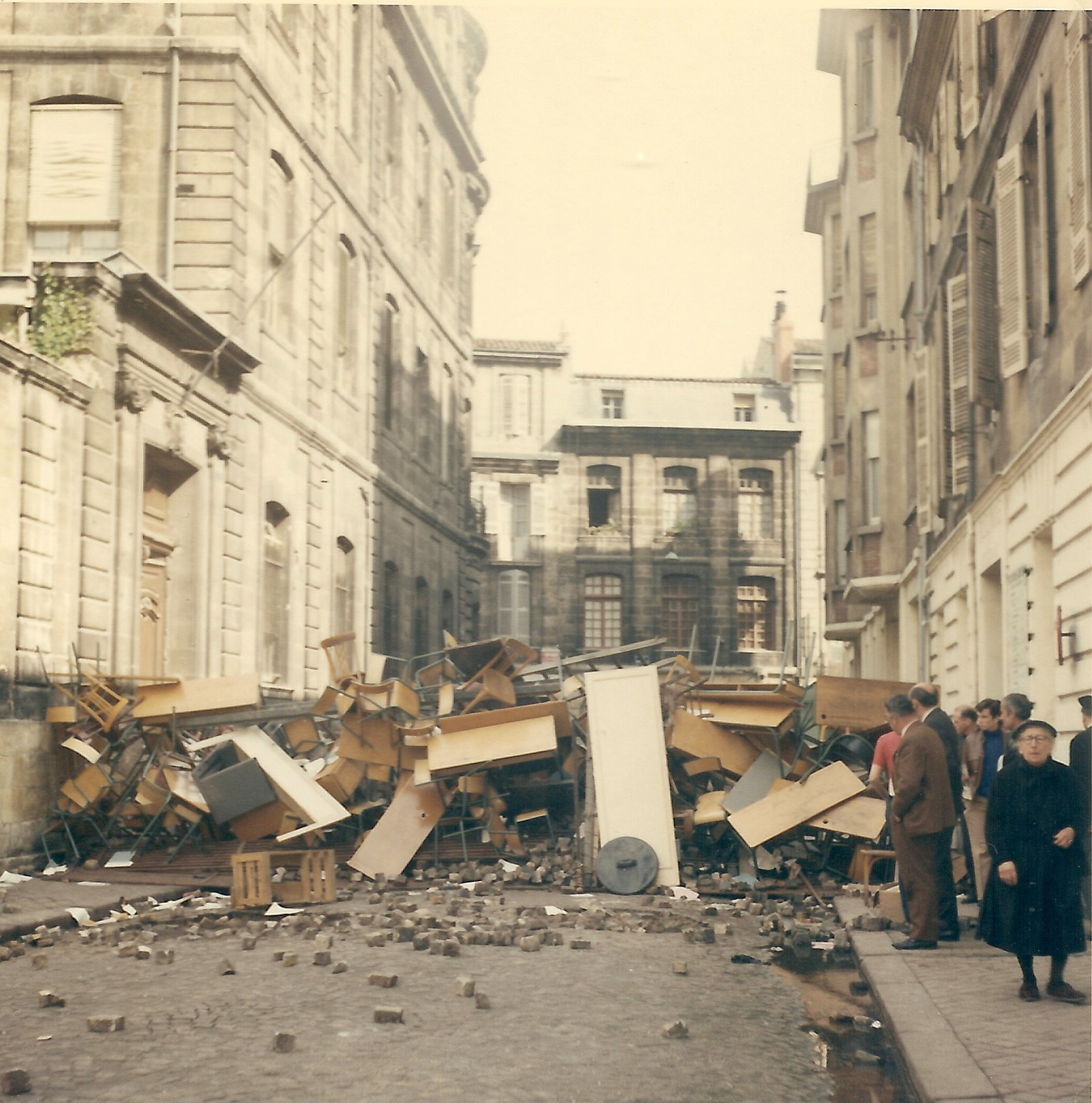
- Top: Protest in Toulouse, 12 June 1968; bottom left: posters in Paris; barricades in Bordeaux, May 1968
- Date: 2 May – 23 June 1968 (1 month and 3 weeks)
- Location: France
- Methods: Occupations, wildcat strikes, general strikes
- Result: Snap legislative election

Parties
Opposition: Anarchists; French Communist Party; Situationist International; Council for Maintaining the Occupations; Federation of the Democratic and Socialist Left; Students: Union Nationale des Étudiants de France; Sorbonne Occupation Committee; Unions: CGT; FO	(France) French Government; Ministry of the Interior; Police nationale; Compagnies Républicaines de Sécurité; French Armed Forces; Union of Democrats for the Republic; Counter-protestors: Occident

Lead figures
Non-centralized leadership Some notable people participating: François Mitterrand; Pierre Mendès France; Daniel Cohn-Bendit	Charles de Gaulle (President of France); Georges Pompidou (Prime Minister of France)

Casualties
- Deaths: 2 (only 25 May)
- Injuries: 887+ (only 25 May)
- Arrested: 1,000+ (only 25 May)

May 68 (French: Mai 68) was a period of protests, riots, strikes, and civil unrest in France, that began in May 1968, and became one of the most significant social uprisings in modern European history. Sparked by student demonstrations against university conditions and government repression, the movement escalated into a nationwide general strike involving millions of workers, bringing the country to the brink of revolution. The events have profoundly shaped French politics, labor relations, and cultural life, leaving a legacy of radical thought and activism.

After World War II, France underwent rapid modernization, economic growth, and urbanization, leading to increased social tensions. The period between 1945-75 is known as the Trente Glorieuses, the "Thirty Glorious Years", but it was also a time of exacerbated inequalities and alienation, particularly among students and young workers. By the late 1960s, France's university system was struggling to accommodate a growing student population, and the rigid structure of academia frustrated students amid a broader discontent with conservative social norms. Inspired by countercultural, anti-imperialist, Marxist, and anarchist ideologies, students increasingly viewed themselves as part of a revolutionary struggle against capitalism and authoritarianism. The French working class was dissatisfied with stagnant wages and poor working conditions, despite growth. The political order, dominated by President Charles de Gaulle's Fifth Republic, was seen by many as outdated and repressive.

The movement began with student demonstrations in March at Paris Nanterre University. After the police intervened to suppress activism, Nanterre was shut down on 2 May, and protests moved to the Sorbonne in central Paris. On 6 May, police violently dispersed a student gathering at the Sorbonne, leading to clashes with protesters and mass arrests. As the confrontations escalated, students erected barricades, and the night of 10 May saw street battles between protesters and police. Public outrage fueled further mobilization, and by 13 May, the protests had evolved into a general strike. About 10 million workers, two-thirds of the labor force, walked out in the largest general strike in French history, shutting down factories, transportation, and public services. Radical leftist groups gained influence, and calls for revolution grew. De Gaulle's government struggled to regain control, and on 29 May he briefly left for a French military base in West Germany. He returned the next day, dissolved the National Assembly, and called for new elections. By this point, the movement had lost momentum. The government, business leaders, and union representatives had negotiated the Grenelle agreements on 27 May, securing wage increases and concessions. As de Gaulle reasserted authority, the revolutionary moment faded.

In the elections on 23 June, de Gaulle's party won a resounding victory and the left-wing parties lost over half their seats, signaling the collapse of the immediate movement. Though it failed to bring about a revolution, May 68 had long-term consequences. The events weakened de Gaulle's authority: he resigned the following year. The movement led to increased state investment in education and social policies, though radical leftist politics declined in electoral influence. The strikes forced major concessions in labor rights, including wage increases, better working conditions, and expanded social protections.

The May 68 movement contributed to the growth of feminist, environmentalist, and LGBTQ activism, and inspired radical thought in philosophy, media, and academia, influencing figures like Michel Foucault and Jean Baudrillard. The movement's slogans and imagery remain touchstones of political and social discourse.

== Background ==
=== Political climate ===
In February 1968, the French Communist Party and the French Section of the Workers' International formed an electoral alliance. Communists had long supported Socialist candidates in elections, but in the "February Declaration" the two parties agreed to attempt to form a joint government to replace President Charles de Gaulle and his Gaullist Party.

=== University demonstration ===
On 22 March, far-left groups, a small number of prominent poets and musicians, and 150 students occupied an administration building at Paris University at Nanterre and held a meeting in the university council room about class discrimination in French society and the political bureaucracy that controlled the university's funding. The university's administration called the police, who surrounded the university. After the publication of their wishes, the students left the building without any trouble. After this, some leaders of what was named the "Movement of 22 March" were called together by the disciplinary committee of the university.

== Events of May ==
=== Student protests ===
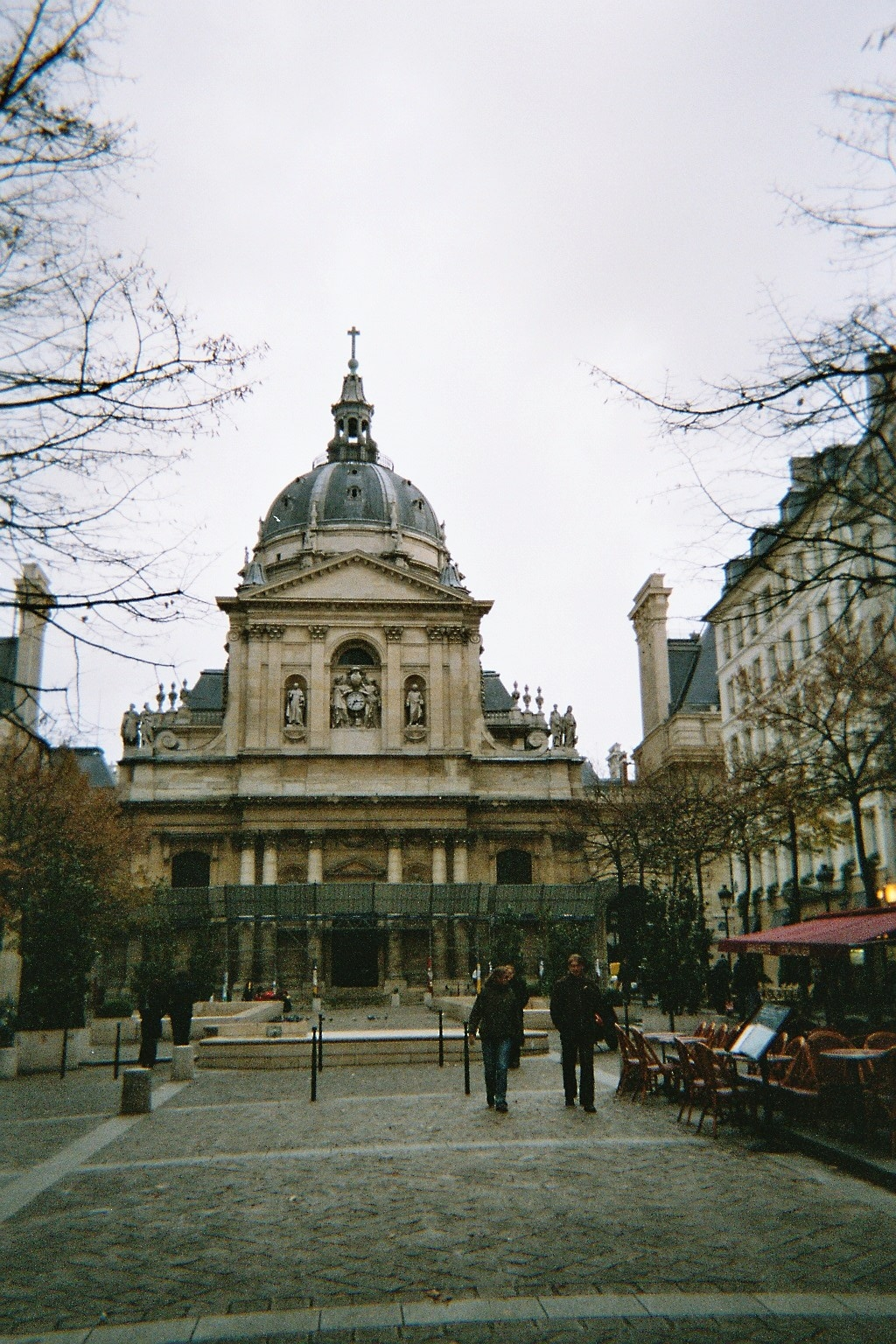
Public square of the Sorbonne, in the Latin Quarter of Paris

After months of conflicts between students and authorities at the Nanterre campus of the University of Paris (now Paris Nanterre University), the administration shut the university down on 2 May 1968. Students at the University of Paris's Sorbonne campus (today Sorbonne University) met on 3 May to protest the closure and the threatened expulsion of several Nanterre students. On 6 May, the national student union, the Union Nationale des Étudiants de France (UNEF, the National Union of Students of France)—still France's largest student union today—and the union of university teachers called a march to protest the police invasion of the Sorbonne. More than 20,000 students, teachers and supporters marched toward the Sorbonne, still sealed off by the police, who charged, wielding their batons, as soon as the marchers approached. While the crowd dispersed, some began to create barricades out of whatever was at hand, while others threw paving stones, forcing the police to retreat for a time. The police then responded with tear gas and charged the crowd again. Hundreds more students were arrested.

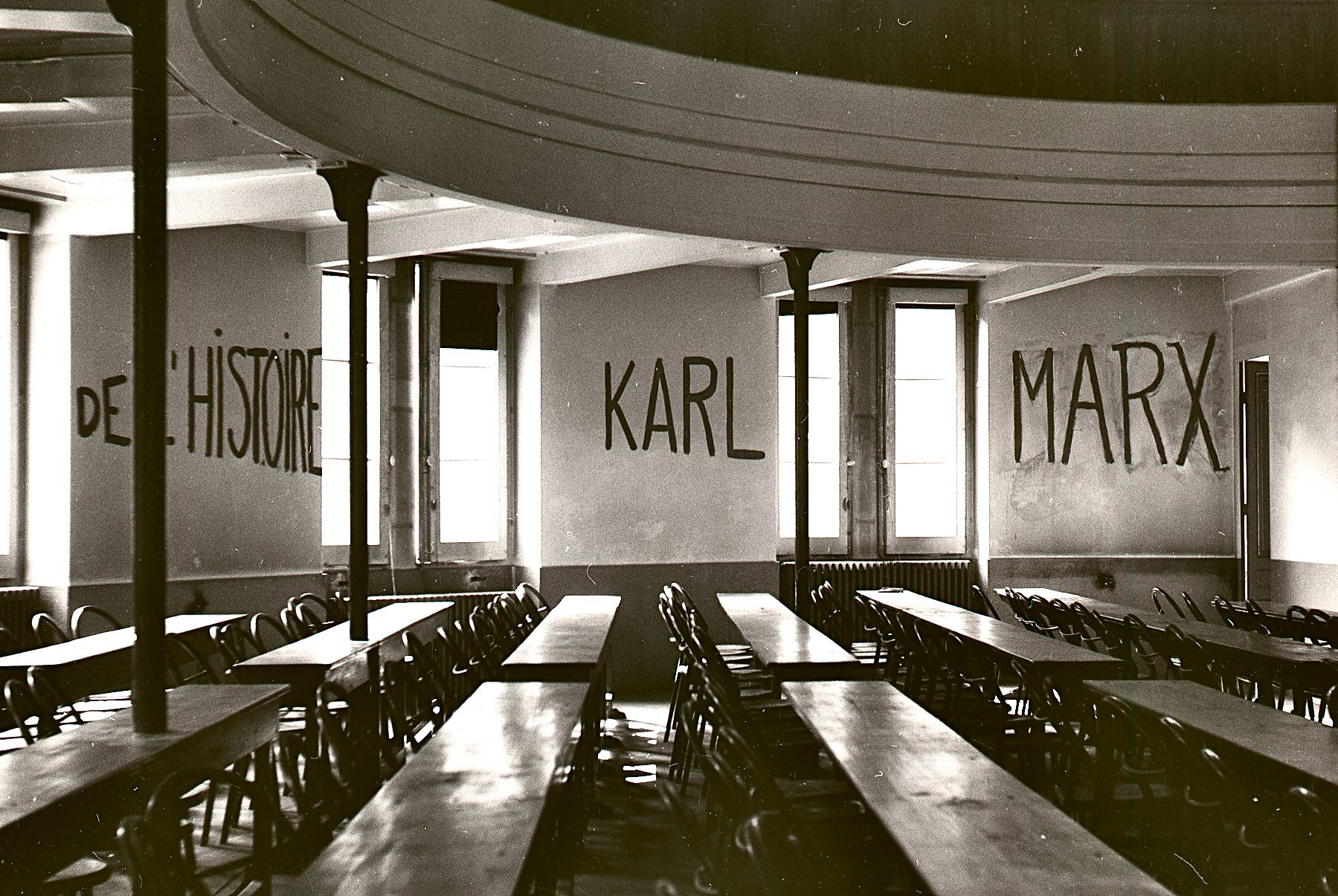
Graffiti in a classroom

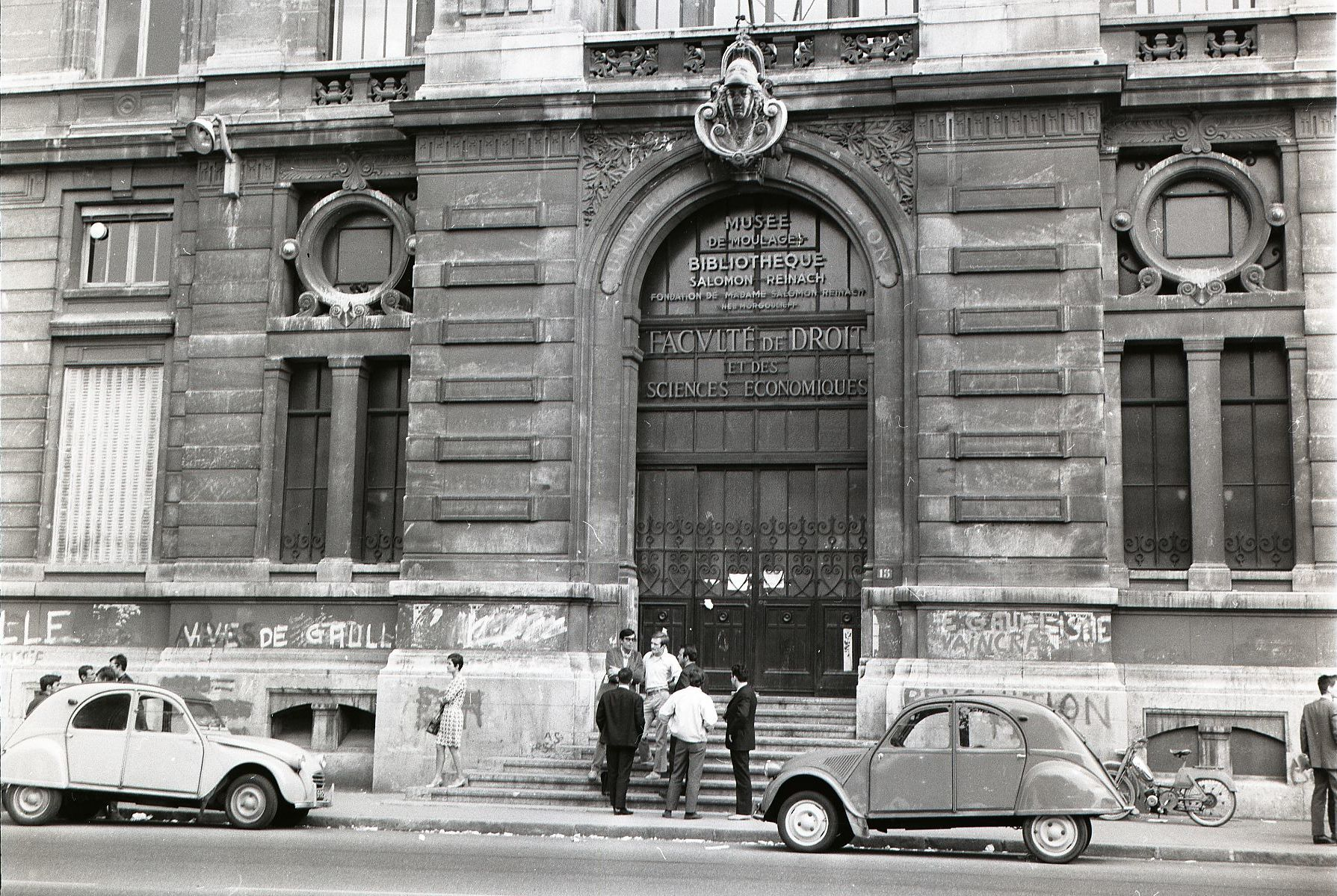
Graffiti on the school of law, "Vive de Gaulle" (Long live De Gaulle) with, at left, the word "A bas" (down with) written across "Vive"

University of Lyon during student occupation, May–June 1968

High school student unions spoke in support of the riots on 6 May. The next day, they joined the students, teachers and increasing numbers of young workers who gathered at the Arc de Triomphe to demand that (1) all criminal charges against arrested students be dropped, (2) the police leave the university, and (3) the authorities reopen Nanterre and Sorbonne.

=== Escalating conflict ===
Negotiations broke down, and students returned to their campuses after a false report that the government had agreed to reopen them, only to discover the police still occupying the schools. This led to near revolutionary fervor among the students.

On 10 May, another huge crowd congregated on the Rive Gauche. When the Compagnies Républicaines de Sécurité again blocked them from crossing the river, the crowd again threw up barricades, which the police then attacked at 2:15 am after negotiations once again floundered. The confrontation, which produced hundreds of arrests and injuries, lasted until dawn. The events were broadcast on radio as they occurred and the aftermath shown on television the next day. It was alleged that the police had participated in the riots, through agents provocateurs, by burning cars and throwing Molotov cocktails.

The government's heavy-handed reaction brought on a wave of sympathy for the strikers. Many of the nation's more mainstream singers and poets joined after the police brutality came to light. American artists also began voicing support of the strikers. The major left union federations, the Confédération Générale du Travail (CGT) and the Force Ouvrière (CGT-FO), called a one-day general strike and demonstration for Monday, 13 May.

Well over a million people marched through Paris that day; the police stayed largely out of sight. Prime Minister Georges Pompidou personally announced the release of the prisoners and the reopening of the Sorbonne. However, the surge of strikes did not recede. Instead, the protesters became even more active.

When the Sorbonne reopened, students occupied it and declared it an autonomous "people's university". Public opinion at first supported the students, but turned against them after their leaders, invited to appear on national television, "behaved like irresponsible utopianists who wanted to destroy the 'consumer society'". Nonetheless, in the weeks that followed, approximately 401 popular action committees were set up in Paris and elsewhere to take up grievances against the government and French society, including the Sorbonne Occupation Committee.

=== Worker strikes ===
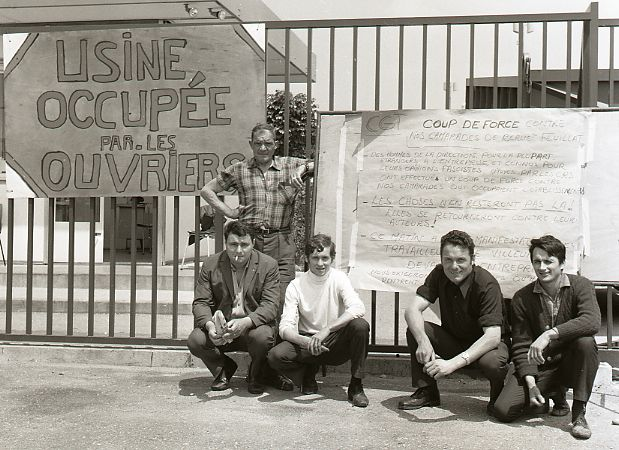
Strikers in Southern France with a sign reading "Factory Occupied by the Workers." Behind them is a list of demands, June 1968.

By the middle of May, demonstrations extended to factories, though workers' demands significantly varied from students'. A union-led general strike on 13 May included 200,000 in a march. The strikes spread to all sectors of the French economy, including state-owned jobs, manufacturing and service industries, management, and administration. Across France, students occupied university structures and up to one-third of the country's workforce was on strike.

On 24 May, two people died at the hands of rioters. In Lyon, Police Inspector Rene Lacroix died when he was crushed by a driverless truck rioters sent careering into police lines. In Paris, Phillipe Metherion, 26, was stabbed to death during an argument among demonstrators.

As the upheaval reached its apogee in late May, major trade unions met with employers' organizations and the French government to produce the Grenelle agreements, which would increase the minimum wage 35% and all salaries 10%, and granted employee protections and a shortened working day. The unions were forced to reject the agreement, based on opposition from their members, underscoring a disconnect in organizations that claimed to reflect working class interests.

The UNEF student union and CFDT trade union held a rally in the Charléty stadium with about 22,000 attendees. Its range of speakers reflected the divide between student and Communist factions. While the rally was held in the stadium partly for security, the speakers' insurrectionist messages were dissonant with the relative amenities of the sports venue.

=== Calls for new government ===
The Socialists saw an opportunity to act as a compromise between de Gaulle and the Communists. On 28 May, François Mitterrand of the Federation of the Democratic and Socialist Left declared that "there is no more state" and said he was ready to form a new government. He had received a surprisingly high 45% of the vote in the 1965 presidential election. On 29 May, Pierre Mendès France also said he was ready to form a new government; unlike Mitterrand, he was willing to include the Communists. Although the Socialists lacked the Communists' ability to form large street demonstrations, they had more than 20% of the country's support.

=== De Gaulle flees ===
On the morning of 29 May, de Gaulle postponed the meeting of the Council of Ministers scheduled for that day and secretly removed his personal papers from Élysée Palace. He told his son-in-law Alain de Boissieu: "I do not want to give them a chance to attack the Élysée. It would be regrettable if blood were shed in my personal defense. I have decided to leave: nobody attacks an empty palace." De Gaulle refused Pompidou's request that he dissolve the National Assembly, as he believed that their party, the Gaullists, would lose the resulting election. At 11:00 am, he told Pompidou, "I am the past; you are the future; I embrace you."

The government announced that de Gaulle was going to his country home in Colombey-les-Deux-Églises before returning the next day, and rumors spread that he would prepare his resignation speech there. However, the presidential helicopter did not arrive in Colombey, and de Gaulle had told no one in the government where he was going. For more than six hours the world did not know where he was. The canceling of the ministerial meeting and de Gaulle's mysterious disappearance stunned the French, including Pompidou, who shouted, "He has fled the country!"

=== Government collapse ===
With de Gaulle's closest advisors saying they did not know what he intended, Pompidou scheduled a tentative appearance on television at 8 pm The national government had effectively ceased to function. Édouard Balladur later wrote that as prime minister, Pompidou "by himself was the whole government", as most officials were "an incoherent group of confabulators" who believed that revolution would soon occur. A friend of Pompidou offered him a weapon, saying, "You will need it"; Pompidou advised him to go home. One official reportedly began burning documents, while another asked an aide how far they could flee by automobile should revolutionaries seize fuel supplies. Withdrawing money from banks became difficult, gasoline for private automobiles was unavailable, and some people tried to obtain private planes or fake national identity cards.

Pompidou unsuccessfully requested that military radar be used to follow de Gaulle's two helicopters, but soon learned that he had gone to the headquarters of the French Forces in Germany, in Baden-Baden, to meet General Jacques Massu. Massu persuaded the discouraged de Gaulle to return to France; now knowing that he had the military's support, de Gaulle rescheduled the meeting of the Council of Ministers for the next day, 30 May, and returned to Colombey by 6:00 pm. However, his wife Yvonne gave the family jewels to their son and daughter-in-law—who stayed in Baden for a few more days—for safekeeping, indicating that the de Gaulles still considered Germany a possible refuge. Massu kept as a state secret de Gaulle's loss of confidence until others disclosed it in 1982; until then most observers believed that his disappearance was intended to remind the French people of what they might lose. Although the disappearance was real and not intended as motivation, it indeed had such an effect on France.

=== Revolution prevented ===
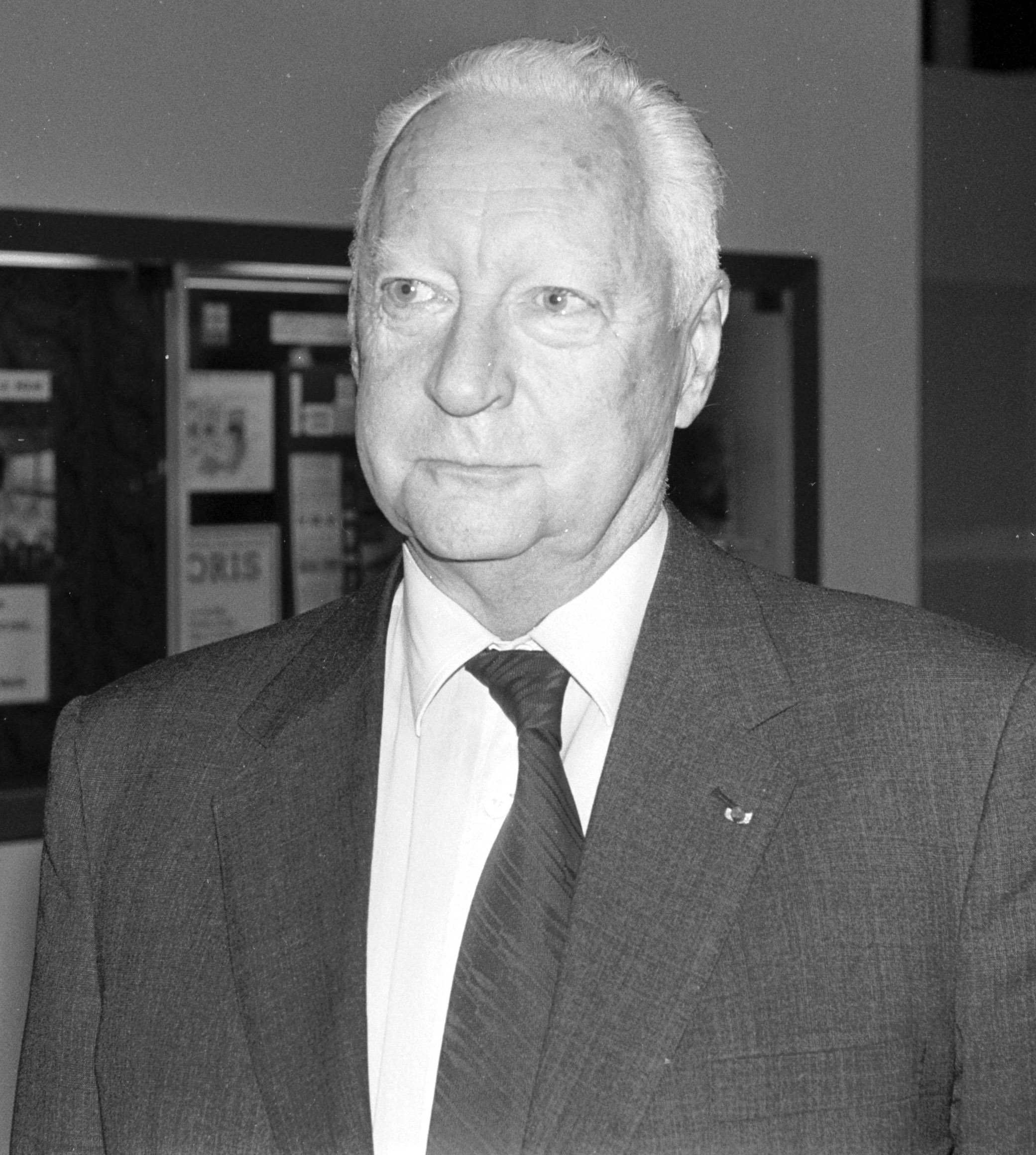
Pierre Messmer

On 30 May, 400,000 to 500,000 protesters (many more than the 50,000 the police were expecting) led by the CGT marched through Paris, chanting: "Adieu, de Gaulle!" ("Farewell, de Gaulle!"). Maurice Grimaud, head of the Paris police, played a key role in avoiding revolution by both speaking to and spying on the revolutionaries, and by avoiding the use of force. While Communist leaders later denied that they had planned an armed uprising, and extreme militants only comprised 2% of the populace, they had overestimated de Gaulle's strength, as shown by his escape to Germany. Historian Arthur P. Mendel, otherwise skeptical of French Communists' willingness to maintain democracy after forming a government, claims that the "moderate, nonviolent and essentially antirevolutionary" Communists opposed revolution because they sincerely believed that the party must come to power through legal elections, not armed conflict that might provoke harsh repression from political opponents.

Not knowing that the Communists did not intend to seize power, officials prepared to position police forces at the Élysée with orders to shoot if necessary. That it did not also guard Paris City Hall despite reports that it was the Communists' target was evidence of governmental chaos. The Communist movement largely centered around the Paris metropolitan area, and not elsewhere. Had the rebellion occupied key public buildings in Paris, the government would have had to use force to retake them. The resulting casualties could have incited a revolution, with the military moving from the provinces to retake Paris as in 1871. Minister of Defence Pierre Messmer and Chief of the Defence Staff Michel Fourquet prepared for such an action, and Pompidou had ordered tanks to Issy-les-Moulineaux. While the military was free of revolutionary sentiment, using an army mostly of conscripts the same age as the revolutionaries would have been very dangerous for the government. A survey conducted immediately after the crisis found that 20% of Frenchmen said they would have supported a revolution, 23% would have opposed it, and 57% would have avoided physical participation in the conflict. If there had been a military intervention, 33% said they would have fought against it, while only 5% would have supported it, and a majority of the country would have avoided any action.

=== Election called ===
At 2:30 pm on 30 May, Pompidou persuaded de Gaulle to dissolve the National Assembly and call a new election by threatening to resign. At 4:30 pm, de Gaulle broadcast his refusal to resign. He announced an election, scheduled for 23 June, and ordered workers to return to work, threatening to institute a state of emergency if they did not. The government had leaked to the media that the army was outside Paris. Immediately after the speech, about 800,000 supporters marched through the Champs-Élysées waving the national flag; the Gaullists had planned the rally for several days, which attracted a crowd of diverse ages, occupations, and politics. The Communists agreed to the election, and the threat of revolution was over.

== Aftermath ==
=== Protest suppression and elections ===
From that point, the revolutionary feeling of the students and workers faded away. Workers gradually returned to work or were ousted from their plants by police. The national student union called off street demonstrations. The government banned several leftist organizations. The police retook the Sorbonne on 16 June. Contrary to de Gaulle's fears, his party won the greatest victory in French parliamentary history in the legislative election held in June, taking 353 of 486 seats to the Communists' 34 and the Socialists' 57. The February Declaration and its promise to include Communists in government likely hurt the Socialists in the election. Their opponents cited the example of the Czechoslovak National Front government of 1945, which led to a Communist takeover of the country in 1948. Socialist voters were divided; in a February 1968 survey a majority had favored allying with the Communists, but 44% believed that Communists would attempt to seize power once in government (30% of Communist voters agreed).

On Bastille Day, there were resurgent street demonstrations in the Latin Quarter, led by socialist students, leftists and communists wearing red armbands and anarchists wearing black armbands. The Paris police and the Compagnies Républicaines de Sécurité (CRS) harshly responded starting around 10 pm and continuing through the night, on the streets, in police vans, at police stations, and in hospitals where many wounded were taken. There was, as a result, much bloodshed among students and tourists there for the evening's festivities. No charges were filed against police or demonstrators, but the governments of Britain and West Germany filed formal protests, including for the indecent assault of two English schoolgirls by police in a police station.

=== National feelings ===
Despite the size of de Gaulle's triumph, it was not a personal one. A post-crisis survey conducted by Mattei Dogan showed that a majority of the country saw de Gaulle as "'too sure of himself' (70%), 'too old to govern' (59%), 'too authoritarian' (64%), 'too concerned with his personal prestige' (69%), 'too conservative' (63%), and 'too anti-American' (69%)"; as the April 1969 referendum would show, the country was ready for "Gaullism without de Gaulle".

== Legacy ==
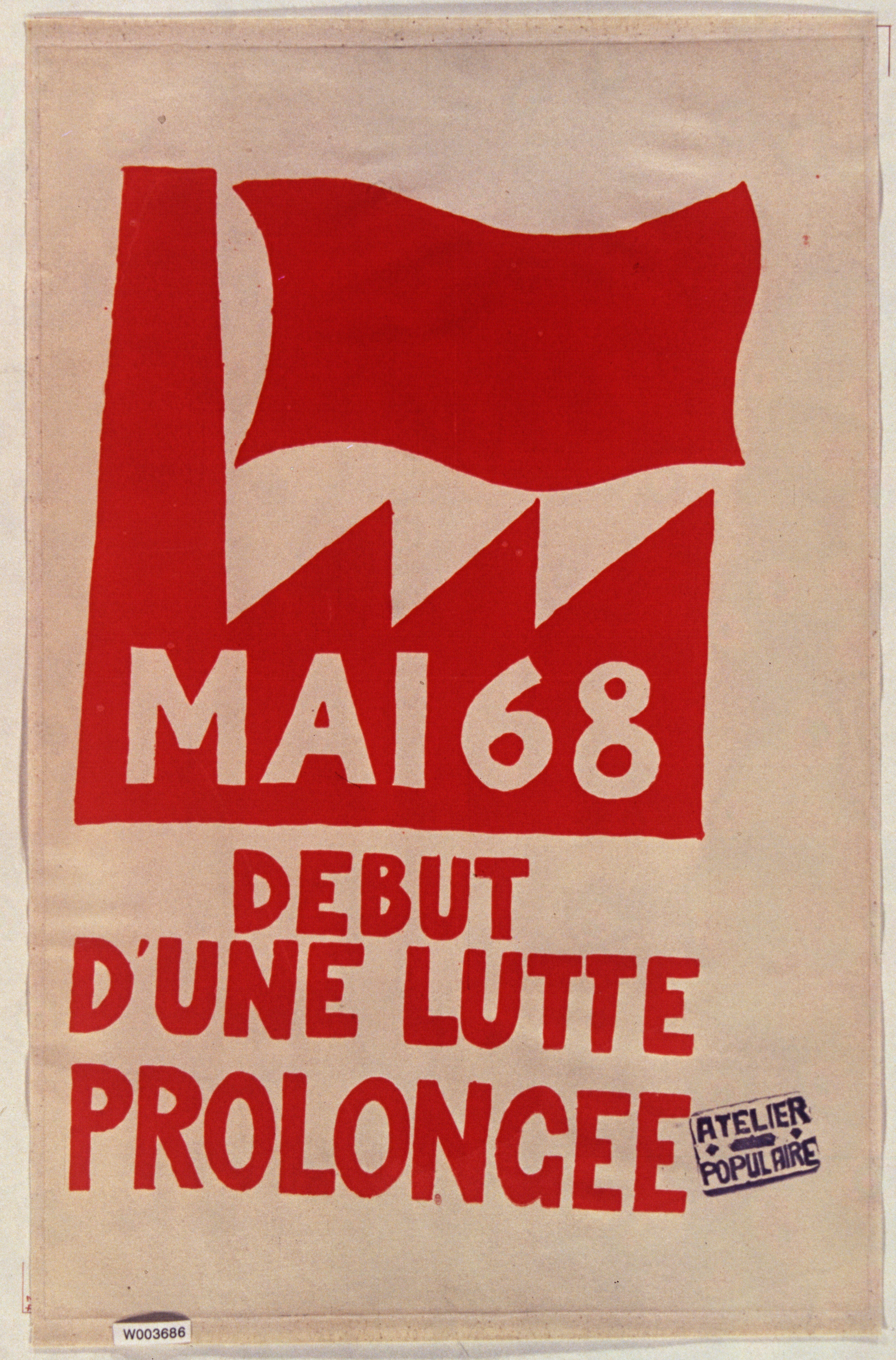
May 68 - Start of a prolonged struggle (Mai 68 - début d'une lutte prolongée) - poster by Atelier Populaire at the École des Beaux-Arts

May 1968 is an important reference point in French politics, representing for some the possibility of liberation and for others the dangers of anarchy. For some, May 1968 meant the end of traditional collective action and the beginning of a new era to be dominated mainly by the so-called new social movements.

Someone who took part in or supported this period of unrest is known as a soixante-huitard (a "68-er").

== Slogans and graffiti ==
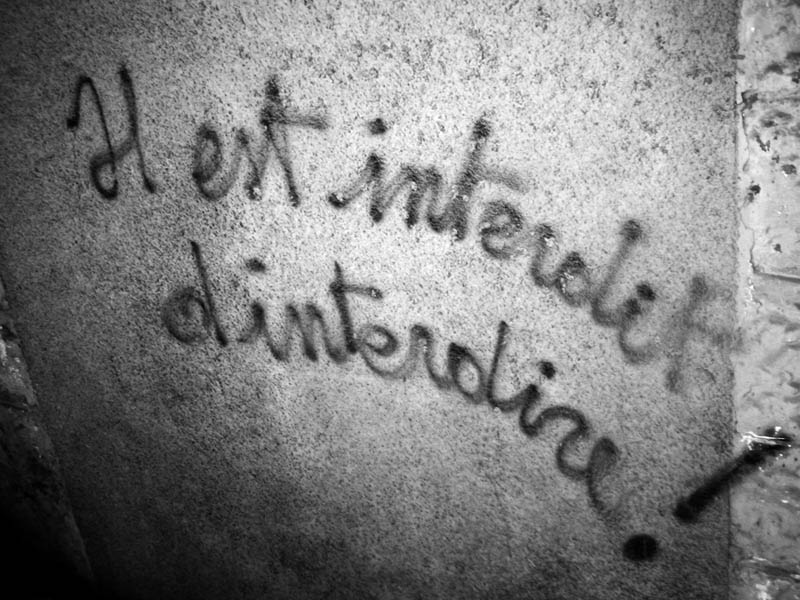
A slogan reading "It is forbidden to forbid,"

Sous les pavés, la plage! ("Under the paving stones, the beach!") is a slogan coined by student activist Bernard Cousin in collaboration with public relations expert Bernard Fritsch. The phrase became an emblem of the events and movement of the spring of 1968, when the revolutionary students began to build barricades in the streets of major cities by tearing up street pavement stone. As the first barricades were raised, the students recognized that the stone setts were placed atop sand. The slogan encapsulated the movement's views on urbanization and modern society both literally and metaphorically.

Other examples:

- Il est interdit d'interdire ("It is forbidden to forbid")
- L'imagination au pouvoir ("Power to the imagination")
- Jouissez sans entraves ("Enjoy without hindrance")
- Élections, piège à con ("Elections, a trap for idiots")
- CRS = SS
- Je suis Marxiste—tendance Groucho ("I'm a Marxist—of the Groucho persuasion")
- Marx, Mao, Marcuse! Also known as "3M".
- Cela nous concerne tous. ("This concerns all of us")
- Soyez réalistes, demandez l'impossible ("Be realistic, demand the impossible")
- "When the National Assembly becomes a bourgeois theater, all the bourgeois theaters should be turned into national assemblies." (Written above the entrance of the occupied Odéon Theater)
- "I love you!!! Oh, say it with paving stones!!!"
- "Read Reich and act accordingly!" (University of Frankfurt; similar Reichian slogans were scrawled on the walls of the Sorbonne, and in Berlin students threw copies of Reich's The Mass Psychology of Fascism at the police)
- Travailleurs la lutte continue[;] constituez-vous en comité de base. ("Workers[,] the fight continues; form a basic committee.") or simply La lutte continue ("The struggle continues")

== In popular culture ==
=== Cinema ===
- François Truffaut's film Baisers volés (1968) ("Stolen Kisses") takes place in Paris during the time of the riots and while not overtly political, makes passing reference to and depicts the demonstrations.
- André Cayatte's film Mourir d'aimer (1971) ("To Die of Love") is based on the story of Gabrielle Russier, a classics teacher (played by Annie Girardot) who committed suicide after being sentenced for having had an affair with one of her students during the events of May 68.
- Jean-Luc Godard's film Tout Va Bien (1972) examines the continuing class struggle within French society in the aftermath of May 68.
- Jean Eustache's film The Mother and the Whore (1973), winner of the Cannes Grand Prix, references the events of May 1968 and explores the aftermath of the social movement.
- Claude Chabrol's film Nada (1974) is based symbolically on the events of May 1968.
- Diane Kurys's film Cocktail Molotov (1980) tells the story of a group of French friends heading toward Israel when they hear of the May events and decide to return to Paris.
- Louis Malle's film May Fools (1990) satirically depicts the effect of the revolutionary fervor of May 1968 on small-town bourgeoisie.
- Bernardo Bertolucci's film The Dreamers (2003), based on Gilbert Adair's novel The Holy Innocents, tells the story of an American university student in Paris during the protests.
- Philippe Garrel's film Regular Lovers (2005) is about a group of young people participating in the Latin Quarter of Paris barricades and how they continue their life one year after.
- In the spy-spoof OSS 117: Lost in Rio, the lead character Hubert ironically chides hippie students, "It's 1968. There will be no revolution. Get a haircut."
- Olivier Assayas's film Something in the Air (2012) tells the story of a young painter and his friends who bring the revolution to their local school and have to deal with the legal and existential consequences.
- Le Redoutable (2017), a biopic of Godard, covers the 1968 riots/Cannes festival, etc.
- Roman Coppola's film CQ (2001), set in Paris in 1969, is about the making of a science-fiction film, Dragonfly, and shows the director discovering his starring actress during the 1968 demonstrations. During Dragonfly, set in the "future" Paris of 2001, the "1968 troubles" are explicitly mentioned.
- Wes Anderson's film The French Dispatch (2021) includes a segment, Revisions to a Manifesto, inspired by the protests.

=== Music ===
- Many of French anarchist singer-songwriter Léo Ferré's writings were inspired by those events. Songs directly related to May 1968 include "L'Été 68", "Comme une fille" (1969), "Paris je ne t'aime plus" (1970), "La Violence et l'Ennui" (1971), "Il n'y a plus rien" (1973), and "La Nostalgie" (1979).
- Claude Nougaro's song "Paris Mai" (1969).
- The imaginary Italian clerk described by Fabrizio De André in his album Storia di un impiegato is inspired to build a bomb set to explode in front of the Italian parliament by listening to reports of the May events in France, drawn by the perceived dullness and repetitiveness of his life compared to the revolutionary developments unfolding in France.
- The Refused song "Protest Song '68" is about the May 1968 protests.
- The Stone Roses's song "Bye Bye Badman", from their eponymous album, is about the riots. The album's cover includes the tricolore and lemons, which were used to nullify the effects of tear gas.
- The music video for David Holmes's song "I Heard Wonders" is based entirely on the May 1968 protests and alludes to the influence of the Situationist International on the movement.
- The Rolling Stones wrote the lyrics to the song "Street Fighting Man" (set to music of an unreleased song they had already written with different lyrics) in reference to the May 1968 protests from their perspective, living in a "sleepy London town". The melody was inspired by French police car sirens.
- Vangelis released an album, Fais que ton rêve soit plus long que la nuit ("May you make your dreams longer than the night"), about the Paris student riots in 1968. It contains sounds from the demonstrations, songs, and a news report.
- Ismael Serrano's song "Papá cuéntame otra vez" ("Papa, tell me again") references the May 1968 events: "Papa, tell me once again that beautiful story, of gendarmes and fascists and long-haired students; and sweet urban war in flared trousers, and songs of the Rolling Stones and girls in miniskirts."
- The title of Brazilian singer Caetano Veloso's "É Proibido Proibir" is a Portuguese translation of the slogan "It is forbidden to forbid". It is a protest song against the military regime that assumed power in Brazil in April 1964.
- Many of the slogans from the May 1968 riots were included in Luciano Berio's seminal work Sinfonia.
- The band Orchid references the events of May 68 as well as Debord in their song "Victory Is Ours".
- The 1975's song "Love It If We Made It" makes reference to the Atelier Populaire's book supporting the events, Beauty Is in the Street.

=== Literature ===
- James Jones's 1971 novel The Merry Month of May tells a story of (fictional) American expatriates caught up in Paris during the events.
- Gilbert Adair's 1988 novel The Holy Innocents has a climactic finale on the streets of 1968 Paris. It was adapted for the screen as The Dreamers (2003).

=== Art ===
- Spanish painter Joan Miró's painting May 1968 was inspired by the events in May 1968 in France.
- Liberté ? Égalité ? Fraternité ? is a triptych about May 68 events by Peruvian painter Herman Braun-Vega.

=== Video games ===
- The May 1968 protests were alluded to in a briefing tape for the character Cecile Cosima Caminades in Metal Gear Solid: Peace Walker, and was cited by her to be a major influence on her as well as her fellow Parisian women in terms of overall outlook.

== See also ==
- 1962 Rangoon University protests
- 1968 Columbia University protests
- 1968 Polish political crisis
- 1968 May-June strike of ORTF technicians and journalists
- 1968–1969 Japanese university protests
- Mexican Movement of 1968
  - Tlatelolco massacre
- 1973 Thai popular uprising, Thailand
- 6 October 1976 massacre, Thailand
- 1989 Tiananmen Square protests and massacre
- 1992 Black May, Thailand
- 2005 civil unrest in France
- 2006 Thai coup d'état
- 2006 youth protests in France
- 2011 anti-austerity movement in Spain (Movimiento 15-M).
- 2020 Thai protests
- 2020–21 Belarusian protests
- 8888 Uprising
- Autonomism
- Enragés
- Euromaidan
- First Quarter Storm
- On the Poverty of Student Life
- Report on the Construction of Situations
- Quiet Revolution
- Saffron Revolution
- Socialisme ou Barbarie
- Sunflower Student Movement, Taiwan
- Taksim Gezi Park protests
- U Thant funeral crisis
- Yellow Vests Movement

== Bibliography ==
- Damamme, Dominique; Gobille, Boris; Matonti, Frédérique; Pudal, Bernard, eds. (2008). Mai-juin 68 (in French). Éditions de l'Atelier. ISBN 978-2708239760.
