= To Die of Love =

- Mourir d'aimer Morire d'amore
- Directed by: André Cayatte
- Screenplay by: André Cayatte; Albert Naud; Pierre Dumayet
- Starring: Annie Girardot; Bruno Pradal; Claude Cerval; François Simon
- Cinematography: Maurice Fellous
- Music by: Louiguy
- Production companies: Cobra; Franco London Films
- Release dates: January 20, 1971 (France); May 27, 1971 (Italy)
- Running time: 114 mins
- Countries: France, Italy
- Language: French

To Die of Love (French: Mourir d'aimer; Italian: Morire d'amore) is a 1971 Franco-Italian film drama directed by André Cayatte. Based on the true story of Gabrielle Russier, it was the third most popular film of 1971 in France.

== Plot ==
The time is May 1968. Danièle Guénot, 32 years old and divorced with two children, is a politically engaged French and Latin teacher in Rouen who organises discussion sessions at her home. A 17-year-old student, Gérard Leguen, falls in love with her. She rebuffs him but eventually gives in to the mutual attraction. His parents complain, and she is sent to prison and he to other schools, relatives, and a psychiatric in-patient clinic. She eventually kills herself.

== Cast ==
- Annie Girardot: Danièle Guénot
- Bruno Pradal: Gérard Leguen
- Claude Cerval: judge
- François Simon: Gérard's father
- Jean-Paul Moulinot: Danièle's father
- Jean Bouise: juvenile justice judge
- Marie-Hélène Breillat [fr]: "The snake" (Danièle's cell mate in prison)
- Monique Mélinand: Gérard's mother
- Yves Barsacq: friend
- Edith Loria: Renée
- Jacques Marin: correspondent
- Raymond Meunier: Danièle's lawyer
- Maurice Nasil [fr]: teacher
- Marcelle Ranson[fr]: neighbour
- André Reybaz: school director
- Mariannik Revillon: Cécile
- Daniel Bellus: Jean-Luc
- Nicolas Dumayet [fr]: Marc
- Bernard Jeantet: Alain
- Nathalie Nell [fr]: Thérèse
- Franck Combeau: child 1
- Frantz Guéroult: child 2
- Claudine Berg [fr]: Mrs. Arnaud
- Florence Blot [fr]: lawyer
- Hélène Dieudonné|fr: blind old woman
- Marius Laurey [fr]: Mr. Arnaud
- Jean Marconi: clinic director
- Charles Millot: false judge
- Bernard Musson: head of student discipline
- Marcel Pérès (actor) [fr]: grandfather
- Clément Thierry : Danièle's ex-husband
- Roger Trapp [fr]: school monitor
- Marthe Villalonga: social worker
- Jacky Blanchot [fr]: inspector (uncredited)
- Marcel Gassouk [fr] prison employee (uncredited)
- Jean Minisini [fr]: nurse (uncredited)
- Yves Gavard-Perret: pupil who helps Gérard (uncredited)

== Background and production ==
The film is based on the story of Gabrielle Russier, a 32-year-old divorced French teacher in Marseille who killed herself on 1 September 1969 after being found guilty of corruption of a minor. It was largely shot at Mont-Saint-Aignan and Rouen, with some scenes being filmed at Cluses.

== Music ==
The score is by Louiguy. The song "Mourir d'aimer" by Charles Aznavour was also inspired by Russier's story and appeared before the film, at the beginning of 1971, but Louiguy did not allow it to be used in the French soundtrack; it was included in some non-French releases, including the Italian and the American. It was also represented as "inspired by the film" on 45 rpm singles that appeared soon afterwards. The version used on the Italian soundtrack won a Golden Lion at the 1971 Venice Film Festival.

The song "De terciopelo negro" (black fur) by the Ecuadorian Jorge Araujo Chiriboga recurs several times in the film, performed by Carmela, with Paco Ibañez on guitar. It and "Partida" (Parting) were issued as singles.

== Reception ==
The film was a success; 5,912,404 tickets were sold in France, making it the third most popular film of the year. Annie Girardot's performance as Danièle was particularly praised. The reviewer for The New York Times praised the performances and wrote that the film "delves deeply and often movingly into the states of mind of both the obdurate lawmakers and the tragic principals."

== Awards ==
- 1971: Grand Prix du cinéma français
- 1972: Nominee for Golden Globe Award for Best Foreign Language Film
