= Ron Hunt (disambiguation) =

Ron Hunt (1941–2026) was an American Major League Baseball player.

Ron Hunt may also refer to:

- Ron Hunt (footballer, born 1933) (1933–1999), English footballer (Colchester United)
- Ron Hunt (footballer, born 1945) (1945–2018), English footballer (QPR)
- Ron Hunt (American football) (born 1955), American football player
