= Suicide of Gabrielle Russier =

1968 suicide in France

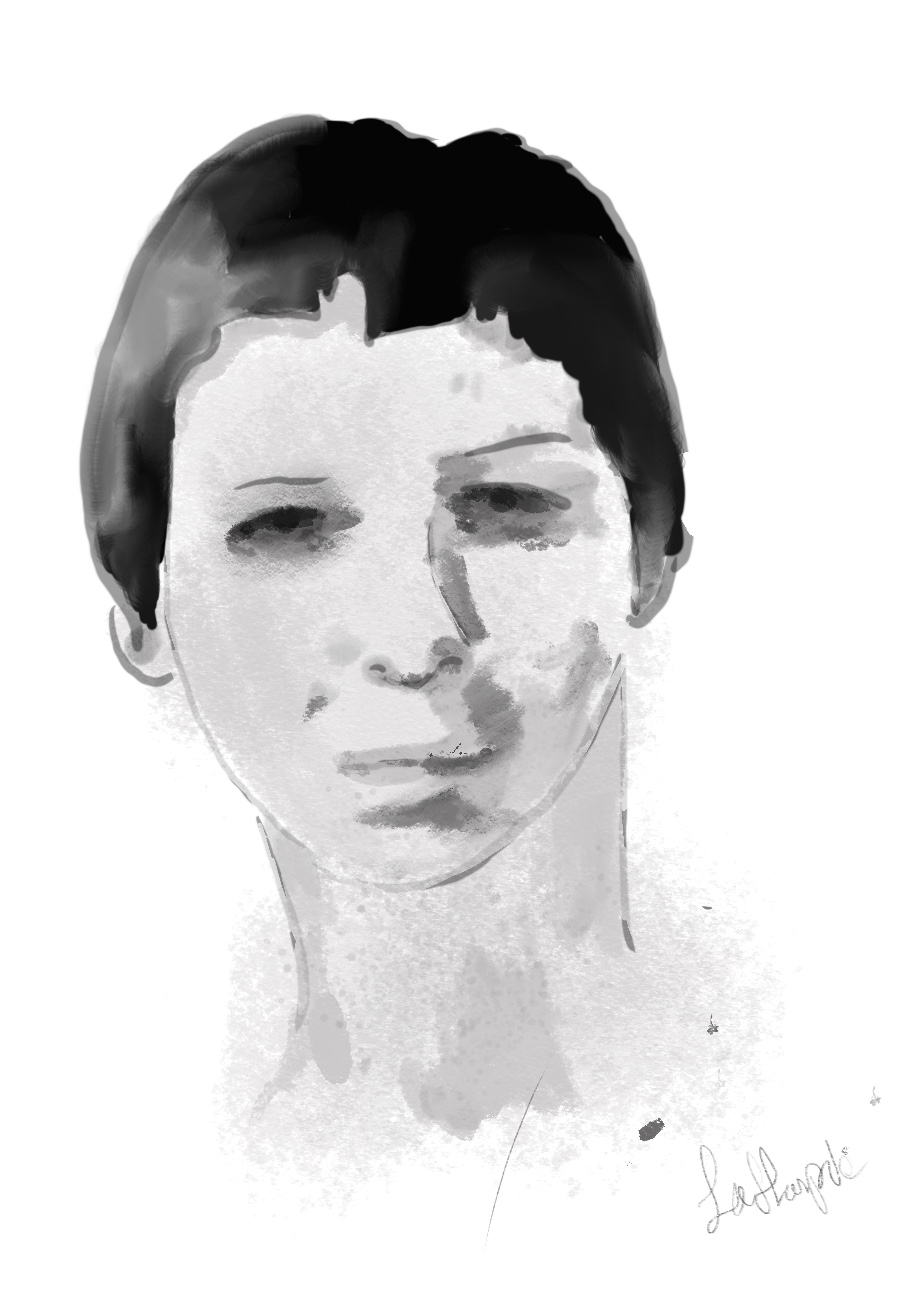
A portrait of Russier's face

Gabrielle Russier was a French literature teacher. She was prosecuted in 1968 for having an affair with her 16-year-old student Christian Rossi, which caused her to die by suicide on September 1 of the same year.

Her suicide inspired the 1971 French movie To Die of Love, directed by André Cayatte, and the book The Affair of Gabrielle Russier, also published in '71. At the time of her prosecution, Russier was a divorced mother of two children.

Grave of Gabrielle Russier in Père-Lachaise Cemetery
