= On the Poverty of Student Life =

1966 Situationist pamphlet

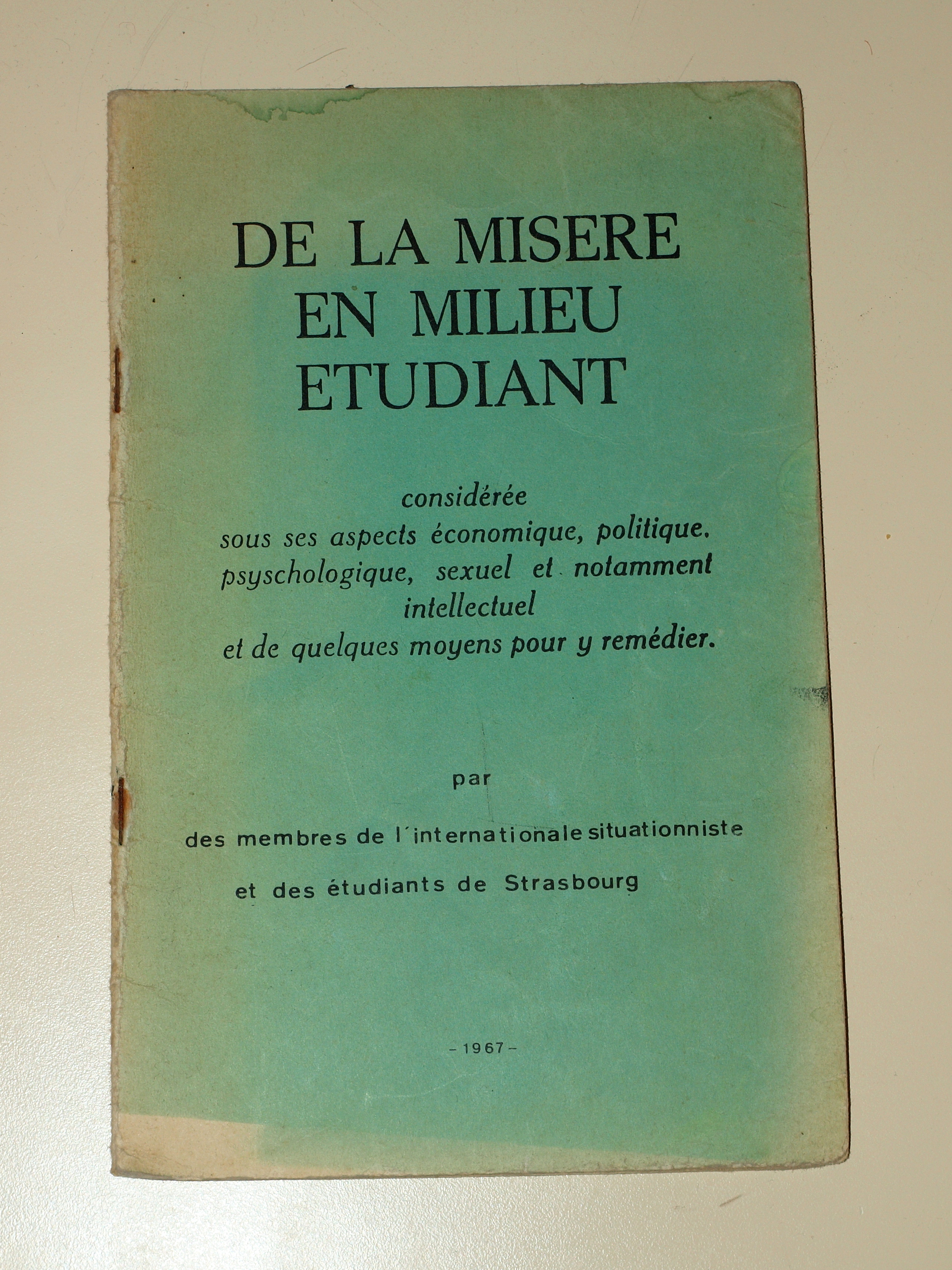
- Author: Mustapha Khayati
- Original title: De la misère en milieu étudiant
- Translator: Chris Gray; Ken Knabb
- Language: French
- Publication date: 1966
- Publication place: French Fifth Republic
- Media type: Pamphlet

On the Poverty of Student Life: A Consideration of Its Economic, Political, Sexual, Psychological and Notably Intellectual Aspects and of a Few Ways to Cure it (French: De la misère en milieu étudiant considérée sous ses aspects économique, politique, psychologique, sexuel et notamment intellectuel et de quelques moyens pour y remédier) is a pamphlet first published by students of the University of Strasbourg and the Situationist International (SI) in 1966. Attacking the subservience of university students and the strategies of student radicals, it caused significant uproar, led to the dissemination of Situationist ideas, and precipitated the events of May 1968 in France.

== Background and publication ==
Taking advantage of the apathy of their colleagues, five "Pro-situs", Situationist-influenced students had been elected to the University of Strasbourg's students' union in November 1966 and began scandalising the authorities. They formed an anarchist appreciation society, funded a flypost of André Bertrand's détourned comic strip, and invited the Situationists to critique their university, resulting in Mustapha Khayati's pamphlet, On the Poverty of Student Life.

The students promptly proceeded to print 10,000 copies of the pamphlet using university funds and distributed them during a ceremony marking the beginning of the academic year. This provoked an immediate outcry in the local, national and international media. The students responsible were expelled and the student union closed under court order. The scandal significantly raised the profile of the SI and led them to reappraise the revolutionary potential of academia, reversing their previous disillusionment to take seats on the Occupation Committee of the Sorbonne during May 1968. On the Poverty of Student Life was a key text for the French and German students who rebelled in 1968.

== Content and reception ==
The text displayed an advanced understanding of Situationist concepts and tactics. It provoked the students of the university by confronting them with their subservience to the ideological conditions imposed upon them by the state, family and the university system. The pamphlet alleged that the students fled from this reality to take refuge in miserabilism and bohemianism. It also criticised radical student collectives including the Provos (Netherlands), Committee of One Hundred (United Kingdom) and those of Berkeley, California (United States) for fighting specific issues such as nuclear arms, racism and censorship rather than the system at large, praising only the British anarchist direct-action group Spies for Peace.

The title of the pamphlet induced fury in the Parisian cafés in the Spring of 1967. The pamphlet was described by a local newspaper shortly after its release as "the first concrete manifestation of a revolt aiming quite openly at the destruction of society".

Critic Greil Marcus characterised the pamphlet as a polemic in his history of 20th century avant-garde art movements, Lipstick Traces (1990).

== See also ==
- Report on the Construction of Situations
- Port Huron Statement
- Karl Marx, The Poverty of Philosophy (1847)
