= Ken Knabb =

American translator and writer (born 1945)

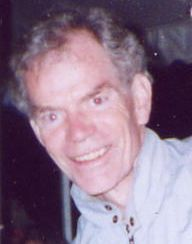
- Knabb in 2003
- Born: 1945 (age 80–81); Louisiana, United States
- Education: Shimer College
- Occupations: Writer and translator
- Movement: Situationist International
- Website: bopsecrets.org

Ken Knabb (born 1945) is an American writer, translator, and radical theorist, known for his translations of Guy Debord and the Situationist International. His own English-language writings, many of which have been anthologized in Public Secrets (1997) and The Joy of Revolution and Related Texts (2026), have been translated into over a dozen additional languages. He is also a respected authority on the political significance of Kenneth Rexroth.

== Early life ==
Knabb was born in Louisiana in 1945 and raised in Missouri. He attended Shimer College from 1961 to 1965, then moved to Berkeley, California, where he took part in the countercultural and radical adventures of the 1960s. In 1969, having become disillusioned with the increasingly authoritarian tendencies in the New Left movement, he became an anarchist. Later that same year, he discovered some pamphlets by the Situationist International and was so struck by them that he began experimenting with critiques and interventions in a style similar to that of the situationists. Over the next few years, he taught himself French in order to read the original situationist writings (most of which were then unavailable in English) and made several extended visits to France to meet various situationist groups and individuals, as well as shorter trips to meet contacts in other European countries and in Japan and Hong Kong.

== Works ==
In 1981, Knabb published the Situationist International Anthology, a large collection of articles drawn mostly from the French journal Internationale Situationniste. His other translations include Guy Debord's film scripts (Complete Cinematic Works), Debord's The Society of the Spectacle, and Ngo Van's In the Crossfire: Adventures of a Vietnamese Revolutionary. Knabb's own writings have been collected in Public Secrets: Collected Skirmishes of Ken Knabb (1997) and The Joy of Revolution and Related Texts (2026) and also posted on his Bureau of Public Secrets website. His shorter works include leaflets, comics, pamphlets, and articles on Wilhelm Reich, Georges Brassens, Gary Snyder, the 1960s hip counterculture, the 1970 Polish revolt, the 1979 Iranian revolution, the 1991 Gulf War, the 2006 anti-CPE revolt in France, the 2011 Occupy movement, the 2020 coronavirus shutdown, and the two Trump elections and the new forms of resistance they have inspired. His longer works include The Relevance of Rexroth (a study of the anarchist poet and essayist Kenneth Rexroth), Gateway to the Vast Realms (a reader's guide to 500 recommended books), Confessions of a Mild-Mannered Enemy of the State (autobiography), and The Joy of Revolution (an examination of the pros and cons of diverse radical tactics followed by some speculations on how a situationist-type nonstate and noncapitalist postrevolutionary society might function).

== Perspectives ==
Although Knabb has remained in substantial agreement with most of the situationist perspectives, some of his writings can be seen as attempts to meld, or at least to juxtapose, those perspectives with the rather different tone and scope of Kenneth Rexroth and with the experiential insights of Zen Buddhism (he is a long-time Zen practitioner). In a 1977 pamphlet, for example, he critiqued what he saw as the situationists' blindspot regarding religion. Conversely, he has also criticized the political naiveté of "socially engaged" Buddhists. Another of his recurring themes is the importance of paying attention to the psychological or "subjective" aspect of radical activities.

== Bibliography ==
- The Relevance of Rexroth (Bureau of Public Secrets, 1990)
- Public Secrets: Collected Skirmishes of Ken Knabb (Bureau of Public Secrets, 1997)
- The Joy of Revolution and Related Texts (PM Press, 2026)
- (trans.) Situationist International Anthology (Bureau of Public Secrets, 1981; revised and expanded edition, 2006; reprinted by PM Press, 2024)
- (trans.) Guy Debord's Complete Cinematic Works (AK Press, 2003; revised and expanded edition, PM Press, 2026)
- (trans.) Guy Debord's The Society of the Spectacle (Rebel Press, 2004; revised and annotated edition, Bureau of Public Secrets, 2014; reprinted by PM Press, 2024)
- (trans.) Ngo Van's In the Crossfire: Adventures of a Vietnamese Revolutionary (AK Press, 2010)
