= Chris Gray (situationist) =

English member of the Situationist International

Christopher Gray (22 May 1942 – 14 May 2009) was an activist in the Situationist International and follower of Bhagwan Shree Rajneesh.

Christopher Nelson Gray was born on 22 May 1942 in London; he was raised by his grandmother in Crosby, Merseyside, and educated at Repton School.

Gray worked with Conrad Rooks on the film Chappaqua in the mid-sixties.

He died at the age of 67 at the London Hampstead Marie Curie Hospice (Eden Hall) on May 14th 2009.

== Radical politics ==
In the mid-sixties, Gray met Charles Radcliffe at an anarchist meeting in London. The pair bonded over a shared interest in radical groups including Black Mask, Solidarity (UK) and the Situationist International. Gray then became a contributor to Radcliffe's magazine Heatwave.

In December 1966, Gray and Radcliffe became members of the short-lived English Section of the Situationist International, along with Donald Nicholson-Smith and T. J. Clark.

In 1967 Gray translated situationist Raoul Vaneigem's Banalités de Base (1962-63) which he published as the pamphlet The Totality for Kids.

Gray's expulsion from the Situationist International on the 21 December 1967 was announced in the 12th (and final) issue of the organisation's journal. The reasons cited were the English Section's refusal to disassociate themselves from Ben Morea and Black Mask. The expelled English situationists then formed London radical group King Mob with twin brothers David and Stuart Wise, who had recently arrived in London from Newcastle.

Gray continued to translate Situationist International texts, editing the first book length anthology of the group to appear in English - Leaving The Twentieth Century: The incomplete works of the Situationist International (Free Fall Publications, London 1974).

== Bhagwan Shree Rajneesh ==
According to Dick Pountain "By the late 1970s Gray was spending much time in India, as a trekking guide in the Himalayas and a not uncritical follower of Bhagwan Shree Rajneesh (known after 1989 as "Osho"). Under the pen-name "Sam", Chris published Life of Osho (1997)"

== The Acid Diaries ==
For three years Gray self-administered the psychedelic drug LSD, applying the theories of Stanislav Grof to analyse his own experiences. He also used the works of Aldous Huxley, Albert Hofmann and Gordon Wasson to develop an account of the possible value of LSD as a tool for transpersonal growth and spiritual development.

== Publications ==
- Leaving The Twentieth Century: The incomplete works of the Situationist International (1974) Free Fall Publications, London. Republished by Rebel Press (London) 1998.
- Life of Osho (1997) published under the pseudonym of "Sam" by Sannyas, London.
- The Acid, published under the pseudonym of "Sam" by Vision Press (2009). Republished as Christopher Gray - The Acid Diaries: A Psychonaut's Guide to the History and Use of LSD (2010) London: Park Street Press.
