= Ronald Hunt (art historian) =

English art historian

Ronald Hunt (born 1936, Bristol) is an English art historian. He worked in the National Art Library of the Victoria and Albert Museum before becoming a librarian at Newcastle University. He established his reputation writing on Picabia, Constructivism, Dadaism and Surrealism.

Richard Hamilton had taken over from Victor Pasmore in teaching the Foundation Art course at the University of Newcastle in 1961. On his initiative Hunt was invited to become librarian for the Department of Fine Art there. In 1966 and 1967, Hunt established a small collective based amongst the students there which published the journal Icteric.
