= The 4-Skins =

English Oi! band

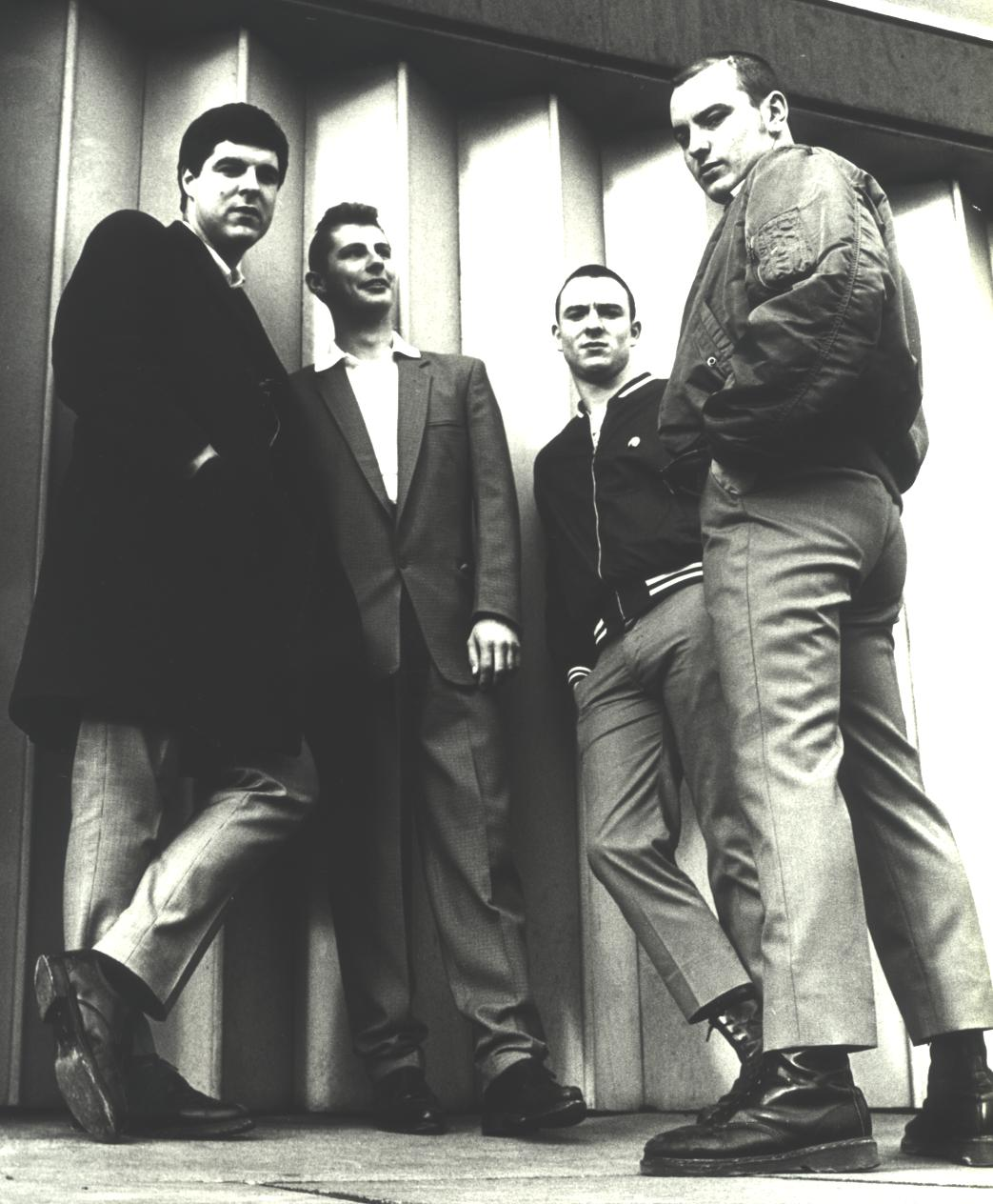
- The classic 4-Skins line-up: McCourt, Pear, Jacobs and Hodges, outside Tower Hill tube station, 1980

Background information
- Also known as: Gary Hodges' 4-Skins
- Origin: East End of London, England
- Genres: Punk rock, Oi!, ska
- Years active: 1979–1984; 2007–present
- Labels: Clockwork Fun; Secret Records; Syndicate Records; G&R London; Randale Records; Clockwork Firm
- Members: As Gary Hodges' 4-Skins; Gary Hodges; Graham Bacon; Tom Brennan; Sedge Swatton
- Past members: Hoxton Tom McCourt; Roi Pearce; Paul Swain; Ian Bramson; Steve 'Rockabilly' Pear; John Jacobs; Tony 'Panther' Cummins; Pete Abbot; Steve 'H' Hamer; Mick Geggus; Andy Russell

The 4-Skins are an English punk rock band from the East End of London. Originally composed of Gary Hodges (vocals), 'Hoxton' Tom McCourt (guitar), Steve 'H' Harmer (bass) and John Jacobs (drums), the group was formed in 1979 and disbanded in 1984 – although new line-ups formed in 2007 and 2008. Many of their songs dealt with violent topics, but the band has claimed they were discussing the realities of inner city life, not promoting violence. Other 4-Skins song topics include police harassment, political corruption, war and unemployment.

== Career ==
The band members first met each other through mutual interest in football or in bands such as Sham 69 and Menace. Most of the original four band members were or had been skinheads, thus the double meaning of the band's name. However, Steve Pear had a rockabilly style, and Hoxton Tom McCourt — who was a suedehead — was one of the leading participants of the mod revival. Prior to the release of the band's debut single, "One Law for Them", The 4-Skins contributed songs to the first three Oi! compilation albums, alongside bands such as Cockney Rejects, Cock Sparrer, The Business and Angelic Upstarts. The 4-Skins went through many personnel changes during their initial five-year existence, with only bassist/songwriter 'Hoxton' Tom McCourt being present in every band line-up. Other former members include Roi Pearce, who was also the frontman of The Last Resort, and Paul Swain, a guitarist who later joined white power rock band Skrewdriver.

In 2007, The 4-Skins reformed with two original members — lead singer Gary Hodges and bassist Steve 'H' Harmer, plus guitarist Mick Geggus and drummer Andy Russell of Cockney Rejects. This line-up recorded two songs, "Chaos 2007" and "Glory Days", for the compilation album Kings of Streetpunk, released by the independent record label G&R London.

In 2008, Hodges formed a new version of the band under the name Gary Hodges' 4-Skins. This line-up played three shows – one in Berlin at the Punk and Disorderly festival, in Allentown, Pennsylvania, at the East Coast Oi Fest and as the headlining act on the final day of the Blackpool Rebellion punk festival in August 2008. Two newly recorded tracks were also released for free on The 4-Skins' official web page. Both were covers of Slade songs – "Cum on Feel the Noize" and "Thanks for the Memories". Following this, the band decided to continue recording and touring. On 4 April 2010, they released a studio album, The Return, on German label Randale Records.

== Band members ==
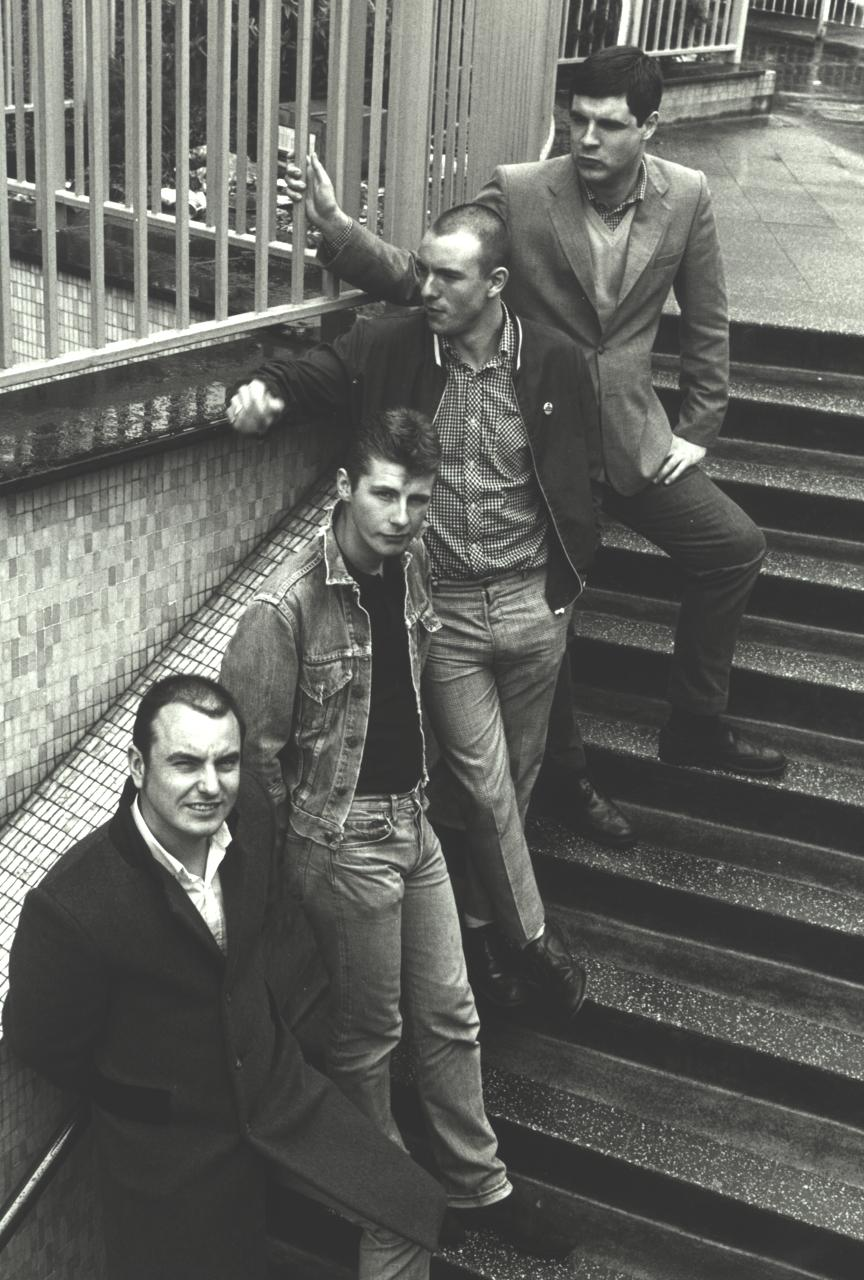
The 4-Skins' Hodges, Pear, Jacobs and McCourt at Aldgate East, East London, 1980

=== 1979–1980 ===
- Hoxton Tom McCourt (guitar)
- Gary Hodges (vocals)
- Steve 'H' Harmer (bass)
- Gary Hitchcock (drums).

=== 1980–1981 ===
- Hoxton Tom McCourt (bass)
- Gary Hodges (vocals)
- Steve 'Rockabilly' Pear (guitar)
- John Jacobs (drums)

=== 1981–1983 ===
- Hoxton Tom McCourt (bass)
- Tony 'Panther' Cummins (vocals)
- John Jacobs (guitar/keyboards)
- Pete Abbot (drums)

=== 1983–1984 ===
- Hoxton Tom McCourt (bass)
- Roi Pearce (vocals)
- Paul Swain (guitar)
- Ian Bramson (drums)

=== 2007 ===
- Gary Hodges (vocals)
- Steve 'H' Harmer (bass)
- Mick Geggus (guitar)
- Andy Russell (drums)
- Dave Propri
- Chris Caraway

=== 2008–present ===
- Gary Hodges (vocals)
- Bakes (bass)
- Big Tom (guitar)
- Sedge (drums)

== Partial discography ==
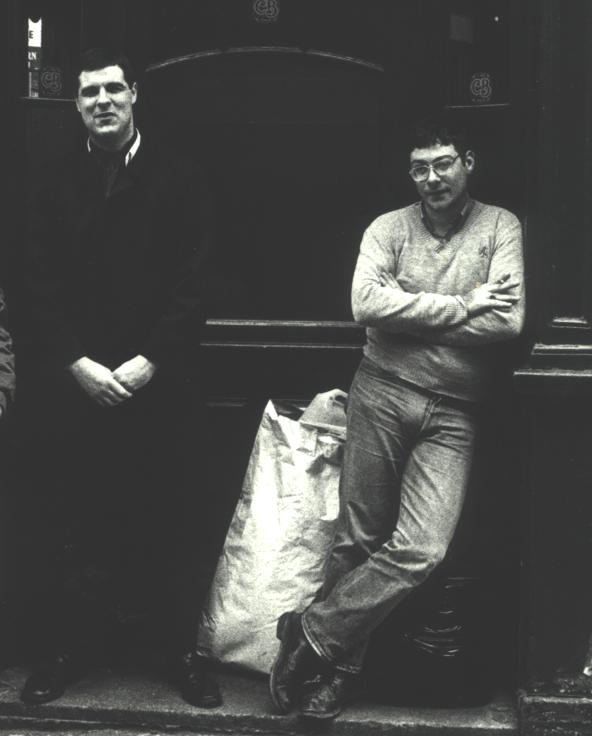
Hoxton Tom McCourt and Roi Pearce of The Last Resort, and later The 4-Skins, outside the Bricklayers Arms, Shoreditch 1983

=== Albums ===
- The Good, The Bad & The 4-Skins (Secret Records (SEC 4), 1982)
- A Fistful Of...4-Skins (Syndicate Records (SYN 1), 1983)
- From Chaos to 1984 (Live) (Syndicate Records (SYN LP 5), 1984)
- The Return (Randale Records (RAN 050), 2010)

==== Collections ====
- A Few 4-Skins More, Vol.1 (Link Records, 1987)
- A Few 4-Skins More, Vol.2 (Link Records, 1987)
- The Wonderful World of the 4-Skins (1987)
- The Best Of 4-Skins (1989)
- The Best of the 4 Skins (Harry May/Link Records, 1997) – limited edition including 7" singles
- Clockwork Skinhead (2000)
- Singles & Rarities (Captain Oi! Records, 2000)
- The Secret Life of the 4-Skins (Captain Oi! Records, 2001)
- History Of... (Double CD, Taang Records, 2003)

=== Singles and EPs ===
- One Law For Them/Brave New World (Clockwork Fun (CF 101), 1981)
- Yesterdays Heroes/Justice/Get Out of my Life (Secret Records (SHH 125), 1981)
- Low Life/Bread Or Blood (Secret Records (SHH 141), 1982)
- Turning the Past into the Present – The 4-Skins, "Thanks For The Memories"/Evil Conduct, "The Way We Feel" (Clockwork Firm/Randale Records (655321 CF-001/RAN 47), 2009)

=== Compilation appearances ===
- "Wonderful World", "Chaos" – Oi! The Album (EMI, 1980)
- "1984", "Sorry" – Strength Thru Oi! (Decca Records, 1981)
- "Evil" – Carry On Oi! (Secret Records, 1981)
- "One Law for Them", "Yesterday's Heroes" – The Secret Life of Punks (Secret Records, 1982)
- "On The Streets" – Son of Oi! (Syndicate, 1983)
- "Clockwork Skinhead", "Plastic Gangster", "Summer Holiday" - Lords Of Oi! (Dressed To Kill, 1997)
- "Glory Days", "Chaos 2007" - Kings of Street Punk (G&R London, 2007)
