= From Chaos to 1984 =

Live album by The 4-Skins
- Released: 1984
- Recorded: Waterloo Road, London
- Genre: Punk rock, Oi!
- Length: 42:54
- Label: Syndicate Records

The 4-Skins chronology
A Fistful Of...4-Skins (1983)	From Chaos to 1984 (1984)	Untitled fourth 4-Skins album (TBA)

From Chaos to 1984 is a live album by English punk rock/Oi! band, The 4-Skins. Released in 1984 on Syndicate Records, it is the band's third and final album. Recorded in mid-1984 in front of an invited audience of friends at a studio in Waterloo Road, London, the album documents the band's farewell concert and final recordings (until 2007's partial reunion).

== Track listing ==
(all songs written by The 4-Skins.)

1. "Wonderful World"
2. "Jealousy"
3. "On the Streets"
4. "Johnny Go Home"
5. "1984"
6. "Bread or Blood"
7. "Saturday"
8. "A.C.A.B."
9. "City Boy"
10. "Five More Years"
11. "Evil"
12. "On File"
13. "Clockwork Skinhead"
14. "Chaos"

== Personnel ==
- Roi Pearce - lead vocals
- Hoxton Tom McCourt - bass guitar
- Ian Bransom - drums
- Paul Swain - guitar
