= Monkey boots =

Style of lace-to-toe boot

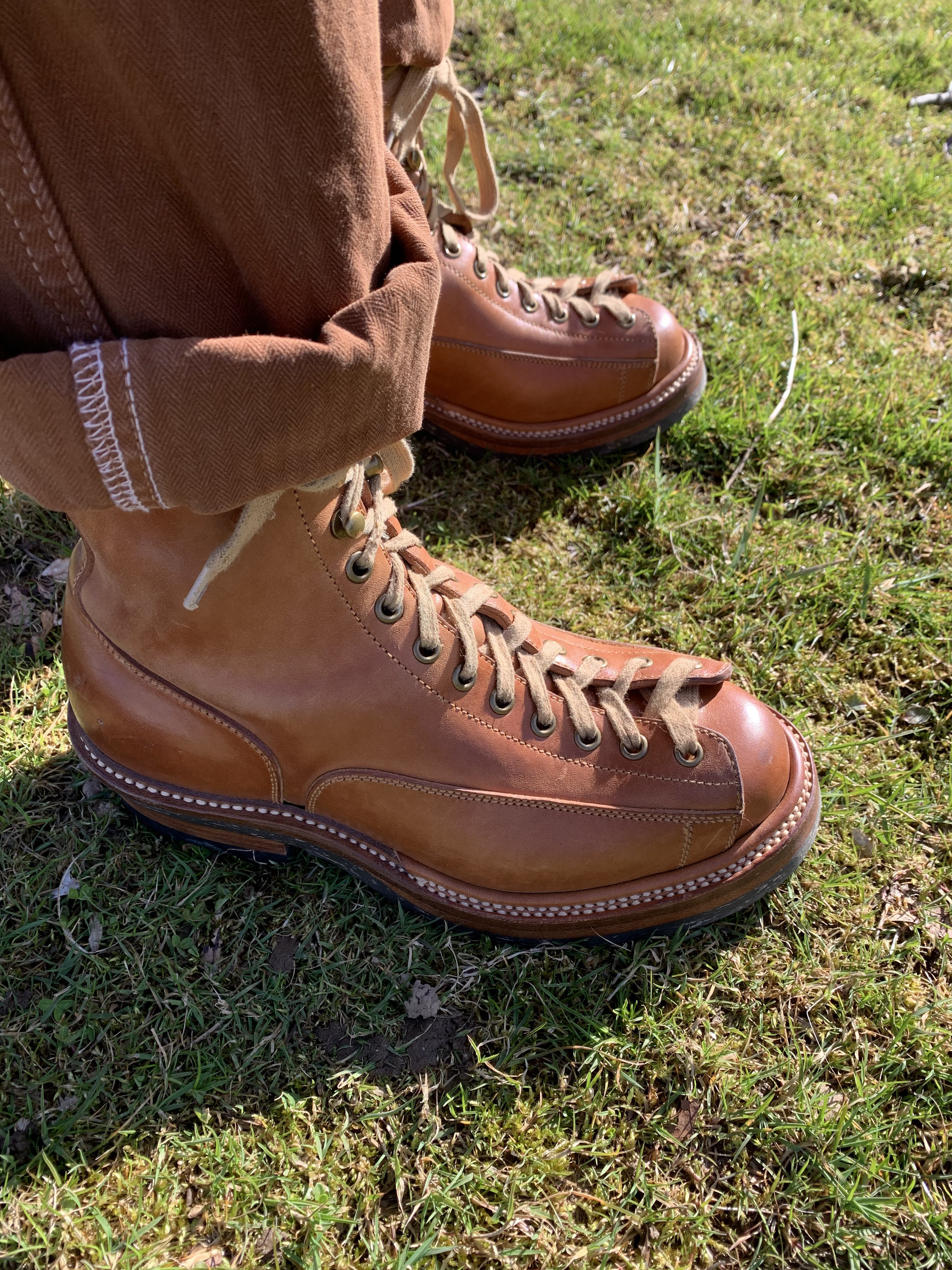
A pair of Flame Panda monkey boots in the lace-to-toe work boot style.

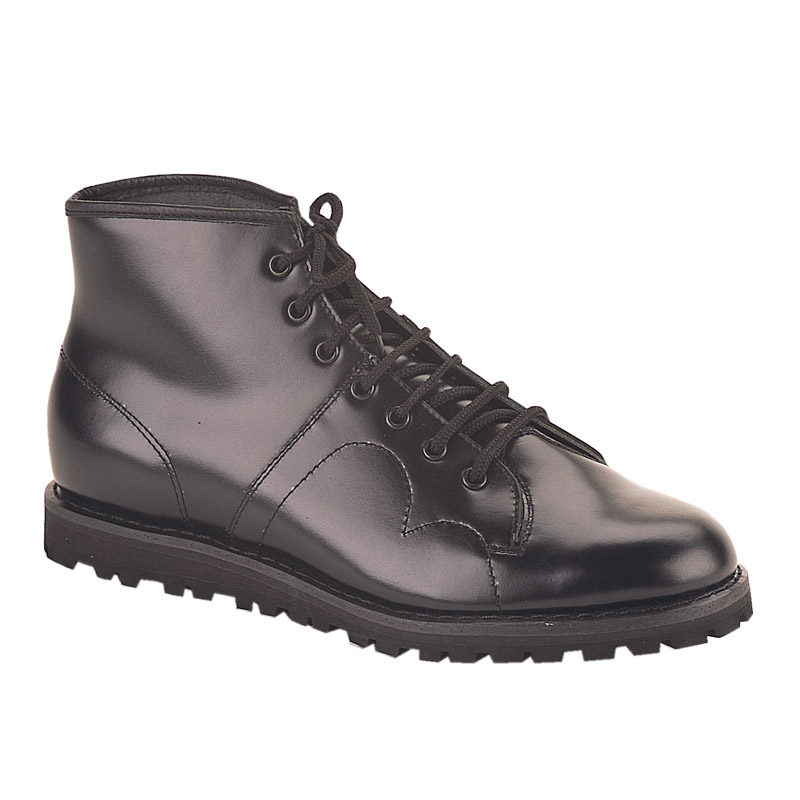
Monkey boot style that became popular in the UK in the 60s and 70s. While the yellow lacing isn't present, note the tractor-tread soles and distinctive stitching.

Monkey boots are a style of lace-to-toe boot that became popular among mod and skinhead subcultures in the United Kingdom and among American workers.

Variations of monkey boots exist across the world and include those popular in the United Kingdom in the 1960s and '70s, and those designed by workwear companies in the US such as Endicott-Johnson, Red Wing, and Thorogood.

The monkey boots popular in the UK have "tractor-tread" outsoles, yellow laces, and typically brown, black, or oxblood leather, while the monkey boots produced by American work boot companies have lace-to-toe construction designed for a more secure fit.

== Origins ==
The exact origins of the monkey boot are unknown, but some of the earliest iterations are from Czechoslovakia during the 1940s and '50s.

Postwar, monkey boots were exported to different parts of Europe, where they became especially popular in the UK during the '60s and '70s.

== Subcultural significance in the UK ==
In the 1960s and '70s, monkey boots became popular in the UK among skinhead and mod subcultures. Monkey boots were often thought to be cheaper than Doc Martens, another popular boot within similar subcultures, and were worn as a fashion statement against conformity by mods and skinheads alike. Many mods and skinheads considered monkey boots to be a part of their fashion uniform, and wore them with pride.

While they were still worn in the '80s and '90s, as the mod and skinhead subcultures shifted and faded, monkey boots became less popular.

=== Perceptions based on gender and age ===
In the UK monkey boots were sometimes seen by mods and skinheads as shoes worn by women and children. While female skinheads and mods tended to wear more androgynous clothing, including boots, monkey boots became associated with women in certain mod and skinhead groups.

== American work boot style ==
In the 1940s, Red Wing, a popular work boot company, developed their work boot style 2996–the Lineman. The boot, with its lace-to-toe design, was constructed for workers climbing electrical poles, so that they were more secure and stable.

In the 1950s Thorogood, an offshoot of the Weinbrenner Shoe Company, produced style No. 633, another lace-to-toe work boot. A roofer boot or bruiser, Thorogood constructed style No. 633 boots for roofers, carpenters, and other workers who benefited from the security of the lace-to-toe design. Sears and Endicott-Johnson also produced their own lace-to-toe worker boots in the 1940s and through the 1960s.

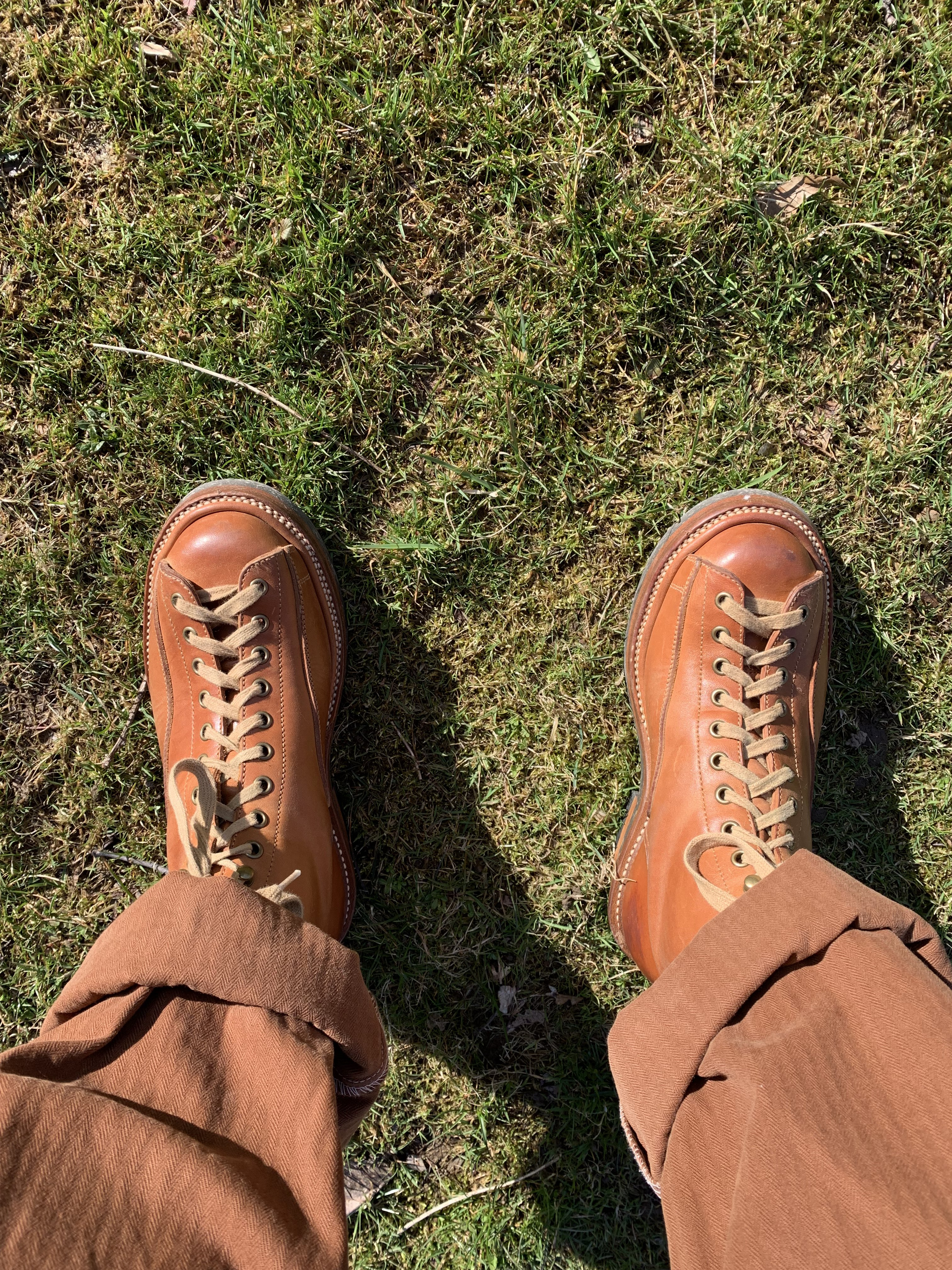
Flame Panda monkey boots from above in the lace-to-toe work boot style.
