= A Fistful Of...4-Skins =

A Fistful of...4-Skins

Studio album by The 4-Skins
- Released: 1983
- Recorded: Alaska Studios, London
- Genres: Punk rock, Oi!
- Length: 45:37; 51:28 (1993 CD reissue)
- Label: Syndicate
- Producer: Ian O'Higgins

The 4-Skins chronology
The Good, The Bad & The 4-Skins (1982)	A Fistful of...4-Skins (1983)	From Chaos to 1984 (1984)

A Fistful of...4-Skins is the second studio album by English punk rock/Oi! band, The 4-Skins, released in 1983 by Syndicate Records. In comparison to The 4-Skins' previous material, "A Fistful Of...4-Skins" featured a slower, heavier, more melodic, hard rock-based sound.

Less successful than its predecessor, the album charted outside the Top 30 on the UK independent chart. The band members claimed that this was due to chart manipulation. The album was later combined with debut LP, The Good, The Bad & The 4-Skins (omitting the track "One Law for Them" from that album due to space limitations) and released on a single CD by Link Records in 1987 as A Few 4-Skins More, Vol.1.

Following the breakup of the line-up that recorded the band's previous album, The Good, The Bad & The 4-Skins, Hoxton Tom McCourt had assembled a new line-up (the fourth overall) including former The Last Resort singer Roi Pearce, and future Skrewdriver guitarist, Paul Swain.

== Track listing ==
Source: Amazon

All tracks are written by McCourt/Pearce/Bransom/Swain.

No.	Title	Length
1.	"5 More Years"	3:20
2.	"Waiting For A Friend"	3:36
3.	"Johnny Go Home"	2:59
4.	"The Gambler"	3:30
5.	"I'll Stick To My Guns"	2:53
6.	"On File"	3:57
7.	"Forgotten Hero"	4:01
8.	"The Spy From Alaska"	2:57
9.	"H.M.P."	3:10
10.	"No Excuse"	3:33
11.	"Betrayed"	3:40
12.	"City Boy"	3:51
13.	"New War"	4:10

CD reissue bonus tracks
No.	Title	Length
14.	"On The Streets"	2:46
15.	"Saturday" (Demo)	3:05

== Personnel ==
- Roi Pearce – lead vocals
- Hoxton Tom McCourt – bass guitar, lead vocal on "New War"
- Ian Bransom – drums
- Paul Swain – guitar
- Keith Bollock Brother – backing vocals
- Neil Barker – backing vocals
