= Weinbrenner =

Weinbrenner may refer to:

- Weinbrenner Shoe Company, an American shoe company
- Friedrich Weinbrenner (1766–1826), German architect and city planner
