= The Good, The Bad & The 4-Skins =

Studio album by The 4-Skins
- Released: June 1982
- Recorded: Matrix Studios, London
- Genre: Punk rock, Oi!, Ska
- Length: 41:40; 57:29 (2007 CD reissue)
- Label: Secret Records
- Producer: Tim Thompson/The 4-Skins

The 4-Skins chronology
| The Good, The Bad & The 4-Skins (1982) | A Fistful Of...4-Skins (1983) |

Professional ratings
Review scores
| Source | Rating |
|---|---|
| Allmusic | 4/5 stars |

The Good, The Bad & The 4-Skins is the first album by English punk rock/Oi! band, The 4-Skins. Released in June 1982 on Secret Records, the album topped the UK independent and punk charts, and entered the Top 100 of the UK Albums Chart.

Side A of the original LP contained studio recordings, and Side B featured live versions of several previously released songs. The album was later combined with follow-up release, A Fistful Of...4-Skins (omitting the track "One Law for Them" due to space limitations) and released on a single CD by Link Records in 1987 as A Few 4-Skins More, Vol.1.

Despite being The 4-Skins' debut LP, it was in fact recorded by the third stable line-up of the band, with bassist Hoxton Tom McCourt being the sole member of the original 1979 line-up. However, the group's original drummer (and manager at that point), Gary Hitchcock wrote and performed vocals on the album's 2 Tone-style ska punk lead track.

== Track listing ==
(all songs written by The 4-Skins except where noted.)

1. "Plastic Gangsters" (Hitchcock)
2. "Jealousy"
3. "Yesterday's Heroes"
4. "Justice"
5. "Jack the Lad"
6. "Remembrance Day"
7. "Manifesto"
8. "Wonderful World" (live)
9. "1984" (live)
10. "Sorry" (live)
11. "Evil" (live)
12. "I Don't Wanna Die" (live)
13. "A.C.A.B." (live)
14. "Chaos" (live)
15. "One Law For Them"
  CD reissue bonus tracks:
16. "Low Life"
17. "Bread or Blood"
18. "Get Out of My Life"
19. "Seems to Me"
20. "Norman"

== Personnel ==
- Tony 'Panther' Cummins - lead vocals
- Hoxton Tom McCourt - bass guitar
- John Jacobs - guitar, keyboards
- Pete Abbot - drums
- Gary Hitchcock - lead vocals on "Plastic Gangsters"
