= G&R London =

- Founded: 2007
- Founder: Mick Geggus and Andy Russell
- Genre: Punk rock, rock music, R&B
- Country of origin: UK
- Official website: http://gandrlondon.com/

G&R London is an independent record label based in London, England which was established in 2007. The label was set up by Cockney Rejects guitarist Mick Geggus and the original East End Badoes bassist Andy Russell, with the intention of recording and promoting new material from established and newer bands. The first album to be released on the label was Unforgiven by Cockney Rejects on 15 May 2007.

== Bands ==
- The 4-Skins
- Bad Manners
- The Business
- Cockney Rejects
- The East End Badoes
- The Gonads
- The Masons
- The Orgasm Guerillas
- The Postmen
- Rancid
- Red Alert
- The Secret Members
- Trebek
- The Usual Suspects

== See also ==
- List of record labels
