= Unheard Rejects =

Compilation album by Cockney Rejects
- Released: 1985
- Genre: Punk rock, Oi!, Street punk
- Label: Wonderful World

Cockney Rejects chronology
Quiet Storm (1984)	Unheard Rejects (1985)	Lethal (1990)

Unheard Rejects is an album by the band Cockney Rejects released in 1985. It is a collection of demo tracks recorded between 1979 and 1981.

== Track listing ==
1. "It Can't Be True"
2. "1984"
3. "Nobody Knows"
4. "I Need It Again"
5. "Dead Generation"
6. "No Time"
7. "It Will Only Ever Be"
8. "Going Back Home"
9. "It's Up To You"
10. "Ruttling Orange Peel"
11. "Man's Life In The Army"
12. "Listen"
