= Quiet Storm (Cockney Rejects album) =

1984 album by Cockney Rejects

Studio album by Cockney Rejects
- Released: 1984
- Genre: Hard rock
- Label: Heavy Metal

Cockney Rejects chronology
The Wild Ones (1982)	Quiet Storm (1984)	Unheard Rejects (1985)

Quiet Storm is the fifth album by the band Cockney Rejects, released in 1984.

By 1984, the Rejects had encountered a number of violent episodes at their gigs, and decided to concentrate their efforts on recording new music. The result, head on Quiet Storm, reflects band members' interest in classic rock and hard rock, an interest which predated their exposure to the Sex Pistols. Future releases saw the band returning to familiar punk rock and Oi! territory, encouraged by renewed interest accompanying the praise of Cockney Rejects from the likes of members of Green Day and Rancid.

== Track listing ==
1. "It Ain't Nothing" - 4.30
2. "I Saw the Light" - 4.26
3. "Back to the Start" - 6.01
4. "I Can't Forget" - 4.12
5. "Feeling My Way" - 3.26
6. "Quiet Storm" - 3.02
7. "Leave It" - 3.49
8. "Fourth Summer" - 2.31
9. "Jog On" - 4.35

== Personnel ==
Cockney Rejects

- Keith Warrington - drums
- Micky Geggus - guitar, bass
- Jefferson Turner - vocals
- Ian Campbell - bass
