= Lethal (Cockney Rejects album) =

Studio album by Cockney Rejects
- Released: 1990
- Genre: Punk rock, Hard rock, heavy metal, NWOBHM
- Label: Neat
- Producer: Mick Geggus

Cockney Rejects chronology
Unheard Rejects (1985)	Lethal (1990)	Out of the Gutter (2002)

Lethal is an album by the English punk rock band Cockney Rejects released in 1990.

== Track listing ==
1. "Bad Man Down" (3.45)
2. "Penitentiary" (4.26)
3. "Struttin' My Stuff" (3.35)
4. "Lethal Weapon" (3.42)
5. "Rough Diamond" (4.51)
6. "Go Get It" (3.05)
7. "Down 'N' Out" (2.48)
8. "One Way Ticket" (6.11)
9. "Once a Rocker" (5.37)
10. "Take Me Higher" (4.05)
11. "Down the Line" (3.17)
12. "Mean City" (3.30)
13. "See You Later" (4.45)
