= Greatest Hits Vol. II (Cockney Rejects album) =

Studio album by Cockney Rejects
- Released: 30 September 1980
- Genre: Punk rock, Oi!
- Label: EMI
- Producer: Layabout Briggs, Hippy Wilson

Cockney Rejects chronology
Greatest Hits Vol. 1 (1980)	Greatest Hits Vol. II (1980)	The Power and the Glory (1981)

Greatest Hits Vol. II is the second album by the band Cockney Rejects released in 1980. Despite the title, it is not a greatest hits compilation album.

== Track listing ==
All tracks composed by the Cockney Rejects; except where noted

1. "War on the Terraces" - 2:39
2. "In the Underworld" - 2:46
3. "Oi! Oi! Oi!" - 3:26
4. "Hate of the City" - 3:05
5. "With the Boys" - 2:20
6. "Urban Guerilla" - 2:13
7. "The Rocker" - 2:32
8. "The Greatest Cockney Rip Off" - 2:11
9. "Maybe It's Because I'm a Londoner" (Hubert Gregg)
10. "Sitting In A Cell" - 2:49
11. "On The Waterfront" - 3:55
12. "We Can Do Anything" - 2:34
13. "It's Alright" - 2:22
14. "Subculture" - 1:25
15. "Blockbuster" - 4:50 (Nicky Chinn, Mike Chapman)

== Personnel ==
Cockney Rejects

- Vince Riordan - bass, vocals
- Mick Geggus - guitar, vocals
- Stinky Turner - vocals
- Nigel Wolfe - drums
