= The Power and the Glory (Cockney Rejects album) =

Studio album by Cockney Rejects
- Released: 1981
- Genre: Punk rock, Oi!, power pop
- Label: EMI
- Producer: Steve Churchyard

Cockney Rejects chronology
Greatest Hits Vol. II (1980)	The Power and the Glory (1981)	The Wild Ones (1982)

Professional ratings
Review scores
Source	Rating
Sounds	4/5 stars

The Power and the Glory is the third studio album by the band Cockney Rejects released in 1981.

== Track listing ==
1. "The Power & the Glory"
2. "Because I'm in Love"
3. "On the Run"
4. "Lumon"
5. "Friends"
6. "Teenage Fantasy"
7. "It's Over"
8. "On the Streets Again"
9. "BYC"
10. "The Greatest Story Ever Told"

All song written by Cockney Rejects.
