= The Wild Ones (album) =

Studio album by Cockney Rejects
- Released: 1982
- Recorded: November 1981 – February 1982
- Studio: Parkgate Studios (East Sussex). Redan Recorders (London)
- Genre: Heavy metal
- Label: A.K.A.
- Producer: Pete Way

Cockney Rejects chronology
The Power and the Glory (1981)	The Wild Ones (1982)	Quiet Storm (1984)

The Wild Ones is the fourth album by the English band Cockney Rejects, released in 1982.

== Track listing ==
1. "Way of the Rocker"
2. "City of the Lights"
3. "Rock N' Roll Dream"
4. "Till the End of the Day"
5. "Some Play Dirty"
6. "Satellite City"
7. "Let Me Rock You"
8. "Victim of the Cheap Wine"
9. "Hells a Long Way to Go"
10. "Heat of the Night"

All song written by Cockney Rejects except Till the End of the Day, written by Ray Davies

== Personnel ==
- Vinnie Riordan - Bass
- Keith Warrington - Drums
- Micky Geggus - Guitar
- Jefferson Turner - Vocals

Gary Edwards - Engineer Johnny Schinas - Assistant Engineer Ross Halfin- Phorography Crunch - Design
