= Hoxton Tom McCourt =

Former bassist and bandleader

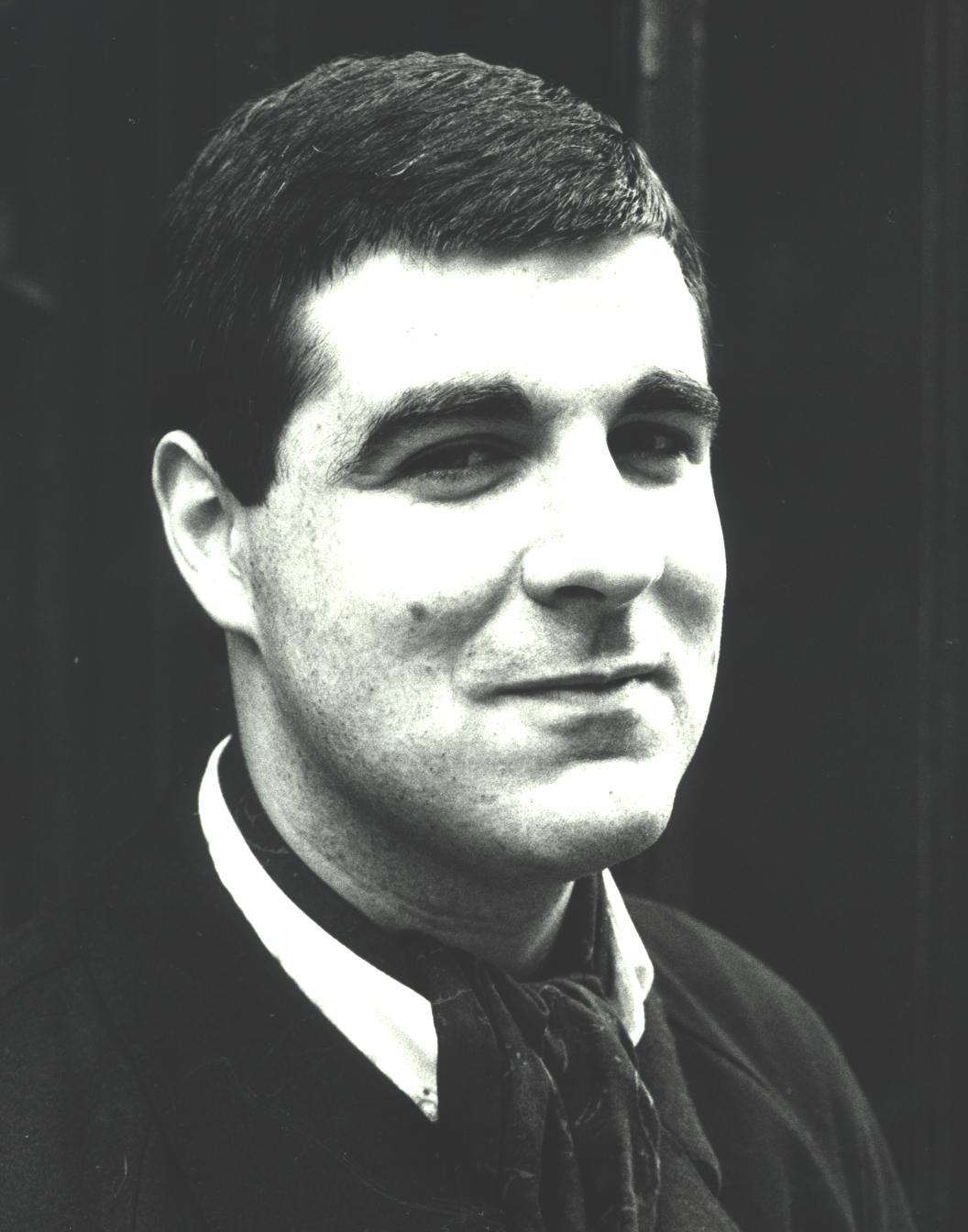
- McCourt outside the Bricklayers Arms in Shoreditch, 1983

Background information
- Also known as: Hoxton Tom
- Born: 1961 (age 64–65); Shoreditch, London, England
- Genres: Punk rock; Oi!
- Occupations: Musician; songwriter
- Instruments: Bass; guitar
- Years active: 1979–1984
- Formerly of: The 4-Skins

'Hoxton' Tom McCourt (born 1961) is the former bassist and bandleader of punk rock/Oi! band, The 4-Skins. He was one of the most influential members of the skinhead revival of 1977 to 1978, the mod revival of 1978 to 1979 and the Oi! movement from 1979 to 1984.

McCourt was born in Hoxton, and was given the nickname Hoxton Tom by West Ham United supporters, at a time when a number of key people from outside West Ham's natural recruiting ground were given tags after the area they came from. He was and still is a Tottenham Hotspur F.C. supporter, but went to West Ham United matches with friends, many of whom were part of the Inter City Firm (ICF), which he became associated with.

== Career ==
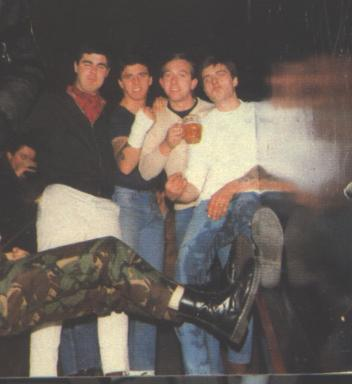
Hoxton Tom McCourt (of the 4-Skins), Carlton Leach (of the Inter City Firm), Gary Dickle and Vince Riordan (of Cockney Rejects) at the Moonlight Club, west Hampstead, 1980.

Born in Shoreditch, London, England and an engineer by trade, Tom McCourt formed The 4-Skins in late 1979 along with Gary Hodges, Steve 'H' Harmer and Gary Hitchcock. Their first concert was in summer 1980, supporting The Damned and Cockney Rejects at the Bridge House in Canning Town. McCourt, Hodges and Harmer were all part of the Cockney Rejects road crew, as featured on the back cover of the album Greatest Hits Volume 1.

McCourt played guitar on The 4-Skins' first commercially released recordings (two songs on EMI's 1980 punk compilation, Oi! The Album) before switching to bass for the remainder of the band's existence. McCourt performed vocals in the song "New War", on the 1984 album A Fistful of 4-Skins, and performed lead vocals on a re-recorded version of "Chaos", which was released for the first time on the 2000 4-skins compilation Singles & Rarities.

McCourt was a continuous member of the band through its original incarnation, writing all of the music from 1979 to 1984, as well as writing most of the lyrics after Hodges' departure. McCourt was also a DJ at skinhead/mod bars and clubs in North and East London, such as the Blue Coat Boy at The Angel, Islington. He was known for his encyclopaedic knowledge of 1960s soul music, reggae and ska. McCourt has not joined the reformed line-up of The 4-Skins because, in his opinion, the band "was about youth".

== Subcultural associations ==
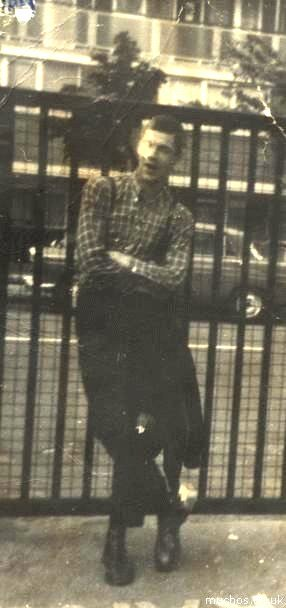
Hoxton Tom McCourt in summer 1977, during the skinhead revival.

McCourt became a skinhead in early 1977, in reaction to the way that punk had become commercialised, and seeking a sharper clothing style. The Black Sun Gazette credits McCourt, more than any other, with initiating and popularising the revival of the traditional skinhead subculture.

In 1978, McCourt became a roadie for the punk rock band Menace, and had become a suedehead, possibly the first since the originals in the early 1970s. McCourt also became involved in the mod revival of 1978 and 1979. The mod fanzine Maximum Speed identified him as one of the faces of the period, as did later books on the mod revival. His photograph was featured on the album liner of Secret Affair's Glory Boys. McCourt wore the original skinhead and suedehead fashions of the late 1960s and early 1970s, which were quite different from the styles worn by many Oi! skinheads and white power skinheads of the 1980s.

Despite his dapper, dandyish appearance, McCourt had a reputation as a hard character. He took an uncompromising view against both the far left and far right, and was known as a social liberal. The 4-Skins and their colleagues, Cockney Rejects, met and overcame violent opposition from both militant leftists and right-wing extremists. The Italian Oi! band, Asociale, wrote the song "Hoxton Tom for President" in appreciation of McCourt's street-based politics.
