= Suedehead (subculture) =

Early-1970s offshoot of skinhead subculture in the United Kingdom and Ireland

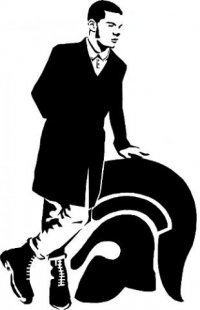
- Illustration of a male suedehead leaning on the Trojan Records logo
- Years active: 1970s–1980s
- Country: United Kingdom
- Major figures: Hoxton Tom McCourt
- Influences: Skinhead, Mod
- Influenced: Mod revival

The suedehead subculture was an early-1970s offshoot of skinhead subculture in the United Kingdom and Ireland. Although sharing similarities to 1960s skinheads, suedeheads grew their hair longer and dressed more formally. Although often working class like skinheads, some had white collar jobs. A female suedehead was a sort.

Suedeheads wore brogues, loafers or basketweave Norwegians instead of heavy boots. Some suedeheads wore suits (especially in check patterns such as Prince of Wales and dogtooth) and other dressy outfits as everyday wear instead of just at dancehalls. Crombie-style overcoats and sheepskin coats became common. Most London suedeheads wore a silk handkerchief in the chest pocket of their Crombie, which also had a circular tie-pin through the Crombie and the handkerchief. Shirts often had large button-down collars, usually either pointed or rounded, called butterfly collars. The top shirts were Ben Sherman's with a back pleat and top loop. Early on, the most common style was a large windowpane check worn under a tank top. At the height of the era, shirts changed to muted pastel shades, with the colour being governed by the day of the week. Sta-Prest trousers became worn more than jeans, which had been common with skinheads. Although the most popular form of trousers were the 2Tone Tonik, which changed colour as they moved. The most common base colours were blue and green, whilst the most favoured secondary colours were red, yellow and gold. Another characteristic was coloured socks—such as solid red or blue—instead of plain black or white.

Suedeheads shared the skinheads' interest in rocksteady, reggae, soul, R&B, funk and ska, but some suedeheads also listened to British glam rock bands such as The Sweet, Slade, Ziggy Stardust and Mott the Hoople. In the late 1970s, most suedeheads closely followed groups such as The Beat, Madness, the Specials and other artists on the 2Tone record label.

Suedeheads were portrayed in the east end London-based film Bronco Bullfrog and the Richard Allen novel Suedehead. In the late 1970s, a suedehead revival developed following the 1977 skinhead revival. This originated with a small number of individuals such as Hoxton Tom McCourt, who also became involved with the mod revival of the late 1970s.

In the early- to mid-1970s, many suedeheads also owned Lambretta scooters and there was a type of mini-mod revival. It was a crossover movement based on style, music, clothes and was most common amongst working-class teenagers living in the larger inner-city conurbations.

In the 1980s, a number of fanzines were dedicated to the suedehead culture. This includes The Suedehead Times, which released three issues between 1985 and 1986.

Morrissey released a single called "Suedehead" in 1988, although the lyrics appear to have nothing to do with suedehead subculture.
