= Greatest Hits Volume 1 (Cockney Rejects album) =

Greatest Hits Vol. 1

Studio album by Cockney Rejects
- Released: 7 March 1980
- Recorded: November – December 1979
- Studios: Polydor Studios; Rock City Studios
- Genres: Punk rock, Oi!
- Label: EMI
- Producers: Jimmy Pursey, Peter Wilson

Cockney Rejects chronology
Greatest Hits Vol. 1 (1980)	Greatest Hits Vol. 2 (1980)

Professional ratings
Review scores
Source	Rating
Smash Hits	1/10
Sounds	5/5 stars
Record Mirror	1.5/5 stars

Greatest Hits Vol. 1 is the first album by the band Cockney Rejects released in 1980. Despite the title, it is not a greatest hits compilation album.

== Track listing ==
All songs by "Stinky" Turner, Mick Geggus and Vince Riordan unless otherwise noted.

1. "I'm Not a Fool" - 3:49 (Turner, Geggus, Riordan, Scott)
2. "Headbanger" - 1:28
3. "Bad Man" - 2:37
4. "Fighting in the Street" - 2:37
5. "Shitter" - 1:53
6. "Here They Come Again" - 2:47
7. "Join the Rejects" - 2:43
8. "East End" - 2:14 (Turner, Geggus)
9. "The New Song" - 2:28
10. "Police Car" - 1:58 (Turner, Geggus)
11. "Someone Like You" - 2:54
12. "They're Gonna Put Me Away" - 1:18
13. "Are You Ready to Ruck" - 2:19
14. "Where the Hell Is Babylon" - 2:26

== Personnel ==
Cockney Rejects

- Stinky Turner - vocals
- Mick Geggus - guitar, vocals
- Vince Riordan - bass, vocals
- Andy Scott - drums
