= Weinbrenner Shoe Company =

American shoe manufacturer

Coordinates: 45.179496°N 89.69997°W

- Industry: Footwear
- Founded: 1892
- Fate: Brand name Acquired by Bata Corporation In Some Countries to Manufacture Footwears
- Headquarters: Merrill, Wisconsin, United States
- Products: Boots
- Divisions: Thorogood
- Website: www.weinbrennerusa.com

Weinbrenner Shoe Company is an American manufacturer of safety, military, work and uniform footwear. It was established in 1892 and the headquarters are located in Merrill, Wisconsin.

This manufacturer is best known for the Thorogood brand of work boots.

== History ==
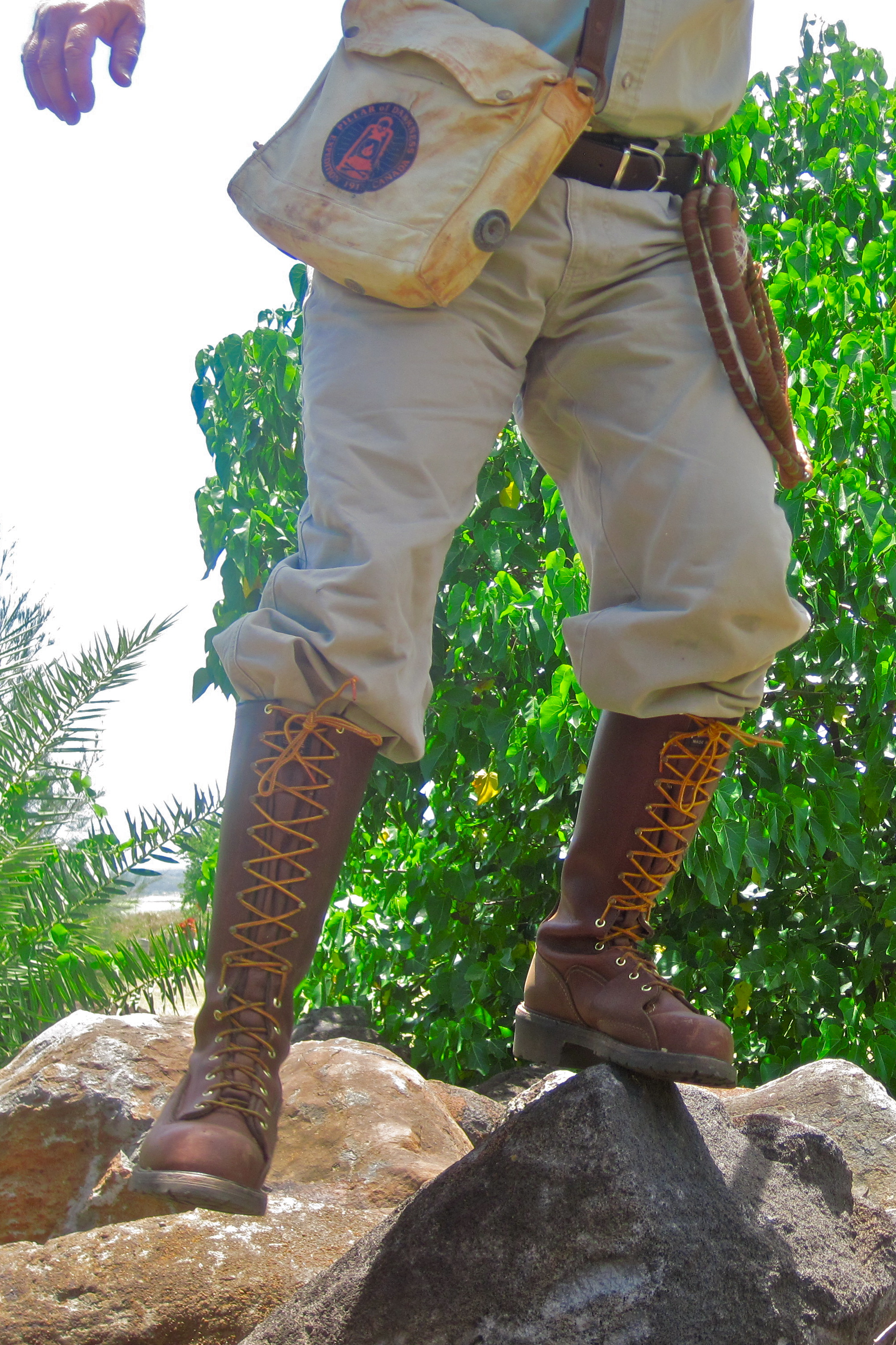
A pair of Thorogood boots

The Weinbrenner Shoe Company was founded by Albert H. Weinbrenner, the son of a German immigrant and cobbler. Originally working as an apprentice for his father repairing outsoles, he left at age 27 in 1892 to start his own business with Joseph Pfeifer. The two opened a small cobblery in Milwaukee, Wisconsin called "Weinbrenner and Pfeifer", specializing in "jobbing" shoes (referred to today as work boots). After eight years in repair and sale, the pair transitioned into manufacturing. In 1900 they purchased the Knoll Shoe Company for $1,500. The new company they formed was named the Albert H. Weinbrenner Company.

The company grew quickly, reaching production of 60 pairs of boots per day by 1902 and 2,500 pairs per day by 1905. In 1909, Weinbrenner moved to a new, larger factory of 158,000 square feet. Its innovate exterior design for the period led to its feature in several national architectural magazines. In the 1910s, the company began to diversify into producing boot styles designed for more particular trades. During the first World War, they were a major contributor of military boots for US Army infantry.

In 1918, the Thorogood brand of work boots was introduced and quickly garnered popularity. It remains Weinbrenner's most well-known brand by a significant margin.

In 1935, construction began on a new manufacturing plant in Marshfield, Wisconsin in order to raise production capacity to 3–4,000 boots per day. In the following few years, new plants were also built in Merrill, Wisconsin and Antigo, Wisconsin. During the second World War, all production was directed towards the war effort. This led to the development of improved safety technology such as steel safety-toe caps, protective outsoles, and metatarsal guards.

In 1943, workers at Weinbrenner unionized under the International Boot and Shoe Workers Union, a first step in a long history of union support in the company (currently, the company is represented by the United Food and Commercial Workers International Union).

Production of the "Hike 'n Camp" boot designed for the Boy Scouts began in 1964. This style (now the "814-4201") would become Weinbrenner's best selling boot of all time. Its design is widely considered the signature boot for the construction industry.

In 2000, workers took ownership of the company in the form of an Employee Stock Ownership Plan (ESOP).

Today Weinbrenner is America's largest manufacturer of "Made in USA" footwear, selling over 125 styles of domestic footwear. Including imported lines, it produces 250 styles. The Merrill manufacturing plant operates as the current headquarters. In 2019, Jeff Burns was named president of the company. In the same year, it was named Merrill's Business of the Year.
