= Cockney Rejects =

English punk rock band

- Also known as: The Rejects
- Origin: East London, England
- Genres: Punk rock; Oi!
- Years active: 1978–1985, 1987–1991, 1999–present
- Label: Cadiz Music
- Members: Jeff Geggus aka Jeff 'Stinky' Turner; Michael Algar aka Olga; JJ Pearce aka JJ Kaos; Ray Bussey aka Ray Dust
- Past members: Mick Geggus; Vince Riordan; Paul Harvey; Chris Murrell; Andy Scott; Nigel Woolf; Ian Campbell; Keith Warrington; Nobby Cobb; Tony Van Frater; Andrew Laing; Joe Perry Sansome
- Website: cockneyrejects.com

Cockney Rejects are an English Oi! / Street punk band that formed in Custom House, East London, in 1978. Their 1980 song "Oi, Oi, Oi" was the inspiration for the name of the Oi! music genre. The original band members were supporters of West Ham United, and the band pays tribute to the club with their hit cover version of "I'm Forever Blowing Bubbles", a song traditionally sung by West Ham supporters.

== Career ==
The Cockney Rejects were formed by the brothers Mick and Jeff Geggus in 1978. Vince Riordan joined the band the following year.

Signed by EMI after just four gigs, the Cockney Rejects quickly rose to fame with sell-out UK tours and a chart-topping debut album. Their wild antics on Top of the Pops earned them a ban from the show, adding to their rebellious reputation. In 1980, they recorded the iconic "I'm Forever Blowing Bubbles" to celebrate West Ham United's FA Cup final appearance.

In January 2024, Micky Geggus, Vince Riordan and Joe Sansome all left the band, and lead singer Jeff "Stinky" Turner brought in a new line up featuring Olga (Toy Dolls) on guitar, JJ Kaos (Last Resort, Anti-Nowhere League) on bass, and Ray Dust (The Business, Argy Bargy) on drums.

Mick Geggus went on to form his new band Punch Drunk Saints releasing their self titled debut album on Cadiz Music in 2025

In August 2026 Jeff Turner published the follow-up to his critically-acclaimed autobiography Cockney Reject. Cockney Reject II - I Love Being Me, written with Vive Le Rock journalist Guy Shankland and was published via Cadiz Music .

== Members ==
Current members

- Jeff Geggus ("Stinky" Turner) – vocals (1978–present)
- Michael Algar (Olga) – guitar (2024-present)
- JJ Pearce – bass (2024-present)
- Ray Bussey – drums (2024-present)

Former members

- Mick Geggus – guitar (1978–2024)
- Vince Riordan – bass (1979–1983, 1987–1991, 2015–2024)
- Chris Murrell – bass (1978–1979)
- Paul Harvey – drums (1978–1979)
- Andy Scott – drums (1979–1980)
- Nigel Woolf – drums (1980)
- Keith Warrington – drums (1980–1985, 1987–1991)
- Ian Campbell – bass (1983–1985)
- Tony Van Frater – bass (1999–2015; died 2015)
- Andrew Laing – drums (1999–2000, 2007–2017; died 2023)
- Les Cobb – drums (2000–2007)
- Joe Perry Sansome – drums (2017–2024)

== Discography ==
=== Albums ===
- Greatest Hits Vol. 1 (EMI, 1980)
- Greatest Hits Vol. II (EMI, 1980)
- The Power and the Glory (EMI, 1981)
- The Wild Ones (A.K.A. Records, 1982)
- Quiet Storm (Heavy Metal Records, 1984)
- Lethal (Neat Records, 1990)
- Out of the Gutter (Captain Oi Records, 2002)
- Unforgiven (CD - G&R Records, 2007 / Vinyl LP - Cadiz Music, 2024)
- East End Babylon (CD, LP - Cadiz Music, 2012)
- Power Grab (CD, LP, Boxset - Cadiz Music, 2022)

=== Compilation and live albums ===
- Greatest Hits Vol. 3 (Live & Loud) (1981)
- Unheard Rejects (1985 - collection of demo tracks recorded between 1979 and 1981)
- We Are the Firm (1986)
- The Best of the Cockney Rejects (1993)
- The Punk Singles Collection (Dojo, 1997)
- Oi! Oi! Oi! (Castle, 1997)
- Greatest Hits Volume 4: Here They Come Again (Rhythm Vicar, 2000 - reissued as Back on the Street - Victory Records, 2000)
- Join the Rejects, the Zonophone Years '79-'81 (EMI, )
- Hammer - The Classic Rock Years (4CD Box - Cadiz Music 2013)
- At the BBC: The John Peel Sessions 1979-1980 (CD, LP - Cadiz Music 2026)

=== EPs and singles ===
- "Flares & Slippers" b/w "I Wanna Be a Star" / "Police Car" (7-inch, EP) (Small Wonder, 1979)
- "I'm Not a Fool" b/w "East End" (7-inch single) (EMI, 1979) UK No. 65
- "Bad Man" b/w "New Song" (7-inch) (EMI, 1980) UK No. 65
- "The Greatest Cockney Rip Off" b/w "Hate of the City" (7-inch. Limited Edition in Yellow Vinyl) (EMI/Zonophone, 1980) UK No. 21
- "I'm Forever Blowing Bubbles" b/w "West Side Boys" (7-inch) (EMI/Zonophone, 1980) UK No. 35
- "We Can Do Anything" b/w "15 Nights" (7-inch) (EMI/Zonophone, 1980) UK No. 65
- "We Are the Firm" (7-inch) (EMI/Zonophone, 1980) UK No. 54
- "Easy Life" (7-inch, Live EP) (EMI/Zonophone, 1981)
- "On the Streets Again" (7-inch) (EMI/Zonophone, 1981)
- "Till the End of the Day" (7-inch) (AKA 1982)
- "Back to the Start" (7-inch) (Heavy Metal Records, 1984)
- "It's Gonna Kick Off!" (7-inch, EP) (Cadiz Music, 2016)
- "Goodbye Upton Park" b/w "Bubbles" (7-inch) (Cadiz Music, 2016)
- "Bubbles" b/w "The Rocker" (7-inch Picture Disc) (Cadiz Music, 2019)
- "Chapecoense" b/w "Boss of Bosses" (7-inch) (Cadiz Music, 2019)

=== Appearances ===
- Oi! The Album (1980)
- Total Noise (7-inch EP - 1983 - as Dead Generation)
- Lords of Oi! (Dressed to Kill, 1997)

==== DVDs ====
- East End to the West End - Live at the Mean Fiddler 2007 - DVD & CD
- East End Babylon - The Story of the Cockney Rejects - DVD
