= List of street punk bands =

== A ==
- Abrasive Wheels
- A Global Threat
- The Analogs
- Antidote
- Anti-Flag

== B ==
- Blaggers I.T.A.
- The Blood
- The Boils
- The Briggs

== C ==
- Career Soldiers
- The Casualties
- Cheap Sex
- The Chisel
- Clit 45
- Cock Sparrer

== D ==
- Defiance
- Discharge
- The Distillers
- The Devotchkas
- Dogsflesh
- Dropkick Murphys
- The Ducky Boys

== F ==
- Foreign Legion

== G ==
- GBH

== K ==
- The Kings of Nuthin'
- Klasse Kriminale

== L ==
- Los Fastidios
- Lower Class Brats
- Litmus Green
- Lars Frederiksen and the Bastards

== M ==
- Major Accident

== O ==
- One Man Army
- Oxymoron

== P ==
- Picture Frame Seduction
- The Press

== R ==
- The Rabble
- Rancid
- Red London
- The Restarts
- Roger Miret and the Disasters
- Rux

== S ==
- Street Dogs
- SS-Kaliert
- Swingin' Utters

== T ==
- The Exploited
- Time Again
- Total Chaos

== U ==
- The Unseen
- U.S. Bombs
- U.K. Subs

== V ==
- The Virus
- The Varukers
