= List of musicians in the second wave of punk rock =

This is a list of bands that are considered part of the second wave of punk rock, beginning in the early- (mid-) to late 1980s.

== A ==
- AFI
- Agent Orange
- Alkaline Trio
- All
- Amebix
- Anti System
- Antidote
- Antisect
- Anti-Flag
- Anti-Establishment
- Anti-Nowhere League
- Anti-Scrunti Faction
- The Apostles
- Attila the Stockbroker

== B ==
- Bad Brains
- Bad Religion
- Bickley
- Big Black
- Big Boys
- Big Drill Car
- Bikini Kill
- Blaggers I.T.A.
- Blatz
- Boikot
- Bored Suburban Youth
- Born Against
- Bouncing Souls
- Broken Bones

== C ==
- The Casualties
- Chaotic Dischord
- Charged GBH
- Chemical People
- Chumbawamba
- Chaos UK
- Circle Jerks
- Citizen Fish
- Coca Carola
- Cockney Rejects
- Conflict
- Cows
- Crass
- Crimpshrine
- Cringer
- Cro-Mags
- Crucifucks
- Corrosion of Conformity

== D ==
- D.O.A.
- Daisy Chainsaw
- Dayglo Abortions
- Dead Kennedys
- De Heideroosjes
- Dead Milkmen
- Descendents
- Die Ärzte
- Die Kassierer
- Dicks
- Discharge
- Down By Law
- Drei Flaschen
- Dritte Wahl

== E ==
- Electric Frankenstein
- Eskorbuto
- Excuse 17
- The Exploited

== F ==
- Face to Face
- The Faction
- The Faith
- Fifteen
- Firehose
- Flatcat
- The Flatliners
- The Flesh Eaters
- Fleshies
- Flipper
- Flux of Pink Indians
- Frenzal Rhomb
- Frightwig
- Fugazi

== G ==
- Good Riddance
- Government Issue
- Guttermouth
- Green Day

== H ==
- Hammerhead
- Hi-Standard
- Hogan's Heroes
- The Honor System
- The Hope Bombs
- Horrorpops
- Hot Snakes
- Hot Water Music

== J ==
- Janez Detd.
- The Julie Ruin
- Justin Scarred

== K ==
- Killdozer
- Klamydia
- Kronstadt Uprising

== L ==
- Lagwagon
- The Lawrence Arms
- Leningrad
- The Living End
- Longstocking
- The Loved Ones
- Lower Class Brats

== M ==
- Magnapop
- The Marked Men
- Mary Ellis
- The Matches
- Meat Puppets
- The Menzingers
- Minor Threat
- Minutemen
- The Murder City Devils
- MDC
- Melvins
- Mob 47
- Murphy's Law
- Mustard Plug
- Misfits
- Mission of Burma

== N ==
- Nailpin
- Neck
- The Need
- Negative Approach
- New Bomb Turks
- Nomeansno
- No Use for a Name
- NOFX

== O ==
- The Offspring
- One Man Army
- Operation Ivy
- Organ Thieves
- One Way System

== P ==
- Pansy Division
- Pegboy
- Pennywise
- Peter and the Test Tube Babies
- The Phantom Limbs
- Phinius Gage
- Picture Frame Seduction
- Pinhead Gunpowder
- Protein
- Pulley
- Punchline
- The Punkles
- PUP

== Q ==
- The Queers

== R ==
- Rancid
- Reagan Youth
- The Real McKenzies
- Redd Kross
- Reel Big Fish
- The Riffs
- Rich Kids on LSD
- Rise Against
- RIOT 111
- Rites of Spring
- Rollins Band
- Rudimentary Peni
- Rx Bandits

== S ==
- Samhain
- Samiam
- The Scarred
- Scaterd Few
- Scratch Acid
- Screeching Weasel
- Seaweed
- Sham 69
- She Devils
- Sheer Terror
- Sick of it All
- Sister George
- Slick Shoes
- Sloppy Seconds
- SNFU
- Social Distortion
- Soulside
- The Spermbirds
- Steve Bjorklund
- The Stitches
- Street Dogs
- Streetlight Manifesto
- Strung Out
- Subhumans (UK band)
- Suicidal Tendencies
- The Suicide Machines
- Sum 41
- Swingin' Utters

== T ==
- Tales of Terror
- Teen Idles
- Terrorgruppe
- The Scarred
- Toxic Waste
- T.S.O.L.
- Two Man Advantage
- The Templars
- The Transplants
- Total Chaos
- Toy Dolls

== V ==
- The Vandals
- The Varukers

== W ==
- Wizo
- Wrangler Brutes

== Y ==
- The Young Werewolves

== Z ==
- Zebrahead
