= The Scarred =

Garage punk band

- Origin: Anaheim, California, U.S.
- Genres: Garage punk
- Years active: 2003–2014
- Labels: Jailhouse Records, Basement Records, Punk Core Records
- Members: Justin "Scarred" Willits; Ben 9000; Matt "Monkey" Hatcher; Byron Sinn
- Past members: Isha Rose; Dan Mulvey; Andy White; Patrick Clancy; Nate Felon; Jordan Thompson
- Website: www.TheScarred.com

The Scarred is an American former garage punk band from Anaheim, California, formed in 2003, on the East Coast-based label Jailhouse Records. Formed by Samuel Clemens, they are one of the only old school punk bands active from Anaheim, and known for bridging the sound between 1970s punk rock, soul, and classic rock.

== History ==
The Scarred formed in 2003 by Justin "Scarred" Willits, Matt "Monkey" Hatcher, Isha Rose and Jordan Thompson. The three had been in bands before and quickly set to work playing live shows with such Punk Rock notables as Naked Aggression, The Adicts, Menace, Cheap Sex, The Skeptix, and more. After starting a family, Isha stepped down and was replaced by Ben 9000, drummer of other notable bands such as Rezurex and Jeffree Star.

=== Repression ===
The band recorded a demo in the back room of a radio station, and sent it out to underground fanzines, where it quickly received good reviews, including California's legendary MRR. Capitalizing on their good reviews, the band decided to record a full-length album and entered 459 Audio studios in Monrovia, California to record their debut album. In February 2004, the band finally released their first album, Repression, before heading out on their first U.S. Tour. Over the next year they toured the country relentlessly, quickly selling out the thousand copies of their debut CD and gaining some attention in the Punk media not only for their albums, but for their live show.

The quick sales of Repression led to the band entering the studio to record a split seven-inch with New Jersey punk band Void Control. It was released in early 2005, quickly earning the band more good reviews. The split-EP was also released on limited Coke bottle Green colored Vinyl, which sold out immediately and has since become difficult to find.

=== No Solution ===
In August 2005, the band was offered a record deal with a New York street-punk label. According to the band, they were thrilled to receive the offer, as they were in debt, on the verge of bankruptcy, and would have had no other option but to end the band. At the urging of the label, The Scarred quickly rushed to a rent-by-the-hour practice studio in downtown Anaheim and had a live set of three songs recorded by filmmaker Lewis Smithingham, who included it in Punk Core records' first DVD, Pure Punk Rock which was released March 7, 2006. The master copy of the DVD had been scratched over the Scarred's set, causing the audio and video on the last segments to skew. Justin would later comment that they regretted recording for the DVD at all, due to the rushed and comparatively low quality of their segment, but that they were honored to be included and featured alongside The Casualties, The Virus, and Defiance, among others. According to the Spring 2006 Edition of Loud, Fast, Rules! magazine, the band had been recording songs over the last nine months one session at a time as budget allowed. With Punk Core's help, they were able to finish the album in December 2005, at which point it was set for release in April, 2006.

After an October tour, which included both the debut of new rhythm guitar player Andy White of KTP, and also his dismissal after the tour was over, the band set out on their second Clampdown U.S. tour with friends and Los Angeles street-punk locals, Destruct. The date of their Washington, DC show was canceled due to a stabbing at the venue the previous night, but on April 4, 2006 The Scarred's second album No Solution was released in stores. The album was received with good reviews from the United States and Europe. Skratch Magazine praised its diversity in a feature in the May Issue of that year, in which, oddly, Justin hinted at his disappointment in not being able to see the album released on Cassette tape, an obsolete format. The Scarred went back on the road soon after returning from their April 2006 tour. The Scarred took two weeks off before heading out to support what would be Cheap Sex's final tour. On tour the shows did well, but was plagued by conflict within the tour that would signal the eventual breakup of Cheap Sex. The Scarred's drummer, Isha, was also pregnant the entire tour with her and husband and singer Justin Willits' first child.

=== 2007 – 2008 ===
At the end of the tour, The Scarred released cover artwork from their forthcoming record, only to cancel recording sessions after 6 songs due to fatigue and lack of funds from the label. They played only a few shows during the remainder of Isha's pregnancy, including one with Cheap Sex's drummer Gabe at the Allen Theatre. Their baby was born on March 21, 2007, and The Scarred announced via Myspace that they would be returning to work soon, starting with the third annual Clampdown Tour in June and July 2007, which would feature Brad Jamison of Vengeance 77 on the drums while Isha was still recovering. However, despite fans eagerly expecting their arrival, an accident forced The Scarred to drop off the tour the day before their departure, as Vocals/Guitar player Justin Willits broke his leg at the last practice. After several months of healing, The Scarred recruited Ben 9000 on drums, announced a fall 2007 tour, and posted several Studio Updates on YouTube.com. As fate would have it, the tour proved disastrous. Not only did several winter storms force cancellations of many of the tour's shows, but the band quickly ran out of money. After breaking down 4 weeks into a 7-week tour, the band was forced to return home. Isha returned to the drums in 2008 and the original lineup seemed poised to make a comeback and finish their delayed third album, the band learned that PunkCore records had gone inactive, leaving their album unfinished. Complicating things further, bass player Matt "Monkey" Hatcher relocated to Ferndale, Washington as the band released a limited 4-song digital EP, titled "Panic!" featuring three songs from what would have been their sophomore punkcore album, and one song with drummer Ben 9000 of Rezurex. Recruiting studio assistant Patrick Clancy (of Half past 2 and Longway) to finish out the year, The band was on hiatus with no bass player, and rumored to have broken up. At the end of the year, two songs from the Panic! EP were released as a split CD-EP with Chinese punk outfit The Noname in China, and a limited 7" in Germany.

=== At Half Mast ===
In the fall of 2008, having heard The Scarred had been sitting on an unreleased record, Los Angeles-based Basement Records owner Chuck offered to put out the band's long delayed third full-length album. Heading into the studio in March 2009, The Scarred laid down basic tracks in four days, including flying down original bass player Matt "Monkey" Hatcher for the record. Recording continued in the kitchen of Justin Scarred's Long Beach apartment for all the vocals, and the tracks were quickly mixed, mastered, and sent off to press, released in July 2009 as "At Half Mast."

At this time, drummer Isha Rose bowed out due to tendonitis as a result of injury, seeing tour drummer Ben 9000 become The Scarred's permanent drummer. The band quietly recruited Byron Sinn, who had played in Prima Donna and Destruct, to fill the void while Monkey worked on his legal issues. After filling the second half of 2009 with small club shows which received great reviews, the band recruited Nathanael Felon from Fresno, California's "The Martyrs" to fill out the lineup on rhythm guitar.

=== 2010 and on ===
With a live lineup tested and in place, in January 2010 frontman Justin Scarred surprised fans by announcing he would spend the year concentrating writing a brand new album, while the other band members take 2010 to tour with their respective bands, and Ben 9000 drums for controversial pop-figure Jeffree Star on his world tour.

In late March 2010, media sources announced that The Scarred would be playing an unknown limited number of East Coast tour dates sponsored by DNA Energy Drink with Florida punk rock band "The New Threat." As of April 15, 2010, according to the band's Myspace calendar, dates are scheduled for July 8–20, 2010.

== Permanent hiatus ==
From 2013, The Scarred are on a permanent hiatus. They completed two songs of new material when they stopped, and they have decided to stream those songs for free. Justin is still writing and recording demos, but there are currently no concrete plans for a new band. Justin has now left music behind & is now a full time creator on YouTube, making videos about Route 66, Disneyland, and other places he visits.

== Discography ==
=== Albums ===
- Repression (February 14, 2004, Shogun 77 Records)
- No Solution (April 4, 2006, Punk Core Records)
- Repression Re-Issue w/ Live and Rare tracks (2007, Bouncing Betty Records)
- At Half Mast (June 23, 2009, Basement Records)
- Live Fast Die Poor (September 23, 2011 Jailhouse Records)

=== EPs ===
- Self-Titled (October 2003, 4-song CDEP Demo, limited to 500 copies)
- Split 7 (Split Vinyl 7" with New Jersey's Void Control. 2005 Puke N Vomit Records)
- Panic! EP (Limited digital release in the United States Oct-Nov 2008)
- Split EP (Split vinyl 7" and CD-ep with China's "The Noname" released in China and Germany December 2008)
- Defiance/TheScarred (Split vinyl 7" from Jailhouse records, July 20, 2011)

=== Singles ===
- "It Ain't Easy" (October 1, 2010, limited iTunes release)
- "Randomland"

=== DVDs ===
- "Pure Punk Rock" (March 27, 2006, Punk Core Records)

=== Music Videos ===
- :Phillip Arellano" (December 12, 2011, Punk Core Records)

== See also ==
- List of musicians in the second wave of punk music
