= Career Soldiers (band) =

American punk rock band

- Origin: Southern California, U.S.
- Genres: Street punk
- Years active: 2002–2009
- Labels: Punk Core Records
- Members: Jake Loban - lead vocals Ricky - guitar, vocals Ryan - bass, vocals Tay - drums
- Past members: Derek - guitar Brian - drums
- Website: careersoldiers.com

Career Soldiers was an American street punk band based in San Diego, California, active from 2002 to 2009. The band toured the U.S. and Canada with bands like The Casualties, Lower Class Brats, Monster Squad, Clit 45, UK Subs, and Funeral Dress.

== History ==
Formed in August 2002 with Jake Loban on guitar and vocals, Ryan on bass and backup vocals, and Brian on drums and backup vocals, the band recorded a demo and in November played their first shows with Thought Riot and Toxic Narcotic. They later decided to add a guitarist so Loban could focus only on vocals.

In March 2003, the band recorded the Passion for Destruction EP. In late 2003, they recorded their debut full-length album titled Finding Freedom in Hopelessness, released in September 2004 by ADD Records.

In August 2005, the band toured nationally with Cheap Sex and The Havoc, followed by a tour with The Unseen and A Global Threat. In early 2006, the band booked a six-week tour through the U.S. and Canada with Clit 45. In the same year, they finished writing new material which would later become the album Loss of Words, released by Punk Core Records in 2007.

In December 2008, the band announced on their website that they had officially broken up due to financial strain and band members living in different cities.

== Discography ==
- Loss of Words (2007, Punk Core Records)
- Finding Freedom in Hopelessness (2004, ADD Records)
- Passion for Destruction (2003, self-released)
