= Defiance (punk band) =

American anarcho street punk band

- Origin: Portland, Oregon, U.S.
- Genres: Street punk Hardcore punk Anarcho-punk
- Years active: 1993–present
- Label: Punk Core Records
- Members: Mike Arrogant - guitar, vocals Matts Brainard - bass, backing vocals Eric "Niff" Alukonis - drums
- Past members: Tony - vocals Kelly Halliburton - bass Chris Carey - bass Alan - bass Kyle "Saigon Shakes" House - bass Mark - guitar Corey - guitar Brian Payne - drums Alaric "Gibby" Brown - vocals

Defiance are an American anarcho street punk band from Portland, Oregon, formed in 1993. Their discography includes five EPs, four albums, and one album of out of print and rare songs. They have been cited as major influences on bands such as Anti-Flag and The Unseen.

== History ==
In the winter of 1993, members from the bands Deprived, Unamused and Resist formed the first line-up of Defiance, with Tony Mengis and Alaric Brown on vocals, Mike Arroant on guitar and vocals, Kelly Halliburton on bass and Eric Alukonis on drums. Shortly after, the band entered the studio to record what would later become the first two EPs: Defiance and Burn, both released on Consensus Reality, label property of Kelly, bassist of the band. After releasing the self-titled the band did a U.S. tour. Shortly after the tour ended Tony left the band, so Mike and Alaric shared vocal duties for the Burn EP.

After the release of the Burn EP the band went to make a short tour in Canada and the U.S. In the fall of 1995 the band did an east coast tour with The Final Warning, The Casualties and The Varukers, later, they went to make a European tour, on which they released their third EP: European Tour 1995, limited to approximately 1000 copies sold at the shows. After touring 19 countries through two and a half months the band went to inactivity until the first LP No Future No Hope was released in early 1996, being released in the U.S. by Mind Control and by the German label Skuld Releases in Europe.

After the European tour Kelly left the band, being replaced with Chris, so the fourth EP was released under the title No Time, followed by an East Coast tour in 1997. When Defiance returned to Portland, Matt (former The Obliterated) was recruited as second guitarist, and after a short tour with The Riffs the second LP Nothing Lasts Forever was released. Following this release Alaric, Eric and Chris decide to leave the band. Consequently, the band went on a long hiatus.

It was not until late 2000 that Mike and Matt decided to get together and began to write new material, and after the addition of Brian on drums, Matt recruited Alan on bass from a Portland band called Treason and respectively a tour in Mexico was booked. With the new line-up, Defiance recorded the third album, Out of the Ashes, released on Punk Core Records. Along with a U.S. tour alongside A Global Threat, Clit 45, and The Riffs, the band made an appearance in the Holidays In The Sun festival 2002 in New Jersey.

Back in Portland the band recorded what would later become the fifth EP, entitled Against the Law, released in the fall of 2003 through the French label Dirty Punk Records. As the record was finished, the band toured alongside Icons of Filth and Clit 45 on the U.S. West Coast. In June 2003 Defiance was set to get back to the UK for the first time in eight years, unfortunately, bassist Alan was denied a passport, so Kyle from The Riffs would then fill in for the tour. In September of that year A Decade of Defiance was released on Punk Core records celebrating the tenth anniversary of the band, the album contained all the previous singles released by the band.

In the next months, bassist Alan decided to leave the band. By this time, the first two LPs were re-issued on Punk Core Records. Kyle joined the band this time as the full-time bassist, so the band made a tour with Lower Class Brats in December with sold-out venues. On 2004 the band released Rise or Fall, touring with The Unseen to support the release. In 2005 the band shared the Rise or Fall Tour with the Canadian band Action, Matt parted ways the band and was replaced with Mark from Action. In January and February 2006 the band returned to Europe playing venues in countries like Germany, France and the UK, also taking part in the Punk & Disorderly Festival, with bands including Sham 69, Conflict, 999, The Partisans, SS-Kaliert and The Analogs. After 10 years, the original bass player, Kelly, returned to the band, while Corey, from a Portland band named Bloodspit Nights, briefly replaced Mark, until Brian Hopper took the second guitar place.

In June 2008, the band toured Japan, visiting cities like Tokyo, Nagoya, Osaka and Sapporo, with bands such as Tom and Bootboys, Extinct Government, D.S.B. (Defiance of Shit Bastards), Futureless System among others.

The band began work on a new album in 2008 that was finished in February 2010 and released on the label Unrest Records the following year.

== Discography ==
=== Albums ===
- No Future No Hope (1996) (Mind Control Record / Skuld Releases)
- Nothing Lasts Forever (2000) (Mind Control Records)
- Out of the Ashes (2002) (Punk Core Records)
- A Decade of Defiance: Complete Singles Collection (2003) (Punk Core Records)
- Rise or Fall (2004) (Punk Core Records)
- Very Best Of, And We Don't Care (2008) (HG Fact Records-Japan)
- Out of Order (2011) (Unrest Records)

=== EPs ===
- Defiance (1994) (Consensus Reality)
- Burn (1995) (Consensus Reality)
- European Tour 1995 (1995) (Consensus Reality)
- No Time (1997) (Profane Existence)
- Against the Law (2003) (Dirty Punk Records)
