= The Early Years: 1990–1995 =

Compilation album by The Casualties
- Released: 2001
- Recorded: 1990–1995
- Genre: Street punk

The Casualties chronology
Die Hards (2001)	The Early Years: 1990–1995 (2001)	On the Front Line (2004)

The Early Years: 1990–1995 is a compilation album by The Casualties, released in 2001.

== Track listing ==
1. Political Sin - 01:48
2. Destruction and Hate - 02:42
3. Ugly Bastards - 01:59
4. Bored and Glued - 01:40
5. Punk Rock Love - 02:00
6. 40oz Casualties - 01:45
7. Oi! Song - 01:29
8. 25 Years Too Late - 01:50
9. For the Punx - 02:43
10. Drinking is Our Way of Life - 02:29
11. Kill the Hippies - 01:30
12. No Life - 02:20
13. Two Faced - 01:56
14. Politicians - 02:16
15. Casualties - 01:44
16. Two Faced - 01:51
17. Fuck You All - 02:38

=== Bonus tracks ===
1. On the Streets (live) - 02:42
2. Ugly Bastards (live) - 02:02
3. Blind Following (live) - 01:18
4. Washed Up (live) - 02:01
5. Don't Tell the Truth (live) - 01:19
6. Oi! Song (live) - 01:39
7. 40oz Casualty (live) - 02:02
8. Rock and Roll Kids (live) - 01:28
9. Destruction and Hate (live) - 02:52
10. Punk Rock Love (live) - 01:58
