= Nowhere to Hide (album) =

Studio album by The Virus
- Released: May 28, 2002
- Genre: Street punk
- Length: 27:09
- Label: Punk Core

The Virus chronology
| Singles and Rarities (2001) | Nowhere to Hide (2002) | Benefits of War (2003) |

Professional ratings
Review scores
| Source | Rating |
|---|---|
| AllMusic | 2/5 stars |

Nowhere to Hide is the second and last studio album released by Philadelphia street punk band The Virus It was released in 2002 on Punk Core Records.

== Track list ==
| No. | Title | Length |
|---|---|---|
| 1. | "Another Day Goes By" | 1:37 |
| 2. | "So Long" | 2:10 |
| 3. | "Heroes" | 2:58 |
| 4. | "Very Last Day" | 2:04 |
| 5. | "Nowhere to Hide" | 1:10 |
| 6. | "Terror" | 1:51 |
| 7. | "Rats in the City" | 4:03 |
| 8. | "Vicious Rumors" | 2:02 |
| 9. | "No One Can Save You" | 2:28 |
| 10. | "Working for the Company" | 2:06 |
| 11. | "Already Dead" | 2:10 |
| 12. | "My Life, My World" | 2:30 |
