= SOS Records =

- Industry: Music
- Headquarters: California, United States
- Website: sosrecords.us

SOS Records is a California-based punk-rock record label. The label was founded by Rob Chaos of Total Chaos and Ezzat Soliman.

== Bands ==
- 4 Past Midnight
- Abrasive Wheels
- The Adicts
- Adolescents
- The Agitators
- Antidote
- Bad Manners
- Bang Sugar Bang
- Blitz
- Broken Bones
- Conflict
- DBD
- The Diffs
- Drongos for Europe
- The Exploited
- Final Conflict
- Funeral Dress
- GBH
- The Ghouls
- Goldblade
- The Lurkers
- Mike Blanx and the SDABS
- Naked Aggression
- Phantom Rockers
- Red Alert
- Resilience
- Resistant Culture
- Resist And Exist
- Ryan Mudd and the Stuff
- Sham 69
- Sick56
- Sick on the Bus
- So Unloved
- Speak for the Dead
- State of Revolution
- Total Chaos
- Toy Dolls
- Varukers
- The Vibrators
- Vice Squad
