= SS-Kaliert =

German street punk band

- Origin: Ruhrpott, Germany
- Genres: Street Punk; Hardcore punk
- Years active: 2003 - Present
- Members: Torsten - Vocals; Benni - Guitar, Vocals; A.G. - Guitar; Moritz - Bass; Fab - Drums
- Past members: Chris - Bass; Nils - Bass; Flo - Guitar; Olli - Guitar
- Website: Official Website

SS-Kaliert are a German hardcore street punk band, they had been mistaken as a Neo Nazi group as the name has the "SS" as in the Nazi SS. Originally, the band name was "Es Eskaliert" which means “it escalates”, the band decided to replace it with the actual SS-Kaliert name because it was more eye-attractive as a logo.

Every time you turn on the TV, or look in the newspaper, you see things that should not be… something has to be done! For example… politicians [raising] taxes while companies lower the wages – this shows how the world splits more and more into two classes.

— Benni

== History ==
Formed in 2003, with Torsten on vocals, Benni on guitar and vocals, Chris on bass and Fab on drums, it's until 2004 that the band record their demo tape titled “A.C.A.B. Demo Tape”. After some shows, Nils joined the band and the vocalist Wolfgang Wendland from the band Die Kassierer helped the band by pressing their debut 7” Stand Up and Fight, from this point, the band started to create themselves a name and a reputation, playing shows on Europe and having a second pressing of the debut EP. In April 2005, Flo is added as a second guitarist, some shows are booked plus participations on the Punk And Disorderly Festival and Endless Summer Festival.

2006 sees the release of the Self Titled EP on FNS Records form Boston on January, also the band tour on Brandenburg, Mecklenburg-Vorpommern, Saarland, Bayern, Berlin and Austria with bands such as Lower Class Brats, Defiance, Pestpocken, Emscherkurve 77, Hellratz, Action, Xcrosscheckx, Damage Case, Krum Bums, Abrasive Wheels, Mouth Sewn Shut among others. In June, DSKlation, the band's first LP is released through Punk Core Records, on September, the album is released on AMP Records, label managed by Benni and Nils, the picture disc LP features the original eleven tracks plus 4 live. In September Flo left the band.

In 2007, Olli join the band as guitarist for a couple of months, being replaced by A. G. in August. The band keeps playing shows with bands like Leftöver Crack, The Business and Conflict, also joins Total Chaos for a Europe tour and Monster Squad for a U.S. west coast tour. On may, the SS-Kaliert / Mouth Sewn Shut Split is released through Razorblade Music and Drinking Class Records.

Released on May 13, 2008, Addiction is the second album from the band, released by Razorbalde Music (CD) and Maniac Attack Records (LP) in Europe, also, pressed as a digipak in the U.S. by Rodent Popsicle Records. The album contains 12 tracks, following the street punk style as the previously released material, to support the release the band booked the International Chaos Tour, beginning in October. On June 24, 2010 the band signs with People Like You Records and later that year they announce that their new album would be released in 2011. On 28 April 2011 the band announced that bass player Nils had left the band for personal problems. On 30 May of the same year Moritz became the new bass player for the band. In 2011 the band released their third studio album Subzero.

== Discography ==
=== LPs ===
- DSKlation (2006) (Punk Core Records)
- Addiction (2008) (Razorblade Music/Rodent Popsicle Records)
- SubZero (2011) (People Like You Records)

=== EPs ===
- A.C.A.B. Demo Tape (2004)
- Stand Up And Fight (2004) (D´acord Goldklang Records)
- Self Titled (2006) (FNS Records)
- SS-Kaliert / Mouth Sewn Shut Split (2007) (Drinking Class Records)
- SS-Kaliert / Futureless System Split (2008) (E.A.S.T. Peace Records)
