= On the Front Line =

On the Front Line may refer to:

- On the Front Line (The Casualties album), 2004
- On the Front Line (Dan Seals album), 1986
