= Clit 45 =

American punk rock band

- Origin: Long Beach, California, United States
- Genres: Street punk, hardcore punk
- Years active: 1996–2006, 2011, 2015, 2016, 2019, 2025
- Labels: BYO Records, PunkCore Records, ADD Records, [Riot Squad Records]
- Website: c45anticrew.com

Clit 45 was an American punk rock band from Long Beach, California, United States, that formed in 1996. The band played traditional, fast punk, influenced by the Adolescents, Poison Idea and Bad Religion. Their second and third albums were published by BYO Records and distributed by Cargo Records in Europe. They toured with the Casualties, the Briefs, New Mexican Disaster Squad, Complete Control, the Riffs, the Krays, Defiance, Dropkick Murphys, the Virus, the Unseen, Bad Religion, and A Global Threat. Their last show was in Portland, OR in October 2006. After a yearlong hiatus, Clit 45 announced that they had officially disbanded on Christmas Day, 2007 via their MySpace page.

Following their disbandment, Clit 45 played a handful of live shows between 2011, 2019, and 2025.

Lead Singer Dave is now playing in a punk rock band called The Fiends! and recently in a deathrock band called BEFORE DAWN.

== Members ==
- Vocals - Dave
- Guitar - Mike
- Bass - Rufio
- Guitar - Rico

== Discography ==
Albums

- 2000: Tales from the Clit (ADD Records)
- 2005: Self-Hate Crimes (BYO Records)
- 2006: 2, 4, 6, 8... We're the Kids You Love to Hate (BYO Records)

EPs

- 1996: Demo
- 1998: Broken Glass (Riot Squad)
- 1999: Straight Outta Long Beach (ADD Records)
- 2002: Your Life To Choose (Punkcore Records)
- 2003: Kids Aren't Alright (Ghetto Blast)
