= Stay Out =

Stay Out may refer to:

- "Stay Out", a song by Nina Nesbitt from Peroxide
- "Get out and Stay Out", a song by The Who from Quadrophenia
- Stay Out of the Basement, the second book in the Goosebumps original series
- "Stay Out of My Life", a song by Five Star from Silk & Steel
- Dino: Stay Out!, 1995 short film
- Stay Out of Order, an album by The Casualties
- Stay Out of the South, a 1927 composition by Harold Dixon
