= Stay Out of Order =

Stay Out Of Order

Studio album by The Casualties
- Released: July 18, 2000
- Recorded: March 2000
- Genre: Street punk
- Length: 31:50
- Label: Punk Core Records

The Casualties chronology
Underground Army (1998)	Stay Out Of Order (2000)	Die Hards (2001)

Professional ratings
Review scores
Source	Rating
Allmusic	2/5 stars

Stay Out of Order is the third album by street punk band The Casualties. It was released in 2000.

== Track listing ==
1. No Way Out
2. Proud to Be Punk
3. Street Punk
4. Fight for Your Life
5. Time to Think
6. Violence
7. Same Fucking Song
8. Just Another Lie
9. Authority Is Dead
10. Preachers
11. Way of Life
12. Society's Fodder (Riot Squad Cover)
13. Hidden Track (starts at time 6:14 on last track): Dead Cities (The Exploited cover)
