= Career Soldiers =

Career Soldiers may refer to:

- Career Soldiers (band), a street punk / hardcore punk band from Southern California
- Standing army, an army composed of full-time professional soldiers who do not disband during times of peace
