= Resistance (The Casualties album) =

Studio album by The Casualties
- Released: September 25, 2012
- Genre: Hardcore punk, street punk
- Length: 36:00
- Label: Season of Mist
- Producer: Chris "Zeuss" Harris

The Casualties chronology
We Are All We Have (2009)	Resistance (2012)	Chaos Sound (2016)

Professional ratings
Review scores
Source	Rating
AbsolutePunk	(74%)
MetalUnderground	4/5 stars

Resistance is the ninth studio album by New York street punk band The Casualties. It was released on September 25, 2012 on Season of Mist.

== Track listing ==
No.	Title	Length
1.	"My Blood, My Life, Always Forward"	2:09
2.	"Behind Barbed Wire"	1:45
3.	"Resistance"	2:16
4.	"Modern Day Slaves"	2:21
5.	"Warriors on the Road"	2:34
6.	"South East Asian Rebels"	2:02
7.	"Morality Police"	2:31
8.	"Brick Wall Justice"	1:55
9.	"Always Walk Alone"	2:32
10.	"Constant Struggle"	1:52
11.	"It's Coming Down on You"	2:19
12.	"Life On the Line"	1:50
13.	"No Hope"	2:03
14.	"Corazones Intoxicados"	4:56
15.	"Soul of Fire (bonus track)"
16.	"Voice of the Outcast"	2:55
