= Halfway to Hell (disambiguation) =

"Halfway to Hell" is a 2023 song by Jelly Roll.

Halfway to Hell may also refer to:

== Music ==
- 333: Halfway to Hell, a 2009 album by the 3tards
- Halfway to Hell, a 2010 EP by the band Hypnos

=== Songs ===
- "Halfway to Hell", a 2011 song by The Go Set
- "Halfway to Hell", a 2014 song by Sheppard on the album Bombs Away
- "Halfway to Hell", a 2016 song by The Casualties on the album Chaos Sound
- "Half Way to Hell", a 2016 song by Raging Speedhorn on the album Lost Ritual

== Literature ==
- Halfway to Hell, a 1934 short story by John Collier, collected in the 1951 anthology Fancies and Goodnights
- Halfway to Hell, a 1954 short story by Jerome Bixby
- Halfway to Hell, a 1959 novel by Harry Whittington (author)
- Halfway to Hell, a 1964 novel by Giles A. Lutz

== Other uses ==
- Half Way to Hell, a 1960 (or 1961) film co-directed by Victor Adamson and Al Adamson
- Half Way to Hell, a 2013 film whose soundtrack features Mayuka Thaïs
- Half Way to Hell Club, a club of men who fell from the Golden Gate Bridge during its construction in 1936 and 1937 and were saved by the safety nets
