= Nothing Lasts Forever (Defiance album) =

Studio album by Defiance
- Released: 1998
- Recorded: June 13, 1999
- Genre: Street punk, anarcho-punk
- Length: 28:27
- Label: Mind Control
- Producer: Mike Lastra

Defiance chronology
No Time (1997)	Nothing Lasts Forever (1998)	Out of the Ashes (2002)

Professional ratings
Review scores
Source	Rating
AllMusic	3/5 stars

Nothing Lasts Forever is an album by the American anarcho street punk band Defiance. It was released on Mind Control Records in 1998.

== Critical reception ==
AllMusic wrote that "the last album by the original lineup of Defiance before an extended hiatus, Nothing Lasts Forever has a dispirited, defeatist tone—even more so than usual for this brand of metal-tinged post-hardcore punk—in both the album title and songs like the sneering 'Kill the Bastards' and the churning thrash of 'It's Never Gonna Change'."

== Track listing ==
1. Nowhere - 3:16
2. Don't Want It - 2:48
3. Dead and Gone - 3:41
4. Cheers - 2:46
5. Nothing Worth Dying For - 2:59
6. It's Never Gonna Change - 2:58
7. Kill the Bastards - 2:48
8. You Don't Know - 2:36
9. Emergency - 2:38 (Motörhead cover)
10. Nothing Lasts Forever - 2:08
