= En la Línea del Frente =

Studio album by The Casualties
- Released: 2005
- Genre: Street punk
- Length: 34:48
- Label: SideOneDummy

The Casualties chronology
On the Front Line (2004)	En la Línea del Frente (2005)	Under Attack (2006)

En la Línea del Frente (Spanish: on the front line) is the sixth studio album by street punk band The Casualties, and is a Spanish remake of the predecessor "On the Front Line", the mother tongue of vocalist Jorge.

Mac McCarthy of The Hard Times wrote: "En la Linea del Frente is faithful to the sound and pacing of the original English language album in a way that only Shakira had successfully pulled off before this."

== Track listing ==
1. Casualties Armada - 1:16
2. Botas - 2:23
3. Jefes - 2:32
4. Clase Criminal - 3:15
5. Futuro Destruido - 2:50
6. Soldado - 3:05
7. Vida Perdida - 2:13
8. (Punk) Música del Pueblo - 2:27
9. Control de la Prensa - 2:13
10. Guerra y Odio - 2:15
11. Tragedia del Amor - 3:00
12. Cerebro Lavado - 2:16
13. Rebelde de Oi! Día - 2:29
14. Sonidos de Mi Barrio - 2:34
