= Gundog (band) =

- Origin: London, England, United Kingdom
- Genres: Rock; Oi! Street punk
- Labels: New Blood Records; Sidekicks Records

Gundog is a British Oi! and street punk band from London.

In 1998, their debut album, They Who Laugh Last..., was released on LP by British New Blood Records and on compact disc on Swedish label Sidekicks Records.

== Discography ==
Albums

- Gundog (Cass) (1997) (self-released)
- They Who Laugh Last... (1998)
- A Dog's Eye View (2000)
