= We Are All We Have =

Studio album by The Casualties
- Released: August 25, 2009
- Genre: Street punk, crossover thrash, dub
- Length: 40:28
- Label: SideOneDummy
- Producer: Bill Stevenson

The Casualties chronology
Made in N.Y.C. (2007)	We Are All We Have (2009)	Resistance (2012)

We Are All We Have is the eighth full-length studio album from American street punk band The Casualties, on the record label SideOneDummy Records. The band started a headlining tour in support of the album on August 20, 2009.

It is released on CD and LP.

== Track listing ==
1. "Carry on the Flag" - 1:06
2. "We Are All We Have" - 3:05
3. "Heart Bleeds Black" - 2:20
4. "Rise and Fall" - 2:23
5. "Apocalypse Today" - 2:18
6. "War is Business" - 1:47
7. "In the Tombs" - 4:25
8. "Stand Against Them All" - 2:24
9. "Depression - Unemployment Lines" - 3:06
10. "Looking Thru Bloodshot Eyes" - 2:47
11. "Lonely on the Streets - Jersey City" - 3:01
12. "Life Clone" - 1:56
13. "Clockwork" - 1:48
14. "Rockers' Reggae (Working Man's Dub)" - 8:06
