= The New Seditionaries =

The New Seditionaires

Studio album by Lower Class Brats
- Released: September 5, 2006
- Genre: Punk rock
- Label: TKO Records

Lower Class Brats chronology
A Class of Our Own (2003)	The New Seditionaires (2006)	Rock 'N' Roll Street Noize (2012)

Professional ratings
Review scores
Source	Rating
AllMusic	2/5 stars
PunkNews	3.5/5 stars

The New Seditionaires is the fourth studio album released by American punk band Lower Class Brats. It was released in 2006 on TKO Records.

== Track list ==
No.	Title	Length
1.	"Go Insane"	1:50
2.	"New Seditionaries"	2:36
3.	"P.G.L."	2:13
4.	"I'm a Mess"	2:50
5.	"Don't Care About Me"	2:39
6.	"Lip Music"	2:35
7.	"See You Go"	2:06
8.	"Fools"	2:29
9.	"The Worst"	2:52
10.	"Cat's Clause"	2:29
11.	"Beware"	2:44
12.	"Two in the Heart"	2:28
13.	"Walking Into the Fire"	2:44
