= The Virus (band) =

American punk band

- Origin: Philadelphia, Pennsylvania, U.S.
- Genres: Street punk
- Years active: 1998–2004, 2013-present
- Labels: Charged, Punkcore
- Members: Paul Sorrels; Fat Dave; Josh Howard; Zach Kolodziejski; Tyler Capone
- Past members: Mike Virus; Mike Authority; Chris Expulsion; Jarrod; Geoff; Tim; Mark Liberty; Drew; Jasper; Black Jon

The Virus is an American street punk band from Philadelphia that formed in 1998. Reformed in 2013, the current lineup includes Paul Sorrels on vocals, Zach Kolodziejski on lead guitar, Fat Dave on rhythm guitar, Josh Howard on bass, and Tyler Capone on drums. The Virus is actively playing shows and booking tours.

== History ==
The Virus formed in February 1998, with Mike Virus on vocals, Chris on lead guitar, Fat Dave on guitar, Jarrod on drums, and Geoff on bass. The band played their first show a month later. During the band's first six months, they performed several concerts, including one in Philadelphia with the band Special Duties, and another at the now-closed Coney Island High in New York City.

In July 1998, they recorded two songs for a split CD with New York band The Manix (with members of The Devotchkas and The Casualties). Only 130 copies of the CD were made, and they sold out quickly. Shortly thereafter, original bass player Geoff was asked to leave the band. After trying out several bass players, it was decided that Fat Dave's longtime friend Paul would join.

In February 1999, the band recorded five songs for their first 7", called Global Crisis, and for the Punx Unite 2 compilation on Charged Records. The 7" sold out fairly quickly, and they started getting a lot more gig offers. In May, lead guitar player Chris and the band had a falling out, with Chris leaving the band. The band continued to perform regularly all over the east coast United States as a quartet.

In September, the band added a new member, Mike Authority of local Philadelphia band, No Authority. In March 2000, the band recorded 12 songs for their first full-length CD/LP, Still Fighting For A Future, on Charged Records. After the album was recorded, singer Mike Virus left the band and Paul took over vocals. The band then recruited Tim from the Jersey band The Oi! Scouts.

In June, the band left for a six-week US tour with The Casualties, Endless Struggle, Antidote and Funeral Dress. After returning from the tour, Tim informed the band that the road life wasn't for him, but he agreed to help out until the band replaced him. In December the band brought in Josh, who played in Central PA punk bands The Scarred and TMI Generation. In March 2001, the band recorded four new songs for a limited picture disc 7" to be released on Charged Records. Punk Core Records bought the rights to release the picture disc from Charged Records, and released the 7" in October 2001, along with a Singles & Rarities CD .

In June 2000, the band played the Promote Chaos festival in Atlanta, Georgia alongside bands like: Anti-Nowhere League, The Crack, and Peter and the Test Tube Babies. A month later they went to Morecambe, England to play at the Holidays In The Sun festival alongside bands like The Exploited, The Partisans, Charged GBH, U.K. Subs, Resistance 77, Threats and Cock Sparrer.

Late August saw the band on a short East Coast US tour with Antidote from the Netherlands. After the tour, the band took five months off to write and record their second 12-song CD/LP titled Nowhere To Hide on Punk Core Records. During those five months, Fat Dave left the band. In February 2002, the band recorded their second full-length album. Drew joined the band on bass, and Josh moved to guitar On February 15, the band played in Philadelphia with Slaughter & The Dogs.

After that, they were back to playing regular weekend gigs all over the American east coast. In April, the Nowhere To Hide CD & LP was released. In July, the band again played at the Holidays In The Sun festival in England. They then went on a short west coast US tour with The Riffs from Portland. Then the band played the HITS fest in Asbury Park, New Jersey in early September. A highlight of the festival for the band was having Wattie Buchan of the Exploited join the band onstage to sing The Exploited song I Believe In Anarchy. The band returned to California at the end of the year to play three concerts in Hollywood, Pomona and San Diego with the Riffs & The Voids.

In January 2003, the band went into the studio to record 7 songs. Four of those 7 songs were for the ‘Benefits Of War’ 7" released on Dirty Punk Records, and the remaining 3 songs were demos that remain unreleased as of now. On Feb 14, the band played its 5-year anniversary show in Philadelphia with guest vocalist Mike Virus from the band's original line-up. In May, the band saw another line-up change with the departure of the band's second vocalist, Paul. At this time the band had already had a 10-week tour planned and many of the dates were already booked. Faced with the choices of either throwing in the towel or continuing forward with a different singer, the band chose to go forward. So the band acquired its third vocalist, Jasper, from the Boston, MA. band, The Vigilantes. For the next month the band practiced continually to prepare the new singer. Then from the beginning of July until mid September, the band toured the US and Canada with longtime New Jersey hardcore-punk band, Blind Society. This was the first time The Virus had played any shows in Canada. After the tour, the band went to Puerto Rico for one show in Puerto Rico. That October Josh left the band.

February 2004, the Virus went on a six-week US tour with the Unseen. Halfway through, Jarrod left the band and was replaced by, Black Jon, ex-drummer of Void Control and Blind Society. In April the band traveled to Cleveland to record at Ryan Foltz's (Dropkick Murphy's) studio. It was never released.

Summer of 2004, The Destruction and Debauchery Tour with Clit 45 and Complete Control lasted 10 weeks. The Virus suffered a major van accident on the highway between Boise and Salt Lake City. The van flipped 3 times, seriously injuring the drummer Black Jon. Some tour dates in Canada were canceled but the tour resumed shortly after.

September 2004, The Virus disbanded. Dave went on to play in bands such as the Tight Fits! and Nighttime Dealers, which Paul later joined. Paul and Josh also formed the band Kamikaze Zero. Paul now owns 717 Tattoo which is located outside of Harrisburg. Jasper went on to form the post-punk band The Hunt (NY). Josh has played in The Lookies, and The Line. Black Jon continued touring and recording with Clit 45, Void Control, Guilty Faces and Bucket Flush. Mike Virus formed the band Cheap Sex and later formed the band Evacuate.

In spring of 2013, The Virus became active again garnering attention on Facebook. A free show was then announced for May. The Virus then played two official reunion shows in Connecticut and Philadelphia in early August. In November the band toured the east coast. No Tour Can Be Won covered 13 cities in 13 days, and fan support was strong.

April 2014, The Virus toured the west coast with Bad Engrish (Denver) and Evacuate (San Diego). This was an eight show tour from Seattle, WA to Tijuana, Mexico. Support was strong and the overall agreement was that THIS WAS AWESOME. In June there were two shows with Boston's Who Killed Spikey Jacket?

July 2014, The Virus headlined the FYWROK punk rock festival. Two one-off shows were booked on the way out to Tulsa with the band playing under the name “Full Circle”, which featured 4 of the 5 Virus members. In October 2014 The Virus headlined the Northeast Upstart Fest, a 10 city touring festival.

Following the end of the Upstart Fest, Mike Authority announced he would be leaving the band. Long-time friend and roadie Zach took the job of lead guitar. Several shows were booked for the end of March 2015 with Who Killed Spikey Jacket?, The Bad Engrish, and Ravagers. A Europe/Russia tour was announced for Spring 2015. The Virus was invited back to FYWROK in 2015 and a small Midwest tour was planned for mid-summer around the fest.

The Midwest tour went well, with tons of support at every show. A little bit after the tour ended, it was decided that the band would start looking for a new drummer. The band posted a want-ad for a drummer, and was inundated with people wanting to try out. They tried out a few people, and ended up going with Tyler Capone from Chicago. The band played their first show with the new lineup in Philadelphia in April, direct-supporting Peter and the Test-Tube Babies. Well-received, they decided to keep going.

The band had already been working on their new full-length, but once the new lineup was complete, writing took precedent over everything. The guys got together every two weeks for 5 months before going into the studio. The band went into MDW Productions Studio in late April 2016 to start recording their new full-length, "System Failure". After a few sessions in the studio, the record was done and the band could focus on playing some shows.

In June 2016, The Virus headlined a Punk Rock Bowling club show in Asbury Park, NJ, with Pears as direct support. In September, the band went to LA and played a sold-out show at The Observatory with Corrupted Youth, The P.I.N.s, and Tanzler. The rest of the year held some more shows around the east coast and Midwest, playing Syracuse, NY with WKSJ?, and Chicago with The Casualties, among others.

System Failure was released on February 14, 2017, and the band has been working hard with their labels, Voltage Records in Europe and Evacuate Records in the US, to get the record out to all the people who want to hear it. The Virus had a tour planned for March 2017 in the Southwestern United States.

== Discography ==
- Global Crisis 7" - 1999 on Charged Records
- Still Fighting for a Future - released 2000 on Charged Records
- Singles and Rarities - released 2001 on Punkcore Records
- Nowhere to Hide - released 2002 on Punkcore Records
- Benefits of War 7" - 2003 on Dirty Punk Records
- System Failure - released 2017

== Members ==
- Paul Sorrels - Bass, Vocals (Nov 1998 - May 2003) + (May 2013 - Current)
- Josh Howard - Bass, Rhythm guitar (Dec 2000 - Oct 2003) + (May 2013 - Current)
- Fat Dave - Rhythm Guitar (Feb 1998 - Feb 2002) + (May 2013 - Current)
- Zach Kolodziejski - Lead guitar (Nov 2014 - current)
- Tyler Capone - Drums (Nov 2015 - Current)
- Mike Authority - Lead guitar (Sep 1999 - Sep 2004) + (May 2013 - Nov 2014)
- Drew - Bass (Feb 2002 - Sept 2004)
- Jasper - Vocals (May 2003 - Sep 2004)
- Jarrod - Drums (Feb 1998 - Feb 2004)
- Black Jon - Drums (Feb 2004 - Sep 2004) + (May 2013 - Sept 2015)
- Mike Virus - Vocals (Feb 1998 - Mar 2000)
- Chris Expulsion - Lead Guitar (Feb 1998 - May 1999)
- Geoff - Bass (Feb 1998 - Aug 1998)
- Mark Liberty - Bass (Aug 1998 - Nov 1998)
- Tim - Bass (Mar 2000 - Dec 2000)
