= Die Hards =

Studio album by The Casualties
- Released: August 21, 2001
- Genre: Street punk
- Length: 31:06
- Label: SideOneDummy

The Casualties chronology
Stay Out of Order (2000)	Die Hards (2001)	The Early Years: 1990–1995 (2001)

Professional ratings
Review scores
Source	Rating
AllMusic	3/5 stars

Die Hards is the fourth album by the hardcore punk rock band The Casualties. It was released in 2001.

"Get Off My Back" is used in the video game Tony Hawk's American Wasteland.

== Critical reception ==
In a positive review, Exclaim! wrote that the album "may be short on originality but it makes up for it in 'boots to the head' attitude." Maximum Rocknroll called it "more speedy snotty ... hardcore punk with lots of chanted choruses from all [the band's] mates."

== Track listing ==
1. "Nightmare" - 2:58
2. "City Council" - 2:05
3. "Ruining It All" - 1:26
4. "Get Off My Back" - 2:17
5. "Victims" - 2:58
6. "This Is Your Life" - 2:25
7. "Die Hards" - 2:34
8. "No Turning Back" - 2:18
9. "Can't Stop Us" - 2:43
10. "Mierda Mundial" - 2:34
11. "Punk Rock" - 2:01
12. "Divide and Conquer" - 2:22
13. "Made In N.Y.C." - 2:25
