= Under Attack (The Casualties album) =

Studio album by The Casualties
- Released: August 22, 2006
- Genre: Hardcore punk, Street punk
- Length: 29:59
- Label: SideOneDummy

The Casualties chronology
En la Línea del Frente (2005)	Under Attack (2006)	Made in N.Y.C. (2007)

Professional ratings
Review scores
Source	Rating
AllMusic	4/5 stars

Under Attack is the seventh album by hardcore punk band The Casualties on the record label Side One Dummy Records.

This album entered the Billboard 200 album charts at number 200. Total sales for its first week were 6,023 units.

The words of the tattoos on the hands of the person on the front cover (Johnny Ruin) say "Reje" and "Cted" spelling "REJECTED".

== Track listing ==
No.	Title	Length
1.	"Under Attack"	2:06
2.	"Without Warning"	2:20
3.	"System Failed Us... Again"	2:43
4.	"Social Outcast"	2:14
5.	"V.I.P."	3:10
6.	"No Solution - No Control"	1:41
7.	"Down & Out"	3:43
8.	"In It for Life"	2:01
9.	"On City Streets"	4:21
10.	"Fallen Heroes"	1:59
11.	"The Great American Progress"	1:59
12.	"Stand and Fight"	1:42
Total length:		29:59

The title track of this album is featured on the 2006 Vans Warped Tour compilation.

== Charts ==
Chart (2006)	Peak position
The Billboard 200	200
