= Chaos Sound =

Studio album by The Casualties
- Released: January 22, 2016
- Recorded: Orange, California, at Buzzbomb Studio
- Genre: Street punk
- Length: 32:55
- Label: Season of Mist SOM 368
- Producer: Paul Miner

The Casualties chronology
Resistance (2012)	Chaos Sound (2016)

Professional ratings
Review scores
Source	Rating
PunkNews	4/5 stars

Chaos Sound is the tenth studio album by the American street punk band The Casualties. It was released in January 2016 on Season of Mist Records. The album was also the final album to feature the last of original member Jorge Herrera on Vocals.

== Track list ==
No.	Title	Length
1.	"Intro"	0:39
2.	"Chaos Sound"	2:34
3.	"Visions of Greed"	2:37
4.	"Running Through the Night"	2:48
5.	"Brothers and Sisters"	2:54
6.	"Murder Us All"	2:21
7.	"Work Our Lives Away"	2:56
8.	"Countdown to Tomorrow"	2:28
9.	"Fight For What's Mine"	2:11
10.	"Keep Your Distance"	1:56
11.	"In the Lost City"	3:10
12.	"Bomb Blast"	1:39
13.	"R.A.M.O.N.E.S" (Motörhead cover)	1:12
14.	"Halfway to Hell"	2:15
15.	"United Streets"	1:46
