= Punk Core Records =

American record label

- Founder: Dave Punk Core
- Genre: Street punk
- Country of origin: United States
- Location: Long Island, New York
- Official website: www.punkcore.com

Punk Core Records was a record label founded in 1989 by Dave Amcher (also known as Dave Punk Core). Based in Long Island, New York, the label originally started as a punk zine/distributor in the late 1980s, becoming a record label in the mid-1990s.

Punk Core Records is often credited for helping revive street punk, a genre that had flourished in early 1980s Britain but had disappeared by the end of the decade. Punk Core Records brought global exposure to many underground bands, especially those from the New York area.

In 2006, Punk Core Records released the compilation DVD, Pure Punk Rock. The DVD was directed by punk filmmaker Lewis Smithingham, and featured live performances from all of the bands on the label. The label is currently inactive with the last record release on March 11, 2008. In 2010, Punk Core Records ceased releasing music.

== Bands ==
- Action
- A Global Threat
- Career Soldiers
- The Casualties
- Clit 45 (Your Life to Choose EP)
- Chaotic Dischord
- Cheap Sex
- Cropknox
- Damage Case
- Defiance
- The Devotchkas
- Fists In The System
- Funeral Dress
- The Havoc
- Instant Agony (Not My Religion EP)
- Lower Class Brats
- Monster Squad
- The Messengers
- Oxblood
- Paxton Boys
- Self Destruct (Violent Affair EP, the band featured members of The Unseen and A Global Threat)
- SS-Kaliert
- The Scarred
- Total Chaos
- The Unseen (The Complete Singles Collection 1994–2000)
- The Varukers
- The Virus
- The Warning

== See also ==
- List of record labels
