= Funeral Dress =

Belgian punk band

- Origin: Belgium
- Genres: Street punk, punk rock
- Years active: 1985–present
- Labels: Punkcore Records, SOS Records
- Website: www.funeraldress.com

Funeral Dress is a street punk band from Belgium who formed in 1985. Their big hits include "I'm in Love with Oi", "Free Beer for the Punx", "Party Political Bullshit", "Party On", "Freedom and Liberty", "Belgium's Burning", "Come On Follow" and "Death & Glory". The band toured the US several times, toured Russia in 2010 for the first time. The band can be seen in the 2007 documentary Punk's Not Dead. Funeral Dress also played festivals like Pukkelpop, Groezrock (2014), Punk Rock Bowling in Las Vegas (2013), Marktrock, and Rebellion (Blackpool).

== Discography ==
Party Political Bullshit - Punkcore Records
1990: Free Beer For The Punx - Funeral Records
1994: Songs 'Bout Sex & Beer & Punkrock - Funeral Records
1995: I'm In Love With OI! - Mad Butcher Records
1996: Singalong Pogo Punk - Nasty Vinyl
1998: Totally Dressed - Step-1 Music
1999: Punk Live And Loud! - We Bite Records
2000: Party Political Bullshit (CD) SOS Records
2001: A Way Of Life (CD) - B Track SOS Records
2001: Down Under (CDsingle) - B Track
2003: Party On (CDsingle) - B Track
2004: Come On Follow - B Track SOS Records
2005: Freedom and Liberty (CDsingle) - Fun-Rec
2006: Hello From The Underground - SOS Records
2009: Global Warning - Fun-Rec
2013: The Sirens Wail EP - Contra Records

== Members ==
Dirk - Vocals
Strum - Lead guitar + vocals
Qrizz - Rhythm guitar + vocals
Stefke - Bass guitar
Joost - Drums
