= Dogsflesh =

English band

- Origin: Teesside, England, UK
- Genres: Punk rock
- Years active: 1982–1985, 2005–present
- Labels: Unrepentant, Rock Garden
- Members: Rob Moore, Guitar, Vocals; Tim Whitfield, Bass; Darren O'Grady, Drums; Dave Earl, Lead Guitar
- Past members: Craig Swallow; Josh Robson; Kev Bambra; Antony Pattison; Steve James; Tommy Heaney; Pete Caveney; Greg Newton; John 'mad-dog' McQuade; John Lavender; Nigel Johnson; Jim; Marty; Perky
- Website: www.dogsflesh.co.uk

Dogsflesh are an English band, formed in May 1982 by guitarist Rob Moore. Considered early pioneers of English hardcore punk, often nicknamed "UK82", they were heavily influenced by The Exploited, GBH, Discharge, and Broken Bones.

Their current musical style has shifted more towards rock / metal, but the band's early influences can still be heard and live shows feature a mix of both styles.

Their initial line-up consisted of Rob on guitar, Perky on Drums, Jim on bass, and Marty on vocals, they played only a handful of gigs together around the Teesside area, the most namely of which was a support slot to GBH at Middlesbrough's Rock Garden. The band recorded a three track demo in November 1982, with tracks called "Never Give In", "Mad Dog" and "Destroy". Perky was replaced on the drums by John Lavender in January 1983, and the band played Redcar's Swan Hotel Ballroom supporting the UK Subs in March of that year. The line-up changed again when Rob moved to Stockton and replaced Jim and Marty with Tim Whitfield on bass and John McQuade on vocals.

In June 1984, Dogsflesh contributed two tracks, "Soldier Boy" and "Fight the System", on the Teesbeat label for a compilation album called the New Bowery. In September 1984, Dogsflesh recruited Nigel Johnson (Nigsy), formerly of Teesside-based punk band The Filth, as lead guitarist. During this time, Dogsflesh continued to write new material and playing gigs locally and to new audiences supporting bands like The Angelic Upstarts in Newcastle, The Anti Nowhere League at the Taboo Club in Scarborough, GBH & Discharge at the Trent Bridge Rowing Club in Nottingham, English Dogs at Adam and Eve's in Leeds and The Exploited at the City Hall in Carlisle.

Dogsflesh recorded a four-track demo at Offbeat Studios in Leeds in February 1985 with tracks called "Fast Living Boy", "Out My Head", "Bloody Road to Death", and their anthem, "Mad Punks And Psycho Skins". A gig in support of The Exploited at The Beer Keller in Leeds led to Wattie Buchan inviting the band to play on the remaining fourteen gigs of The Exploited's tour. Additional support tours followed during the summer of 1985 where Dogsflesh did a twelve-date tour with Broken Bones and a ten date tour with GBH. Soon after, Nigsy and John Lavender quit the band.

== 2005–2009: Re-birth and international shows ==
In 2005, Dogsflesh re-formed with past members Rob Moore, Tim Whitfield, John McQuade, and John Lavender, touring extensively in the UK, Italy France, Czech Republic, Slovakia, and Austria. Richie took over on drums in April 2006 and in August 2007 they headlined the B Stage of the Antifest Festival in the Czech Republic.

In September 2007 the band embarked on their first United States tour playing at 15 gigs. A tour organised and booked by the band themselves with support from American bands at each venue.

Richie was replaced in May 2008 by Greg Newton. In 2009, Dogsflesh continued to play throughout the UK and Europe.

Dogsflesh re-released the Bloody Road to Death EP in May 2005 and recorded a live album, Live At Wakefield 2005, which was released in October 2005. In October 2006, Dogsflesh released a 4-track EP, The Threat Remains, and in 2007 their album, Vision Of Hell, was released on Rock Garden Music in the UK. In 2008, Vision Of Hell was re-pressed and released in North America on Unrepentant Records.

== 2009–2014: UK, Europe and second album ==
In 2009, long time serving frontman John McQuade stepped down but the band continued as a three piece with guitarist Rob Moore undertaking lead vocals. After maintaining momentum in 2009 with gigs in the UK, Germany, France and Belgium, Dogsflesh returned to the studio with fresh material. In March 2010 the band's second album Revival Of Species was completed in Stoke-on-Trent's Prism Studios. Produced and mastered by Shaun Lowe. This recordings commercial rights remained with Rock Garden Records with US distribution via Unrepentant Records. The band continued to gig in the UK and Europe during 2010. Plans for a second US tour were placed on hold with the departure of drummer Greg Newton. Short spells in the drum seat followed for Pete Caveney and Steve Wingrove before the arrival of Darlington-based drummer Tommey Heaney in December 2011.

During 2012, Dogsflesh continued to gig in the UK and Europe performing in Germany at the Resists To Exist Festival (Berlin) with other dates in Czech Republic, Belgium and France. The serious illness of Tommy's wife in 2013 made drummer, guitarist and songwriter Steve Wingrove rejoin the band. Dogsflesh made their debut appearance at the world's biggest punk festival 'Rebellion', opening up Saturday's festival on the Olympia 1 stage. Following positive reviews of their performance the band continued to write new material and welcomed further bookings in Europe before commencing the 'Chaos In The UK' Tour in November 2013.

== 2015–2016 ==
2015 saw some big changes for the band in line-up and musical direction. Steve Wingrove moved on to other projects and two new members came into the group. Kev Bambra took over on drums and lead guitarist Anth 'Patti' Pattison took over on lead guitar. The new line-up quickly gelled and started to produce new material with more of a rock / metal feel. The band's trademark energy remained, but the new material carried a broader appeal and attracted interest away from the band's traditional hardcore punk following. Tracks like "So Fucked Up" and "Lamb To the Slaughter" represented this new style.

The band gigged throughout 2015 across the UK (including an appearance at the North East Calling festival), Holland, Germany (Berlin) and in early 2016 the band performed in Greece for the first time, at the country's biggest punk Festival, 'Vive Le Punk' in Athens.

== 2016: Third album ==
With a strong stable line-up featuring accessible new material, Dogsflesh moved forward in 2016 and reduced their live appearances to record a further six tracks for the release of their third studio album, Critical Response. The album was recorded at Prism Studios in Stoke-on-Trent and produced and mixed by Shaun Lowe. The album is musically diverse, with the band moving into a more 'crossover' style between punk and metal, with a range of tracks that stretch into and blend both musical genres whilst creating something entirely unique. The title itself, Critical Response carried a double meaning. The album providing a Critical (emergency) response to the stagnated punk scene in some areas of the UK, and knowing the new sound on the album may challenge some of their more traditional fan-base, it invited peoples critical reaction to it. Released in December 2016, Critical Response included a spread of diverse songs, some more 'rock punk' than 'punk rock'.

== 2017: US tour ==
Ten years after their first tour of America Dogsflesh returned to the States, this time to the mid-west to playing their unique brand of UK 82 Punk mixed with some newer material accompanied by Milwaukee based punk band ZOR who provided invaluable support with bookings, logistics, equipment and accommodation. The tour included Milwaukee, Madison, Des Moines, St Louis, Tulsa, Fort Worth and Dallas.

== 2017-Present (2023) ==
Following the Midwest US tour, the band recruited some new members. Dave Earl joined on lead guitar and Teesside drummer Josh Robson was recruited. Both players brought creativity and fresh energy to the band enabling Dogsflesh to resume playing in the UK and around Europe, France in Particular. Craig Swallow took over on drums in 2019 and again the band played both UK and abroad, including a very successful tour in France circa 2018 that included Montpellier, Paris, Dijon Geneva. They also extended further into the metal scene with a main stage appearance at the Hard Rock Hell festival at Birmingham o2 Academy. In 2019 Work started on the bands 4th studio album, but the onset of the COVID shutdown and the departure of Craig Swallow meant it was not until 2022 that the band recruited experienced drummer Darren O'Grady (formerly with Motorheadache) and with Darren firmly atop the drum throne the band finally made it into the studio to record the 1st 6 tracks of that album. As at January 2023 the band are working on the final 6 tracks with a view to releasing the album in the spring and returning to live performances.

== International appearances: 2005–2023 ==
- Czech Republic (x10), Slovakia (1), Austria (1) Netherlands (x4) Italy (x6), France (x10) Germany (x6) Belgium (x3) Switzerland (x1) United States Of America (15), Greece (1)

== Major festivals played ==
- Anitfest (Cz Replublic), Resist To Exist (Germany), Rebellion (UK), North East Calling (UK), Vive La Punk (Greece), Festival Maloka (France), Hard Rock Hell (UK, Birmingham)

== Discography ==
=== Studio albums ===
- Vision Of Hell - Unrepentant Records (US Pressing) - 2008
- Vision Of Hell - Rock Garden Music - 2007
- Revival Of Species - Rock Garden Music - 2010
- Critical Response - Released on download and CD November 2016.
- March Of The Damned - Pending release spring/Summer 2023

=== Singles/demos ===
- "Never Give In" - 1982
- "Mad Dog" - 1982
- "Destroy" - 1982
- "Fast Living Boy" - 1985
- "Out My Head" - 1985
- "Bloody Road to Death" - 1985
- "Mad Punks And Psycho Skins" - 1985

=== Live albums ===
- Live at Wakefield - Rock Garden Music - 2005

=== EPs ===
- Bloody Road to Death - Rock Garden Music (Re-release) - 2005
- The Threat Remains - Rock Garden Music - 2006

=== Compilation albums ===
- New Bowery - Teesbeat - 1984
- Kids Union Records Comp - 2009
- Split Artist EP (with 'Psycho Sickness') released in Malaysia / Far East by Guldang Records

== See also ==
- UK82
