= Booze & Glory =

Polish-British street punk band

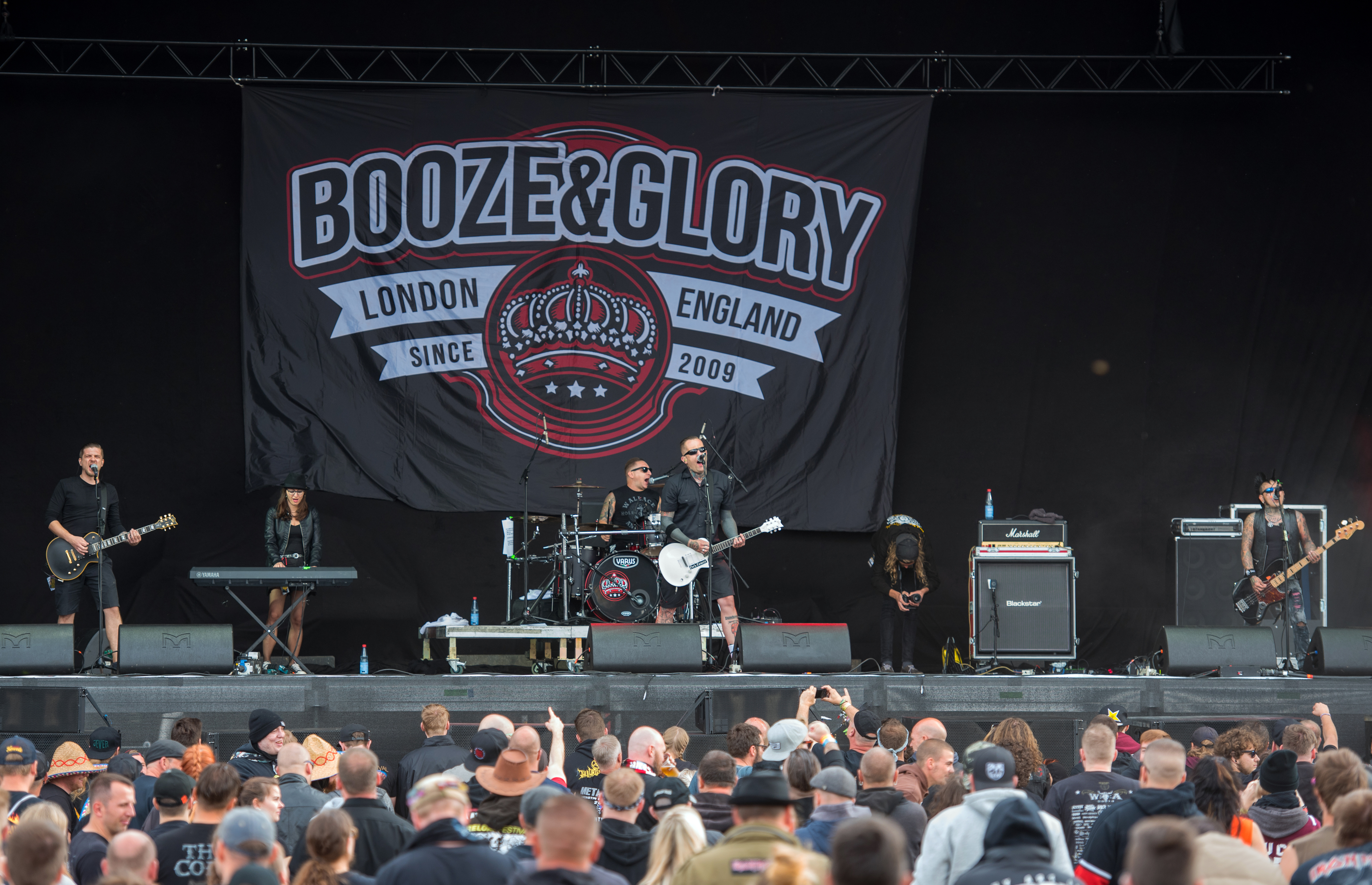
- Booze & Glory at the Reload Festival 2018

Background information
- Origin: London, England
- Genres: Oi!, street punk
- Years active: 2009–present
- Members: Marek Rusek; Kahan; Frank Pellegrino; Herve J Laurent; Manny Anzaldo
- Past members: Liam Marr; Mario; Bart; Bubbles; Tommy Storback; Psycho Al; Chema Zurita
- Website: www.boozeandglory.com

Booze & Glory are an international punk band with roots in the Polish migrant punk scene in the UK, formed in London in 2009. They play primarily Oi! and street punk music.

== History ==
Booze & Glory was formed in London in 2009 by Mark (vocals), Liam (guitar), Bartez (bass) and Mario (drums). Mark, Bartez and Mario are originally from Poland and were already known in the Oi! scene there. In 2010 the band released their debut album Always on the Wrong Side through 84 Records. Two Split EPs followed, one with the Harington Saints and the other with The Warriors. In 2011 the band released their second album, Trouble Free. The band have also released various EPs as well as a Singles Collection, with the song "London Skinhead Crew", for which a video was also recorded. The video has been viewed more than thirty-five million times on YouTube and as of July 2026, has been the band's most successful song.

In 2013 Bartez and Mario left the group citing family reasons. They were replaced by the Swedish drummer T. Cliché (from The Clichés and Clockwork Crew) and Bubbles. The band signed a recording contract with Step-1 Music in 2014 and released their album As Bold as Brass. In 2017 the band released Chapter IV and in 2019 they released Hurricane.

== Music style and lyrics ==
Booze & Glory play modern British Oi! with many singalongs and catchy rhythms. In their lyrics they cover many British topics, from singing about the working class to their description of the London skinhead scene via songs about drinking beer. Their lyrics show patriotism towards England and pride in London and the football club West Ham United. However the band is also proud to have members of different nationalities, and has positioned itself clearly against the right-wing Skinhead scene, while taking an apolitical stance otherwise.

== Members ==
Current members

- Marek Rusek – vocals (2009-present), rhythm guitar (2009–2023)
- Kahan – guitars, backing vocals (2018–present)
- Frank Pellegrino – drums, percussion, backing vocals (2015–present)
- Manny Anzaldo - rhythm guitar (2024-present)
- Herve J Laurent - bass (2024-present)

Former members

- Liam Marr – vocals, guitar (2009–2017)
- Mario – drums (2009–2013)
- Bart – bass, backing vocals (2009–2012)
- Bubbles – bass, backing vocals (2012–2017)
- Tommy Storback – drums (2013–2015)
- Psycho Al bass, backing vocals (2017)
- Chema Zurita – bass guitar, backing vocals (2017–2024)
- Paolo Paganelli - rhythm guitar (2023-2024) bass (2024)

Timeline

== Discography ==
=== Albums ===
- 2010: Always on the Wrong Side (84 Records)
- 2011: Trouble Free (84 Records)
- 2014: As Bold as Brass (Step-1 Music)
- 2017: Chapter IV
- 2019: Hurricane
- 2025: Whiskey Tango Foxtrot

=== Compilations ===
- 2012: Oi! Ain't Dead (Split CD with Old Firm Casuals, Razorblade and The Corps, Rebellion Records)
- 2013: London Skinhead Crew (Singles Collection) (Step-1 Music)

=== EPs and singles ===
- 2010: Bruce Roehrs Memorial (Split EP with Harrington Saints, Pirates Press Records)
- 2010: England (Split EP with The Warriors, Randale Records)
- 2012: ...On the Booze! (Split EP with On the Job, Contra Records)
- 2012: Oi! The Super Heroes (Split EP with Agent Bulldogg, Gimp Fist and The Sandals, Bad Look Records)
- 2012: "Back Where We Belong" (feat. Micky Fitz, 7", Step-1 Music)
- 2017: The Reggae Session Vol 1 (with Vespa & The Londonians, Contra Records)
- 2021: reggae sessions volume 2
- 2022: raising the roof
- 2023: Latarnia (tribute to the analogs)
