= Total Chaos =

American punk rock band

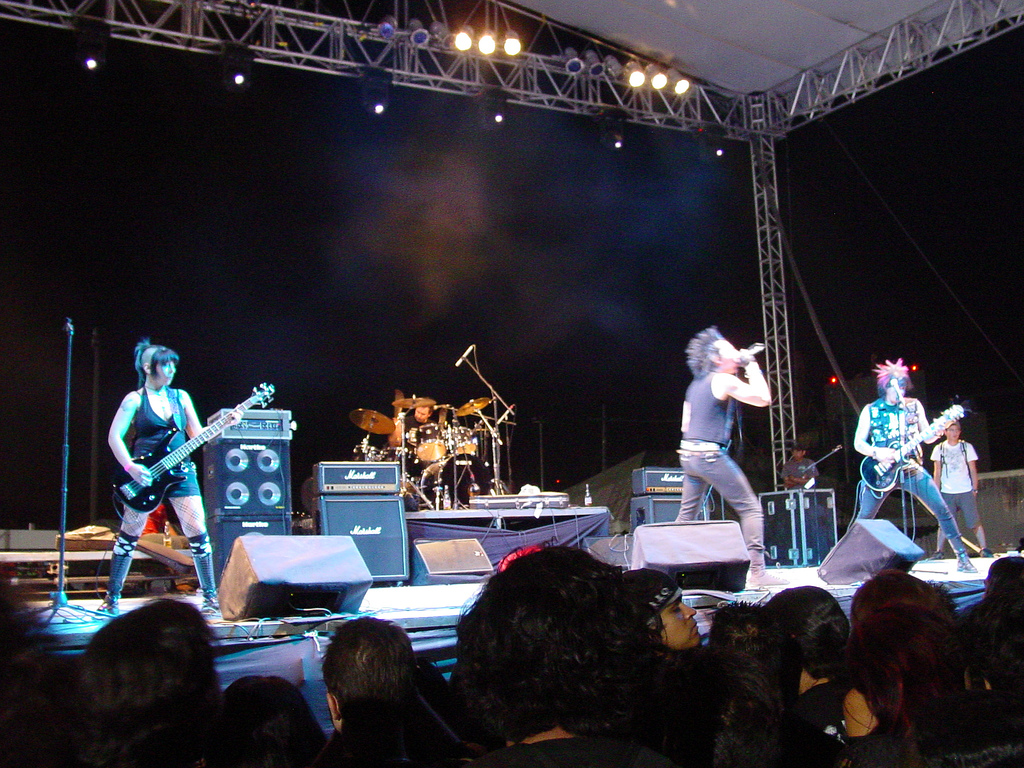
- Total Chaos live in Mexico, 2007

Background information
- Origin: Pomona, California
- Genres: Hardcore punk; street punk; punk rock
- Years active: 1989–present
- Labels: Punk Core; Epitaph; People Like You; SOS; Cleopatra; Stomp; Pavement Entertainment
- Members: Rob Chaos; Shawn Smash; Miguel Conflict; Geordy Justify
- Past members: Gary Doom; Ronald McMurder; Kraig Marshall; Germ; Foffle; Suzy Homewrecker; Steven Gearbox; Danny Boy Virus; Joe E. Bastard; Charlie Brenes; Dede Gearhardt; ToddTrash; Chema Zurita; Matt Ren Ex Renicks

Total Chaos is an American hardcore punk band from Pomona, California, formed in 1989. Lead vocalist Rob Chaos is also co-owner of SOS Records with Ezzat Soliman, owner of the Showcase Theater, having released albums by classic punk and Oi! bands like the Exploited, Vice Squad, Sham 69, Conflict, the Adicts and Abrasive Wheels among others. With help of Jay Lee from the band Resist and Exist, the band started organizations such as United Valley Punks, Orange County Peace Punks and Alternative Gathering Collective. Together, they held such social events as Food Not Bombs, helped open the Los Angeles Anarchist Center and supported the Big Mountain Indian Reservation.

== History ==
Formed in 1989, the first Total Chaos line up consisted of vocalist Rob Chaos, guitarist Gary Doom, bassist Joe E. Bastard and drummer Gearbox. In 1991, the band recorded their first demo titled Punk Invasion, followed by the 7-inch EP Nightmares in 1992. In 1993, the band recorded their debut album We Are the Punx, We Are the Future. Shortly after Gary Doom left the band, being replaced by Ronald McMurder, a tour in Mexico with the Mexican band Yaps was booked, having most of the venues sold out.

Epitaph Records decided to sign the band to release the 1994 album Pledge of Defiance. The album featured a song about Gomer Pyle. To support the album release, a tour was booked with the Mighty Mighty Bosstones. After the end of the tour, a second album for Epitaph Records was recorded in 1995, Patriotic Shock, adding Germ as second guitarist. Once again, the band toured for the release, this time with Battalion of Saints. Due to the strong message against racism and socio-political subjects, the band faced racist and nationalist organizations at the shows and the ban of the album in Japan. In the summer of the same year, Total Chaos visited Europe for the first time, with a new lead guitarist, Shawn Smash, playing in Germany for the Chaos Days festival, well known for the often violent environment.

In 1996, Rob Chaos, Joe E. Bastard and Shawn Smash recruited Suzy Homewrecker on drums to record a new album titled Anthems From the Alleyway. This album differs from the others because of the 70s punk rock influenced sound. By 1997, the band lost contact with Epitaph Records while recording demos for the upcoming album, mainly because of the drug rehab of label founder Brett Gurewitz and poor communication with the label president Andy Kalukin. For these reasons, the band decided to leave Epitaph Records.

By early 1998, Total Chaos disbanded, although by September the group reformed without Homewrecker, who was (according to the official Total Chaos website) stealing the band's T-shirts, selling them at a discounted price and keeping the profits herself. Total Chaos asked Traci Michaels to fill in for one show, which was the reunion show at the Showcase Theatre. They continued to search for drummers and found Danny Boy Virus. The band then signed with Cleopatra Records to release the In God We Kill in 1999 and the compilation Early Years 89-93 with the early demos and LPs. The band got back to touring with Blanks77 and in 2000 completed its first Japanese tour. Shortly after, the band recorded Punk Invasion, released on Reject Records in 2001, with Todd Trash playing bass and Danny Boy Virus on drums.

In 2002, the band was invited to the Warped Tour, with bands like the Casualties, Pistol Grip, Mighty Mighty Bosstones, Anti-Flag and Bad Religion among others. After the tour, original drummer Gearbox returned with the band, and with the new bassist Charlie, ex-member Life's Halt, the band released Freedom Kills with SOS Records, and toured with the Adicts, the Exploited and Conflict.

On October 14, 2003, the band was scheduled to play in Montreal with the Exploited, but due to legal issues, both bands were retained at the U.S. border. One of the reasons was because the Exploited lied to the Canadian Customs, saying it was a road trip, and they were not a band, being caught when an employee showed a photo of Wattie on stage performing with the band. Total Chaos' entrance was denied due to the criminal records of some members, although Rob chaos stated: "It should be against the law to pry into someone's past and dig up something they'd done 15 years ago". After the cancellation of the show, some fans decided to cause riots and disorder, some cars and shops were damaged, as well as a few police officers injured and an undisclosed number of people were arrested. The events were widely covered by the media.

== Discography ==
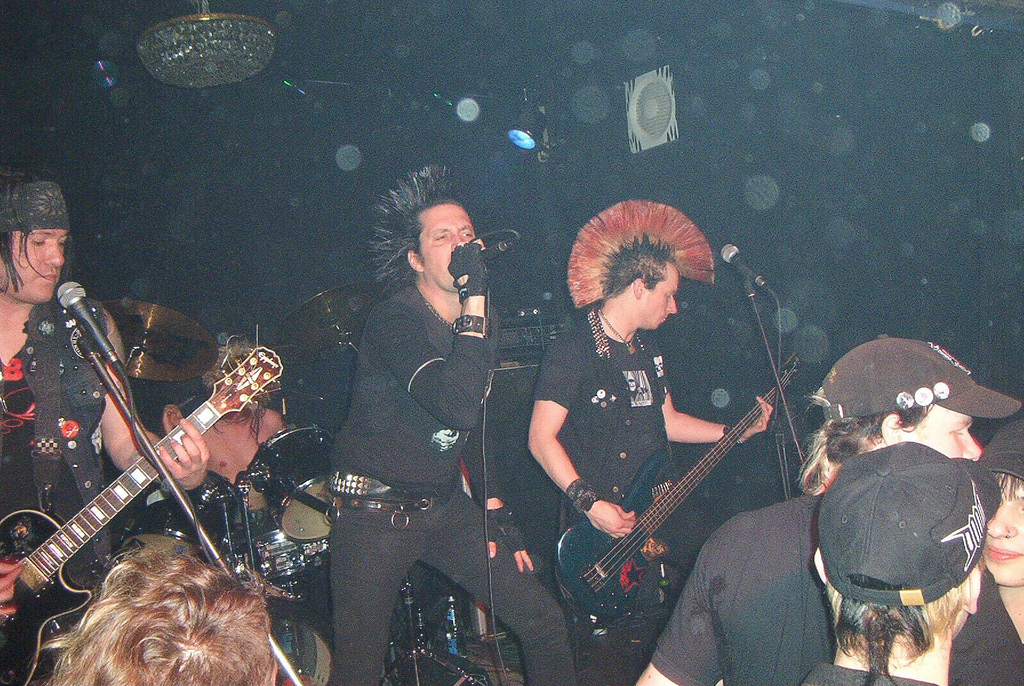
Total Chaos in 2008

=== Studio albums ===
- Mind Warfare - 2023, Pavement Entertainment
- World of Insanity – 2015 (US)/2016 (EU), SOS-Chaos Entertainment
- Battered And Smashed – 2011, Concrete Jungle Records/Stomp Records
- Avoid All Sides – 2008, Punk Core Records/People Like You
- Freedom Kills – 2003, SOS Records/People Like You
- Punk Invasion – 2001, SOS Records/People Like You
- In God We Kill – 1999, Cleopatra Records
- Anthems From the Alleyway – 1996, Epitaph Records
- Patriotic Shock – 1995, Epitaph Records
- Pledge of Defiance – 1994, Epitaph Records
- We Are the Punx, We Are the Future – 1993, Chaos Records

=== EPs ===
- Street Punx – 2017, SOS-Chaos Entertainment
- D. U. I: Drunk Unemployed Incarcerated – 2002, Reject Records
- Nightmares – 1992, self-released
- Punk Invasion (Demo) – 1991, self-released

=== Digital Singles ===
- Selena Was a Punk Rocker – 2025, Cleopatra Records (the Ramones cover)

=== Splits ===
- Revolution Has No Borders (w/ Acidez) – 2018, SOS-Chaos Entertainment/BamBam Records

=== Compilations ===
- 30 Years of Chaos: Best Of – 2019, SOS-Chaos Entertainment
- 17 Years of Chaos – 2007, SOS Records.
- The Feedback Continues 1990–1992 – 2007, Gutter Shock.
- Years of Chaos – 2006, I Used to Fuck People Like You in Prison
- Early Years 89-93 – 2000, Cleopatra Records

=== Various artists compilation appearances ===
- Hooligans United: A Tribute to Rancid – 2015, Hellcat Records, Smelvis Records
- I Killed Punk Rock – 2006, Bouncing Betty
- Dirty Punk Records Sampler – 2006, Dirty Punk Records
- Punk and Disorderly – 2003, Cleopatra Records
- A Punk Tribute to Metallica – 2001, Cleopatra Records
- Smells Like Bleach: A Punk Tribute to Nirvana – 2000, Cleopatra Records
- Never Mind the Sex Pistols, Here's the Tribute – 2000, Radical Records
- Punk-O-Rama Vol. 1 – 1994, Epitaph Records
