= Picture Frame Seduction =

Welsh hardcore punk band

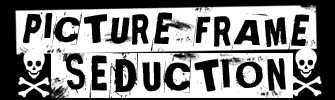

Background information
- Origin: Haverfordwest, Wales
- Genres: Punk rock, UK82, anarcho-punk
- Years active: 1978–1987, 2000–present
- Labels: Insane UK, Rot Records So-So UK, CuitJam UK/Spain, Violated USA, Grand Theft Audio USA, Puke n' Vomit USA, Cider City UK, Nausea Records UK

Picture Frame Seduction (PFS) is a hardcore punk band originally from Haverfordwest, Wales, but later jointly based in Cádiz in Spain Istanbul Turkey, London and Bristol in the UK. In their formative years in Wales the band was considered too aggressive in their musical style and attitude to book and were continually ignored by established Welsh venues. The band's influences included their peers of the day, Charged GBH Exploited and Discharge. With many other bands of the time, such as The Varukers and Chaos UK, they helped develop the hardcore punk scene in the United Kingdom in the early to mid-1980s, recording from 1979 to 1987 on numerous labels.

PFS disbanded in 1987 but reformed in 1999, after being featured on several punk compilation albums in the intervening years.

== History ==
Their first gig took place at Sir Thomas Picton School, Haverfordwest in December 1978 — a chaotic show remembered for the band’s younger members experimenting with alcohol, Keith collapsing, and then-manager Barrie O’Dare stepping in on vocals.

In January 1979, the band changed their name officially to Picture Frame Seduction. Early recordings include contributions to the Demolition Blues compilation (Insane Records, 1982), with airplay by John Peel.

Through the 1980s the band gigged extensively, touring the UK with the UK Subs (1984) and sharing bills with The Exploited, Conflict, and the Varukers. Notable venues included the 100 Club (1984, 1986, headlining 1987), the Greyhound in London (1984, with Urban Dogs), Ronnie Scott’s jazz club (1985, with Urban Dogs), and Leeds Bierkeller (1984–85, promoted by Nik Toczek and Ginger John).

Touring in 1984 took them to Cardiff, Bristol, Birmingham, Gateshead, Ferryhill, Nottingham, Liverpool, Glasgow, London (twice), Swaffham, Whitland,Gravesend,Sunderland and many more. The 1985 tour added Penzance, Cardiff,Swansea, Pembroke Dock, Haverfordwest, Llanelli, Ammanford, Treorchy, and St Albans, Bedford, including London slots with Conflict.

The band were regulars at the Rebellion Festival in Blackpool, starting in 2006, and have played across Europe, including Holland,Belgium, Italy, Spain, Czech Republic, Greece and Austria.

Keith Haynes briefly drummed with Discharge in 1980, before returning to Picture Frame Seduction.

The band continues to record and perform, with new vinyl Wild/Life released September 14, 2025 on CultJam Records (limited edition 12", three colors, 100 each, total 300 copies).

== Discography ==
=== Studio albums ===
- Sex War (2002, CultJam Records, CD; sales ~6,400 via Plastic Head and Cadiz, released in Europe and Australia)
- Suicide Run (2017, Violated Records, USA, vinyl/CD; reissued 2019. Produced/engineered by Colin Baker & Ned Hayfield at Maverick Studios, Bristol)
- Wild/Life (2024, CultJam Records, CD; includes tribute track "Where’s Johnny Gone" for Marcus of Foreign Legion)
- Wild/Life (2025, CultJam Records ES, limited edition 12" vinyl in 3 colors, 300 total; recorded in Cádiz, Spain, produced by Fernandez Domingo)

There is a planned retro release on Nausea Records going back as far as 1979, including LIVE unreleased material for late 2026, early 2027.

=== EPs & Singles ===
- I’m Good Enough for Me (1984, So-So Records, 12" EP – tracks: "I’m Good Enough for Me", "Fur Queue", "Sabotage the Classes")
- Hand of the Rider (1984/85, PFS 1, 12" EP – artwork by Jon Parsons; reissued 2012 by Puke n’ Vomit Records, USA)
- Interrupted Piss (2017, Cider City Records, 7" vinyl EP – recorded 25 July & 5 August 2016 at Maverick Studios, Bristol; engineered by Colin Baker, Ned Hayfield & Alex Getting; cover art by Ewen Hyde; published by CultJam Publishing 2017)

=== Compilations ===
- Stop the Bloody Slaughter: Discography 1978–1986 (2006, Grand Theft Audio, USA; includes unreleased tracks: "Four From the Mountains" sessions, "Help in Any Way", "Nazi Flu", "Pearl Harbour", Picture Frame Seduction (1978/79), Live in Manchester Clouds (1985), Demolition Blues outtakes, "Sanity", "Rebellion", "Nuclear Free Zone" (Berkshire 1982, unreleased). Sold largely in Japan and USA.)

== Band members ==
=== Current members ===
- Keith Haynes – vocals (1981–1987, 2000–present); drums (1978–1981; briefly with Discharge in 1980)
- Can Oguz – guitar (2019–present)
- Dave Pearce (a.k.a. Dave Crisis) – bass (2016–present)
- Mihails "Mish" Zizkuns – drums (2019–present)

=== Former members ===
- Mark Bozier – guitar (1984-1987; deceased)
- Steve Parkin – bass (1984-1986)
- Jonathon "Griff" Griffiths – drums (1981–2011; deceased)
- Robin Folland – guitar (1978–2011)
- Tim Horsley - bass / vocals (1979 - 1983)
- Nigel Drumm - bass(1979)
- Steve Arthur – bass (2002–2011)
- Martin Hope – guitar (2018–2024)
- Ewen Hyde – drums (2016-2017)

=== Associated contributors ===
- Andrew Hawkey – producer (1984–1987) Good enough for me EP and Hand of the Rider
- Jon Parsons – artwork (Hand of the Rider)
- Fish (The Skeptix) – mastering (Sex War)
- Ned Hayfield – producer/engineer, Suicide Run and Interrupted Piss (deceased)
- Colin Baker - producer/engineer, Suicide Run and Interrupted Piss
