= Antidote (band) =

Dutch punk rock band

- Origin: Amsterdam/Rotterdam/Utrecht, Netherlands
- Genre: Punk rock
- Years active: 1996–2012, 2017
- Labels: Dirty Faces (Europe); Rodent Popsicle (US); Charged Records (US); Attack Records (Europe); Neurempire Records (Russia)
- Members: Bart Smeels; Arne Smeels; Joris van Hoboken; Jaeques Koeman; Huib van Oostendorp
- Website: www.antidote.nl

Antidote is a Dutch punk band formed in 1996. Inspiration for the band came when the band members had a jam session at the squat De Blauwe Aanslag. The band has released five full-length studio albums and toured extensively across Europe, North America, and Russia with prominent US punk bands such as The Casualties and The Virus. Antidote's music has been categorized as punk, Street punk, or Oi!. They write politically motivated songs with lyrics that support the squatting movement, are anti-fascist, anti-homophobic, and even criticize the punk scene itself.

In December 2012, Antidote officially announced their break-up. However, in 2017, the band reunited for a series of festival performances. Bart and Arne Smeels, members of Antidote, have been active with the Utrecht-based punk band Bakfietsboys, and Arne Smeels has also produced solo cassettes as Arne S.

== Discography ==
=== Studio albums (LP/CD) ===
1. 1999: "My Life!" LP/CD Charged Records (LP/CD), 2001 Dirty Faces (pic LP/CD), 2005 Neuroempire Records (CD)
2. 2000: Go Pogo! 10"/LP/CD Dirty Faces (10"/LP/CD), 2001 Charged Records (LP/CD), 2005 Neuroempire Records (CD)
3. 2003: Back in Year Zero LP/CD Dirty Faces, 2005 Neuroempire Records, 2006 Rodent Popsicle Records
4. 2006: Another Dose LP/CD Dirty Faces (LP/CD), Rodent Popsicle Records (CD), Neuroempire Records (CD), SOS Records (CD)
5. 2007: No communication LP/CD Dirty Faces (LP/CD), Rodent Popsicle Records (LP/CD), Neuroempire Records (CD)

=== EPs (7") ===
- 1997: Bounce the Bouncer 7", Injection Records
- 1998: Let's Get Drunk 7", Injection Records, 2001, Dirty Faces (pic 7")
- 2000: De Blauwe Moet Blijven 7", Injection Records

=== Demo ===
- 1997 s/t demotape

=== Split EPs (7") ===
- split with Seein Red, 2004 Attack Records
- split with NY-Relx, 2002 Dirty Faces
- "Keine Arbeit" split with The Shocks and Die Strohsäcke, 2000, Attack Records
- split met Worhäts, 1999 Attack Records

=== Samplers (incomplete) ===
- Human Dust Punk/HC compilation 7", 1999, Na Und Records
- Internationally Yours compilation 7", (Ditchdiggin Records, 1999) contributed song "Automatically"
- Punx Unite 2 LP/CD (Charged Records, 2000) contributed song "Waste Of Time"
- Punk and Disoi!rderly, (Step One Music, 2001) contributed song "How Can We Live"
- Plastic Bomb #43 – Entartete Musik (Plastic Bomb, 2003) contributed song "Fuck The Media"
- 10 Jahre Attack Records 7", (Attack Records, 2004) contributed song "Laat Me Met Rust"
- Rotten Schwuchtel Sampler (Gay Edge Liberation, 2009) contributed song "Fuck Homophobia"
- Oi! Made In Holland 2 (Rebellion Records, 2013) contributed song "Let's Get Drunk"
- 25 Years Attack Records (Attack Records, 2019) contributed song "Dog Story"
