= On the Front Line (The Casualties album) =

Studio album by The Casualties
- Released: February 17, 2004
- Recorded: 2003
- Studio: The Blasting Room, Fort Collins, Colorado
- Genre: Street punk
- Length: 35:00
- Label: SideOneDummy
- Producer: Bill Stevenson

The Casualties chronology
| Die Hards (2001) | On the Front Line (2004) | En la Línea del Frente (2005) |

Professional ratings
Review scores
| Source | Rating |
|---|---|
| Allmusic | link |

On the Front Line is the fifth album from street punk band The Casualties. It is their second release under Side One Dummy Records, and arguably their most famous with that label. It was released in 2004, and re-released in 2005, as En la Línea del Frente, which was recorded with Spanish vocals, the mother tongue of Jorge, lead singer. It is their best selling album.

The album was rated 3 out of 5 stars by AllMusic. Meanwhile, it was rated 0.5 out of 5 stars by PunkNews.org.

== Track listing ==
All music is composed by The Casualties.

| No. | Title | Length |
|---|---|---|
| 1. | "Casualties Army" | 1:16 |
| 2. | "On the Front Line" | 2:23 |
| 3. | "Leaders of Today" | 2:28 |
| 4. | "Criminal Class" | 3:15 |
| 5. | "Tomorrow Belongs To Us" | 2:50 |
| 6. | "Unknown Soldier" | 3:05 |
| 7. | "Scarred For Life" | 2:16 |
| 8. | "Static Feedback and Noise" | 2:27 |
| 9. | "Media Control" | 2:12 |
| 10. | "Death Toll" | 2:12 |
| 11. | "Tragedy" | 2:28 |
| 12. | "Brainwashed" | 2:16 |
| 13. | "Sounds From the Streets" | 2:34 |
| 14. | "We Don't Need You" | 3:01 |
| Total length: | | 35:00 |

== Personnel ==
The Casualties

- Jorge Herrera- lead vocals
- Rick Lopez - vocals, bass guitar
- Jake Kolatis - vocals, guitar
- Marc "Meggers" Eggers - drums

Artwork

- BrandNewAge - album design
- Mick Stern - enhanced CD design
- Helen Cotter, Paul Cotter, Jocelyn Dean, Greg Dixon, & Michelle Dosson - photography

Production

- Bill Stevenson – producer, engineer, mixing
- Jason Livermore – producer, engineer, mastering

== Chart history ==
| Chart (2003) | Peak position |
|---|---|
| Top Heatseekers | 7 |
| Top Independent Albums | 8 |

== Appearance in other media ==
- The song Unknown Soldier was used as part of the Tony Hawk's Underground 2 soundtrack.
