= The Devotchkas =

American street punk band

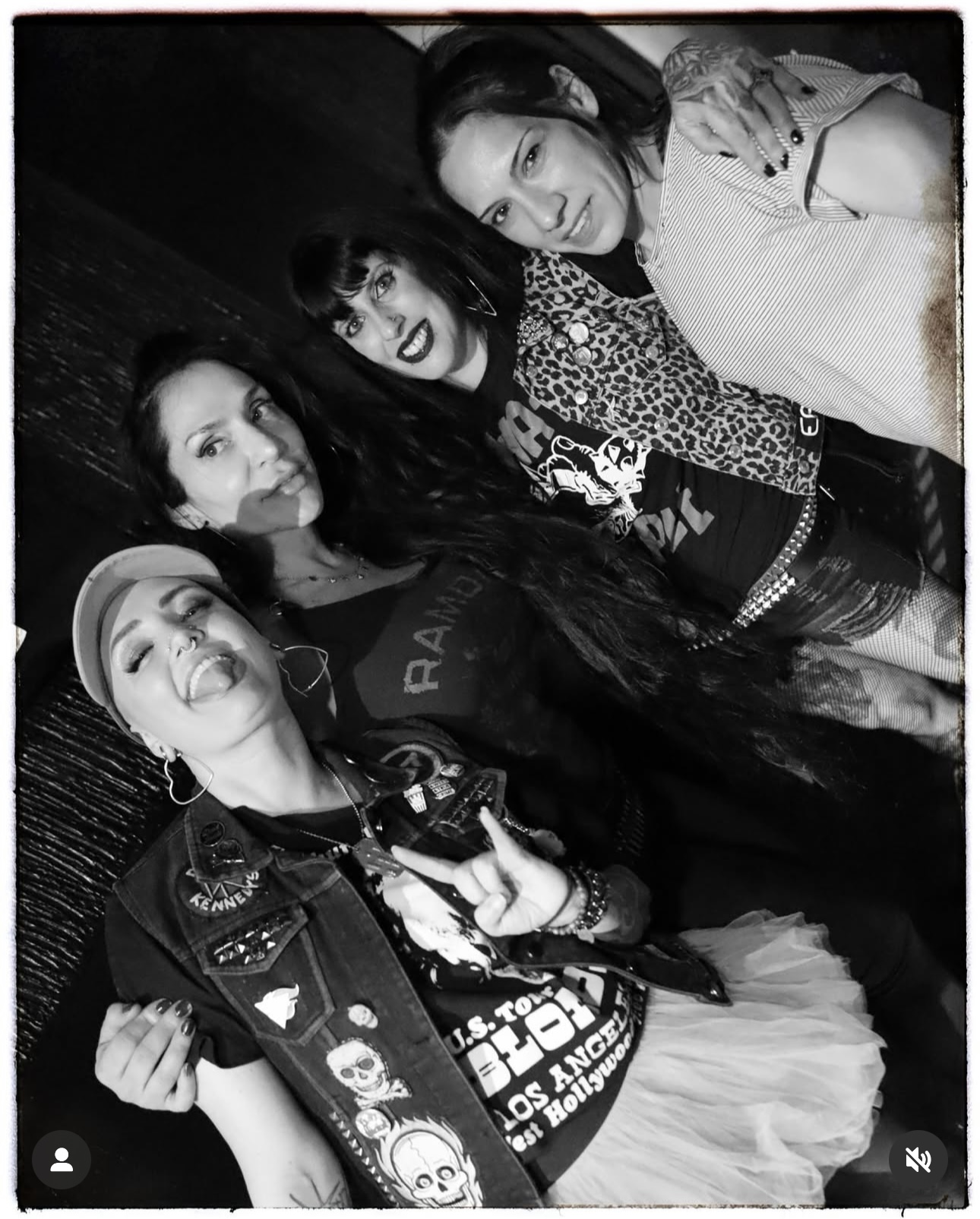
- The Devotchkas at Punk Invasion, Los Angeles, March 2025. Photo by zer_ghoul (Instagram)

Background information
- Origin: New York City
- Genre: Street punk
- Years active: 1996–current
- Labels: Punk Core Records, Dig My Grave Records
- Members: Gabrielle; Mande; Alaine; Jennifer “JJ” Leigh
- Past members: Jon; Stephanie
- Website: thedevotchkas.com

The Devotchkas are a four-piece American street punk band from New York City. Their name was derived from the popular film and novel A Clockwork Orange. Devotchka in Nadsat means "girl", which is itself derived from the Russian word (девочка) of the same meaning.

In 2021 shortly before the band’s 20-year reunion in September 2022 at Los Angeles “CY Fest”, The Devotchkas were named one of “20 Important Female-led rock bands you should know” on Rarepeace.

== Early years/line-ups ==
An all-girl group, the band was formed by three friends in 1996. The early period saw drummers come and go, including Jon from The Krays. Wanting a permanent drummer, they eventually recruited Gabrielle in 1999 to complete the line-up.

In 1998, they were signed to Punk Core Records for the release of their debut EP, which sold in excess of 5,000 copies, a surprisingly high number for a band's debut EP, especially on vinyl format. In 2000, Punkcore released The Devotchkas second 7-inch EP and an extended version CD, both named "Annihilation". Following their six-week-long 2001 European tour to support the release of "Annihilation", singer Stephanie exited the band. The role of vocalist was then filled by Jennifer Leigh (aka “JJ”), who sang on their 2002 album Live Fast, Die Young. For a very brief period, the band toyed with the idea of changing their name to The 99s, however, this was a fleeting idea which they quickly recanted and they continued forward as The Devotchkas. In support of their 2002 release, the Devotchkas went on a successful European tour in the summer of 2002. Shortly thereafter, the band members decided to part ways for a long hiatus. In January 2022, the Devotchkas announced a reunion show at CY Fest in Los Angeles, California for September 2022, featuring the same line-up from the band's Live Fast Die Young album, in celebration of the 20-year anniversary of the album.

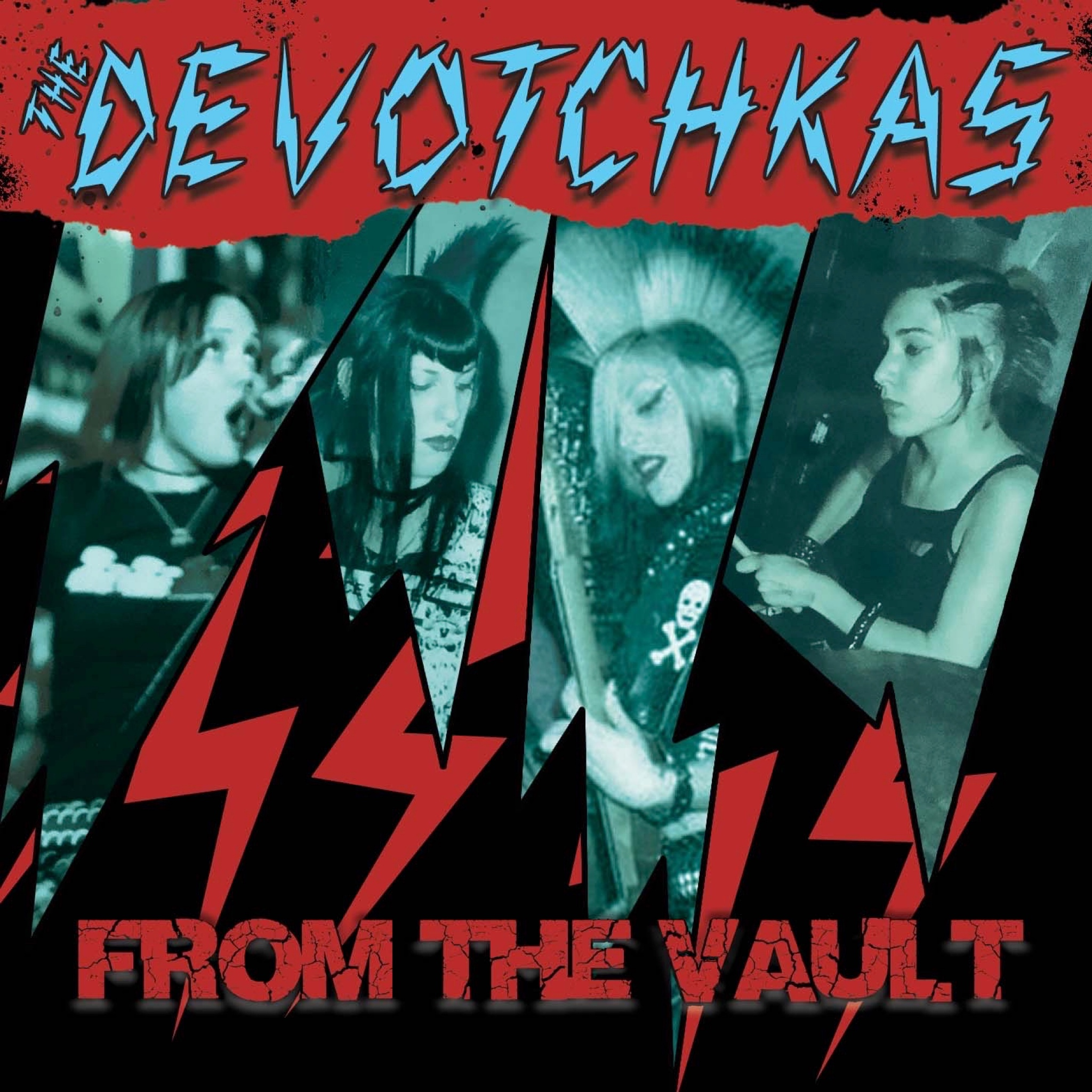

== 20-year reunion at CY Fest 2022, 2023 ==
A limited color flexi entitled “From The Vault” was released for the festival, featuring two tracks - “My Scars” and a previously unreleased version of “Wicked Heart”. For their return to CY Fest in 2023, they released a special edition repressing of Live Fast, Die Young which included 2 previously unreleased live tracks from CBGBS recorded in 2001, as well as a previously unreleased vocal scratch track version of “Wicked Heart”. They are currently the only official new releases by the band.

After the band’s positive reception at the festival and its pre-show, the band was invited to play again at CY Fest for 2023, and also announced their addition to 2023’s Rebellion Festival in Blackpool, although the band shortly thereafter postponed their appearance at Rebellion until 2024. The band cancelled their performance for 2024 coinciding with the death of vocalist Jennifer “JJ” Leigh’s father. The band reunited to perform again in Los Angeles at Punk Invasion in March 2025, again garnering positive reviews.

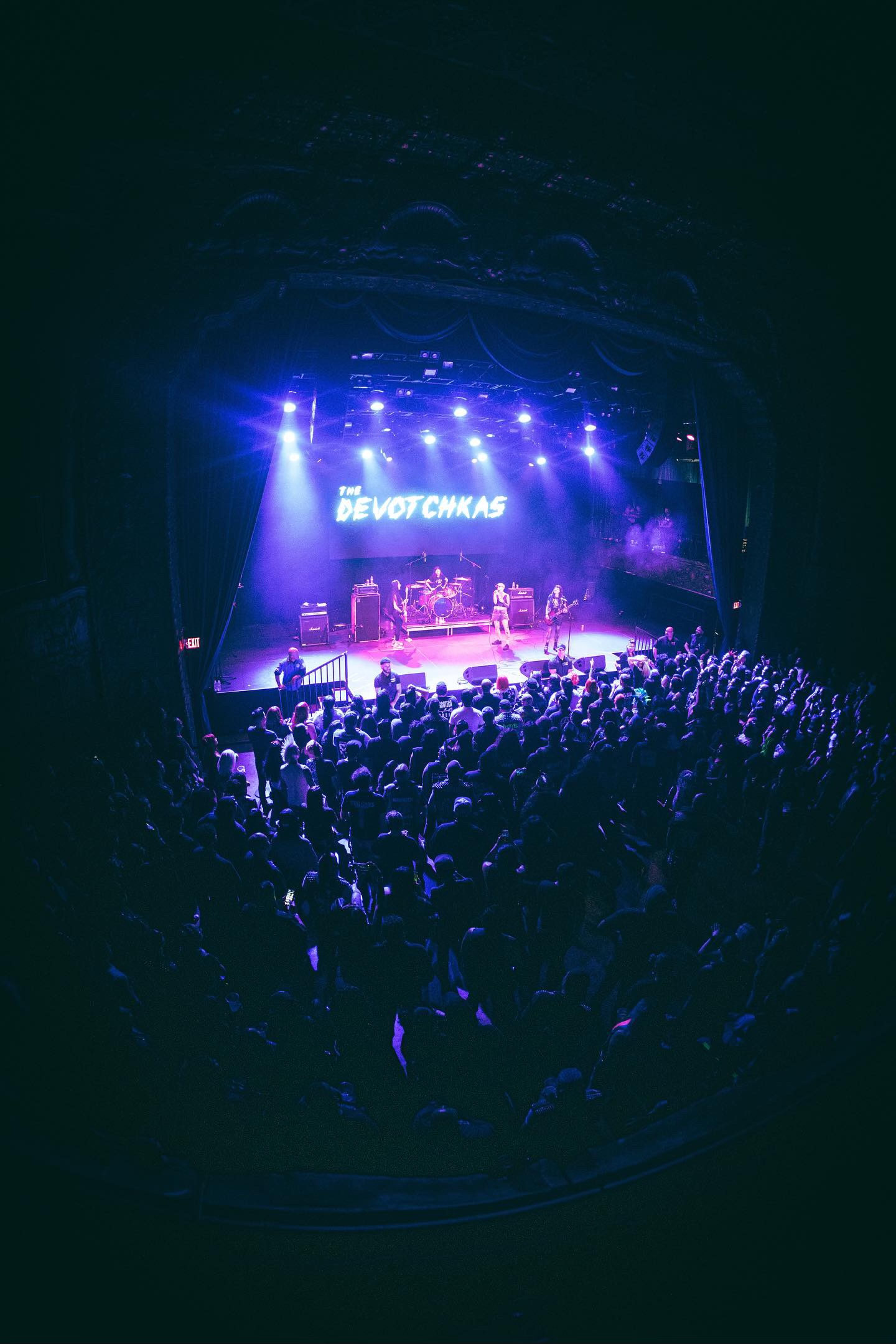
The Devotchkas, CY Fest 2023

The Devotchkas also announced they no longer are associated with previous singer Stephanie in any way, and remain with JJ as the permanent vocalist for the band. The band continues to play periodically for festivals like CY Fest and Rebellion Fest, and release new material despite the members now living in various parts of the country.

== Lineups ==
=== The Devotchkas (current) ===
- JJ – vocals
- Mande – guitar
- Alaine – bass
- Gabrielle – drums

=== The Devotchkas (1999–2001) ===
- Stephanie – vocals
- Mande – guitar
- Alaine – bass
- Gabrielle – drums

=== Early Devotchkas lineup ===
- Steph - vocals
- Mande - guitar
- Alaine - bass
- Jon - drums

== Discography ==
- OiToy - 1998
- Devotchkkas EP - 1998 Punk Core Records
- Annihilation - 2000 Punk Core Records
- Live Fast, Die Young - 2001 Punk Core Records
- From The Vault - 2022 Dig My Grave Records
- Live Fast, Die Young - 2023 limited edition remaster/reissue - Dig My Grave Records
