= The Riffs =

American rock and roll/punk band

- Origin: Portland, Oregon, United States
- Genres: Punk rock, rock and roll
- Labels: Pelado, Vendetta, TKO
- Past members: Toni Transmission

The Riffs are a rock and roll and punk band from Portland, Oregon, United States. They have released three full-length albums, all on indie labels, namely Pelado Records, Vendetta Records, and TKO Records.

== Influences ==
The Riffs are heavily influenced by early punk bands, most notably the Sex Pistols, whose influence can be heard most prominently in the guitars, Sham 69 and the Dead Boys (they paid tribute to the Dead Boys on the cover of "Dead End Dream"). Like other bands that played the first wave of punk music, they were also fans of Protopunk like Eddie and the Hot Rods and The Velvet Underground, as displayed by their cover of "Waiting for My Man" on Underground Kicks.

== Song Content ==
Throughout the first two LPs, Underground Kicks and Dead End Dream, the songs and lyrics (written by all members of the band) tell a bleak story of growing up in the Portland punk scene, presumably in poverty, afflicted with drug addiction, the repercussions of drug abuse, regret about past violent criminal activity, and a "No Way Out" feeling when it came to creating a fulfilling (if any) future.

The band matured for their latest release, Death or Glory, as evident by lead singer Mengis' improved vocal abilities; also, he achieved a greater vocal range, such as in "Death or Glory," smoother production, and implementation of experimental instruments (such as the keyboard in "Poison Boys"). The lyrical content also took a turn for the positive in many ways; Death or Glory had considerably more romantic songs than ever before.

== Members ==
- Tony Mengis - Vocals
- Dogs Body - Guitars and vocals
- Alex Hagen - Guitars and vocals
- Scott Goto - Bass
- Joey O'Brien - Drums

== Past members ==
- Amphetamine Blue - Guitars, backup vocals
- Saigon Shakes - Guitar, then Bass
- Karl - drummer
- Toni Transmission - first drummer

== Discography ==
=== Albums ===
- Underground Kicks (released 1999 by Pelado Records, re-released December 17, 2002 by TKO Records)
- Dead End Dream (March 19, 2002)
- Death or Glory (May 20, 2003)

=== EPs ===
- "The Lucky Ones are Dead" B/W "Johnny Won't Get to Heaven" 7" on Pelado Records
- "White Line Kids" B/W "Kick Time Suicide" 7" released in 2000 on Tombstone Records
- "A Million Scars" B/W "Outta my Mind and I Won't" 7" on Vendetta Records
- "Such a Bore" B/W "Coming Back" 7" on TKO Records
- "Poison Boys" B/W "Lesson Number Nine" 7" released in 2003 on TKO Records
