= Lower Class Brats =

American street punk band

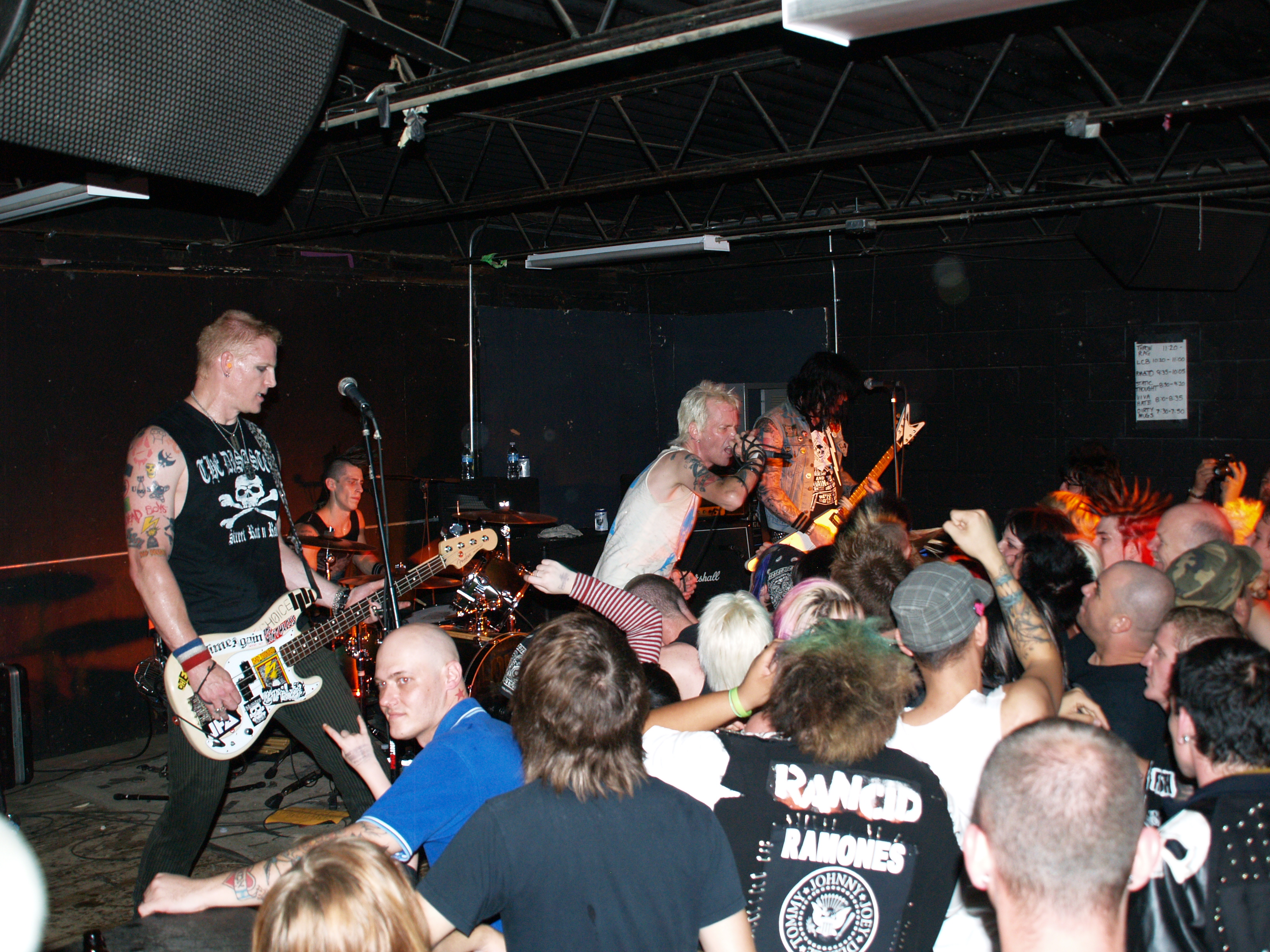

Background information
- Origin: Austin, Texas, U.S.
- Genres: Street punk
- Years active: 1995–present
- Labels: USA •Pair-O-Docs •Second To None •GMM •Punk Core •TKO •Turkey Baster •Loud Punk •Orphan Records Group; ENGLAND •Helen of Oi! FRANCE •Combat Rock •Dirty Punk; SWITZERLAND •T.S.O.R. GERMANY •Randale
- Members: Bones vocals Marty Volume guitar Zed guitar Ron Conflict bass Jorge H. Brat drums
- Past members: Rick Brat; Rob Brat; Clay Aloy; Johnny O. Negative; Houston Richieson; Ryland Meyer; Mike Brat; Brad Teeter; EVO; J.T.K. Punt (Eric Powers); Nick Brat
- Website: lcbarmy.com

Lower Class Brats are an American street punk band founded in Austin, Texas in January 1995, based out of Southern California since 2017. The play a mix of Punk, Oi!, 70s Glam and straight ahead rock and roll.

== Line-up ==
=== Current ===
- Bones: vocals/founding member (1995 – present)
- Marty Volume: guitar/founding member (1995 – present)
- Zed: guitar (2017 – present)
- Ron Conflict: Bass (2012 – present)
- Jorge H. Brat: Drums (2024 – present)

=== Former ===
Bass

- Rick Brat: Bass/founding member (1995–1999, 2000) (Deceased, 2020)
- Houston Richieson: Bass (1999)
- Ryland Meyer: Bass (2000–2002)
- Johnny O. Negative: Bass (2008–2011)
- EVO: Bass (2002–2008, 2011/12)

Drums

- Rob Brat: Drums/founding member (1995–2000)
- Brad Teeter: Drums (2000–2002)
- Mike Brat: Drums (2002–2004) (Deceased, 2024)
- Clay Aloy: Drums (2004–2008)
- J.T.K.: Drums (2008–2013)
- Punt (Eric Powers): (2013–2017)
- Nick Brat: (2017-2024)

Piano

- R.T.: Piano (piano on Rather Be Hated Than Ignored, 1997)
- Tony Scalzo: Piano (piano on The New Seditionaries, 2006)

== Discography ==
=== Demo ===
- Working Class Punk (Self-released cassette tape, 1995) Approx. 200 copies made.

=== 7" records / EPs ===
- Who Writes Your Rules (Helen Of Oi! Records, 1995) English Import. 1,500 pressed. Black vinyl.
- Lower Class Brats / Reducers SF Split (Also known as the Ultra-Violence 7", Pair-O-Docs Records, 1996) 1,000 pressed. 800 black vinyl. 200 white vinyl. With insert.
- A Wrench In The Gear (Helen Of Oi! Records, 1996) English Import. 1,500 pressed. Black vinyl.
- Lower Class Brats / Dead End Cruisers Split (Second to None Records, 1996) 500 pressed. Blue vinyl.
- Lower Class Brats / Templars Split (TKO Records, 1998) 1,500 pressed. 800 black vinyl. 200 orange vinyl. With insert. 500 picture disc.
- Psycho (Combat Rock Records, 1999) French Import. 1,500 pressed. Black vinyl. First 100 copies come with a hand #'d insert with lyrics in French.
- Glam Bastard (TKO Records, 1999) 2,000 pressed. 1,800 black vinyl. With insert. 200 orange vinyl with a hand #'d full-color fold-out poster.
- Deface The Music (Punk Core Records, 2002) 1,000 pressed. 800 black vinyl. 100 purple vinyl. 100 clear vinyl. With insert.
- The Worst (Dirty Punk Records, 2004) French Import. 500 pressed. Green / white splatter vinyl. With insert.
- I'm A Mess (T.S.O.R. Records, 2006) Swiss Import. 500 pressed. Black vinyl. With insert.
- Lower Class Brats / Chelsea Split (TKO Records, 2006) 500 pressed. Green / clear / yellow splatter vinyl. Labels are switched on wrong sides. With insert.
- Thoughts About You (Combat Rock Records, 2009) French Import. 500 pressed. Black vinyl.

=== 12" records / EPs ===
- Punks, Skins, Herberts And Hooligans (Punk Core Records, 1997) 1,000 pressed. Approx. 200 copies were defective and returned to the pressing plant. 200 of the approx. 800 copies left come with a #'d full-color insert. Black vinyl.
- 'Rock 'N' Roll Street Noize (Turkey Baster Records, 2012) 500 pressed. Clear orange vinyl w/ red and black splatter. Includes poster, lyric sheet and download card.

=== Full-length albums / CDs ===
- Rather Be Hated Than Ignored CD (GMM Records, 1997) (Punk Core Records, 2000) Picture Disc LP (Punk Core Records, 2000) 1,000 pressed. #'d sticker on clear plastic cover. With color insert.
- The Plot Sickens CD (Punk Core Records, 2000) LP (Punk Core Records, 2000) 1,000 pressed. 800 black vinyl. 200 gray / green splatter vinyl. With full-color dust sleeve insert.
- A Class Of Our Own CD (Punk Core Records, 2003) LP (Punk Core Records, 2003) 1,000 pressed. 800 black vinyl. 100 half white / half orange vinyl. 100 clear / red splatter vinyl. With full-color dust sleeve insert.
- The New Seditionaires CD (TKO Records, 2006) LP (Dirty Punk Records, 2006) French Import. 1,000 pressed. Black vinyl. With insert.

=== Collections ===
- Primary Reinforcement LP (Combat Rock Records, 1998) French Import. 500 pressed. Contains the first three 7"s. First pressing with black and white cover. Black vinyl. Second pressing with blue and white cover and pink and white FOR EXPORT ONLY sticker on the cover. Black vinyl.
- Real Punk Is An Endangered Species: The Clockwork Singles Collection CD (Punk Core Records, 2003) Contains the first eight 7"s and 12" EP.
- Primary Reinforcement Plus LP (Orphan Records Group/Loud Punk Records, 2017) 1,000 pressed. Contains the first six 7"s. 800 black vinyl, 100 yellow vinyl and 100 Moloko Splatter vinyl. With insert, sticker and poster.

=== Live recordings ===
- Loud And Out Of Tune: Lower Class Brats Live!!! CD (Includes bonus "Live In Seattle" DVD. TKO Records, 2007)

=== DVDs ===
- This Is Real! (Includes bonus CD of The New Seditionaries demos. TKO Records, 2008)

== See also ==
- Music of Austin
