= The Varukers =

British hardcore punk rock band

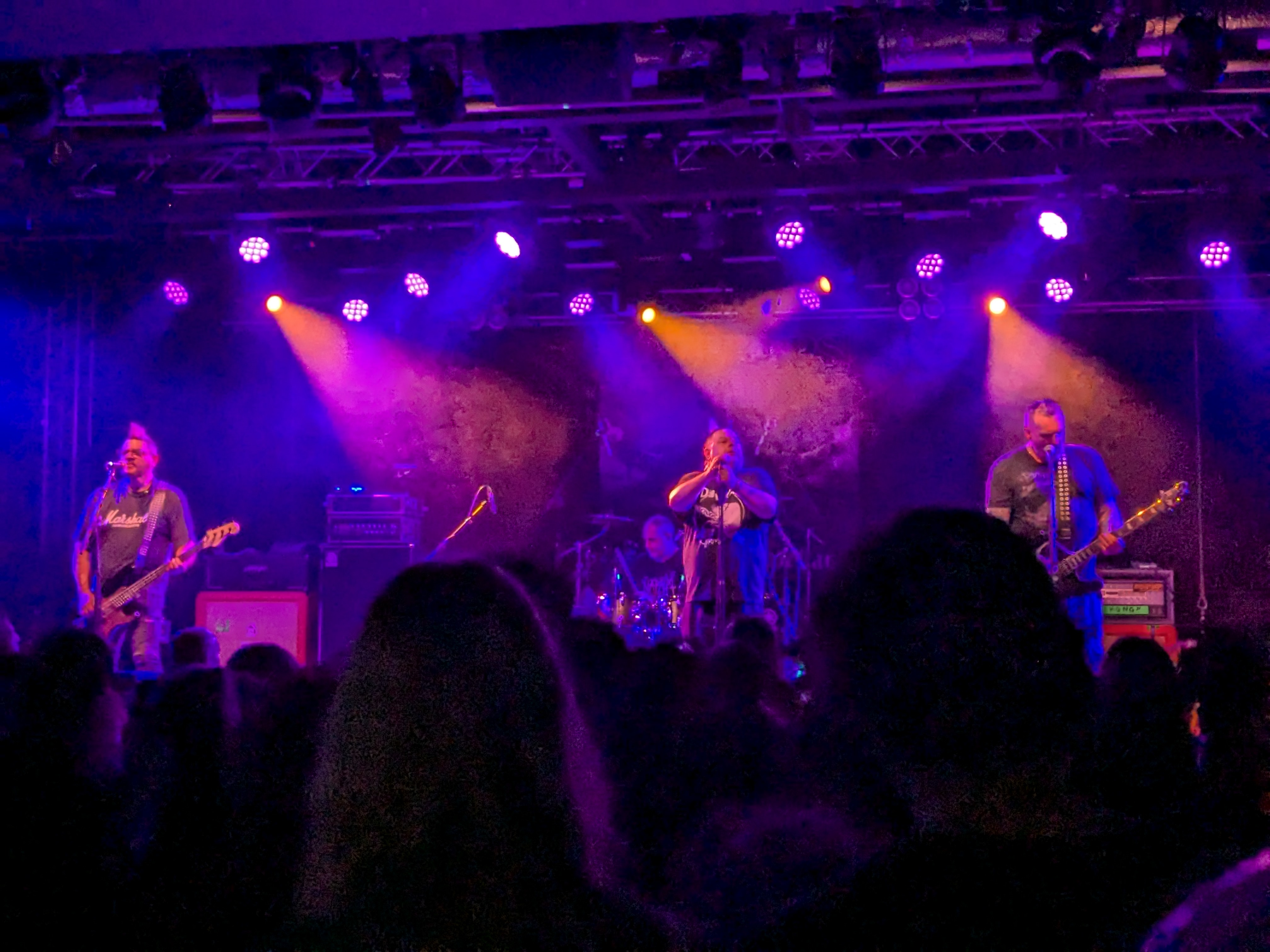
- The Varukers performing in Liverpool in 2026

Background information
- Origin: Leamington Spa, United Kingdom
- Genres: Hardcore punk; punk rock; crust punk; street punk
- Years active: 1979–1988, 1993–present
- Members: Anthony "Rat" Martin; Ian "Biff" Smith; Brian Ansell; Kevin "Kev" Frost
- Past members: Perry Philips; Paul Miles; Graham Kerr; Carl Maxwell; Brian Roe; Bruce Riddell; Garry Maloney; George Jenkins; Sean Duggan; Brik; Andy; Damion; Tom (vomit) Lowe; Stick Dickings

The Varukers are a British punk rock band formed in 1979 by vocalist Anthony "Rat" Martin. They produced their most influential recordings in the early 1980s. The band play in D-beat, the musical style of Discharge. Also like Discharge, the Varukers' lyrics carry an anarchist political ideology.

== History ==
Initially known as the Veruccas, the band altered the spelling of their name to the Varukers to convey more aggression. When recording in the early 1980s, they were part of a broader trend known as "UK 82", second generation punk, or UK hardcore. Bands such as the Varukers, Discharge, Chaos UK, Amebix, the Exploited, and Charged GBH took the existing 1977-era punk sound and melded it with the incessant, heavy drumbeats and "wall of sound" distortion guitar sound of new wave of British heavy metal (NWOBHM) bands such as Motörhead. The new, harder-edged style also tended to use much darker, more nihilistic, and more violent lyrics, and vocals were often shouted rather than sung.

While the Varukers split in 1989, vocalist Rat and guitarist Biff put the band back together in 1991. Stylistically their 1990s-era music resembled the traditional UK82 style. Since the band had former members of Discharge, a D-beat sound developed as time went on. The band has gone through many line-up changes over the years with the only constant member being Rat on vocals while guitarist Biff has been with the band since 1985.

Even with Rat splitting his time between the Varukers and Discharge and Biff splitting his time with Sick on the Bus. The Varukers continue to tour. They shared a headlining spot with such acts as Broken Bones, The Adicts, Vice Squad and GBH at the British Invasion 2k6 concert festival in San Bernardino, California, which ended in rioting.

Guitarist Sean is the former manager of the public house The Olde Angel in Nottingham, United Kingdom.

Journalist and Killing Joke biographer Jyrki "Spider" Hämäläinen directed a documentary about the band that was released 2022.

== Members ==
- Anthony "Rat" Martin - vocals
- Ian "Biff" Smith - guitar, backing vocals
- Brian Ansell - bass, backing vocals
- Kevin Frost - drums

== Discography ==
Chart placings from the UK Independent Chart.

=== Studio albums ===
- Bloodsuckers, LP (1983) - no. 8
- One Struggle, One Fight, LP (1985)
- Prepare for the Attack, LP (1986)
- Murder, LP/CD (1998)
- How Do You Sleep?, LP/CD/Cassette (2000)
- Hellbound, LP/CD (2005)
- Damned and Defiant, LP/CD (2017)

=== EP ===
- Protest and Survive (1981) - no. 31
- I Don't Wanna Be a Victim (1982) - no. 15
- Led to the Slaughter (1984) - no. 24
- Another Religion, Another War (1984) - no. 47
- Massacred Millions (1984) - no. 30
- Nothing Changed (1994)

=== Singles ===
- Die for Your Government (1982) - no. 5
- I Don't Wanna be a Victim! (1982)
- Led To Slaughter (1984)
- No Hope For A Future/ Never Again (1984)
- Another Religion Another War (1984)
- Massacred Millions (1984)
- Humanity (1996)
- Blood Money (2016)
- Die For Your de Government (2017)
- From The Depths (2021)

=== Live Albums ===
- Live In Holland, LP/CD (1985)
- Live In Leeds 1984, LP/CD (1994)
- Killing Myself to Live, CD (2009)
- Noisy Bastards!, LP/CD (2020)
- Live On Crucial Chaos: New York U.S.A, LP (2023)

=== Compilations ===
- Prepare For The Atacks, LP (1986)
- Deadly Games, LP/CD (1989)
- The Punk Singles 1981-1985, LP/CD (1996)
- Still Bollox but Still Here, CD (1995)
- The Retch Files Volume 1, CD (2000)
- Massacred Millions, CD (2001)
- Vintage Varukers - Rare And Unreleased - 1980 - 1985, LP/CD (2001)
- Riot City Years: '83-'84, CD (2004)
- Punk Singles 1981–1985, CD (2005)
- 1980–2005: Collection Of 25 Years, CD (2006)
- No Masters No Slaves, CD (2007)
- Damnation Of Our Species, CD (2011)
- 1984-2000, CD (2013)
- The Varukers , LP EP'7 (2016)
- More Religion - More War (Anniversary Edition) , LP (2019)
- The Demos Anniversary Edition, LP/CD (2019)

=== Video ===
- The Varukers & Casualties* & Glory Stompers* – Live In New York, VHS/PAL (1994)
- Live Protest And Survive, DVD (2005)
- Chaos UK, One Way System, The Varukers – Live At "Berlins" Nottingham 30/8/98, DVD
