= The Casualties =

American hardcore punk band

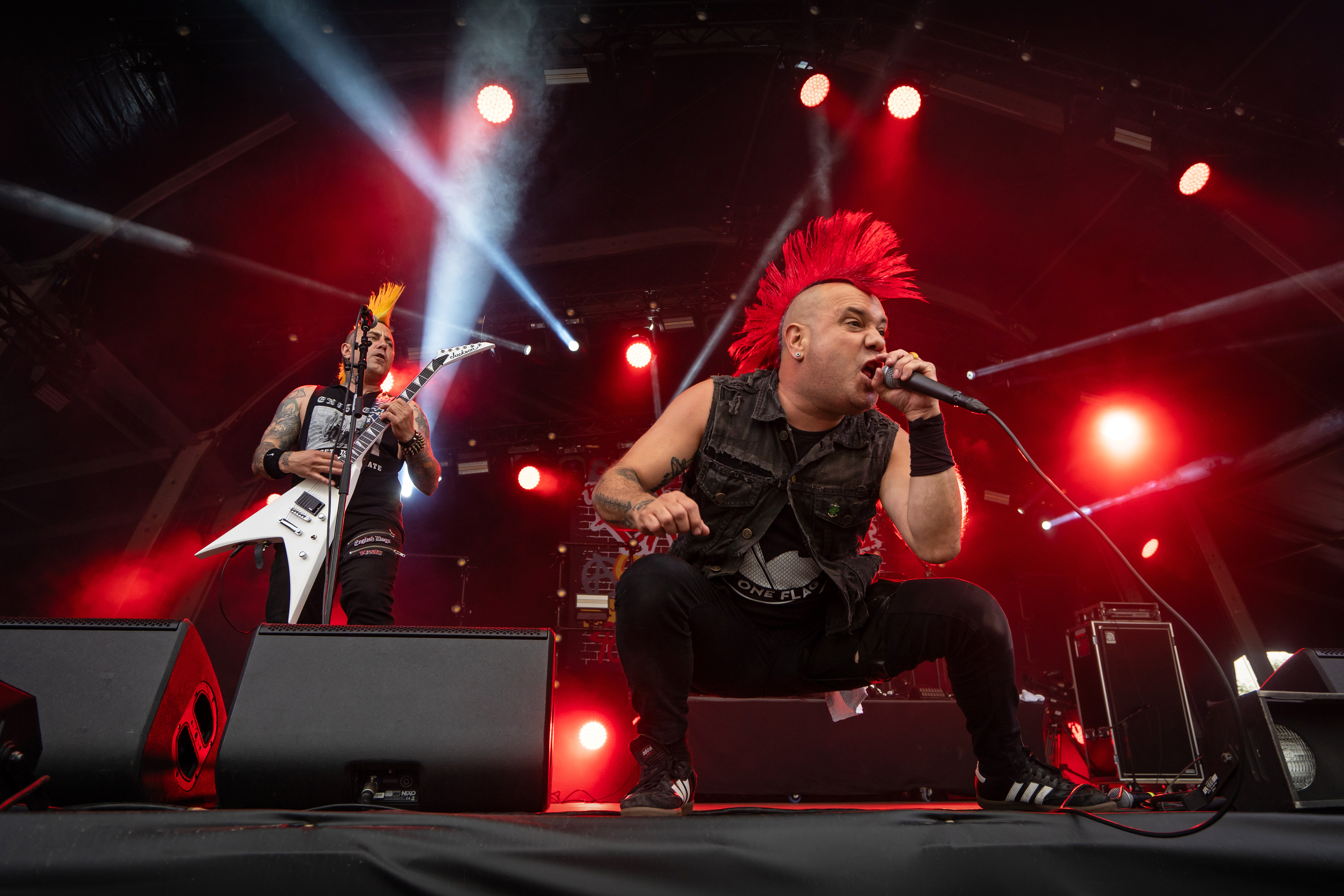
- The Casualties in 2024

Background information
- Origin: New York City, U.S.
- Genres: Punk rock; street punk; hardcore punk
- Years active: 1990–present
- Labels: Season of Mist; Tribal War; SideOneDummy; Cleopatra; Punk Core; Hellcat
- Members: Jake Kolatis; Marc "Meggers" Eggers; David Rodriguez; Doug Wellmon
- Past members: Hank Fischer; Jorge Herrera; Yureesh Hooker; Colin Wolf; Mark Yoshitomi; Fred Backus; Mike Roberts; Shawn; Johnny Rosado; Rick Lopez

The Casualties are an American punk rock band from New York City, founded by vocalist Jorge Herrera, Hank Fischer (guitar), Colin Wolf (vocals), Mark Yoshitomi (bass) and Yureesh Hooker (drums) in 1990. In July 2017, it was announced on the band's Facebook page that original frontman Jorge Herrera had officially retired from touring. As of 2022, the band consists of members Jake Kolatis (guitarist), Marc Meggers (drums), Doug Wellmon (bass), and David Rodriguez (vocals).

== History ==
=== Early years (1990–1998) ===
The Casualties were formed in 1990, with original members Jorge Herrera (vocals), Hank (guitar), Colin Wolf (vocals), Mark Yoshitomi (bass) and Yureesh Hooker (drums). The members aimed to return to what they viewed as the "golden era" of street punk, embodied by bands such as The Exploited and Charged GBH, which they believed had disappeared by 1985. During the early years, the lineup was fluid, with several changes.

In early 1991, Hank left the band and was replaced by Fred Backus on guitar to record Political Sin in March 1991 for the Benefit for Beer compilation. Soon more changes were in the works, with new guitarist Fred heading off to school. C Squat's Scott temporarily filled Fred's shoes until he returned a short time later. During this period, guitarist Hank filled in for a couple of shows, and Steve Distraught also played briefly with the group on second guitar.

The Casualties stabilized long enough to record their first demo in the fall of 1991, and the “40 Oz Casualty” EP in the spring of 1992, and was building up a fan base in their hometown of New York City. At the end of 1992, Mark and Fred left the band and were replaced by Mike Roberts on bass and Jake Kolatis on the guitar, followed by the departure of Yureesh and Colin in 1994, to be replaced on drums by Shawn, while the band went down to a single vocalist. 1994 saw the recording of the four-song EP, Drinking Is Our Way of Life; however, it would not be released. The songs would later appear on the Casualties "The Early Years: 1990-1995" album in 1999. In 1995, the band's second release, the four-track A Fuckin' Way of Life EP was released on Eyeball Records. After recording A Fuckin' Way of Life, Shawn left the band, and Marc Eggers (nicknamed Meggers) of the Rivits became the regular drummer. The line-up of Jorge, Jake, Mike and Meggers continued until 1997.

In 1996 the Casualties became the first American band to appear at the "Holidays in the Sun" Festival in London. 1997 saw the release of the band's debut album For the Punx on Tribal War Records, and the band embarked on its first American tour with The Varukers. Mike (the bassist) left the band in 1998, to be replaced with Johnny Rosado, from The Krays. They released their second LP that year, Underground Army, and began a world tour. Jon left the band during the European leg of the tour, to be temporarily replaced by Dave Punk Core.

=== Later years (1998–2017) ===
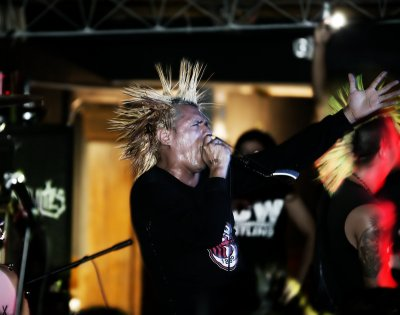
The Casualties in 2006

After the world tour, Dave would be replaced by Rick Lopez from the band Manix. The line-up was now solidified for the band. The end of the millennium, 1999, saw the band produce a compilation album, Early Years 1990–1995, which included tracks which appeared on earlier EPs, as well as never before released songs, such as the four songs they had recorded on the never released EP Drinking Is Our Way of Life back in 1994.

The 2000s have seen the band to continue to tour and produce albums (an album list can be seen below). They have toured with several other bands, such as The Exploited, GBH, Cockney Rejects, Slaughter & the Dogs, and the English Dogs. In December 2009, The Casualties toured alongside Hatebreed, The Acacia Strain, Crowbar, and Thy Will Be Done as part of the Stillborn Fest. In the summer of 2012, The Casualties co-headlined the Tonight We Unite tour along with Nekromantix, where they played For the Punx in its entirety, the first time they had played the album through since its release in 1997. Later that year, The Casualties released their new album titled Resistance through Season of Mist. In 2013, The Casualties played at the largest punk rock festival in the world, the Rebellion Festival in Blackpool, England, where they shared the stage with The Exploited, Special Duties, Chron Gen and Anti-Establishment, and others.

=== Chaos Sound, departure of Herrera, and new member (2016–2022) ===
On January 22, 2016, the band released their tenth studio album titled Chaos Sound. The album was recorded in Orange County, California at Buzzbomb Studio, produced by Paul Miner and released by Season of Mist. It is the last album to feature original vocalist Jorge Herrera.

While no longer associating with The Casualties, there have been no incidents to indicate that there is any bad blood between Herrera and the remaining or current members of The Casualties. Frontman of The Krum Bums, David Rodriguez officially replaced Herrera, changing the band's line-up for the first time in 19 years. Guitarist Jake Kolatis and drummer Meggers are the two remaining long term members of the band.

=== Departure of Rick Lopez, and new member (2022–present) ===
On October 7, 2022, Rick Lopez announced on his Instagram account that he would be taking a "-needed break" and starting a new life, without giving further details about his departure from the band. The Casualties' official account, when consulted by Rick, only limited itself to saying that he was no longer a member of the band. Neither party provided details of his departure but they continue to interact on social media.

On December 1, 2025, the band announced their official signing to Hellcat Records, and a new album to be released in 2026. The new album Detonate released on March 27, 2026, their first album is just over 8 years.

== Members ==
=== Current ===
- Jake Kolatis – guitar (1993–present)
- Marc "Meggers" Eggers – drums (1995–present)
- David Rodriguez – lead vocals (2017–present)
- Doug Wellmon - bass (2022-present)

=== Former ===
- Jorge Herrera – lead vocals (1990–2017)
- Colin Wolf – vocals (1990–1994)
- Hank Fischer – guitar (1990–1991)
- Mark Yoshitomi – bass (1990–1993) guest appearance in 2016
- Yureesh Hooker – drums (1990–1994)
- Fred Backus – guitar (1991–1993)
- Mike Roberts – bass (1993–1997)
- Shawn – drums (1994–1995)
- Johnny Rosado – bass (1997–1998)
- Rick Lopez – bass (1998–2022)

== Discography ==
=== Studio albums ===
- 1997: For the Punx
- 1998: Underground Army
- 2000: Stay Out of Order
- 2001: Die Hards
- 2004: On the Front Line
- 2005: En la Línea del Frente
- 2006: Under Attack
- 2009: We Are All We Have
- 2012: Resistance
- 2016: Chaos Sound
- 2018: Written in Blood
- 2026: Detonate

=== Compilation albums ===
- 2001: The Early Years: 1990–1995
- 2010: For the Casualties Army

=== Live albums ===
- 1999: Live at the Fireside Bowl
- 2003: More at the Fireside Bowl
- 2007: Made in NYC

=== Extended plays ===
- 1992: 40 Oz. Casualty
- 1995: A Fuckin' Way of Life
- 2000: Who's in Control?

=== Appearances on various artists compilations ===
- 1991: Benefit for Beer – "Political Sin"
- 1994 Pogo Attack LP – "25 Years To Late" – "For The Punx"
- 1998: Punx Unite – "Punx Unite"
- 2000: Punx Unite 2 – "Way of Life"
- 2001 Warped Tour 2001 – "Fight For Your Life"
- 2002 Warped Tour 2002 – "Nightmare"
- 2003 The Sound of Rebellion – "Killing Machine" – "Politicians" – "No Rules"
- 2003: Warped Tour 2003 – "Made in N.Y.C."
- 2004: AMP Magazine Presents: Street Punk, Vol. 2 – "Sounds From the Streets"
- 2004: Warped Tour 2004 – "Tomorrow Belongs To Us"
- 2005: Punx Unite-Leaders of Today – "Rebel"
- 2006: Warped Tour 2006 – "Under Attack"
- 2007: Warped Tour 2007 – "In It For Life"
- 2007: Take Action Tour 2007 – "VIP"
- 2010: Warped Tour 2010 – "We Are All We Have"

=== Music videos ===
- 1998: Live at NewCastle Riverside
- 1998: Underground Army World Tour
- 2000: Nightmare
- 2001: Get Off My Back
- 2004: Tomorrow Belongs to Us
- 2006: Can't Stop Us
- 2006: On City Streets
- 2009: War Is Business
- 2009: We Are All We Have
- 2013: My Blood. My Life. Always Forward.
- 2015: Corazones Intoxicados
- 2016: Chaos Sound
- 2016: Running Through the Night
- 2017: Brothers and Sisters
- 2018: 1312
- 2019: Ya Basta
- 2019: Borders
- 2019: Fucking Hate You
- 2020: So Much Hate
- 2021: Demolition
