= Street punk =

Subgenre of punk

- Stylistic origins: Punk rock; oi!; hardcore punk; heavy metal
- Cultural origins: Early 1980s, United Kingdom
- Typical instruments: Singing vocals; electric guitar; electric bass guitar; keyboards; drum kit
- Derivative forms: D-beat

Regional scenes
- United Kingdom

Local scenes
- Birmingham; Leeds

Street punk (sometimes alternatively spelled streetpunk) is an urban working class-based subgenre of punk rock, which emerged as a rebellion against the perceived artistic pretensions of the first wave of British punk. The earliest street punk songs emerged in the late 1970s by bands including Sham 69, the U.K. Subs and Cockney Rejects. By 1982, bands such as Discharge, GBH and the Exploited had pushed this sound to become faster and more abrasive, while also embracing the influence of heavy metal music. In the 1990s and 2000s, a street punk revival began with bands such as the Casualties, Rancid and the Analogs.

== Characteristics ==
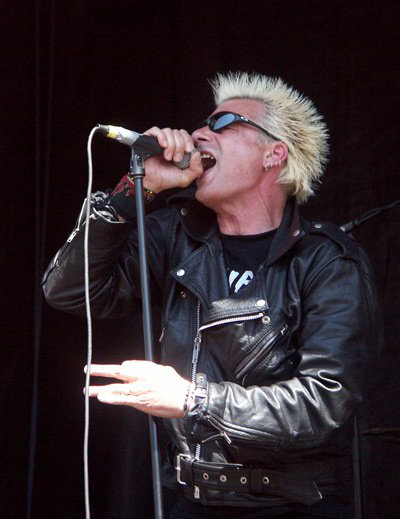
Street punk band GBH on Warped Tour

Street punk lyrics commonly address topics such as fighting, drinking, partying, inner-city turmoil, gang violence, blue-collar issues, union or organized labor issues.

Punk veteran Felix Havoc said:

It was aggressive, yet had melody. As opposed to today's "melodic" punk it still had a lot of energy. It was honest. Hence the term "street punk." There is and was a feel that this was the kids music, from the streets, and was uncorrupted by "professionalism" or "musicianship." As opposed to the anarcho bands its message was more bleak and irreverent. The music was not a-political, just a less intellectual expression of political views of working class youth. The music was marketed as being of and by the working class. I suspect this was not universally the case. Still most middle and upper class kids cringe at frank discussions of violence as evidenced in a typical Blitz song. Early 80's UK punk was catchy as hell; it has sing-a-long choruses and hooky riffs.

== History ==
=== Origins (late 1970s and early 1980s) ===
Street punk grew out of working class young people who disliked the first wave of punk's more artistic nature. The AllMusic guide credits Sham 69 as the band which brought street punk to prominence around 1978–1979, while an article by the i hailed the U.K. Subs and their 1979 debut album Another Kind of Blues as one of the first examples of street punk. Writer Ian Glasper credited the Cockney Rejects 1980 single "Bad Man" as setting a "new standards for what was to become known as street punk" due to its "melodic lead guitar, belligerent vocal delivery and gang backup chants". However, as the sound began to form, it was quickly split between two separate punk scenes: the anarcho-punk scene, which saw the sound as inherently political due to its working class ties; and the oi! scene, which was largely apolitical.

==== UK 82 ====
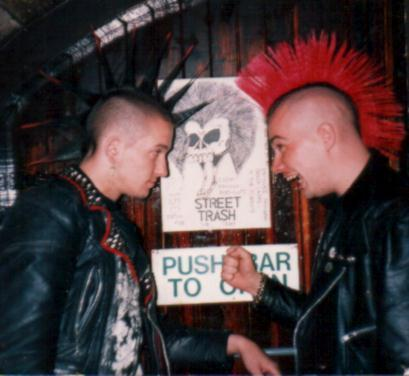
1980s-era punks

UK 82 (or UK hardcore) is a style of street punk which pushed the genre's tempos faster and embraced the influence of heavy metal music, particularly new wave of British heavy metal bands like Motörhead and Iron Maiden. The term UK 82 is taken from the title of a song by the Exploited.

The three most prominent UK82 acts were the Exploited, Discharge and GBH. The Exploited were controversial due to their aggressive lyrics and rowdy concerts, and were considered by Glasper to be "cartoon punks". Glasper wrote: "For many, The Exploited were the quintessential second wave punk band with their senses-searing high-speed outbursts against the system, and wild-eyed frontman Walter 'Wattie' Buchan's archetypal orange mohican." Discharge's early work proved to be enormously influential, providing the blueprint for an entire subgenre. Their later work, however, has been described as moving into heavy metal.

The lyrics of UK 82 bands tended to be much darker and more violent than the lyrics of earlier punk bands. They tended to focus on the possibilities of a nuclear holocaust, and other apocalyptic themes, partially due to the military tension of the Cold War atmosphere. The other mainstay of the lyrics of the era was unemployment, and the policies of the Conservative Party government. Lyrics frequently denounced the Conservative leader Margaret Thatcher.

==== D-beat ====
D-beat (also known as Discore or käng (boot), in Sweden) was developed in the early 1980s by imitators of the band Discharge, for whom the genre is named. The first such group was the Varukers. The vocal content of D-beat tends towards shouted slogans. The style is distinct from its predecessors by its minimal lyrical content and greater proximity to heavy metal. It is closely associated with crust punk, which is a heavier, more complex variation. D-beat bands typically have anti-war, anarchist messages and closely follow the bleak nuclear war imagery of 1980s anarcho-punk bands. The style was particularly popular in Sweden, and was developed there by groups such as Anti Cimex and Mob 47.

=== Revival (1990s and 2000s) ===
In the 1990s, a new era of street punk began with emerging street punk bands like the Casualties and Rancid, The Casualties became one of the most well-known street punk bands and achieved underground success. Their 2004 album On the Front Line peaked at number 8 on the Independent Albums chart. On the Front Line and the Casualties' 2006 album Under Attack peaked at numbers 7 and 9 on the Heatseekers Albums chart, respectively.

The 1990s also saw the spread of street punk to other countries, particularly Eastern European states that were previously behind the Iron Curtain. The Analogs, a group from Szczecin formed in 1995, gradually became one of the most active punk bands in Poland; with roots in the antifascist Oi! scene, The Analogs are widely considered to be precursors of street punk in the country and are credited with popularising the genre there. Their influence has spread to other countries in the region, as Mister X (started in 2003) – leaders of the street punk scene in Belarus – have often cited The Analogs as one of their main inspirations.

International outfit Booze & Glory, originating from the Polish migrant punk scene in London, was formed in 2009. Playing punk rock, especially Oi! and street punk, they grew popular worldwide and have performed concerts selling thousands of tickets in Indonesia, where the hardcore punk scene is lively and growing.

== See also ==
- Clockwork Orange punks
- List of street punk bands
- Oi!

== Bibliography ==
- Glasper, Ian (2004). Burning Britain: The History of UK Punk 1980–1984. Cherry Red Books. ISBN 1-901447-24-3.
- Glasper, Ian (2006). The Day the Country Died: A History of Anarcho Punk 1980 to 1984. Cherry Red Books. ISBN 1-901447-70-7.
- Jandreus, Peter (2008). The Encyclopedia of Swedish Punk 1977–1987. Stockholm: Premium Publishing.
