= BYO Records discography =

- The BYO logo
- Studio albums: 85
- Extended plays: 2
- Live albums: 1
- Compilation albums: 13
- Singles: 15
- Video albums: 1
- Box sets: 1

The discography of BYO Records, an independent record label based in Los Angeles, consists of 118 releases: 85 studio albums, one live album, 13 compilation albums, 2 EPs, 15 singles, one video album, and one box set.

BYO (Better Youth Organization) Records was started in 1982 by brothers Shawn and Mark Stern of the band Youth Brigade. The label's first release was the compilation album Someone Got Their Head Kicked In!, showcasing a number of Los Angeles punk rock acts. This was followed by Youth Brigade's debut album Sound & Fury, released in limited numbers and re-recorded the following year with a different track list. Over the next few years the label released albums by notable acts including 7 Seconds, SNFU, and Jr. Gone Wild.

The label was inactive from 1988-1990. It was revived in 1991 in conjunction with the Sterns' new act Royal Crown Revue and the revival of Youth Brigade. During the punk rock revival of the 1990s BYO released albums by Jughead's Revenge, The Bouncing Souls, Automatic 7, Hepcat, 22 Jacks, Terrorgruppe, Pezz, Jon Cougar Concentration Camp, and others. The BYO Split Series was launched in 1999, a series of split albums featuring two bands per release; it lasted until 2004 and comprised five albums.

Since 2000 BYO has released albums by Pistol Grip, Manic Hispanic, Filthy Thieving Bastards, The Unseen, Sixer, One Man Army, Consumed, Throw Rag, The Business, The Briefs, Clit 45, A Global Threat, Wednesday Night Heroes, and others. In 2009 the label celebrated its (approximate) 25th anniversary with the release of Let Them Know: The Story of Youth Brigade and BYO Records, a box set chronicling the label's history in a coffee table book, a documentary film on DVD, and a compilation album on both CD and double LP of bands covering songs from the BYO catalog.

== Releases ==
Year	Artist	Title	Format	Type	Catalog
1982	various artists	Someone Got Their Head Kicked In!	LP	compilation album	BYO 001
1982	Youth Brigade	Sound & Fury (1982)	LP	studio album	BYO 002
1983	Youth Brigade	Sound & Fury (1983)	LP	studio album	BYO 002R
1994	Youth Brigade	Sink with Kalifornija	CD	compilation album	BYO 002
1984	various artists	Something to Believe In	LP	compilation album	BYO 004
1984	7 Seconds	The Crew	LP, CS, CD	studio album	BYO 005
1984	Youth Brigade	"What Price Happiness?"	7"	single	BYO 006
1984	Stretch Marks	What D'Ya See?	LP	studio album	BYO 007
1984	Unwanted	Shattered Silence	LP	studio album	BYO 008
1985	SNFU	...And No One Else Wanted to Play	LP, CS, CD	studio album	BYO 009
1985	7 Seconds	Walk Together, Rock Together	LP, CS, CD	EP	BYO 010
1985	Upright Citizens	Open Eyes, Open Ears, Brains to Think & a Mouth to Speak	LP, CS	studio album	BYO 011
1986	The Brigade	The Dividing Line	LP, CS	studio album	BYO 012
1986	The Smarties	Whole Buncho Weirdos	LP, CS	studio album	BYO 013
1986	7 Seconds	New Wind	LP, CS, CD	studio album	BYO 014
1986	Hungry for What	The Shattered Dream	LP, CS	studio album	BYO 015
1986	Jr. Gone Wild	Less Art, More Pop!	LP, CS	studio album	BYO 016
1986	SNFU	If You Swear, You'll Catch No Fish	LP, CS, CD	studio album	BYO 017
1986	The Brigade	Come Together	EP, CS	EP	BYO 018
1987	Mad Parade	A Thousand Words	LP, CS	studio album	BYO 019
1987	Scram	Stand Up	LP, CS	studio album	BYO 020
1987	Wonderwall	Blueprint	LP	studio album	BYO 021
1992	Royal Crown Revue	"Hey Santa!"	CD	single	BYO 022
1992	Royal Crown Revue	Kings of Gangster Bop	LP, CS, CD	studio album	BYO 023
1991	That's It!	Really?	LP, CS, CD	studio album	BYO 024
1992	Youth Brigade	Come Again	EP, CS, CD	EP	BYO 025
1993	various artists	Someone's Gonna Get Their Head to Believe in Something	CD	compilation album	BYO 026
1994	Youth Brigade	Happy Hour	LP, CS, CD	studio album	BYO 027
1994	Jughead's Revenge	Elimination	LP, CS, CD	studio album	BYO 028
1994	Youth Brigade	"All Style, No Substance"	7"	single	BYO 029
1993	Jughead's Revenge	It's Lonely at the Bottom/Unstuck in Time	CD	compilation album	BYO 030
1994	The Bouncing Souls	The Good, the Bad, and the Argyle	LP, CS, CD	compilation album	BYO 031
1995	Hagfish	"Minit Maid"	7"	single	BYO 032
1995	Youth Brigade / Screw 32	"Spies for Life" / "Blind Spot"	7"	split single	BYO 033
1995	Jughead's Revenge	13 Kiddie Favorites	LP, CS, CD	studio album	BYO 034
1995	Automatic 7	Automatic 7	LP, CS, CD	studio album	BYO 035
1995	The Bouncing Souls	"The Ballad of Johnny X"	7"	single	BYO 036
1995	The Bouncing Souls	Maniacal Laughter	LP, CS, CD	studio album	BYO 037
1996	Youth Brigade	To Sell the Truth	LP, CS, CD	studio album	BYO 038
1996	Hepcat	"Bobby & Joe"	7"	single	BYO 039
1996	Hepcat	Scientific	LP, CS, CD	studio album	BYO 040
1996	22 Jacks	"Swallow"	7"	single	BYO 041
1997	Terrorgruppe	Uber Amerika	CD	studio album	BYO 042
1997	Brand New Unit	Looking Back Again	CD	studio album	BYO 043
1997	Pinhead Circus	Detailed Instructions for the Self Involved	LP, CS, CD	studio album	BYO 044
1997	various artists	Sample This!	CD	compilation album	BYO 045
1997	Pezz	One Last Look...	LP, CS, CD	studio album	BYO 046
1997	various artists	Sociedad = Sucidad	CD, CS	compilation album	BYO 047
1997	Jon Cougar Concentration Camp	'Til Niagara Falls...	LP, CS, CD	studio album	BYO 048
1997	Four Letter Word	A Nasty Piece of Work	LP, CS, CD	studio album	BYO 049
1998	Youth Brigade	Out of Print	CD	compilation album	BYO 050
1998	Johnny X and the Conspiracy	"Buy, Sell, Trade"	7"	single	BYO 051
1998	Damnation	"Beelze Bubblegum"	7"	single	BYO 052
1998	Jon Cougar Concentration Camp	"8 West"	7"	single	BYO 053
1998	Four Letter Word	"Do You Feel Lucky Punk?"	7"	single	BYO 054
1998	NRA	"Bunk"	7"	single	BYO 055
1998	Pinhead Circus	"Hallmark"	7"	single	BYO 056
1998	Jon Cougar Concentration Camp	Melon	LP, CD	studio album	BYO 057
1998	various artists	Of Things to Come	CD	compilation album	BYO 058
1999	Pinhead Circus	Everything Else Is a Far Gone Conclusion	LP, CD	studio album	BYO 059
1999	Leatherface / Hot Water Music	BYO Split Series Volume I	LP, CD	split album	BYO 060
1999	Pezz	Warmth and Sincerity	LP, CD	studio album	BYO 061
1999	Four Letter Word	Zero Visibility (Experiments with Truth)	CD	studio album	BYO 062
1999	Leatherface	Cherry Knowle	CD	studio album	BYO 063
1999	Jon Cougar Concentration Camp	Hot Shit	CD	studio album	BYO 064
1999	Swingin' Utters / Youth Brigade	BYO Split Series Volume II	LP, CD	split album	BYO 065
1999	various artists	Greetings from the Welfare State	CD	compilation album	BYO 066
2000	Cadillac Tramps	Live!	CD	live album	BYO 067
2000	Leatherface	Horsebox	LP, CD	studio album	BYO 068
1999	Welt	Broke Down	CD	studio album	BYO 069
2001	Leatherface	The Last	CD	studio album	BYO 070
2001	Me First and the Gimme Gimmes	Shannon	7"	single	BYO 071
2001	Pinhead Circus	The Black Power of Romance	CD	studio album	BYO 072
2001	Pistol Grip	The Shots from the Kalico Rose	LP, CD	studio album	BYO 073
2001	Welt	Brand New Dream	CD	studio album	BYO 074
2001	Manic Hispanic	The Recline of Mexican Civilization	CD	studio album	BYO 075
2001	Filthy Thieving Bastards	A Melody of Retreads and Broken Quills	LP, CD	studio album	BYO076
2001	The Unseen	The Anger and the Truth	LP, CD	studio album	BYO 077
2001	Kosher	Self Control	LP, CD	studio album	BYO 078
2002	NOFX / Rancid	BYO Split Series Volume III	LP, CD	split album	BYO 079N
2002	NOFX / Rancid	BYO Split Series Volume III	LP, CD	split album	BYO 079R
2002	Manifesto Jukebox	Remedy	LP, CD	studio album	BYO 080
2002	various artists	Sample This, Too!	CD	compilation album	BYO 081
2002	Sixer	Beautiful Trash	CD	studio album	BYO 082
2002	The Forgotten	Control Me	LP, CD	studio album	BYO 083
2002	The Bouncing Souls / Anti-Flag	BYO Split Series Volume IV	LP, CD	split album	BYO 084
2002	One Man Army	Rumors and Headlines	LP, CD	studio album	BYO 085
2003	Manic Hispanic	Mijo Goes to Jr. College	CD	studio album	BYO 086
2003	Consumed	Pistols at Dawn	CD	studio album	BYO 087
2003	Pistol Grip	Another Round	LP, CD	studio album	BYO 088
2003	The Forgotten	Out of Print	CD	compilation album	BYO 089
2003	The Unseen	Explode	LP, CD	studio album	BYO 090
2003	Throw Rag	Desert Shores	LP, CD	studio album	BYO 091
2003	The Business	Hardcore Hooligan	CD	studio album	BYO 092
2003	Manic Hispanic	(The Menudo Incident)	CD	studio album	BYO 092
2004	Leatherface	Dog Disco	LP, CD	studio album	BYO 094
2004	Jackass	Plastic Jesus	CD	studio album	BYO 095
2004	Alkaline Trio / One Man Army	BYO Split Series Volume V	LP, CD	split album	BYO 096
2004	The Briefs	Sex Objects	LP, CD	studio album	BYO 098
2004	Pistol Grip	Tear It All Down!	CD	studio album	BYO 099
2004	The Briefs	Hit After Hit	CD	studio album	BYO 100
2004	The Briefs	Off the Charts	CD	studio album	BYO 101
2005	Clit 45	Self-Hate Crimes	CD	studio album	BYO 102
2005	Manic Hispanic	Grupo Sexo	CD	studio album	BYO 103
2005	Throw Rag	13 ft. and Rising	LP, CD	studio album	BYO 104
2005	Shark Soup	Fatlip Showbox	CD	studio album	BYO 105
2002	Last Target	One Shot, One Kill	CD	studio album	BYO 106
2005	The Briefs	Steal Yer Heart	LP, CD	studio album	BYO 107
2005	Filthy Thieving Bastards	My Pappy Was a Pistol	LP, CD	studio album	BYO 108
2006	A Global Threat	Where the Sun Never Sets	CD	studio album	BYO 109
2006	Clit 45	2, 4, 6, 8...We're the Kids You Love to Hate	CD	studio album	BYO 110
2007	Filthy Thieving Bastards	...I'm a Son of a Gun	CD	studio album	BYO 111
2007	Nothington	All In	CD	studio album	BYO 112
2007	Clorox Girls	J'aime les Filles	LP, CD	studio album	BYO 113
2007	Wednesday Night Heroes	Guilty Pleasures	LP, CD	studio album	BYO 114
2007	The Briefs	The Greatest Story Ever Told	DVD/CD	video album	BYO 115
2009	Nothington	Roads, Bridges & Ruins	LP, CD	studio album	BYO 116
2009	various artists	Let Them Know: The Story of Youth Brigade and BYO Records	LP/CD/DVD	box set	BYO 125
