= Let Them Know: The Story of Youth Brigade and BYO Records =

Compilation album by BYO Records
- Released: September 22, 2009
- Genre: Punk rock
- Label: BYO

Let Them Know: The Story of Youth Brigade and BYO Records is a box set put together by BYO Records in honor of their 25th anniversary. It consists of a book documenting the history of the label as well as a DVD with a documentary and a CD consisting of 31 different artists covering songs that have appeared on BYO releases.

== Track listing ==
Original performers indicated in parentheses
No.	Title	Artist	Length
1.	"Young 'Til I Die" (7 Seconds)	The Bouncing Souls
2.	"Headlights...Ditch!" (The Bouncing Souls)	Off with Their Heads
3.	"No More Lies" (Battalion of Saints)	NOFX
4.	"Misfortune" (SNFU)	Youth Brigade
5.	"S.O.S." (One Man Army)	Lagwagon
6.	"Believe in Something" (Youth Brigade)	Blue Collar Special
7.	"Future Dreams" (Upright Citizens)	The Cute Lepers
8.	"Domination" (Youth Youth Youth)	Young Governor and Marvelous Mark
9.	"Wrecking Crew" (The Adolescents)	Pulley
10.	"We're Gonna Fight" (7 Seconds)	Pennywise
11.	"It's Empty" (One Man Army)	Filthy Thieving Bastards
12.	"Dead and Broken" (Alkaline Trio)	American Steel
13.	"The Ballad of Johnny X" (The Bouncing Souls)	Johnny Madcap and the Distractions
14.	"Little White God" (Leatherface)	In the Red
15.	"Fade Away" (Pegboy)	Shark Soup
16.	"Fight to Unite" (Youth Brigade)	Dropkick Murphys
17.	"Foreign Policy" (The Stretch Marks)	Wednesday Night Heroes
18.	"1000 Miles" (The Unseen)	Anti-Flag
19.	"Victoria" (One Man Army)	Complete Control
20.	"We're In!" (Youth Brigade)	Old Man Markley
21.	"Keep On" (Hepcat)	The Ignorant
22.	"Piss on You" (Personality Crisis)	Subhumans
23.	"Scratches and Needles" (The Nils)	CH3
24.	"Pill Box" (The Joneses)	Lower Class Brats
25.	"Who Is Who" (The Adolescents)	The Briefs
26.	"Hating Every Minute" (Alkaline Trio)	Krum Bums
27.	"In the Night" (Bad Religion)	Ashers
28.	"I Scream" (The Brigade)	Matt Skiba
29.	"All the Way" (One Man Army)	Nothington
30.	"Doublewhiskeycokenoice" (Dillinger Four)	Leatherface
31.	"Sink with California" (Youth Brigade)	7 Seconds
