= Kosher (disambiguation) =

Kosher is food that may be consumed according to kashrut, or Jewish dietary laws.

Kosher may also refer to:

- Kosher (band), an American punk rock band formed in 1995 in Warrensburg, Missouri
- Kosher Gym, a fitness club on Coney Island Avenue in the Midwood section of Flatbush, Brooklyn

== See also ==
- Chametz, the dietary laws of Passover
- Koshur
