= Mush =

Mush, MUSH, or Mushing may refer to:

== Common meanings ==
- Mush (cornmeal), a kind of corn pudding or porridge
- Mushing, a sport or transport method powered by dogs or a command to a dog team
- Psilocybin mushroom, a mushroom used as a recreational drug

== Places and jurisdictions ==
- Muş Province, in eastern Anatolia (Asian Turkey)
  - Muş, a town and the capital of Muş Province, transliterated as "Mush", former bishopric and present Armenian Catholic titular see

== People ==
=== Nickname ===
- Mushtaq Ahmed (cricketer, born 1970), Pakistani former cricketer
- Mushaga Bakenga (born 1992), Norwegian footballer of Congolese descent
- Mush Crawford (1898-1966), American National Football League player
- R. V. Kerr (1891-1960), American collegiate football player and educator
- Mush March (1908-2002), Canadian National Hockey League player
- Dudley W. Morton (1907-1943), US Navy World War II submarine commander
- Pervez Musharraf (born 1943), former president of Pakistan sometimes referred to as "Mush"
- William Riley (criminal) (fl. 1870–1878), American businessman, saloon keeper and underworld figure in Manhattan, New York

=== Surname ===
- John Mush (1551/52-1612/13), English Roman Catholic priest

== Music ==
- Mush (album), a 1991 album by the band Leatherface
- Mush Records, a Los Angeles-based independent record label

== Internet and technology ==
- MUSH, a type of text-based online social medium (often called a "Multi-User Shared Hallucination")
- Mush (computer game), a browser game from Motion Twin

== Other uses ==
- Kneading (cats) (also called "mushing"), a behavior of domestic cats when they are content or are preparing to settle for a nap
