= The Sun Never Sets =

The empire on which the sun never sets is a term for particular global empires, the idea being that they were so extensive that there was always at least one part of their territory in daylight.

The Sun Never Sets may also refer to:

- The Sun Never Sets (1939 film), a film starring Basil Rathbone
- The Sun Never Sets (2026 film), a film starring Dakota Fanning
- The Sun Never Sets (TV series), a 2000 Japanese television series
- The Sun Never Sets (album), a 2005 album by Australian band The Herd

== See also ==
- A Sun That Never Sets
- The Sun Will Never Set
- Where the Sun Never Sets
