= The Kids Will Revolt =

EP by A Global Threat
- Released: 1997
- Recorded: December 10, 1997
- Genre: Punk
- Label: Crack Rock Records, ADD Records

A Global Threat chronology
The Kids Will Revolt (1997)	What The Fuck Will Change? (1998)

"The Kids Will Revolt" (also alternatively known as The Kids Will Revolt Against All Authority) is the first release from A Global Threat. It was first released on 7" vinyl by Crack Rock Records in 1997. It was later re-pressed on Mark Unseen's label A.D.D. Records. Crack Rock Records re-released the tracks here along with the tracks from General Strike's self-titled EP on one CD entitled The Kids Will Revolt Against All Authority in 2007.

A different version of "The Way It Is" appears on the Until We Die CD.

Different versions of the tracks "American Culture", "This Town", "Kids Will Revolt" and "Conformity" appear on the expanded What The Fuck Will Change? CD as outtakes from the Until We Die sessions.

== Track listing ==
Side A

1. "The Way It Is"
2. "American Culture"
3. "This Town"

Side B

1. "A Global Threat"
2. "The Maine Punx"
3. "Kids Will Revolt"
4. "Conformity"

== Line up for recording ==
- Bryan - vocals
- Westie - guitar
- Brett Threat - bass guitar
- Tubby Tim - drums
