= Pistols at Dawn =

Pistols at Dawn may refer to:

- Pistols at Dawn, a 2000 album by Cauda Pavonis
- Pistols at Dawn (EP), a 2004 EP by Aqueduct
- Pistols at Dawn (Consumed album)
- "Pistols at Dawn" (A Remarkable Place to Die), a 2026 television episode

== See also ==
- Duel
