= A Global Threat =

American punk rock band

- Origin: Bangor, Maine, U.S.
- Genre: Street punk
- Years active: 1997–2007 , 2013, 2016–2019
- Labels: Crack Rock Records; ADD Records; Step 1 Music; GMM Records; Rodent Popsicle Records; BYO Records; Punkcore Records
- Members: Bryan Lothian; John Curran; Mike Graves
- Past members: Gabe Crate; Pete Curtis; Josiah Steinbrick; Mark Civitarese; Johnny Thayer; Tubby Tim Webber; Brett Threat; Scott "Westie" Webber; Rufio

A Global Threat (AGT) was an American punk rock band, formed in Bangor, Maine in 1997. They released four full-length albums as well as many 7-inch EPs and toured extensively throughout the United States.

== History ==
=== 1997–2000 ===
Originally formed in Maine in 1997, the band relocated to Boston, Massachusetts in 1998 where it was based until their breakup. The band's original members were Bryan Lothian, Brett Threat, Westie, and Tubby Tim. In 1998 the band recorded and self-released their first EP, The Kids Will Revolt Against All Authority, on Crack Rock Records. Soon after, Mike Graves and Petrov Curtis joined the band (on drums and guitar respectively) and they began playing live shows in Boston and New York. During this period, the band met Mark Civitarese (a member of Boston punk group The Unseen), who would become a major supporter of the band before later joining it himself. Mark re-released The Kids Will Revolt EP on ADD Records in late 1998. He then became a member of AGT in 1999 and took up dual vocal duties, with both him and Bryan singing during live shows.

In 1999, they released the What the Fuck Will Change? EP as well as a split 7-inch EP with Broken. Both these releases saw the band progressing towards the more frantic and relentless streetpunk style for which they would later become well-known. What the Fuck Will Change? was later re-released as the band's first full-length LP on Step-1 Music, including new material as well as re-recorded songs from The Kids EP. During this time, Johnny joined the band on rhythm guitar and AGT embarked on a tour of the U.S. East Coast and South. Unfortunately, the band was involved in a three-car accident in Austin, Texas, forcing them to cancel the remaining dates of the tour. 1999 also saw the release of the Who's to Blame? split 7-inch EP with now defunct Rochester, New York band The End on Anarchist Records/ADD Records.

Shortly thereafter, AGT secured a record deal with GMM records because Mark Noah had seen them play in Chapel Hill, NC with Patriot. That winter after a weekend of shows, original member Brett Threat was fired from the band and would subsequently move back to Maine and form the punk band USA Waste. The band then played a few shows with Johnny on bass, before he too was released from the band and went on to form USA Waste with Brett. AGT then recruited long-time friend and previous musical collaborator Gabe Crate (a.k.a. Gabe Asturd) to join the group on bass. Having now secured a more musically solid lineup they hit the studio to record their second full-length "Until We Die". In November, Mark Civitarese, also known as Mark Unseen, played his last show with AGT and left due to being in two bands.

=== 2000–2007 ===
In 2000, the band set out on an East Coast tour with the short-lived Boston-based hardcore band The Statistics. However, The Statistics left the tour after only two shows, leaving AGT to finish the remaining dates on their own. The band also recorded the In The Red EP this year, and Until We Die was released on GMM Records. The band also set out on its first national tour with Awkward Thought. This tour was also joined, at points, by The Krays, Truents, Toxic Narcotic, and The Flatliners (Tx).

Shortly after the tour, Gabe was fired from the band. In 2001, AGT carried on as a three-piece with Pete on bass, Mike on drums, and Bryan on guitar and vocals, playing a handful of shows in Massachusetts and New York City. The band also recorded a split 7-inch with Toxic Narcotic before touring with The Casualties. For this tour, John Curran, who went on to form the L.A. 'shitgaze' band Kiss Me Deadly in 2009, joined the band as the new bassist and Pete returned to guitar. In December, AGT recorded their 3rd full-length LP Here We Are, which was released on Punkcore Records. During this time, Bryan began playing guitar as Pete Curtis prepared to leave the band and move to L.A. Around this time, Pete Curtis and former member Gabe Crate, coincidentally also about to leave the Boston area, became involved in a violent altercation with one another at a party, during which Gabe called into question Pete's punk rock credibility, allegedly inspiring the lyrics for a future bonus track entitled "D.F." written by Pete about Gabe's own shortcomings.

In 2001, Pete played his last show as a full-time member with the band before leaving for L.A., apparently becoming emotionally overwhelmed during the show and openly weeping. Pete, however, would rejoin the band several times in the future, rendering his tears on this occasion entirely superfluous. What the Fuck Will Change? was also re-released this year on Punkcore Records. 2002 also saw the band embark on another U.S. tour with The Casualties, as well as a U.S. tour with Defiance, for which Pete rejoined the band.

In winter and spring of 2003, the band toured the west coast and north east with Clit 45. Also that spring the "Earache/Pass the time" EP was released. For the summer AGT would tour the U.S. with F-minus.

In 2004–2005 AGT continued to play shows, toured the US with Casualties and then the Unseen and Career Soldiers, began work on new musical material and also searched for a new record label. They eventually landed with BYO Records.

In 2006, the band recorded what would become their final record, Where the Sun Never Sets on BYO Records. Many consider this album to be the band's most musically complex and innovative achievement, while also maintaining the original political and musical aggressiveness for which the band has always been known and respected.

In support of the release, A Global Threat would tour southern California, then the East Coast with Strike Anywhere, the Subhumans across the Midwest US, followed by their first full Canadian tour joined in part by the Wednesday Night Heroes. They would then tour the US again with Strike Anywhere, Bane, This is Hell, Ignite and Modern Life is War for the remainder of the summer and then returned to Canada for another tour with the Wednesday Night Heroes and The Filthy.

In winter 2007 they would tour southern California and Arizona with LCB, Monster Squad and Career Soldiers. Then A Global Threat completed a U.S. tour with The Casualties before headlining another US tour with Wednesday Night Heroes and Monster Squad. Mike O'Brien of Clit 45 played guitar on the first tour of the summer, while another replacement, Ben, took over the guitar on the second tour.

That summer tour would be their last, taking the stage for the final time at Welfare records in Haverhill MA. On November 19, 2007, the band officially folded and announced their break-up. In an interview with Punkplanet.com conducted shortly after the band's dissolution Bryan stated that, among other things, creative differences, car theft, and crippling arthritis were the main factors leading to the breakup of the band.

=== 2011 ===
It was announced that Jailhouse Records would be re-issuing the long out of print Until We Die album by A Global Threat on the Jailhouse/Sixty Nine Apple label in CD format, as well as on vinyl format for the first time.

=== 2013 ===
On December 27th, 2013, the band would play their first show since 2007, a reunion show at Geno's Rock Club in Portland. this show would feature the original lineup of Bryan Lothian, Tim Webber, Scott Webber and Brett Threat for the first time since 1998.

=== 2016–2019 ===
On May 16th, 2016, punk band Strike Anywhere would announce an east coast tour, with A Global Threat once again reuniting to support the band on this tour. the band would play few shows and remain dormant until 2019, when they would play a handful of shows and festivals before once again dissolving.

== Band members ==
A Global Threat was somewhat notorious for its constantly changing line-up and numerous incarnations, with singer Bryan Lothian being the only founding member to remain in the band for its duration. The following is a partial list of its members since inception:

- Bryan Lothian: vocals, guitar (1997–2007, 2013, 2016–2019)
- "Tubby" Tim Webber: drums (1997–1998; guest 2013)
- Scott "Westie" Webber: guitar, drums (1997–1998; guest 2013)
- Brett Threat: bass (1997–1999; guest 2013)
- Mike Graves: drums (1998–2007, 2016–2019)
- Pete Curtis: guitar, bass (1998–2006)
- Mark Civitarese (Mark Unseen): vocals (1998–1999)
- Jonny Thayer: guitar, bass (1999)
- John Curran: bass (2001–2007, 2016–2019)

== Discography ==
=== EPs ===
- The Kids Will Revolt (1997) Crack Rock Records
- What the Fuck Will Change? (1998) ADD Records
- In The Red (2000) Rodent Popsicle Records
- Earache / Pass the Time (2003) Rodent Popsicle Records

=== Studio albums ===
- What the Fuck Will Change? (1999) Step 1 Records
- Until We Die (2000) GMM Records
- Here We Are (2002) Punk Core Records
- Where the Sun Never Sets (2006) BYO Records

=== Split albums ===
- A Global Threat / Broken (1999) Controlled Conscience
- A Global Threat / The End (1999) Anarchrist Records
- A Global Threat / Toxic Narcotic (2001) Rodent Popsicle Records
- A Global Threat / General Strike (2007) CRR the Early Years CD: Contains both bands's first 7-inch releases

=== Music videos ===
- "Cut-Ups" (2006)
