= Breakfast at Pappa's =

EP by Consumed
- Released: 28 July 1998
- Genre: Punk rock, melodic hardcore, skate punk
- Length: 15:04
- Label: Fat Wreck Chords
- Producer: Andy Sneap

Consumed chronology
Breakfast at Pappa's (1998)	Hit for Six (1999)

Professional ratings
Review scores
Source	Rating
AllMusic	link

Breakfast at Pappa's is an EP by the English punk rock band, Consumed. It was released in July 1998 on the American independent punk label, Fat Wreck Chords. The song "Heavy Metal Winner" was used in the video game Tony Hawk's Pro Skater 2, Tony Hawk's Pro Skater 1+2 and Totaled!.

== Track listing ==
- All tracks written by Consumed
1. "Heavy Metal Winner" – 2:29
2. "Bye-Bye, Fatman" – 2:48
3. "Brutal Tooth" – 1:33
4. "Stand Under Me" – 3:18
5. "Nonsense Cone" – 2:22
6. "Bigger Shoe" – 2:34

== Credits ==
- Steve Ford – guitar, vocals
- Mike Ford – guitar, vocals
- Baz Barrett – bass guitar
- Chris Billam – drums
- Produced and engineered by Andy Sneap
