= Take It As It Comes =

Take It As It Comes may refer to:

- "Take It As It Comes", a song by The Doors from the 1967 album The Doors
- "Take It As It Comes", a song by The Rowans from the 1975 album The Rowans (album)
- "Take It As It Comes", a song by Beth Nielsen Chapman from the 1990 album Beth Nielsen Chapman
- "Take It As It Comes", a song by Hot Water Music from the 1999 album BYO Split Series Volume I
- "Take It As It Comes", a song by J. Roddy Walston and the Business
- "Take It As It Comes", a song by Michael Martin Murphey from the 1981 album Hard Country
- "Take It As It Comes", a song by Milli Vanilli from the 1989 album Girl You Know It's True (album)
- "Take It As It Comes", a song by Steve Winwood from the 1986 album Back in the High Life
- "Take It As It Comes", a song by Vivian Girls from the 2011 album Share the Joy
- Take It As It Comes, a 2010 album by Herman Rarebell

== See also ==
- "Take It As It Come", a 2002 song by Charles Bradley
