= Consumed (band) =

English punk rock band

- Also known as: Desecrator
- Origin: Nottingham, England
- Genres: Skate punk; melodic hardcore
- Years active: 1992–2003, 2015–present
- Labels: Fat Wreck Chords, Golf, BYO, Spin Out, Bad News Records
- Members: Steve Ford; Chris Billam; Wes Wasley; Will Burchell
- Past members: Steve Watson; Baz Barrett; Mike Ford; Luke Moss; Jay Chapman

Consumed are an English punk rock band formed in 1992 on the outskirts of Nottingham. They were signed to Fat Wreck Chords, then moved to BYO Records and Golf Records shortly before the release of the album Pistols at Dawn. The band toured the UK, Europe, Scandinavia, the U.S., and Canada and also appeared regularly at surf and skate festivals in the mid-to late-1990s.

The band's first incarnation was called Desecrator (formed in 1989), which played death metal and released one album in 1991, titled Subconscious Release.

The track "Heavy Metal Winner" was used in the 2000 video game Tony Hawk's Pro Skater 2 and in the HD version, Tony Hawk's Pro Skater HD, in 2012. It was added to the 2020 remake Tony Hawk's Pro Skater 1+2. It was also used in the 2002 video game Totaled!.

The band broke up in 2003 but reformed in 2015 and are currently active. Consumed released a video for the track "What Would Cliff Burton Do?" in May 2018. The band's EP A Decade of No was released in July 2018 by SBÄM Records in Europe and Umlaut Records in the UK.

== Members ==
=== Current ===
- Steve Ford – guitar, vocals (1994–2003; 2015–present)
- Will Burchell – guitar, vocals (2000–2003; 2015–present)
- Wes Wasley – bass guitar, vocals (2000–2003; 2015–present)
- Chris Billam – drums (1994–2003; 2015–present)

=== Former ===
- Baz Barrett – bass guitar (1996–2000)
- Mike Ford – guitar, vocals (1994–2001)

=== Touring musicians ===
- Steve Watson – bass guitar (1994–1996)
- Luke Moss – bass guitar (2003)
- Jay Chapman – bass guitar (1994)

== Discography ==
=== Albums/EPs ===
- Breakfast at Pappa's EP (1998) Fat Wreck Chords
- Hit for Six (1999) Fat Wreck Chords
- Pistols at Dawn (2002) Golf / BYO Records
- A Decade of No EP (2018) SBAM / Umlaut Records

=== Music videos ===
- "Wake Up with a Smile" (1999)
- "What Would Cliff Burton Do?" (2018)

=== Compilations ===
- Don't Do It (1996) Spin Out Records
- Short Music for Short People (1999) Fat Wreck Chords
- Fat Music Vol. IV: Life in the Fat Lane (1999) Fat Wreck Chords
- Fat Music Vol. V: Live Fat, Die Young (2001) Fat Wreck Chords
- Greetings from the Welfare State BYO Records
- Deck Cheese, Volume 2 Deck Cheese Records
