= Stop the violence =

Stop the violence may refer to:

- "Stop the Violence Movement", started by KRS-One
  - "Stop the Violence", a song by Boogie Down Productions from the album By All Means Necessary
- A slogan used in civil rights movements and other organizations, such as:
  - Gender Equality Bureau
  - Hip Hop Caucus
  - Stop the Violence campaign by radio station KHUM
  - Stop the Violence screening tour for the film Sin by Silence
  - Stop the Violence Committee in Seattle, which featured an artwork by Gerard Tsutakawa
- "Stop the Violence", song by Mo' Hits All Stars from the album Curriculum Vitae
- "Stop D Violence", a slogan by clothing brand Cross Colours
- "Stop the Violence", song by The Silvertones
- "Stop the Violence", song by A Global Threat from the album What the Fuck Will Change?

== See also ==
- Stop Violence, 2002 Malayalam action film directed by A. K. Sajan
- Stop Violence Against Women
