= Shattered Dreams (disambiguation) =

"Shattered Dreams" is a 1987 song by Johnny Hates Jazz. It may also refer to:

== Literature ==
- Shattered Dreams, a 1979 novel by Sally Wentworth
- Shattered Dreams: My Life as a Polygamist's Wife, a book by Irene Spencer
- Shattered Dreams: The Story of Charlotte Fedders, a 1987 book by Charlotte Fedders
- Shattered Dreams: God`s Unexpected Pathway to Joy, a 2001 book by Larry Crabb

== Film and television ==
- Shattered Dreams (1922 film), American silent drama film directed by Paul Scardon
- Shattered Dreams (1990 film), TV film starring Lindsay Wagner and Michael Nouri based on the Charlotte Fedders novel
- "Shattered Dreams", 1985 episode of Dallas
- "Shattered Dreams" (Doctors), a 2002 television episode
- "Shattered Dreams", 2007 episode of Global Currents
- "Shattered Dreams", 2012 episode of After the First 48

== Music ==
- The Shattered Dream, a 1986 album by Hungry for What, in association with BYO Records
- "Shattered Dreams", a song from the 2010 album Memphis Blues by Cyndi Lauper
- "Shattered Dreams", a song from the 2018 album Some Rap Songs by Earl Sweatshirt

== Other uses ==
- Shattered Dreams, a pro wrestling attack
