= Dreffa =

Montres Dreffa SA
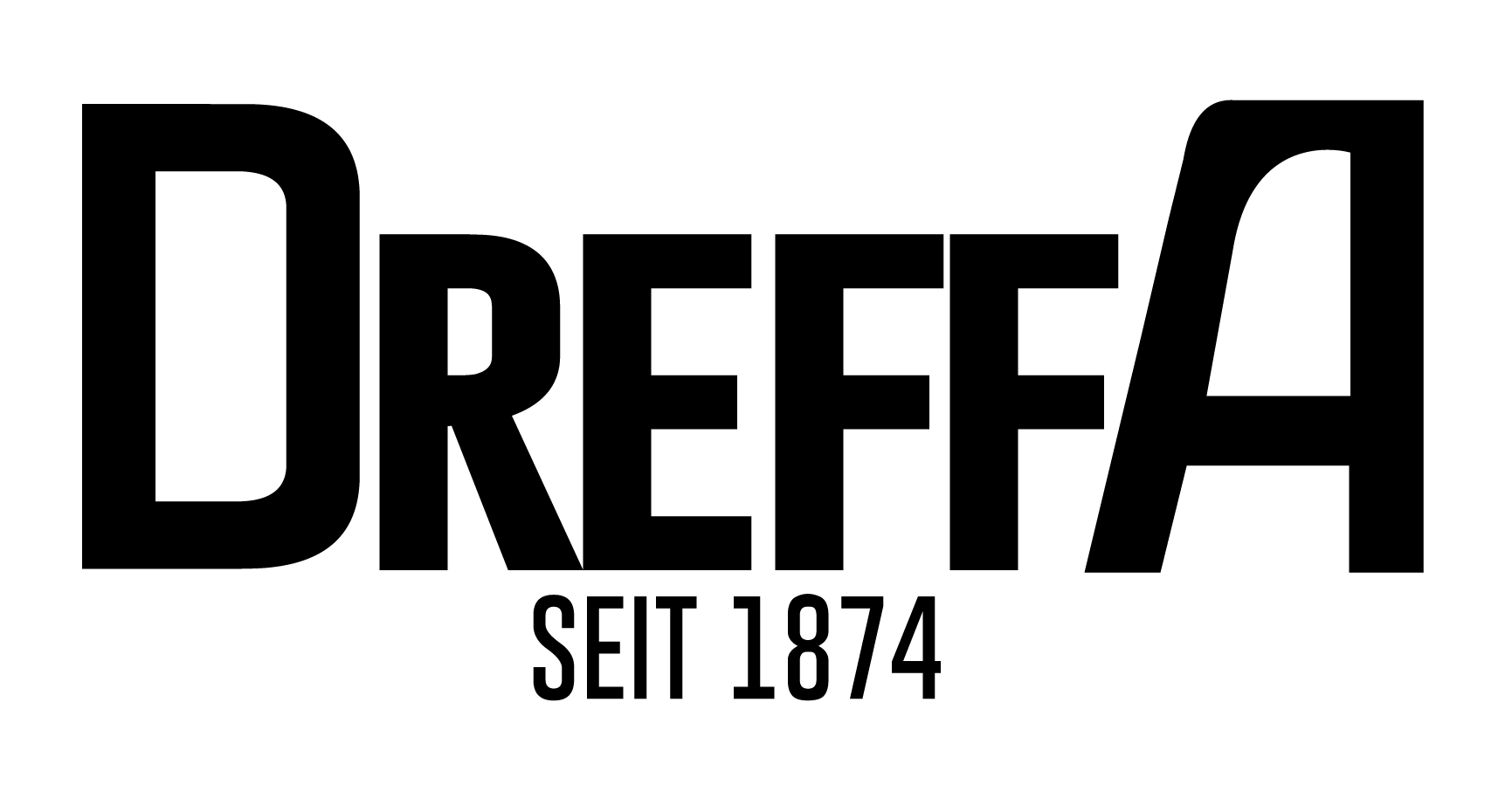
- Type: Wholly owned subsidiary
- Industry: Watchmaking
- Founded: 1874
- Headquarters: Geneva, Switzerland
- Key people: Armand Dreyfus(founder); Jacques Maguin (CEO); Mark Haus (President); Yehuda Fulda (Chairman)
- Products: Wristwatches
- Parent: TGX Holdings
- Website: Dreffa.com

Dreffa made Swiss watches. The name is a trademark owned by TGX Holdings.

== History ==
Since 1874 the family of Armand Dreyfus was working with watches in La-Chaux-De-Fonds. Armand Dreyfus is born the 21 January 1894.He established Dreffa in Genève, Switzerland as Montres Dreffa, SA. Montres meaning watches in French and Dreffa which was derived from his name DREyFus FA. In 1924, Dreyfus sought to expand the market outside of Switzerland and the name was changed to Dreffa Watch Co, SA.

In 1946 Montres Dreffa, SA registered the name Dreffa Watch in the US and started selling its luxury watches in the USA under the Dreffa name. The logo was changed to include the word Genève. However, In 1975 during the quartz crisis Montres Dreffa, SA suffered along with hundreds of other Swiss watch companies and reduced production of its fine watches as the market for mechanical watches declined in favor of quartz movements. The factory was based at 30 Rue du Stand, Genève

In 1985 Jacques Maguin acquired the Dreffa brand and updated the logo to include a D with clock-hands inside at 10:10.

In 2014 TGX Holdings acquired the Dreffa brand trademark. Yehuda Fulda, Chairman of the Board of TGX Holdings, brought in Mark Haus to oversee operations. Besides manufacturing in Genève watches will be manufactured in Glashütte as well.

== Collections ==
Watches include the triple-date moonphase chronograph, diamond- and jewel-embedded feminine watches, Dreffa Swiss 200 meter professional diver's ATM Watch, Dreffa Genève Swiss gold-plated classic men's watch, Dreffa 17-jewel 10-karat gold-plated bezel ladies' wristwatch and VTG 1950's Dreffa Genève YGF.

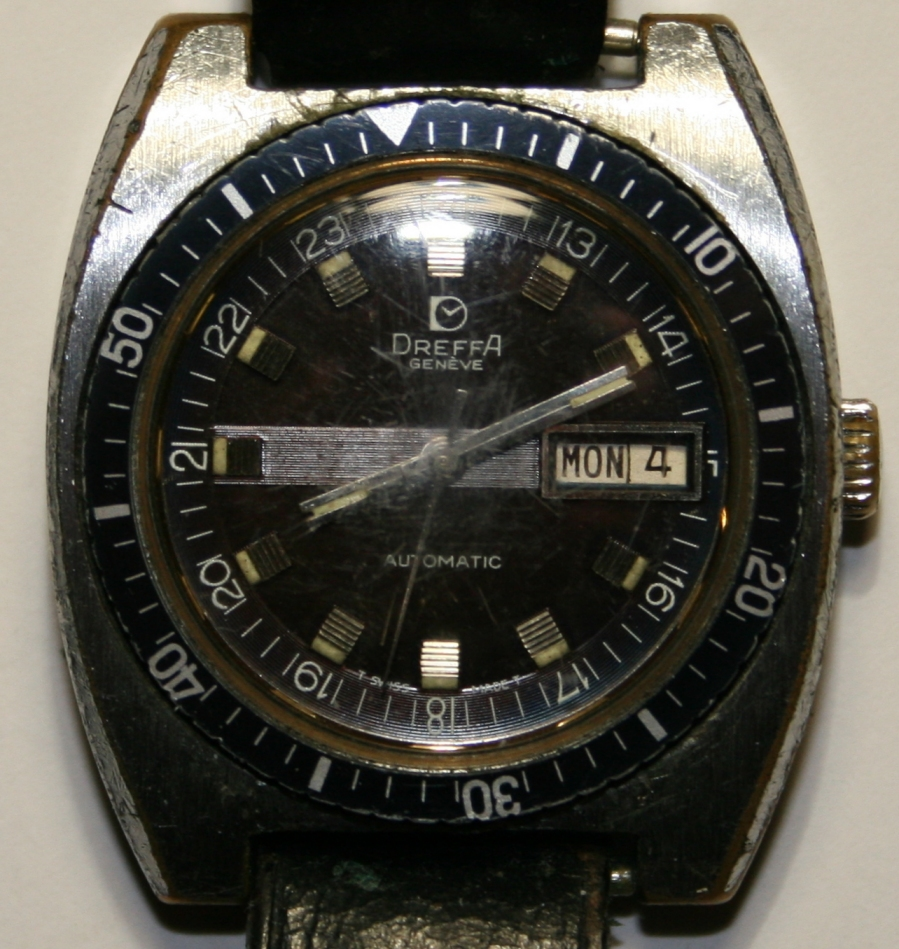
A Dreffa watch from the 60's-70's
