= Ganei HaEla =

Ganei HaEla: גני האלה (Hebrew)
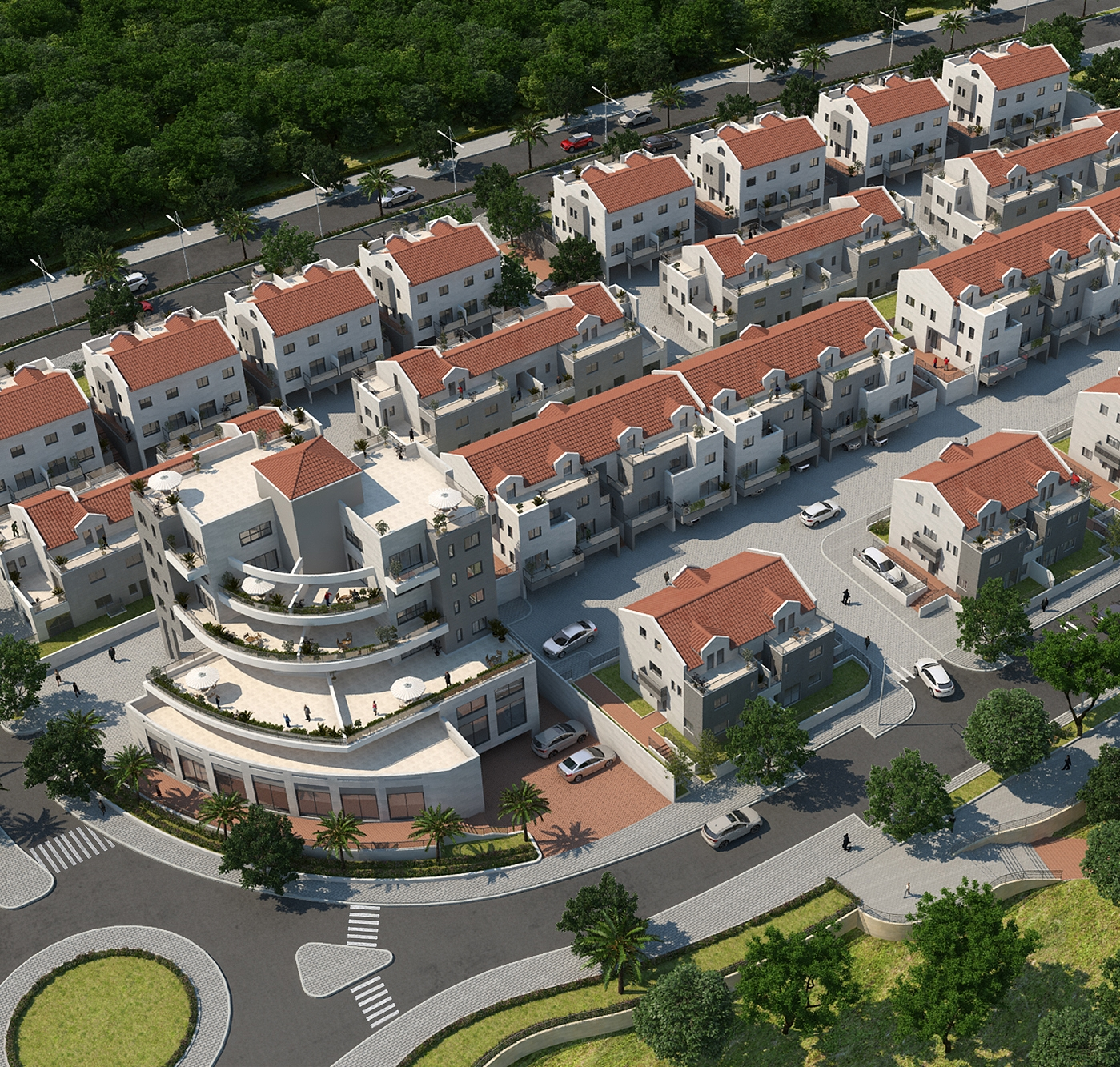
- Aerial View
- Etymology: Gardens of Ellah Valley
- Location within Jerusalem District
- Coordinates: 31°42′32.7″N 34°59′41.55″E
- Country: Israel
- District: Jerusalem
- Council: Mateh Yehuda Regional Council
- Founded: 2013
- Founder: Rabbi Dovid Gottlieb as community Rabbi and Yehuda Fulda as developer
- Population (2017): Est. 800
- Website: https://www.efi-natif.co.il/copy-of

Ganei HaEla (Hebrew: גני האלה) is a community of Beit Shemesh in Israel with 96 homes geared toward Dati Leumi Torani and Modern Orthodox Jews.

== Etymology ==
Ganei HaEla is located close to Emek HaEla (Hebrew: עמק האלה) which also inspired its name. The Emek HaEla is where Dovid HaMelech fought Goliath (Shmuel Alef 17:2).

== History ==
Ganei Haela is a planned community located in Ramat Beit Shemesh. It began with two neighbors Rabbi Dovid Gottlieb and Yehuda Fulda who both made aliyah from the USA. They brought in Shelly Levine of Tivuch Shelly to market the project.

== Demographics ==
The residents of Ganei HaEla will be only Orthodox Jews, specifically Dati Leumi Torani. The neighborhood will be mostly a community of English-speaking olim from the USA, UK and Canada.

== Synagogue and Religious Leadership ==
Ganei HaEla will have one Central synagogue under the leadership of Rabbi Dovid Gottlieb. Rabbi Gottlieb is the former Rabbi of Congregation Shomrei Emunah in Baltimore. He received his rabbinic ordination from Yeshiva University (RIETS), where he was also a member of Wexner Kollel Elyon. In addition to publishing numerous articles and co-editing two scholarly works, Rabbi Gottlieb is the author of Ateret Yaakov, a book of in-depth essays about a wide range of halachic topics. Currently he is a Rebbe for the Overseas Program at Yeshivat Har Etzion (Gush).

== American Style Construction ==
Ganei HaEla is the first project in Israel to utilize lightweight steel and drywall construction. Almost every single home in Israel is built from cement and block.
