= Lower Class Crucifixion =

Studio album by The Unseen
- Released: June 1, 1997 (Original); Oct 20, 1998 (re-issue)
- Genre: Street punk
- Length: 30:08
- Label: VML Records, A-F Records

The Unseen chronology
Raise Your Finger Raise Your Fist (1996)	Lower Class Crucifixion (1997)	So This Is Freedom? (1999)

Professional ratings
Review scores
Source	Rating
Allmusic	link

Lower Class Crucifixion is an album by the Massachusetts-based punk rock band The Unseen, released in 1997.

== Track listing ==
1. "Children of the Revolution" (Paul) – 3:04
2. "Too Young to Know...Too Reckless to Care" (Mark, Scott) – 1:54
3. "Alone" (Tripp, Scott, Paul) – 2:03
4. "Social Security" (Scott, Mark) – 2:02
5. "Goodbye America" (Paul) – 2:55
6. "New World Fodder" (Paul, Scott) – 2:39
7. "Police Brutality" (Paul, Scott) – 1:56
8. "What Are We Waiting For?" (Paul) – 2:33
9. "Unseen Class" (Scott, Mark) – 1:21
10. "Coincidence or Consequence?" (Paul) – 2:18
11. "In the City" (Paul) – 2:19
12. "A.D.D." (Tripp) – 0:47
13. "Thorn" (Cover of Poison's "Every Rose Has Its Thorn") – 4:11

== Personnel ==
- Mark - Drums, Vocals
- Paul - Guitar, Drums, Vocals, Organ
- Tripp - Bass, Vocals
- Scott - Guitar
