= Don't Call Me White =

Single by NOFX

from the album Punk in Drublic
- Released: August 26, 1994
- Genre: Punk rock
- Length: 2:33 (album version)
- Label: Epitaph
- Songwriter: Fat Mike
- Producers: Fat Mike; Ryan Greene

NOFX singles chronology
"Liza and Louise" (1992)	"Don't Call Me White" (1994)	"Leave It Alone" (1995)

"Don't Call Me White" is a 7" single by NOFX featuring two songs from Punk in Drublic (1994); "Don't Call Me White" and "Punk Guy". The record was limited to 1,500 copies on white vinyl. The band sometimes changes the word white to Scheiß (the German word for "shit") during their live shows.

== Meaning ==
When asked in a 1994 interview if the song is about reverse racism, Fat Mike responded saying, "Basically, I'm tired of all these correct terms you're supposed to be calling people now."

== Cover versions ==
- The Spanish punk band Avalots made a cover version of "Don't Call Me White" in Catalan called "No em digueu blanc".
- The band Rancid also covered the song on the BYO Split Series Volume III.
- On the obscure tape Sin Efectos by Sin Efectos, a cover called "No Me Llames Gringo" is featured.
