= Explode (album) =

Studio album by The Unseen
- Released: June 3, 2003
- Recorded: February 2003
- Studio: The Outpost, Stoughton, Massachusetts
- Genre: Punk rock
- Label: BYO Records
- Producer: Jim Siegel; The Unseen

The Unseen chronology
The Complete Singles Collection 1994–2000 (2002)	Explode (2003)	State of Discontent (2005)

Professional ratings
Review scores
Source	Rating
AllMusic	4/5 stars

Explode is the fourth studio album by the American streetpunk band The Unseen, released on June 3, 2003.

== Track listing ==
1. "False Hope" (lyrics: Mark music: Scott)
2. "Your Failure Is My Revenge" (lyrics & music: Tripp)
3. "Explode" (lyrics: Mark music: Scott)
4. "Don't Look Back" (lyrics & music: Tripp)
5. "Negative Outlook" (lyrics: Mark music: Scott)
6. "Tsunami Suicide" (lyrics: Paul music: Scott)
7. "So Sick Of You" (lyrics: Mark music: Scott)
8. "Remains Unseen" (lyrics & music: Tripp)
9. "Fed Up" (lyrics: Mark music: Scott)
10. "Useless Regrets" (lyrics & music: Tripp)
11. "Victims" (lyrics & music: Tripp)
12. "New World Disorder" (lyrics: Mark music: Scott)

== Personnel ==
- Mark - Drums, Vocals
- Paul - Guitar, Vocals
- Tripp - Bass, Vocals
- Scott - Lead Guitar
- Pat Melzard - Drums (on tracks 1, 3, 5, 7, 9, & 12)
