= Totally Unseen: The Best of the Unseen =

Compilation album by The Unseen
- Released: July 4, 2000
- Label: Step One

The Unseen chronology
So This Is Freedom? (1999)	Totally Unseen: The Best of the Unseen (2000)	The Anger & the Truth (2001)

Professional ratings
Review scores
Source	Rating
AllMusic	2.5/5 stars

Totally Unseen: The Best of the Unseen is a greatest hits album by American punk rock band The Unseen, released in July 2000.

== Track listing ==
1. "Are We Dead Yet" (Paul) – 2:58
2. "Alone" (Tripp, Scott, Paul) – 2:05
3. "What Are You Going to Do?" (Mark, Scott) – 2:19
4. "Stay Gold" – 1:43
5. "There's Still Hope" (Paul, Mark, Scott) – 3:54
6. "Goodbye America" (Paul) – 2:57
7. "Social Security" (Scott, Mark) – 2:04
8. "Greed Is a Disease" (Mark, Scott) – 1:21
9. "A.D.D." (Tripp) – :48
10. "Coincidence or Consequence" (Paul) – 2:20
11. "Systems Destruction" – 2:05
12. "Don't Be Fooled" (Tripp) – 1:34
