= So This Is Freedom? =

So This Is Freedom

Studio album by The Unseen
- Released: October 20, 1999
- Recorded: March 1999
- Genre: Street punk
- Length: 31:36
- Label: A-F Records

The Unseen chronology
Lower Class Crucifixion (1997)	So This Is Freedom (1999)	Totally Unseen: The Best of the Unseen (2000)

Professional ratings
Review scores
Source	Rating
Allmusic	2.5/5 stars

So This Is Freedom is an album by the Massachusetts-based punk rock band The Unseen, released in 1999.

== Track listing ==
1. "What Are You Gonna Do?" (lyrics: Mark music: Scott) 2:18
2. "Are We Dead Yet?" (lyrics & music: Paul) 2:58
3. "Stand Up and Fight" (lyrics: Tripp & Mark music: Tripp) 2:11
4. "Punks Attack" (lyrics & music: Paul) 2:27
5. "Dead and Gone" (lyrics: Mark Music: Tripp) 2:20
6. "There's Still Hope" (lyrics: Paul & Mark music: Paul & Scott) 3:53
7. "Greed Is a Disease" (lyrics: Mark music: Scott) 1:20
8. "Piss Off" (lyrics: Trip music: Tripp & Paul) 2:15
9. "Don't be Fooled" (lyrics & music: Tripp) 1:34
10. "Cultural Genocide" (lyrics: Tripp music: Scott & Paul) 1:57
11. "Sent to Die" (lyrics: Mark music: Scott & Mark) 1:48
12. "Tradition" (lyrics: Tripp music: Tripp & Paul) 1:52
13. "So This Is Freedom?" (lyrics: Tripp music: Tripp & Scott) 2:52
14. "Beat It" (Michael Jackson cover) 1:51

== Personnel ==
- Mark - Drums, Vocals
- Paul - Guitar, Drums, Vocals, Organ
- Tripp - Bass, Vocals
- Scott - Guitar, Vocals
- Bill Brown - additional vocals (track 8)
