= BYO Split Series =

Split album series

The BYO Split Series is a series of albums put out by BYO Records. Each album is a split album which features two bands, with each band doing a cover of the other bands music on the album. The series started in 1999, and so far contains 5 releases.

== Releases ==
Year	Title	Features
1999	BYO Split Series Volume I	Leatherface and Hot Water Music
1999	BYO Split Series Volume II	Swingin' Utters and Youth Brigade
2002	BYO Split Series Volume III	NOFX and Rancid
2002	BYO Split Series Volume IV	The Bouncing Souls and Anti-Flag
2004	BYO Split Series Volume V	Alkaline Trio and One Man Army
