= Cherry Knowle =

Studio album by Leatherface
- Released: 1989
- Studio: Beamont Street
- Genre: Hardcore punk
- Length: 35:07
- Label: Meantime

Leatherface chronology
Cherry Knowle (1989)	Fill Your Boots (1990)

Cherry Knowle is the first full-length album by the English punk band Leatherface. The album is named after Cherry Knowle Hospital in Ryhope, Sunderland, and the album's cover reflects the hospital's Victorian origins. It was recorded at Beaumont Street Studios.

== Critical reception ==
Professional ratings
Review scores
Source	Rating
AllMusic	3/5 stars
The Encyclopedia of Popular Music	3/5 stars

Trouser Press called the album a "fine hardcore" record, writing that the "seeds of Leatherface’s later work are there in the debut’s 'Colorado Joe/Leningrad Vlad,' 'Discipline' and 'Cabbage Case.'"

== Track listing ==
1. "Colorado Joe/Leningrad Vlad" - 3:07
2. "Animal Day" - 2:11
3. "This Land" - 2:39
4. "Ghetto" - 1:57
5. "Discipline" - 3:10
6. "Postwar Product of a Fat Man's Wallet" - 3:15
7. "Cabbage Case" - 3:04
8. "Right Reverend" - 2:08
9. "Alright Jack" - 2:31
10. "Sublime" - 4:20
11. "Smile (You're in a Free and Pleasant Land)" - 2:59
12. "Goulash" - 1:44
13. "Heaven" - 2:02
