= We're All Doomed =

Studio album by Toxic Narcotic
- Released: June 11, 2002
- Genre: Crust punk
- Length: 30:29
- Label: Go-Kart Records
- Producer: Ken Cmar

Toxic Narcotic chronology
88-99 (2000)	We're All Doomed (2002)

Professional ratings
Review scores
Source	Rating
Allmusic	2.5/5 stars

We're All Doomed is an album by Boston crust punk band Toxic Narcotic. It was released in 2002 by Go-Kart Records. Lyrically, the album deals with political and environmental issues. The songs on this album, like most Crust Punk, are short and only a small number are over 3 minutes long.

== Background ==
Unlike many of the band’s previous releases which were done through their own record label Rodent Popsicle Records, they instead decided to sign with Go-Kart Records for this release. The band had been in contact with many other West Coast labels who told them they would put out the record but they wouldn’t be the priority. The album’s original title was gonna be 5 Billion People Must Die, which many of these West Coast labels weren’t a fan of either. However after lead singer Bill Damon seen an interview with Go-Kart Records owner he stated "here’s a label I might be able to work with".

In an interview with Lollipop magazine Damon commented on the album stating:

All the material on We’re all Doomed was written before 9/11, and it was recorded in January when we got the go-ahead from Go-Kart. People’s eyes are open, the ’90s are over. The ’90s was a nice time for Americans: They made a lot of money, they had a pretty easy ride. But reality is settling in that there are a lot of problems in the world.

The albums title was in reference to many people at the time of its release feeling that there would be a limited future.

== Critical reception ==
Keith Gordon of AllMusic wrote "We're All Doomed is unabashedly hardcore, the songs leaping off the disc and into your ears in an angry blur of rage and manic energy. From the blitz-styled attack of the opening title cut through the metallic machine-gun riffs." Adding "The band makes some decent points with its lyrics, the street vocabulary of the songs reducing complex issues to a verse/chorus argument." Rob Ferrarz of Exclaim! added "These 13 fast and heavy songs are enough to get you amped-up and off your apathetic ass. No songs about girls here, it is all doom and gloom. And they aren’t out for popularity with songs like "Asshole".

== Track listing ==
1. We're All Doomed (3:07)
2. Whatever It Takes (3:07)
3. I'm So Thirsty (1:57)
4. Asshole (2:27)
5. Ruined (2:33)
6. We're Not Happy 'Til You're Not Happy (2:57)
7. At War With Nature (2:10)
8. Pave the Planet (2:14)
9. Bullshit Conditions (2:08)
10. You Were Warned (1:59)
11. Talk Is Poison Idea (2:37)
12. Shut the Fuck Up (1:34)
13. 5 Billion People Must Die (1:52)

== Personnel ==
Credits adapted from the album's liner notes and AllMusic.

Toxic Narcotic

- Bill Damon — vocals
- Will Sullivan — guitar, backing vocals
- Sam Jodrey — drums
- Seager Tennis — bass

Production

- Ken Cmar — producer
- Alan Douches — mastering
- Richard Marr — mixing
- Jon Spencer — composer
- Beck Campbell — composer
- Pete Jackson — artwork
