= The Anger and the Truth =

Studio album by The Unseen
- Released: July 17, 2001
- Recorded: April 2001
- Studio: The Outpost, Stoughton, Massachusetts
- Genre: Hardcore punk
- Length: 25:42
- Label: BYO Records
- Producer: Jim Siegel

The Unseen chronology
Totally Unseen: The Best of the Unseen (2000)	The Anger and the Truth (2001)	The Complete Singles Collection 1994-2000 (2004)

Professional ratings
Review scores
Source	Rating
Allmusic	2.5/5 stars

The Anger and the Truth is the third full-length album by the Boston street punk band The Unseen.

== Track listing ==
1. "Live in Fear" (lyrics: Mark / music: Scott) (2:15)
2. "Something to Say" (lyrics & music: Paul) (1:52)
3. "Give In to Hate" (lyrics: Tripp / music: Paul) (2:06)
4. "1,000 Miles" (Lyrics: Mark, Paul, & Tripp / Music: Scott) (1:24)
5. "The Anger and the Truth" (lyrics & music: Paul) (2:18)
6. "No Turning Back" (lyrics & music: Tripp) (1:32)
7. "What Happened?" (lyrics: Paul / music: Paul & Tripp) (2:45)
8. "No Master Race" (lyrics: Mark / music: Scott) (2:23)
9. "Never Forget" (lyrics & music: Tripp) (1:55)
10. "Where Have You Gone?" (lyrics: Mark / music: Scott) (2:38)
11. "Fight for a Better Life" (lyrics & music: Paul) (2:20)
12. "No Evacuation" (Lyrics & Music: Brian "Chainsaw" Reily) (2:16)

== Personnel ==
- Mark – Drums, Vocals
- Paul – Guitar, Drums, Vocals
- Tripp – Bass, Vocals
- Scott – Guitar
