= Toxic Narcotic =

American crust punk band

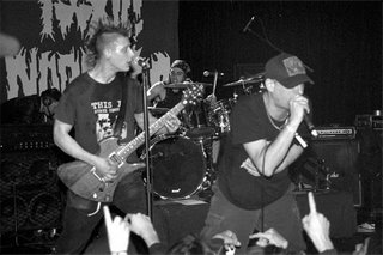

Background information
- Origin: Boston, Massachusetts, U.S.
- Genres: Crust punk, hardcore punk
- Years active: 1989–2008
- Labels: Rodent Popsicle Records, Go Kart Records
- Spinoffs: Mouth Sewn Shut
- Members: Bill Damon (vocals); Seager Tennis (bass); Will Sullivan (guitar); Sam Jodrey (drums)
- Past members: Drummers: Kevin Barnello (1989-1996); Eric O'Brien; Tristan Smaldone; Bassists: Joe Rizzi (1996-1998); Ben Upton (1998-2000)
- Website: Official website

Toxic Narcotic is an American crust punk band from Boston, Massachusetts, United States, who formed in 1989 with the intent of mixing their favorite elements of punk, hardcore, and metal into an original sound with some political lyrics. Most of their albums have been released on their label, Rodent Popsicle Records. The album We're All Doomed was released in 2002 on Go-Kart Records and a split CD with Misery was released in 2004, also on Go-Kart Records. In total they released 8 EPs, 5 split EPs, 1 album and 2 compilation albums.

The band were known for their D.I.Y. style and toured extensively throughout the US during the 1990s and 2000s. The band went through many lineup changes throughout their tenure but vocalist Bill Damon remained a stable throughout. The group quietly disbanded following an injury to their drummer Sam Jodrey in 2008.

== History ==
Toxic Narcotic formed out of Boston, Massachusetts in the summer of 1989 as a three piece which featured Bill Damon on bass and vocals, Will Sullivan on guitar and vocals, and Kevin Barnello on drums. The bands was formed with the intent to mix their favorite elements of punk, hardcore, and metal. The original lineup went on to release multiple eps including their debut Populution in 1992 along with New Ways To Create Waste and 2Oz. Slab Of Hate in 1993. They then embarked on their first official tour in 1994. Throughout the band’s tenure they did most tours on their own with no help, for the final three weeks of their inaugural tour they teamed up with Chaos UK. In 1996 they released their third demo You Wreckt Em. Then following a couple of tours Damon decided to solely focus on lead vocals which led to Joe Rizzi joining the band to play bass. That same year original drummer Kevin Barnello left the band to focus on other musical ventures. He was replaced by the bands longtime roadie Sam Jodrey in 1997, that year they also released another demo Damn Near Killed Em.

In 1998 another lineup change occurred when Rizzi moved to Seattle, Washington resulting in Ben Upton joining the band. Upton was proficient in multiple instruments. Due this during his tenure in the band they would open up their concerts with an instrumental with Upton playing the bagpipes and Damon playing bass. Throughout the 1990s the band toured consistently over the US which helped them gain a dedicated following.

In 2000 the band released a compilation album titled 89-99 on Rodent Popsicle Records which was a re recording of 19 songs from the band’s first 10 years. Upton would then leave the band to start studying in furniture making. The band would have Eric O’Brien and Tristian Smaldone fill in on tours for the next two years until Seager Tennis joined as a permanent member in the Summer of 2002. On June 11, 2002 the band released their first proper full length album We’re All Doomed via Go-Kart Records. Around this time the members of the band started to clean up their act and quit smoking which lead singer Bill Damon credited to them focusing more on music.

In January and February 2003 Toxic Narcotic toured the West Coast alongside Circle Jerks. Later in September of that year they toured the East Coast alongside Discharge. October and November 2003 seen the band play 49 shows across the US with U.K. Subs.

In June 2004 the band went on a West Coast tour alongside Defiance, they also played sporadic one of shows throughout the year. On July 27, 2004 they released a slit Ep with Misery titled Toxic Narcotic / Misery. Later in the year they played their 15th anniversary show on December 18, 2004, was filmed by Subversion Media. Titled live in Boston it was later released on Rodent Popsicle Records in 2005 and included bonus footage of interviews with fans.

The band toured the United States and Europe extensively through their career. In 2005, the band performed at North East Sticks Together. Throughout the year they went on short East Coast tours with The Varukers, Fleas and Lice along with an August West Coast tour with SKARP. They also released a second compilation album Toxic Narcotic: 21st Century Discography. Later that year, Toxic Narcotic went on hiatus and two of its members, Bill Damon and Will Sullivan, formed the band Mouth Sewn Shut. They then took all of 2006 off.

The band returned to touring on March 18, 2007 at Sterling Hotel in Allentown, Pennsylvania. They then held their first official tour in nearly two years a West Coast tour alongside Leftover Crack in October of that year.

Sam Jodrey, the drummer, hurt his back in 2008 and all following shows had to be cancelled, the band never reunited afterwards.

== Musical style ==
Described as "one of the most hard working and essential DIY hardcore punk bands in the entire scene" many label them crust or hardcore, they do not self-identify with any one specific subgenre of DIY punk. During the bands early years they were known for not sounding great live however they improved as time went on. In a 2002 interview lead singer Bill Damon commented on this stating that their poor sound early on led to people labeling them as a crust band stating "people called us crust cuz we were fast and brutal, but were basically punks who played shitty metal with no guitar solos."

Their songs typically include political, nihilistic, anti-war, -violence, hatred towards ignorance and green peace lyrics. As per the bands website they claim no specific political philosophy or ideology except for an extreme dedication to the ideals of the DIY lifestyle in general.

Their name, as revealed in an interview with Vice, is associated with the movement, the lead singer saying "... The name means what is says. Narcotics, chemicals, and ignorance are toxic, not just to the human mind, but also to humanity in general."

=== Legacy ===
In a 2023 retrospective article on the band hardcore punk webzine idioteq wrote "Toxic Narcotic are legends. They put Boston on the map in a way that almost no other band from Boston in the 1990’s did. They made music that was original and from their heart."

== Rodent Popsicle Records ==
In 1992, lead singer Bill Damon founded Rodent Popsicle Records, the label was originally created just to release the music of Toxic Narcotics and a few other bands from the Boston area which is why the band picked such a non serious name for the label. However around 2000 Rodent Popsicle Damon began taking the label more seriously, releasing albums for bands worldwide and began booking shows for both large and small bands. The label mostly worked with bands in the punk genre.

== Band members ==
=== Final Lineup ===
- Bill Damon — vocals (1989-2008)
- Will Sullivan — guitar (1989-2008)
- Sam Jodrey — drums (1997-2008)
- Seager Tennis — bass (2002-2008)

=== Former members ===
- Kevin Barnello — drums (1989-1996)
- Joe Rizzi — bass (1996-1998)
- Ben Upton — bass (1998-2000)

== Discography ==
=== EPs ===
- Populution (1992)
- New Ways To Create Waste (1993)
- 2Oz. Slab Of Hate (1993)
- You Wreckt Em (1996)
- Damn Near Killed Em (1997)
- Had it Coming (2002)
- Shoot People, Not Dope (2003)
- Beer In The Shower (2003)

=== Studio albums ===
- We're All Doomed (2002)

=== Splits ===
- Toxic Narcotic/Whorehouse Of Representatives (1997)
- Bostons Finest - Toxic Narcotic / The Unseen (1998)
- Toxic Narcotic/August Spies (1999)
- The Split - Toxic Narcotic / A Global Threat (2001)
- Toxic Narcotic / Misery (2004)

=== Compilation albums ===
- 89-99 (2000)
- Toxic Narcotic: 21st Century Discography (2005)

=== Video albums ===
- Live in Boston (2005)
