= BYO Split Series Volume I =

Studio album by Leatherface and Hot Water Music
- Released: April 20, 1999
- Recorded: March 5–23, 1999
- Genre: Melodic Hardcore, Emocore
- Length: 33:12
- Label: BYO (BYO 060)

BYO Split Series chronology
BYO Split Series Volume I (1999)	Volume II (1999)

Leatherface chronology
Discography Part Two (1998)	BYO Split Series Volume I (1999)	Horsebox (2000)

Hot Water Music chronology
No Division (1999)	BYO Split Series Volume I (1999)	A Flight and a Crash (2001)

Professional ratings
Review scores
Source	Rating
AllMusic	4/5 stars
The Encyclopedia of Popular Music	3/5 stars

BYO Split Series Volume I is an album by Leatherface and Hot Water Music, the first entry in the BYO Split Series. It was released in 1999.

== Production ==
The bands recorded the album after a joint 1998 tour of America. They embarked on a second joint tour, in 2000, to support the album.

"Andy" is about former Leatherface bass player Andy Crighton, who had committed suicide before the band reformed.

== Critical reception ==
Trouser Press called "Andy" "a blistering return," writing that Leatherface's half of the album "picks up where The Last left off, obliterating the five-year gap between studio recordings."

== Track listing ==
Leatherface
No.	Title	Length
1.	"Andy"	3:26
2.	"Eat Her Face"	2:01
3.	"Wax Lyrical"	3:53
4.	"Punch"	3:21
5.	"Deep Green Beautiful Levelling"	3:39
6.	"Gangparty"	3:48

Hot Water Music
No.	Title	Length
7.	"Caught Up"	2:11
8.	"Wrong and Righteous"	2:23
9.	"Take It As It Comes"	1:54
10.	"Dead End Streets"	2:51
11.	"The Bitter End"	3:45
Total length:		33:12
