= Earache / Pass the Time =

2003 EP by A Global Threat

Earache / Pass The Time

EP by A Global Threat
- Released: March 13, 2003
- Genre: Punk
- Length: 9:03
- Label: Rodent Popsicle Records

A Global Threat chronology
Here We Are (A Global Threat album) (2002)	Earache / Pass The Time (2003)	Where The Sun Never Sets (2006)

Professional ratings
Review scores
Source	Rating
Sputnikmusic	3.4

"Earache/Pass The Time" is an EP by A Global Threat. It was released on March 13, 2003, on CD and 7" vinyl on Rodent Popsicle Records. Their sound has changed again since 2002's Here We Are, this release being closer to the style of their following album Where The Sun Never Sets.

== Track listing ==
Side A

No.	Title	Length
1.	""Earache""	1:45
2.	""Social Quarantine""	2:04
3.	""Get in the Coffin""	0:55

Side B

No.	Title	Length
1.	""Pass the Time""	1:18
2.	""Tuff Crowd""	1:09
3.	""Cardinal Sin""	2:21

== Personnel ==
- Bryan Lothian - vocals and guitar
- John Curran - bass guitar and vocals
- Mike Graves - drums
