= Here We Are (A Global Threat album) =

2002 album by hardcore punk band A Global Threat

Studio album by A Global Threat
- Released: April 16, 2002
- Studio: Kissypig Studios
- Genre: Hardcore punk, punk rock
- Length: 26:22
- Label: Punk Core Records

A Global Threat chronology
A Global Threat / Toxic Narcotic (2001)	Here We Are (2002)	Earache / Pass the Time (2003)

Professional ratings
Review scores
Source	Rating
Allmusic	link
Sputnik Music	link

Here We Are is the third studio album by A Global Threat. It was released on April 16, 2002, on Punk Core Records. This album shows the band departing slightly from the sound of Until We Die and What The Fuck Will Change?, incorporating complicated times and music.

== Track listing ==
No.	Title	Length
1.	"Here We Are"	2:01
2.	"Mind Bomb"	1:54
3.	"Lab Rat"	1:33
4.	"Out in the Dark"	2:10
5.	"On the Clock"	1:51
6.	"Bloody Red Eyes"	1:52
7.	"Living Dead"	2:09
8.	"Invite a Coroner"	1:32
9.	"So Paranoid"	2:29
10.	"Blow You Away"	1:35
11.	"Bury Your Parents"	2:32
12.	"Theres Your Threat"	2:11
13.	"Sirens"	1:34
14.	"D.F."
15.	Untitled	0:59

== Personnel ==
- Bryan Lothian - vocals/guitar
- John Curran - bass guitar
- Mike Graves - drums
- Pete - vocals on "D.F."
