= Sex Objects =

Studio album by The Briefs
- Released: 2004
- Genre: Punk rock
- Length: 31:29
- Label: BYO

The Briefs chronology
| Off the Charts (2003) | Sex Objects (2004) | Steal Yer Heart (2005) |

Professional ratings
Review scores
| Source | Rating |
|---|---|
| AllMusic | 3.5/5 stars |
| PopMatters | (favorable) |
| Robert Christgau | (1-star Honorable Mention) |

Sex Objects is the third full-length studio album by The Briefs, released in 2004 on CD, and yellow and black vinyl. It was released in France with an additional, unnamed track, and on yellow wax records.

== Track listing ==
1. Orange Alert 2:01
2. Halfsize Girl 1:47
3. Destroy the USA 2:15
4. Ephedrine Blue 2:16
5. So Stupid 2:09
6. Sex Objects 2:43
7. Killed by Ants 4:09
8. No More Presidents 1:48
9. Shoplifting at Macys 2:23
10. Mystery Pill 2:06
11. Sally I Can't Go to the Beach 2:05
12. Anti-Social 2:35
13. Vitamin Bomb 1:44
14. Life Styles of the Truly Lazy 1:46
