= Internal Salvation =

Studio album by the Unseen
- Released: July 16, 2007
- Recorded: January–March 2007
- Studio: The Outpost, Stoughton, Massachusetts
- Genre: Punk rock
- Length: 30:24
- Label: Hellcat Records
- Producer: Jim Siegal

The Unseen chronology
State of Discontent (2005)	Internal Salvation (2007)

Professional ratings
Review scores
Source	Rating
Allmusic	4/5 stars

Internal Salvation is the sixth full-length studio album of American punk rock band the Unseen. It was released on July 16, 2007. It is the band's second album released via Hellcat Records (subsidiary label of Epitaph Records).

== Track listing ==
1. "Intro (The Brutal Truth)" 1:21
2. "Such Tragedy" (lyrics: Mark music: Scott) 2:18
3. "At Point Break" (lyrics: Mark music: Scott) 1:56
4. "Right Before Your Eyes" (lyrics: Mark music: Scott) 2:09
5. "Torn and Shattered (Nothing Left)" (lyrics: Mark music: Scott & Tripp) 2:45
6. "Break Away" (lyrics: Mark music: Scott) 2:14
7. "Let It Go" (lyrics: Tripp music: Scott & Tripp) 2:40
8. "No Direction" (lyrics: Mark music: Scott) 2:55
9. "In Your Place" (lyrics: Mark music: Scott) 2:49
10. "Left For Dead" (lyrics: Mark music: Ian Galloway & Scott) 2:35
11. "Step Inside...Take Your Life" (lyrics: Mark music: Scott) 1:28
12. "Act the Part" (lyrics & music: Tripp) 2:38
13. "Talking Bombs" (Bill Close, Cliff "Hanger" Croce)¤ 2:38
14. "Still Believe" ×

¤ = Cover of "The Freeze"
× = Bonus track on European CD version

== Personnel ==
- Mark Unseen – lead vocals
- Scott Unseen – lead guitar, vocals
- Tripp Underwood – bass, vocals
- Jonny – rhythm guitar, backing Vocals
- Pat Melzard – drums
- Bill Brown - backing vocals
- Ian Galloway - backing vocals
- Marc Cannata - backing vocals
