= State of Discontent =

Studio album by The Unseen
- Released: May 9, 2005
- Recorded: December 5–25, 2004
- Studios: The Outpost, Stoughton, Massachusetts
- Genre: Punk rock
- Length: 32:04
- Label: Hellcat Records
- Producers: Ken Casey; Brett Gurewitz

The Unseen chronology
| Explode (2003) | State of Discontent (2005) | Internal Salvation (2007) |

State of Discontent is the fifth official album by the punk rock band The Unseen and their first on Hellcat Records, a subsidiary label of Epitaph Records. It was released on May 9, 2005, internationally and a day later on May 10 in the United States. It was produced by Brett Gurewitz of Bad Religion and Ken Casey of the Dropkick Murphys. The album included guest appearances by Lars Frederiksen of Rancid and Dicky Barrett of the Mighty Mighty Bosstones. The final track is a cover version of "Paint It Black" by The Rolling Stones.

== Track listing ==
1. "On the Other Side" (lyrics: Mark music: Scott) 2:34
2. "Scream Out" (lyrics: Mark music: Scott) 2:51
3. "The End Is Near" (lyrics: Mark music: Scott) 1:26
4. "Weapons of Mass Deception" (lyrics: Tripp music: Tripp & Mike "Rufio" Kadomiya) 2:15
5. "You Can Never Go Home" (lyrics & music: Tripp) 2:30
6. "Dead Weight Falls" (lyrics: Mark music: Ian Galloway) 2:50
7. "Force Fed" (lyrics: Mark music: Scott & Tripp) 2:10
8. "Social Damage" (lyrics: Mark music: Scott) 2:13
9. "Waste of Time" (lyrics: Mark music: Scott) 3:07
10. "Hit and Run" (lyrics: Mark music: Mike "Rufio" Kadomiya) 2:10
11. "We Are All That We Have" (lyrics & music: Tripp) 1:41
12. "Flames Have Destroyed" (lyrics: Mark music: Scott) 1:04
13. "Final Execution (Armageddon)" (lyrics: Mark music: Mike "Rufio" Kadomiya) 2:34
14. "Paint It Black" (Rolling Stones cover) 2:34

== Personnel ==
- Mark - Vocals
- Scott - Lead Guitar
- Tripp - Bass, Vocals
- Pat Melzard - Drums
- Mike "Rufio" Kadomiya - Rhythm Guitar (on tracks 4, 10, & 13), Backing Vocals
- Ian Galloway - Rhythm Guitar (on track 6), Backing Vocals
- Laura Casey - Cello, Viola (on track 1)
- Bill Brown - Backing Vocals
- James Lynch - Backing Vocals
- Ken Casey - Backing Vocals
- Lars Frederiksen - Backing Vocals (on track 11)
- Matt Kelly - Backing Vocals
- Dicky Barrett - Backing Vocals (on track 14)
