= Minx (Leatherface album) =

Studio album by Leatherface
- Released: 1993
- Genre: Hardcore punk emo, melodic hardcore
- Length: 40:23
- Label: Roughneck Records

Leatherface chronology
Mush (1991)	Minx (1993)	The Last (1994)

Professional ratings
Review scores
Source	Rating
AllMusic	3.5/5 stars
The Encyclopedia of Popular Music	3/5 stars

Minx is the fourth album by the English punk rock band Leatherface. It was released in 1993 by Roughneck Records.

== Critical reception ==
Due to its more polished production, it was regarded by some critics as a lesser album than its predecessor, Mush.

Trouser Press wrote that "Stubbs’ grotesquely rough voice still pours out the fury and Leatherface remains an unreservedly mighty force, but there are fewer places where the tuneful roar goes over the deep edge." AllMusic wrote that "as it moves along, Minx sounds a bit too samey, but still sustains the heapin' hooks and super lyrics. A lot of the songs seem ordinary, or not their best, but each has some place -- a chorus, a striking bridge, a well-placed, dramatic buildup -- where it sounds triumphant, or incredibly exciting."

== Track listing ==
1. "Wallflower" - 2:40
2. "Books" - 3:06
3. "Fat, Earthy, Flirt" - 3:32
4. "Do the Right Thing" - 3:49
5. "Evil that Men Do" - 2:54
6. "Heaven Sent" - 4:43
7. "Don't Work" - 3:11
8. "A Sad Day Indeed" - 3:36
9. "Skin Deep" - 3:20
10. "Dustbin Modo" - 2:10
11. "A Cartoon (With the Pain)" - 4:08
12. "Pale Moonlight" - 3:29

== Personnel ==
- Dickie Hammond - guitar
- Frankie Stubbs - vocals, guitar
