= BYO Split Series Volume II =

Studio album by Swingin' Utters and Youth Brigade
- Released: October 26, 1999
- Recorded: August–September 1999
- Genre: Punk rock
- Length: 29:19
- Label: BYO (BYO 065)
- Producer: Steve Kravac

BYO Split Series chronology
Volume I (1999)	BYO Split Series Volume II (1999)	Volume III (2002)

Swingin' Utters chronology
Brazen Head E.P. (1999)	BYO Split Series Volume II (1999)	Teen Idol Eyes (1999)

Youth Brigade chronology
Out of Print (1998)	BYO Split Series Volume II (1999)	A Best of Youth Brigade (2002)

Professional ratings
Review scores
Source	Rating
AllMusic	3/5 stars

BYO Split Series Volume II is the second album in the BYO Split Series, featuring Swingin' Utters and Youth Brigade.

== Track listing ==
Swingin' Utters
No.	Title	Writer(s)	Length
1.	"Angels Pissing on Your Head"		2:06
2.	"You Haven't Seen Yourself in Years"		3:48
3.	"Mother of the Mad"		1:59
4.	"The Courage of a Younger Pope"		2:07
5.	"Troubadour"		1:50
6.	"'39" (originally performed by Queen)	Brian May	3:19

Youth Brigade
No.	Title	Length
7.	"Where Are All the Old Man Bars"	2:10
8.	"Fuck You"	1:24
9.	"Alright Then"	2:26
10.	"Reason Why"	2:25
11.	"It's Not Like That Anymore"	2:05
12.	"Let Them Know"	3:40
Total length:		29:19
