= BYO Split Series Volume III =

Studio album by NOFX and Rancid
- Released: March 5, 2002
- Genre: Punk rock
- Length: 26:57
- Label: BYO
- Producer: Rancid, Ryan Greene

BYO Split Series chronology
Volume II (1999)	BYO Split Series Volume III (2002)	Volume IV (2002)

NOFX chronology
Surfer (2001)	BYO Split Series Volume III (2002)	45 or 46 Songs That Weren't Good Enough to Go on Our Other Records (2002)

Rancid chronology
Rancid (2000)	BYO Split Series Volume III (2002)	Indestructible (2003)

Professional ratings
Review scores
Source	Rating
AllMusic	4/5 stars
Ox-Fanzine	Mixed
Punknews.org	4/5 stars
Sputnikmusic	4.5/5
Robert Christgau	(3-star Honorable Mention)

BYO Split Series Volume III is a split album featuring the American punk rock bands Rancid and NOFX. It was released on March 5, 2002 through BYO Records' as the third entry in their BYO Split Series.

The album contains six songs by each band, with each band's songs being covers of songs originally performed by the other band.

Two versions of this CD were released. One with a green cover, which had the songs performed by NOFX followed by the songs performed by Rancid, and one with an orange cover, which placed Rancid's songs ahead of NOFX's (the order of the songs by each band remains identical).

Following the album's release, NOFX's cover of Radio evolved into a live staple having been played at multiple NOFX shows ever since.

== Track listing ==
NOFX (all songs originally performed by Rancid; all songs written by Tim Armstrong, except where noted)
No.	Title	Writer(s)	Length
1.	"I'm the One"		1:52
2.	"Olympia WA"		3:00
3.	"Tenderloin"	Tim Armstrong, Matt Freeman	1:26
4.	"Antennas"		1:21
5.	"Corazon de Oro"		3:11
6.	"Radio"	Tim Armstrong, Billie Joe Armstrong, Freeman	2:54

Rancid (all songs originally performed by NOFX and written by Fat Mike.)
No.	Title	Lead vocals	Length
7.	"Moron Bros"	Tim Armstrong	1:56
8.	"Stickin' in My Eye"	Lars Frederiksen	1:51
9.	"Bob"	Tim Armstrong	2:03
10.	"Don't Call Me White"	Freeman	2:47
11.	"Brews"	Frederiksen	2:08
12.	"Vanilla Sex"		2:28
Total length:			26:57

== Personnel ==
Personnel taken from BYO Split Series Volume III CD booklet.

Rancid

- Tim Armstrong – guitar, vocals
- Lars Frederiksen – guitar, vocals
- Matt Freeman – bass, vocals
- Brett Reed – drums

NOFX

- Fat Mike
- El Hefe
- Eric Melvin
- Erik "Smelly" Sandin

Additional musicians

- Mad Caddies – backing vocals (tracks 1–6)
- Sascha Lazor – guitar (track 6)
- Ronnie King – Hammond organ (tracks 1–6)
