= Hit for Six (album) =

Studio album by Consumed
- Released: 2 November 1999
- Recorded: November 1998 – May 1999
- Genres: Punk rock, melodic hardcore, skate punk
- Length: 33:51
- Label: Fat Wreck Chords
- Producer: Andy Sneap

Consumed chronology
Breakfast at Pappa's EP (1998)	Hit for Six (1999)	Pistols at Dawn (2002)

Professional ratings
Review scores
Source	Rating
AllMusic	3/5 stars
Punknews.org	4.5/5 stars
Rock Hard	7/10

Hit for Six is the first full-length studio album by the English punk rock band Consumed. It was released in November 1999 on the American independent label Fat Wreck Chords.

== Critical reception ==
Exclaim! wrote: "England's cricket-loving answer to Pennywise follow up their debut EP, Breakfast at Poppa's, with 14 heavy-hitting and oh-so melodic SoCal-inspired punk anthems."

AllMusic called the album "a searing swarm of hardcore guitars and drums" and "explosive metal-tinged punk."

== Track listing ==
- All tracks written by Consumed
1. "Sunny Side Up" – 2:29
2. "On the Take Again" – 2:01
3. "Wake Up with a Smile" – 2:45
4. "King Kong Song" – 3:08
5. "Nicky Fry" – 1:51
6. "Something to Do" – 1:50
7. "Lead the Way" – 2:23
8. "Twat Called Maurice" – 2:40
9. "Butterside Down" – 2:29
10. "Do the Duchess" – 2:26
11. "Chop Suicide" – 2:33
12. "Promoter Head" – 1:49
13. "Black and Blue" – 2:57
14. "Start Living" – 2:30

== Credits ==
- Steve Ford – guitar, vocals
- Mike Ford – guitar, vocals
- Baz Barrett – bass guitar
- Chris Billam – drums
- Produced and engineered by Andy Sneap
