= Fill Your Boots =

Studio album by Leatherface
- Released: 1990
- Genre: Hardcore punk
- Label: Meantime

Leatherface chronology
Cherry Knowle (1989)	Fill Your Boots (1990)	Mush (1991)

Fill Your Boots is the second full-length album by the English punk band Leatherface.

== Critical reception ==
Professional ratings
Review scores
Source	Rating
AllMusic	4.5/5 stars
The Encyclopedia of Popular Music	3/5 stars
Select	3/5

Trouser Press deemed the album both "dispensable" and "fine," writing that it added "nothing especially exciting to the genre." The Encyclopedia of Popular Music wrote that "fast and abrasive tracks ... demonstrated [Leatherface's] grip of hardcore dynamics and pop sensibilities."

== Track listing ==
1. "New York State" - 3:53
2. "Razorblades and Aspirin" - 2:30
3. "Speak in Tongues" - 3:19
4. "Fate" - 3:02
5. "Peasant in Paradise" - 3:12
6. "The Bastards Can't Dance" - 3:53
7. "Our Father" - 3:14
8. "Leatherface" - 2:50
9. "All I Wanted" - 3:04
10. "Here Comes the Judge" - 4:54
11. "In the Ghetto" - 2:54
12. "Candle in the Wind" - 2:13
