= Beaumont Street Studios =

English nonprofit community music centre and radio station

Coordinates: 53.648224°N 1.782054°W

Beaumont Street Studios (BSS) was an English nonprofit community music centre and radio station. Founded in 1985 by the Huddersfield West Indian Association, it closed in 2010.

== History ==
Beaumont Street Studios was established by the nonprofit organisation Huddersfield West Indian Association in 1985. The organisation was inspired by the black neighborhood's social issues and unemployment. Beaumont Street Studios received funding from the New Deal, New Labour initiatives that aimed to help the unemployed find work. During their 1999–2000 budget year, Beaumont Street Studios had revenue of roughly half a million pounds.

At its inception, Beaumont Street Studios had an eight-track recording facility on Beaumont Street at Hudawi Centre. In 1993, Hudawi Centre was destroyed in a fire. The prior year, they had started building a 24-track studio nearby, which they started using after the fire. It later moved to St Peter's Chambers. Its recording studios were used by the bands Chumbawamba, Embrace, Four Day Hombre, The Mission, Shed Seven, The Sisters of Mercy, and Terrorvision.

The organisation closed in 2010 and was liquidated through the sale of musical accessories like as mixing consoles and laptops. It had a remaining debt of £112,000.

== Creative FM ==
Creative FM
- England
- Broadcast area: (United Kingdom) Huddersfield, UK (restricted service licence); Worldwide (webcast)
- Frequency: 107.1 MHz

Programming
- Format: Music radio

Ownership
- Owner: Beaumont Street Studios

History
- First air date: 14 June 2004

Links
- Website: www.creativefm.net

Creative FM was a community radio station based at Beaumont Street Studios in Huddersfield, England. The broadcasting frequency is 107.1 FM. In addition to broadcasting in English, the station also had broadcasts in Punjabi, Hindi, Gujarati, and Urdu.

Creative FM began broadcasting on 14 June 2004. The station broadcast under a restricted service licence. On 11 July 2004, Creative FM started broadcasting every day of the week 24 hours a day.
