= Steal Yer Heart =

Studio album by The Briefs
- Released: October 18, 2005
- Genre: Punk rock

The Briefs chronology
Sex Objects (2004)	Steal Yer Heart (2005)	Platinum Rats (2019)

Steal Yer Heart is an album released by The Briefs on October 18, 2005. It was the first album recorded with Kicks on bass.

== Track listing ==
1. Genital General 1:58
2. Criminal Youth 3:09
3. Move Too Slow 1:32
4. Lint Fabrik 2:30
5. Getting Hit on at the Bank 2:38
6. Stuck on You 2:23
7. I Can't Work 1:46
8. Can't Get Through 2:06
9. My Girl (Wants to Be a Zombie) 1:12
10. Normal Jerks 3:20
11. Forty and Above 2:08
12. Razorblade Heart 3:45
