= Where the Sun Never Sets =

Studio album by A Global Threat
- Released: February 7, 2006
- Recorded: August 15–30, 2005
- Genre: Hardcore punk, Punk
- Length: 33:35
- Label: BYO Records
- Producer: A Global Threat, Richard Marr

A Global Threat chronology
Earache / Pass the Time (2003)	Where the Sun Never Sets (2006)

Where the Sun Never Sets is the fourth and final studio album by A Global Threat. It was released in 2006 on BYO Records. It is the most musically innovative of all their albums, moving even further from the street punk sound of their first two.

The album was rated 3.5 out of 5 stars by AllMusic.

== Track listing ==
All tracks are written by A Global Threat.

No.	Title	Length
1.	"AGT Crew"	2:32
2.	"Scalped by Pop"	1:00
3.	"Keep Dancing"	1:16
4.	"Cut-Ups"	2:06
5.	"Some Nerve"	1:42
6.	"Stuck in the Skull"	2:20
7.	"The Running Man"	2:35
8.	"Making Enemies"	1:58
9.	"Free Will"	3:01
10.	"Set Up"	1:58
11.	"One Way Street"	2:05
12.	"Not a Dime to Drop"	1:52
13.	"Friendly Fire"	2:06
14.	"Channel 34"	1:00
15.	"Everything Is Wonderful"	1:34
16.	"Not Those Kids"	1:04
17.	"I Don't Want It All"	2:35
18.	"AGT End"	0:58
Total length:		33:35

== Lineup for recording ==
- Bryan Lothian - vocals and guitar
- John Curran - bass and vocals
- Mike Graves - drums guitar

== Additional personnel ==
- AGT Choir - additional vocals
- Arya Zahedi - vocals on track 3
- Mark Civitarese - vocals on track 5 and 14
- Brian Riley - vocals on track 8
- Nick Cahalane - vocals on track 12
- Phil Goldenberg - guitar on track 13
- Mike Kadomiya, Dug Moore - vocals on track 15

Engineered by Richard Marr
Mixed and produced by Richard and A Global Threat
Mastered by Jeff Lipton
