= Off the Charts =

- US Release Cover

Studio album by The Briefs
- Released: 2003
- Genre: Punk rock
- Label: Dirtnap Records
- Producer: Martin Feveyear

The Briefs chronology
Hit After Hit (2000)	Off the Charts (2003)	Sex Objects (2004)

Off the Charts is the second full album by American punk rock band The Briefs. It was released in the US and the UK in 2003 on CD, and gatefold and white vinyl.

The song "(Looking Through) Gary Glitter's Eyes" is a nod to The Adverts' 1977 song "Gary Gilmore's Eyes", and references disgraced pop star Gary Glitter.

== Track listing ==
1. Outer Space (Doesn't Care About You) 1:18
2. (Looking Through) Gary Glitter's Eyes 2:31
3. Ain't It the Truth 2:37
4. Piss On the Youth 1:36
5. Tear It in Two 3:24
6. We Americans 2:05
7. Who Made You So Smart? 1:10
8. 22nd Century Man 2:31
9. Ouch Ouch Ouch 2:06
10. Ludlow St. 2:20
11. Soozy 2:13

(UK Version)

10. (Like A) Heart Attack
11. She's Abrasive
12. Love And Ulcers
