= Kosher Gym =

Fitness club in Brooklyn, New York City

- Industry: Health club
- Founded: 1999
- Founder: David Moshe
- Defunct: 2010
- Successor: Eneryz Fitness
- Headquarters: Brooklyn, United States
- Areas served: Brooklyn and Lakewood
- Key people: Yehuda Fulda
- Number of employees: 92 (2009)

Kosher Gym was a fitness club on Coney Island Avenue in the Midwood section of Flatbush, Brooklyn, that catered to Orthodox Jews in New York by, among other things, offering separate facilities for men and women. In 2008 the club was sold to Energize Fitness of Cheyenne, Wyoming, which then purchased another similar club in Lakewood, New York, Trim Gym, branding both as Energize in an attempt to create a national franchise. However, the company closed both locations a year after the acquisition.

== History ==
David Moshe from Israel founded The Kosher Gym in 1999. He saw a need for Jewish and religious men and women to be healthy and fit, but these people would not go to "typical gyms” because of the immodest atmosphere according to Orthodox standards. The Hebrew motto "a healthy mind and a healthy body" was painted on the walls. Moshe called it Kosher Gym, a play on the word “כושר” which means fitness in Hebrew and also played along with the theme of being a "kosher" place to work out. It advertised as "the only kosher gym in the world".

The Kosher Gym started in a renovated car garage on Coney Island in Brooklyn with separate hours for men and women. Only instrumental music was played, only CNN was shown on the club televisions, the fruit juice was kosher, frosted glass prevented passers-by from observing those working out inside, and tapes of rabbinical lessons and "Jewish Techno" were available for members' use while working out.

In late 2002 Kosher Gym was experiencing financial difficulties and Moshe found an investor, a local businessman, Yehuda Fulda to purchase Kosher Gym. Fulda then reincorporated Kosher Gym as KG Fitness. He changed the focus to a health and fitness club and the logo from a set of dumbbells to a running man and leased a second building a block away at 1716 Coney Island that he built as a luxury all women's facility. This enabled the gym to flourish as it now had two independent full-time facilities.

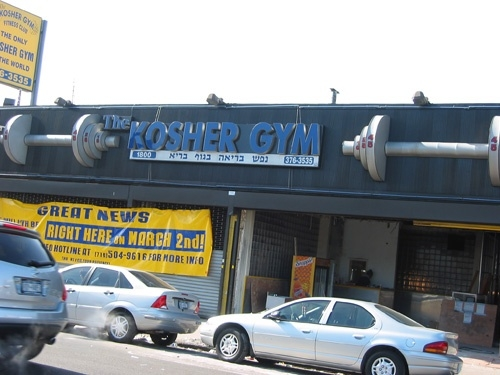
Original Kosher Gym

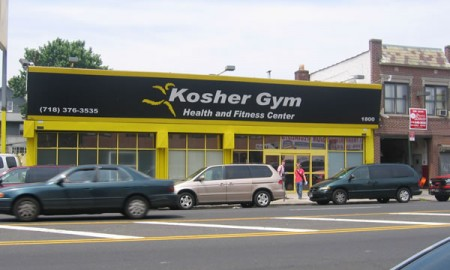
Kosher Gym after rebranding

The all women's gym was enthusiastically received by the community and added thousands of new members to the gym, outgrowing the new facility. Less than 2 years later KG Fitness built a new facility for women over three times the size across the street from the men's facility.

By 2007 KG fitness had grown to over 5,000 members, and Fulda decided that it would be more efficient to have one large facility with separate facilities for men and women. This would enable KG to consolidate a lot of its staff, and save money. In 2007 both facilities were moved to a large 25,000 square foot facility on McDonald Ave.

== Controversy ==
In the new facility on McDonald, KG invested highly in technology to enable fewer staff. One of the major components was a biometric scanning system that granted members access the club. It also enabled KG to monitor and restrict members to specific parts of the club.

While in the past the women's exercise classes - which since club's inception were a supplement to the membership cost, could now be monitored. Now, the past "honor system" became an enforced system. Members who had been abusing the system, now had to pay. Some members objected to paying for classes, which they claimed had been included in their memberships. Fulda installed a turnstile and fingerprint reader at the entrance to the building and classes, and posted a sign threatening a $500 fine and membership termination for those bypassing them; twelve people were caught on camera doing so. Those caught in a class for which they had not paid were required either to pay retroactive class fees or to sign an affidavit that it was the first time they had attended and warned that video records would be searched and they would be charged for the cost of the investigation if the statement was found to be untrue.

In 2008 Fulda who had lost millions of dollars on Kosher Gym, decided to sell. He found a buyer in a national club operator, later revealed to be Energize Fitness of Cheyenne, Wyoming, who would continue operating gender-separate clubs but make changes including opening on the Sabbath, using advertising depicting women, and having "immodestly" dressed staff. Many of the members, who had already reacted negatively to the hiring of non-Jewish staff, objected to the changes and resented not being released from their membership contracts. Fulda called purchasing the fitness center "a mistake".

Members filed complaints with the New York Attorney General's office, although after an extensive investigation the only violation found was a failure to post a notice of bond as required by state law.

Energize purchased a similar club in Lakewood, New York, Trim Gym, branding both as Energize in an attempt to create a national franchise, but closed both locations a year later, at which time there were approximately 6,000 members in the 25,000 square foot facility in Brooklyn and the Lakewood location.
