= Hit After Hit =

Studio album by The Briefs
- Released: April 24, 2000
- Studio: Jupiter Studio, Seattle, WA
- Genre: Punk rock
- Length: 21:02
- Label: Dirtnap Records
- Producer: Martin Feveyear

The Briefs chronology
Hit After Hit (2000)	Off the Charts (2003)

Professional ratings
Review scores
Source	Rating
Kerrang!	4/5 stars

Hit After Hit is the debut album from The Briefs, released in 2000 on both CD and white, red, pink, and clear vinyl.

== Track listing ==
1. Poor and Weird 2:15
2. Run the Other Way 1:58
3. Silver Bullet 1:08
4. Rotten Love 3:34
5. I'm a Raccoon 1:02
6. Sylvia 1:38
7. Where Did He Go? 2:19
8. New Shoes 2:10
9. Knife 1:45
10. Year Long Summer 1:14
11. New Case 2:44
12. Big Dog 1:55
13. Dolly Parton 0:34
