= Yehuda Fulda =

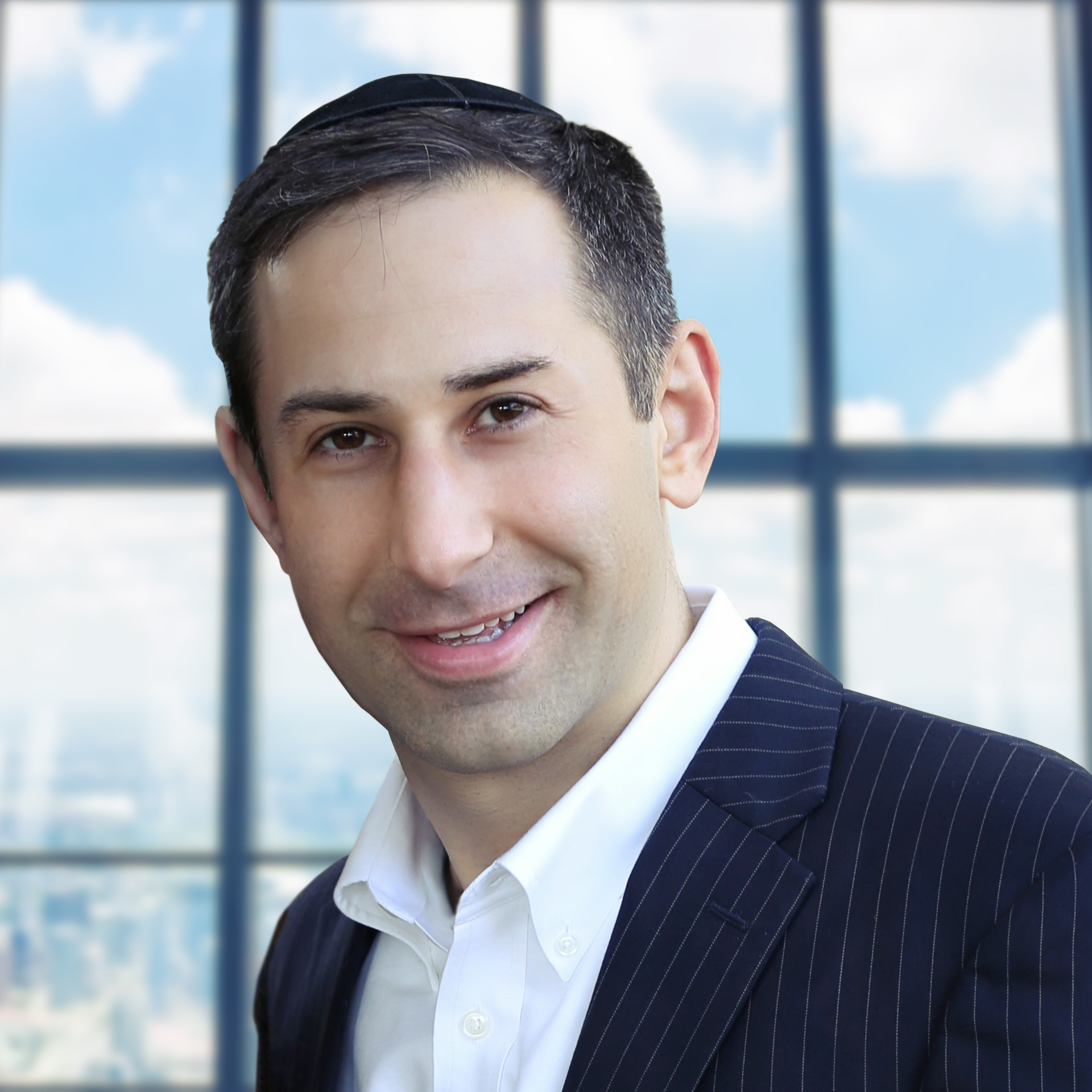
- Yehuda Fulda
- Born: New York City, United States
- Education: University of Maryland

Yehuda Fulda is a businessman involved in various ventures in the US, UK, Italy and Israel. He is a managing partner of TGX Holdings, a diversified holding company that includes real estate, consumer goods, telecom and venture capital.

== Education ==
Born in New York City, Fulda attended Talmudical Academy in Baltimore and University of Maryland.

== Professional life ==
Prior to his 18th birthday, Yehuda Fulda worked for New York Life as a licensed Insurance Agent while attending college. He was one of the youngest agents to work for NY Life. Realizing that he could make a lot more sales by leveraging other brokers, Fulda hired two telemarketers to set appointments and gave the appointments to other agents to visit, splitting the commission with them. NY Life did not agree with Fulda’s methods for success and he left the company soon after.

A year later Fulda left to open his own telemarketing firm in Woodlawn, Maryland specializing in fundraising for various charities. Within a year the firm grew to 250 telemarketers in three locations.

Fulda saw the telecommunications industry booming and wanted to convert his call centers to sell long-distance phone service. However, not wanting to lose his charitable fundraising operation, he coordinated with the Maryland Correctional Institution for Women to employ 350 prisoners as telemarketers to do fundraising.

In 2000 the company sold to MCI Worldcom - narrowly missing collapse of the telecom industry, and Fulda focused on funding other business interests of real estate, construction, publishing and health & fitness.

At the age of 27 Fulda decided to partially retire from the business world and focus on teaching Jewish studies. He taught students as Torah Academy of Brooklyn in the morning and acted as President of his company TGX Holdings.

After living in Israel for several years, he saw the need to develop a community for American Olim that had moved to Israel and wanted American style homes and communal settings that they were used to. Together With Rabbi Dovid Gottlieb he started a residential development called GaneI HaEla in Ramat Beit Shemesh.

== Books ==
Fulda published a book on Telemarketing, The Art Of Telemarketing which serves as a guide to building and operating call centers.

== Controversy ==
In late 2002 Fulda purchased The Kosher Gym in New York. After losing over two million on the investment, he sold to another fitness club operator, Energyz Fitness. This was controversial. An Attorney General investigation was opened and found no wrongdoing on behalf of the gym except for a technicality of failing to post a bond sign. Fulda called buying the gym "a mistake".
