= The Briefs =

American punk rock band

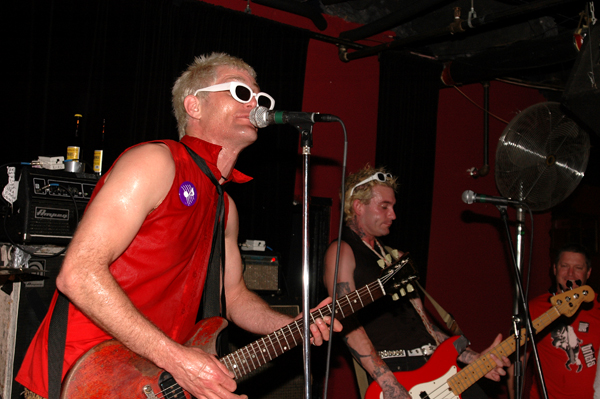
- The Briefs performing in San Francisco, U.S., in 2006

Background information
- Origin: Seattle, Washington, U.S.
- Genre: Punk rock
- Years active: 2000–present
- Labels: BYO, Dirtnap
- Members: Steve E. Nix; Shaun Cassidy Jr; Chris Brief; Stevie Kicks; Daniel J. Travanti

The Briefs are an American punk rock band from Seattle, Washington, formed in 2000 and originally consisting of Daniel J. Travanti (guitar/vocals), Steve Ross, performing as Steve E. Nix (guitar/vocals), Lance Romance (bass/vocals), and Chris Brief (drums/vocals). They released their first full-length album, Hit After Hit, in October 2000 via Dirtnap Records. The band was courted by and reportedly signed with major label Interscope Records, following their 2002 release of Off the Charts, but that deal fell through. The Briefs surfaced on California's BYO Records with the release of 2004's Sex Objects and the reissue of their Dirtnap-era full lengths. They most recently released Steal Yer Heart in 2005. The Briefs have released a prolific number of 7" singles during their career, on several small independent labels.

In 2004, the Briefs went on a European tour without Lance Romance, who stayed behind to get his GED. In his place went bassist Steve Kicks of Vancouver, British Columbia's band New Town Animals. Lance rejoined the line-up for the 2004 release party of Sex Objects, but retired from the band in 2005. Kicks has since become a permanent addition and was a full member for the follow-up album, Steal Yer Heart.

The Sex Objects single "Orange Alert" gained notoriety as a seething criticism of the Bush administration and of the culture of fear in post-9/11 America. It is one of a number of their songs critical of the U.S. Government, including "No More Presidents" and "Destroy The USA" from Sex Objects, and "We Americans" from Off the Charts. The band has also written a number of love songs in a consciously off-kilter style, similar to the Buzzcocks' "Orgasm Addict". With songs such as "Dolly Parton", the band has also illustrated their penchant for light-hearted absurdity.

In 2007, the Briefs released a feature-length documentary about the band, entitled The Greatest Story Ever Told, which was directed by the punk filmmaker Lewis Smithingham.

The Briefs went on indefinite hiatus while Chris Brief went to Berlin and Travanti relocated to California and joined two other bands. The first band, Modern Action, consisting of Travanti and members of the bands The Bodies and The Shifters, recorded two 7" singles, "Modern Action" backed with "Bleeding Red" (2007), and "Radioactive Boy" backed with "Problem Child" (2009), as well as a full-length LP/CD, Molotov Solution (2010), all of which were released on Modern Action Records, a label that Travanti co-founded. The second band, called Sharp Objects, released a 7" single entitled "Zero Ambition" in 2010 in the vein of early 80s LA punk and a full-length eponymously titled album in 2011, also through Modern Action Records.

Nix and Kicks both play in another band called Steve E. Nix and The Cute Lepers, playing a very similar style of music to that of The Briefs, with some added power-pop drive. In 2007, they released a 7" single of the song "Terminal Boredom", backed with "Prove It", on 1-2-3-4 Go! Records, which also released their two albums, Smart Accessories in 2009 and Adventure Time in 2011.

In 2005, The Briefs released a CD called Singles Only, which contained all of the songs released on their different 7" releases to date. In 2012, Modern Action Records re-released Singles Only as a box set with five 7" records containing all of the songs from the original release. The box set also contained a cassette tape including the first six demo songs recorded by The Briefs in 1999. Some additional content was added in the digital download, including a more recent 7", "The Joy of Killing", totaling up to 32 songs of Briefs history.

In the fall of 2012, The Briefs played a show in Long Beach, California, with The Stitches and The Bodies. They performed with original bassist Lance Romance but drummer Chris Brief was replaced by the Adolescents drummer, Armando Del Rio, when Brief was unable to return from Germany in time for the show. The band then went on to play in Texas at the Fun Fun Fun Festival two days later before slipping back into a dormant state.

The Briefs toured again in 2018 and 2019, playing their first London gig in more than a decade, followed by a new album Platinum Rats, released by UK label Damaged Goods in 2019. A fall tour in support of the Dead Boys was scheduled for 2022. The Briefs toured with fellow Seattle-based punk band Fan Club (formerly LYSOL).

== Members ==
=== Current members ===
- Steve E. Nix – guitar, vocals (2000–present)
- Daniel J. Travanti – guitar, vocals (2000–present)
- Lance Romance – bass, vocals (2000–2004, 2024–present)
- Chris Brief – drums, vocals (2000–present)

==== Touring members ====
- Armando Del Rio – drums (2012)
- Ian Ferocious – drums (2024–present)

=== Former members ===
- Stevie Kicks – bass, vocals (2005–2023)

== Discography ==
- Hit After Hit (2000)
- Off the Charts (2003)
- Sex Objects (2004)
- Singles Only (2004)
- Steal Yer Heart (2005)
- The Greatest Story Ever Told: DVD & CD (2007)
- Singles Only Box Set (2012)
- Platinum Rats (2019)

== Equipment ==
- Steve and Dan both take pride in using vintage gear. Steve plays a 1960 Gibson Les Paul Junior. During the earlier years he used to play with .11 gauge strings. Later he would switch to pure nickel "super slinky" or .09 gauge guitar strings. Heavily used in the seventies, these, along with his heavy gauge of pick (.88 Green Tortex to be exact), give him the raunchy 1977 tone many search for.
- Dan has also been seen with vintage gear including a Fender Jazzmaster with matching headstock (indicating it was a much older, late 60s or early 70s model). However, Dan has also played many other guitars including a Vintage Les Paul Custom and these days is rarely seen without his vintage Gibson SG Junior.
- The reasoning for the heavy use of "Junior" Gibson guitars is mainly due to three key factors, one being the vintage "dogear" P-90 pickup. The P-90 forms an interesting combination of single coil "twang" and humbucker "beef", producing a sound that cannot easily be categorized. The mid-frequencies are usually very, very strong and bass is underemphasized. When played with modest gain and high volume, the pickup distorts itself due to the distance between the strings (they are surface mounted) as well as the pickup's overall output. In a sense, the P90 is a super-beefed up single coil. Another key factor is the wrap-around bridge. While they are not original (they replaced the original bridges with new wrap-arounds that had two adjustable saddles), the bridges create a great deal of tone characteristic as well as greater sustain. The key element to these guitars are their designs. Both include heavy fret access (The SG and Double Cut are almost identical in that nearly every fret can be accessed, unlike Gibson's traditional Single Cut Les Paul), light bodies, a slab of mahogany (Gibson's vintage guitars used much more prestigious pieces of wood), and, most importantly, they have little distractions in the way of playing so Dan and Steve can slam away at notes without flicking a tone switch out of socket or injuring themselves on a sharp bridge saddle.
- Effects used by the Briefs include an Ibanez Tube Screamer (Not the reissue, the traditional TS-9), a Boss "Super Chorus", and Boss Graphic Equalizer.
- Spare guitars on stage have included a Fender (American, Blonde) Telecaster with maple neck, and some pictures have shown a standard SG being played as well. Steve has also been seen with a Traditional Les Paul "Special" Cherry Red double cutaway guitar.
- Amplifiers include a vintage Orange amp head and a Fender Bassman. Cabinets used include vintage Marshall cabinets. Steve once stated he used an Ampeg as well, but that it was too large for touring.
- Dan can be seen playing a Rickenbacker 360 during the "Steal yer Heart" sessions and Steve has also been seen with Fender Stratocasters and Telecasters over the years.
