= Pistols at Dawn (Consumed album) =

Studio album by Consumed
- Released: 29 October 2002
- Genre: Punk rock, melodic hardcore
- Length: 37:48
- Label: Golf/BYO Records
- Producer: Andy Sneap

Consumed chronology
Hit for Six (1999)	Pistols at Dawn (2002)	A Decade of No (2018)

Professional ratings
Review scores
Source	Rating
Allmusic	not rated, no review link

Pistols at Dawn is the second full-length album by the English punk rock band, Consumed. It was their first for Golf Records and was distributed by BYO Records after having recorded two releases on Fat Wreck Chords, but the band split up shortly afterwards. The album contains excerpts from the movies Army of Darkness, Darkman and Love and Death.

Zero Magazine reviewer Che Brooks said "Pistols at Dawn is a rabid romp through melody and good cheer".

== Track listing ==
- All tracks written by Consumed
1. "Not Today" – 2:56
2. "Ready to Strike" – 3:25
3. "Gutbuster" – 2:20
4. "Take it on the Chin" – 2:11
5. "Home Again" – 2:38
6. "Glory Hole" – 3:44
7. "Same Way Twice" – 2:47
8. "Gentle Persuasion" – 2:09
9. "Odd Man Out" – 3:00
10. "Out on Your Own" – 2:50
11. "Hello Sailor" – 2:40
12. "A.O.T." – 3:53
13. "Heavy Metal Winner (instrumental version)" – 3:15

== Credits ==
- Steve Ford – guitar, vocals
- Will Burchell – guitar
- Wes Wasley – bass guitar, vocals
- Chris Billam – drums
- Produced and engineered by Andy Sneap
