= Mush (album) =

Studio album by Leatherface
- Released: 1991
- Recorded: May 1991, the Greenhouse (London N1)
- Genres: Hardcore punk; punk rock; melodic hardcore; emocore
- Length: 45:53
- Labels: Roughneck (original release), Seed (U.S. re-release)

Leatherface chronology
Fill Your Boots (1990)	Mush (1991)	Minx (1993)

Professional ratings
Review scores
Source	Rating
Allmusic	4.5/5 stars
Christgau's Consumer Guide	(neither)
Metal Hammer	5/5 stars
New Musical Express	8/10
Select	4/5 stars

Mush is the third full-length album by the English punk band Leatherface. It was originally released only in Britain on Roughneck, a subsidiary of Fire Records, in 1991. It was re-released on Seed Records, an offshoot of Atlantic Records, in 1993, in an unsuccessful attempt to capitalize on the popularity of Nirvana in the United States.

The Guardian called it an album "which has influenced every hardcore, post-hardcore, call it what you want, punk group that exists anywhere across the globe." Kerrang rated it as one of the 50 best albums of 1991.

In 2012, Sarah Anderson of NME named it one of "20 lost albums ripe for rediscovery", and the same magazine named it the 49th best album of 1991 in 2016.

== Track listing ==
All songs written by Frankie Stubbs, except where noted.

1. "I Want the Moon" (Stubbs, Dickie Hammond) - 2:49
2. "How Lonely" - 2:39
3. "I Don't Want to Be the One to Say It" (Stubbs, Hammond) - 2:34
4. "Pandora's Box" (Stubbs, Hammond) - 3:01
5. "Not a Day Goes By" - 2:38
6. "Not Superstitious" - 4:19
7. "Springtime" (Stubbs, Hammond) - 3:19
8. "Winning" - 1:59
9. "In the Real World" (Stubbs, Hammond) - 2:23
10. "Baked Potato" (Stubbs, Hammond) - 3:17
11. "Bowl of Flies" - 2:58
12. "Dead Industrial Atmosphere" - 4:03

Bonus tracks on the CD re-release:

1. "Trenchfoot" - 3:00
2. "Scheme of Things" - 3:20
3. "Message in a Bottle" (Sting) - 3:34 (cover version of original by The Police)
