= What the Fuck Will Change? =

Studio album by A Global Threat
- Released: July 4, 2000
- Recorded: November 1998 – June 1999
- Studio: Music Box Studios, ME
- Genre: Hardcore punk, Street punk
- Length: 25:21
- Label: Step 1 Records, Punk Core Records

A Global Threat chronology
What the Fuck Will Change? (1998)	What the Fuck Will Change? (2000)	Until We Die (2000)

What the Fuck Will Change? is the first studio album by A Global Threat. It was originally released in 2000 by Step 1 Records and was re-released on September 23, 2002, by Punk Core Records with two more tracks.

== Track listing ==
All tracks are written by A Global Threat, except where noted below

No.	Title	Writer(s)	Length
1.	"Religious Scam"		1:52
2.	"Idle Threats"		1:33
3.	"All We Really Own"		1:18
4.	"False Patriot"	Scott Webber	1:36
5.	"Stop the Violence"		1:53
6.	"The Proles"	Brett Threat	1:24
7.	"Live for Now"	Brett Threat	3:04
8.	"The Power"		1:01
9.	"Cause for Abortion"	Brett Threat	1:11
10.	"This Town"	Brett Threat	1:19
11.	"Kids Will Revolt"		0:23
12.	"Conformity"		2:13
13.	"American Culture"		1:33
14.	"What's Left Now?"		3:08
15.	"Who's to Blame?"		2:01
Total length:			25:21

Tracks 1–8 are the original songs for the What the Fuck Will Change? CD EP on ADD Records.
Tracks 2, 8, and 9 were released as the songs on the split EP with The Broken on Controlled Conscience Records.
Tracks 10–13 are previously unreleased outtakes from the Until We Die studio sessions. Different versions of these appear on The Kids Will Revolt.
Tracks 14 and 15 appear only on the 2002 Punk Core release of the album. They were previously released on the split EP with The End on Anarchrist Records. A different version of "Who's to Blame?" appears on Until We Die.

== Original track listing ==
1. "Religious Scam"
2. "Idle Threats"
3. "All We Really Own"
4. "False Patriot"
5. "Stop the Violence"
6. "The Proles"
7. "Live for Now"
8. "The Power"
9. "We're Not Gonna Take It" (Twisted Sister cover)

== Line up for recording ==
- Bryan – vocals
- Mark – vocals
- Pete – guitar
- Brett Threat – bass guitar (tracks 1–9)
- Gabe Astard – bass guitar (tracks 10–15)
- Mike – drums

Engineered by Dave Tarbox
