= The Unseen (band) =

American street punk band

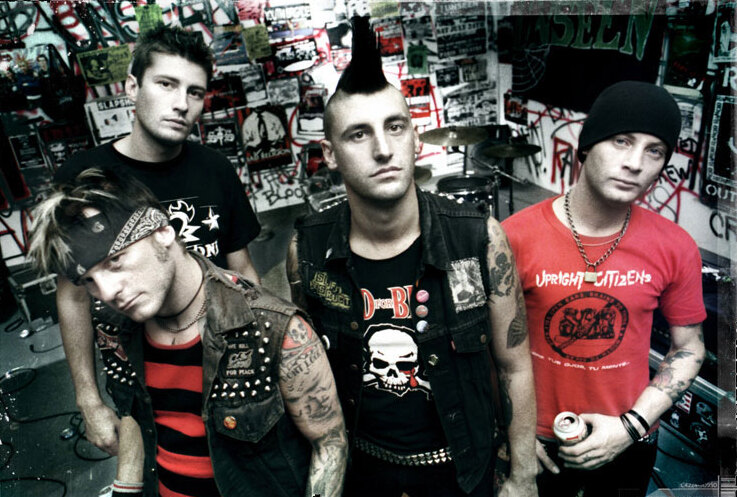

Background information
- Origin: Hingham, Massachusetts, U.S.
- Genres: Punk
- Years active: 1993–present
- Labels: Hellcat; A-F; BYO
- Members: Mark Unseen; Tripp Underwood; Scott Unseen; Robert Falzano; Jonny
- Past members: Paul Russo; Marc Carlson; Brian "Chainsaw" Riley; Ian Galloway

The Unseen is an American punk rock band from Hingham, Massachusetts. They are one of the more prominent bands to revive street punk.

== History ==
The first incarnation of The Unseen was formed in Hingham, Massachusetts, in 1993 after drummer Mark Civitarese, bassist Tripp Underwood, and guitarist Paul Morey parted ways with the singer of their previous band, The Extinct.

In search of a replacement lead singer, local varsity hockey star Marc Carlson was recruited, the band played their first show at an event known as Hagapolozza, Morey soon lost interest in playing guitar and left the group not long after, Phil Reily was brought in as a replacement, but he was dismissed after a show at the Cape Cod hard rock club, the Approach, local guitarist Scott Hadyia was offered to join, after a few practices, he joined the group, the band soon recorded their first "7", "Too Young to Know to Reckless to Care", after the release of their "7", the band and Carlson parted ways.

Not long after his dismissal, Paul Russo, a long time friend of Tripp started hanging around practices and he was asked to join the band, more shows followed, the band recorded and released two EP's, "Protect and Serve" and "Raise your finger, Raise your Fist", which were released within months of each other, the band began touring up and down the New England area, a year later the band released their first album, Lower Class Crucifixion.

After a few tours, Russo left the band to go play drums in Blanks 77, he was replaced by band roadie, Brian "Chainsaw" Reily, this lineup recorded a few songs that would end up on a split EP with Tom and Boot Boys, and two songs, "System’s Destruction"and "No Evacuation", on a compilation called "Sound of Rebellion", after six months, Russo rejoined the band, keeping Chainsaw on as a singer/3rd Guitarist, after a tour with Anti-Flag, the band parted ways with Chainsaw. They then moved to Boston. Along with other street punk bands, they set out to revive the English street punk sound of the 1980s.

The quintet released a best-of compilation for the European market in June 2000 titled Totally Unseen: The Best of the Unseen, which contained two previously unreleased tracks.

The group's solid early line-up consisted of Tripp on bass guitar and vocals, Scott on lead guitar, Civitarese on drums and vocals and Paul Russo on second guitar and vocals as well as drums and bass guitar during live shows when the band switched instruments for certain songs. Most shows began with Russo and Tripp singing lead, and ended with Russo playing drums and Civitarese singing lead. Russo went on to play in The Pinkerton Thugs as well as a solo project called The Strings. He is currently playing in a punk band called Broken Stereo.

Mark Unseen (real name: Mark Civitarese), who played drums on the band's first few albums, became the lead singer after Russo's departure. He also formed and runs ADD Records. He briefly joined the Boston punk group A Global Threat as a second singer, and recorded the full-length albums What The Fuck Will Change? and Until We Die before deciding to concentrate on his work with The Unseen. However shortly after his departure he and Unseen guitarist Scott with Mike Graves and Peter Curtis (then both members of A Global Threat) formed Self Destruct. They released only one 7-inch EP, entitled Violent Affair, and played fewer than ten shows but the musical style and lyrical content displayed on their one record had great influence on all Unseen music to follow, helping to shape their future sound with Civitarese as lead singer. In 2010, Civitarese started a punk rock band called Ashers and released a 7" vinyl and full-length album Kill Your Master. More recently, Civitarese joined with various member of Boston's hardcore scene to form the hardcore/metal band Tenebrae.

There has been some controversy concerning the band, including allegations that in recent years they have "sold out" and that the band should have stopped after losing Russo and therefore their strong political message. (Russo wrote and sang most of Lower Class Crucifixion, So This Is Freedom? and The Anger and The Truth.) Most widely criticised is that The Unseen have produced music videos to show on commercial music video channels such as GMTV2, a practice looked-down upon in the underground street punk scene which also goes against the political message of the first few albums. Darkbuster, a band from The Unseen's area of origin, even released a joke song called "I Hate The Unseen". Members of Darkbuster and The Unseen are friends.

They have toured Europe, North America, Australia, Japan and Mexico with other punk bands such as The Bouncing Souls and Rancid and decidedly more hardcore bands like Hatebreed and Sick of It All. Since the departure of Russo, the band has used many replacements on tour such as members of The Virus, Strike Anywhere and F-Minus. However, recently, on their MySpace page, The Unseen have included a fifth band member, Jonny Thayer, formerly a guitarist with A Global Threat, who was in the band at the same time as Civitarese.

In 2006, the publication of Underwood's book, So This Is Readin'?, detailed the life and hardships of being in an underground band with dry comedy. It started as a lengthy band history on the band's website, but after a few amusing "chapters" he was contacted by a publishing company to release it in book form.

In May 2006, The Unseen announced on their official website that they would begin writing their sixth full-length studio album during summer that year. The album, Internal Salvation, was released on July 10, 2007. The first song released from that album is titled "Right Before Your Eyes" and was followed up by the "Break Away", for which the band made a music video. In support of the album, the band joined the thirteenth Warped Tour in 2007 and launched a US–Canada tour in March 2008.

The Unseen remained inactive, until May 25, 2013, when they played at Punk Rock Bowling at the Fremont Country Club in Las Vegas. They have continued performing live sporadically since.

== Members ==
- Mark Civitarese (Mark Unseen) - drums, vocals (1993–2003), lead vocals (2003–present)
- Tripp Underwood - bass guitar, vocals (1993–present)
- Scott Unseen - lead guitar, vocals (1993–present)
- Pat Melzard - drums (2003–present)
- Jonny Thayer- rhythm guitar, backing vocals (2006–present)

=== Past members ===
- Paul Russo - vocals, rhythm guitar, bass guitar, drums (1995-1997, 1998–2003)
- Marc Carlson - vocals (1993–1995)
- Brian "Chainsaw" Riley - rhythm guitar, vocals (1997 - 1999)
- Ian Galloway - rhythm guitar, backing vocals (touring, 2003-2004, 2006, 2008)
- Bill Brown - rhythm guitar, backing vocals (touring, 2003–2004)
- Drew Indingaro - rhythm guitar, backing vocals (touring, 2003–2004)
- Mike "Rufio" Kadomiya - rhythm guitar, backing vocals (touring, 2004)
- Mike Authority - rhythm guitar, backing vocals (touring, 2005)

== Discography ==
=== Studio albums ===
- Lower Class Crucifixion (1997) (originally released by VML Records, re-issued in 1998 by A-F Records)
- So This Is Freedom? (1999) (A-F Records)
- The Anger & The Truth (2001) (BYO Records)
- Explode (2003) (BYO Records)
- State of Discontent (2005) (Hellcat Records)
- Internal Salvation (2007) (Hellcat Records)

=== Collections ===
- Totally Unseen: The Best of the Unseen (2000) (Step-1 Records)
- The Complete Singles Collection 1994-2000 (2002) (Punkcore Records)

=== 7" vinyl ===
- Too Young To Know... Too Reckless To Care (1995 Rodent Popsicle Records)
- Protect And Serve (1996 VML records)
- Raise Your Finger Raise Your Fist (1996 VML records)
- Tom and BootBoys Split (1998 Pogo 77 records)
- Boston's Finest - Split with Toxic Narcotic (1998 ADD/Rodent popsicle records)

=== Compilation appearances ===
- 1996: Runt Of The Litter - Boston Punk/Pop (Song: "F.T.W.")
- 1996: I've Got My Friends: Boston - San Francisco Punk Rock Split (Songs: "Oi!(Unseen Class)", "Jaded")
- 1997: Coincidence Or Consequence (Song: "Coincidence Or Consequence")
- 1998: This Is East Coast Punk (Songs: "Social Security", "A.D.D.", "So This Is Freedom?")
- 1998: Skins 'N' Pins (Song: "Stay Gold")
- 1998: The Sound Of Rebellion (Songs: "No Evacuation", "The Systems Destruction", "Alone")
- 2002: Sample This, Too! (Song: "Don’t Look Back")
- 2002: Holidays In The Sun Edition - Punkcore Records - Free 10 Track Sampler (Song: "Stand Up And Fight")
- 2005: Punk-O-Rama-10 (Song: "Dead Weight Falls")

== Music videos ==
- '"False Hope" from Explode
- "Scream Out" from State of Discontent
- "You Can Never Go Home" from State of Discontent
- "Break Away" from Internal Salvation

== In popular culture ==
- The Unseen are used as background music in two skits for the TV series Jackass.
- Mark Unseen makes a cameo appearance in the music video "Used to Be" by fellow Boston punk band The Have Nots.
- The Atlanta-based rapper Pill wears a T-shirt for The Unseen in his music video "Glass".
- A poster of the band is seen in the background in one scene of the movie Superbad.
