= Totaled! =

2002 video game

- Developer: Rage Software
- Publishers: EU: Rage Games; NA: Majesco
- Platforms: Xbox, PlayStation 2
- Release: Xbox: EU: June 7, 2002; NA: July 30, 2002; PlayStation 2: EU: September 27, 2002
- Genre: Vehicular combat
- Modes: Single-player, multiplayer

Totaled!, known in Europe as Crashed for the PlayStation 2 and Crash for Xbox, is a vehicular combat game released in 2002 for the Xbox and the PlayStation 2. It was developed by British developer Rage Software. The goal is to smash each other's cars until they are totaled.

== Reception ==
Reception

Aggregate score
Aggregator	Score
Metacritic	55/100

Review scores
Publication	Score
AllGame	3.5/5
Edge	7/10
Electronic Gaming Monthly	7/10
Game Informer	4/10
GamePro	3.5/5
GameSpot	3.5/10
GameSpy	1.5/5
GameZone	6.9/10
IGN	6.1/10
Official Xbox Magazine (US)	7.1/10

The Xbox version of Totaled! received "mixed" reviews according to the review aggregation website Metacritic.
