= Kosher (band) =

American punk rock band

- Origin: Warrensburg, Missouri, United States
- Genres: Punk rock
- Years active: 1995–present
- Labels: BYO Records
- Members: Remi Remlinger; Trent White; Josh Jordan; Rob Garrow
- Past members: Joseph Remlinger
- Website: http://www.ihatekosher.com

Kosher is an American punk rock band formed in 1995 in Warrensburg, Missouri, United States. They have released two studio albums. The current band members are Remi Remlinger on bass guitar and vocals, Trent White and Josh Jordan on guitars and vocals, and Rob Garrow on drums. Their second album Self Control was released on BYO Records. Self Control was reviewed by AllMusic and the punk zines Suburban Voice and Ox-Fanzine. By 2010 the group had disbanded; they played two reunion shows in the prior few years.

== Discography ==
=== Studio albums ===
- Self Control (2001)
- The CD (1997)

=== EPs ===
- Death to Drama (2000)
- Bored in America (1999)
