= Wednesday Night Heroes =

Canadian punk rock band

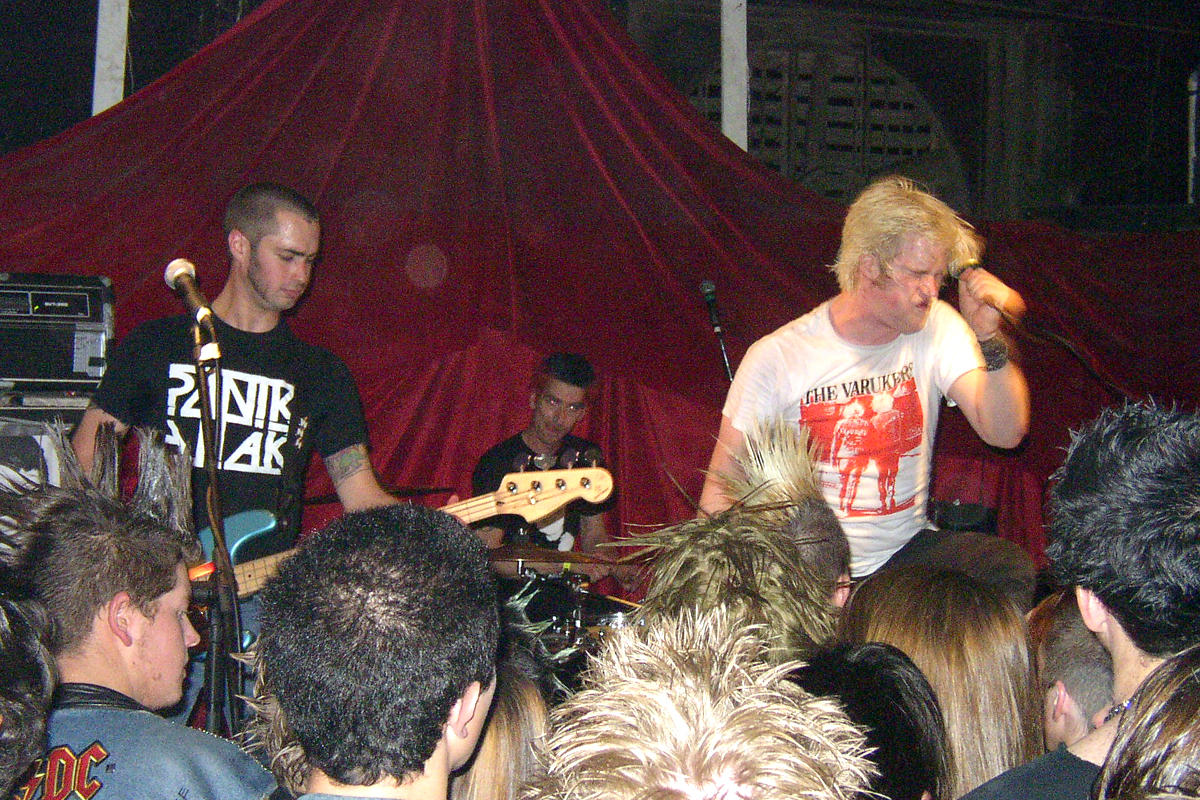

Background information
- Origin: Edmonton, Alberta, Canada
- Genres: Punk rock; oi!; street punk; hardcore punk
- Years active: 1997–2009, 2014
- Labels: BYO; Longshot
- Members: Graeme MacKinnon; Luke Manimal; Konrad Adrelunas; Jay Zazula
- Past members: Todd Rocket; Lance "The Impaler"
- Website: myspace.com/wnheroes

Wednesday Night Heroes (abbreviated as WNH) were a Canadian punk rock band from Edmonton, Alberta, fronted by Graeme MacKinnon. The band released three albums and toured extensively in Canada and the United States.

== History ==
The band was formed in 1997 in Edmonton. They released their first demo in September 1997, which included six songs. In July 2001, they released their first full-length album, which was self-titled.

WNH songs can be found on punk compilations such as Rockin' the Streets Vol. 2, Mayday Records comp, and Punx Unite Vol. 3, and Oi! Let's Go Canada.

WNH released their second full-length album on August 19, 2003, Superiority Complex, which includes the song "Music for the People".

They released their third full-length CD (LP) on BYO Records in June 2007, entitled Guilty Pleasures. The music combined elements of hardcore and street punk.

The Heroes stopped performing in 2009, but got together for final shows on January 25 and 27, 2014, in Edmonton.

MacKinnon later joined with Clint Frazier of Shout Out Out Out Out in the band Home Front.

== Discography ==
Albums

- Wednesday Night Heroes (2001)
- Superiority Complex (2003)
- Guilty Pleasures (2007)

=== Compilations ===
- Rockin' the Street Vol. 2
- Mayday! Records comp
- Punx Unite Vol. 3
- Oi! Let's Go Canada
