= Leatherface (band) =

British punk rock band

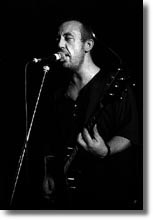

Background information
- Origin: Sunderland, Tyne and Wear, England
- Genres: Punk rock; melodic hardcore; emo
- Years active: 1988–1994, 1998–2012
- Labels: Little Rocket Records, Big Ugly Fish, No Idea, BYO, Meantime, Teichiku, Seed, King, Fire, Domino, Your Choice
- Past members: Frankie Stubbs; Dickie Hammond; Andrew "Lainey" Laing; Graeme Philliskirk; David Lee Burdon; Leighton Evans; Andy Crighton; Steven 'Eagle' Charlton; Andy Duncan; Stuart Scouler; Dickie Camm
- Website: leatherfacemusic.bandcamp.com

Leatherface was a British punk rock band from Sunderland, Tyne and Wear, fronted by Frankie Stubbs. Trouser Press called them "England's finest, most exciting punk band of the 90s" and The Guardian has called them "the greatest British punk band of the modern era."

== History ==
Leatherface was formed in August 1988 by Frankie Stubbs (vocals/guitar) and Stuart Scouler (bass), alongside HDQ members Andrew Lainey Laing (drums) and Richard "Dickie" Hammon (guitar). Their first show was opening for GBH at the Riverside. GBH did not arrive, and Leatherface performed for twenty minutes. They quickly grew a local fan base, soon recording a demo at Desert Sounds studio in Gateshead then embarking on a tour of mainland Europe in May 1989 with Union Morbide. For this tour, they performed as a trio, due to Hammond's scheduling conflicts with HDQ. In July 1989, they recorded their debut album Cherry Knowle at Beaumont Street Studios in Huddersfield, which would be released by Meantime Records. Immediately following the recording, Scouler departed from the group, leading to the hiring of Rob Bewick then Dick 'Head' Camm.

In 1990, they released the EP Beerpig, then toured the United Kingdom with Fual, and Europe. Much of the European tour was undertaken as a trio, other than a date in Eindhoven, where Hammon performed with both Leatherface and HDQ. After the tour, the band hired Rob Turnbull on bass, and signed to Roughneck Recording, releasing their second album Fill Your Boots the same year, as well as the single Razorblades And Aspirin and the Smokey Joe EP.

Their third album Mush was released in 1991. According to Allmusic, it was "one of the most intense records of the 90s, with some of the fiercest playing and song dynamics.. considered one of the best albums of the decade." At the beginning of 1992, they toured mainland Europe with support from Wat Tyler. This followed by a single covering ABBA's song "Eagle", then the Compact And Bijou EP. At the end of the year, they recorded their fourth album Minx which was released 1993, the same year as the EP The Right Thing. In 1994, they released their fifth album The Last, followed by a UK headline tour. The final date of the tour was in Leeds, where Stubbs, unbeknownst to the other members, announced that it would immediately disband.

The band split in late 1993, – releasing a posthumous mini album (The Last) the following year – but reformed in 1998, after the death of bass player Andy Crighton (also of Snuff). Four more albums followed between 1999 and 2012.

Rubber Factory Records released a tribute album to Leatherface in 2008, featuring 41 tracks by over 35 artists from several different countries who were influenced by the band, including Hot Water Music and The Sainte Catherines.

There is confusion as to whether their cover of "Can't Help Falling In Love With You" was played in the final episode of Sons of Anarchy as there is evidence it was performed by Franky Perez & The Forest Rangers.

=== Post-split ===
After Leatherface disbanded, Stubbs moved on to two new bands, Jesse and Pope. Jesse released three singles and one self-titled album between 1995 and 1998. Stubbs also performed solo and released one single in 1995 and a 10’’ EP in 2001, while Hammond formed Dr Bison.

Stubbs was featured on Duncan Redmonds' 2009 collaboration album Bubble and Squeak on four tracks alongside Redmonds, Loz Wong (Snuff) and Wes Wasley (Consumed, Billy No Mates) calling themselves "The Pissmops". He was referenced in Franz Nicolay's song "Frankie Stubbs Tears".

'Heart is Home' was among the first four VinylVideos ever produced.

== Musical style and legacy ==
Leatherface's music has been described as a cross between Hüsker Dü and Motörhead, a notable element being Stubbs' rasping, "gravelly" vocals. Critics have categorised them as emo, melodic hardcore and punk rock.

They have cited influences including Dag Nasty, the Exploited, Descendents, the Police, Sex Pistols, AC/DC, Steel Pulse, the Ruts, Motörhead and the Blood.

They have been cited as influence by Samiam, American Nightmare, Lifetime, Broccoli, the Sainte Catherines, the Hold Steady, the Cribs, American Steel, Hot Water Music, Lemuria, Mil-Spec, Avail, Dillinger Four and the Gaslight Anthem. Alternative Press cited them as an influenced upon the development of the pop-punk genre, while New Noise Magazine noted them as establishing the sound of Gainesville punk, stating "the Gainesville sound really came from Sunderland."

== Discography ==
=== Albums ===
- Cherry Knowle (1989), Meantime Records
- Fill Your Boots (1990), Roughneck Records
- Mush (1991), Roughneck Records
- Minx (1993), Roughneck Records
- The Last (1994), Domino Recording Company (mini-LP)
- BYO Split Series, Vol. 1 (1999), BYO Records, (Split LP with Hot Water Music)
- Horsebox (2000), BYO Records
- Dog Disco (2004), BYO Records
- The Stormy Petrel (2010), Big Ugly Fish Recordings/No Idea Records/Poison City Records/Punk in Ya Face Records

=== Compilation and live albums ===
- Live in Oslo (1995), Rugger Bugger Discs
- Discography Part One (1998), Rejected Records
- Discography Part Two (1998), Rejected Records
- Your Choice Live Series (1995) Your Choice Records, (split LP with Jawbox)
- Boat in the Smoke (2004), Live DVD – Punkervision
- Live in Melbourne – Viva La Arthouse (2011), Big Ugly Fish Recordings/No Idea Records/Poison City Records/Punk in Ya Face
- Razor Blades And Aspirin: 1990-1993 (2015), Fire Records (Record Store Day 2015 release)

=== Singles and EPs ===
- "Beerpig" – Meantime Records (1990)
- "Razor Blades And Aspirin" – Roughneck Records (1990)
- "Smokey Joe" – Roughneck Records (1990)
- "Not Superstitious" – Roughneck Records (1991)
- "I Want The Moon" – Roughneck Records (1991)
- "Compact & Bijou" – Roughneck Records (1992)
- "Hops & Barley" – Clawfist Records (1992) (split 7-inch with Wat Tyler)
- "Eagle" – Blackbox Records (1992)
- "Do the Right Thing" – Roughneck Records (1993)
- "Mackem Bastards" – Rugger Bugger Discs (1994)
- "Little White God" – Domino Records (1994)
- "Bonus Live" – Deranged Records (2003)

Additionally, there was a limited edition single that came packaged with some copies of the vinyl edition of the Minx album, containing the songs "Dreaming" and "Can't Help Falling in Love".

=== Promotional videos ===
- Discipline (1989)
- Peasant in Paradise (1990)
- Razorblades and Aspirin (1990)
- Talkin' 'bout a Revolution (1992)
- Do the Right Thing (1993)

=== Compilation appearances ===
- Seconds Out, Round One, Imaginary Records, 1992. Tracks:"Not Superstitious", "One To Say", "Discipline".
- Going Underground, Eurostar Records, 1992. Track: "I Want the Moon".
- The Pretty and the Vacant, Released Emotions. Track: "Melody Lee" (by The Damned)
- Punk-Past, Present and Future, Released Emotions. Track: "Melody Lee" by The Damned
- Another Kind Of Noise, Continental Records, 1992. Track: "I Want the Moon".
- Kill The Flippers With Guitar, Vinyl Japan, 1992. Tracks: "Springtime" and "Colorado Joe / Leningrad Vlad".
- Rough Trade Volume 5, Rough Trade Records, 1993. Track: "Do the Right Thing".
- Independent Top 20, Beechwood Music, 1993. Track: "I Want the Moon".
- Fire Is Good, Fire Records. Tracks: "Eagle" (by ABBA) and "Dreaming".
- Weird and Wonderful, Rough Trade Records, 1993. Track: "Springtime".
- Metal CD Volume 8, Mayking Records. Track: "Fat, Earthy, Flirt".
- For A Fistful Of Yens!, Bitzcore Records, 1994. Track: "Animal Day".
- Mackem Music – The Sound Of Sunderland. Track: "I Can't Help Falling in Love with You" (by Elvis).
- Rejected Volume II, Rejected Records. Track: "Peasant In Paradise" (Live version recorded in Dublin in 1993)
- Der F.C. St. Pauli ist schuld dass ich so bin, Bitzcore Records, 1998. Track: "Hops And St. Pauli!"
- We Are The People : A Tribute to the Angelic Upstarts, Knock Out Records, 1998. Track: "Teenage Warning" (by Angelic Upstarts).
- We Deliver The Goods, Cargo Records, 1999. Track: "Andy".
- Greetings From The Welfare State, BYO Records, 1999. Track: "Boogie On Down".
- Ritalin Riot 2, ADD Records. Track: "Grip".
- I Wouldn't Piss On It If It Was On Fire, Fire Records, 2000. Track: "I Want the Moon".
- BYO Records Sampler 2001, BYO Records, 2001. Track: Little White God".
- Planet Of Punks Volume 2, Straight Ahead Record, 2002. Track: Little White God".
- Sample This, Too!, BYO Records, 2002. Leatherface track: "Andy".
- Rejected Volume III, Rejected Records, 2003. Track: "All I Need".
- BYO Records 2004 Spring Sampler, BYO Records, 2004. Track: "Plastic Surgery".
- Punk In Sunderland Volume 2, Stretch Records, 2004. Tracks: "Eagle" (by ABBA) and "Moon River" (by Andy Williams).
- Poison The World, Poison City Records, 2005. Track: "Hoodlum".
