= BYO Records =

American independent record label

Better Youth Organization Records
- Founded: 1981
- Founder: Shawn Stern, Mark Stern
- Genre: Punk rock, hardcore punk
- Country of origin: U.S.
- Location: Los Angeles, California

Better Youth Organization Records (BYO) is a Los Angeles, California based independent punk rock record label created by Shawn and Mark Stern, two of the three brothers of the California punk rock band Youth Brigade (the third being Adam Stern who plays bass but does not run BYO). BYO sold major interest to Trust Records in 2019.

== Aim and history ==
BYO aims to promote punk and other alternative youth cultures in a positive light. BYO released records by 7 Seconds, Agression, and SNFU in the 1980s, as well as Leatherface, Kosher, The Unseen, Throw Rag, Jon Cougar Concentration Camp, Automatic 7 and The Briefs. It also started the BYO Split Series of full-length records shared by bands from other labels, such as Leatherface/Hot Water Music, Swingin' Utters/Youth Brigade, NOFX/Rancid, The Bouncing Souls/Anti-Flag and Alkaline Trio/One Man Army.

Before BYO became a record label they started as a fanzine, in 1981, named after their namesake. The zine intended to tackle the issues of police brutality and the negative views towards punks and the punk scene. As of late-2013, the label is defunct.

== See also ==
- BYO Records discography
- List of record labels
