= The Forgotten (band) =

American punk rock band

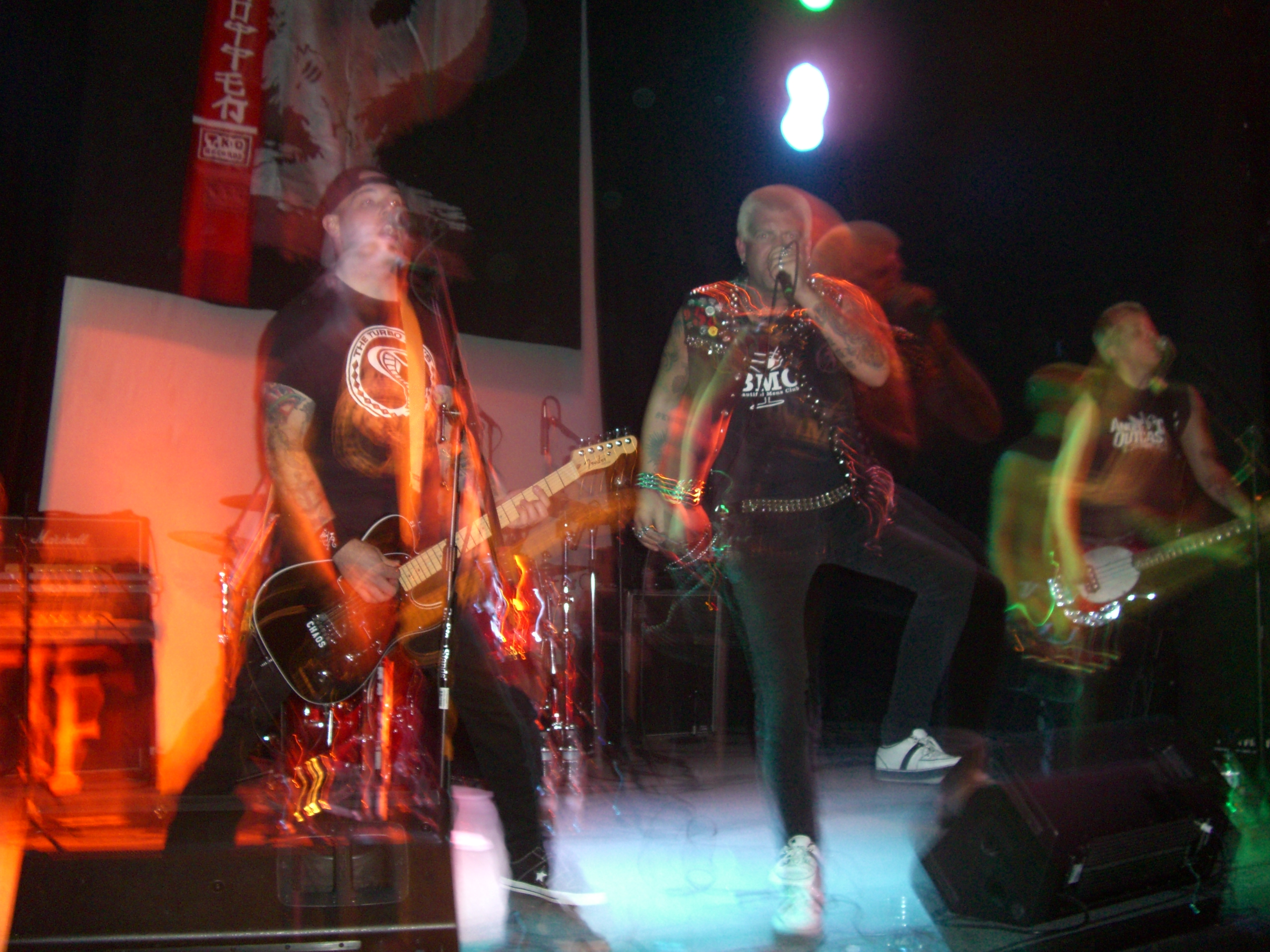
- The Forgotten live in 2008

Background information
- Also known as: TF
- Origin: San Jose, California
- Genres: Punk rock; street punk
- Years active: 1997–2017
- Labels: BYO; Knockout; People Like You; Core-Tex; Abusive; TKO
- Members: Gordy Carbone; Dave Kashka; Johnny Gregurich; Nick Schuneman
- Past members: Craig Fairbaugh; Jonny Manak; Gabe Gossack; Ken Helwig; Todd Loomis; Shea Roberts

The Forgotten is an American punk rock band based in San Jose, California. They have toured the U.S., Canada, Europe and Japan numerous times.

== History ==
Singer Gordy Carbone and bassist Ken Helwig's previous band SLIP had recently broken up, coincidentally, at the same time as guitarist Craig Fairbaugh and drummer Shea Roberts' band 46 Short. The four joined forces in 1997 to form The Forgotten. The band was signed as the second band ever to TKO Records. Dave Kashka joined in 1999 on drums, and Johnny "Bleachedjeans" Gregurich joined in April 2000 on bass, at which point the band went full-time. They have four full-lengths and four EPs on TKO Records. The Forgotten also has releases on BYO records (CA, USA), Knockout Records (DE), Coretex Records (DE) and People Like You Records (DE), and have appeared on numerous compilation and tribute albums. The band toured heavily throughout Europe, the US and Japan from 2000 to 2003, building a loyal and growing following. Original guitarist Craig Fairbaugh left the band in late 2003 and moved to the Los Angeles area to pursue a solo music career. A longtime guitar player, bassist Johnny decided to shift over to guitar after the band became frustrated with several unsuccessful guitarist auditions. Jonny Manak joined on bass in 2005 for one year. Nick "Ugly" Schuneman took over permanently on bass in November 2006, at which point the last line-up has remained intact since. The band has not performed live since August 2017 but are still looking to release new material and play live again someday. The last, most longstanding line-up consists of Carbone, Gregurich, Schuneman and Kashka.

Rancid's Lars Frederiksen has produced three works by The Forgotten: Class Separation EP, Veni Vidi Vici and the self-titled CD 'The Forgotten'. Carbone also plays and records with Lars Frederiksen in Lars Frederiksen & the Bastards.

The Forgotten has played shows and/or toured with Rancid, Dropkick Murphys, AFI, The Unseen, The Casualties, U.S. Bombs, GBH, Oxymoron, Agnostic Front, The Business, Madball, Cock Sparrer, Anti-Nowhere League, The Adicts, Nashville Pussy, Demented Are Go, Slayer, Anti-Heros, Bouncing Souls, Hot Water Music, Ignite, Misftis, Fear, Distillers, Sham 69, Cro-Mags, Earth Crisis, U.K. Subs, One Man Army and Stiff Little Fingers.

Joe Strummer of The Clash once mentioned that The Forgotten was the best name for a punk band he'd ever heard.

== Members ==
=== Current ===
- Gordy Carbone – vocals (1997–present)
- Johnny "Bleachedjeans" Gregurich – guitar, backing vocals (2000–present), bass (2000–2003)
- Nick "Ugly" Schuneman – bass, backing vocals (2006–present)
- Dave Kashka – drums (1999–present)

==== Former ====
- Craig Fairbaugh – guitar, backing vocals (1997–2003)
- Ken Helwig – bass, backing vocals (1997–1999)
- Gabe Gossack – bass, backing vocals (1999–2000)
- Jonny Manak – bass, backing vocals (2005–2006)
- Shea Roberts – drums (1997–1998)
- Todd Loomis – drums (1998–1999)

==== Former touring ====
- Eric Powers – drums (2011, 2014)
- Mike Fox – guitar (2004)

== Discography ==
=== Studio albums ===
- Veni Vidi Vici CD/LP (1998) TKO Records
- Keep the Corpses Quiet CD/LP (2000) TKO Records
- Control Me CD/LP (2002) BYO Records
- The Forgotten CD (2008) TKO Records

=== EPs ===
- Class Separation 7-inch EP (1997) TKO Records
- Picture Disc 7-inch EP (1999) Abusive Records
- Ask No Questions CD/10" EP (2001) Knockout Records
- The Forgotten/Heartaches split CD/LP (2003) People Like You Records

=== Compilation albums ===
- Singles Collection CD/LP (2000) Core-Tex Records (DE)
- Out of Print US-release of Singles Collection CD (2003) BYO Records

=== Covers ===
- "Riff Raff" AC/DC (2000 A Punk Tribute to AC/DC CD/LP)
- "No Room For You" Demob (2000 US Tour – present)
- "Employer's Blacklist" The Business (2001 Hardcore Hooligan: A Tribute to the Business CD/LP)
- "Your Generation" Generation X (2003 The Forgotten/Heartaches Split CD/LP)
- "I Am The Hunted" GBH (2003 The Forgotten/Heartaches Split CD/LP)
- "You May Be Right" Billy Joel (2005–2006 live)
- "On the Dark Side" (medley inside "Social Security") John Cafferty & The Beaver Brown Band (2005–2006 live)
- "Solitary Man" Neil Diamond (2005–2006 live)
- "Rock 'N' Roll Outlaw" Rose Tattoo (2006 live with Shawn Packer)
- "Knife's Edge" GBH (2008 Self-Titled CD)
- "Safe European Home" The Clash (2008 European Tour – present)
- "I Got Your Number" Cock Sparrer (2008 A Tribute To Cock Sparrer CD/LP)
- "Catastrophe" Swingin' Utters (2010 Untitled 21: A Juvenile Tribute to the Swingin' Utters CD/LP)
- "Corruption" Rancid (2014 Hooligans United: Rancid Tribute Record CD/LP)
- "I'm True" Anti-Heros (2016 live)

== Concert tours ==
- Peter and the Test Tube Babies/The Forgotten US Tour 9/4/98-10/10/98
- "TKO Records So-Cal Invasion" California Tour – Workin' Stiffs/The Randumbs/Reducers SF/The Forgotten/Pressure Point/The Bodies 11/3/99-11/5/99
- The Business/Agnostic Front/U.S. Bombs/The Forgotten European Tour 6/17/00-7/9/00
- Blanks 77/The Forgotten/Sixer/The Krays US Tour 7/21/00-8/4/00
- Agnostic Front/Ignite/The Forgotten/Shutdown/Discipline/Stampin' Ground European Tour 11/15/00-12/10/00
- The Forgotten/Sixer European Tour 5/10/01-7/8/01
- "Pure Punk Tour" US – Oxymoron/The Forgotten/The Boils/Dead Empty 7/22/01-8/26/01
- The Forgotten US Tour 5/4/02-6/28/02
- "Chaos Across The Nation" US Tour – Youth Brigade/Oxymoron/The Forgotten/The Beltones/Pistol Grip 8/19/02-9/8/02
- The Unseen/The Forgotten/46 Short California Tour 10/10/02-10/14/02
- The Casualties/The Forgotten US Tour 11/1/02-12/15/02
- GBH/The Forgotten/Toxic Narcotic West Coast Tour 1/23/03-2/4/03
- The Unseen/The Forgotten US Tour 5/17/03-6/7/03
- The Forgotten US Tour 7/26/03-8/3/03
- F-Minus/The Forgotten/A Global Threat US Tour 8/4/03-8/11/03
- "Punk-O-Rama" Canada Tour – Bouncing Souls/Hot Water Music/The Forgotten/Worthless United 8/13/03-8/24/03
- The Forgotten/Last Target Japan Tour 10/11/03-10/19/03
- U.S. Bombs/The Forgotten California Tour 3/18/05-3/22/05
- The Forgotten/Radio Dead Ones European Tour 2/24/08-3/8/08
- The Forgotten Hawaii Tour 10/7/11-10/8/11

=== Festivals ===
- Oberwart Festival – Oberwart, Austria 6/24/00
- With Full Force Festival – Roitschora, Germany 6/25/00
- Sommerloch Festival – Limburg, Germany 7/1/00
- Fasanenhof Antifascist Festival – Stuttgart, Germany 5/19/01
- Tonne Festival – Wangen, Germany 6/9/01
- Open Air Festival – Regensburg, Germany 6/22/01
- Holidays In The Sun Festival – Morecambe, England 7/6/01
- Sjock Festival – Antwerp, Belgium 7/8/01
- Beer Olympics Festival – Atlanta, GA 7/22/01
- Holidays In The Sun Festival – San Francisco, CA 8/26/01
- Holidays In The Sun Festival – Asbury Park, NJ 9/8/02
- Punk Rock Bowling Music Festival – Las Vegas, NV 2/3/03
- Punk & Disorderly Festival – Berlin, Germany 2/24/08
- Punk Rock Bowling Music Festival – Las Vegas, NV 5/26/12
- Punk Rock Bowling Music Festival – Las Vegas, NV 5/25/14
- Insta-Fest – Long Beach, CA 9/13/14

== Associated acts ==
- Lars Frederiksen and the Bastards – Gordy Carbone (vocals), Craig Fairbaugh (guitar)
- Transplants – Craig Fairbaugh (guitar)
- +44 – Craig Fairbaugh (guitar)
- Juliette and the Licks – Craig Fairbaugh (guitar)
- Mercy Killers – Craig Fairbaugh (vocals, guitar)
- The Casualties – Johnny Gregurich (bass guitar, fill-in)
- The Dwarves – Nick Schuneman (guitar, fill-in)
- Swingin' Utters – Nick Schuneman (bass guitar, guitar, fill-in)
- Re-volts – Nick Schuneman (guitar)
- Slip – Gordy Carbone (vocals)
- Nowhere Men – Gordy Carbone (vocals)
- (Four) Banger – Dave Kashka (drums), Johnny Gregurich (bass guitar, guitar)
- Karate Riot – Johnny Gregurich (bass guitar, vocals)
- CAMP FUN – Nick Schuneman (guitar, vocals)
- Teens in Trouble – Nick Schuneman (guitar)
- Bibles & Hand Grenades – Dave Kashka (drums)
- Strange Kicks – Nick Schuneman (guitar, vocals)
- Muckruckers – Nick Schuneman (guitar, vocals)
- The Vex – Johnny Gregurich (bass guitar, fill-in)
- The Uglies – Nick Schuneman (guitar, vocals)
- Trashkannon – Nick Schuneman (guitar)
- Crack – Dave Kashka (drums)
- Vintage 46 – Craig Fairbaugh (guitar)
- No One's Victim – Johnny Gregurich (bass guitar, guitar, fill-in)
- The Frontline – Johnny Gregurich (bass guitar)
