= Chuck Briggs =

American musician

Chuck Briggs (15 March 1960 – 4 July 2000) was an American punk rock guitarist, notably working with the U.S. Bombs. He was featured on the albums Garibaldi Guard, War Birth and Never Mind the Opened Minds.

During the 1980s, he played with a number of Californian punk bands, most notably the Dischords, who released one EP, Dirty Habits. Briggs was a good friend of U.S. Bombs' lead singer, Duane Peters, for many years. After the release of War Birth, and the tour that followed, Briggs left the U.S. Bombs when he found out he was HIV positive from IV drug use, and was replaced by Johnny 'Two Baggs' Wickersham for the follow-up album, The World. His condition was kept private until shortly before his death. During his final hospital stay, Briggs was visited by family, friends, and former bandmates from U.S. Bombs.

Some notable tracks, other than the Dischords EP and three U.S. Bombs releases, which feature Briggs are "Checkpoint Chuck", a demo version of "Checkpoint" (taken from The World), featuring his guitar and backing vocals (available on Old Skars and Upstarts) and "From the Otherside", a solo song, sung by Briggs, from 'Old Skars and Upstarts 2001'. The U.S. Bombs album Back at the Laundromat was dedicated to Briggs. The album included a song dedicated to him called "Goodnight". Their latest album, We are the Problem includes another tribute track, "Last Dischord".
