= Keep the Corpses Quiet =

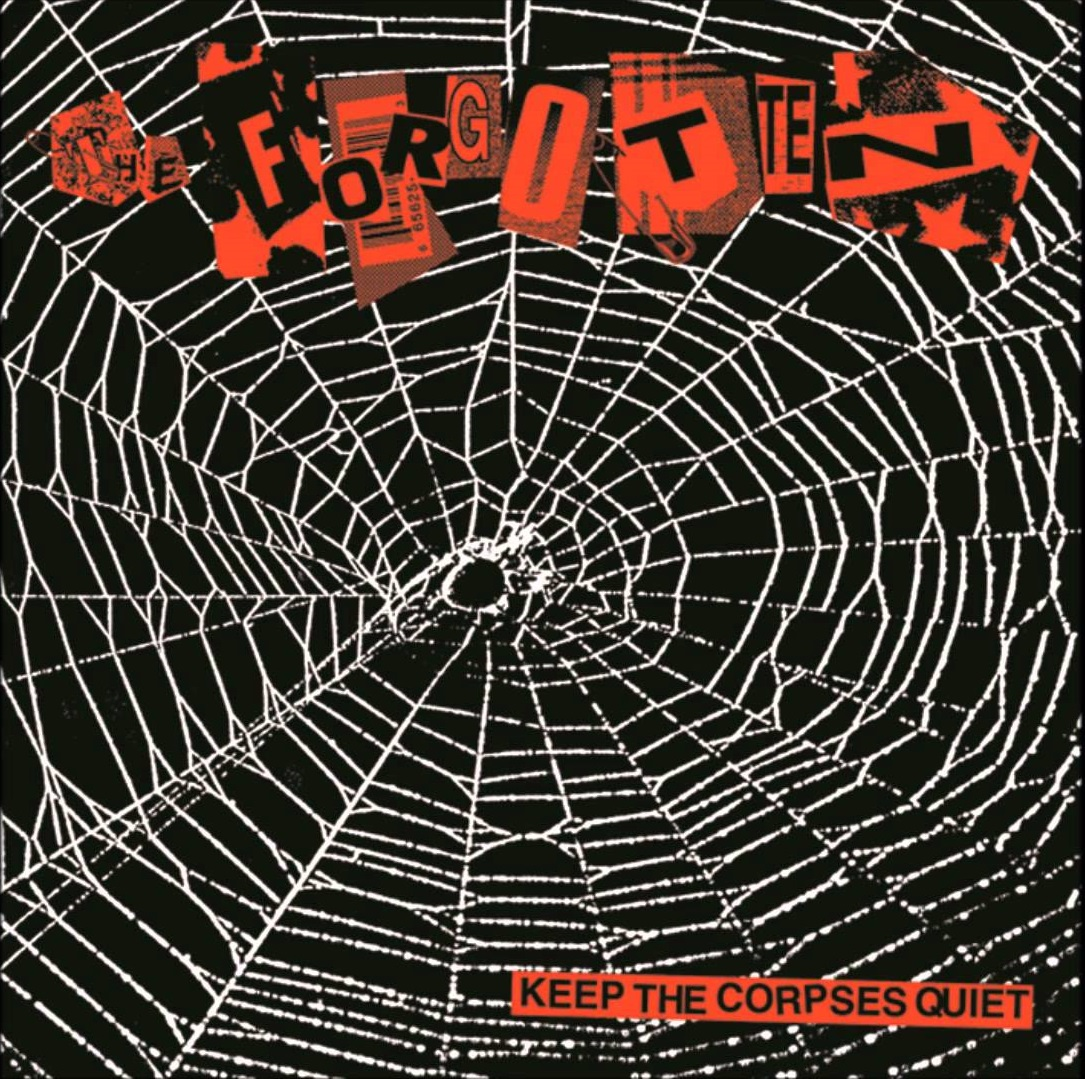

Studio album by The Forgotten
- Released: September 19, 2000
- Recorded: May 2000
- Studio: Soundtek Studios, Campbell, California
- Genre: Punk rock
- Length: 27:26
- Label: TKO Records
- Producer: The Forgotten

The Forgotten chronology
Veni Vidi Vici (1998)	Keep the Corpses Quiet (2000)	Ask No Questions (2001)

Professional ratings
Review scores
Source	Rating
Allmusic	3/5 stars
PunkNews	4/5 stars

Keep the Corpses Quiet is the second album from punk rock band The Forgotten. It is their third release under TKO Records, overall release No. 49 by the label itself. It was released in September 2000 on limited edition red vinyl, black vinyl and CD. It contains one of the band's most popular songs, "Silent Weapons", which Greg Brodick produced a music video for.

== Track listing ==
All music is composed by The Forgotten.

No.	Title	Length
1.	"Who Blames You"	1:41
2.	"Forced To Believe"	1:16
3.	"Silent Weapons"	2:11
4.	"Air Raid"	1:28
5.	"Revolutionary"	2:14
6.	"Genocide"	1:23
7.	"No System"	1:10
8.	"Outsider"	1:53
9.	"Condemned"	1:58
10.	"Get Out"	3:07
11.	"Nothing To Lose"	2:02
12.	"Keep The Corpses Quiet"	2:14
13.	"No More Youth"	2:00
14.	"The Corps"	1:03
15.	"Ain't Gonna Lose The War"	1:46
Total length:		27:26

== Personnel ==
- Gordy Carbone – lead vocals
- Craig Fairbaugh – guitar, bass guitar, vocals
- Johnny (Bleachedjeans) Gregurich – bass guitar
- Dave Kashka – drums

Production

- The Forgotten – producer
- Robert Berry – engineer
