= Richard Owens (poet) =

American publisher, critic and poet

Richard Owens (August 6, 1973) is an American poet. Known also for his work as a publisher and critic, he is founding editor of the literary journal Damn the Caesars and co-founder of the left-wing punk band Those Unknown. His poetic work appears in several volumes, including Delaware Memoranda (2008), No Class (2012), Ballads (2012; 2015), and the collected volume Poems (2019). A number of his literary essays, most of which earlier appeared in scholarly and small press publications, are included in the collection Sauvage: Essays on Anglophone Poetry (2019).

== Music and poetry ==
From 1989 through 1997 Owens played drums with Those Unknown, among the earliest left-wing Oi! bands in the US. Founded by Richard and brother Bill Owens in Sussex County, New Jersey, Those Unknown released a number of elapsed play and full-length records on a number of independent labels and performed regularly with bands that included Ox Blood, the Wretched Ones, the Templars, Niblick Henbane, the Trouble, and the Pinkerton Thugs. Additionally, Owens contributed letters, columns, and feature-length articles to Maximum RocknRoll from 1994 through 1999.

Earning his PhD in English from the State University of New York at Buffalo, where he studied under poet-critics Susan Howe and Steve McCaffery, Owens published his first book-length collection of poems, Delaware Memoranda, in 2008. Subsequent collections include Ballads (2012) and No Class (2012), both of which extend from Owens's earlier work in music, balladry, and folk culture. In the Winter 2016 issue of Chicago Review Owens published "Circuits of Reciprocity: Folk Culture, Class Politics, and Contemporary Ballad Writing," an essay which clearly outlines his position on balladry and folk culture as class-specific, deeply political and socially influential practices.

== Editing and printmaking ==
As an editor, Owens has followed poet Barrett Watten's claim, "Editing is act." Focusing on Marxist and other radical poetries, from 2005 onward Owens has edited the poetry and poetics journal Damn the Caesars under the Punch Press imprint through which he also prints and publishes individual volumes by poets from across the US, UK, and elsewhere. Working in a variety of mediums that include letterpress, silkscreen, and digital printing methods, Owens has designed, hand-printed, and discreetly distributed in small runs work by poets that include Sean Bonney, Frances Crot, David Grundy, Kent Johnson, Frances Kruk, Luke Roberts, Samantha Walton, and many others.

As a printmaker, Owens was formally trained from 1987 to 1991 in commercial art and graphic design at Sussex County Vocational and Technical School, Sparta, New Jersey. From 2006 until 2010 Owens printed alongside poets Michael Cross, David Hadbawnik, Andrew Rippeon, and Kyle Schlesinger on a Vandercook 4 proof press housed at the Center for the Arts, SUNY-Buffalo. Beginning in 2010, Owens has printed on an unmotorized Vandercook 1 proof press using a variety of brayer-based hand-inking methods. His print work is maintained in a number of special collections, including the Woodberry Poetry Room at Harvard University, the Beinecke Rare Book and Manuscript Library at Yale University, and the Poetry Collection at the University at Buffalo.

== Selected bibliography ==
=== Poetry ===
- Delaware Memoranda. Buffalo, NY: BlazeVox, 2008.
- Embankments | Outtakes | Uppercuts. Buffalo, NY: BlazeVox, 2010.
- Ballads. Buffalo, NY: Habenicht Press, 2012.
- No Class. London and Brighton, UK: Barque Press, 2012.
- Clutch. No location: Vigilance Society, 2012.
- Ballads, 2nd Edition. Buffalo, Toronto, Boston, Cincinnati: Eth Press, 2015.
- Dead in the House of Pound. Amsterdam, HL: Crater Press, 2018.
- Poems. Buffalo, NY: BlazeVox, 2019.
- Song of the Constant Sea. Exeter, UK: Shearsman Books, 2021.

=== Criticism ===
- "Circuits of Reciprocity: Folk Culture, Class Politics, and Contemporary Ballad Writing." Chicago Review 60:02 (2016): 78–90.
- Sauvage: Essays on Anglophone Poetry. Buffalo, NY: BlazeVox, 2019.

== Selected discography (Those Unknown) ==
=== Exrended play ===
- Those Unknown. 7-inch EP. 33 rpm. Midland Park, NJ: Headache Records, 1991.
- Going Strong. 7-inch EP. 33 rpm. Midland Park, NJ: Headache Records, 1992.
- Distribution. 7-inch EP. 45 rpm. Sussex, NJ: Pogostick Records,1995.

=== Long play ===
- Those Unknown. CD. Atlanta, GA: GMM Records 1995.
- Those Unknown. LP. 33 rpm. Dinslaken, Germany: Knock Out Records, 1995.
- Scraps. CD. San Francisco, CA: TKO Records, 2003.
- Those Unknown. CD. San Francisco, CA: TKO Records, 2003.

=== Compilations ===
- The Only Spirit is Unity. 12-inch LP. Coburg, Germany: Dim Records, 1993.
- American Headaches, 2-inch. CD. Coburg, Germany: Dim Records, 1994.
- Backstreets of American Oi!: Unreleased Anthems. CD. New York, NY: Sta Press Records, 1994.
- Limited Options Sold as Noble Endeavors: Benefit Compilation. 10-inch EP. Minneapolis, MN: Half-Mast Recording Corporation, 1997.
- Punch Drunk III. CD. San Francisco, CA: TKO Records, 2001.
- Punch Drunk IV. CD. San Francisco, CA: TKO Records, 2002.
