= TKO Records =

American record label

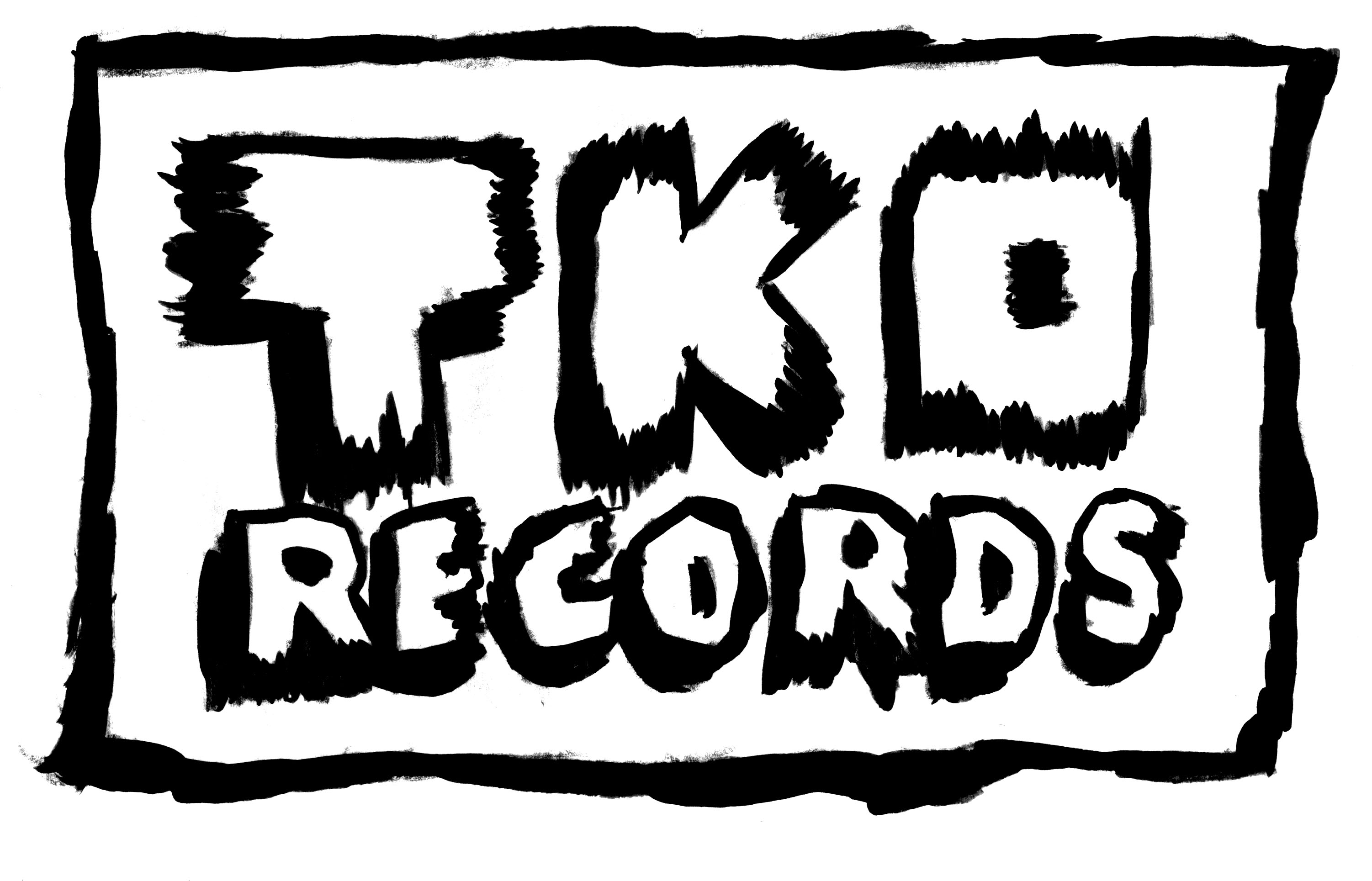
- Founded: 1997
- Founder: Mark Rainey
- Genre: Hardcore punk, street punk
- Country of origin: U.S.
- Location: Portland, Oregon
- Official website: tkorecords.com

TKO Records is an independent punk rock record label in Portland, Oregon. The label is primarily known for its role in the late 1990s American street punk scene and has continued its notability as a source of new releases, reissues, and archival recordings. The OC Weekly newspaper recognized the label as "best record label" in Orange County in 2011 and its record store of the same name as "best punk-rock record store" in Orange County, 2008.

== History ==
TKO Records was founded by Mark Rainey in 1997 in San Francisco, California. Early on the label rose to prominence with releases from the Dropkick Murphys, Lower Class Brats, Anti-Heros, Swingin' Utters, The Templars, Pressure Point, Workin' Stiffs, U.S. Bombs, and The Forgotten. The label helped to establish a sound and aesthetic for the street punk scene in the United States that was then rising in popularity. As TKO's prominence within the punk rock scene increased, the label also began releasing records from veteran punk bands such as Cocksparrer, Angelic Upstarts, the Partisans, Slaughter and the Dogs, The Bruisers, Chelsea, The Business, The Real Kids, and Antiseen.

Eventually the label relocated to Orange County, California and from 2000 to 2005 continued building a name with notable releases from "Beach Punk" bands such as the Smut Peddlers, the Stitches, Smogtown, the Crowd and Broken Bottles while continuing to release street punk and Oi! records.

In 2007 TKO Records opened a record store in Fountain Valley, California as part of the label's ten year anniversary. The label continues to release reissues and archival recordings from seminal punk bands, such as Poison Idea, the Templars, T.S.O.L., The Meatmen, Antiseen, No For An Answer, Channel 3, and Iron Cross, as well as new recordings from Giuda, The label's store front relocated to Huntington Beach, California in 2013 and has hosted readings from punk rock related writers, such as Tesco Vee, Jack Grisham, Alice Bag, Chris D. and Legs McNeil, as well live performances from artists including Deniz Tek, Chuck Dukowski, Scott Weinrich, Joe Keithley and Channel 3. The store specializes in rare, out of print records, as well as new releases from punk, hardcore, garage, reggae, ska, rock, and metal bands.

In the Fall of 2014, the label relocated to Portland, Oregon.

After being sold to new owners in 2016, the TKO Records record store in Huntington Beach, CA closed in January 2020.

Mark Rainey has also co-run the imprint record label Flat Records, along with Ken Casey of the Dropkick Murphys. Flat's releases have included records from Agnostic Front and Blood For Blood.

== Recent Roster ==
- ANTiSEEN (2000-Present)
- Death Ridge Boys (2023)
- Long Knife (2023)
- Lower Class Brats (1997-Present)
- No Time (2023)
- Poison Idea (2007-Present)
- Rose Of Victory (2022)
- Savage Beat (2022)
- Soft Kill (2020)
- the Templars (1997-Present)
- Tyrant (2023)

== Former ==
- 46 Short
- Adolf and the Piss Artists
- GG Allin & ANTiSEEN
- Angelic Upstarts
- Anti-Heros
- Bad Luck Charms (side project with members of U.S. Bombs)
- the Beltones
- Blood Stained Kings (featuring Yoji Harada)
- The Bodies
- The Boils
- Bottles & Skulls (featuring members of Triclops!)
- Broken Bottles
- The Bruisers
- The Business
- Channel 3
- Chelsea
- Class Assassins
- Cocknoose
- Cocksparrer
- Complete Control
- The Crowd
- The Crumbs
- Deadbolt
- Dead End Cruisers
- Demented Are Go
- The Distraction (featuring members of Le Shok)
- Dropkick Murphys
- Electric Frankenstein
- The Escape
- Filthy Thievin' Bastards
- The Flesh Eaters
- The Forgotten
- Glass Heroes
- The Generators
- Giuda
- Hammerlock
- Hank III
- Hard Skin
- Hatepinks
- Hollywood Hate (featuring Scotty Wilkins)
- Iron Cross
- Kill Your Idols
- The Krays
- Krum Bums
- Last Target (featuring members of Thug Murder)
- Limecell
- the Loose Lips
- Meatmen
- Nazi Dogs
- New York Rel-X (featuring members of The Krays
- Niblick Henbane
- No for an Answer
- The Obsessed
- Old Firm Casuals (featuring Lars Frederiksen)
- One Man Army
- The Partisans
- Peter and the Test Tube Babies
- Pressure Point
- The Radicts
- the Randumbs
- Real Kids
- Reducers SF
- The Rhythm Doctors
- The Riffs
- Slaughter and the Dogs
- Shock Nagasaki
- Smogtown
- Smut Peddlers
- The Stitches
- Straitjacket
- Strychnine
- Swingin' Utters
- Terminus City
- Those Unknown
- Tommy and the Terrors
- The Truents
- T.S.O.L.
- The Upsets
- U.S. Bombs
- Vicious Circle (pre-T.S.O.L.)
- Workin' Stiffs
- Wretched Ones
- YDi

== Flat Records roster ==
- 30 Seconds Over Tokyo
- All Systems Stop
- Agnostic Front
- BeerZone
- Big Bad Bollocks
- Blood For Blood
- the Bruisers
- The Cuffs
- Dropkick Murphys
- The Drunks
- Ducky Boys
- Hudson Falcons
- Main Street Saints
- Oxymoron
- Pressure Point
- The Randumbs
- Runnin' Riot (band)
- The Shods
- Terminus City
- Thug Murder
- The Trouble
- The Vigilantes
