= Cheap Sex =

American street punk band

- Origin: San Diego, California
- Genre: Street punk
- Years active: 2002–2007; 2009; 2013–present
- Label: Punk Core
- Members: Mike Virus; Johnny O.; Brock; Gabe
- Past members: Derek Dolls; Chance; Jordan "Ace" Von Johnson; Chris "Blitz" Wick; Beau Shmoe; Phil Robles

Cheap Sex is an American street punk band formed in December 2002, based in San Diego, California. Besides releasing three albums, the band participated in some compilations, including the Pure Punk Rock DVD, released by Punk Core Records, also featuring Action, the Casualties, Blood or Whiskey, Defiance, the Havoc, Lower Class Brats, the Messengers, the Scarred and the Virus, the last one being Mike Virus' previous band.

== History ==
After Mike left the Virus, he decided to form a new band, taking the name Cheap Sex because it was catchy and funny. The original line-up consisted of bassist Derek, guitarists John and Jordan, drummer Gabe and Mike singing, soon after they formed, a five-song demo was recorded. The band signed with Punk Core Records and recorded their debut album titled Launch Off to War, released in July 2003, Jordan only recorded half album before leaving to join Madcap, being replaced by Chris Blitz.

After playing several shows on the West Coast, the band made its East Coast debut at the 3 day Vive Le Punk Festival at CBGB OMFUG in New York. The festival took place on October 3, 4 and 5th, 2003, in both the Main Stage and the Lounge Stage at CBGB, on the Main Stage bands like Abrasive Wheels, MDC, the Krays, the Casualties, Two Man Advantage, Awkward Thought, Molotov Cocktail, the Boils among others performed, while the Lounge Stage, restricted to people with legal drinking age (21 and over), hosted bands like U.S. Chaos, Street Brats, Wretched Ones, Hugh Cornwell Band, Broken Heroes, Capo Regime, Weekend Warriors and Spitfires United among others. Cheap Sex performed Saturday October 4, sharing the Main Stage with the Adicts, Antidote, New York Rel-X, the Turbo A.C.'s, Midnight Creeps and Silenced Sin.

In 2003, in a tour with Lower Class Brats, driving a van to New York the band suffered an accident, when a trailer sideswiped the van, a truck loaded with cinder blocks was on the road, the truck took the doors off the van and some bricks flew in, one of the bricks severely injured Johnny O., tearing his aorta, this caused the cancellation of the rest of the tour. Despite the life-threatening accident, Johnn survived, but left the band to recover from the injury, due to the John's departure Phil joined the band.

In April 2004, the band recorded their second album for Punk Core Records, entitled Headed for a Breakdown, released October 5, 2004. They toured extensively during that summer, playing along the east coast with label mates Lower Class Brats.

The band performed in July at the Wasted 2004 festival in the U.K. (formerly known as Holidays in the Sun) with bands such as Discharge and Broken Bones. In the same year, Cheap Sex participated in the British Invasion 2k4 Festival, organized by SOS Records, the festival took place November 20, in San Bernardino, with the Adicts, the Exploited, Discharge, U.K. Subs, Cockney Rejects, the Restarts and local U.S. bands like Total Chaos, CH3 and Resilience among others, the show was recorded for a DVD release.

In 2005, the band returned to Morecambe for another edition of the Wasted Festival, between May 18 and 22, this time with bands like G.B.H., the Business, Funeral Dress, the Exploited, Anti Nowhere League, T.S.OL. and a lot more.

The last record by Cheap Sex, Written in Blood, was released on June 6, 2006, followed up with what would be their last U.S. tour with label mates the Scarred, called the "Bloody Solution U.S. Tour", which began on August 11, 2006, in Anaheim and ended on September 16, 2006, in Ventura.

On March 1, 2007, Cheap Sex's former guitarist, Chris Wick, committed suicide after struggling with heroin addiction and depression after the death of his mother in 2004, leading to the band's break-up. On March 15, 2007, Cheap Sex sent out a bulletin via MySpace stating that they would be breaking up and a final show was in the works, the final show was played June 24, 2007, with Career Soldiers and 46 Short in Fullerton, California.

In 2009, Cheap Sex released a DVD entitled Dead Today: V Years of Cheap Sex featuring a documentary about the band and live footage from the final two shows. The DVD was directed by their long-time merchandise creator and filmmaker Lewis Smithingham.

== After Cheap Sex ==
Mike was in a new band called Evacuate with members from Lab Rats and 2nd Hand Justice, following the hardcore / street punk sound that Cheap Sex and the Virus had, the band released a demo in 2007, plus a single and two albums. The band ended in 2017. Mike started a punk record label under the Evacuate name.

Phil and Brock, although rumored to initially be in Mike's band, Evacuate, have gone on to create a different band, A Bande Apart, a female fronted band. The band recorded a demo and then split up.

In addition to A Bande Apart, Brock was the bassist for Smash 77 with Shawn Smash from Total Chaos and Danny, ex-drummer of the same band. He plays bass in the rock band Plissken.

Phil briefly played with the Los Angeles band the Lieutenants, as well as the Long Beach based band Three Two Ones, with former members of the US Bombs and Duane Peters Gunfight, and the Hunns. He now sings and plays guitar for the band Drosscapes.

Johnny O. Negative has played with Lower Class Brats and Total Chaos to fill in for open spots on their tours, he has also lived in Raleigh, North Carolina, working with No Revolution. Johnny joined the Lower Class Brats as a full-time member but after several years left the band. Currently, Johnny lives in Las Vegas, Nevada.

Gabe (a.k.a. Gabe Cross, Gabe Sex, Gabe Skunt) has played drums for the San Diego garage rock band the Muslims for a short period of time, the Holy Boys (with former Cheap Sex guitarist Chris), and punk/Oi! band Northern Towns. Gabe sings for NYC-based band Lowlands.

Chance (Hurteau) (a.k.a. Chance Christ) had returned to being tattoo artist in 2005 under the name Chance Christ Superstar, and was tattooing in San Diego, California. He also did artwork using the name "EyesoreArt" for bands (most recently for the Lower Class Brats), zines, and music releases. He continued to write music and play bass, and from time to time he appeared in small music projects; but never returned to music full-time. Chance died in 2015 after a long battle with cancer.

Cheap Sex played a one-off reunion show on January 11, 2013, at The Observatory Theatre in Santa Ana, California, with Lower Class Brats, the Scarred, and Media Blitz. The show was to celebrate the 10 year anniversary of the first album, Launch Off to War, being released. All the band members currently live scattered around the US, so the band cannot be as active as it used to be. That one show led to the band re-grouping to play approximately once a year at various festivals.

== Members ==
- Mike Virus (Vocals)
- Johnny O. Negative (Guitar)
- Brock Anderson (Bass)
- Gabe Sex (Drums)

== Discography ==
- Launch Off to War (2003, Punk Core)
- Headed for a Breakdown (2004, Punk Core)
- Written in Blood (2006, Punk Core)
- Dead Today: V Years of Cheap Sex DVD (2009, Taang!)
