= Anti-Heros (band) =

American Oi!/street punk band

Anti-Heros are an American Oi!/street punk band formed in 1984 in Georgia, United States. They took a hiatus from 1989 to 1993, but continue to record and play concerts now. The original lineup consisted of Mark Noah (vocals), Mike Jones (bass), Tim Spier (drums) and Joe Winograd (guitar). Phil Solomon replaced Spier on the drums in 1988. The band released two records on Link Records in the late 1980s, That's Right! (produced by John Blackwell) in 1987 and Don't Tread on Me (produced by John Blackwell) in 1988. Link manager Mark Brennan never paid the band for the recordings, which the band members paid to produce.

In February 1997, longtime drummer Phil Solomon left and the band brought on Mark McClusky. Later, Don Shumate (AKA El Guapo, formerly of Time Bomb '77) took over percussion duties

Despite the band's vocal admonishment of racism, their association with such ideals has long been a topic of contention among fans. The band were involved in a lawsuit against New Line Cinema for using the band's logo in the film American History X against the band's will (as they did not want to be associated with white supremacists). Following the lawsuit, the logo was removed from all subsequent releases of the film.

Noah owns GMM Records. GMM Records released some of Dropkick Murphys' earliest recordings, as well as bands such as Iron Cross, Oxymoron, Agnostic Front, The Ducky Boys, The Templars and One Way System.

Beginning in 2023, the band began touring again after an extensive hiatus. They had their first live performance in twenty-one years on May 27, 2023.

== Discography ==
- That's Right! on LINK Records −1987
- Don't Tread On Me on LINK Records −1988
- Election Day 7-inch on GMM Records – 1992
- That's Right!/Don't Tread On Me multi-CD on GMM Records – 1994
- Murder One mini-CD on GMM Records – 1995
- American Pie CD and LP on Taang! Records – 1996
- Live on a Five 5" on Headache Records – 1997
- Truck Stop Toilet split 7-inch with Blanks 77 on Taang! Records – 1997
- Anti-Heros vs. Dropkick Murphys split on TKO Records – 1998
- Underneath the Underground on GMM Records – 1999
- 1000 Nights of Chaos LIVE on Taang! Records – 2000
- Devil At My Heels on GMM - 2024

=== Compilation appearances ===
- U.S. of Oi!, Volume 1 on LINK Records
- U.S. of Oi!, Volume 2 on GMM Records
- Oi! That's What I Call Music! on LINK Records
- Oi! Glorious Oi! on LINK Records
- Drunk and Disorderly on Step-1 Records
- Backstreets of American Oi! on Sta-Prest Records.
- Punk Uprisings Volume 2
- Skins and Pins on GMM Records
- Punch Drunk on TKO Recordsl
