= Ace Von Johnson =

American musician

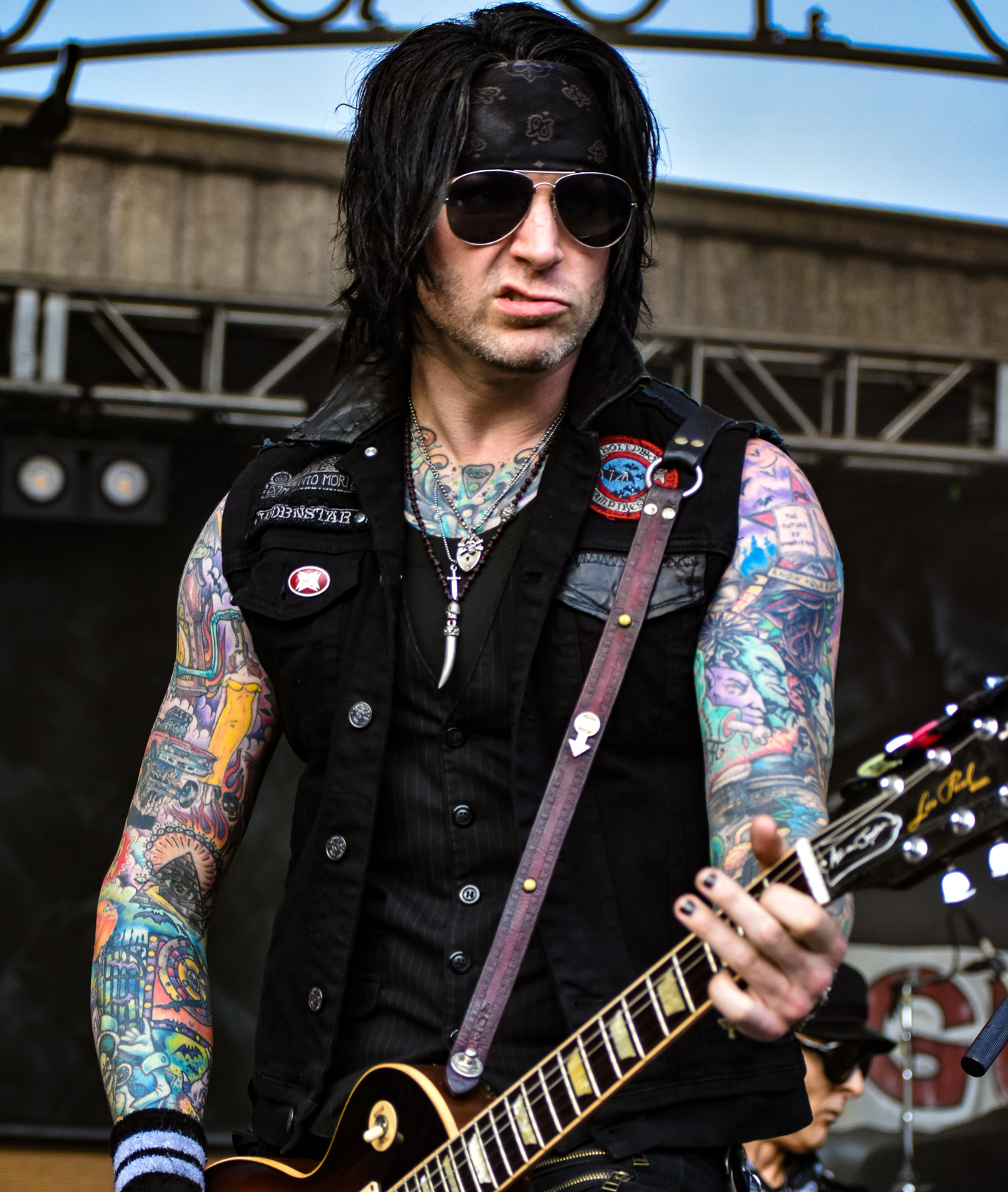
- Von Johnson in 2022

Background information
- Genres: Hard rock; heavy metal; glam metal; punk rock; alternative rock
- Occupation: Guitarist
- Years active: 1999–present
- Member of: L.A. Guns Faster Pussycat
- Formerly of: P.B.R.; Cheap Sex; Madcap; the U.S. Bombs; the Generators; Unwritten Law; Murphy's Law; Neon Coven

Ace Von Johnson is an American musician, voice actor, and animal advocate who is a lead guitarist in the glam metal band Faster Pussycat and currently is also the rhythm guitarist for L.A. Guns.

Von Johnson was previously a member of punk bands such as P.B.R., Cheap Sex, Madcap, the U.S. Bombs, the Generators, Unwritten Law, and Murphy's Law.

Von Johnson has also written music and been a guest musician, for numerous artists, across several different musical genres.

== Career ==
Von Johnson started playing guitar when he was 13, deciding to become a professional musician when was 16 or 17. He started his career playing in punk bands around San Diego and Hollywood. He formed his first band, P.B.R., at the age of 17. He was also a founding member of the street punk band Cheap Sex, although he left after they recorded their debut album and joined Madcap, at this point he was 19.

Von Johnson joined the Generators in 2005, playing with them until 2009. In 2007, he was a member of Murphy's Law and the U.S. Bombs. Von Johnson continued to play with U.S. Bombs' front man (professional skateboarder), Duane Peters, in both the Duane Peters Gunfight and The Great Unwashed. He joined Faster Pussycat in 2010. Also in 2010, he performed on an alternative version of the song "Hollywood Tonight" for the posthumous Michael Jackson album Michael. The track was produced by Jackson collaborator Ron "Neff-U" Feemster, but was ultimately not officially released.

Between 2012 and 2013 Von Johnson served as lead guitarist for Unwritten Law. From 2014 to 2017, he served as the musical director for the Rock and Shock horror and music convention, in Worcester, Massachusetts. The convention featured The Rocking Dead, a jam band that featured Von Johnson, as well as Misfits guitarist Doyle Wolfgang von Frankenstein. In 2017, Von Johnson was part of The Throbs reunion tour and in 2018 he played with Jyrki 69 (The 69 Eyes) for an eight date tour of the West Coast.

In 2017, Von Johnson co-founded the alternative rock band Neon Coven. In 2018, he joined L.A. Guns, while still touring with Faster Pussycat. He left Faster Pussycat in 2019 but, rejoined the band in 2026, and left Neon Coven in 2021.

In addition to music, Von Johnson is an animal advocate/ shelter volunteer and a voice actor. He has done voice over work for the Netflix series, Money Heist and for Shudder's, The Last Drive-In with Joe Bob Briggs. He has also done voice work for animated features and commercials.

== Discography ==
- P.B.R.- Running from Rebel Road (2002)
- Cheap Sex- Launch Off to War (2003)
- Stealing Candy Motion Picture Soundtrack [track "Forgotten Soldiers"- P.B.R.] (2003)
- Madcap- Under Suspicion (2004)
- The Generators- The Great Divide (2007)
- Shanti- Strange Days [co-wrote & performed on] (2008)
- Duane Peters Gunfight- Checkmate (2009)
- Duane Peters Gunfight- Forever Chess (2009)
- Charlie & The Valentine Killers- Self Titled (2011)
- Blackpool Republic- Cut the One You Love (2013)
- Blackpool Republic- Light It Up (2014)
- Faster Pussycat- I Love You All the Time (2016)
- Neon Coven- Risen (2017)
- Neon Coven- Never Let Me Down Again (2018)
- Neon Coven- The Haunting (2019)
- L.A. Guns- Another X-Mas In Hell (2019)
- L.A. Guns- Let You Down (2020)
- Neon Coven- Blame It On the Drugs (2020)
- Neon Coven- I'm the New Hit (2020)
- Neon Coven- Future Postponed (2020)
- L.A. Guns- Cocked and Loaded Live (2021)
- Faster Pussycat- Nola (2021)
- Neon Coven- Cuts You Up (2021)
- L.A. Guns- Checkered Past (2021)
- L.A. Guns- Black Diamonds (2023)
- L.A. Guns- Leopard Skin (2025)
- L.A. Guns- Live From the Guild Theatre- [CD & DVD]- (2026)

=== As guest musician ===
- The Bouncing Souls- The Gold Record [backing vocals] (2006)
- Jerry Montano's Down & Dirty- Self Titled [additional guitars] (2009)
- New Tales To Tell- A Tribute to Love and Rockets ["Sweet Love Hangover"- Charlie & The Valentine Killers] (2009)
- The Generators- Between the Devil and the Deep Blue Sea [additional lead/rhythm guitars] (2009)
- Michael Jackson- Hollywood Tonight Sessions [lead/ rhythm guitars- unreleased] (2010)
- Butcher Babies- Welcome to the Meat Show [lead/ rhythm guitars, co-wrote "After the Machines"] (2010)
- The Rattlesnake Aces- Black Pegasus [additional lead/rhythm guitars on "Breaker, Breaker"] (2011)
- Diana Meyer- Wake Up [lead/rhythm guitars] (2013)
- Diana Meyer- A Place Where the Sun Never Goes Down [lead/rhythm guitars on "Wake Up"] (2013)
- Lola Stonecracker- Doomsday Breakdown [lead/rhythm guitars on "Using My Tricks"] (2015)
- Sparkle Party- Just Like Heaven (2019)
- The Relapse Symphony- Neat Neat Neat (2020)
- U.X. Bombs- Westworld Crisis (2020)
- Dayne Alexander & SHOCKTHEMONSTER- Losin' It (2020)
- Defiant- Viva La Revolution (2021)
- Empty Streets- Age of Regret (2021)
- The Last Drive-In- Joe Bob's Heartbreak Trailer Park Soundtrack [co-wrote & guitars on "Stick Shift Drive-In Love"] (2022)
- Tiffany- Shadows [guitar on "Keep on Swinging"] (2022)
- Black Widow Conspiracy- Comin' to Get Ya (2023)
- Kalamity Kills- Self Titled [guitar on "Hellfire Honey"] (2023)
- Agent 51- Mystifying (2024)
- John Brennan and the Bigfeet- Original Series Soundtrack Vol.2 (2024)
- The Undead- Act Your Rage Again [guitar on "We Don't Want the Poor in New York City"] (2025)
- Agent 51- Age of Validation [guitar on "We've Got X-Ray Vision"] (2025)
- Agent 51- "San Diego Gulls Victory Song" [guitar solo] (2026)

== Miscellaneous ==
=== Animal Advocacy ===
- Von Johnson is an animal shelter volunteer who also has a dog rescue page via Instagram.
- He is also a Petco Love Partner helping to spotlight dogs in animal shelters across the U.S.
- He is also an advocate for Pitbull type dogs, and routinely donates to various non-profits.

=== Videos ===
- Bad Boys For Life Tour DVD [with the Generators] (2005)
- Magma Fest '07 DVD [with Murphy's Law] (2007)
- Cheap Sex – Dead Today: 5 Years of Cheap Sex DVD/Bonus CD (2009)
- The 69 Eyes- 30 Years of Rock 'n' Roll Documentary [narrates and appears in] (2019)
- Y&T: On With the Show DVD [appears in] (2019)
- Corey Taylor- Samantha's Gone music video [featured in Rolling Stone article, January 13, 2021] (2021)
- The History of Metal and Horror Documentary DVD [appears in] (2021)

=== Netflix Series (Dubbing) ===
- Money Heist, Season 3- Various voices (2019)
- Marianne, Season 1- Episode 1- Pierre (2019)
- The Woods, Season 1- Wojtek Malczak (2020)

=== Recognition ===
- August 2016- Von Johnson has a reserved table (with plaque) at the Rainbow Bar & Grill.
- December 16, 2016- Von Johnson has a Gibson Les Paul guitar on display at the Rainbow Bar & Grill as well.
- March 30, 2019- Von Johnson received the (Richard) Pryor's Platinum People Award.
