= Covert action =

Covert action may refer to:

- Covert operation, a military operation intended to conceal one's identity
- Covert action in clandestine HUMINT, a form of espionage/intelligence
- Covert Action (album), a 2003 album by U.S. Bombs
- Covert Action (film), a 1978 film directed by Romolo Guerrieri
- CovertAction Quarterly, an anti-CIA magazine
- Sid Meier's Covert Action, a 1990 action and strategy video game
