= Veni Vidi Vici (album) =

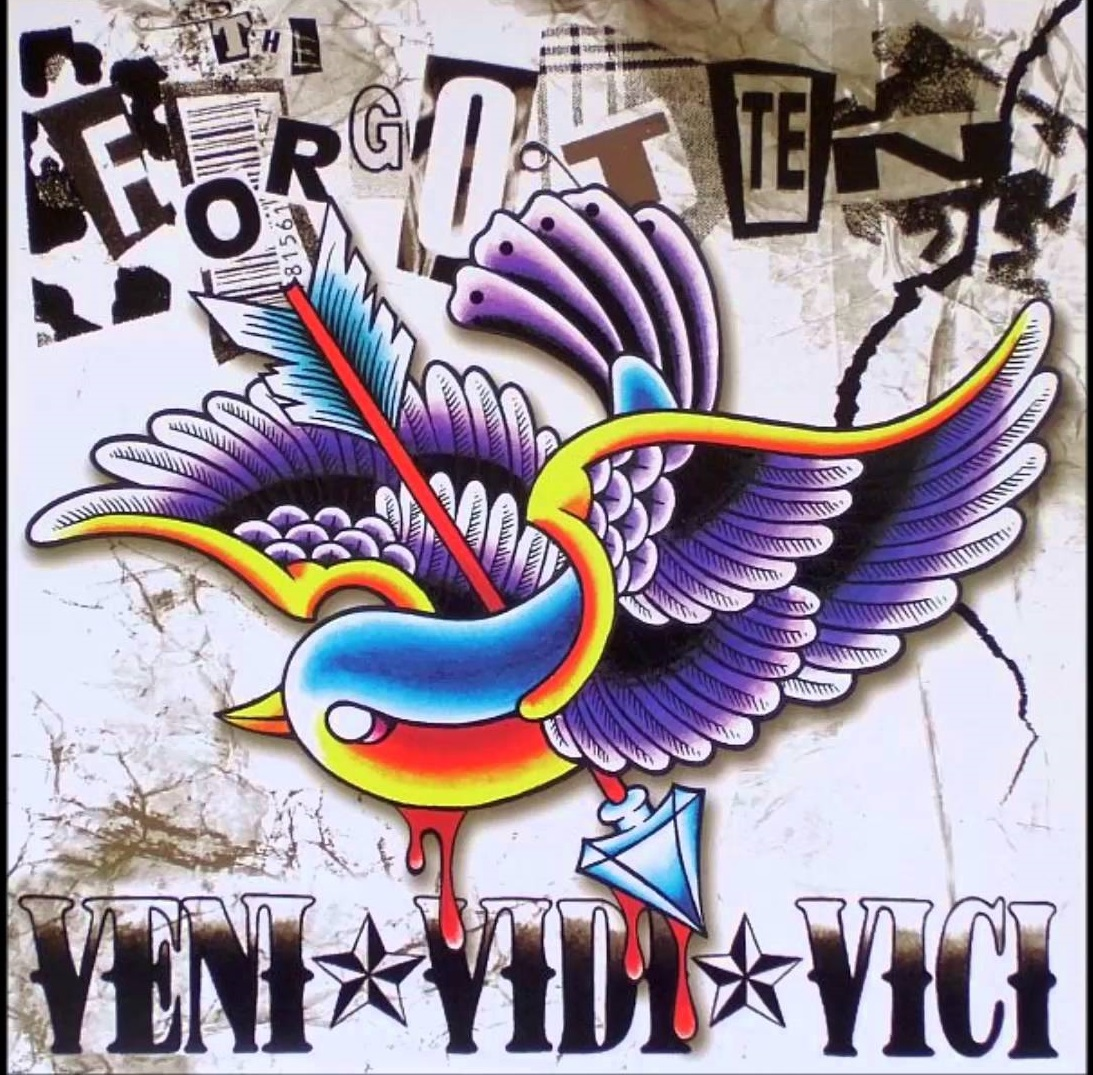
- Cover art by Robert Klem

Studio album by The Forgotten
- Released: December 22, 1998
- Recorded: 2008 at Studio B, Campbell, CA
- Genre: Punk rock
- Length: 34:00
- Label: TKO Records
- Producer: Lars Frederiksen

The Forgotten chronology
| Veni Vidi Vici (1998) | Keep the Corpses Quiet (2000) |

Veni Vidi Vici is the debut album from punk rock band The Forgotten. It is their second release under TKO Records, overall release No. 12 by the label itself. It was released in 1998 on blue vinyl and CD, re-released in 2000 on black vinyl. It contains the band's most popular song, "Fists Up".

== Track listing ==
All music is composed by The Forgotten.

| No. | Title | Length |
|---|---|---|
| 1. | "I'm Bored" | 1:54 |
| 2. | "2nd Class Citizen" | 2:27 |
| 3. | "Won't Stay Long" | 2:22 |
| 4. | "Stand Alone" | 4:01 |
| 5. | "Another Shot" | 2:20 |
| 6. | "Fists Up" | 3:06 |
| 7. | "Right" | 1:41 |
| 8. | "Stay Away" | 2:11 |
| 9. | "Imposter" | 2:03 |
| 10. | "Class Separation" | 2:45 |
| 11. | "Cheated" | 2:07 |
| 12. | "Shot Down" | 3:04 |
| Total length: | | 34:00 |

== Personnel ==
- Gordy Carbone – lead vocals
- Craig Fairbaugh – guitar, vocals
- Ken Helwig – bass guitar, vocals
- Todd Loomis – drums

Artwork

- Album cover art – Robert Klem
- Photography (back photo) – Trish Leeper
- Photography (band photo 1) – Corey Buckingham
- Photography (band photos 2 through 4) – Trish Leeper
- Photography (thanks photo) – Prozak

Production

- Lars Frederiksen – producer
- Brett Tyson – engineer
