= Die' Hunns =

American punk rock band

Die Hunns (originally known as Duane Peters and the Hunns) is an American punk rock band formed in 2000 by front-man Duane Peters, of US Bombs. The band has featured a rotating cast of musicians with Peters as the only constant. In 2002, Peters met Corey Parks (sister of former NBA basketball player Cherokee Parks), formerly of Nashville Pussy, at The Damned show. Parks would later join the band as both a vocalist and bassist.

The band did a reunion show in the spring of 2012 at the Orange County Punk Rock Picnic under their original name "Duane Peters and the Hunns", which reunited some of the original members. Since then the revived lineup has stayed together to play shows in the southern California area periodically.

== Discography ==
- "Not Gonna Pay" 7" (2000)
- Unite LP (2000)
- Tickets to Heaven LP (2001)
- Wayward Bantams LP (2002)
- Split CD w/ The Revolvers
- "Wild" 7"
- Long Legs LP (2004)
- Time Has Come Today" 7"
- "Marshall Law" 7" Split with Radio One
- You Rot Me LP (2006)
- Live Fast... Die Hunns LP (2007)
- Live In Chi-Town DVD (Ambervillain Films)
