= We Are the Problem =

Studio album by U.S. Bombs
- Released: April 4, 2006
- Genre: Punk rock
- Label: Sailors Grave Records
- Producer: Duane Peters, U.S. Bombs

U.S. Bombs chronology
Covert Action (2003)	We Are the Problem (2006)	Road Case (2018)

We Are The Problem is the eighth studio album by U.S. Bombs. It was released on April 4, 2006, on Sailor's Grave Records. TheBoyDeadly of DrownedInSound reviewed the album in 2006, describing it as a "glorious mess" and giving it a rating of 6/10.

== Track listing ==
1. "We Are The Problem"
2. "Don't Get Me Wrong"
3. "Do It Again"
4. "Revolution Weekend"
5. "Heartbreak Motel"
6. "4th of July"
7. "Destroy The Nation"
8. "Hammered Again"
9. "Last Dischord"
10. "Just Like You"
11. "Locked In My Skin"
12. "Guns Of The West"
13. "Back Inside"
14. "Tonight"
15. "Cheers"
16. “Out Of Control” (Japanese release only)

== Personnel ==
- Duane Peters – Vocals
- Kerry Martinez – Guitar, harmonica, piano, banjo, bass guitar
- Curt Stitch – Guitar
- Jamie Reiding – Drums

=== Additional personnel ===
- Doug Summers - Piano
- Andy Dahill, Zander Schloss - Bass guitar
