= Out of Print (The Forgotten album) =

Studio album by The Forgotten
- Released: May 20, 2003
- Recorded: 1997–2000
- Studio: Studio B, Campbell, California; Stout Studios, San Francisco, California; Soundtek Studios, Campbell, California
- Genre: Punk rock
- Length: 41:07
- Label: BYO Records
- Producer: The Forgotten

The Forgotten chronology
Control Me (2002)	Out of Print (2003)	The Forgotten (2008)

Professional ratings
Review scores
Source	Rating
AllMusic	3/5 stars
PunkNews	3.5/5 stars

Out of Print is the fourth album from punk rock band The Forgotten. It is their second release under BYO Records.

== Track listing ==
All music is composed by The Forgotten.

No.	Title	Length
1.	"Skunx"	2:25
2.	"Class Separation"	2:56
3.	"Horror Show"	2:09
4.	"The Corp"	1:16
5.	"Battle on the Streets"	1:47
6.	"Nothing To Lose"	1:48
7.	"Trouble"	2:51
8.	"Imposter"	2:53
9.	"Another Shot"	2:30
10.	"Guilty"	2:06
11.	"No Control"	2:43
12.	"Breakaway"	2:29
13.	"We're Alright"	2:29
14.	"The Freedom"	2:23
15.	"Silent Weapons"	2:17
16.	"American Rock N Roll Rebellion"	2:46
17.	"Lost in Time"	1:28
18.	"Ain't Gonna Lose The War"	1:51
Total length:		47:01

== Personnel ==
- Gordy Carbone – lead vocals
- Craig Fairbaugh – guitar, vocals
- Ken Helwig – bass guitar, vocals, tracks 1–14
- Gabe Gossack – bass guitar, vocals, tracks 15–18
- Shea Roberts – drums, tracks 1–6
- Todd Loomis – drums, tracks 7–14
- Dave Kashka – drums, tracks 15–18

Production

- Lars Frederiksen – producer, tracks 1–6
- The Forgotten – producer, tracks 7–18
- Brett Tyson – engineer, tracks 1–6
- Robert Berry – engineer, tracks 8–18
