= Richard Owens =

Richard, Rich, Ricky, Rick and Dick Owens may refer to:

- Dick Owens (1812–1902), American frontiersman, companion of Kit Carson, a/k/a Richard Lemon Owings
- Richard Owens (architect) (1831–1891), Welsh builder of urban housing in Liverpool
- Richard Owens (bishop) (1840–1909), Irish Catholic bishop of Clogher
- Rich Owens (corrections officer) (1880–1948), American executioner in Oklahoma, 1918–1947
- Ricky Owens (1939–1996), American singer, member of The Vibrations
- Rick Owens (born 1962), American fashion designer
- Rich Owens (born 1972), American football defensive lineman
- Richard Owens (poet) (born 1973), American publisher and critic
- Richard Owens (American football) (born 1980), American tight end

== See also ==
- Richard Owen (disambiguation)
