= Written in Blood =

Written in Blood may refer to:

- Written in Blood (Cheap Sex album), a 2006 street punk album
- Written in Blood (Darkness Divided album), a 2014 metalcore album
- Written in Blood (novel), a 1994 crime novel by Caroline Graham
