= Control Me =

Studio album by The Forgotten
- Released: September 3, 2002
- Studio: Track Record in North Hollywood, California and BYO Records
- Genre: Punk rock
- Length: 36:47
- Label: BYO Records
- Producer: The Forgotten

The Forgotten chronology
Keep the Corpses Quiet (2000)	Control Me (2002)	Out of Print (2003)

Professional ratings
Review scores
Source	Rating
AllMusic	3/5 stars
PunkNews	3.5/5 stars

Control Me is the third album from punk rock band The Forgotten. It is their first release under BYO Records. It was released in September 2002 on black vinyl and CD. It contains one of the band's most popular songs, "Retrofitted".

== Track listing ==
All music is composed by The Forgotten.

No.	Title	Length
1.	"Respect & Lies"	3:42
2.	"Retrofitted"	2:50
3.	"Listen"	3:51
4.	"Never Accepted"	2:34
5.	"Social Security"	3:27
6.	"Pulling Strings"	2:56
7.	"Same Old Story"	2:49
8.	"We Gotta Know"	2:24
9.	"Don't Gotta Worry"	2:27
10.	"Rebellion"	2:56
11.	"No Way To Live"	3:00
12.	"Our Response"	3:51
Total length:		36:47

== Personnel ==
- Gordy Carbone – lead vocals
- Craig Fairbaugh – guitar, vocals
- Johnny (Bleachedjeans) Gregurich – bass guitar, vocals
- Dave Kashka – drums

Production

- Steve Kravak and The Forgotten – producer
- Steve Kravak – engineer
