= Launch Off to War =

Studio album by Cheap Sex
- Released: Jul 15, 2003
- Recorded: 2003
- Genre: Street punk
- Length: 27:52
- Label: Punk Core

Cheap Sex chronology
Launch Off to War (2003)	Headed for a Breakdown (2004)

Professional ratings
Review scores
Source	Rating
Allmusic	link
Artistdirect	link

Launch Off to War is the debut album by the American Street punk band Cheap Sex, released in 2003 by Punk Core Records.

== Track listing ==
1. Launch Off to War (2:37)
2. Consume and Consume (1:59)
3. Take a Chance (2:26)
4. Smash Your Symbols (2:12)
5. Eyes See All (2:37)
6. Dead Today (2:30)
7. If Society... (2:34)
8. Dick Cheney (1:57)
9. Its Up to You (1:45)
10. Living in Fear (2:17)
11. Out on Your Own (2:54)
12. Backstabber (1:58)

== Credits ==
- Bernard Torelli - Mastering, Mixing
- Mange - Photography
- Sean Morrissey - Assistant
- Mike Virus - Vocals
- Johnny O. Negative - Guitar, Engineer
- Gabe Skunt - Drums, Layout Design
- J. Ace Von Johnson - Guitar
