= The Krays =

The Krays may refer to:

- Kray twins, 1950s–1960s British organised crime leaders
- The Krays (film) (1990), directed by Peter Medak, about the Kray twins
- The Krays (band), a streetpunk band founded 1994 in Brooklyn, New York
