= Ruyter Suys =

Canadian-American musician (born 1968)

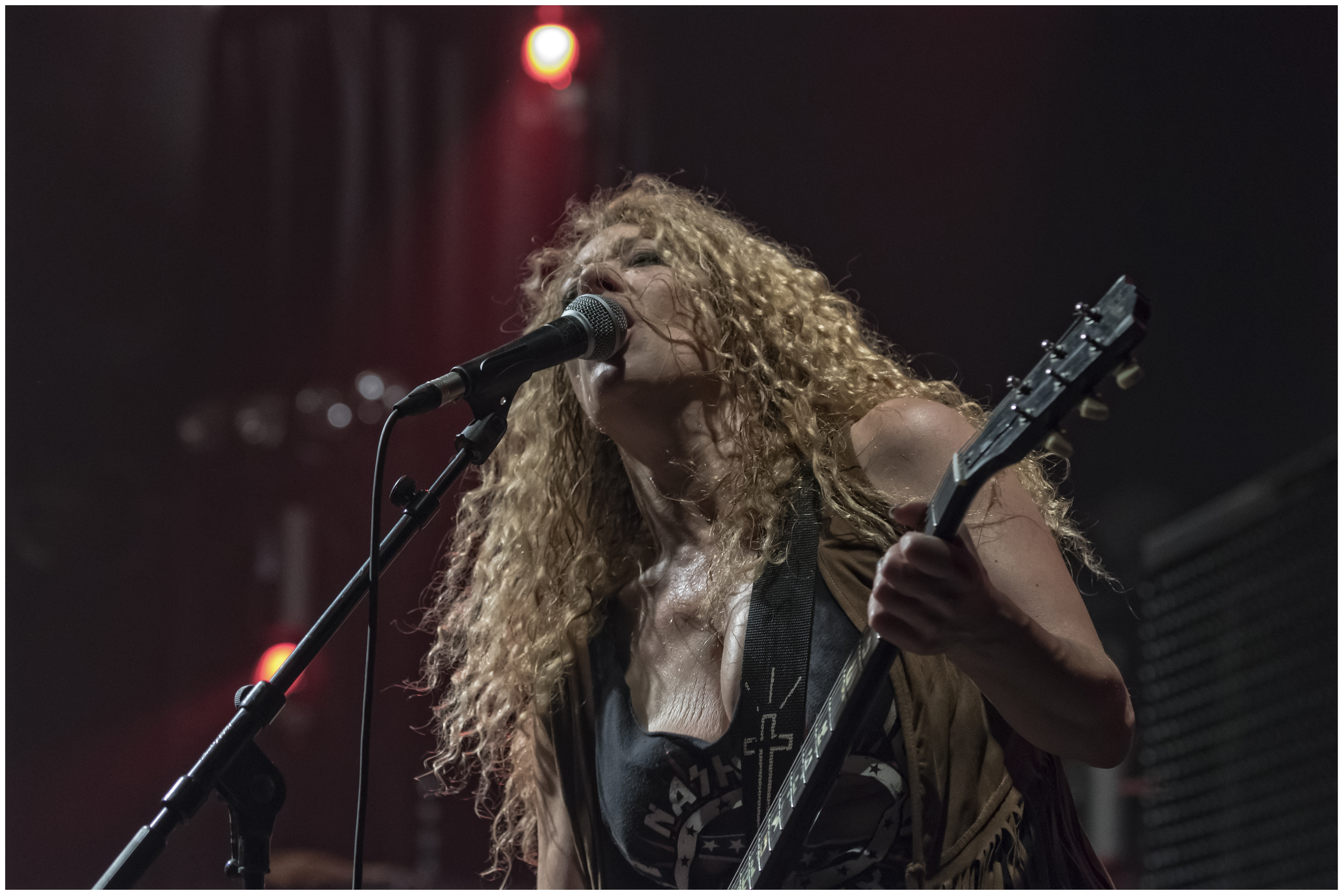
Suys in 2017

Ruyter Lara Johanna Pakon Suys (born November 5, 1968) is the lead guitar player of the band Nashville Pussy, and lead singer Blaine Cartwright's wife.

== Early life ==
Suys spent her youth in Vancouver with a musical family, particularly fans of rock and roll in the vein of Led Zeppelin, David Bowie, and Frank Zappa. Beginning with piano at age three, she picked up the guitar at about eight or nine years old, referring to the repertoire of Simon & Garfunkel in particular. At the end of primary school, she got her first guitar from her parents. In her teens, she was influenced by bands like Motörhead, Slayer, Metallica, Plasmatics, Kiss, Aerosmith and Ted Nugent. Suys's main female influences include Nancy Wilson of Heart, and Wendy O. Williams.

After high school, Suys moved to Saskatoon where she attended the University of Saskatchewan with a Bachelor of Fine Arts degree, graduating at the top of three classes and a magna cum laude honour. While in Saskatchewan, she created artistic bronze castings and also spent some time on a farm driving a tractor. After marrying Blaine Cartwright and moving to the United States, he convinced her to start a band with him.

== Music career ==
She has been the lead guitarist of the band Nashville Pussy since 1996, alongside her husband, singer/guitarist Blaine Cartwright. Suys is known for her guitar solos and live performances. She was named in the Elle list of "12 Greatest Female Electric Guitarists" in 2009.

When I play I barely even see what's going on around me. It's like I'm hypnotizing myself or something like that with the volume, and I'm just breathing in really deep and I just fill myself up with the sonic bombast. I have my eyes shut half the night and I basically see obstacles if I'm lucky, like "don't hit your head on this" and like "don't step in this hole in the stage" or whatever. I know where things are, but usually I just "go away and disappear into my own little world". It's up there with really good sex, you know.

Also known for her sympathy towards fans, Ruyter answers comments fans make and gives attention to almost all fans after gigs.

Suys has also played with comedy rock band Dick Delicious and the Tasty Testicles, having been a guest artist for their 2013 record and tour.
