= Thug Murder =

Japanese streetpunk all-female band

Thug Murder were an influential streetpunk all-female band from Japan. Though their songs were written and performed in English, their heavy Japanese accents made the lyrics largely unintelligible. The band was formed in November 1999 and split after two years, in October 2001. Thug Murder toured the US and EU with the Dropkick Murphys in 2001. They're also known for playing with The Boils, The Casualties and The Unseen, among others. Their American debut was released on Dropkick Murphys's Flat Records.

In 2002, Ryoko formed the similarly styled band Last Target and released the song "One Shot, One Kill". "One Shot, One Kill" is distributed by the BENTEN Label.

== Lineup ==
- Ryoko Naitoh - Guitar and vocals
- Chisato Ohtsubo - Bass and vocals
- Yurie Sakuma - Drums and vocals

== Discography ==
- 'Punch Drunk 3 (2000) - (TKO Records)
- 13th Round (2001) – (TKO Records)
- Thug Murder (1999)-EP) - (Luck Records)
