= Dick Delicious and the Tasty Testicles =

American musical group

Dick Delicious and the Tasty Testicles are an American comedy / metal band from Atlanta, Georgia. The band formed in 1992 and released three albums between 1995 and 2003. In 2003, they received the "Howard Stern Award for Musical Excellence" and broke up shortly afterward.

In 2011, the band reformed with guitarist Ruyter Suys from southern rock band Nashville Pussy, and recorded a new album featuring members of Nashville Pussy, Mastodon, and Brutal Truth.

In early 2011 the band's fourth album, A Vulgar Display of Obscurity, was released on Slinging Pig Records and went on to sell a negative number of copies.

At a reunion show at The Star Bar in 2007, Dick said he was a better guitar player than KK Downing and Glenn Tipton put together.
