= Mike Dimkich =

American guitarist

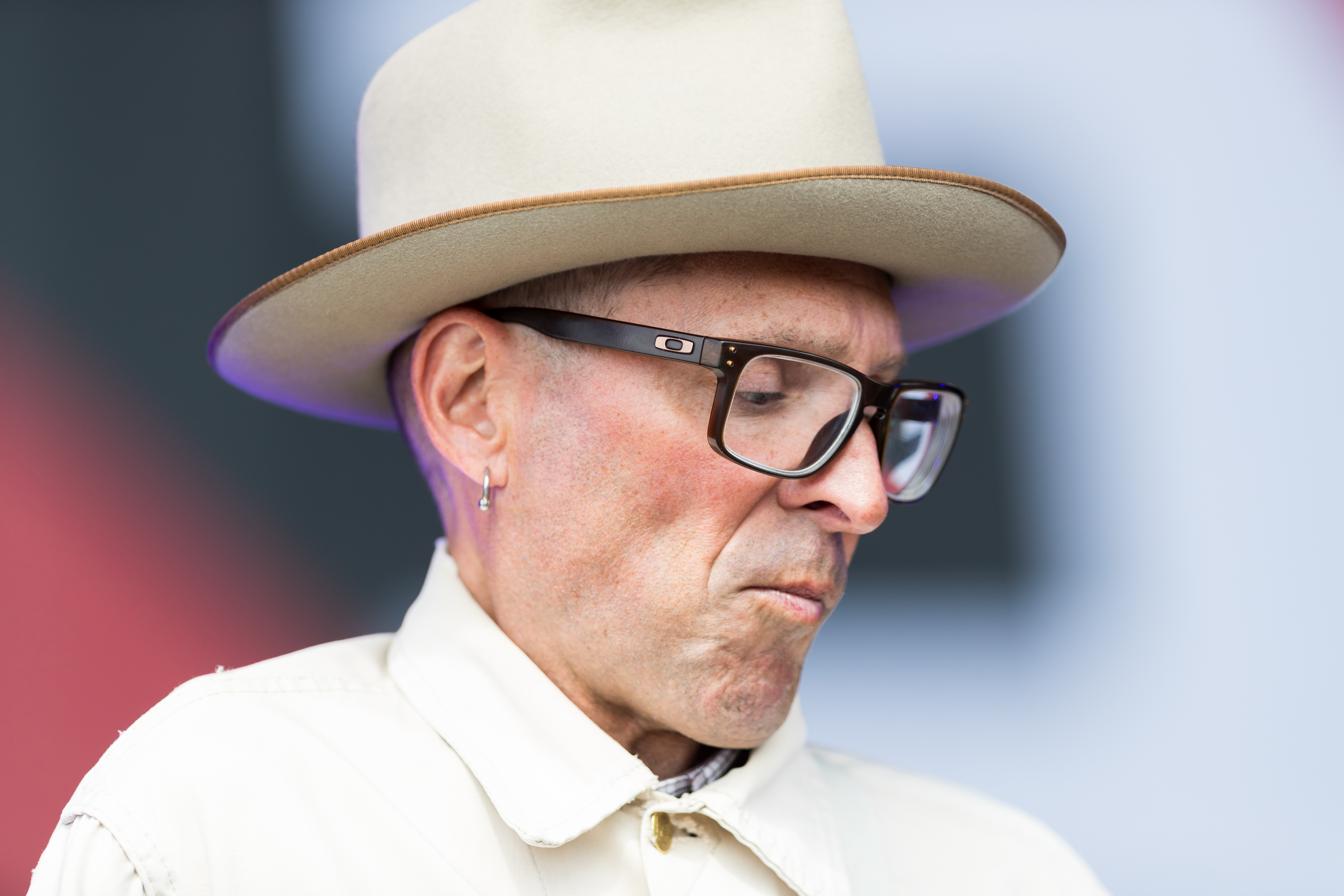
- Dimkich playing with Bad Religion in 2018 at Rock am Ring

Background information
- Born: Michael John Dimkich; February 15, 1968 (age 58)
- Origin: Los Angeles, California, United States
- Genres: Punk rock, alternative rock, hard rock, heavy metal
- Occupations: Musician, guitarist
- Instrument: guitar
- Years active: 1986–present
- Member of: Bad Religion
- Formerly of: The Cult, Channel 3, Suckerpunch

Mike Dimkich (born Michael John Dimkich; February 15, 1968) is an American guitarist who is currently a member of the punk rock band Bad Religion. He has also played for The Cult, Channel 3, Suckerpunch, and Steve Jones.

== Musical career ==
Dimkich started playing in the California punk rock band Channel 3 in 1986. In 1989 he played guitar with Steve Jones of the Sex Pistols, and opened with Jones for The Cult. The Cult asked Dimkich to join them on rhythm guitar in 1993, and he remained a member until 2013, when he joined Bad Religion to replace Greg Hetson. James Stevenson replaced Dimkich as The Cult's guitarist.

He has also recorded a 1995 album with Suckerpunch, and played on the 2009 Cheap Trick album The Latest.

== Personal life ==
Dimkich is of Serbian descent (Serbian surname: Димкић, Dimkić), hence his nickname The Serb. He is an ultra-marathon runner and a competitive road cyclist. He began running ultra-marathon races officially in 2001 and as of 2003, had run more than ten. More recently, he has begun participating in competitive road cycling.
