= Back at the Laundromat =

Studio album by U.S. Bombs
- Released: March 2001
- Recorded: 2001
- Genre: Punk rock
- Label: Hellcat Records
- Producer: U.S. Bombs

U.S. Bombs chronology
The World (1999)	Back at the Laundromat (2001)	Covert Action (2003)

Professional ratings
Review scores
Source	Rating
AllMusic	4/5 stars
Rock Hard	4/10

Back at the Laundromat is an album by U.S. Bombs, released in 2001.

== Critical reception ==
Exclaim! praised the "tough yet melodic sound," writing that "a Sex Pistols influence runs through this and is bolstered by the snarling vocals of skate legend Duane Peters."

== Track listing ==
All tracks by Peters/Martinez except as noted

1. "Tora Tora Tora"
2. "Die Alone" (Peters/Walston)
3. "The Rubber Room"
4. "Lunch In A Sack"
5. "Bloody Rag"
6. "New Killer" (Peters/Hanna)
7. "Cirenda"
8. "The Contract"
9. "The Wig Out"
10. "Rumble Fishers"
11. "Yer Country"
12. "Good Night" (Peters/Walston)

== Personnel ==
- Duane Peters - lead vocals
- Kerry Martinez - guitar, background vocals
- Wade Walston - bass, background vocals
- Chip Hanna - drums, background vocals, record engineer
