= Evacuate (band) =

LA hardcore band

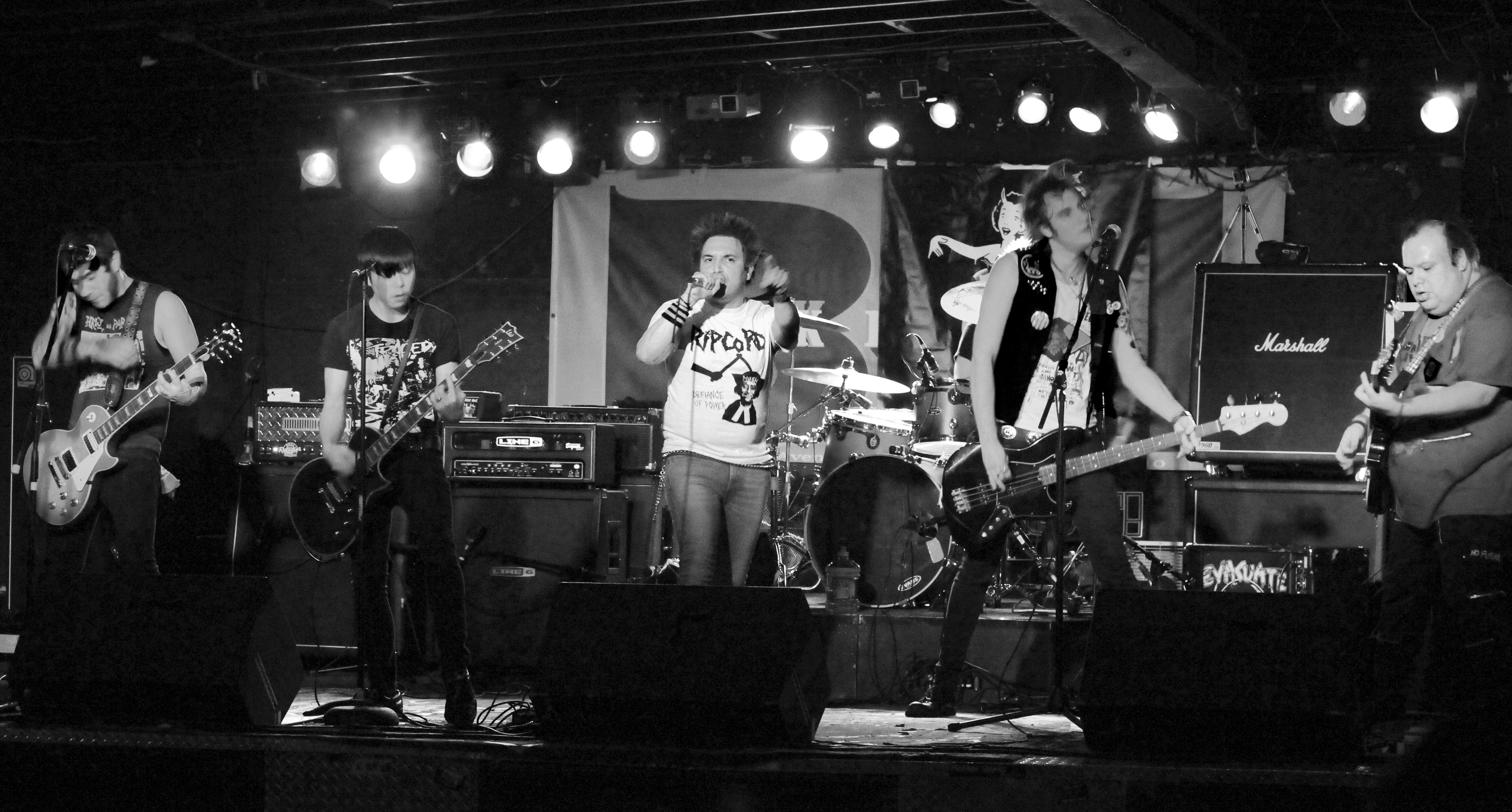
- Evacuate performing live in 2014

Background information
- Origin: US
- Genre: Street punk
- Years active: 2007–present
- Label: Taang!/Joe Pogo Records/Evacuate Records
- Members: Mike Virus; Karlos; Riff; Tony; Kevin K.
- Past members: Kevin Nguyen; Sean; Brock Anderson; Phil Robles; Ryan Fetter; Danny; John Arias; John Cesena
- Website: www.evacuatepunks.com

Evacuate is an American hardcore punk band from Los Angeles. With influences ranging from the Sex Pistols, Chelsea, U.K. Subs, Broken Bones, Negative Approach and the English Dogs, the band's releases and live sets cover a wide range of the punk rock spectrum.

== History ==
=== Beginning: 2007-2008 ===
Started by founding members vocalist Mike Virus (ex- The Virus/Cheap Sex) and lead guitarist Karlos Evacuate (ex-Lab Rats), also featuring ex Cheap Sex members Brock on bass and guitarist Phil, and Ryan on drums. The original lineup wrote the first two Evacuate songs, "Convenience Killed Mankind" and "In My Dreams". Months later Phil, Brock and Ryan left to form side projects, and Mike and Karlos carried on recruiting bass player Sean, guitarist John A. (All Out Attak) and Danny (2nd Hand Justice) on drums. This lineup wrote songs "What Happened to Hardcore" and "Give You Nothing", which were recorded along with the first two songs to complete Evacuate's first demo "Evacuate 2007". This lineup also wrote part of the first LP and played the first handful of shows. John A. left and was replaced by Tony on second guitar and helped finish writing the first LP. After a few shows Danny left and was replaced by John Cesena on drums.

=== Foundation: 2008-2010 ===
This lineup recorded the band's first official release - the self-titled "Evacuate" CD/LP, which was released in 2008 on Taang/Joe Pogo, and the Endless War EP on Czech label Voltage Records in 2010. They shared the stage with Fear, The Germs, U.K. Subs and Bad Religion. This incarnation of Evacuate lasted two years until 2010 when Sean was replaced by Kevin Nguyen of "Sayaka" on bass.

=== Endless War Across Europe: 2010-2011 ===
This lineup recorded Evacuate's second full length offering 2012 also on Voltage released in late 2011, this lineup played regularly throughout 2010 and 2011 including a full tour of Europe with the Mad Pigs, also sharing the stage with SS-Kaliert, Vox Populi and Normahl!. Evacuate also put together a benefit show for the victims of Japan's catastrophic tsunami.

=== Trials and Tribulations: 2012-2013 ===
2012 brought some adversity to the band, with members Kevin Nguyen and Tony taking a hiatus from the band. Evacuate continued on as a four-piece with Kevin Kane joining on bass. This lineup played a handful of shows including a debut show with the Vibrators, Kevin Sayaka returned on second guitar from his hiatus and Evacuate continued as a five-piece, this came with the announcement that Evacuate would be playing the Rebellion Festival in Blackpool, England, the band worked all of mid 2013 playing shows and raising funds to head across the pond. Then things took a bad turn with longtime drummer John C, having to leave the band to fight personal demons, leaving Evacuate with a commitment to play in England with no drummer, it seemed like all hope was lost until longtime friend Alan from the band Destruct offered to fill in for the trip. This coincided with Tony's return from hiatus and adding a third guitar adding an extra layer to Evacuate's sound.

=== Anarchy in the UK: 2013 Continued ===
Evacuate complete with the updated six-man lineup finally ventured out to the UK. This saw the band playing two critically acclaimed sets, the first a surprise set replacing Mad Sin supporting the Defects in the arena stage, which saw members of Chelsea join Evacuate on stage to play a cover version of Chelsea's hit single "Evacuate", which is where the band's name came from. The second set, which was their originally advertised stage time, back in the arena stage. As the band returned, a new drummer Raul "Riff-Raff" Cuellar was recruited, and it was back to work until a near tragedy struck one of the band member's family; this situation hit close to home with everyone in the band and threatened the existence of the band, but with the help of friends, family, and fans around the world, the situation improved enough for the band to continue moving forward.

=== 2014 and beyond ===
As 2013 drew to a close, the news broke of Evacuate joining up with The Virus and The Bad Engrish for a West Coast tour in the spring of 2014. Evacuate released a limited-edition orange-colored flexi with two new songs, complete with a special fanzine sleeve/packaging. This was a preview of their next album, Blood Money.

== Discography ==
- Demo 2007
- Evacuate LP 2009
- Endless War EP 2010
- 2012 LP 2011
- "Our Lives" / "Rage" single 2014 500 copies
- Blood Money LP 2014

== Members ==
- Mike Virus (Vocals) 2007–present
- Karlos - (Lead guitar) 2007–present
- Riff Raff (Drums) 2013–present
- Tony (Rhythm guitar) 2008–present
- Kevin Kane (Bass) 2012–present

Past members

- Kevin Nguyen (Rhythm guitar) 2010–2015
- John Arias - (Rhythm guitar) 2007-2008
- Sean Swales - (Bass)2007-2010
- Danny - (Drums)2007-2008
- John Cesena - (Drums)2008-2013
- Phil Robles 2007 (Rhythm guitar) 2007
- Brock Anderson 2007n(Bass) 2007
- Ryan - (Drums) 2007
