= Headed for a Breakdown =

Studio album by Cheap Sex
- Released: October 12, 2004
- Recorded: June 2004
- Genre: Street punk
- Length: 41:34
- Label: Punk Core

Cheap Sex chronology
Launch Off to War (2003)	Headed for a Breakdown (2004)	Written in Blood (2006)

Headed for a Breakdown is the second album from Cheap Sex. The album was recorded with Punk Core Records.

== Track listing ==
1. "False Pride" - 3:14
2. "Last of the True" - 2:13
3. "Desperation" - 3:11
4. "Lucky to Be Alive" - 2:45
5. "Reality TV" - 1:35
6. "Water Runs Dry" - 2:43
7. "Worst Nightmare" - 2:09
8. "Headed for a Breakdown" - 1:49
9. "White Sheep" - 1:45
10. "Raped by the FCC" - 2:51
11. "Child Molester" - 2:48
12. "Walking Disease" - 3:41
13. "Boy in a Bubble" - 10:43
14. "Fuck Emo" (hidden track)

== Credits ==
- Bridget - Photography
- Brian - Photography
- Kerch - Album Art
- Alan Douches - Mastering
- Jeff Forrest - Engineer

== Sources ==
Sing365.com album page
