= Shock Nagasaki =

American punk rock band

Shock Nagasaki is an American punk rock band from Brooklyn, New York, United States. Originally from Syracuse, New York. They are currently signed to TKO Records. Originally released by the Netherlands-based Rebellion Records, the band's debut album, The Year of the Spy, was re-issued by TKO Records. The band's current lineup includes Bryan Lopus on drums, Jamie Coville on vocals and guitar, Widing on guitar, and Jake Brock on bass. Shock Nagasaki's single "Hit the Beach" (2007) broadened the band's fan base, receiving significant airplay on Sirius Satellite Radio's Punk channel.

== Albums ==
The Year of the Spy (2007)
