= Richard Owen (disambiguation) =

Richard Owen (1804–1892) was an English biologist, comparative anatomist and palaeontologist.

Richard Owen is also the name of:

- Richard Owen (geologist) (1810–1890), Scottish-born American geologist, American Civil War officer, Indiana University professor, Purdue University president
  - Bust of Richard Owen
- Richard Owen (minister) (1839–1887), Welsh Calvinistic minister
- Richard Owen (judge) (1922–2015), American composer and federal judge for the United States District Court for the Southern District of New York
- Richard Owen (rugby league) (born 1990), rugby league player for the Castleford Tigers
- Richard Owen (priest) (1899–1977), Archdeacon of St Asaph, 1964–1970

== See also ==
- Richard Owens (disambiguation)
