= Covert Action (album) =

Studio album by U.S. Bombs
- Released: March 2003
- Recorded: 2003
- Genre: Punk rock
- Label: Hellcat Records
- Producer: Darian Rundall; U.S. Bombs

U.S. Bombs chronology
Back at the Laundromat (2001)	Covert Action (2003)	We Are the Problem (2006)

Covert Action is an album by U.S. Bombs.

== Line up for recording ==
- Duane Peters- Vocals
- Kerry Martinez- Guitars
- Curt Stitch - guitar
- Jamie Reiding- Drums
- Wade Walston- Bass

== Track listing ==
1. "Roll Around"
2. "Shot Down"
3. "Youth Goes"
4. "Croatia Breaks"
5. "Framed"
6. "John Gotti"
7. "The Gow"
8. "Art Kills"
9. "Lab Rats"
10. "Majestic Twelve"
11. "In & Out"
12. "Faith Of Marie"
13. "American Made"
