= Let Them Eat Pussy =

Studio album by Nashville Pussy
- Released: 1998
- Genre: Hard rock, Southern rock
- Length: 27:16
- Label: The Enclave
- Producer: Kurt Bloch

Nashville Pussy chronology
Let Them Eat Pussy (1998)	High As Hell (2000)

Let Them Eat Pussy is the debut album by the American rock band Nashville Pussy, released in 1998. The album helped to create a fanbase for the band, and the song "Fried Chicken and Coffee" was nominated for a Grammy Award for "Best Metal Performance".

== Critical reception ==
Professional ratings
Review scores
Source	Rating
AllMusic	4/5 stars

The Toronto Star deemed Let Them Eat Pussy a "raw, cranked-up and absolutely searing debut album."

AllMusic, in a four-star review, said: "Let Them Eat Pussy is all about sleaze, and it's the sleaziest record in years."

== Track listing ==
All songs written by Blaine Cartwright, except where noted.

1. "Snake Eyes" – 1:29
2. "Goin' Down" – 2:08
3. "Go Motherfucker Go" – 1:59
4. "I'm the Man" – 2:16
5. "All Fucked Up" – 1:51
6. "Johnny Hotrod" – 2:56
7. "5 Minutes to Live" – 2:19
8. "Somebody Shoot Me" – 2:09
9. "Blowin' Smoke" – 1:34
10. "First I Look at the Purse" (Smokey Robinson, Bobby Rogers) – 2:05
11. "Eat My Dust" – 1:50
12. "Fried Chicken and Coffee" – 4:26

== Eat More Pussy EP track listing ==
1. "Kicked in the Teeth" – 3:25 (written by Angus Young, Malcolm Young and Bon Scott; originally performed by AC/DC)
2. "Nice Boys" – 2:47 (written by Gary Anderson, Peter Wells, Mick Cocks, Geordie Leach and Dallas Royall; originally performed by Rose Tattoo)
3. "Milk Cow Blues" – 3:07 (written and originally performed by Kokomo Arnold)
4. "Headin' for the Texas Border" – 2:58 (written by Cyril Jordan and Roy Loney; originally performed by The Flamin' Groovies)
5. "Sock It to Me Baby" – 2:24 (written by L. Russell Brown and Bob Crewe; originally performed by Mitch Ryder & The Detroit Wheels)
6. "(I'm) Misunderstood" – 2:35 (written by Chris Bailey and Ed Kuepper; originally performed by The Saints)

The Eat More Pussy EP was included in the UK as a bonus disc.
