= War Birth =

Studio album by U.S. Bombs
- Released: September 1997
- Recorded: 1997
- Genre: Punk rock
- Length: 40:11
- Label: Hellcat/Epitaph

U.S. Bombs chronology
Never Mind the Opened Minds (1997)	War Birth (1997)	The World (1999)

Professional ratings
Review scores
Source	Rating
AllMusic	3/5 stars
Orange County Register	3/5 stars

War Birth is an album by the punk rock band U.S. Bombs, released in 1997.

== Critical reception ==
The Los Angeles Times wrote that "the problem with War Birth isn't the materiel—vintage punk's sonic arsenal remains potent—but the material, which numbingly recycles petrified punk rock slogans and attitudes." The Orange County Register thought that "the riffs are chunky and plentiful, the lyrics plainspoken and fiery and the mission amiable, if of a piece ... U.S. Bombs' sound wears thin in spots, but you've got to admire a guy who opens his album by declaring 'if there's nothing shakin' by this July, I'm gonna shoot myself up with a speed ball and die.'"

== Track listing ==
1. "That's Life" – 2:44
2. "Orange Crunch" – 2:38
3. "Jaks" – 2:39
4. "Warstoryville" – 3:18
5. "12/25" – 3:06
6. "Outta Touch" – 2:08
7. "U.S. of Hate" – 2:42
8. "War Birth" – 3:24
9. "Hand Me the Downs" – 1:51
10. "Rocks in Memphis" – 2:48
11. "Beetle Boot" – 3:37
12. "Her & Me" – 3:58
13. "Don't Need You" – 1:58
14. "No Company Town" – 3:20
