= The Boils =

American punk rock band (1994–2009)

- Origin: Pennsylvania
- Genres: Street punk; oi!; punk rock
- Years active: 1994–2009
- Labels: Schukyill Records; TKO Records; Creep Records; Switchblade
- Past members: Greg Boyle; Dave Sausage; Jeff Berman; Eric Endrikat; Christof Endrikat; John Brennan; Oscar Capps; Mike Bardzik; Shawn FATE - Guitar West Coast '09

The Boils were an American oi! / punk rock band from Philadelphia officially formed in 1996. Their most popular song, "The Orange and The Black", is used after every Philadelphia Flyers win as of April 13, 2006. They have also played on the Warped Tour and toured the country with similar bands Oxymoron and the Casualties.

== Discography ==
=== Studio albums ===
- World Poison (1999) Cyclone Records
- Pride and Persecution (2002) TKO Records
- From The Bleachers (2005) TKO Records

=== Singles and EPs ===
- Hearts Of The Oppressed (1995) Creep
- Consuming Your Culture (split 7-inch with Sleepasaurus) (1995) Switchblade
- Tradition Ends (split 7-inch with Violent Society) (1996) Schuylkill
- All He Ever Wanted Was A Good Education / Obedience Is Your Obligation (split 7-inch with The Goons) (1996) Torque
- Anthems From The New Generation (7-inch) (1997) Beer City
- When The Sun Goes Down (1998) Creep
- Punk Rock Rumble!! (split 7-inch with The Staggers) (1999) Haunted Town
- Fight for Your Class, Not for Your Country! (split 7-inch with Brigate Rozze) (1999) Mad Butcher
- The Boils / Disorderly Conduct (split 7-inch with Disorderly Conduct) (2000) Squigtone
- Nobility & Nihilism (split CD with Last Target) (2003) Interference
- The Ripping Water E.P. (2003) Thorp
- The Boils / Thumbs Up! (split 7-inch with Thumbs Up!) (2006) Knife Or Death
- Hockey Anthems - The Orange And The Black (2007) TKO Records

=== Compilation and live albums ===
- Dad, I Can't Breathe (1995) Creep
- Matthau Records Comp (1996)
- More Kaos (1997) Motherbox
- Destroy The Creep House (1997) Creep
- Songs for the Witching Season (1997) Creep
- Don't Pogo in the Livingroom (1997) Pogostick
- Songs from the Gutter (1998) Kangaroo
- Welcome to Ground Zero (1998) Ground Zero
- Philly Shreds (1998) Schuykill
- Greasers, Punks, & Skins (1999) Squigtone
- Scene Killer Vol 2 (1999) Outsider
- Streets of Philadelphia (1999) Wonka Vision
- The Feeding of the Proles (1999) Patriotic Dissent
- Pure Punk (1999) Cyclone
- Black Eyes and Broken Bottles...We're Done Being Harassed (1999) Beer City
- Dangerously Unstable (1999) Suburban Voice
- Nevermind the Sex Pistols...Here's the Tribute (2000) Radical
- Skins and Pinz (2001) GMM
- The Last Stake Has Been Driven (2001) Creep
- Lesson for Today (2002) Almost Good Music
- Backstreets of American Oi! Street Punk Vol. 2: Ten Years Later (2006) CD Baby
