= Written in Blood (Cheap Sex album) =

Studio album by Cheap Sex
- Released: June 6, 2006
- Recorded: January 2006
- Genre: Street punk
- Length: 34:16
- Label: Punk Core

Cheap Sex chronology
Headed for a Breakdown (2004)	Written in Blood (2006)

Professional ratings
Review scores
Source	Rating
Allmusic	link
Artistdirect	link

Written in Blood is the third and final album from Cheap Sex, recorded with Punk Core Records.

== Track listing ==
1. "Worst Enemy" - 3:01
2. "War's No Game" - 2:11
3. "Excuses" - 2:53
4. "Psychopath" - 1:46
5. "No Time for You" - 1:49
6. "Rage and Revenge" - 2:04
7. "Written in Blood" - 2:28
8. "Fear in the Night" - 3:01
9. "Russian Roulette" - 1:40
10. "Secret Agenda" - 2:19
11. "Youth Offender" - 2:50
12. "Nothing to Gain" - 1:50
13. "Paranoia" - 3:50
14. "Manslaughter" - 2:27

== Members ==
- Mike Virus - Vocals
- Phil Robles - Lead guitar
- Johnny O. - Rhythm guitar
- Gabe - Drums
- Brock - Bass

== Credits ==
- Alan Douches - Mastering
- Jeff Forrest - Engineer
