= The World (U.S. Bombs album) =

Studio album by U.S. Bombs
- Released: June 1999
- Recorded: January–February 1999
- Studio: Stall #2, Redondo Beach, CA
- Genre: Punk rock
- Label: Hellcat Records

U.S. Bombs chronology
War Birth (1997)	The World (1999)	Back at the Laundromat (2001)

The World is the fourth album by U.S. Bombs.

== Track listing ==
1. The World
2. Goin' Out
3. Yanks & Rebs
4. Bombs Not Food
5. Isolated Ones
6. Skater Dater
7. Hobroken Dreams
8. Don't Take It Back
9. New Approach
10. Billy Club
11. Checkpoint
12. '76ixties
13. Nothin' On Us
14. Joe's Tune
15. So In Fuck With You
16. Salute The Dead
17. Madagascar
18. Not Enough
