= Channel 3 (band) =

American punk rock band

- Also known as: CH3
- Origin: Cerritos, California, USA
- Genres: Punk rock, hardcore punk, melodic hardcore
- Years active: 1980–present
- Labels: Posh Boy, TKO Records
- Members: Mike Magrann; Kimm Gardener; Anthony Thompson; Nick Manning
- Past members: Larry Kelly; Mike Burton; Jay Lansford; Jack DeBaun; Mike Dimkich; Dusty Watson; Alf Silva
- Website: www.chthree.com (archived)

Channel 3, also known as CH3, is an American punk rock band from Cerritos, California.

== History ==
Channel 3 was formed in 1980 by Mike Magrann (vocals, guitar), Kimm Gardner (guitar), Larry Kelly (bass), and Mike Burton (drums), in the suburban community of Cerritos, California. Their first release was a self-titled EP on California label Posh Boy Records in 1981. "Manzanar", a track from that EP, was played heavily by UK disc jockey John Peel.

In 1982, Jack DeBaun become their new drummer and their release Fear of Life was retitled I’ve Got A Gun in the UK with some differences in the track-listing.

Their next release, After The Lights Go Out, failed to recapture the interest that accompanied their first UK single. Jay Lansford, a former member of The Simpletones, Stepmothers, and The Wigglers who produced CH3's two Posh Boy albums, joined the band in 1984. Their 1985 album for Enigma Records (with Dusty Watson on drums), Last Time I Drank... revealed that the band had navigated the transition to a more straightforward rock format. Lansford and Magrann co-wrote all the original songs on the album.

== Members ==
- Mike Magrann (vocals, guitar)
- Kimm Gardener (guitar)
- Larry Kelly (bass)
- Mike Burton (drums)
- Jack Debaun (drums)
- Jay Lansford (bass, guitar)
- Mike Dimkich (bass)
- Mat Young (drums)
- Jeff Kaminsky (drums)
- Dusty Watson (drums)
- Ron Wood (drums)
- Larry Lerma (bass)
- Anthony Thompson (bass)
- Mitch McNally (bass)
- Alf Silva (drums)
- Matthew Woodruff (drums)
- Nick Manning (drums)

== Discography ==
=== LPs ===
- Fear of Life (1982, Posh Boy Records)
- After the Lights Go Out (1983, Posh Boy Records)
- Last Time I Drank... (1985, Enigma Records)
- Rejected (1989, Lone Wolf Records, Fringe Product Records)
- CH3 (2002, Dr. Strange Records)
- One More For All My True Friends (2008, TKO Records)
- Put 'Em Up (2017)

=== Singles & EP ===
- CH 3 (1981, 12", Posh Boy)
- I've Got A Gun (1982, 7", No Future Records)
- I'll Take My Chances / How Come? (1983, 7", Posh Boy Records)
- Airborne (1984, 12", Enigma Records)
- Indian Summer / Separate Peace (1991, 7", Posh Boy Records)
- One More For All My True Friends (2007, 7", Suburbia Records)
- Land of the Free (2012, 7", Hostage Records)
- History (2014, 7", Hostage Records)

=== Compilations ===
- I've Got a Gun (1982, No Future Records)
- The Skinhead Years (1989, Posh Boy Records)
- To Whom It May Concern: The 1981 Demos (2009, TKO Records)
- A Home for the Homeless (2015, Wanda Records)
