= Hatepinks =

French punk rock band

Hatepinks is a French punk rock band originating from Marseille, formed in 2004. Their lyrics are based on a literal translation from French to English (or other languages) and their songs are very short, lasting between a few tens of seconds and two minutes.

== Discography ==
- Plastic Bag Ambitions (2005)
- Complete Recordings 2003-2005 (2006)
- Tete Malade (Sick in the Head) (2007)
