= Wretched Ones =

American punk band

The Wretched Ones are an American punk band from Midland Park, New Jersey, United States. They had formerly belonged to The Burnt and The Wretched. Early in the 1990s, their song "Oi! Rodgers" had a modest underground success.

The band's self-titled debut studio album was released in 1993, receiving a four-star rating from AllMusic.

== Discography ==
=== Albums ===
Title	Label	Other information
The Wretched Ones	Headache Records	re-issued by Knockout Records
Go To Work	Headache Records	re-issued by Knockout Records
We Don't Belong to Nobody	Headache Records	re-issued by Knockout Records
Less Is More	TKO Records	collection of early singles and rare tracks
Make It Happen	Headache Records	re-issued by New Studio Recording (picture LP)

=== EPs ===
Title	Label	Other information
Old, Loud, & Snotty	Headache Records	first release
Going Down the Bar	Headache Records	originally released as a 6-inch EP; re-issued by Dionysus Records with a bonus track
America's Most Wanted	Headache Records	
Johnny Burnout	Force Majeure Records	
Sideburns and Beer	Headache Records	
Nice Guys Finish Last	Black Hole Records	
Hey Old Man	Pogostick Records	
Wretched Ones/No Empathy split	Suburban Voice Records	released with Suburban Voice fanzine
Tributes Suck	Headache Records	featuring four cover songs
Live in Germany	Headache Records	
Live on a Five	Headache Records	

=== Compilations ===
Title	Label	Other information
Punk For Life	Run and Hide Records	Also appearing on this comp are MDC and The Piss Shivers
Punk Dwellings Vol. 1	Dwell Records, 1996	Features "I Hated School," and a cover of "Lipstick On Your Collar."
Liverache - Tales From The Livers Edge	Very Small Records, 1997	Also appearing on this comp are Less Than Jake and The Piss Shivers
