= The Krays (band) =

New York punk band

- Origin: Brooklyn, New York, U.S.
- Genres: Punk, street punk
- Years active: 1994–present
- Labels: TKO Records, Deadcity
- Members: Johnny Kray; AlbeeDamned; Spencer Kray; Rob Kray; Chris Arabic; Kenny

The Krays are an American street punk band from Brooklyn, New York, who formed in 1994. John writes all the lyrics.

The Krays played one of the last shows at CBGB in New York City. John was a member of The Devotchkas, NY Rel-X, and Roger Miret and the Disasters, played bass for The Casualties for a couple years and started his music career in Counter Action with Bashir Scott, Eric Axel and YouTuber, Louis Torres.

== Discography ==
- 1998: Inside Warfare
- 2000: A Battle for the Truth
- 2002: A Time for Action (TKO Records)
- 2011: Sangre
- 2025: The Life We Chose
