= Those Unknown =

American punk rock band

- Origin: Montague, New Jersey
- Genres: Punk Rock
- Years active: 1989–present
- Members: Bill Owens (vocals/guitar) Mike Wesolowski (bass) Jason Danty (drums)
- Website: thoseunknown.com

Those Unknown are an American left-wing punk rock band. With lyrics conveying the grassroots realism of the American working class experience, the band influenced bands such as Dropkick Murphys. Formed in the early 1990s New Jersey Oi! scene, Those Unknown has faced claims by critics that they were communist, in part due to Richard Owens' column in Maximum Rock 'N' Roll.

== Albums ==
- Those Unknown (GMM Records 1995; TKO Records 2003 [reissue w/ bonus tracks])
- Scraps (TKO Records 2003)

== Singles and EPs ==
- The Four of Us (Headache Records 1991)
- Going Strong (Headache Records 1993)
- Distribution (Pogostick Records 1995)
- Malice and Misfortune (TKO Records 2000)

== Compilations ==
- Shreds: Vol. 5, Early 1990s (1997) (Track: Cries of a Nation)
- Punch Drunk Volume 2 (2000) (Track: To the Daunted and the Dispossessed)
- Punch Drunk Volume 3 (2001) (Track: What We're Saying)
- Punch Drunk Volume 4 (2002) (Track: For All Commons)
