= U.S. Bombs =

American punk rock band

- Origin: United States
- Genres: Punk rock; street punk
- Years active: 1993–present
- Label: Slope Records
- Members: Duane Peters
- Past members: Kerry Martinez; Steve Reynolds; Wade Walston; Chip Hanna

U.S. Bombs are an American punk rock band, formed in 1993 in Orange County, California, by Duane Peters and Kerry Martinez. For much of the band's career, the U.S. Bombs consisted of Peters and Martinez, with bass guitarist Steve Reynolds and drummer Chip Hanna. They have also played with Jonny "Two Bags" Wickersham. The U.S. Bombs play '77 style punk, influenced by The Clash, Heartbreakers, Ramones, Flyboys, Chelsea, Stiff Little Fingers, Shane MacGowan & The Popes, Sham 69, the Flys, & the Ruts.

== Biography ==
In 1993, Duane Peters left The Exploding Fuck Dolls and teamed up with Kerry Martinez to start a new band called U.S. Bombs. The band's first release was a double 7-inch called "Scouts of America" released in 1994 on Vinyl Dog Records with Peters on vocals, Martinez on guitar, Steve Reynolds on bass, and Benny Rapp III on drums. Next they released their first full length Put Strength in the Final Blow.

After a few different lineup changes in their early years, they settled into a lineup of Peters, Martinez, and Reynolds, with Chuck Briggs on guitar and Alex Gomez on drums. In 1996, they released their second album Garibaldi Guard! on Alive Records. The next year, they put out an EP called Nevermind the Opened Minds...Here's the U.S. Bombs.

In 1997, due to touring commitments, the rhythm section of the band was replaced with Wade Walston on bass and Chip Hanna on drums. That year, the band released a 10-inch picture disc on Outsider Records. Next they moved to Tim Armstrong's Hellcat Records for a 4-record deal. The first album on Hellcat was War Birth.

Before the band's fourth full-length, The World, guitarist Chuck Briggs died. Briggs was replaced by Jonny "Two Bags" Wickersham. The World was released in 1999.

During this time, the band developed a relationship with Beer City Records/Skateboards and released three 7-inch records with them. In 1997, they released "Outtakes from a Beer City Basement" which had two exclusive songs, "Hot Seat" (an Empire cover) and "Rejected". Next was a split with The Bristles, where the U.S. Bombs did a cover of the Radio Birdman song "Breaks My Heart". The third Beer City release was called "The Great Lakes of Beer" in 2001 and had two exclusive songs, "The Great Lakes of Beer" and "The Critic!".

In 2000, Peters left to start his new band, Duane Peters and the Hunns. After a few releases and some touring, in 2001 he had to return to the studio with the U.S. Bombs as they were still under contract to make 2 more records with Hellcat. They recorded Back at the Laundromat, their fifth full length.

The band appeared on Premium Blend as the stage band during Jim Breuer's hosting stint, and contributed the song "Yer Country" to the soundtrack for Tony Hawk's Pro Skater 4.

In 2006, the U.S. Bombs recorded their 7th full-length album. With Peters, Martinez, Gove, Jaime Reidling and studio bassists, they released We Are The Problem on Sailor's Grave Records.

In March 2015, Peters posted on Instagram, "The Bombs 1993–2013 RIP". In a separate post, he confirmed that the band had broken up.

In the spring of 2017, Peters posted on Instagram that he was going to be getting the U.S. Bombs back together with a completely new crew. The band scheduled a west coast tour for late Summer 2017 including the "It's Not Dead" festival. Peters announced that a new 7-inch of Clash covers was recorded and slated for release on Slope Records in 2017.

Road Case, the band's first album in twelve years, was released on November 23, 2018.

== Members ==
Current

- Duane Peters
- Brandon Meunier
- Philip Barber
- Dave “DB” Barbee

Past

- Kerry Martinez
- Wade Walston
- Chip Hanna
- Jonny "Two Bags" Wickersham
- Curt Gove
- Jamie Reidling
- Miguel Angel Hernandez
- Alex Gomez
- Steve Reynolds
- Chuck Briggs
- Heiko Schrepel
- Jack Dalrymple
- Nate Shaw
- Andy Dahill
- Zander Schloss
- Charley Marshall
- Ace Von Johnson
- Nate Sponsler
- Benny Rapp III
- Steve Davis
- Mikey Jak

== Discography ==
=== Studio albums ===
- Put Strength in the Final Blow (1995, Vinyl Dog Records)
- Garibaldi Guard! (1996, Alive Records)
- Never Mind the Opened Minds (Jan. 1997, Alive Records)
- War Birth (Sept. 1997, Hell-Cat Records)
- The World (June 1999, Hell-Cat Records)
- Put Strength in the Final Blow C.D. (September 1999)
- Back at the Laundromat (March 2001, Hell-Cat Records)
- Covert Action (March 2003, Hell-Cat Records)
- Put Strength in the Final Blow: The Disaster Edition (July 2003, Disaster Records)
- We Are the Problem (April 2006, Sailor's Grave Records; August 2006, Enemy No. 1 Records (Brazil))
- Road Case (November 2018, Slope Records)

=== EPs ===
- Scouts of America (EP) double 7-inch (1994, Vinyl Dog Records)
- U.S. Bombs (EP) (Jan. 1996, Alive Records)
- Jaks/The Way It Ends 10-inch picture disc (Outsider records 1997)
- Outtakes From a Beer City Basement 7-inch (1997, Beer City Records)
- U.S. Bombs/The Bristles split 7-inch (1998, Beer City Records)
- Great Lakes of Beer 7-inch (Beer City Records)
- Hobroken Dreams 7-inch (1999, TKO)
- Tora Tora Tora!/Yer Country 7-inch (TKO records March, 2001)
- Art Kills/Framed 7-inch (TKO records April 2003)
- We Are the Problem/Heartbreak Motel 7-inch (Sailor's Grave Records)
- Death From Above (10-inch picture disc 2013, DIY)
- Clash Tribute 7-inch (2017, Slope Records)
- Hollywood Gong Show 7-inch (2017, Slope Records)

=== Live albums ===
- Lost in America: Live 2001 (Jan. 2002)
- Explosion DVD

=== Compilation albums ===
- Bomb Everything (2003) (Australia Only)
- Generation Kennedy No More (2013, DIY – compilation of demos/outtakes and rare/unreleased tracks)
- Old Skars and Upstarts series of compilations featuring unreleased U.S. Bombs tracks "Check Point Chuck", "Club Slick", "Ghost Soldier" & "He's The Man"
