= Nashville Pussy =

American rock band

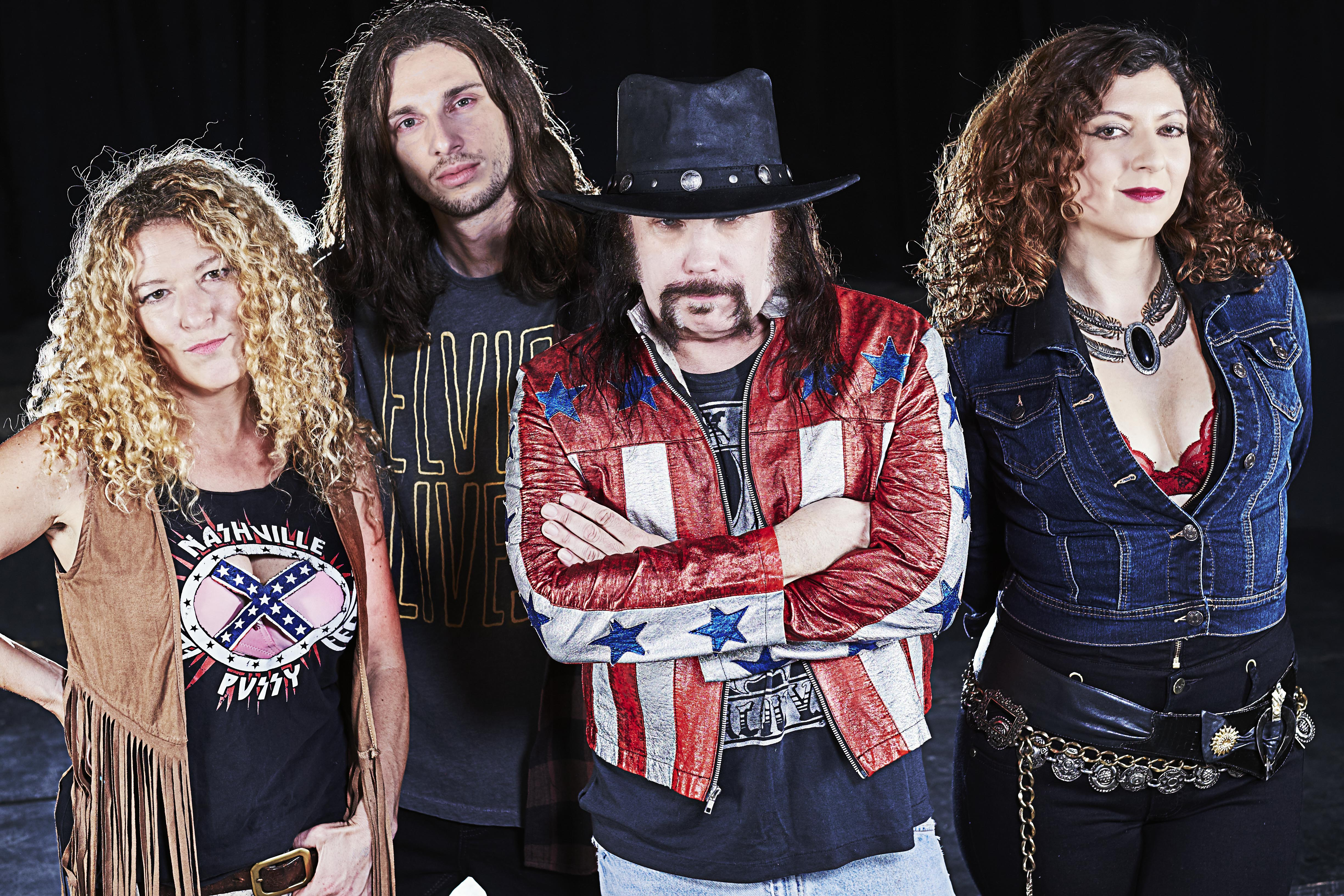
- Nashville Pussy in 2016

Background information
- Origin: Atlanta, Georgia, U.S.
- Genres: Hard rock; southern rock
- Years active: 1996–present
- Labels: earMUSIC; VeryCords; SPV; Amphetamine Reptile
- Members: Blaine Cartwright; Ruyter Suys; Bonnie Buitrago; Dusty Watson
- Website: nashvillepussy.com

Nashville Pussy is an American rock band from Atlanta, Georgia. The band's lyrical themes mostly revolve around sex, drugs, drinking, fighting, and rock 'n' roll. Initially called Hell's Half-Acre, the band's name comes from Ted Nugent's introduction to "Wang Dang Sweet Poontang" on the Double Live Gonzo! album.

Following the initial 1997 breakup of Kentucky cowpunk band Nine Pound Hammer, guitarist Blaine Cartwright formed Nashville Pussy where he would take up vocal duties in addition to guitar. The core lineup of Nashville Pussy consists of husband-and-wife duo Blaine Cartwright and Ruyter Suys (pronounced "Rider Sighs"), and drummer Jeremy Thompson, formerly of Texas band Phantom Creeps. Original drummer Adam Neal (Nine Pound Hammer) left to form the Hookers. Original bassist Corey Parks (sister of former basketball player Cherokee Parks) quit one month after the release of the album High as Hell, and later joined Die' Hunns. Tracy Almazan a.k.a. Tracy Kickass formerly of New York City's The Wives, and Helldorado was enlisted to replace Parks mid-tour.

Nashville Pussy recorded Say Something Nasty with Almazan on bass only to be replaced by Katielynn Campbell (of the band Famous Monsters). Campbell's image is on the album Say Something Nasty. Campbell was subsequently replaced by Karen Cuda for the album Get Some. Karen Cuda also appeared as bassist on the album "From Hell to Texas", and in the live DVD Live in Hollywood.

Nashville Pussy has released seven full-length studio albums, one EP and two live DVDs.

== Influences ==
The band's influences include ZZ Top, Ted Nugent, the Isley Brothers, Betty Davis, Commodores, Funkadelic, Chuck Berry, Ramones and New York Dolls.

== Following ==
The band has remained largely underground, but has been gaining a large cult following in the rock club scene, and in Europe, Australia, Japan, France, and the rest of the world. Grassroots promotion of the band has been aided by their taper-friendly show recording policy. Ruyter Suys was recently voted One of the Greatest Female Electric Guitarists in ELLE magazine. Nine Pound Hammer has since reunited and plays the introduction song for the Adult Swim cartoon 12 oz. Mouse. Cartwright also had a cameo in the Mr. Show spinoff movie Run Ronnie Run! as Duke's Bar Owner. The band also played themselves in the Dutch film Wilde Mossels ('Wild Mussels').

Nashville Pussy received a Best Metal Performance Grammy nomination for their song "Fried Chicken and Coffee" from their debut release, Let Them Eat Pussy (1998, The Enclave) 1999 Grammy. Between April 2 to May 7, 1999, the band toured as the opening act for the North American leg of Marilyn Manson's Rock Is Dead Tour. Their songs "Come On, Come On" and "Hate & Whisky" were featured in the video game Jackass: The Game. Additionally, "Snake Eyes" was for the end credits in the video game Rogue Trip: Vacation 2012 and both "Shoot First and Run Like Hell" and "Wrong Side of a Gun" were in the movie Super Troopers. The song "DRIVE" with its Gary Glitter style drum beat was featured in the episode "Watching Too Much Television" of the HBO series The Sopranos. HBO's Entourage also featured Nashville Pussy's "Hell Ain't What It Used to Be" in the episode "A Day in the Valley". In 2012, Ruyter Suys has also played guitar and toured for Atlanta comedy metal band Dick Delicious and the Tasty Testicles.

== Lineup ==
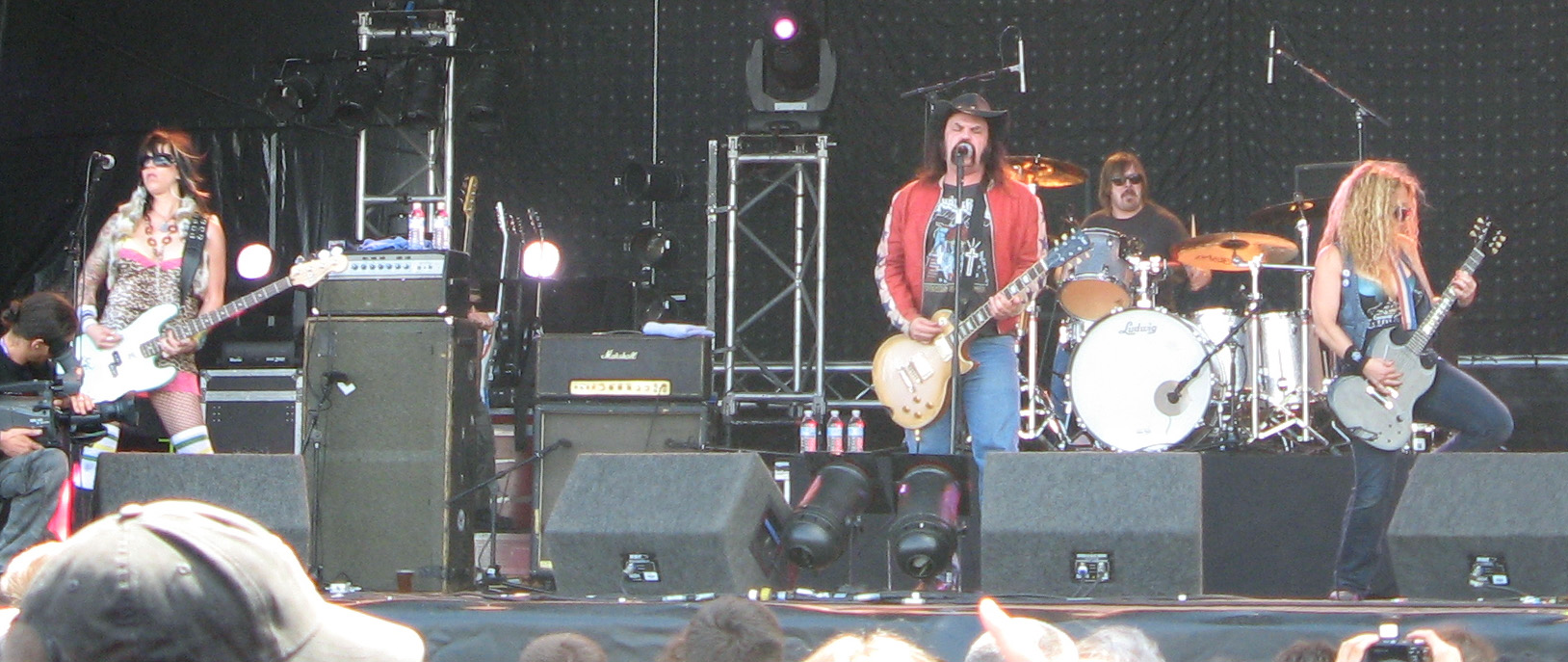
The band performing at Hellfest 2009

=== Current members ===
- Blaine Cartwright – vocals, rhythm guitar
- Ruyter Suys – lead guitar
- Bonnie Buitrago – bass
- Dusty Watson – drums

=== Former members ===
- Adam Neal (a.k.a. The Rock N Roll Outlaw) – drums
- Corey Parks – bass
- Max Terasauro – drums
- Tracy Almazan (a.k.a. Tracy Wives, Tracy Kickass) – bass
- Katielyn Campbell – bass
- Karen Cuda – bass
- Jeremy "Remo" Thompson – drums
- RL Hulsman – drums
- Ben Thomas – drums

== Discography ==
=== Studio albums ===
- 1998: Let Them Eat Pussy
- 1998: Eat More Pussy EP
- 2000: High as Hell
- 2002: Say Something Nasty
- 2005: Get Some!
- 2009: From Hell to Texas
- 2014: Up the Dosage
- 2018: Pleased to Eat You

=== Live albums ===
- 2003: Keep on f*cking Live in Paris (DVD)
- 2008: Live in Hollywood (DVD)
- 2011: Live in Rennes
- 2012: Live and Loud from Europe (CD bonus from "From Hell to Texas – Reissued")
- 2015: Live in Nothingham (Cd bonus "10 Years Of Pussy")
- 2020: Eaten Alive

=== Singles ===
- "Come On, Come On" from the album Get Some! (2005)
- "Hate and Whisky" from the album Get Some! (2005)
- "From Hell to Texas" from the album From Hell to Texas (2009)
- "Drunk Driving Man" from the album From Hell to Texas (2009)
- "Why, Why, Why" from the album From Hell to Texas (2009)
