= The Templars (band) =

American punk band

- Also known as: Lords of the Sword
- Origin: Long Island, New York
- Genres: Oi!
- Years active: 1991–present
- Label: Various
- Members: Carl Fritscher (guitar & vocals), Phil Rigaud (drums), Perry Hardy (bass), Chris White (guitar)
- Past members: Don Gurle (bass & vocals), Chet Knight (guitar), Matt Katz (bass)

The Templars are an Oi! band formed in Long Island, New York in April 1991. The band's musical influences include Oi!, punk rock, glam rock and rock and roll. They have tended to purposely use low-quality recording techniques (their Acre Studios is a garage).

The band recognizes Perry Hardy as their full-time bassist and Chris White as full-time guitarist, even though they do not play on the albums (with the exception of Hardy on two albums). The band currently uses a lineup of four musicians for concerts, with a second guitar player, but still usually records as only a two-piece (with Carl Fritscher playing all bass and guitar parts, as well as vocals with Phil Rigaud on drums).

The band's name comes from an ancient order of Christian militants called the Knights Templar. Their focus on Middle Ages history is largely informed by Carl Fritscher (singer/guitarist) and Phil Rigaud's (drummer) studies and interests. A Templars album cover was displayed in a History Channel documentary about the Knights Templar. The narrator states that the legacy of the medieval organization has influenced varied aspects of modern society, including as film, literature and "hardcore punk music."

== Partial discography ==
=== Albums ===
- The Return of Jacques DeMolay - 1994 - Dim Records
- Phase II - 1997 - Dim Records Germany/Vulture Rock
- Omne Datum Optimum - 1999 - GMM Records
- Horns of Hattin - 2001 - GMM Records
- Outremer 2005 - GMM Records
- Deus Vult - 2017 - Pirates Press Records

There is also a compilation LP of their earliest recorded material entitled "'Pure Brickwall Recordings' 6/92-8/92 and demos early 1993. First 4 track tapes!" which is labeled as being released by Vulture Rock and When Typhoid Courtney Drops, a possible subsidiary of Vulture Rock.

=== Split 12"s ===
- Super Yobs Showdown (split with Red Alert) - 1994 - Vulture Rock
- split with The Glory Stompers - 1996 - Knockout Records

=== 7"s ===
- The Poor Knights of Acre - 1993 - Sonic Aggression
- Clockwork Orange Horrorshow (double 7") - 1995 - Vulture Rock
- La noche de las gaviotas(sic) (aka Night of the Seagulls) - 1997 - Headache Records
- Milites Templi - 2000 - TKO/Templecombe
- The French Connection - 2004 - Bords de Seine
- Out of the Darkness - 2008 - TKO/Templecombe

=== EPs ===
- Beauséant (mini CD)- 1994 - Dim Records
- 1118-1312 (CD/10" mini-LP) - 1997 - Do A Runner/Go-Kart
- I.S.P. Connection (with Stomper 98 and Vortex) - DSS/Cargo

=== Split 7"s ===
- Powerfist (split with Oxblood) - 1994 - Vulture Rock
- split with 90 Proof - 1996 - 90 Proof Records
- split with Bottom of the Barrel - 1997 - Oink! Records
- split with Lower Class Brats - 1997 - TKO Records
- split with Wodnes Thegnas - Haunted Town Records
- split with Gundog - 1999 - New Blood
- Ivano + The Templars - 1999 - Durango 95/Pinhead Generation
- We Stick Together (split with Stomper 98) -1999 - DSS Records
- split with P38 -2000 - Disagree Records
- split with Devilskins - 2001 - Oi!Strike
- Battle for the Airwaves Vol 2 (split with Workin Stiffs, The Bodies, The Wretched Ones) - 200? -Radio Records
- split with Crashed Out - 2005 - TKO/Templecombe
- split with The New Chords - 2010 - Randale Records
- split with The Cliche's - 2011 - Randale/Templecombe

=== Compilation Appearances ===
- Anti-Disco League - Templecombe/TKO
- Oi! It's a World Invasion! Vol. 1 - Step 1/Bronco Bullfrog
- Oi! This is Dynamite! - Step 1/Bronco Bullfrog
- Step on a Crack - Sound Views/Go-Kart
- Oi! It's a World Invasion! Vol. 2 - Step 1/Bronco Bullfrog
- Oi! The Gathering - Sta-Prest
- Backstreets of American Oi! - Sta-Prest
- Oi Against Racism - Havin' A Laugh
- Super Yobs Showdown Vol. 1 - Vulture Rock
- US of Oi Vol. 2 - GMM
- Urban Soldiers: Tribute to the Oppressed - DSS/Longshot
- Angry Punk For Urban Skunx - 45 Revolutions
- Skins N Pinz - GMM
- Skins N Pinz Vol. 2 - GMM

Many exclusive tracks on 7"s or compilations have been later compiled on CD (such as Milites Templi) and certain releases have been reissued on different labels and/or formats (such as Clockwork Orange Horrorshow).
