= Duane Peters =

American singer-songwriter

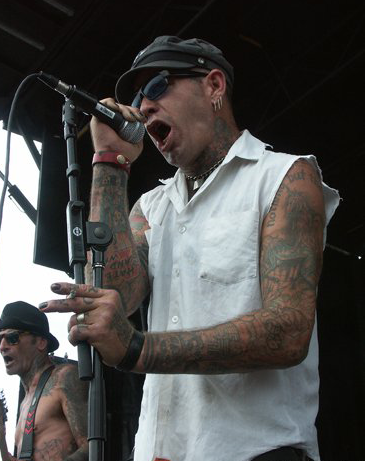
- Duane Peters and The Hunns on stage at The Warped Tour

Background information
- Born: June 12, 1961 (age 65); Orange County, California, U.S.
- Genres: Punk rock
- Occupations: Musician; songwriter
- Instrument: Vocals
- Years active: 1978–present

Duane Thomas Peters (born June 12, 1961) is a punk rock singer/songwriter and professional skateboarder. Active since 1975, he is probably best known as the singer in the California punk rock band U.S. Bombs, which formed in 1993.

== Biography ==
Peters is credited with inventing many tricks, such as the "acid drop" into a pool/bowl, the "layback grind", the "Indy air", the "Sweeper", the "backside layback grind revert", the "fakie hang-up" (a.k.a. "Disaster"), the "invert revert", the "fakie thruster", and the "loop of death", a full 360-degree rotation in a specially designed loop. He also, along with Neil Blender, helped to evolve the footplant into the more dynamic fastplant.

Peters was named Transworld Skateboarding's "Legend" in 2003. He is a professional skateboarder who rides for Pocket Pistols Skates. In May 2005, Black Label Skateboards released a biographic film, entitled Who Cares: The Duane Peters Story. A second documentary, planned by HavocTV, and intended to focus on the supposed path to sobriety of Peters girlfriend Corey Parks, was publicized but failed to appear. In 2006, a sober Peters had a cameo in the Joan Jett video "Androgynous", directed by Morgan Higby Night.

Along with skateboarding, Peters is a well-known punk rock singer. He has formed bands such as the US Bombs, Political Crap, Die' Hunns (also known as Duane Peters and The Hunns), Duane Peters Gunfight, and Exploding Fuckdolls. He was formerly connected with two defunct record labels: Disaster Records, (owned by Patrick Boissel of Alive Records), and – later – Indian Recordings (owned by Ponk Media).

In 2000, Peters formed Duane Peters and The Hunns with Rob Milucky (previously of The Grabbers and The Pushers). Within two years, the band released three albums and undertook both national and European tours. At a The Damned show in 2002, Peters met Corey Parks, who had just left her previous band, Nashville Pussy. Parks joined Duane Peters and the Hunns on bass guitar and soon the band changed their name to Die Hunns. Die Hunns recorded a fourth album entitled Long Legs, Die' Hunns, and embarked on another tour.

== Personal life ==
Peters' 20-year-old son, Chelsea "Chess" Peters, was killed in a car accident on July 6, 2007.

In February 2014, Peters was charged with assaulting his girlfriend at their home in Long Beach, California. He was sentenced to five years probation after pleading guilty to the charge, and also ordered to attend a domestic violence counseling program, 60 days of community serviced and to stay away from the victim for 10 years.

== Discography ==
=== Political Crap ===
- Appearance on Who Cares compilation LP
- Slow Death 7"

=== Exploding Fuck Dolls ===
- American Bomb 7"
- Crack the Safe LP
- 2012 Double CD Vinyl Dog Singles & Live '93 @ KUCI

=== U.S. Bombs ===
- Scouts of America double 7"
- Put Strength in the Final Blow LP
- U.S. Bombs EP
- Garibaldi Guard! LP
- Nevermind the Opened Minds EP
- "Outtakes from a Beer City Basement" 7"
- Jaks 10" picture disc
- War Birth LP
- "Split w/ The Bristles" 7"
- The Great Lakes of Beer 7"
- "Hobroken Dreams" 7"
- The World LP
- 2001/Lost in America Live LP
- "Tora Tora Tora" 7"
- Back at the Laundromat LP
- "Art Kills" 7"
- Covert Action LP
- Bomb Everything DVD
- Put Strength in the Final Blow: Disaster Edition CD
- "We are the Problem" 7"
- We are the Problem LP
- Death From Above 10" picture disc
- Generation Kennedy No More CD

=== Die Hunns ===
- "Not Gonna Pay" 7"
- Unite LP
- Tickets to Heaven LP
- Split with The Revolvers EP
- Wayward Bantams LP
- "Wild" 7"
- Long Legs LP
- "Time Has Come Today" 7"
- "Marshall Law" 7" Split with Radio One
- You Rot Me LP
- Live Fast... Die Hunns LP
- Live In Chi-Town DVD (Ambervillain Films)

=== Duane Peters Gunfight ===
- "Hell Mary"/"Gunfighter" 7"
- Duane Peters Gunfight LP
- Split w/ GG Allin 7" (2 different versions, US and UK)
- Forever Chess 7"
- Checkmate LP

=== The Great Unwashed ===
- Beautiful Tragedy LP

== Contest history ==
- 1st in 1981 Skate City Whittier Pro-Am: vert.

== Bibliography ==
- Brooke, Michael (1999). Concrete Wave: The History Of Skateboarding. ISBN 1-894020-54-5.
