= Oxymoron (band) =

German punk rock band

- Origin: Germany
- Genres: Oi!, street punk, punk rock
- Years active: 1992 - 2002, 2006
- Labels: Knock Out; Cyclone; GMM
- Members: Martin; Björn; Morpheus; Sucker
- Past members: Davey Quinn guitar us tour

Oxymoron was a German punk rock band formed in 1992. The band was founded by Sucker (vocals) and his cousin Björn (drums), along with two friends, Martin (guitar) and Filzlaus (bass).

== Career ==
Originating from Germany, their first real public performance was at an annual punk rock festival in their hometown, along with other local bands. After the show, they were offered several slots as support acts for more established bands all over the world.

In May 1994, they released their debut EP, Beware, Poisonous! on their own Oxyfactory Records label. The EP was soon reissued by Helen of Oi! Records in October of that year, which led to a full-length album deal. While recording Fuck The Nineties—Here’s Our Noize, bassist Filzlaus left the band, and was eventually replaced by a friend, Arne. Helen of Oi! Records originally released the album on vinyl in May 1995, and re-released it on CD in the United States in February 1996.

Following the release of Fuck The Nineties—Here’s Our Noize, which received great underground reviews, Oxymoron began to tour across Germany as well as in Europe. The band released a split EP with English band Braindance, entitled Mohican Melodies in September 1995. Oxymoron released the Crisis Identity EP in March 1996 on Arne's short-lived Rough Beat Records label, and the band appeared on Helen Of Oi!’s Streetpunk Worldwide compilation EP in the same year. They also embarked on their first US tour, along the east coast with Braindance and The Casualties. Also in 1996, Oxymoron made the jump to the German Knock-Out Records label, which released the band's second full-length, The Pack Is Back, in April 1997. The release was followed by more touring in Europe, as well as a three-week summer tour in Japan with The Discocks. Oxymoron established themselves well in the American and German punk scene as an anti-racist streetpunk band.

In 1998, several tours were cancelled, Sucker had to be hospitalized for nerve damage, and Arne decided to leave the band just weeks before they were to head back into the studio. They released a split with Dropkick Murphys titled Irish Stout vs. German Lager. Chrissy, who temporarily had been a second guitarist and had played bass on the first US tour, stepped in on bass. March 1999 saw the release of the mini-album, Westworld, and was followed by more touring of Europe as well as a seven-week coast-to-coast US tour with Dropkick Murphys and The Ducky Boys. Chrissy left the band after the tour and was quickly replaced by Morpheus.

In October 2000, Oxymoron released a compilation album, Best Before 2000, which included all previous 7” singles, along with tracks from previous compilations. November 2001 marked the release of the Savage Output EP, which included three tracks from their upcoming full-length along and one unreleased track. Their third full-length album, Feed The Breed was also released in November 2001, and was followed by a six-week coast-to-coast US tour, as well as a European/German tour.

Martin, decided to leave the band, which led to Chrissy stepping in on guitar. They eventually found a replacement guitarist, but he left in the middle of the 2002 US tour. The band's driver, Davey, filled the void for the remainder of the tour, and also on the following European tour.

=== Hiatus ===
While not announcing an official breakup, Oxymoron has been on an indefinite hiatus since 2002, when Oxymoron announced: "In the near future you won't hear much from us. Oxymoron will have a break for a while! We'll let you know what's going on here, but first of all we definitely [need to] take some time off with the band." In 2005 they reported that "the band is still on ice." 2006 saw the release of somewhat new material in the Noize Overdose split EP with Bonecrusher. The EP contained previously unreleased tracks, along with live footage from a 1999 Hamburg, Germany concert. 2006 also marked the release of the first album of Sucker's solo project, Bad Co. Project, entitled Sucker Stories.

=== Breakup ===
As of 2014, Oxymoron officially disbanded; their website being no longer active with a message simply stating, "Sorry u guys out there, Oxymoron doesn't exist anymore - it's up to you to keep the spirit alive!"

== Discography ==
=== Albums ===
- 1995: Fuck The Nineties: Here's Our Noize
- 1997: The Pack Is Back
- 1999: Westworld
- 1999: Best Before 2000
- 2001: Feed The Breed

=== EPs ===
- 1994: Beware, Poisonous!
- 1996: Crisis Identity
- 2001: Savage Output

=== Splits and compilations ===
- 1995: Mohican Melodies: split with Braindance
- 1996: Streetpunk Worldwide: split with The Discocks, Bottom Of The Barrel and Braindance
- 1998: A Tribute To Cock Sparrer: split with Dropkick Murphys, Shock Troops and Disgusteens
- 1998: Skins 'n' Pins: compilation
- 1998: Irish Stout vs. German Lager: split with Dropkick Murphys
- 2000: Worldwide Tribute To The Real Oi!: compilation
- 2001: Taisho vs. Oxymoron: split with Taisho
- 2006: Noize Overdose: split with Bonecrusher

=== Solo projects ===
- 2006: "Sucker Stories": Bad Co. Project (Sucker's solo project)
- 2011: "Mission Mohawk": Bad Co. Project (Sucker's solo project)

== Members ==
=== Current members ===
- Sucker: Vocals (1992–Present)
- Martin: Guitar (2002–Present)
- Björn: Drums (1992–Present)
- Morpheus: Bass (1999–Present)

=== Former members ===
- Filzlaus: Bass (1992–1994)
- Martin: Guitar (1992–2001)
- Arne: Bass (1995–1998)
- Chrissy: Bass (1996 US Tour, 1998–1999)
- Chrissy: Guitar (2001)
- Unknown Member: Guitar (Played for part of 2002 US Tour)
- Davey: Guitar (2002)
