= Gordy Carbone =

Gordy Carbone, also known as Gordon Carbone and Gordy Forgotten, is an American entertainer from California. He plays in the punk bands The Forgotten and Lars Frederiksen & the Bastards.

He also has an online cooking show called Eat Me!, and has appeared on the Food Network grilling with Iron Chef Bobby Flay on Grill It! with Bobby Flay.

Carbone was a show host for XM Satellite for several years, co-hosting Rancid Radio with Rancid's Lars Frederiksen.
