= Gábor Szakácsi =

American rock musician

Gabor Hun Szakácsi
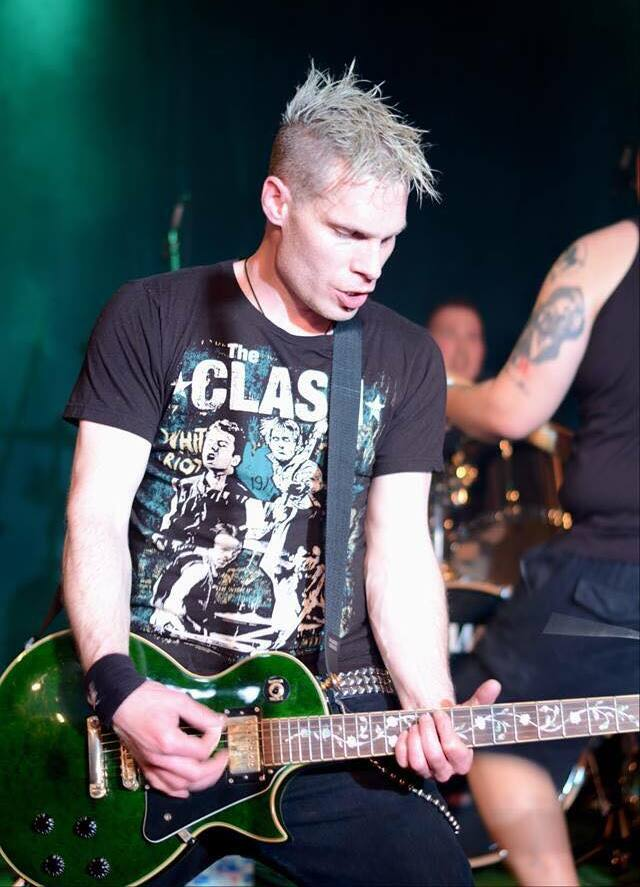
- Szakácsi performing in 2015

Background information
- Also known as: Gabi Hun, Greg
- Born: Gábor Gergely Szakácsi; Budapest, Hungary
- Genres: Punk rock
- Occupations: Musician, singer, songwriter, producer
- Instruments: Guitar, vocals
- Years active: 1990–present
- Labels: Rebellion, Sliver, Premier Art, Edge, PIG, New Art Express
- Website: sledgeback.com

Gábor Szakácsi, also known as Gabi Hun or Gabor Hun, is a Hungarian-born American rock guitarist and vocalist, best known as the frontman of Seattle punk group Sledgeback. He fronted C.A.F.B., one of the most influential Hungarian punk bands of the 1990s, with whom he released six full-length albums between 1993 and 2017. After leaving Hungary, Hun started Sledgeback in 2004 and released several albums with the group. His distinct voice became the trademark of Sledgeback.

== Career ==
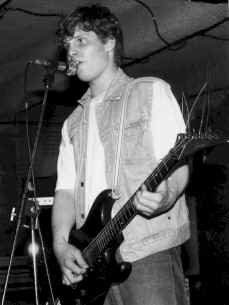
Szakácsi in 1991

Hun rose to fame in Hungary and its surrounding areas with his band C.A.F.B. following the success of their 1997 album "Zanza" which launched the group into the country's mainstream. Despite its success the band was unable to work together due to Gabor Hun's drug related problems. He has left the country after the recording sessions of their 1999 album and formed Sledgeback years later in Seattle. Szakácsi, known for founding the Seattle-based punk rock band Sledgeback, established several new musical projects in the region during the mid-2010s. Most notably, he co-founded the bands Classless Action and The Scoffs, collaborating with musicians from other established local punk rock groups. In the mid-2020s, he also collaborated with the rock band The Hallucinatorz, contributing to their third studio album and appearing in the official music video released for the project.

== Discography ==
=== Sledgeback ===
- 36206 2016
- Land of the freak 2014
- 7 years like a broken record 2012
- 3 of a kind 2012 (Sliver records/New art express) CD
- Bite the bullet 2010 (Sliver records/New art express) CD
- Reality Bites-Sledgeback-Foreign Legion Split 2010 (Sliver records) CD
- Perception Becomes Reality 2007 (Rebellion records) LP, CD
- Perception Becomes Reality 2006 (Sliver records) CD
- People's choice 2004 (Sliver records)
- A scavenger for life 2004 (EP)

==== Compilations ====
- Zombie pit compilation 2011 (PIG Records) CD
- Shut the f*** up and listen IV. 2011 (PIG Records) 7" Vinyl
- We are the underground 2007 (Rebellion records) CD
- Music is stupid. We like noise! 2005 (W.A.G.T.E.Y.) CD
- Punks and pints 3 2007 (Sliver records) CD
- Punks and pints 2 2005 (Sliver records) CD
- Punks and pints 1 2004 (Sliver records) CD

=== The Scoffs (English) ===
- Talk Is Cheap... Here's the Scoffs 2020 (New art express) CD
- Bridge the gap 2021
- The lonely ones 2022

=== Classless action ===
- Unwritten songs 2026 (Capitol hill recordings)

=== Daniela Ferraro project ===
- Not now not ever! 2026

=== C.A.F.B. (Hungarian) ===
- Memorandum 2025 (Capitol hill recordings)
- C.A.F.B. self-titled 2017 (Sliver records) CD
- EP'17 2017 (Sliver records) CD
- Naiv 2004 (Aurora records) CD
- Subkontakt 2001 (Edge records) CD
- Minden-hato 1999 (Edge records) CD
- Zanza, 1997 (Premier art records) CD
- Ne bizz senkiben 1993 (Trottel records)

==== Tapes ====
- Klubbang 1998 (Live recordings and demos)
- Archiv 1992 (Live 1992 Dec.19 with Tankcsapda)
- Utcastilus 1992 (The first release)

==== Compilations ====
- Nem az a punk aki.. 2025 Trottel records (Verious artists)
- Pajtas daloljunk 4. 1993 Trottel records (Various artists)
- Sokk&Roll 1998 (Various artists)
- Let the hammer fall 2001 (Sampler compilation/Metal hammer magazine Hungary-Issue#134)

== Videos ==
- C.A.F.B. - "Engedj be!" video 1997 from Dailymotion
- Sledgeback – "Werewolf Love" video 2006 by Art Reynolds
- Gabor Hun in Punk rock circus with Civet 2006
- Gabor Hun in Punk rock circus trailer 2006
- C.A.F.B. - "Diktátor" (Written by Gabor Szakacsi) 2002

== Notable contributions ==
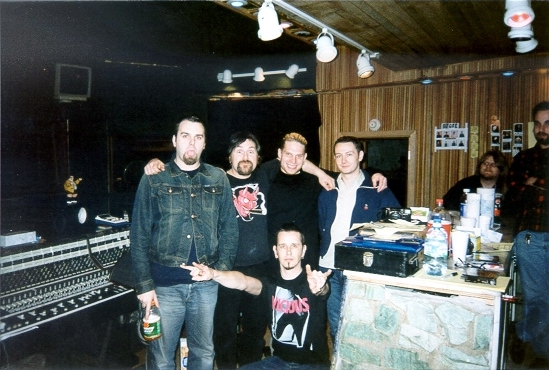
Gábor Szakácsi with Therapy? in Seattle (2001).L-R-Graham Hopkins; Andy Cairns; Gábor Szakácsi; Michael McKeegan.-Front:Martin McCarrick

- At its beginnings Szakácsi was a contributing member of the Hungarian band Brains, which is a successful pop music group today, regularly appearing some of the most prominent festivals of Europe.
- In the spring of 2011 Gabor Hun interviewed Los Angeles punk rock singer Doug Dagger of The Generators and Canadian psychobilly musician Big John Bates (Former member of Annihilator) for the Hungarian music magazine Totalrock. The staff of the magazine opened a full section for Hun, called "vs.Gabihun". Gábor Szakácsi joined Seattle based punk group The Scoffs as guitarist in 2019.

== Equipment ==
Gabor Hun uses

- Soldano Hot Rod 50 amplifier head
- Gibson Les Paul electric guitar
- Fender 100 amplifier head
- Musiclord cabinet
- Ashdown cabinet
- Hohner L-75 guitar with EMG active pickup
- Sennheiser ew 172 G3 wireless system

Hun known for using only 5 strings on the instrument (E.A.D.G.B with no E1).

== Personal life ==
Gábor Szakácsi is the eldest son of the Hungarian film producer Lajos Szakacsi.
