= The Generators =

American punk rock band

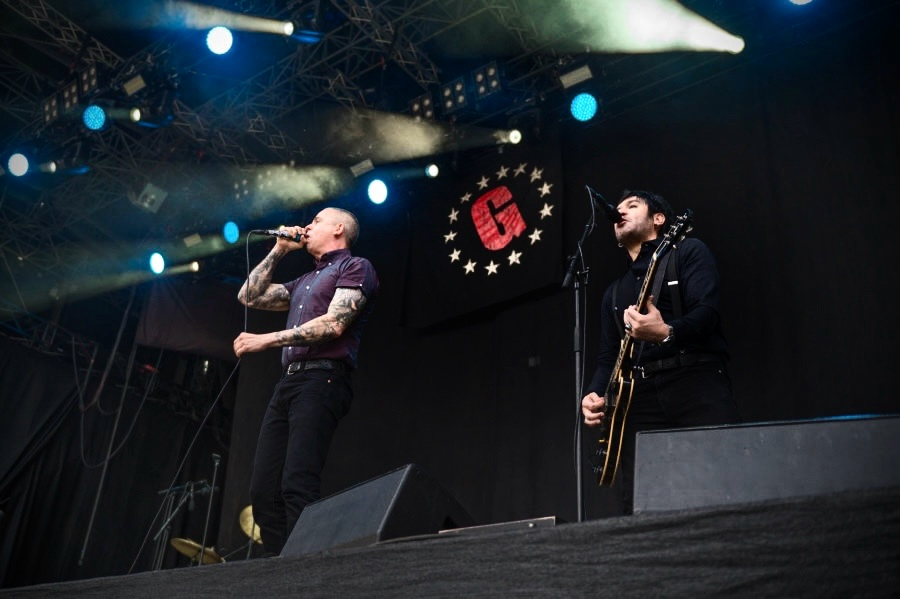
- The Generators performing in Ludwigsburg, Germany, in 2023

Background information
- Genre: Punk rock
- Years active: 1997–2024
- Labels: Triple X Records, DC Jam, People Like You Records, Concrete Jungle, Randale Records, TKO Records
- Past members: Doug Kane; Sir Doosky; Mike Snow; Ted Hahn; Marco Duarte; Steven Reese; Chris Loya; Barry Monroe; Teddy Shrader; Lou Guzman; Johnny Slash "Dirty" Ernie Berru; Don Osterberg; Bryant Ortega; Brandon Lutz; Armando Del Rio; Manny Murders; Ace Von Johnson; Rich Santia; Danny Damned; Sean Romin; Greg Millan
- Website: https://www.the-generators.com/

The Generators were an American punk rock band formed in Los Angeles in 1997. The original line-up consisted of vocalist Doug Dagger (Doug Kane), guitarists Mike Snow and Sir Doosky (Eric Ortega), drummer "Dirty" Ernie Berru, and bassist Rich Richards (Rich Santia).

== History ==
Following the breakup of the 1990s punk rock band Schleprock, The Generators were formed in Los Angeles in 1997.

The Generators released their debut album, Welcome to the End through Los Angeles-based Triple X Records in 1998. In 1999 the band released Ninety Nine, a seven song EP via the German Outcast label. In September 2000, the band released the album Burning Ambition through Urgent Music Ltd. and Tyranny through TKO Records.

During the European leg of the Tyranny tour, Berru and Ortega temporarily left the band. Snow and Kane recruited drummer Mike Clark and began working on a new EP. Ortega rejoined the band before the recording session for the EP State of the Nation, released through TKO Records. In 2002, guitarist Mike Snow left the band, coinciding with the return of Berru as drummer. With Kane and Ortega as primary songwriters, the band released the album Excess, Betrayal... and Our Dearly Departed in 2003, and The Winter of Discontent in 2006. Kane, Ortega, and Ernie remained band members during this period.

Bassist Teddy Hahn and guitarist Ace Von Johnson joined the band prior to the release of The Great Divide in 2006 and remained with the band during their subsequent tour that ended in 2008.

In 2009, Ernie Berru and Teddy Hahn left the band. Derek O'Brien of Social Distortion handled recording duties on the next album while Brandon Lutz replaced Hahn as their bassist. Their next album, Between the Devil and the Deep Blue Sea, was recorded and released via German label company People Like You Records. Following the album's release, the band toured Europe with The Damned. During the tour, Ace Von Johnson left the band following a disagreement with Kane.

In 2010, Ortega left the band for personal reasons, leading to a restructuring of the band's line-up in 2011. It included the return of Mike Snow, former Schleprock guitarist Sean Romin, and drummer Lou Guzman. The band recorded and released their eighth studio album Last of the Pariahs under DC-Jam Records.

In the following years, the band experienced additional line-up changes. Additionally, it released more music including the 2013 six-song EP The Deconstruction of Dreams with Concrete Jungle Records, and the 2014 album Life Gives Life Takes via Randale Records.

In 2014, Kane and Snow formed a side project called Bedlam Knives. A 7-inch record was released through Dr. Strange Records. Ortega, Ernie, and former Generators' bassist Brandon Lutz formed a project called NeuAllies, releasing an EP that same year. Both projects disbanded in 2015.

In 2016, the band returned with the album Earn Your Stripes, released again with Randale Records. The album was followed by a split EP titled Blood, Sweat & Glory with the British band Crashed Out, whom the Generators also toured with. In 2017, The Generators released the single "Street Justice" and announced their upcoming album, Broken Stars & Crooked Stripes. I was set for release in 2018.

During their 2019 hiatus, Kane performed with his 1980s Oi! band, Doug & the Slugz.

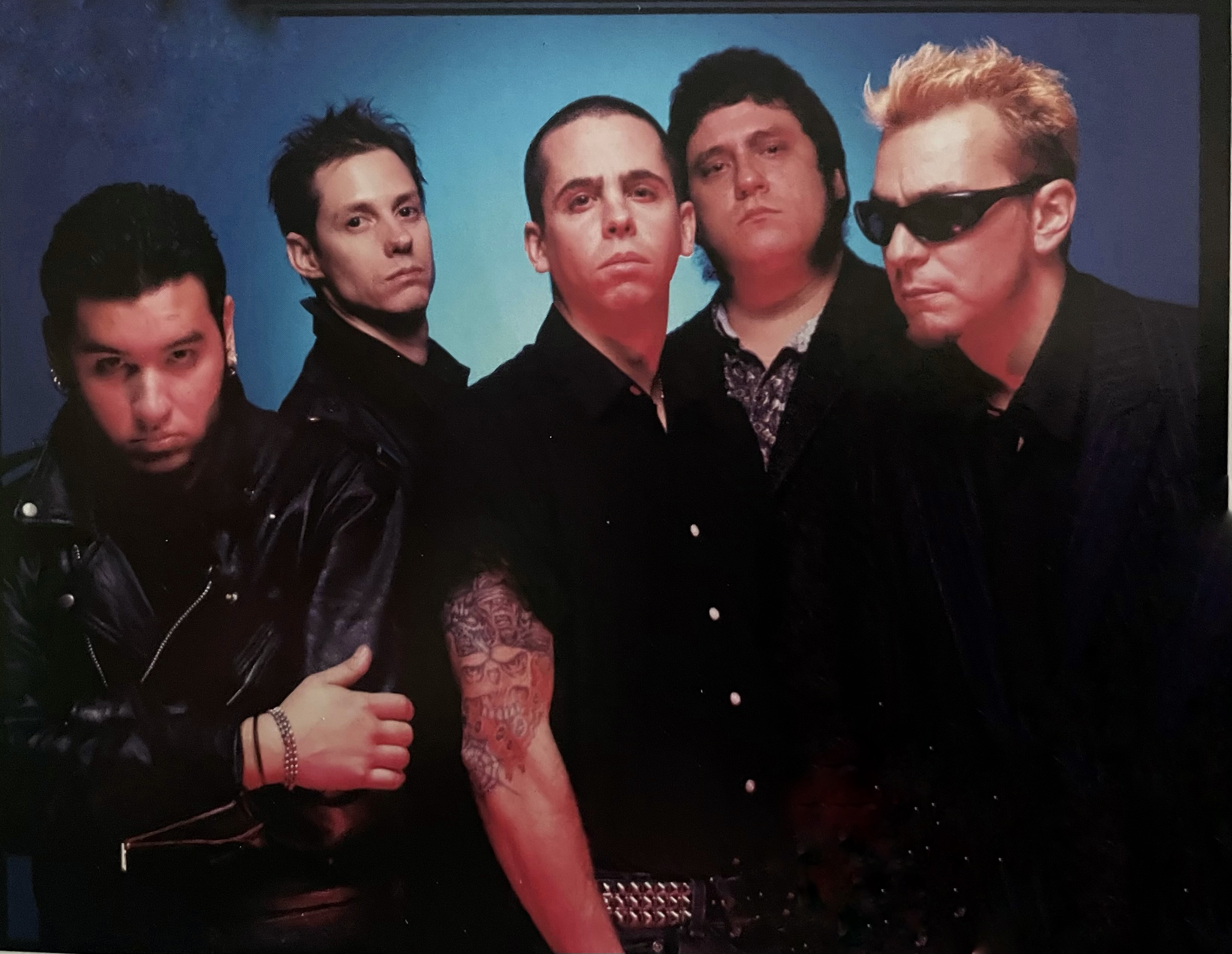
The Generators pictured by Edward Colver in 1997

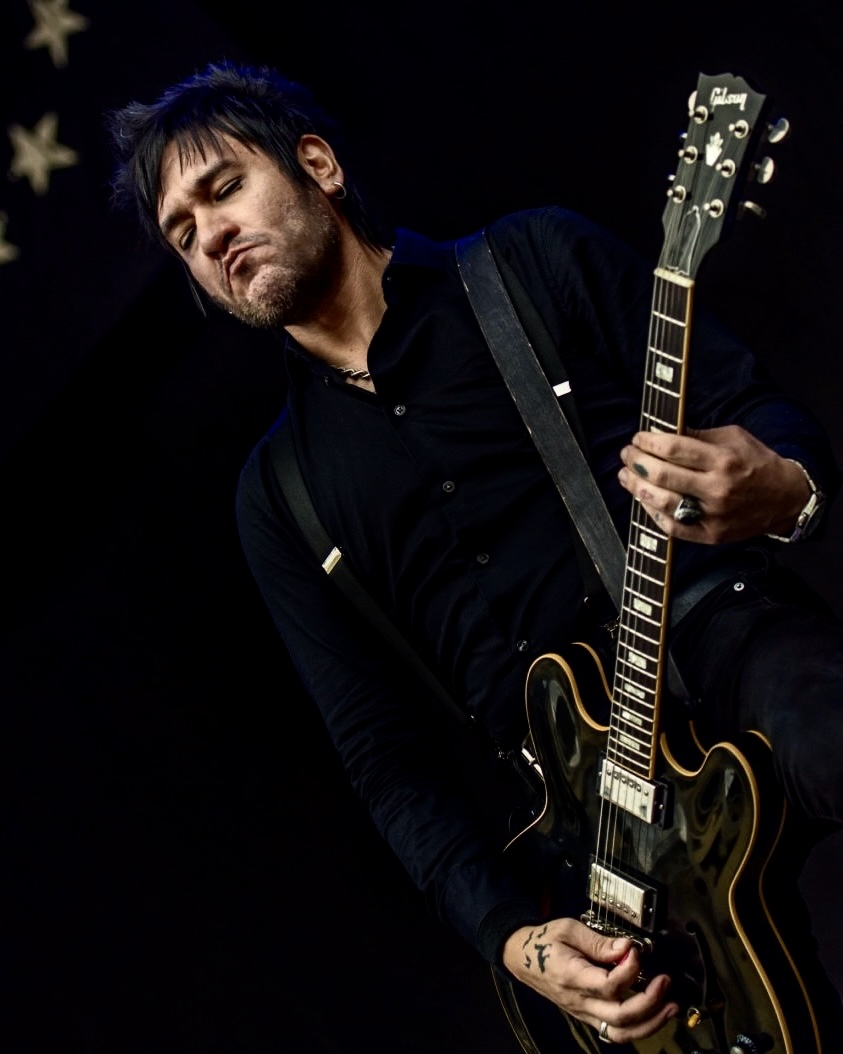
Eric Ortega

== Reunion ==
On September 20, 2022, the band announced a reunion of its original 1997 line-up. It scheduled shows through the end of the year and focusing the set on material from their first three releases.

Following the reunion, Kane, Ortega, and Snow reunited with former member Ted Hahn (bass) and Marco Duarte (drums), who had previously filled in on tours. The line-up appeared at the Punk Rock Bowling Music Festival in Las Vegas in 2023 and undertook a European tour the following summer in 2024.

=== Death of Doug Kane ===
Doug Kane died on May 30, 2024, at the age of 56 from cancer. Shortly before his death, the band decided to permanently disband in his absence.

The band's social media pages are active to this day as an archive for The Generators and Kane's work.

== Discography ==
- Welcome to the End (1998), Triple X Records, US
- Ninety-Nine (1999), Outcast Records/Triple X Records, Europe
- Burning Ambition (2000), Urgent Music Ltd. US/People Like You, Europe & Japan
- Dead at 16 7-inch (2000), TKO Records
- Tyranny (2001), TKO Records US/People Like You, Europe & Japan
- State of the Nation (2001), TKO Records/ Dead Beat, US
- Sounds of the Street Vol. 2: Split CD w/ Vicious Rumors
- From Rust to Ruin (2003), TKO Records (compilation: greatest hits album)
- Riverboat Gamblers split 7-inch"
- Excess, Betrayal...And Our Dearly Departed (2003), People Like You, Europe & Japan, Fiend Music, US
- The Winter of Discontent (2006), People Like You, Europe & Japan, Sailor's Grave, US
- The Great Divide (2007), People Like You, Europe & Japan
- Between the Devil and the Deep Blue Sea (2009), People Like You, Europe & Japan
- You Against You 7-inch (2011), I Hate People Records
- Last of the Pariahs (2011), I Hate People Records, Europe & Japan, DC Jam, US
- 3 of a Kind (2012), Split with Sledgeback and C.A.F.B.
- The Deconstruction of Dreams (2013), Concrete Jungle Records
- Life Gives-Life Takes (2014), Randale Records
- Earn Your Stripes (2016), Randale Records
- Blood, Sweat & Glory (2016), split EP w/ Crashed Out, Randale Records/Longshot Music
- Street Justice (2017), Longshot Music/Randale Records
- Broken Stars & Crooked Stripes (2018), Randale Records

== Filmography ==
- Where the Bad Boys Rock 2004 (Live DVD) (2004), People Like You Records
- Where the Bad Boys Rock 2005 (Live DVD) (2005), People Like You Records
