= Death Patrol =

Death Patrol may refer to:

- Death Patrol, George Low story from Commando (comics)
- Death Patrol, squad from DC Comics imprint Military Comics 1943 Gill Fox
- Death Patrol, 1959 episode of Mackenzie's Raiders with Iron Eyes Cody
- Death Patrol, associated band of Foreign Legion (band)
- "Death Patrol", song by Ariel Pink from Dedicated to Bobby Jameson
