= Guy Lacey =

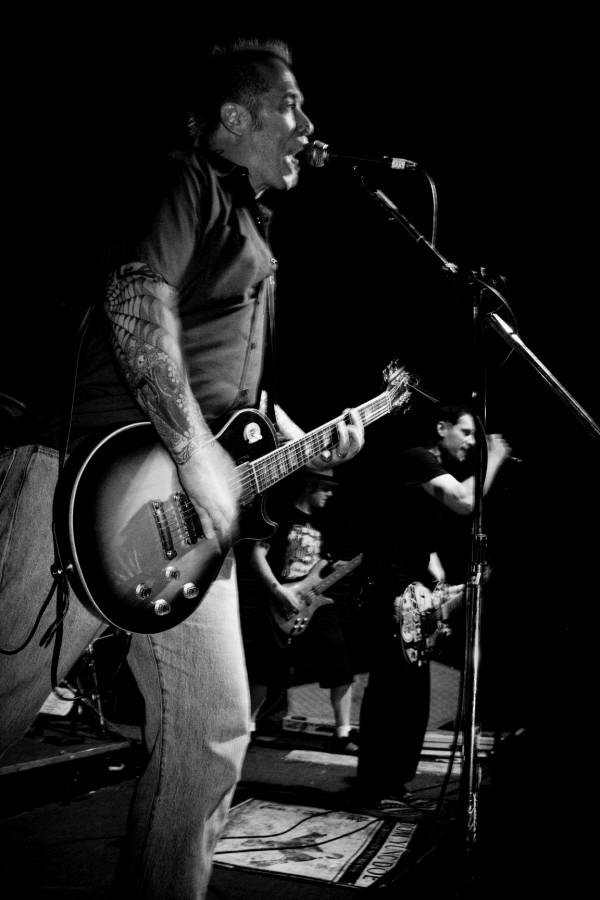
- Lacey with American punk band Sledgeback

Background information
- Birth name: Guy Lacey
- Born: Seattle, Washington, US
- Genres: Grunge, Punk rock
- Occupation(s): Musician, songwriter
- Instrument(s): Guitar, vocals
- Years active: 1989–present
- Labels: Columbia records, Rebellion, Sliver
- Website: www.sledgeback.com

Guy Lacey is an American rock guitarist, singer and songwriter. He is best known for his work with Seattle grunge rock band War Babies in the 1990s and with American punk rock outfit Sledgeback in the 2000s. He recorded the one and only album of War Babies, released on Columbia Records in 1992 including the song "In the Wind" which features in the 1992 film Buffy the Vampire Slayer, the forerunner to the later successful TV series. Lacey joined Sledgeback in 2006. His signature guitar style became an important part of Seattle punk rock stalwarts Sledgeback.

== Discography ==
- War Babies - War Babies (1993)
- Perception Becomes Reality - Sledgeback (2006)
- Reality Bites - Sledgeback (2010)

== Videos ==
- Hang Me Up - War Babies (1992)
- Blue Tomorrow - War Babies (1992)
- Werewolf Love - Sledgeback (2006)

== Music credits ==
- Buffy The Vampire Slayer - "In The Wind" (Guitar)
