= Tim Mullen (drummer) =

American drummer (born 1975)

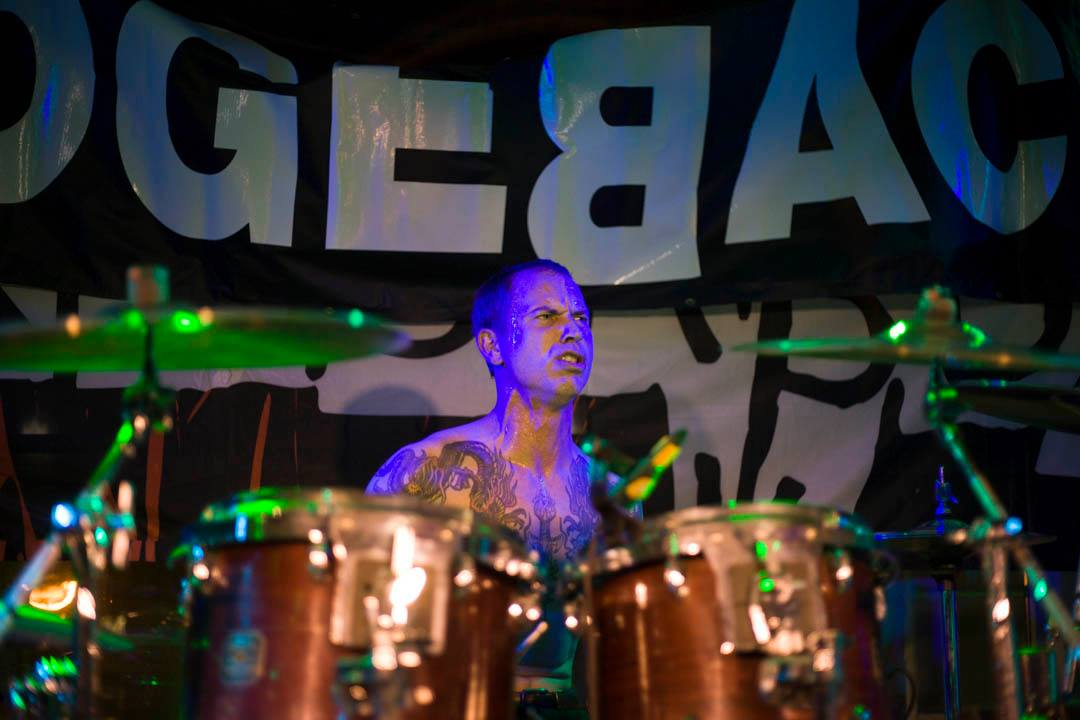
- Mullen with Sledgeback in 2015

Background information
- Birth name: Timothy Mullen
- Born: March 10, 1975 (age 50); Omaha, Nebraska, U.S.
- Genres: Punk rock, metalcore
- Occupation: Drummer
- Years active: 1987–present
- Member of: Sledgeback
- Formerly of: Himsa

Tim Mullen is an American drummer who is a member of the Seattle punk band Sledgeback. He previously was a member of the metalcore band Himsa from 2000 to 2003.

== Career ==
Mullen was a member of Seattle metalcore outfit Himsa. He accomplished several U.S. and European tours as member of the band, supporting acts like Lamb of God, Avenged Sevenfold, AFI, and Hatebreed. He departed Himsa in 2004 and did not play in a notable project until February 2009 when he joined the punk rock band Sledgeback.

== Equipment ==
Mullen uses Gretsch Drums, Zildjian Cymbals, Tama Hardware, Remo Heads, and Promark Sticks.

== Discography ==
- Death Is Infinite – Himsa (2001)
- Courting Tragedy and Disaster – Himsa (2003)
- Reality bites – Sledgeback (2010)
- Bite the bullet – Sledgeback (2010), Sledgeback (album) 3 of a kind (2011), Sledgeback (album) 7 years like a broken record (2011)
