= My Curse =

My Curse may refer to:

- "My Curse" (song), a song by Killswitch Engage
- "My Curse", a song by The Afghan Whigs from Gentlemen
- "My Curse", a song by The Generators from Excess, Betrayal...And Our Dearly Departed
- "My Curse", a song by H2O from H2O
