= CAFB =

CAFB may refer to:

- Canadian Association of Food Banks
- Castle Air Force Base, in California
- Columbus Air Force Base, in Mississippi
- C.A.F.B., influential Hungarian rock group
