= Sledgeback =

American punk rock band

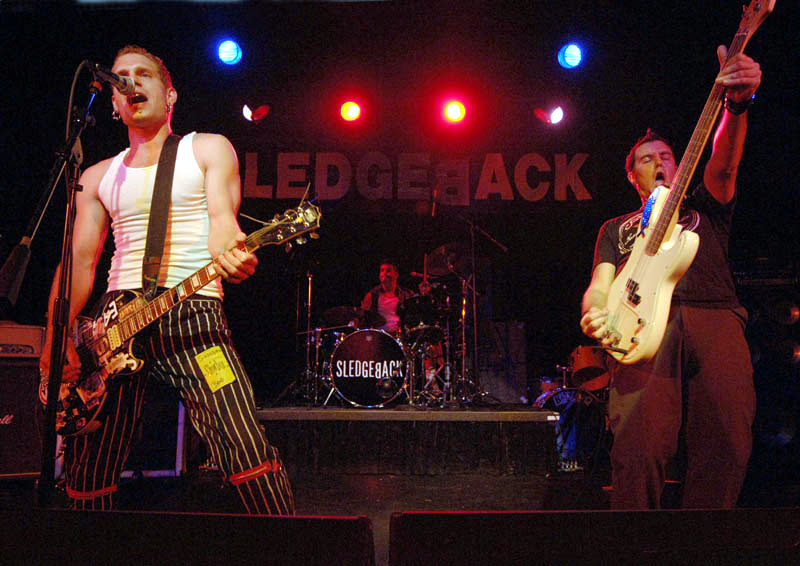
- Sledgeback at the Showbox in Seattle, 2005

Background information
- Origin: Seattle, Washington, U.S.
- Genres: Punk rock, Oi!
- Years active: 2004–present
- Labels: Rebellion Records, Sliver Records
- Members: Gábor Szakácsi; Tim Mullen; Justin McCawley
- Past members: Parker Lundgren; Guy Lacey; Shawn Trotter
- Website: sledgeback.com

Sledgeback (stylized as Sledge𐐒ack) is a Seattle, Washington-based punk rock band, formed in early 2004, with Hungarian-born American guitarist Gábor Szakácsi (Gabi Hun) as the frontman. Former member of the long-standing influential Hungarian punk rock outfit C.A.F.B., Gabi Hun moved to Seattle not knowing a word of English, and soon after formed Sledgeback.

== History ==
=== Beginning 2004–2007 ===
Sledgeback have toured both locally and internationally, playing in 2005's Vans Warped Tour and even opening for Flogging Molly to crowds. With their first album release People's Choice through Sliver Records, Sledgeback gained notoriety through bi-coastal radio play and shows due in large part to high-intensity performances, with life-inspired lyrics.

The band claims on its official website that Sledgeback started as an attempt by Gábor Szakácsi to continue his previous project, C.A.F.B., which is undoubtedly the biggest influence on the group, dating back to 1990. The previous accomplishments of Hun with C.A.F.B. helped build a loyal fanbase for Sledgeback around Hungary and gained attention in various European countries following the release of their second album by Rebellion Records (Holland) in 2007. After months of negotiation to alleviate the agreement between the band and Sliver Records regarding the release of the disputed second album, Perception Becomes Reality, to Rebellion records, Sledgeback departed the label. Rebellion signed Sledgeback and added one of the album's songs, "Wonderland," to the We are the Underground compilation in addition to the release of Perception Becomes Reality. The work was published as compact disc (CD) and vinyl (12") format.

=== Intermission 2008 ===
Due to several member changes Sledgeback remained relatively silent throughout 2008 with only a handful of Seattle area performances, supporting bands such as The Accüsed and the Angry Samoans.

=== Revival 2009–2010 ===
In 2009, former Himsa drummer Tim Mullen joined Sledgeback. After Parker Lundgren guitarist left to play for Queensrÿche, the group continued working on their third album, Bite the Bullet, as a trio. It released by Sliver Records in November 2010 following a 12 track split cd (compact disc) Reality Bites with Welsh punk veterans Foreign Legion. One of the most popular songs of the band ("Pants Off") from their debut album, was used in the soundtrack of the German action-comedy DVD feature OTE by Derik Rentrop in 2010.

=== 2011 and beyond ===
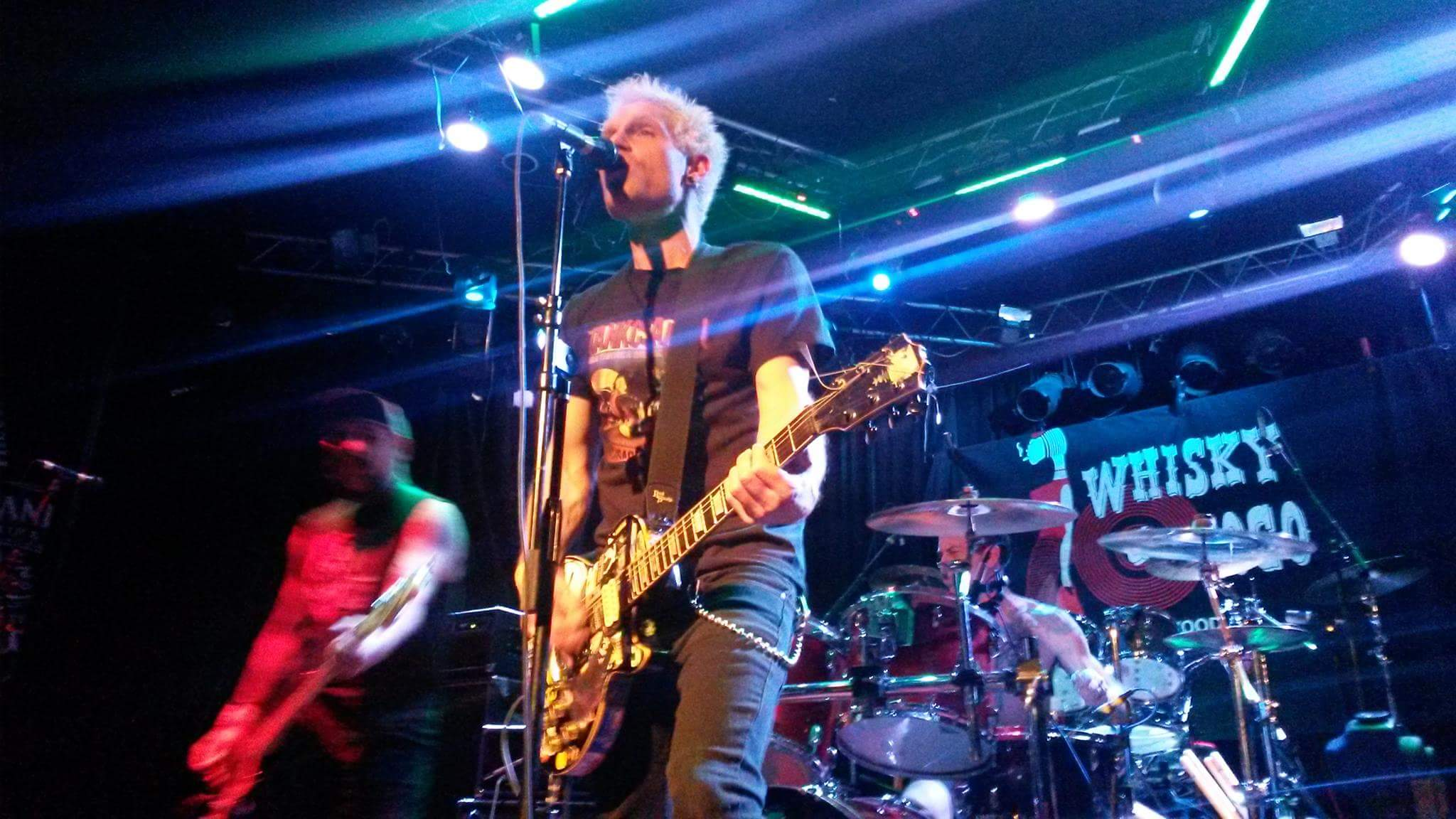
Sledgeback at Whisky a Go Go, Hollywood

Sledgeback appeared on a (vinyl) 7" compilation titled Shut the F*** Up and Listen Vol. IV with a sixty seconds long track, "Oi generation". Released by PIG Records, the disc contains artists including GG Allin and MDC. Following another appearance with a song on the Zombie Pit compilation in 2012, the band released a three-way split 3 of a Kind with Los Angeles punk rockers The Generators and C.A.F.B. The album also served as retrospective take on the band's deeper millennial roots through C.A.F.B., which was credited as the fundamental starting point of Sledgeback, upon Hun's official departure following their 2004 album.

In May 2012, New Music Distribution and the German SN-Punx record label issued the first ever retrospective compilation of Sledgeback with 16 songs. The album, 7 Years Like a Broken Record covered the band's career between 2004 and 2011, including re-mastered and re-recorded versions of some of their previously released songs. Trotter left Sledgeback in mid 2013. He was replaced by Justin McCawley who is also a member of the Seattle punk group The Insurgence.

== Style and sound ==
The sound of Sledgeback originates in the Hungarian front man's vocal style that defines the whole structure of the group with lyrics that often describe painful moments of life taken from Hun's personal experiences. Sledgeback may sound close to its influences but still is easily recognizable, creating a unique mixture of the so-called street punk and Oi! styles with the timeless sound of 1990s west coast punk, and successfully incorporating the vocals of Gábor Szakácsi that sets them aside from other similar bands. Possibly because of the frontman's Central European heritage, Sledgeback's musical style is comparable with bands like the German Böhse Onkelz, The Freeze as well as Pegboy and Gábor Szakácsi's previous group from Hungary, C.A.F.B.

== Roots ==
The roots of Sledgeback can be traced back to Gábor Szakácsi's previous group, C.A.F.B. which was an important part of the 1990s Hungarian punk and alternative music revival. (As it mentioned in the most comprehensive Hungarian music encyclopedia Hun left Hungary and with that his band C.A.F.B. to start a new life in Seattle where he later formed Sledgeback. The musical structure of both bands are the same, with the driving stripped down raw guitar chords. The only difference between the two groups is the keyboard, which was also an essential element of C.A.F.B. in the latter albums, particularly their most successful work, Zanza, which launched the band into the Hungarian mainstream in 1997.

== Current members ==
- Gábor Szakácsi (Gabor Hun) – vocals, guitar
- Tim Mullen – drums
- Justin McCawley – bass

== Discography ==
- People's Choice (2004)
- Perception Becomes Reality (2006)
- Reality Bites – split with Foreign Legion (2010)
- Bite the bullet (2010)
- 3 of a Kind – split with The Generators and C.A.F.B. (2012)
- 7 Years Like a Broken Record (2012)
- Land of the Freak (2014)
- 36206 (2016)

=== Compilations ===
- Punks and Pints – Seattle's Best Punk January 1, 2004
- Music Is Stupid. We Like Noise! January 1, 2005
- Punks and Pints – Seattle's Best Punk – Vol. 2 January 1, 2006
- We Are the Underground 2007 (Rebellion records) 2007
- Punks and Pints Vol. 3 (2007)
- Shut the F*** Up and Listen (Vol. IV) March 2011 (PIG Records)
- Zombie Pit (2011)
- Oi the Print No. 6 (2012)

=== Videos ===
- Sledgeanger – 2004
- Werewolf Love – 2006
- Don't Wanna Know – 2008
- No Feelings – 2014
- Hey Ho – 2011
- Insane – 2014
- I am – 2014
- New World Order – 2014
- Frustration – 2014

=== Movie ===
- OTE (German)
