= Tyranny (The Generators album) =

Tyranny (Album)

Studio album by The Generators
- Released: 2001
- Recorded: 1999/2001
- Genres: Punk rock; alternative rock
- Length: 30:44
- Labels: People Like You Records, TKO Records
- Producer: Rich Mouser

The Generators chronology
Burning Ambition (2000)	Tyranny (Album) (2001)	State of the Nation (2007)

Professional ratings
Review scores
Source	Rating
AllMusic	2.5/5 stars

Tyranny is an album by alternative/punk rock band The Generators, released in 2001.

== Critical reception ==
Exclaim! called the album "a keeper," writing that "melodic elements sneak into songs like 'Coming Down.'"

== Track listing ==
All tracks are written by Doug Dagger; co-writers are noted.

No.	Title	Co-writer(s)	Length
1.	"Down In The City"	Sir Doosky, Mike Snow	3:27
2.	"Murder"	Doosky	2:44
3.	"Keep On Running"	Snow	2:39
4.	"Hijacked"	Doosky	3:08
5.	"Summer Of Unrest"	Snow	2:23
6.	"Tyranny"	Doosky	2:23
7.	"Dead At 16"	Doosky	2:26
8.	"Rats"	Snow	1:42
9.	"Us Against Them"	Doosky	2:24
10.	"All Night Long"	Doosky	1:48
11.	"Suburban Bitch"	Don Osterberg	2:19
12.	"Coming Down"	Doosky	3:21
Total length:			30:44

== Credits ==
- Doug Dagger - vocals
- Sir Doosky - lead and rhythm guitars, backup vocals
- Mike Snow - lead and rhythm guitars, backup vocals
- Dirty Ernie - drums, backup vocals
- Don Osterberg - bass, backup vocals
- Rich Mouser - backup vocals
- Bryant Ortega - bass on "All Night Long" and "Dead At 16"
