= Demob (disambiguation) =

Demob usually refers to demobilization, the standing down of military personnel.

Demob may also refer to:

- Demob (TV series), a British comedy-drama
- Demob (band), a punk rock band (since 1978, in various forms), originating in Gloucester, England

== See also ==
- D Mob, producer of house music (since 1988), from Staffordshire, England
- D-Mob, a video game character in Def Jam Vendetta and Def Jam: Fight for NY
- Demobbed (disambiguation)
