= Perception Becomes Reality =

Studio album by Sledgeback
- Released: June 2006
- Genre: Punk rock
- Label: Sliver records, Rebellion
- Producer: Jay Sinclair, Gabor Hun

Sledgeback chronology
People's Choice (2004)	Perception Becomes Reality (2006)	Bite the Bullet (2010)

Perception Becomes Reality is Sledgeback's second full-length album. The sound of the album is general punk rock.

Originally released in 2006 by Sliver records in the United States, the Dutch label Rebellion Records released a European version of the album on compact disc and vinyl formats in 2007.

== Track listing ==
1. "Werewolf Love" – 2:23
2. "Wrong Place" – 3:35
3. "My Life" – 2:34
4. "Coming Home" – 3:21
5. "Heroes Never Die" – 4:06
6. "Wonderland" – 3:09
7. "Dial 911" – 3:01
8. "Ride of Life" – 2:33
9. "Walk the Road" – 4:10
10. "Love and Hate" – 3:47
11. "Untitled" – 1:52

== Video ==
There was one music video recorded for this album for the song "Werewolf Love" in 2006. The video was directed by Arthur Reynolds.

== On compilations and splits ==
"My life" and "Wonderland" were released on the split album Reality Bites with the UK punk band Foreign Legion in 2010 by Sliver Records. "Wonderland" was also released on the We Are the Underground compilation published by Rebellion Records in 2007. "My Life" was released on "Punks and Pints" compilation (796873053747) by Sliver Records in 2006.
