= People's Choice (album) =

Studio album by Sledgeback
- Released: December 2004
- Genre: Punk rock
- Label: Sliver Records
- Producer: Jay Sinclair, Gabor Hun

Sledgeback chronology
A scavenger for life EP (2004)	People's Choice (2004)	Perception Becomes Reality (2006)

People's Choice is Sledgeback's first full-length album, released in 2004 by Sliver records . The sound of the album is general punk rock.

== Track listing ==
1. "Pants off" - 3:27
2. "Push Me Away" - 2:53
3. "Sledgeanger"3:37
4. "How far" - 3:25
5. "Don't wanna know " - 2:36
6. "Deal" - 0:29
7. "Heat" - 2:59
8. "Good by my friend" - 2:07
9. "Take me home" - 2:19
10. "No feelings" - 2:10
11. "Gimme back" - 3:02
12. "Regret" - 2:57
13. "Seattle" - 2:17

== Other ==
- Track #1 "Pants off" has been recorded with Hungarian language "Utazas" ("Trip") and played live by the band C.A.F.B..
- Track #6 is not a full song.
- Track #13 is instrumental.
- Jay Sinclair is an American Producer, Guitarist
