= Summon in Thunder =

Studio album by Himsa
- Released: September 18, 2007
- Studio: Robert Lang (Shoreline, Washington); Woodshed Studios
- Genre: Metalcore, melodic death metal
- Length: 45:00
- Label: Century Media
- Producer: Devin Townsend (vocals), Steve Carter

Himsa chronology
Hail Horror (2006)	Summon in Thunder (2007)

Professional ratings
Review scores
Source	Rating
About.com	link

Summon in Thunder is Himsa's fourth and last full-length album. It was released September 18, 2007, through Century Media Records. Music videos were made for the songs "Unleash Carnage" and "Big Timber".

== Reception ==
Blabbermouth.net states "The first class recording team... ...harnesses the unit's musical ferocity, emphasizing every detail, right down to vocalist terrorist John Pettibone's paint-peeling delivery. It is in fact an all-consuming sound with an emphasis on the splitting of ears. The shock of the up tick in fury occurring after the first spin is downright destabilizing."

Jason Jordan on the Last Rites website states the album "is a good, thrashy metalcore record that surpasses the band's previous entries, but not by a considerable distance", that "Summon in Thunder is noticeably heavier and more memorable than any disc in their catalog", and "it's also a testament to the fact that this quintet is improving while moving up the metal ladder simultaneously."

== Track listing ==
1. "Reinventing the Noose" – 5:17
2. "Haunter" – 4:17
3. "Big Timber" – 4:00
4. "Given in to the Taking" – 4:02
5. "Skinwalkers" – 6:41
6. "Curseworship" – 4:03
7. "Hooks as Hands" – 4:16
8. "Ruin Them" – 3:33
9. "Den of Infamy" – 4:15
10. "Unleash Carnage" – 2:02
11. "Summon in Thunder" – 3:13
