= State of the Nation (EP) =

State Of The Nation

EP by The Generators
- Released: February 2002
- Recorded: September 2001
- Genre: Punk rock
- Label: Dead Beat Records LP/TKO Records CD
- Producer: The Generators

The Generators chronology
Tyranny (2001)	State Of The Nation (2002)	Excess, Betrayal...And Our Dearly Departed (2003)

The State Of The Nation EP is the second EP by The Generators. It was released in February 2002, on Dead Beat Records on vinyl & TKO Records on CD.

== Track listing ==
All songs by Snow/Dagger except where noted...

1. "Go Away"
2. "Operation Salvation" (Osterberg/Dagger)
3. "Tough As Nails"
4. "Fantastic Disaster"
5. "Here Comes The Plaque"
6. "Kill The President (Voices in His Head)"
7. "Running Riot (Live)" (Cock Sparrer cover)
8. "Hanoi 68 (Live)" (Doosky/Dagger)

== Credits ==
- Doug Dagger – lead vocals
- Sir Doosky – lead & rhythm guitars, back up vocals
- Mike Snow – lead & rhythm guitars, back up vocals
- Don Osterberg – bass & backing vocals
- Mike Clark – drums & backing vocals
