= Fateless (film) =

2005 film

- Hungarian-language poster
- Directed by: Lajos Koltai
- Written by: Imre Kertész
- Produced by: Lajos Koltai; András Hámori; Ildikó Kemény; Jonathan Olsberg; Lajos Szakacsi
- Starring: Marcell Nagy; Áron Dimény; András M. Kecskés; József Gyabronka; Endre Harkányi
- Cinematography: Gyula Pados
- Edited by: Hajnal Sellő
- Music by: Ennio Morricone
- Distributed by: THINKFilm
- Release dates: 8 February 2005 (Hungarian Film Festival); 6 January 2006 (United States)
- Running time: 136 minutes
- Countries: Germany; Hungary; United Kingdom
- Languages: Hungarian; German; English
- Box office: $2,512,009

Fateless (Hungarian: Sorstalanság) is a Hungarian film directed by Lajos Koltai, released in 2005. It is based on the semi-autobiographical novel Fatelessness by the Nobel Prize winner Imre Kertész, who also wrote the screenplay. It tells the story of a teenage boy who is sent to Auschwitz and Buchenwald.

The film's music was composed by Ennio Morricone, and one of its songs was sung by Lisa Gerrard. The film is one of the most expensive ever produced in Hungary, with a cost of $12 million. The film also features British actor Daniel Craig, who plays a cameo as a United States Army sergeant.

The film was screened in Hungary and Germany (at Berlinale), at the Telluride Film Festival in Telluride, Colorado as well as the Toronto International Film Festival.

== Awards and nominations ==
- Nominated – Golden Berlin Bear – Lajos Koltai
- Nominated – European Film Award – Best Cinematographer – Gyula Pados
- Nominated – European Film Award – Best Composer – Ennio Morricone
- Official Selection – Berlin Film Festival 2005
- Official Selection – Telluride Film Festival 2005
- Official Selection – Karlovy Vary International Film Festival
- Gala Presentation – Edinburgh International Film Festival
- Special Presentation – Toronto International Film Festival
- Chicago International Film Festival 2005
- AFI Los Angeles Film Festival 2005
