= Major Accident =

British punk band

- Also known as: Accident
- Origin: Darlington, England
- Genres: Punk rock, Oi!
- Years active: 1977–1985; 1996–2012 2025-present
- Labels: Step Forward; Flicknife; Syndicate; Toxic Shock; We Bite Records; Link Records; Upstart Productions; DSS Records; Captain Oi! Combat Rock; GMM; Dojo Limited
- Members: (Vocals); Paul Larkin (Bass); Con Larkin (Guitar); Ian Timms; Andy Wears (Drums); Andy Lazenby
- Past members: Ritz; David Hammond; Staps; Andy Harding; Evoker; Col Stephenson; Porky Stephenson; Stu Lee; Gary Jones; Rich; Craig; Big G

Major Accident (also known as Accident) is a punk band from the North East of England.

== History ==
=== Early years ===
Major Accident was originally formed in late 1977 in Darlington. Their first studio recording came in the early 1980s, when they recorded a single called Terrorist Gang with the B-side "Self Appointed Hero", and an early version of Massacred Melodies, which the band re-recorded in 1981 – this became their first LP. They planned to release "Warboots" from this session and got as far as test pressings before being signed by Step Forward records, home of Chelsea, Sham 69 and the Cortinas amongst others.

The band released their first single, "Mr Nobody", with Step-Forward Records before the release of their first studio LP. A UK tour supporting Chelsea helped promote the release of the record. They had UK Independent Chart hits with singles "Fight To Win" (no. 24) and "Leaders of Tomorrow" (no. 19, featuring drummer Evo, formerly from The Angelic Upstarts and The Blood who went on to form punk influenced thrash and speed metal NWOBHM band Warfare), followed by "Respectable" (featuring "The Big G" – Garteh Jones on drums) all released on the Flicknife Records label, as was the LP A Clockwork Legion, by which time the band's name had been shortened to "Accident". A live album, Tortured Tunes – the Official Bootleg, was released in 1984, reaching no. 24 on the Uk Independent Chart. Around this time the band appeared on BBC2 playing three songs live. American label Toxic Shock released a follow-up album ...Crazy! in 1985, just before the band split up.

=== 1996–2012 ===
Major Accident re-formed in 1996, once again using the full name rather than just "Accident". The re-formation was accompanied by a new studio album, The Ultimate High, released on We Bite Records, with a seven-inch single, Representation Not Reality, which was released in 1999 on Upstart Productions. The band's final release was a split album with Welsh street punks Foreign Legion entitled Cry Of Legion.

Live performances followed, including a night at New York's CBGB in 2001 with a "clockwork punk" theme. The band's activity was sharply curtailed when drummer Laze was involved in a motorcycle accident. They played their final gig around 2012

2025-present Major Accident makes a return to the live performance scene playing a gig at the forum in Darlington.

== Clockwork punks ==
Major Accident popularised a punk style of dress based on the costumes worn in the 1971 film A Clockwork Orange, including bowler hats, white shirts, white trousers and black boots. Fans of the group, and sometimes members of Major Accident themselves, also occasionally wore fishtail coats, though more often they wore black leather biker jackets. The "clockwork punk" style also extended to an appreciation of Ludwig van Beethoven's music, again following the movie's protagonist. Major Accident played the composer's 9th Symphony with guitar, bass and drums in their interpretations The Glorious 9th and The March. Little evidence of any further interest in classical music was shown from the band.

Major Accident's use of A Clockwork Orange imagery is also seen in the sleeve designs on their albums, with their early LPs, CDs and seven-inch singles using stark black and white imagery (though they began to include red after their 1996 reformation), and characters dressed in the Clockwork Orange style. Their final album in 1985 (before their reformation) ...Crazy! depicts a scene from the film, where the protagonist, Alex, is shown strapped into a laboratory chair, his eyes held open with metal clips.

Other 1970s and 1980s Clockwork punk bands include The Adicts (whose version had a more fun, circus-clown emphasis), Die Toten Hosen (who released the themed album Ein kleines bisschen Horrorschau), Blitz (who wore some of the dress later in their career) and The Violators who along with Blitz recorded on the 'No Future' record label.

== Discography ==
Other versions of these releases also exist on other record labels. Those listed here are the original release versions.

=== 7 inch singles ===
Year of release	Title	Label	Vinyl colour(s)	Cat. No.
1983	Mr Nobody / That's You	Step-Forward Records	Black	SF 23
1983	Fight to Win / Freeman	Flicknife Records	Black	FLS216
1983	Leaders of Tomorrow / Breakaway / Dayo	Flicknife Records	Black	FLS 023
1984	Respectable / The Man on the Wall	Flicknife Records	Black	FLS 026
1994	Warboots / Terrorist Gang (Unofficial release)	Combat Rock	White / Black	CR 012
1999	Representation Not Reality / Step By Step	Upstart Productions	Clear Burgundy	Up7001

=== Studio albums ===
Year of release	Title	Tracks	Label	Format	Vinyl Colour	Cat. No.
1982	Massacred Melodies	Schizophrenic / (Standing On The) Sidelines / Last Night / Psycho / People / Terrorist Gang / Warboots / Mr Nobody / Self Appointed Hero / That's You / Brides Of The Beast / Classified Information / Middle Class Entertainment /Clockwork Toys	Step-Forward Records	Vinyl	White / Black	SFLP 9
1984	A Clockwork Legion	Respectable / Twisted Mind / Affliction / Cue The Dead / Leaders Of Tomorrow / Intro / The March / Sorry / Fight To Win / Bad Company / Vendetta	Flicknife Records	Vinyl	Black	SHARP 016
1985	...Crazy!	Crazy / Get Ready / Valerie / Camouflage / Band Played On / Get Ready (Dub) / Bad Co. / Leaders / Sorry / The Man On The Wall / Respectable / Twisted Mind / Cue The Dead	Toxic Shock Records / Massacred Music	Vinyl	Black	SACRED3
1996	The Ultimate High	Wired / The Ultimate High / Better Off Without You / Stay Away From Me / Lies / Your Worst Enemy / Pervert / Nightmare / They're Gonna Kick To Kill / Gang Warfare / Joy Rider / Snap / Crazy	We Bite	Vinyl / CD	Black	WB1-160-1 / WB 1-160-2

=== Studio split album ===
Year of release	Title	Split artist	Major Accident tracks	Label	Format	Vinyl Colour	Cat. No.
2001	Cry Of The Legion	Foreign Legion	Outta Control / Step By Step / Wasted Years / Déjà Vu / Ghost In My House / Representation Not Reality	DSS	Vinyl / CD	Black / White	DSS025 / DSS024

=== Live album ===
Year of release	Title	Tracks	Label	Format	Cat. No.
1984	Tortured Tunes (Live-The Official Bootleg)	Cue The Dead / Fight To Win / Brides Of The Beast / Schizo / Freeman / Mr. Nobody / Sorry / Respectable / Bad Company / M.C.E. / Warboots / White Riot / Oxo / Hokey Cokey / Breakaway / Headbanger / Dayo	Syndicate Records	Vinyl	SYN LP 9

=== Compilation albums ===
Year of release	Title	Type	Tracks	Label	Format	Cat. No.
1985	Pneumatic Pneurosis	Singles	Mr Nobody / Fight To Win / Leaders Of Tomorrow / Respectable / The Glorious 9th / That's You / Freeman / Dayo / Breakaway / The Man On The Wall	Flicknife Records	Vinyl	SHARP 027
1994	Massacred Melodies / A Clockwork Legion	Two albums	Schizophrenic / (Standing On The) Sidelines / Last Night / Psycho / People / Terrorist Gang / Warboots / Mr. Nobody / Self Appointed Hero / That's You / Brides Of The Beast / Classified Information / Middle Class Entertainment / Clockwork Toys / Respectable / Twisted Mind / Affliction / Cue The Dead / Leaders Of Tomorrow / A Clockwork Legion (1. Intro 2. The March) / Sorry (We Can't Help You) / Fight To Win / Vendetta	Captain Oi! Records	CD	AHOY CD 27
1996	Crazy / Tortured Tunes	Two albums	Crazy / Get Ready / Valerie / Camouflage / Band Played On / Sherwood Rangers / Bad Co. / Leaders / Sorry / The Man On The Wall / Respectable / Twisted Mind / Cue The Dead / Tortured Tunes / Cue The Dead / Fight To Win / Brides Of The Beast / Freeman / Mr. Nobody / M.C.E. / Warboots / White Riot / Hokey Cokey / Breakaway / Headbanger / Dayo	Dojo Limited	CD	LOMACD43
1998	Clockwork Heroes	Best of	Warboots / Terrorist Gang / Mr. Nobody / That's You / Schizophrenic / Brides Of The Beast / Clockwork Toys / Fight To Win / Freeman / Leaders Of Tomorrow / Dayo / Breakaway / Glorious 9th / Twisted Mind / Cue The Dead / Sorry / Bad Company / Respectable / Man On The Wall / Crazy / Valerie / Band Played On / Sherwood Rangers	Captain Oi! Records	CD	AHOY CD 16
2004	The Clockwork Demos	Demos	Terrorist Gang / Standing On The Sidelines / People Like You / Suzy Is A Headbanger (originally by the Ramones) / Headline Story / That's You / Self Appointed Hero / Black And White / Wasted Life (originally by Stiff Little Fingers) / White Riot (originally by The Clash) / Alternative Ulster (originally by Stiff Little Fingers / Borstal Breakout (originally by Sham 69) / Oxo Song / In The World Today / Blitzkrieg Bop (originally by the Ramones) / Garageland (originally by The Clash) / Crazy / The Radio Interview	Captain Oi! Records / Durty Mick Records	CD / Ltd. White Vinyl	AHOY CD 56 / DMR0008-1

=== Video ===
Year of release	Title	Tracks	Label	Format	Cat. No.
1997	Live In Munich '96	Mr Nobody / Crazy / Warboots / Worst Enemy / Respectable / Schizophrenic / Wired / Joyride / Phycho / Fight To Win / The Ultimate High / Bad Company / Cue The Dead / Brides Of The Beast / Last Rough Cause / Leaders Of Tomorrow	RF	VHS, PAL	RF113

== Bibliography ==
- Burning Britain: The History of UK Punk 1980–1984 by Ian Glasper Cherry Red Books (2004). ISBN 1-901447-24-3
