= Demobbed (disambiguation) =

Demobbed usually refers to demobilization, the standing down of military personnel.

Demobbed may also refer to:

- Demobbed (1944 film), a British comedy about ex-soldiers trying to find employment
- Demobbed (2000 film), a cult Russian comedy with an absurdist view on the Russian army

== See also ==
- Demob (disambiguation)
- D Mob, producer of house music (since 1988), from Staffordshire, England
- D-Mob, a video game character in Def Jam Vendetta and Def Jam: Fight for NY
