= 36206 =

Studio album by Sledgeback
- Released: February 2016
- Genre: Punk rock
- Label: Grundrecords
- Producer: Gabor Hun

Sledgeback chronology
Land of the freak (2014)	36206 (2016)

Professional ratings
Review scores
Source	Rating
Index.hu	9/10 stars
Uberrock.co.uk	9/10 stars

36206 is the sixth full-length album of the Seattle rock band Sledgeback. Released in 2016 by Grundrecords, the sound of the album is general punk rock.

== Track listing ==
1. "Unchosen" - 1.28
2. "Éjjeli Járat" - 3:25
3. "Kids of the street" - 2:58
4. "Kirakatfeleség" - 2:43
5. "Múló Állapot" - 2:41
6. "System" - 2:56
7. "Búcsúlevél" - 3:31
8. "Maradék Élet" - 3:12
9. "No destination" - 2:49
10. "Hagyj Élni" - 3:04
11. "Jól Vagyok" - 2:50
12. "Wasted" - 2:16
13. "Úton" - 3:32
14. "Gotti" - 1:02
15. "The hate" - 3.18

== Catalog number ==
Catalog number: GR060
