= Lajos Szakacsi =

Lajos Szakácsi
- Born: Lajos Szakacsi; 1946 (age 78–79); Budapest, Hungary
- Occupation: Film producer
- Years active: 1975–2012

Lajos Szakacsi was born in Budapest and worked in the film industry from 1975 to 2012. He oversaw the production of the award winning movie Fateless before his retirement. He is the father of the American music producer and guitarist Gabor Szakacsi.

== Filmography ==
- The man from London
- Fateless
- Dolina
