= Ground Breaking Ceremony =

Studio album by Himsa
- Released: November 2, 1999
- Studio: Raimstorm Studio
- Genre: Hardcore punk, metalcore
- Label: Revelation Records
- Producer: Steve Carter, Paul Speer

Himsa chronology
Himsa 7" EP (1999)	Ground Breaking Ceremony (1999)	Courting Tragedy and Disaster (2003)

Ground Breaking Ceremony is Himsa's first album. It was released on 2 November 1999 through Revelation Records (Rev# 87). This was the only full-length album not to feature John Pettibone as vocalist.

== Track listing ==
1. "Daylight Savings" - 1:20
2. "The Great Depression" - 2:40
3. "Another Version of the Twist" - 3:38
4. "Ground Breaking Ceremony" - 5:11
5. "Carrier" - 3:26
6. "Mud" - 3:08
7. "Cremation" - 4:42
8. "The Date Is Here" - 5:05
9. "Tapas" - 3:58
10. "White Out" - 5:21

== Personnel ==
Band

- Christian "Xtian" Schmitt – lead vocals, kalimba, maracas, tambourine; mixing, design
- Brian Johnson – lead guitar, backing vocals; mixing, design
- Aaron "Edge" Connell – rhythm guitar, keyboards, backing vocals; layout, mixing, design
- Derek Harn – bass, backing vocals; mixing, design, photography
- Mike Green – drums, percussion, backing vocals; mixing, design

Additional personnel

- Ariel Lapidus – backing vocals
- Steven Srithonsuk – lyrics (tracks 8)
- Paul Speer – production, sound engineer, mastering, mixing
- Steve Carter – production, sound engineer, mastering, mixing
- Amelia Wood – photography
- Mike Witherspoon – photography
- Wally Young – photography
