= Land of the Freak =

Land of the freak

Studio album by Sledgeback
- Released: September 2014
- Genre: Punk rock
- Label: Sliver records
- Producer: Gabor Hun

Sledgeback chronology
7 years like a broken record (2012)	Land of the freak (2014)	36206 (2016)

Professional ratings
Review scores
Source	Rating
Disagreement.net	8/10 stars
Uberrock.co.uk	9/10 stars

Land of the freak is the fifth full-length album of the Seattle rock band Sledgeback. Released in 2014 by Sliver records, the sound of the album is general punk rock.

== Track listing ==
1. "Snitch" - 1:05
2. "Kill my feelings" - 1:35
3. "All night long" - 3:46
4. "New world order" - 1:25
5. "The hate" - 3:18
6. "Land of the freak" - 1:36
7. "Frustration" - 3:04
8. "Hooligans" - 2:50
9. "Never look down" - 1:48
10. "So long baby" - 3:30
11. "Come" - 1:55
12. "I am" - 3:39
13. "Wait for you" - 3:31
14. "Hey ballerina" - 3:53
