= Courting Tragedy and Disaster =

Studio album by Himsa
- Released: June 17, 2003
- Recorded: Winter 2002
- Studio: Robert Lang (Shoreline, Washington); Orbit Audio (Seattle, Washington)
- Genre: Metalcore, melodic death metal
- Length: 43:12
- Label: Prosthetic Records
- Producer: Steve Carter

Himsa chronology
Ground Breaking Ceremony (1999)	Courting Tragedy and Disaster (2003)	Hail Horror (2006)

Courting Tragedy and Disaster is the second studio album by American metalcore band Himsa. It was released on June 17, 2003.

The album's style is consistent with most metalcore bands of the early 2000s, drawing comparisons to God Forbid, Shadows Fall and Darkest Hour. The music combines Swedish death metal-style dual guitar riffs and solos with hardcore punk-influenced screaming and shouting. The album's style is considered to be uniform throughout its eleven tracks.

== Track listing ==
1. "Dominion" – 3:16
2. "Rain to the Sound of Panic" – 3:57
3. "A Girl in Glass" – 4:55
4. "Kiss or Kill" – 4:17
5. "Jacob Shock" – 3:17
6. "Cherum" – 4:17
7. "It's Nights Like This That Keep Us Alive" – 3:06
8. "Loveless and Goodbye" – 4:46
9. "Scars in the Landscape" – 3:37
10. "Sense of Passings" – 4:07
11. "When Midnight Breaks" – 3:58

== Personnel ==
- John Pettibone – vocals
- Tim Mullen – drums
- Kirby Charles Johnson – guitar
- Sammi Curr – guitar, keyboards
- Derek Harn – bass
- All words and music written by Himsa except tracks 4 and 5 (by Himsa and Brian Johnson)
- Additional backing vocals by Brandan Schieppati, Aaron Edge, Shane Hellmuth, and Ariel Lapidus
- Additional lead guitar on track 9 by Matt Wicklund

=== Production ===
- Produced and engineered by Steve Carter
- Recorded Winter 2002 at Robert Lang Studios and Orbit Audio – Seattle, Washington
- Mixed by Steve Carter and Himsa at Rainstorm Studio – Bellevue, Washington
- Mastered by Paul Speer at Rainstorm Studio – Bellevue, Washington
- Assistant engineer: Justin Armstrong
