= Bite the Bullet (Sledgeback album) =

Bite the bullet

Studio album by Sledgeback
- Released: November 2010
- Genre: Punk rock
- Length: 38 minutes
- Label: Sliver records
- Producer: Gabor Hun

Sledgeback chronology
Perception becomes reality (2006)	Bite the bullet (2010)	3 of a kind (2012)

Bite the bullet is Sledgeback's third full-length album. The sound of the album is general punk rock. The album contains 13 tracks. There are twelve songs on the album. The thirteenth track is an edited version of the opening song, Palinka.

== Basic information ==
Bite the bullet is the third full-length album of the Seattle rock band Sledgeback. Released by Sliver records in November 2010. This is the first album of the group that has been flagged as explicit content (by iTunes) because of the opening song "Palinka" contains foul language. ("Palinka" is an alcoholic beverage)

== Track listing ==
1. Palinka 2:54
2. Dead city 2:55
3. Insane 2:02
4. A mile away 2:33
5. No man's land 2:51
6. Beer 3:04
7. Scarheart 3:17
8. Dead boy dead girl 3:28
9. Hey (Heidi) ho 2:36
10. Falling down 3:10
11. Wasted gang 2:45
12. Don't look down on me 3:39
13. Palinka (Radio edit) 2:52

== Other ==
- Track #5 "No mans land" and track #9 "Hey ho" released on the split album "Reality bites" in 2010.
- Track #13 is the "radio edit" of track #1 "Palinka". The band placed this version on the album without the explicit content that appears in the original lyric of the song.

== Reviews ==
- Disagreement magazine
- Nostalgia for Infinity review
- Sparkplug magazine (Los Angeles) review
- The Punksite.com review
