= Excess, Betrayal...And Our Dearly Departed =

Studio album by The Generators
- Released: April 6, 2003
- Genre: Punk rock
- Label: People Like You Records
- Producer: Rich Mouser

The Generators chronology
State of the Nation (2002)	Excess, Betrayal...And Our Dearly Departed (2003)	The Winter of Discontent (The Generators) (2005)

Excess, Betrayal...And Our Dearly Departed is the fourth album by American punk rock band The Generators. It was released on April 6, 2003, on People Like You Records in Europe and Japan, and in the US in December 2004 by Fiend Music. Excess. Betrayal was a musical turning point for the band, seeing a more darker & emotional direction. After a short hiatus and line up change in early 2003, the band teamed up with longtime producer Rich Mouser in creating one of the band's most notable release.

== Track listing ==
All songs by Dagger/Doosky unless otherwise noted.

1. "Roll Out The Red Carpet" (Dagger/Doosky/Danny)
2. "Skeletons"
3. "New Disease"
4. "Thirty Seconds" (Dagger/Danny/Doosky)
5. "My Curse"
6. "Out Of The Shadows"
7. "Wasting Your Time"
8. "Dying In A Rock N' Roll Band"
9. "Transmitter"
10. "Tranquilized"
  - 5 Bonus tracks were included on the US release from the upcoming The Winter Of Discontent

== Credits ==
- Doug Dagger – Lead Vocals
- Sir Doosky – Lead & Rhythm Guitars, Acoustic Guitar, Vocals
- Danny Damned – Guitar on "Skeletons", Piano on "Thirty Seconds", "Dying in a Rock N'Roll Band"
- Don Osterberg – Bass & Backing Vocals
- Dirty Ernie – Drums & Backing vocals
- Cover Illustration by Munk One
