= Himsa =

American metalcore band

Background information
- Origin: Seattle, Washington, U.S.
- Genres: Metalcore, melodic death metal
- Years active: 1998–2008, 2017–present
- Labels: Revelation, Prosthetic, Century Media

Himsa was an American metalcore band from Seattle, Washington. Formed in 1998, their band name is from the Sanskrit word himsa, which means "harm" or "violence".

The group released four full-length studio albums, two EPs and one DVD before their disbandment in 2008.

Loudwire compared them to Killswitch Engage, Parkway Drive and Unearth.

== History ==
The band formed in 1998 and released an independent EP and full-length album in 1999 on Revelation Records. Before being signed to Prosthetic Records, the band released one more EP in 2001, which was also on Revelation.

2003 saw Himsa record and release their album Courting Tragedy and Disaster. Following the release of the album the band toured extensively throughout the US and other parts of the world. They spent the latter half of 2005 in Denmark, recording their follow-up album, Hail Horror.

In November 2006, Himsa announced that they have signed with Century Media Records.

On April 23, 2007, Himsa entered the studio to work on their new album, Summon in Thunder, which was released on September 18, 2007. This was their only studio album released on Century Media Records. This album added a more melodic death metal sound to the band.

In the summer of 2016 they reunited and played a few practice shows opening for other bands. They played under various names including Crushpile and Metalmucil. Their official reunion show was October 31, 2016, at El Corazon. They are set to play Northwest Terror Fest May 31 – June 2, 2018. The reunion lineup is all of the final lineup except Chad Davis on drums. John Pettibone has stated the band won't do any touring other than playing in the Seattle area.

=== Touring ===
In early 2006, Himsa toured with Darkest Hour, The Acacia Strain, A Life Once Lost, and Dead to Fall. During November 2006, they toured Australia with Parkway Drive and Cry Murder.

=== Disbandment ===
Himsa advertised that their August 16, 2008, at El Corazon in Seattle was to be their last show ever.

On June 20, 2008, bassist Derek Harn issued a statement as follows: "After 10+ years, four releases, countless tours and almost incomprehensible (yet constant) upheaval, the last three years of the band have been relatively stable. Having sacrificed everything we had in order to ensure the band's survival it's time to let it go. We made a great CD (Summon in Thunder/Century Media); reportedly, our best. We've got a great label. We're getting along, we've toured and we're fine. It's all good. We're leaving it at that."

Vocalist John Pettibone said that he will devote all his time to side bands such as The Vows and has said he is done with touring. Pettibone has since joined Seattle band Heiress, which has released a self-titled 7-inch and a split 7-inch with Narrows.

== Band members ==
=== Current lineup ===
- Derek Harn – Bass (1998–2008, 2017–present)
- Kirby Charles Johnson – Guitar (2000–2008, 2017–present)
- John Pettibone – Vocals (2000, 2000–2008, 2017–present)
- Josh 'Sammi Curr' Freer – Guitar (2003, 2005–2008, 2017–present)
- Chad Davis – Drums (2003–2007, 2017–present)

=== Former members ===
- Christian "Xtian" Schmitt – Vocals (1998–1999)
- Brian Johnson – Vocals, Guitar (1998–2000, 2000–2002)
- Henry – Guitar (1998–1999)
- Aaron Edge – Guitar (1998–1999)
- Mike Green – Drums (1998–2000)
- EJ Bastien – Guitar (1999–2000, 2000)
- Chris LaPointe – Vocals (2000)
- John Harnett – Drums (2000)
- Tim Mullen – Drums (2000–2003)
- Clay Layton – Keyboard, Samples (2000–2001)
- Matt Wicklund – Guitar (2003, 2003–2005)
- Joe Frothingham – Drums (2007–2008)

1998–1999	1999	1999	1999–2000
Xtian – Vocals; Brian Johnson – Guitar; Aaron Edge – Guitar; Henry – Guitar; Derek Harn – Bass; Mike Green – Drums	Xtian – Vocals; Brian Johnson – Guitar; Aaron Edge – Guitar; Derek Harn – Bass; Mike Green – Drums	Xtian – Vocals; Brian Johnson – Guitar; EJ Bastien – Guitar; Derek Harn – Bass; Mike Green – Drums	Brian Johnson – Vocals, Guitar; EJ Bastien – Guitar; Derek Harn – Bass; Mike Green – Drums
2000	2000 Asian Tour	2000	2000–2001
John Pettibone – Vocals; Brian Johnson – Guitar; EJ Bastien – Guitar; Derek Harn – Bass; Mike Green – Drums	Chris LaPointe – Vocals; Kirby Charles Johnson – Guitar; Derek Harn – Bass; Mike Green – Drums	John Pettibone – Vocals; Brian Johnson – Guitar; Kirby Charles Johnson – Guitar; EJ Bastien – Guitar; Derek Harn – Bass; Tim Mullen – Drums	John Pettibone – Vocals; Brian Johnson – Guitar; Kirby Charles Johnson – Guitar; Clay Layton – Guitar; Derek Harn – Bass; Tim Mullen – Drums
2001–2002	2002–2003	2003	2003
John Pettibone – Vocals; Brian Johnson – Guitar; Kirby Charles Johnson – Guitar; Derek Harn – Bass; Tim Mullen – Drums	John Pettibone – Vocals; Sammi Curr – Guitar; Kirby Charles Johnson – Guitar; Derek Harn – Bass; Tim Mullen – Drums	John Pettibone – Vocals; Sammi Curr – Guitar; Kirby Charles Johnson – Guitar; Matt Wicklund – Guitar; Derek Harn – Bass; Chad Davis – Drums	John Pettibone – Vocals; Sammi Curr – Guitar; Kirby Charles Johnson – Guitar; Derek Harn – Bass; Chad Davis – Drums
2003	2003–2005	2005–2007	2007–2008
John Pettibone – Vocals; Sammi Curr – Guitar; Kirby Charles Johnson – Guitar; Derek Harn – Bass; Chad Davis – Drums	John Pettibone – Vocals; Matt Wicklund – Guitar; Kirby Charles Johnson – Guitar; Derek Harn – Bass; Chad Davis – Drums	John Pettibone – Vocals; Sammi Curr – Guitar; Kirby Charles Johnson – Guitar; Derek Harn – Bass; Chad Davis – Drums	John Pettibone – Vocals; Sammi Curr – Guitar; Kirby Charles Johnson – Guitar; Derek Harn – Bass; Joe Frothingham – Drums

== Discography ==
Studio albums

- Ground Breaking Ceremony (1999)
- Courting Tragedy and Disaster (2003)
- Hail Horror (2006)
- Summon in Thunder (2007)

EPs

- Himsa (1999)
- Death Is Infinite (2001)

DVDs

- You've Seen Too Much (2005)
