= People Like You Records =

Rock record label in Dortmund, Germany

- Founded: 1999; 26 years ago
- Founder: Andre Bahr
- Status: Independent
- Genre: Punk rock, psychobilly, rock and roll, heavy metal
- Country of origin: Germany
- Location: Dortmund
- Official website: peoplelikeyourecords.com

People Like You Records (also known as I Used To Fuck People Like You In Prison Records) was a rock record label founded by Andre Bahr in 1999. The label is independent, but it belongs to the Century Media Records. The office for People Like You is located in Dortmund, North Rhine-Westphalia.

== Artists ==
- Blitzkid
- Bloodlights
- Callejon
- Demented Are Go
- Eskimo Callboy
- Mad Sin
- The Meteors
- The Peacocks
- Red Aim
- Roger Miret and the Disasters
- Slime
- U.S. Bombs
