= C.A.F.B. =

Hungarian rock band

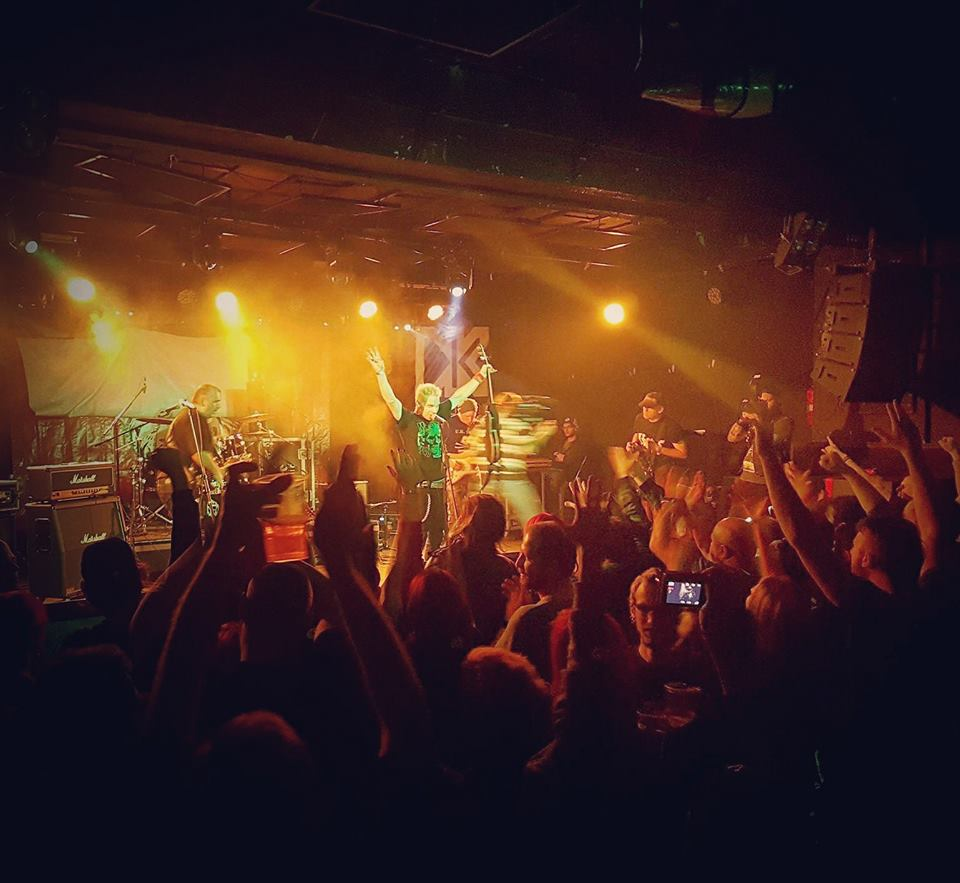
- C.A.F.B. in 2017

Background information
- Origin: Budapest, Hungary
- Years active: 1990–present
- Members: Lajos Suto; Laca Urban; Gábor Szakácsi; Lajos Szollosy
- Website: cafb.hu

C.A.F.B. is a Hungarian alternative rock band from Budapest, originally formed in 1990 with Gábor Szakácsi and Mihaly Szita. The band has been through several line-up changes between 2004 and 2014 but officially never broke up. After many short lived temporary line-ups the group reunited with its most successful late 1990s members in 2015.

== Name ==
C.A.F.B. is an abbreviation for "Cops Are F*ing Bastards" (as The 4-Skins song "A.C.A.B.) which has been used by the band until 1997 when they signed to Premier Art Records. Then they started calling it simply "4 musical chords" because of pressure from the label's management.

== History ==
=== Early years (1990–1994) ===
C.A.F.B. formed in 1990 and started playing live shows in early 1991. Immanuel Olah joined the band late 1991, replacing the first drummer. He wrote and sang about forty percent of the songs performed by the band from 1991 to 1994. With the help of Benedek Fliegauf C.A.F.B. has been booked in the legendary alternative rock club "Black Hole" the first time ever in the summer of 1991 which helped the group move forward and get noticed in the Budapest punk scene. From 1991 C.A.F.B. regularly performed at the famous club with some of the most important Hungarian hardcore and punk rock bands of the era, like A.M.D., Leukemia and Tankcsapda. They recorded their first album Utcastilus ("Street style") in 1992 but it did not release until 1998, (when the "Hungarian Metal Hammer" magazine owned label, "Hammer music" issued the material for the first time ever) in limited edition. Later in 1993 the Hungarian underground label Trottel records signed the group and released the full-length album, Ne bizz senkiben ("Don't trust anybody") which featured the song "B.R.F.K." (Budapest Police dept.). The song almost instantly became a crowd favorite because of its anti-establishment lyrics. Szita and Olah left the band in 1994 when Szakacsi was serving his one-year army service.

- Mihaly Szita (1974–2001), the first bass player and founding member of C.A.F.B., died in 2001.
- Immanuel Olah – After leaving C.A.F.B. in 1994 Olah joined the band Balaton.
- Gábor Szakácsi – a member from 1990 to 1999 playing shows and recording with the band. From 2000 to 2004 he recorded his final 2 albums and started his new band Sledgeback in the USA. He appeared on stage with C.A.F.B. in September 2009 when he was visiting his hometown Budapest.
- Benedek Fliegauf helped the band in the early days as "manager" and booked some of C.A.F.B.'s most important live performances in the 1991–1992 period. He was a classmate of Mihaly Szita and their first drummer Tamas Hermecz. In 1998 he interviewed Gábor Szakácsi about the band. It has been released in the weekly Hungarian program magazine "Pesti Musor". This interview was titled "Kispunk" ("Little punk") and Fliegauf used the name "Petervari Benedek".

=== The transition (1995–1996) ===
The first temporary lineup of C.A.F.B. formed in early 1995 after Szakacsi returned from his military service. The group consisted of friends, mostly from the group that started the successful Hungarian "jungle beat" outfit Brains from this lineup, (Balazs Babinecz, Gergely Jeli, Abel Tokes) following the departure of Szakacsi. Brains moved to different direction, and Szakacsi brought together another short lived project for a 1996 summer tour with members of the punk band, Leguan. The final and most recognized lineup of C.A.F.B. got its shape following the 1996 summer tour.

=== In the mainstream (1997–1999) ===
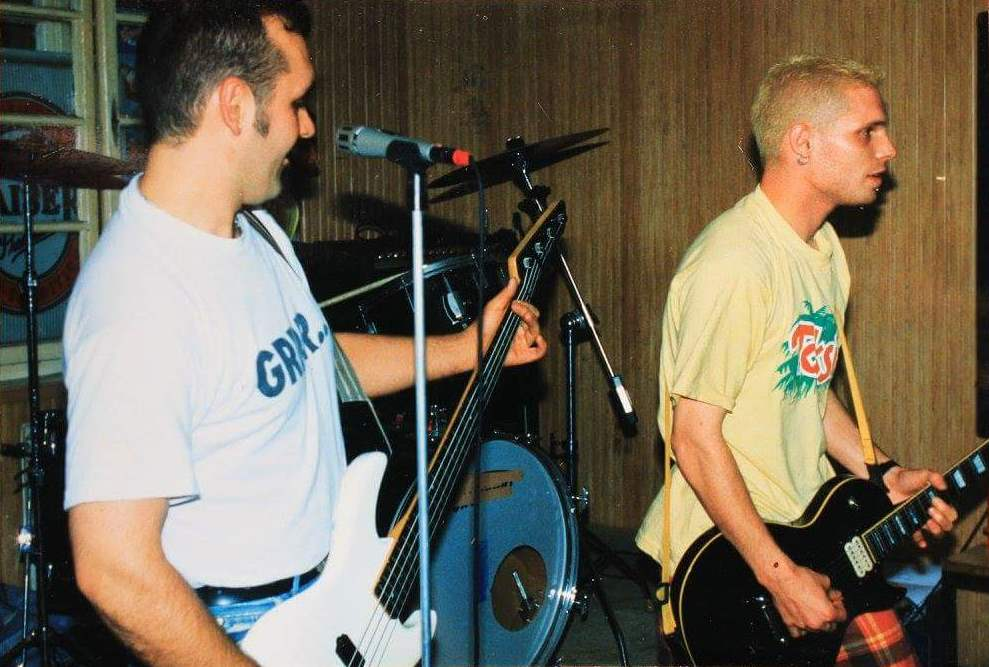
C.A.F.B. in 1998

C.A.F.B. recorded the album Zanza at Reaktor studios Budapest with Gabor Nemeth (Bikini) producer. Released by Premier Art records in September 1997, the album featured the song "Engedj be". The music video that was filmed for this song was a major success and was featured on many Hungarian TV networks in 1997 and 1998. The video mainly hit the rock music charts of VIVA TV that time. A year later C.A.F.B. recorded its next album Minden-hato ("All-mighty") but Premier Art refused to release it. This work later came out by Edge records which is part of "Metal Hammer Hungary".

=== The late C.A.F.B. (2000–2009) ===
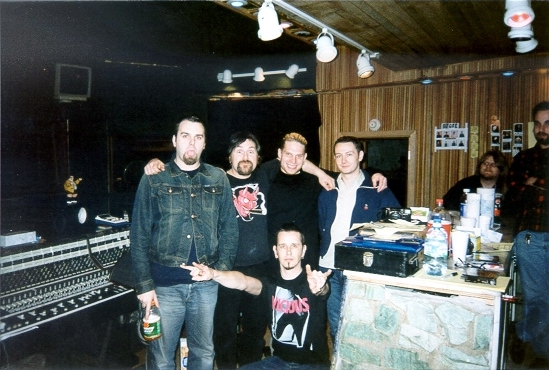
Gábor Szakácsi with Therapy? in Seattle (2001).L-R-Graham Hopkins; Andy Cairns; Gábor Szakácsi; Michael McKeegan.-Front:Martin McCarrick

Szakacsi left for Seattle in 1999 but occasionally traveled to Budapest to record the albums 'Subkontakt" (2001) and "Naiv" (2004). He did not play any live shows with the group until 2015.

=== No originals (2008–2014) ===
C.A.F.B. recorded the "Szennyhullam" ("Wastewave") album which featured cover songs of well known Hungarian underground artists of the 1980s and 1990s.

=== Reunion (2016) ===
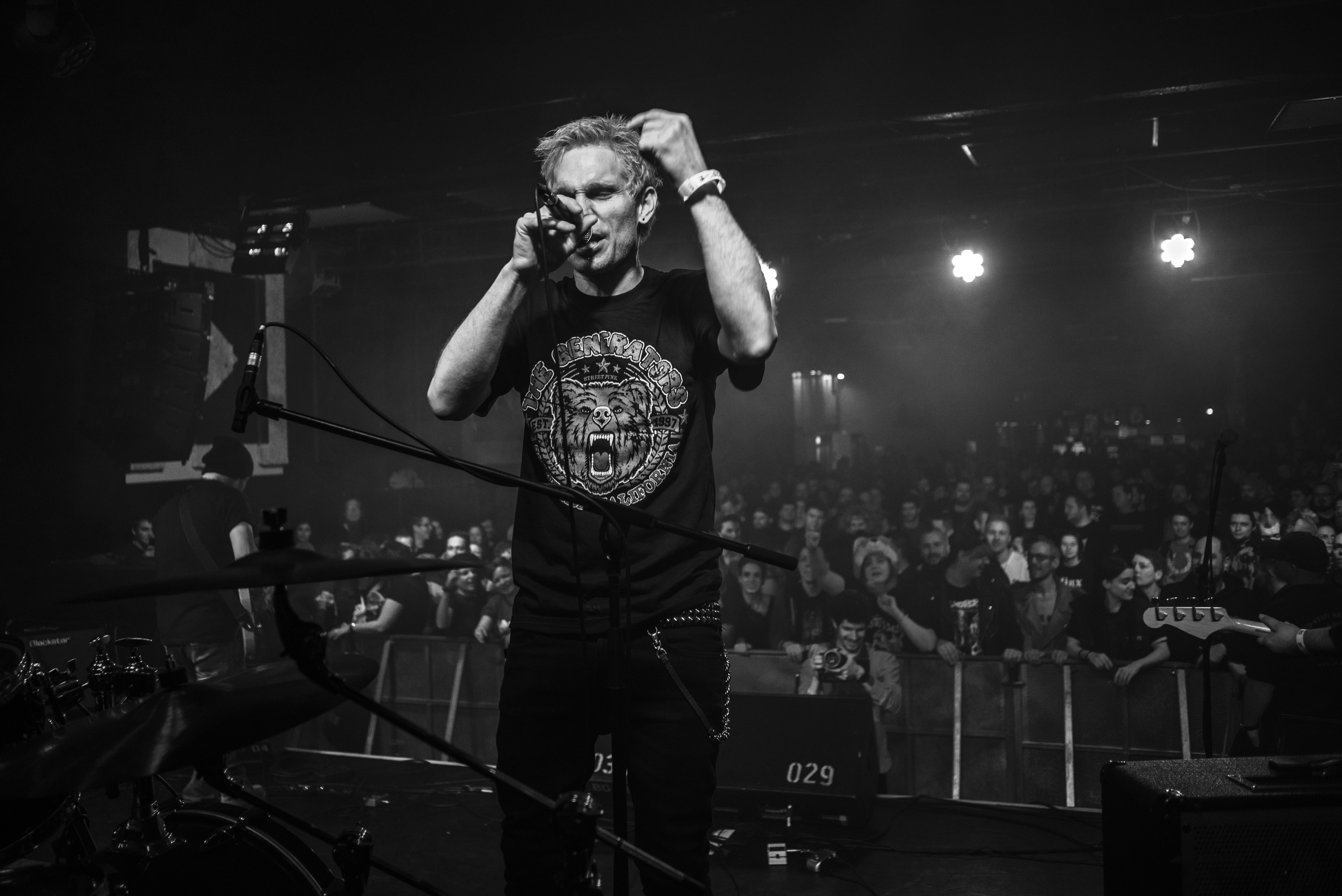
Gábor Szakácsi

C.A.F.B. reunited in 2016 for a performance in Budapest on 18 March.

== Unfortunate events and beyond ==
=== Church burning ===
Immanuel Olah, former drummer, vocalist, and songwriter of C.A.F.B. from 1991 to 1994, was sentenced to ten months prison in 2007 after vandalizing and later burning down a church in southeast Hungary. He was a "cantor" at the time, according to major Hungarian news agencies like "Magyar Nemzet Online" and "Index.hu".

=== Fatality ===
After a long battle with heroin addiction, Mihaly Szita, a founding member and former bass player of the group from 1990 to 1994, died in 2001.

=== Attempted suicide ===
Not long after departing C.A.F.B. in 1998, Zoltan Horniak, keyboard player attempted suicide according to a February 2000 C.A.F.B. interview released in the Hungarian edition of the famous rock music magazine "Metal Hammer". Horniak was treated in a psychiatric facility. He has returned to C.A.F.B. in 2008.

== Discography ==
=== Albums ===
- 1234 2018 (EP)
- C.A.F.B. 2017 (self-titled) CD
- EP'17 2017 (EP)
- Vándorcirkusz 2015 (EP)
- 3 of a kind 2012 (Split album with Sledgeback)
- Egység, Kétség, Háromság... 2011 (Split album with Elit Osztag and Utolsó Alkalom)
- Szennyhullam 2009 (Self release) CD
- Naiv 2004 (Aurora records) CD
- Subkontakt 2001 (Edge records) CD
- Minden-hato 1999 (Edge records) CD
- Zanza, 1997 (Premier art records) CD
- Ne bizz senkiben 1993 (Trottel records)

=== Tapes ===
- Klubbang 1998 (Live recordings and demos)
- Archiv 1992 (Live 1992 Dec.19 with Tankcsapda)
- Utcastilus 1992 (The first release)

=== Compilations ===
- Sokk&Roll 1998 (Various Artists)

=== Videography ===
- "Engedj be" (1997) from the album "Zanza"
- "Lator" (2001) from the album "Subkontakt"

== Side projects ==
- Sokol 403
- Cuki Presszó
- Ramonez
