= Doug Dagger =

American singer (1967–2024)

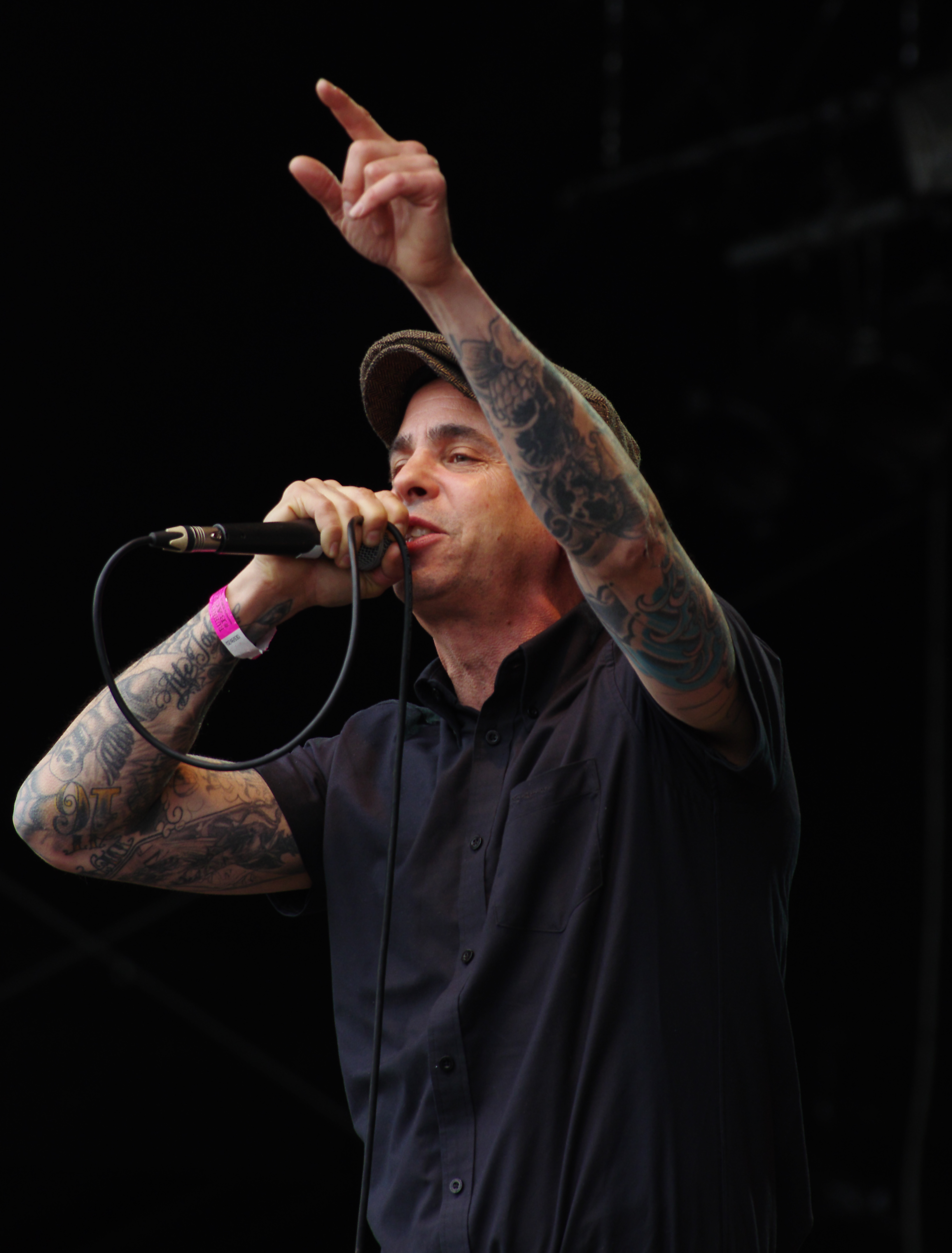
- Dagger performing in 2013

Background information
- Born: October 17, 1967; New York City, U.S.
- Died: May 30, 2024 (aged 56) Los Angeles, California, U.S.
- Genres: Punk rock
- Instrument: Vocals
- Years active: 1988–2024
- Formerly of: The Generators; Schleprock; Doug & The Slugz; Bedlam Knives

Douglas Scott Kane (October 17, 1967 – May 30, 2024), known professionally as Doug Dagger, was an American vocalist. He was the lead singer for the Los Angeles punk rock band The Generators, which formed in 1997, and was lead singer for Schleprock and other punk bands.

== Life and Early Career ==
Kane was born in New York City into an entertainment family, his mother having been a nightclub showgirl and his father an entertainment manager. Kane was also the grandson of 1930s Vaudeville musician Buster Shaver.

Kane moved to South Pasadena, California in 1978, and by 1981 he was involved in the early Los Angeles punk scene. By 1983, at the age of 15, Kane was singing in his first punk band, Doug & The Slugz.

== Professional career ==
=== Schleprock ===
In the summer of 1988, Kane began singing for the Alhambra-based punk band Schleprock.

By 1990, the band had released their first EP, Do It All on Nemesis Records alongside labelmates The Offspring. Over the next decade, Kane and Schleprock released six more EPs: Looking Back (1992), Gotta Get Out (1993), Spring (1993), Migraine (1994), Something Like That (1994) and Out Of Spite (1995).

Schleprock also released two full-length albums: Hide & Seek (1993) and Propeller (1994). They signed a deal with Warner Bros. Records in 1996, and released their last full-length album Americas Dirty Little Secret.

Over a stretch of eight years, the band supported such bands as Green Day, NOFX, Blink 182, Primus, Bad Religion, The Specials and Face to Face.

Schleprock disbanded in February 1997.

=== The Generators ===
Within six months of Schleprock's disbandment, Kane formed a new band called The Generators.

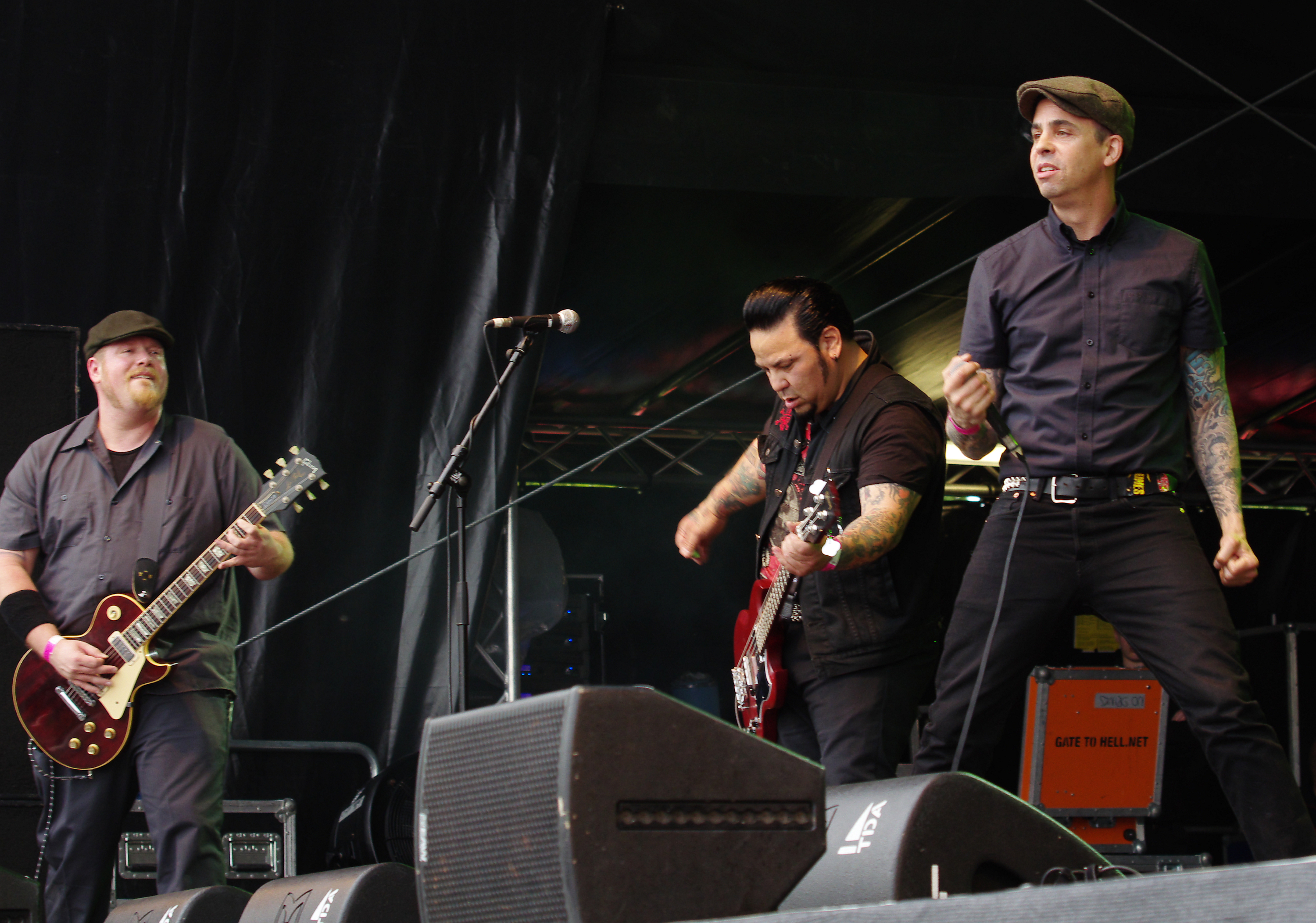
The Generators in 2013

The band released its first full-length album Welcome To The End in 1998 on Triple X Records.

The Generators then released seven more full-length albums: Burning Ambition (2000), Tyranny (2001), Excess, Betrayal and Our Dearly Departed (2003), Winter Of Discontent (2005), Great Divide (2007), Between The Devil & The Deep Blue Sea (2009) and Last Of The Pariahs (2011) (along with many other splits and EPs).

The Generators developed popularity and a cult following in Europe, later signing with Randale Records for the release of their 9th studio album.

The Generators contributed music for the Los Angeles Lakers, California Angels, Corono and The Grammy Awards foundation.

In April 2012, Doug started a new band called the Bedlam Knives.

== Death ==
Kane resided in Los Angeles, and owned and operated a clothing and uniform business in between touring and making records. He died from cancer on May 30, 2024 at the age of 56.

== Discography ==
=== Schleprock ===
- Do It All 7-inch (1989), Nemesis Records
- Looking Back 7-inch (1992) Empty Records
- Gotta Get Out 7-inch (1992) Kool Records
- Hide & Seek (1993) Last Resort Records
- Ten Speed 7-inch (1993) Last Resort Records
- Migraine 7-inch (1994) Break Even Point Records, Italy
- Something Like That 7-inch (1994) Dr, Strange Records
- Propeller (1994) Dr. Strange Records
- Out Of Spite (1995) Dr. Strange Records
- America's Dirty Little Secret (1996) Warner Bros. Records
- Long Time Ago - Anthology (1997) Cool Guy Records
- Learning To Fall - Anthology (2005) People Like You, Europe

=== The Generators ===
- Welcome to the End (1997), Triple X Records, US
- Ninety-Nine (1999), Outcast Records/ Triple X Records, Europe
- Burning Ambition (2000), Urgent Music Ltd. US / People Like You, Europe & Japan
- Dead at 16 7-inch, TKO Records
- Tyranny (2001), TKO Records US / People Like You, Europe & Japan
- State of the Nation (2002), TKO Records/ Dead Beat, US
- Sounds of the Street Vol. 2: Urgent Music Ltd. US, Split CD with Vicious Rumors
- From Rust to Ruin TKO Records (Compilation: greatest hits album)
- Riverboat Gamblers split 7-inch Pirates Press Records
- Excess, Betrayal...And Our Dearly Departed (2003), People Like You, Europe & Japan, Fiend Music, US
- The Winter of Discontent (2006), People Like You, Europe & Japan, Sailor's Grave, US
- The Great Divide (2007), People Like You, Europe & Japan
- Between the Devil and the Deep Blue Sea (2009), Concrete Jungle/People Like You, Europe & Japan
- Last Of The Pariahs (2011), IHP Records, Europe & Japan, DC-Jam Records, US
- The Deconstruction of Dreams (Concrete Jungle Records 2013)
- Life Gives-Life Takes (Randale Records 2014)

=== Bedlam Knives ===
- Bedlam Knives - Self Titled Demo (2010)
- Here Comes Trouble - EP (Dr. Strange Records 2013)
