= Demob (band) =

English punk rock band

- Origin: Gloucester, England, UK
- Genre: Punk rock
- Years active: 1978–1983, 2001–2008, 2011–present
- Labels: Round Ear, Amber
- Members: Andy Kanonik; Terry Elcock; Steve Z Marcus Harley
- Past members: John Melfah; Mike Howes; Tony Wakefield; Chris Rush; Mark "Miff" Smith; Paul Price; Barry Philips; Richard Baldwin; Timothy Howkins.

Demob are an English punk rock band from Gloucester, England.

== History ==
=== 1978-1983 ===
Demob formed in late 1978 by guitarist Terry Elcock and drummer Johnny Melfah, in Coney Hill Gloucestershire they were joined by friend and neighbour Mike Howes (vocals), Tony Wakefield (bass) and Chris Rush (guitar). Howes asked ex-army skinhead friend Andy Kanonik to join supporting on vocals. This line-up rehearsed initially in Terry's bedroom.

Demob's first break into the music industry came in the summer of 1979, they fooled the local authority into letting them have a place in the annual carnival parade. Their inclusion resulted in a public riot between punk rockers and bikers and ultimately the suspension of the carnival. The riot made national press coverage and attracted the interest of an independent record label Round Ear Records.

In 1980, Howes was sacked from the band, and Kanonik was imprisoned for three months, leaving the band without a singer. The band had just recruited Mark "Miff" Smith to replace Rush, and he took over the role of singer Smith suggest an accomplished bass player Paul "Fatty" Price to replace Tony Wakefield on bass. Mark Smith soon become an integral part in the band, arranging and organising gigs. With the line-up now comprising Mark Smith (vocals), Terry Elcock (guitar), Paul Price (bass guitar), and Johnny Melfah (drums), This band worked on their first recordings. "Anti-Police" was Demob's first release on the independent Round Ear Records, the record was supported by the late John Peel, and journalist Garry Bushell. The record spent over two months in the UK Indie Chart, peaking at number 34. Paul Price left the band just before the release of Anti Police. The band advertised on the Anti Police single that a bassist was required and Barry Philips took on the role as bass player.

On the back of the success of "Anti-Police", Demob supported many acts around the punk circuit at this time, including U2, UK Subs, The Angelic Upstarts, Discharge and The Beat. Most performances ended with a police presence and inevitable violence.

At a U2 Boy Tour gig in the Marshall Rooms Stroud Gloucestershire, Demob persuaded the promotors to allow Demob to play a couple of their songs. They did this and when U2 eventually got on stage U2 were heckled and had objects thrown at them due to their poor performance by the audience at the gig.

Now with their notorious hardcore followers, the 'Demob Riot Squad ', the band's multi-racial line-up sometimes attracted hostility from Nazi skinheads who attended their gigs, and the band would play several concerts in aid of the Anti-Nazi League.

A second single, "No Room For You" quickly followed to add to their success. The song is about music venues being closed by the local authorities across the UK. The single is acclaimed on the international punk scene as a classic punk record and the song has been recorded and played by many punk rock bands around the world.

Demob split to pursue other musical avenues in 1983.

=== Re-formation ===
Since 1983, some of the band members had gone on to other bands, while others had given up on music. Melfah had some success as a boxer and opened a boxing gym in Gloucester. Smith formed a new band called Garrison Damn. Elcock had played with several bands in between being in Demob such as Kiss The Blade, Destijl and in 2016 Elcock formed Spectrum 4

Spurred on by interest from American label Grand Theft Audio in re-releasing the old material, in 2001 the label contacted Elcock and he reformed Demob with a revised line-up to tour the United States, Japan and Europe. The revised line-up consisted of Terry Elcock (guitar), Andrew Kanonik (vocals), Richard Baldwin (bass), and Timothy Howkins (drums).

In 2004 their first US tour took place and subsequently others followed, Demob was fortunate to play at New Yorks legendary CBGB's before it closed in 2006.

In October 2005, Howkins left Demob due to his painting. business commitments and Baldwin also left to concentrate on working with Superdry Clothing as their graphics director Howkins was replaced with Marcus Harley.

Elcock left the band and a line-up of various session musicians and another guy who went on to play with Kanonik and Harley. Elcock described the unit as a 'tribute act', pointing out that the band performing as Demob didn't have any of the original recording performers on their first single releases Anti Police and No Room For You.

In 2011, Elcock returned with the Welsh musician, Steve Z playing bass guitar Marcus Harley on drums and Andy Kanonik on vocals. Demob was back.

This current line-up continues to date and it is the longest formation of any Demob musician members. In 2015 the band started work on creating another album. Still No Room a take on the bands most popular single. No Room For You

Whilst on a 2016 US west coast tour, Andy met his future wife and subsequently moved to live in California.

To ensure the legacy of the bands songs last the test of time, Demob released all previous CD albums on Mad Butcher Records.

== Current members ==
- Andy Kanonik – vocals
- Terry Elcock – guitar
- Steve Z – bass
- Marcus Harley – drums

== Discography ==
Chart placings shown are from the UK Indie Chart.

- "Anti Police" (1981) – Round Ear Records 7-inch vinyl (#34)
- "No Room For You" (1981) – Round Ear Records 7-inch vinyl (#28)
- Better Late Than Never (2002) – Amber Records CD album (1982 singles tracks plus new material)
- Contractual Obligations – Grand Theft Audio CD album
- If It Ain't Punk It Don't Rock – Amber Records CD album
- Live In Japan – Sanction Release Studios DVD
- Crime Through Time – Punk Records.com 33 rpm vinyl
- Better Late Than Never – Mad Butcher Records 33 rpm vinyl (2023)
- If it ain't Punk it don't Rock – Mad Butcher Records 33 rpm vinyl (2023)
- Anti Police – Mad Butcher Records 45 rpm vinyl (2023)
- No Room For You – Mad Butcher Records 45 rpm vinyl (2023)
- Still No Room – Mad Butcher Records 45 rpm vinyl (2023)
