= Foreign Legion (band) =

Welsh punk band

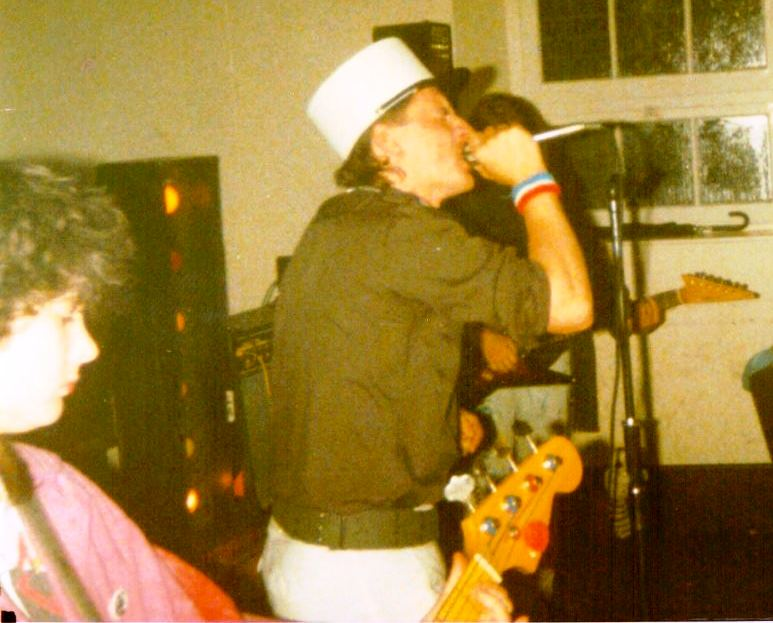
- Foreign Legion live in 1986

Background information
- Origin: Merthyr Tydfil, Wales
- Genres: Punk, street punk, oi!
- Years active: 1984–1991, 2000–present
- Labels: Aggrobeat, Rebel Sound, KB, Sliver, Rusty Knife, Marchiato A Fuoco, Oi! Shop, Trooper, Durty Mick, Dirty Faces, Upstart, DSS, Venture, Schlawiner, Rent a Racket
- Members: Simon Bendon – guitar/Lead vocals Dean Summers– bass/vocals Greg Boulton – drums
- Past members: (Vocals); Mark (Marcus) Howells (Guitar); David (Truskie) Thomas, Lynne Murphy, Julie Bailey, Andrew (Eggy) Heggie, Steven Thomas, Michael Elford, Peter Giles, Mark (Jolly) Williams, Mark Blaxland, Frank Busani, Miguel Emultschoenn. (Bass); Alan Powell (RIP), Helen James, Mark (Jolly) Williams, Andrew (Eggy) Heggie, Martyn Richards, Jarrad (Nöir) Owens, Ian Poulsom, Dog / Canis Humanus, Steve Z, John Hunt. Dave Linehan (Drums); Nigel Cleaver (deceased), Michael Wilding, Patrick McDermott, Paul (Marshon) Marsh, Mark (Froggy) Price, Pandy, Ben (Stan) Stansfield, Paul Black, Glyn (Sid Lovely) Bendon. (Keyboards); Paul (Marshon) Marsh.

Foreign Legion is a punk band from South Wales.

== History ==
=== 1984–1991 ===
Foreign Legion formed in 1984 by Marcus Howells, David (Truskie) Thomas, Alan Powell and Michael Wilding. The band changed the name to Foreign Legion from Dead On Arrival when hearing of the existence of Canadian punk band DOA. Marcus had previously been vocalist in a punk band called Society (1980-1981) with then drummer Paul Black, Welsh actor and former star of The Voice UK. Dead on Arrival had two tracks on the Sane Records compilation “On the Street”, “Child Molester” and “Zyklon B”. Both songs written by guitarist David Thomas. Dead on Arrival had one song on 1984's Bullsheep Detector album. Following the name change to Foreign Legion (due partly to people shortening it to DOA, which could cause confusion with the Canadian band of that name) and a number of line-up changes (drummers in particular). Wilding left to be replaced by Patrick McDermott who later, with Thomas, formed the cult Welsh psychedelic “Original Mind Band”. Foreign Legion released their first EP “Distress Signals” in 1984, recorded at Studio 2 in John Street, Cardiff. The cassette EP included Powell’s songs “Spy” and “European Sunshine” and two more from Thomas “Smile for the Cameras” and “TV Escape”. After a few dozen gigs in South Wales and London’s 100 Club, including support slots with 999, Angelic Upstarts, Vice Squad and UK Subs, the lineup imploded early in 1985. The new line up released their first EP on their own Rent a Racket label with the line-up of M.H. on vocals, Lynne Murphy on guitar, Helen James on bass and Paul (Marshon) Marsh on drums. Later line-up changes included Paul Marsh introducing keyboards to the band for a short while, Andrew Heggie taking over on guitar and Steven Thomas on bass.
Despite many live shows in London, Wales and France, three years passed before Surf City their second EP was released, with their first full-length album entitled Welcome to Fort Zinderneuf also released that same year, 1989. By this time a new line-up had evolved with Mark (Jolly) Williams on bass (from local band Blind Justice, who Andrew Heggie soon joined), together with Peter Giles on guitar and Ben Stansfield on drums, retaining only M.H. on vocals.
During the 1980s the band played regular slots in the famous 100 Club and supported the likes of UK Subs, The Vibrators, The Partisans, Picture Frame Seduction, The Adicts, Major Accident, Toy Dolls, Angelic Upstarts, 999, Broken Bones and others including Bérurier Noir for one of their first concerts overseas in France, following gig exchanges with Burning Ambitions from Le Havre. They also supported The Alarm, Joe Strummer & the Latino Rockabilly War and the UK Subs when they visited the band's home town of Merthyr Tydfil.

The band split up in 1991.

=== 2000–2023 ===
Foreign Legion re-formed in 2000, with members from before the 1991 split; M.H. on vocals, Mark (Jolly) Williams on guitar, Andrew Heggie on bass and Ben Stansfield on drums. They released a split album with Major Accident called Cry of the Legion, before their next full-length album What Goes Around, Comes Around, produced by Mick Jones of The Clash. During the early 2000s the band released EPs and played in mainland Europe and USA with the Dropkick Murphys, Major Accident, The Templars, NY Relics and the UK Subs, The Misfits, Agnostic Front, Bad Manners, Stiff Little Fingers, The Buzzcocks including a show at New York's CBGBs. In 2007 the album Death Valley was recorded, featuring more new material as well as a re-worked version of Message From Nowhere from the first EP. By 2008 Jarrad (Nöir) Owens and Paul Black had joined the band. This lineup re-recorded six songs written by Mark (Jolly) Williams at SKWAD HQ South Wales – the session captured the band's newly invigorated live sound; with double kick drums and distorted fuzz bass the thrash and metal influences of the new rhythm section were clearly evident. These recordings eventually became the band's contribution to Reality Bites a split 12 track CD album with US band Sledgeback and also appeared bootlegged, with an incorrect lineup credited.

Following an appearance at the Legendary TJs in Newport in 2008, supporting the Anti-Nowhere League, guitarist Williams posted a statement on the band's Myspace account announcing his departure; Black and Owens soon followed. Members of local Caerphilly punk covers band Doc Savage joined M.H. in Foreign Legion for a short while before a new line-up emerged with the drummer from 1980s Cwmbran punk band Impact (who also featured on the 1984 Bullsheep Detector album) Glyn (Sid Lovely) Bendon, together with Simon Bendon on guitar and Canis Humanus on bass.

A split EP with German band Riot Company was released in 2011, with a further split EP released in 2012 with Italian band Cervelli Stanki. The band were now back on the road with gigs including the Rebellion festival alongside bands including PiL, Rancid, Buzzcocks and Social Distortion.

Demob bassist Steve Z joined the band in 2013, with live performances including two German festivals: Punk and Disorderly and Back On The Streets, a tour of northern Italy and performances in the UK, including headlining the first day at Gosport Punk Festival (with the UK Subs headlining the other day) and support slots alongside Sham 69, 999, Stiff Little Fingers and The Men They Couldn't Hang plus a return to the Rebellion festival alongside bands including Sham 69, Jello Biafra and the Guantanamo School of Medicine, GBH, Discharge, Peter Hook and The Light, TV Smith and many more.

Light at the End of the Tunnel was recorded in 2013 and released on Germany's KB Records in August 2013. Featuring one song sung by bassist Z, the album features a number of songs referencing the band's Welsh working-class background, including Market Trader, Regeneration (Council List), and Miners (The Fathers' Sacrifice). The cover image by fellow Merthyr resident Gus Payne depicts a Welsh miner kneeling with his hand on the hilt of a sword planted into the ground, possibly referencing the sword in the stone myth and, along with the album title and the closing track Phoenix From The Flame, provides a positive theme with hope for the future. Vocalist M.H. confirms this intent to project hope for the future; "Light At The End Of The Tunnel is meant to give hope and strength to all the working class people all over the word, that the shining sword...".

Singer Mark Howells died in June 2023.

=== 2024–present ===
With the blessing of Mark (Marcus) Howells' daughter and brother, Foreign Legion continued in 2024, with guitarist Simon Bendon taking over on lead vocals.

2024 performances with this new line up began with support slots for The Professionals and Cockney Rejects together with a performance at Punk on the Peninsula festival in Scotland.

== Discography ==
=== Albums ===
Year of release	Title	Producer	Foreign Legion tracks (* track positions in brackets for mixed split release)	Personnel	Split artist	Label	Format	Vinyl colour	Cat. No.
2021	The Early Years (Compilation LP)		(Distress Signals); Spy; TV Escape; Smile For The Camera; European Sunshine; Brand New Cadillac (Trenchline EP); Trenchline; Message From Nowhere; National Affairs; Lots Of Fun (Surf City EP); Surf City; What A Place To Be; Why Take My Life Away; Those Were The Days	(Distress Signals); MH (vocals); Truskie (guitar); Powell (bass); Mike (drums) (Trenchline EP); MH (vocals); Lynne (guitar); Hel (bass); Marshon (drums) (Surf City EP); MH (vocals); Peter (guitar); Jolly (bass); Stan (drums); Pandy (drums)		Puke N Vomit Records	Vinyl	Sky blue and dark blue splatter / Yellow / Pink / Black	PNV 102
2018	Back Tö Basics		Back Tö Basics; Murderer; Hömeless; Uncle Tom; She's A Punk; Bullshit; Heröes Welcöme; Strange Töwn; Drink; Start A War	MH (vocals); Simon (guitar); Steve Z (bass/vocals); Sid (drums)		Violated Records	CD		PUNK CD023
2020 (Rerelese)	Back Tö Basics		Back Tö Basics; Murderer; Hömeless; Uncle Tom; She's A Punk; Bullshit; Heröes Welcöme; Strange Töwn; Drink; Start A War	MH (vocals); Simon (guitar); Steve Z (bass/vocals); Sid (drums)		Clockwork Punk	Cassette		CWP 018
2020 (Rerelese)	Back Tö Basics		Back Tö Basics; Murderer; Hömeless; Uncle Tom; She's A Punk; Bullshit; Heröes Welcöme; Strange Töwn; Drink; Start A War	MH (vocals); Simon (guitar); Steve Z (bass/vocals); Sid (drums)		Street Justice	Vinyl	Orange	SJ013-1
2016	Always Working Class		We Are Legion~; Dogoodgers; Nowhere Left To Hide~; Drugs For Mugs~; Bare Faced Lies; Justice~; Criminally Insane~; Nev's Birthday Bash; Fat Cats~; Know Where You Are~; This Is Our Music~# Still No Punks In My Town	MH (vocals); Simon (guitar); John (bass/vocals); Dave (bass/vocals on ~) (guitar on #); Sid (drums)		Aggrobeat	CD		ABCD032
2020 (Rerelese)	Always Working Class		We Are Legion~; Dogoodgers; Nowhere Left To Hide~; Drugs For Mugs~; Bare Faced Lies; Justice~; Criminally Insane~; Nev's Birthday Bash; Fat Cats~; Know Where You Are~; This Is Our Music~# Still No Punks In My Town	MH (vocals); Simon (guitar); John (bass/vocals); Dave (bass/vocals on ~) (guitar on #); Sid (drums)		Laketown Records	Vinyl	Yellow / Black	LTR-013
2020 (Rerelese)	Always Working Class		We Are Legion~; Dogoodgers; Nowhere Left To Hide~; Drugs For Mugs~; Bare Faced Lies; Justice~; Criminally Insane~; Nev's Birthday Bash; Fat Cats~; Know Where You Are~; This Is Our Music~# Still No Punks In My Town	MH (vocals); Simon (guitar); John (bass/vocals); Dave (bass/vocals on ~) (guitar on #); Sid (drums)		Traditional Style Records / Inatoxx Oi! Records	Cassette		TSR-003 / ITX 10
2013	Light at the End of the Tunnel	Lyndon Price	Jenny; What A Place To Be; Regeneration (Council List); My Radio; Hey Girl; George Best; Stalker; Market Trader; Three Years (The Untold Story); Miners (The Fathers' Sacrifice); Drunken Heroes; Phoenix From The Flame	MH (vocals); Simon (guitar); Steve Z (bass/vocals); Sid (drums)		KB Records	CD		3221
2014 (Rerelese)	Light at the End of the Tunnel	Lyndon Price	Jenny; What A Place To Be; Regeneration (Council List); My Radio; Hey Girl; George Best; Stalker; Market Trader; Three Years (The Untold Story); Miners (The Fathers' Sacrifice); Drunken Heroes; Phoenix From The Flame	MH (vocals); Simon (guitar); Steve Z (bass/vocals); Sid (drums)		Aggrobeat / Rebel Sound	Vinyl	Green-mint / Green with red splatter	ABLP015
2010	Reality Bites (Split LP)		*(2) Sunset On Babylon (3) Wake Up (6) Obvious (7) Johnny (10) Fake Gangsta (11) Wasted	MH (vocals); Jolly (guitar); Jarrad Noir (bass); Paul Black (drums/backing vocals)	Sledgeback	Sliver Records	CD		367524
2021 (Rerelese)	Reality Bites (Split LP)		*(2) Sunset On Babylon (3) Wake Up (6) Obvious (7) Johnny (10) Fake Gangsta (11) Wasted	MH (vocals); Jolly (guitar); Jarrad Noir (bass); Paul Black (drums/backing vocals)	Sledgeback	Clockwork Punk	Cassette		CWP 023
2007	Death Valley		Lots Of Fun; Alright; Strange Town; Rat Race; Message From Nowhere; She Loves Me Not; Take A Look; Party In Prague; Where Do We Go; Sunset On Babylon; Death Valley; Lots Of Fun (Reprise)	MH (vocals); Jolly (guitar); Frank (guitar); Martyn (bass); Stan (drums)		Durty Mick Records	CD		DMR0004-3
2002	What Goes Around Comes Around	Mick Jones	Wake Up; Valleys Mentality; Don't Ask Me Why; Wish You Were Here; My Town; Another Day; FL; Powergames; Smiling Assassin; Obvious; Wheres Johnny Gone	MH (vocals); Frank (guitar); Eggy (bass); Stan (drums) Jolly guitar on 'Obvious', 'Another Day' and 'Valleys Mentality'		DSS Records	CD / Cassette		DSS043
2003 (Rerelese)	What Goes Around Comes Around	Mick Jones	Wake Up; Valleys Mentality; Don't Ask Me Why; Wish You Were Here; My Town; Another Day; FL; Powergames; Smiling Assassin; Obvious; Wheres Johnny Gone	MH (vocals); Frank (guitar); Eggy (bass); Stan (drums) Jolly guitar on 'Obvious', 'Another Day' and 'Valleys Mentality'		Jimmy Jazz Records	Cassette		JAZZ 053
2019 (Rerelese)	What Goes Around Comes Around	Mick Jones	Wake Up; Valleys Mentality; Don't Ask Me Why; Wish You Were Here; My Town; Another Day; FL; Powergames; Smiling Assassin; Obvious; Wheres Johnny Gone	MH (vocals); Frank (guitar); Eggy (bass); Stan (drums) Jolly guitar on 'Obvious', 'Another Day' and 'Valleys Mentality'		Street Justice	Vinyl	Yellow	SJ012-1
2001	Cry of the Legion (Split LP)		Clockwork Pop And Orange; Jump; Open Your Eyes; Fake Gangster; Hate Machine; Just A Faze	MH (vocals); Jolly (guitar); Eggy (bass); Stan (drums)	Major Accident	DSS Records	CD / Vinyl	Black	DSS024
2021 (Rerelese)	Cry of the Legion (Split LP)		Clockwork Pop And Orange; Jump; Open Your Eyes; Fake Gangster; Hate Machine; Just A Faze	MH (vocals); Jolly (guitar); Eggy (bass); Stan (drums)	Major Accident	Street Justice	CD / Vinyl	Red & black marbled	SJ016-1 (Vinyl + CD) / SJ016-2 (CD)
1990	Welcome to Fort Zinderneuf	Ian Wallace and Foreign Legion	Surf City; Keep Pushing Back; What A Place To Be; Message From Nowhere; Get Off My Back; Gentleman; Talk Dirty; Stop Messing Around; Why Take My Life Away; What Am I Gonna Do; Beau Geste; Those Were The Days	MH (vocals); Peter (guitar); Jolly (bass); Stan (drums)		Venture Records	Vinyl	Black	VR/FL 100
2021 (Rerelese)	Welcome to Fort Zinderneuf	Ian Wallace and Foreign Legion	Surf City; Keep Pushing Back; What A Place To Be; Message From Nowhere; Get Off My Back; Gentleman; Talk Dirty; Stop Messing Around; Why Take My Life Away; What Am I Gonna Do; Beau Geste; Those Were The Days	MH (vocals); Peter (guitar); Jolly (bass); Stan (drums)		Puke N Vomit Records	Vinyl	Pink / Purple / Red / Black	PNV 105

=== 7-inch vinyl ===
Year of release	Title	Foreign Legion track(s)	Personnel	Split artist(s)	Label	Vinyl colour(s)	Cat. No.
2017	Last Rough Cause / Föreign Legiön (Split)	Nev's Birthday Bash; Drugs For Mugs	MH (vocals); Simon (guitar); Dave Linehan (bass); Sid (drums)	Last Rough Cause	Aggrobeat	Black / Orange	ABEP034
2015	Oi! The International Street-Punk League (Split)	Nowhere Left To Hide; Our World Today	MH (vocals); Simon (guitar); Dave Linehan (bass); Sid (drums)	The Shame	Aggrobeat	Blue	ABEP022
2015	Oi! The International Street-Punk League (Split)	Nowhere Left To Hide; Our World Today	MH (vocals); Simon (guitar); Dave Linehan (bass); Sid (drums)	The Shame	Rebel Sound	Red	REB1038
2012	Clockwork Kids Still Alive! (Split)	Market Traders; Drunken Heroes	MH (vocals); Simon (guitar); Dog (bass); Sid (drums)	Cervelli Stanki	Rusty Knife Records; Marchiato A Fuoco; Oi! Shop	Black	
2011	Salute To The Boys (Split)	Phoenix From The Flames; Another Bullshit Night	MH (vocals); Simon (guitar); Dog (bass); Sid (drums)	Riot Company	KB Records	Picture disc / Black	KBR 061
2007	Foreign Legion / Suburban Lockdown (Split) (Live)	Where's Johnny Gone; Another Day	MH (vocals); Jolly (guitar); Frank (guitar); Martyn (bass); Stan (drums)	Suburban Lockdown	Durty Mick Records	Black	DMR0002-7
2007	Send In the Legion (Split) (2 different covers)	Powergames; Wake Up	MH (vocals); Jolly (guitar); Frank (guitar); Martyn (bass); Stan (drums)	Paris Violence	Trooper Records	Yellow	KBR 022
2000	Punk Rock Jukebox	Where's Johnny Gone; Rain; Alright (Stick Together)	MH (vocals); Jolly (guitar); Eggy (bass); Stan (drums)		DSS Records	Black	DSS 010
2000	The Years Gone By EP	Wake Up; Don't Ask Me Why; What Are You Doing Now; Jump	MH (vocals); Jolly (guitar); Eggy (bass); Stan (drums)		Upstart Productions	Green / Black	UP7004
2000	The We Don't Care About Rock 'n' Roll (Split)	There Ain't No Punks; 17 Years Of Hell* (*Partisans cover version)	MH (vocals); Jolly (guitar); Eggy (bass); Stan (drums)	District	Dirty Faces	Marbled	DF 89/01
1990	1984 Street Trash (Split) (Packaged with "1984 The Fourth" 12 inch album)	Get Off My Back	MH (vocals); Peter (guitar); Jolly (bass); Stan (drums)	Active Minds; Disgorge; Slaver	New Wave Records	Black	NW-033
1989	Surf City EP	Surf City; What A Place To Be; Why Take My Life Away; Those Were The Days	MH (vocals); Peter (guitar); Jolly (bass); Stan (drums); Pandy (drums)		Schlawiner Records	Green / Black	S 05
1986	Trenchline EP	Trenchline; Message From Nowhere; National Affairs; Lots Of Fun	MH (vocals); Lynne (guitar); Hel (bass/vocals); Marshon (drums)		Rent a Racket	Black	RRR0001
2019 (Rerelease)	Trenchline EP	Trenchline; Message From Nowhere; National Affairs; Lots Of Fun	MH (vocals); Lynne (guitar); Hel (bass/vocals); Marshon (drums)		Different Class Records	Black / Red / Yellow	DC-05-19

=== Compilations ===
Year of release	Title	Foreign Legion track(s)	Personnel	Other bands included	Label	Format	Cat. No.
1996	Oi! The Rarities, Volume 2	Message From Nowhere; Trenchline	MH (vocals); Lyn (guitar); Helen (bass/vocals); Marshon (drums)	Crash; Anti-Social; The Squats; Special Duties; Condemned 84; Resistance 77; Frankie Flame	Captain Oi! Records	Vinyl	AHOY LP 46
1989	Pop Oi!	Surf City	MH (vocals); Peter (guitar); Jolly (bass); Stan (drums); Pandy (drums)	Slaughter & the Dogs; The Crack; The Hoopers; Criminal Class; Five O American Eagle; The Kicker Boys; Frankie Flame; Moonstomp; Guttersnipe Army; The Strike; Madhatters; The Resort; The Business	Link Records	Vinyl	LINK LP 095

As Dead On Arrival

Year of release	Title	Dead On Arrival track	Personnel	Other bands included	Label	Format	Cat. No.
1984	On The Street	Child Molester / Zyklon B	MH (vocals); Truskie (guitar); Powell (bass); Cleaver (drums)	Primitive; Vicious Hamsters; Acid Attack; Oi Polloi; Devoid; The Abductors; Catch 22; Criminal Justice; Fungus; 4 Minute Warning; The Clergy; Obscene Females; Rough Justice	Sane Records	Vinyl	SANE 003
1984	Bullsheep Detector	Child Molester	MH (vocals); Truskie (guitar); Powell (bass); Cleaver (drums)	Icons of Filth; Impact; Death Patrol; No Choice; Sharpnel; Yr Anhrefn; Soldier Dolls; Armistice; Classified Protest; Reality Attack; Secluded; Abnormal; Condemned; No Label; Skull Attack; Living Legends; Pseudo Sadists; Picture Frame Seduction	Anti-Society Records	Vinyl	ANTI 020

== Bibliography ==
- Burning Britain: The History of UK Punk 1980–1984 by Ian Glasper (four pages on the band). Cherry Red Books (2004). ISBN 1-901447-24-3
