= List of punk rock bands, L–Z =

This is a list of notable punk rock bands (letters L through Z). The bands listed have played some type of punk music at some point in their career, although they may have also played other styles. Bands who played in a style that influenced early punk rock—such as garage rock and protopunk—but never played punk rock themselves, should not be on this list. Bands who created a new genre that was influenced by (but is not a subgenre of) punk rock—such as alternative rock, crossover thrash, grunge, metalcore, new wave, and post-punk—but never played punk rock, should not be listed either.

== L ==
Band name	Origin	Years active	Brief summary
L7	Los Angeles, California, US	1985–2001, 2014–present	A punk rock/grunge/hard rock/alternative metal band.
Lagwagon	Goleta, California, United States	1990–present	A pop punk/punk rock/skate punk/melodic hardcore band discovered by NOFX frontman, Fat Mike, who signed them to his label, Fat Wreck Chords.
Lard	Chicago, Illinois, US	1988–2000, 2020–present	An industrial rock/hardcore punk/industrial metal band formed by Jello Biafra.
Lars Frederiksen and the Bastards	Campbell, California, US	2001–2004	A street punk band with songs about drinking, fighting, drugs, sex and other aspects of street life. Led by Rancid's lead guitarist, Lars Frederiksen.
Lash	Perth, Western Australia, Australia	1996–2003	An all female pop punk/alternative rock band.
The Last Gang	Los Angeles, California, US	2010–present	The punk rock band was picked as one of 18 artists to watch in 2018 by Alternative Press.
Latex Generation	New York City, New York, US	1990–2006	A punk rock band.
Latterman	Huntington Station, New York, US	2000–2007, 2011–2012, 2016, 2018	A melodic punk rock band with vocals shared by Phil Douglas (Iron Chic) and Mattie Jo Canino (RVIVR), their songs often contain political and/or socially conscious lyrics. The band is considered highly influential in the pop punk genre with their album No Matter Where We Go...being considered a staple of the genre.
The Lawrence Arms	Chicago, Illinois, US	1999–present	A melodic punk rock band who was/are members of Slapstick, Tricky Dick, The Broadways, Baxter, The Falcon, Sundowner and Smoking Popes.
Leatherface	Sunderland, Tyne and Wear, England, UK	1988–1994, 1998–2012	A punk rock/hardcore punk/melodic hardcore band.
Leathermouth	New Jersey, US	2007–2010	A hardcore punk/post-hardcore/screamo side-project of Frank Iero, guitarist of My Chemical Romance.
Lemuria	Buffalo, New York, US	2004–2018	An indie rock/punk rock/emo/power pop band.
Letter Kills	Temecula, California, US	2002–2006, 2023–present	A rock/post-hardcore/alternative rock band.
Le Shok	Long Beach, California, US	1997–2001	A punk rock/new wave band.
Le Tigre	New York City, New York, US	1998–2007, 2010, 2016, 2022–present	An electronic rock/riot grrrl/electroclash/dance-punk band formed by Kathleen Hanna.
Left Alone	Wilmington, California, US	1996–present	A punk rock/pop punk/street punk/ska punk band with a considerable amount of influence from Rancid.
The Leftovers	Brisbane, Queensland, Australia	1976–1979, 1983, 2012–present	A Brisbane punk rock band.
The Leftovers	Portland, Maine, US	2002–2011	A pop punk/power pop band.
Leftöver Crack	Alphabet City, Manhattan, New York, US	1998–present	A political crust punk/hardcore punk/ska punk band with members of ska punk band, Choking Victim.
Legal Weapon	Los Angeles, California, US	1980–2018	A hardcore punk band with female vocals.
The Lemonheads	Boston, Massachusetts, US	1986–1997, 2005–present	An alternative rock/grunge/pop punk/jangle pop/power pop band.
Less Than Jake	Gainesville, Florida, US	1992–present	A ska punk/pop punk/punk rock/skate punk band that has achieved moderate success such as spawning a radio hit in 1998 with "History of a Boring Town" which reached No. 39 on the Billboard Modern Rock Tracks.
Lesser of Two	Fort Walton Beach, Florida, US	1989–2002	A hardcore punk/thrash metal band.
Let's Go Bowling	Fresno, California, US	1986–present	A ska/reggae band.
Leyton Buzzards	Leyton, East London, London, England, UK	1976–1980	A classic punk rock band.
The Libertines	London, England, UK	1997–2004, 2010, 2014–present	An indie rock/garage rock/post-punk revival band.
Life After Life	San Francisco, California, US	1993–1998	A punk rock/psychedelic rock band.
Life's Blood	New York, New York, US	1987–1989	A hardcore punk band.
Lifetime	New Brunswick, New Jersey, US	1990–1997, 2005–present	A melodic hardcore/hardcore punk band.
The Lillingtons	Newcastle, Wyoming, US	1995–2001, 2003, 2006–2008, 2013–2015, 2017–2020	A pop punk band. Kody Templeman (vocalist/lead guitarist) is also a member of Teenage Bottlerocket.
Limp	San Francisco Bay Area, California, US	1994–2002	A pop punk/punk rock/alternative rock/ska punk band.
Limp Wrist	Albany, New York, US	1998–present	A hardcore punk/queercore/powerviolence band.
Link 80	San Francisco Bay Area, California, US	1993–2002, 2016	A punk rock/pop punk/ska punk/hardcore punk/skacore band.
Lit	Orange County, California, US	1987–present	A pop-punk/post-grunge/alternative rock band.
Litmus Green	Southern California, US	1991–present	A hardcore punk band.
LiveonRelease	Vancouver, British Columbia, Canada	2000–2003	An all female pop punk band.
The Living End	Melbourne, Victoria, Australia	1994–present	A punk rock/pop punk/rockabilly/alternative rock/psychobilly band.
Living with Lions	Vancouver, British Columbia, Canada	2007–present	A pop punk/punk rock band.
Lobotomia	São Paulo, Brazil	1984–1989, 2002–2018, 2024	A hardcore punk/crossover thrash/thrash metal band.
Lockjaw	Surrey, London, England, UK	1977–78	A classic punk rock band. Simon Gallup (bassist) is also a member of The Cure.
The Locust	San Diego, California, US	1994–2022	A grindcore/mathcore/powerviolence/noise rock band and one of the first artists on Three One G Records.
Lolita No.18	Japan	1989–present	An all female punk rock band.
London	London, England, UK	1976–78, 2008–present	A classic punk rock band.
London SS	London, England, UK	1975–76, 2012–present	A rock/punk rock band. Mick Jones (guitarist) was also a member of The Clash.
Long Beach Dub Allstars	Long Beach, California, US	1997–2002, 2012–present	A reggae/ska/dub/punk rock band.
Long Beach Shortbus	Long Beach, California, US	2002–2007	A reggae/punk rock/pop rock/acoustic band.
Look Back and Laugh	Oakland, California, US	2004–2007	A hardcore punk/thrashcore band.
The Lords of the New Church	UK, US	1981–1989, 2001–2003, 2007	A gothic rock/post-punk/glam punk/punk rock supergroup featuring Stiv Bators of the Dead Boys, Brian James of The Damned, Dave Tregunna of Sham 69 and Nick Turner of The Barracudas.
A Loss for Words	Abington, Massachusetts, US	1999–2015, 2018, 2019, 2021	A pop punk/easycore band, formerly known as Last Ride until 2003.
The Lost Boys Club	Hilversum, Netherlands	2012–2017	The pop punk band is inspired by the melodies of bands such as Blink-182 and New Found Glory.
Lost Cherrees	Sutton, London, Surrey, England, UK	1979–1986, 2003–present	An anarcho-punk band.
Louna	Moscow, Russia	2008–present	A hard rock/punk rock band.
Love Equals Death	Petaluma, California, USA	2003–2009, 2019–2024	A punk rock band.
Love You to Death	Toronto, Ontario, Canada	1999–2015	A pop/power pop/pop punk band formerly known as The Pettit Project.
The Loved Ones	Philadelphia, Pennsylvania, US	2003–present	A punk rock/pop punk band.
The Low Budgets	Philadelphia, Pennsylvania, US	2000–2008, 2015, 2022	A punk rock/surf/garage rock band.
Lower Class Brats	Austin, Texas, US	1995–present	A street punk band highly influenced by the movie A Clockwork Orange.
Lucky 7	San Diego, California, US	1997–2003	In 1999, the pop punk band was awarded Best Rock band by San Diego Magazine, Top Internet Band by CNN World Beat and Best Alternative Band by MP3.com. In 2001, the band was awarded Top 5 Internet Band by Yahoo Internet Life and Best Rock band by San Diego Magazine.
Lucky Boys Confusion	Chicago, Illinois, US	1997–present	A punk rock/ska/hip hop/pop punk band. The band's song "Hey Driver" was featured in the movies Looney Tunes: Back in Action (2003), Without a Paddle (2004) and New York Minute (2004) as well as in the video game MVP Baseball 2004. The band's song "Bossman" was featured in a commercial for the gum Extra in 2008.
Ludichrist	Long Island, New York, US	1984–1989, 2012–present	A crossover thrash/hardcore punk/thrash metal band.
Ludwig von 88	Paris, France	1983–1999, 2016–present	A punk rock/alternative rock band.
The Lurkers	Uxbridge, West London, London, England, UK	1976–1979, 1982–1984, 1987–1997, 1999–present	A punk rock/new wave/pop punk band.

== M ==
Band name	Origin	Years active	Brief summary
Macc Lads	Macclesfield, Cheshire, England, UK	1981–1995, 1997, 2018–present	A punk rock/hard rock/comedy rock band.
Mad Caddies	Solvang, California, US	1995–present	A ska punk/reggae/punk rock/pop punk band.
Mad Sin	Germany	1987–present	A psychobilly/punk rock/country/heavy metal band.
Magazine	Manchester, England, UK	1977–1981, 2009–2011	A post-punk/new wave/art punk band featuring ex-Buzzcocks vocalist, Howard Devoto.
Magnapop	Atlanta, Georgia, US	1989–1997, 2002–present	An alternative rock/power pop/pop rock/pop punk band who charted the singles "Slowly, Slowly" and "Open the Door".
Magnolia Park	Orlando, Florida, US	2018–present	A pop punk/alternative rock/nu metal band.
Major Accident	Darlington, England, UK	1977–1985, 1996–2000	A punk rock/Oi! band noted for dressing similar to 'droogs' from the Stanley Kubrick film, A Clockwork Orange.
Make Do and Mend	West Hartford, Connecticut, US	2003–2016	A post-hardcore/emo band.
Male	Düsseldorf, Germany	1976–1980, 1990, 2002–present	A classic punk rock/Deutschpunk band.
Malignus Youth	Sierra Vista, Arizona, US	1987–1994, 1999–2001, 2014	A hardcore punk/melodic hardcore band.
Man Alive	Jerusalem, Israel	1999–present	A punk rock band.
Manic Hispanic	Orange County, California, US	1992–present	A Chicano punk rock/comedy music band.
Man Is the Bastard	Claremont, California, US	1990–1997	A powerviolence/hardcore punk/noise rock/sludge metal band.
Mano Negra	Paris, France	1987–1994	A Latin alternative/ska punk/rock en Español/worldbeat band.
Masters of the Backside	England, UK	1976	The classic punk rock band's members went on to greater success: Chrissie Hynde later fronted The Pretenders, and Dave Vanian, Captain Sensible and Rat Scabies were subsequently founding members of The Damned.
Masters of the Obvious	New Orleans, Louisiana, US	1981–present	A garage punk/pop punk/indie rock band.
Matanza	Rio de Janeiro, Brazil	1996–2018	A hardcore punk/heavy metal/cowpunk/psychobilly band.
Matchbook Romance	Poughkeepsie, New York, US	1997–2007, 2009–2012, 2015–2016	A pop punk/emo/post-hardcore/melodic hardcore band. Their song "Monsters" appeared in Madden NFL 07, Arena Football: Road to Glory and Guitar Hero III: Legends of Rock.
Math the Band	Providence, Rhode Island, US	2001–present	A chiptune-based synthpunk band. Also, a nintendocore/punk rock/indie rock/electronic band.
Matt Toka	Youngstown, Ohio, US	2006–2013, 2017–present	An alternative rock/punk rock/pop punk artist best known for the song "Ode To My Family".
No Matarás	Buenos Aires, Argentina	1990–present	A punk rock band.
The Matches	Oakland, California, US	1997–2009, 2014–2018	A pop punk/alternative rock/ska band.
The Max Levine Ensemble	Washington, D.C., US	2000–present	A DIY pop punk/power pop/punk rock band who are on Plan-It-X Records.
Maxeen	Long Beach, California, US	2003–2008	A pop punk/punk rock/rock band. || ||
Maximum the Hormone	Hachiōji, Tokyo, Japan	1998–present	A nu metal/hardcore punk/metalcore/alternative metal/funk metal band.
Mayday Parade	Tallahassee, Florida, US	2005–present	A pop punk/pop rock/alternative rock/emo band.
MC5	Detroit, Michigan, US	1963–1972, 1973–1975, 1992, 2003–2011, 2018–2019, 2022–2024	A hard rock/garage rock/proto-punk/blues rock band who are famous for its original lineup which helped lay the foundations for punk rock.
mclusky	Cardiff, Wales, UK	1996–2005, 2014–present	A post-hardcore/noise rock band.
MDC	Austin, Texas, US	1979–1995, 2000–present	A hardcore punk band with strong sociopolitical views. Initials stand for Millions of Dead Cops, among other things.
Me First and the Gimme Gimmes	San Francisco, California, US	1995–present	A punk rock/pop punk/skate punk cover band which was formally fronted by NOFX's Fat Mike.
Me Vs Hero	Blackpool, Lancashire, England, UK	2007–2015	The melodic hardcore/metalcore band were known for their inclusion of hardcore punk and heavy metal influences to complement their pop punk sound.
Mealticket	Los Angeles, California, US	1991–1997	A ska punk band.
The Meatmen	Lansing, Michigan, US	1981–1988, 1993–1997, 2008–present	A hardcore punk/heavy metal band.
Meat Puppets	Phoenix, Arizona, US	1980–1996, 1999–2002, 2006–present	An alternative rock/alternative country/post-punk band that began as an early hardcore punk band, but changed dramatically beginning on their second album, incorporating elements from cowpunk, acid rock, psychedelia and grunge throughout their career.
Mega City Four	Farnborough, Hampshire, England, UK	1987–1996, 2007, 2024–present	A pop rock/indie rock/pop punk/grebo band.
The Mekons	Leeds, West Yorkshire, England, UK	1976–present	A classic punk rock/post-punk/alternative rock band.
The Members	Camberley, Surrey, England, UK	1976–1983, 2007–present	A classic punk rock band.
The Membranes	Blackpool, Lancashire, England, UK	1977–1990, 2009–present	A classic punk rock/post-punk/noise rock band.
The Men	Brooklyn, New York, US	2008–present	A punk rock/post-hardcore/post-punk/Americana/noise rock band.
The Men That Will Not Be Blamed For Nothing	London, England, UK	2008–present (on hiatus since 2022)	A punk rock band that incorporate elements of steampunk, thrash metal, hardcore punk, goth and Victorian music hall.
Mentors	Seattle, Washington, US	1976–1997, 2000–present	A heavy metal/hard rock/punk rock band.
The Menzingers	Scranton, Pennsylvania, US	2006–present	A punk rock band.
Merauder	New York, New York, US	1990–present	A metalcore/hardcore punk band.
Mere Dead Men	England, UK	1986–present	A classic punk rock band.
Mest	Blue Island, Illinois, US	1995–2006, 2008–present	A pop punk/ska punk/alternative rock band that has tour with bands like Goldfinger and Social Distortion. Their 2001, 2003 and 2005 albums charted in the US.
Métal Urbain	Paris, France	1976–1980, 2003–present	An electronic rock/classic punk rock band.
The Methadones	Chicago, Illinois, US	1993, 1999–2010, 2011, 2014, 2020, 2022–present	A punk rock/pop punk band.
M.I.A.	Las Vegas, Nevada, US	1982–1988, 2008, 2014	A hardcore punk band.
Middle Class	Santa Ana, California, US	1977–1982, 2011–2014	A punk rock/hardcore punk/post-punk band.
Midtown	New Brunswick, New Jersey, US	1998–2005, 2014, 2022–present	A pop punk/punk rock band that is most known for their 2002 album, Living Well Is The Best Revenge.
The Mighty Mighty Bosstones	Boston, Massachusetts, US	1983–2004, 2007–2022	A ska punk/ska/ska-core/hardcore punk band who had a big hit song in the mid-1990's, "The Impression That I Get".
Miles Away	Perth, Western Australia, Australia	2002–present	A hardcore punk band.
Mill a h-Uile Rud	Seattle, Washington, US	2003–present	A Celtic punk/Scottish Gaelic punk band.
Millencolin	Örebro, Sweden	1992–present	A punk rock/skate punk/pop punk/ska punk band. The name Millencolin is derived from the skateboard trick, "melancholy". In 2003, the band received the Best Swedish Rock award from the Swedish Hit Awards. Their 2005 album, Kingwood, debuted at No. 2 in the Swedish chart.
Million Dead	London, England, UK	2000–2005	A post-hardcore/punk rock/hardcore punk/alternative rock/emo band that spawned folk punk artist, Frank Turner.
Mindless Self Indulgence	New York, New York, US	1997–2015, 2024–present	An electronic rock/digital hardcore band that incorporates various genres of rock, including industrial rock, shock rock and synthpunk.
Mindsnare	Melbourne, Victoria, Australia	1993–present	A hardcore punk/metalcore band.
Mink DeVille	San Francisco, California, US	1974–1986	A classic punk rock band associated with CBGB. The band played a variety of different musical styles, including roots rock, soul, rhythm and blues, blues, Cajun and Latin rock.
Minor Threat	Washington, D.C., US	1980–1983	An influential hardcore punk band formed by Ian MacKaye, before he formed Fugazi in 1987.
Minutemen	San Pedro, California, US	1980–1985	An influential hardcore punk/art punk/punk rock/post-punk/avant-garde band featuring legendary bassist Mike Watt. The band split up after D. Boon was killed in a van accident in 1985.
Mischief Brew	Philadelphia, Pennsylvania, US	2000–2016	A folk punk/anarcho-punk band.
Los Miserables	Santiago, Chile	1990–present	A left-wing political punk rock/hardcore punk/ska/alternative rock band, formed after the demise of the military regime of Augusto Pinochet.
Misfits	Lodi, New Jersey, US	1977–1983, 1995–present	A pioneer of horror punk, whose career was cut short after original singer Glenn Danzig broke the band up in 1983. Twelve years later, the Misfits reformed without him, although Glenn Danzig reunited with the hardcore punk/classic punk rock/heavy metal band in 2016.
Mixtapes	Cincinnati, Ohio, US	2009–2014, 2017	The pop punk/indie rock/skate punk band toured with several notable acts such as Masked Intruder and Bayside. The band released splits with Direct Hit!, Broadway Calls and Jabber.
The Mob	Yeovil, Somerset, England, UK	1979–1983, 2011–present	An anarcho-punk band.
Mob 47	Stockholm, Sweden	1982–1987, 2005–present	A D-beat/hardcore punk/crust punk band.
Moderat Likvidation	Malmö, Sweden	1980–1985, 2007–present	A hardcore punk/D-beat band.
Modern Life Is War	Marshalltown, Iowa, US	2002–2008, 2012–present	A melodic hardcore/hardcore punk band.
Modern Warfare	Long Beach, California, US	1980–1983	A hardcore punk band.
Modey Lemon	Pittsburgh, Pennsylvania, US	1999–2010	A garage rock/punk blues band.
Mod Sun	Bloomington, Minnesota, US	2009–present	Debut album, Look Up, peaked at #1 on the Billboard Top Heatseekers chart. The hip hop/post-hardcore/alternative hip hop artists' most pop-punk album is the fourth studio album, Internet Killed the Rockstar.
Mojiganga	Medellín, Colombia	1995–present	A ska punk band.
Mojo Nixon	Danville, Virginia, US	1985–2024	A rockabilly/cowpunk/psychobilly artist.
The Molotovs	London, UK	2020–present	A punk rock band.
Mondo Generator	Los Angeles, California USA	1997–present	An alternative metal/punk rock/stoner rock/hard rock/alternative rock band.
Monsula	San Francisco Bay Area, California, US	1988–1993	A pop punk band.
The Moondogs	Northern Ireland, UK	1979–present	A classic punk rock/power pop band.
Morning Glory	New York, New York, US	2001–present	A punk rock/crust punk band.
Moss Icon	Annapolis, Maryland, US	1986–1991, 2001, 2007–present	A pioneer of emo. The band also plays post-hardcore and hardcore punk.
Moskwa	Poland	1983–1991, 2001–present	A hardcore punk band.
Motion City Soundtrack	Minneapolis, Minnesota, US	1997–2016, 2019–present	An alternative rock/pop punk/emo/power pop/pop rock/indie rock band.
The Movielife	New York, New York, US	1997–2003, 2010–2011, 2014–present	A melodic hardcore/pop punk/emo band.
The Mr. T Experience	Berkeley, California, US	1985–present	A punk rock/pop punk band.
MU330	St. Louis, Missouri, US	1988–present	A ska punk/punk rock/indie rock band.
Much the Same	Chicago, Illinois, US	1999–2007, 2011, 2015–2024	A punk rock/pop punk/skate punk/melodic hardcore band.
Mucky Pup	Bergenfield, New Jersey, US	1986–1996, 1999–2003, 2009–2014	A crossover thrash/hardcore punk band.
Mudhoney	Seattle, Washington, US	1988–present	An alternative rock/grunge/garage punk band.
The Muffs	Los Angeles, California, US	1991–1999, 2002–2004, 2012–2019	A power pop/garage punk band.
Müllstation	Eisleben, Sachsen-Anhalt, East Germany	1980–1989, 1991–present	A Deutschpunk band.
Murderdolls	Hollywood, California, US	2002–2004, 2010–2011	A horror punk/glam metal band.
The Murder Junkies	New York, New York, US	1990–1999, 2003–present	A hardcore punk band.
Murphy's Law	New York, New York, US	1982–present	A hardcore punk/skate punk band.
The Muslims	Durham, North Carolina, US	2017–present	A left-wing political punk band.
Mustard Plug	Grand Rapids, Michigan, US	1991–present	A ska punk/pop punk band.
Mutiny	Melbourne, Victoria, Australia	1991–present	A folk punk band.
MxPx	Bremerton, Washington, US	1992–present	A Christian punk rock band consisting of three members, who were all born in 1976.
My Chemical Romance	Newark, New Jersey, US	2001–2013, 2019–present	The band is considered to be one of the most influential rock groups of the 2000s and a major act in the pop punk and emo genres.

== N ==
Band name	Origin	Years active	Brief summary
Na Gathan	Isle of Skye, Scotland, UK	2007–present	An indie rock/Scottish Gaelic punk/garage punk band.
Nailpin	Belgium	2004–2009	A pop rock/pop punk that has opened up for several notable acts such as Avril Lavigne and Bon Jovi.
Naked Raygun	Chicago, Illinois, US	1980–1992, 2006–present	A punk rock/post-hardcore/post-punk band.
Naked Violence	Portland, Oregon, US	1991–2004	A punk rock band.
Napalm Death	Birmingham, England, UK	1981–present	An influential hardcore punk/crust punk/death metal/anarcho-punk band that is credited with founding grindcore.
Nastasee	Bergen County, New Jersey, US	1996–1998	A hardcore punk band.
The Nation Of Ulysses	Washington, D.C., US	1988–1992	A post-hardcore/hardcore punk band.
National Razor	Baltimore, Maryland, US	1998–present	A new wave/hardcore punk band.
Nausea	New York, New York, US	1985–1992	A crust punk band.
Neck	London, England, UK	1994–present	A Celtic punk/folk punk/street punk band.
Neck Deep	Wrexham, Wales, UK	2012–present	The pop punk band won Best Live Band at the Alternative Press Music Awards (2016). The band's song "In Bloom" won Best Single at the Kerrang! Awards (2018).
Necros	Maumee, Ohio, US	1978–2014	A hardcore punk/post-hardcore band.
The Need	Olympia, Washington, US	1996–2001, 2010, 2013	A queercore/post-punk/art rock/garage rock/experimental rock band.
The Needles	Aberdeen, Scotland, UK	1998–present	A punk rock band.
Negative Approach	Detroit, Michigan, US	1981–1984, 2006–present	A hardcore punk band.
Negative FX	Boston, Massachusetts, US	1981–1982	A hardcore punk/thrashcore band.
Negative Trend	San Francisco, California, US	1977–1979, 2008–2010	A hardcore punk band.
Negazione	Turin, Italy	1983–1992	A hardcore punk band.
Nekromantix	Copenhagen, Denmark	1989–present	A psychobilly band whose bassist, Kim Nekroman, is the guitarist for HorrorPops.
Neon Hearts	Wolverhampton, England, UK	1977–1981, 2013–Present	A classic punk rock band.
Nerf Herder	Santa Barbara, California, US	1994–2003, 2006–present	A pop punk/geek rock/alternative rock band best known for playing the theme song for the television show, Buffy the Vampire Slayer.
The Nerve Agents	San Francisco, California, US	1998–2002	A hardcore punk/horror punk band.
Nervous Gender	Los Angeles, California, US	1978–1988, 1990–1991, 2007–present	An electronic rock/industrial band that is credited as one of the original innovators of synthpunk.
The Network	Oakland, California, US	2003–2005, 2020–2021	A new wave/pop punk/synth-pop band.
Neurosis	Oakland, California, US	1985–2019, 2022	A post-metal/sludge metal band that began as a crust punk band.
Neurotic Outsiders	UK, US	1995–1997, 1999, 2006	A punk rock/hard rock supergroup featuring Steve Jones of the Sex Pistols, Matt Sorum and Duff McKagan of Guns N' Roses and John Taylor of Duran Duran.
New Found Glory	Coral Springs, Florida, US	1997–present	An influential pop punk band that also plays alternative rock/melodic hardcore/punk rock. The band is also known as NFG, A New Found Glory, and International Superheroes of Hardcore.
New Regime	Los Angeles, California, US	1979–1985	A hardcore punk band.
New Mexican Disaster Squad	Orlando, Florida, US	1999–2008	A hardcore punk band.
New Model Army	Bradford, West Yorkshire, England, UK	1980–present	A post punk/folk rock/gothic rock band that began as a punk rock band.
New York Dolls	New York, New York, US	1971–1976, 2004–2011	A hard rock/proto-punk/glam punk band that is often cited as one of the founding punk rock bands.
Newtown Neurotics	Harlow, Essex, England, UK	1979–1988, 2006–present	A classic punk rock band.
The Nils	Montreal, Quebec, Canada	1978–1988, 1992–1994, 2003–2004, 2010–present	A classic punk rock band.
Nip Drivers	Torrance, California, US	1980–2000	A hardcore punk/melodic hardcore/pop punk band.
The Nips	London, England, UK	1976–1981, 2008–2009	A punk rock/psychobilly band that incorporated elements of garage rock, rockabilly and power pop. This was the first band of The Pogues member, Shane Macgowan. The band is also known as the Nipple Erectors.
Nirvana	Seattle, Washington, US	1987–1994 (Kurt Cobain's death)	A popular band in the grunge movement alongside Pearl Jam, Alice in Chains, and Soundgarden.
The Nixe	Utrecht, Netherlands	1979–1984	A Dutch punk/punk rock band.
No Comment	North Hollywood, California, US	1987–1993	A powerviolence band.
No Doubt	Anaheim, California, US	1986–2005, 2008–2015, 2024–present	A ska punk/ska/pop rock/new wave/alternative rock/pop punk/reggae band that incorporated elements of dancehall.
No Innocent Victim	San Diego, California, US	1992–2002, 2004–2017	A hardcore punk/metalcore band.
No Remorse	London, England, UK	1986–1996	A Neo-Nazi Rock Against Communism punk rock/Oi! band.
No Swastikas (The Redskins)	York, England, UK	1982–1986	A left-wing punk rock/soul/rockabilly/pop/anarcho-punk band.
No Torso	Oslo, Norway	2003–2009	A ska/indie rock/punk rock band.
No Trigger	Massachusetts, US	2001–present	A punk rock/pop punk/melodic hardcore/hardcore punk band.
No Use for a Name	Sunnyvale, California, US	1986–2012, 2015, 2016	A punk rock/pop punk/skate punk/hardcore punk/melodic hardcore band.
No Warning	Toronto, Ontario, Canada	1998–2005, 2013–present	A hardcore punk band.
NOFX	Los Angeles, California, US	1983–present	A punk rock band that adds elements of ska and pop to their work. Frontman Fat Mike is also the founder of their current label Fat Wreck Chords.
Noise Addict	Bondi Beach, Sydney, New South Wales, Australia	1993–1996, 2009	An alternative rock/indie pop band.
Noise By Numbers	Chicago, Illinois, US	2008–present	A pop punk band.
Nomeansno	Victoria, British Columbia, Canada	1979–2016	A progressive punk rock/post-hardcore band. Also, members of the band, The Hanson Brothers.
None More Black	New Jersey, US	2000–present	A punk rock/melodic hardcore band.
Normahl	Stuttgart, Germany	1978–1996, 2002–present	A Deutschpunk band.
The Nosebleeds	Wythenshawe, Manchester, England, UK	1976–1978, 2014–present	An early punk rock band notable for the later successes of its members, Billy Duffy (the Cult), Vini Reilly (the Durutti Column), and Toby Toman (Primal Scream).
Not By Choice	Ajax, Ontario, Canada	1997–2008, 2017–present	The punk rock/pop punk/alternative rock band earned a MuchMusic Video Award for "Best Independent Video" ("Now That You Are Leaving") and a CASBY Award for "Best Independent Album" ("Maybe One Day").
Notsensibles	Burnley, Lancashire, England, UK	1978–1982, 1996, 2005–present	A classic punk rock band.

== O ==
Band name	Origin	Years active	Brief summary
The OBGMs	Toronto, Canada	2007-present	A Juno Award shortlisted punk rock band.
The Odorants	Nurmo, Finland	1995–present	A punk rock band.
Off!	Los Angeles, California, US	2009–2024	A hardcore punk supergroup formed by members of Black Flag, Circle Jerks, Redd Kross, Burning Brides, Rocket from the Crypt and Hot Snakes.
Off with Their Heads	Minneapolis, Minnesota, US	2002–present	A punk rock/melodic hardcore/hardcore punk band.
The Offspring	Garden Grove, California, US	1984–present	A punk rock/skate punk/pop punk/melodic hardcore/hardcore punk/alternative rock band that has been very popular since the release of their 1994 album, Smash.
Oi Polloi	Edinburgh, Scotland, UK	1981–present	An anarcho-punk/Oi!/hardcore punk/crust punk/Scottish Gaelic punk band.
Old Man Markley	Los Angeles, California, US	2007–2015	A punk rock/bluegrass band.
One Ok Rock	Tokyo, Japan	2005–present	An alternative rock/emo/post-hardcore/pop punk/power pop/post-grunge that is one of the most popular Japanese rock groups.
Omega Tribe	Barnet, London, England, UK	1981–1988, 1995, 2016–present	An anarcho-punk/post-punk band.
One Bad Pig	Austin, Texas, US	1985–1994, 2000, 2002, 2005, 2016–present	A Christian punk/crossover thrash band.
One-Eyed Doll	Austin, Texas, US	2006–2018	A gothic rock/punk rock/heavy metal/hard rock band.
One Hit Wonder	Long Beach, California, US	1993–1999	A punk rock/power pop band.
One King Down	Albany, New York, US	1994–2001, 2006, 2018, 2023	A hardcore punk/metalcore band.
One Man Army	San Francisco, California, US	1996–2005, 2011–present	A punk rock band.
One Shot Left	Medicine Hat, Alberta, Canada	1997–present	A punk rock/skate punk/alternative rock band.
One Way System	Fleetwood, Lancashire, England, UK	1979–1986, 1995–present	A punk rock/street punk/Oi! band.
Only Crime	USA	2003–present	A punk rock/melodic hardcore band that was formed Good Riddance's singer, Russ Rankin and Bane's guitarist, Aaron Dalbec. Rise Against's guitarist, Zach Blair was a member of the band from 2003 to 2007.
The Only Ones	South London, London, England, UK	1976–1982, 2007–2017, 2023–present	A power pop/new wave/punk rock/indie rock band.
Operation Ivy	Berkeley, California, US	1987–1989	A ska punk/punk rock/hardcore punk band. Tim Armstrong and Matt Freeman were in this band before they formed Rancid.
The Oppressed	Cardiff, Wales, UK	1981–1984, 1994–1996, 1998–2006, 2009–2016, 2020–present	An Oi!/punk rock band.
Orange 9mm	New York, New York, US	1994–2000, 2024–present	An alternative metal/post-hardcore/rap metal band.
Orlík	Prague, Czech Republic	1988–1991	A punk rock/Oi! band.
Osaka Popstar	New York, New York, US	2006–present	A punk rock supergroup with members of The Misfits and Black Flag with a major influence in anime.
Osker	Los Angeles, California, US	1998–2002	A punk rock band that appeared in the movie Crazy/Beautiful (2001), performing the songs "Fuck Me" and "Alright".
Östro 430	Düsseldorf, Germany/Hamburg, Germany	1979–1984, 2019–present	A Deutschpunk/German punk/Neue Deutsche Welle band.
Outbreak	Maine, US	2002–2011	A hardcore punk band.
The Outcasts	Belfast, Northern Ireland, UK	1977–1985	A classic punk rock band.
Over My Dead Body	San Diego County, California, US	2000–2004	A hardcore punk band.
Oxymoron	Germany	1992–2002, 2006	An Oi!/street punk/punk rock band.

== P ==
Band name	Origin	Years active	Brief summary
The Pagans	Cleveland, Ohio, US	1977–1979, 1982–1983, 1986–1989, 2014–2017	A classic punk rock band.
Pain (Salvo)	Tuscaloosa, Alabama, US	1994–2000, 2019–present	An energetic pop punk/punk rock/ska band that often makes use of horn instruments.
Paint It Black	Philadelphia, Pennsylvania, US	2002–present	A hardcore punk/punk rock/melodic hardcore band.
Painted Thin	Winnipeg, Manitoba, Canada	1994–1999	A hardcore punk band.
Panda	Monterrey, Nuevo León, México	1996–2016	An alternative rock/pop punk/punk rock/emo/skate punk/hard rock/post hardcore/hardcore punk band.
Panic! at the Disco	Las Vegas, Nevada, US	2004–2023	A pop rock/pop/baroque pop/electropop/alternative rock/emo pop/pop punk band.
Pankrti	Ljubljana, Slovenia	1977–1987, 2007–present	The first punk rock band in Slovenia whose name means "The Bastards".
Panx Romana	Athens, Greece	1979–present	An anarcho-punk band.
Paraf	Rijeka, Croatia	1976–1986, 1994, 2003, 2008	A punk rock/new wave/post-punk/gothic rock band.
Paramore	Franklin, Tennessee, US	2004–present	A female fronted pop punk/emo/pop rock/alternative rock/power pop/new wave band.
Paranoid Visions	Dublin, Ireland	1982–1992, 1996, 2001, 2005–present	An anarcho-punk band. Ireland's longest running punk rock band, releasing their music through their own label, F.O.A.D.
Parasites	Livingston, New Jersey, US	1986–2003, 2006–present	A punk rock/pop punk band.
Partibrejkers	Belgrade, Serbia	1982–2016, 2018–present	A garage rock/rhythm and blues/punk blues/blues rock/hard rock/garage rock band.
The Partisans	Bridgend, Wales, UK	1978–1984, late 1990s–present	A hardcore punk band.
Pascow	Gimbweiler, Germany	1998–present	A Deutschpunk band.
The Patti Smith Group (Patti Smith)	New York, New York, US	1973–1979, 1988, 1996–present	A punk rock/art punk/proto-punk/art rock/garage rock/pop rock band.
Pegboy	Chicago, Illinois, US	1990–present	A punk rock band.
Pekinška Patka	Novi Sad, Vojvodina, Serbia	1978–1981, 2008, 2010–2012, 2021–present	initially a punk rock band, moved to post-punk and dark wave in early 1980s.
Penetration	Ferryhill, County Durham, England, UK	1976–1980, 2001–present	A classic punk rock band.
Pennywise	Hermosa Beach, California, US	1988–present	A punk rock/skate punk/hardcore punk/melodic hardcore band that has achieved some success since signing to their longtime home, Epitaph, in 1990.
Pere Ubu	Cleveland, Ohio, US	1975–1982, 1987–present	An art punk/post-punk/art rock/new wave/proto-punk/industrial rock band.
La Pestilencia	Bogotá, Colombia	1986–present	A hardcore punk/alternative metal/punk rock/alternative rock/heavy metal band.
Peter Pan Speedrock	Eindhoven, Netherlands	1997–2016	A punk rock/hard rock/psychobilly band.
Peter and the Test Tube Babies	Peacehaven, East Sussex, England, UK	1978–present	A punk rock/Oi!/punk pathetique band.
Pg. 99	Sterling, Virginia, US	1997–2003, 2011, 2017, 2023	A hardcore punk band that is considered to be one of the first screamo bands.
Phinius Gage	Brighton, East Sussex, England, UK	2001–2008	A punk rock/skate punk/melodic hardcore bands.
The Piass	Sapporo, Japan	1990–1995, 1998–present	A hardcore punk/thrashcore/deathcore/metalcore band.
Picture Frame Seduction	Haverfordwest, Wales, UK	1979–1987, 1999–present	A hardcore punk band.
Pidżama Porno	Poznań, Pila, Poland	1987–1990, 1995–2007, 2015–present	A punk rock/alternative rock band.
Pimpbot	Honolulu, Hawaii, US	2001–2015	A rock/ska/reggae band.
Pinkerton Thugs	Kennebunk, Maine, US	1994–2000, 2008–2012	A melodic punk rock band.
Pink Lincolns	Tampa, Florida, US	1986–present	A punk rock band.
Pinhead Gunpowder	East Bay, California, US	1991–2010, 2024–present	A punk rock/hardcore punk band.
Pipes and Pints	Prague, Czech Republic	2006–present	A Celtic punk/punk rock/rock band.
The Piranhas	Brighton, England, UK	1977–1982	A ska punk band.
Pitchblende	Washington, D.C., US	1991–1995	An art punk band.
Pivit	San Diego, California, US	1994–2003, 2008–2009, 2015–present	A punk rock/melodic hardcore band.
Pixies	Boston, Massachusetts, US	1986–1993, 2004–present	An alternative rock/indie rock/noise pop/punk rock/surf band.
Pkew pkew pkew	Toronto, Ontario, Canada	2013–present	A punk rock/pop punk band. In July 2020, it was announced that their song "Mid 20s Skateboarder" is in the new Tony Hawk's Pro Skater 1 + 2 game.
The Plague	London, England, UK	1976–1981, 2005–present	A classic punk rock band.
Plasmatics	New York, New York, US	1977–1983, 1987–1988	A hardcore punk/heavy metal/biker metal band that is considered to be one of the first shock rock acts in the punk rock scene.
The Plugz	Los Angeles, California, US	1977–1984	A punk rock/rock band.
The Pogues	King's Cross, London, England, UK	1982–1996, 2001–2014	A Celtic punk/folk punk band.
Pointed Sticks	Vancouver, British Columbia, Canada	1978–1981, 2006–2012, 2015–present	A punk rock/new wave band.
Point of No Return	São Paulo, Brazil	1996–2006, 2024–present	A metalcore/hardcore punk/beatdown hardcore band.
Point of Recognition	Inland Empire, California, US	1998–2002, 2007	A hardcore punk/Christian hardcore/Christian metal/metalcore band.
Poison Girls	Brighton, East Sussex, England, UK	1976–1987	An anarcho-punk band.
Poison Idea	Portland, Oregon, US	1980–1993, 1998–2017, 2018–2019	A hardcore punk band.
La Polla Records	Salvatierra, Basque Country, Spain	1979–2003, 2019–2021	A hardcore punk band that is considered to be one of the most influential Spanish punk rock bands.
Political Asylum	Stirling, Scotland, UK	1982–1989, 1991–1993	An anarcho-punk/hardcore punk/melodic hardcore/punk rock bands.
Pollen	Tempe, Arizona, US/Pittsburgh, Pennsylvania, US	1993–2001	A power pop/pop punk band that released four albums and two split records over their eight years together.
Polysics	Tokyo, Japan	1997–present	A new wave/synth-pop/art pop/post-punk revival/electronic rock/hardcore punk/geek rock band.
Porcos Cegos	Barueri, Brazil	1993–2005, 2006–present	A punk rock band.
Pornofilmy	Dubna, Russia	2008–present	A punk rock/grunge band.
Poslednie Tanki V Parizhe	Saint-Petersburg, Russia	1996–present	A punk rock band.
Post Regiment	Warsaw, Poland	1986–2000	A hardcore punk band.
Potshot	Tokyo, Japan	1995–2005, 2015	A ska punk/punk rock band.
Pour Habit	Long Beach, California, US	2004–2018	A punk rock/melodic hardcore band.
Powerman 5000	Boston, Massachusetts, US	1991–present	A alternative metal/electronic rock/industrial metal/industrial rock/nu metal/punk rock band.
Los Prisioneros	San Miguel, Santiago Metropolitan Region, Chile	1982–1992, 2001–2006	A new wave/synth-pop/punk rock/rockabilly/ska band.
Prljavo Kazalište	Zagreb, Croatia	1977–present	Initially a punk rock and new wave band, the group later moved to more conventional rock sound.
The Professionals	London, England, UK	1979–1982, 2015–2024	A classic punk rock band.
Project X	New York, New York, US	1987	A hardcore punk/youth crew band.
The Proletariat	Fall River, Massachusetts, US	1980–1985, 2016–present	A hardcore punk/post-punk/noise rock/art punk band.
Propagandhi	Portage la Prairie, Manitoba, Canada	1986–present	An anarchist punk rock/skate punk/heavy metal/pop punk/melodic hardcore band.
Pro-Pain	New York, New York, US	1991–present	A groove metal/thrash metal/hardcore punk band.
Propeller	Tallinn, Estonia	1980–present	A classic punk rock band.
Proud Scum	Auckland, New Zealand	1979–1981, 2008–present	A hardcore punk band that has been covered by The Lemonheads.
Psihomodo Pop	Zagreb, Croatia	1982–present	A punk rock/garage rock/alternative rock band.
Pueblo Criminal	Zurich, Switzerland	2006–present	A ska/punk rock band with reggae and Latin music influences.
Pulley	Simi Valley, California, US	1994–present	A punk rock/skate punk/melodic hardcore band.
Puncture	London, England, UK	1976–1978	A classic punk rock band.
The Punkles	Hamburg, Germany	1998–2006	A punk rock band.
Punkreas	Parabiago, Italy	1989–present	A ska punk/alternative rock/punk rock band.
Pussy Riot	Moscow, Russia	2011–present	An all female pop/punk rock/hardcore punk/Oi! band.
PVC	Berlin, Germany	1977–1984, 1988–1991, 2005–2012	A Deutschpunk band.
Pygmy Lush	Sterling, Virginia, US	2004–present	A folk/experimental/hardcore punk band.

== Q ==
Band name	Origin	Years active	Brief summary
The Quails	San Francisco, California, US	1999–2003	A punk rock band.
The Queers	Portsmouth, New Hampshire, US	1981–1984, 1986–1988, 1990–present	A punk rock/pop punk band highly influenced by the Ramones.
Quit	Miami, Florida, US	1988–1996, 1999, 2002, 2015	A punk rock band.

== R ==
Band name	Origin	Years active	Brief summary
The Rabble	Auckland, New Zealand	2001–present	A hardcore punk band.
Rabid	Leicester, England, UK	1979–1986, 2013	A classic punk rock band.
Racetraitor	Chicago, Illinois, US	1996–1999, 2016–present	A hardcore punk/metalcore/grindcore band.
Radical Dance Faction	Hungerford, Berkshire, England, UK	1987–1995, 2006–present	A punk rock/dub/ska band.
Radio Birdman	Sydney, Australia	1974–1978, 1996–2008, 2014–present	A punk rock/garage rock/proto-punk/surf band.
Raimundos	Brasília, Federal District, Brazil	1987–1990, 1992–2001, 2001–present	A hardcore punk/alternative metal/punk rock band.
The Raincoats	Crouch End, London, England, UK	1977–1984, 1993–present	A post-punk/experimental rock/reggae band.
Raised Fist	Luleå, Norrbotton, Sweden	1993–present	A hardcore punk band that got its name from the lyrics of Rage Against the Machine's song, "Know Your Enemy".
R.A.M.B.O.	Philadelphia, Pennsylvania, US	1999–2007, 2019–present	A hardcore punk/thrashcore/crust punk band.
Ramones	Forest Hills, Queens, New York, New York, US	1974–1996	A pop punk band that is often regarded as one of the first punk rock groups to come out of the US.
Rancid	Berkeley, California, US	1991–present	A punk rock/ska punk/street punk band that is one of the bands that has been credited with reviving mainstream popular interest in punk rock in the US during the mid-1990s. Band members have been involved in numerous other bands.
Random Hand	Keighley, West Yorkshire, England, UK	2002–present	A punk rock/ska punk/hardcore punk/heavy metal band.
Randy	Hortlax, Sweden	1992–present	A punk rock/garage punk/ska punk/skate punk band.
Rashit	Istanbul, Turkey	1993–present	A band that is considered to be the first major Turkish punk rock band.
Rasta Knast	Celle, Germany	1997–present	A Deutschpunk/trallpunk band.
Ratos de Porão	São Paulo, Brazil	1981–present	A crossover thrash/thrash metal/hardcore punk/D-beat band whose lead singer is João Gordo, a popular VJ for MTV Brasil.
Rattus	Vilppula, Finland	1978–1988, 2001–present	A hardcore punk/crust punk band.
Raw Power	Reggio Emilia, Italy	1981–present	A hardcore punk/crossover thrash band.
Razors in the Night	Boston, Massachusetts, US	2009–present	A hardcore punk/Oi!/punk rock band.
Razzia	Hamburg, Germany	1979–1992, 1993–2004, 2008–present	A Deutschpunk/post-punk/punk rock band.
Reach the Sky	Boston, Massachusetts, US	1997–2003	A hardcore punk band.
Reagan Youth	Forest Hills, Queens, New York, New York, US	1980–1990, 2006–present	A hardcore punk/anarcho-punk band that is known for their extreme satire of racism.
The Real McKenzies	Vancouver, British Columbia, Canada	1992–present	A Scottish-influenced Celtic punk/folk punk band.
The Reatards	Memphis, Tennessee, US	1995–1999, 2005–2006	A garage punk/lo-fi band. This was the first project of musician, Jay Reatard.
Redemption 87	East Bay, California, US	1995–1999, 2004	A hardcore punk band.
Redd Kross	Hawthorne, California, US	1980–1997, 2004–present	An alternative rock/power pop/punk rock/pop punk band.
Red Alert	Sunderland, England, UK	1979–present	An Oi! band.
Red City Radio	Oklahoma City, Oklahoma, US	2007–2023	A punk rock/alternative rock/pop punk band that has released four albums, three eps and three split records.
Red Lights Flash	Graz, Austria	1997–2010	A melodic punk rock band.
Red London	Sunderland, England, UK	1981–2002, 2018–present	An Oi!/punk rock band.
Reel Big Fish	Huntington Beach, California, US	1991–present	A ska punk/third-wave ska band.
Refused	Umeå, Sweden	1991–1998, 2012, 2014–present	A post-hardcore/hardcore punk band.
Relient K	Canton, Ohio, US	1998–present	An alternative rock/Christian alternative rock/pop punk band that plays a blend of punk rock and power pop.
Reset	Montreal, Quebec, Canada	1993–present	A punk rock/melodic hardcore band formed when members were only 13-years-old. The original vocalist and drummer are now in Simple Plan.
The Restarts	London, England, UK	1995–present	A street punk/hardcore punk band.
Re-Volts	San Francisco, California, US	2007–present	A punk rock band.
The Rezillos	Edinburgh, Scotland, UK	1976–1978, 2001–present	A punk rock/new wave band.
RF7	California, US	1979–present	A hardcore punk/rock band.
Rhino 39	Los Angeles, California, US	late 1970s–1980s, through late 1990s, 2014–present	A hardcore punk band.
Ricanstruction	New York, New York, US	1990s–2006	A Puerto Rican punk rock/hip hop/salsa/jazz/reggae band.
Rich Kids	London, England, UK	1977–1979, 2010–2019	A punk rock/power pop/new wave band.
Rich Kids on LSD	Montecito, California, US	1982–1989, 1992–1996, 2002–2006, 2024–present	A punk rock/skate punk/hardcore punk band, associated with the "Nardcore" scene, whose career has been slowed down by members involved in their projects.
Riddlin' Kids	Austin, Texas, US	1999–2010	A pop punk/punk rock band whose song "I Feel Fine" was featured in the movie Orange County (2002). The band's song "Pick Up the Pieces" was featured in the soundtrack for the video game ATV Offroad Fury 2 (2002) and in the movie Extreme Ops (2002).
Ringworm	Cleveland, Ohio, US	1989–1994, 1999–present	A metalcore/hardcore punk/thrash metal band.
RIOT 111	New Zealand	1981–1984	An anarcho-punk band.
Riot Squad	Mansfield, Nottinghamshire, England, UK	1981–1984, 2003–present	A punk rock band.
Rise Against	Chicago, Illinois, US	1999–present	A melodic hardcore/punk rock/hardcore punk band that has been very popular since signing to a major label.
Rise and Fall	Ghent, Belgium	2002–2012	A hardcore punk/metalcore/crust punk band.
Rites of Spring	Washington, D.C., US	1983–1986	A hardcore punk/emo/punk rock/post-hardcore band that is sometimes cited as the founders of "emotive hardcore".
The Rivals	Ramsgate, Kent, England, UK	1976–1981	A classic punk rock band.
Riverboat Gamblers	Denton, Texas, US	1997–present	A punk rock/garage rock/alternative rock band.
River City High	Richmond, Virginia, US	1999–present	A hard rock/emo/punk rock/pop punk band.
Riverdales	Chicago, Illinois, US	1994–1997, 2003, 2008–2011	A punk rock/pop punk band.
Rocket from the Crypt	San Diego, California, US	1990–2005, 2011, 2013–present	A punk rock/rock and roll band whose name was inspired by the 1970s band, Rocket from the Tombs.
Rocket from the Tombs	Cleveland, Ohio, US	1974–1975, 2003–2017	A proto-punk/garage rock/punk rock/hard rock band.
Roger Miret and the Disasters	USA	1999–present	A street punk/punk rock band.
Rollins Band	Van Nuys, Los Angeles, California, US	1987–1997, 1999–2003, 2006	An alternative metal/post-hardcore/hard rock/funk metal band.
Rorschach	New Jersey, US	1989–1993, 2009–2012	A hardcore punk/metalcore/mathcore/powerviolence band.
Rubella Ballet	London, England, UK	1979–1991, 2000–present	An anarcho-punk/post-punk/gothic rock band.
Rudi	Belfast, Northern Ireland, UK	1975–1983	A punk rock/pop punk/power pop band.
Rudimentary Peni	England, UK	1980–present	An anarcho-punk/hardcore punk/art punk band.
The Rudiments	San Francisco, California, US	1990–1996	A skacore/ska punk band.
Rufio	Rancho Cucamonga, California, US	2000–2007, 2010–2012, 2015	A pop punk/skate punk/emo/melodic hardcore band that took their name from the character Rufio, leader of the Lost Boys in the absence of Peter Pan, in the 1991 movie, Hook.
Ruin	Philadelphia, Pennsylvania, US	1980–1986, 1996–2016	A punk rock/psychedelic rock/hard rock band.
The Runaways	Los Angeles, California, US	1975–1979	A teenage all female hard rock/glam rock/punk rock/heavy metal/glam punk band that included a young Joan Jett and Lita Ford.
Runner Runner	Huntington Beach, California, US	2008–present	A pop rock/power pop band. Their national television debut was on Jimmy Kimmel Live! on July 20, 2010. They were also featured on the Late Show with David Letterman on September 27, 2010.
The Ruts	London, England, UK	1977–1983, 2007–present	A punk rock/reggae rock/ska punk band.
RVIVR	Olympia, Washington, US	2008–2018	A punk rock/melodic hardcore/pop punk band. Mattie Joe Canino (Latterman/Tender Defender) and Erica Freas vocally ensure the message of gender and sociopolitical equality is at the heart of what the band does, in both songwriting and interviews.
Rx Bandits	Seal Beach, California, US	1995–2011	A ska punk/progressive rock/post-hardcore/reggae/alternative rock band.

== S ==
Band name	Origin	Years active	Brief summary
Los Saicos	Lince, Lima, Peru	1964–1966, 2006–2011, 2013–present	A garage rock/surf band that is considered by some people to be one of the first proto-punk bands.
Saint Alvia	Burlington, Ontario, Canada	2005–2013	A rock/punk rock/reggae band with former members of Boys Night Out and Jersey.
The Sainte Catherines	Montreal, Quebec, Canada	1999–2012	A hardcore punk band.
The Saints	Brisbane, Queensland, Australia	1973–2022, 2024	A classic punk rock/alternative rock/pop rock band.
The Salads	Newmarket, Ontario, Canada	1993–2016	A ska punk/reggae fusion/punk rock band.
Salem	Southampton, Hampshire, England, UK	2019–present	A punk rock/horror punk/pop punk band.
Les Sales Majestés	Paris, France	1992–present	A political punk rock band.
Sam Black Church	Boston, Massachusetts, US	1988–2000, 2007, 2013, 2014, 2016–present	A hardcore punk/alternative metal band.
Samhain	New Jersey, United States	1983–1987, 1999, 2011, 2012, 2014	A death rock/horror punk/heavy metal/gothic rock band. The short-lived project was formed by Glenn Danzig after the 1983 demise of The Misfits. The project changed its name to Danzig in 1987.
Samiam	Berkeley, California, US	1988–present	A punk rock/hardcore punk/pop punk/melodic hardcore/emo band.
Satanic Surfers	Lund, Sweden	1989–2007, 2014–present	A skate punk band.
Savages	London, England, UK	2011–2017	A post-punk revival/noise rock/alternative rock band.
Save Ferris	Orange County, California, US	1995–2003, 2013–present	A ska punk band.
Saves the Day	Princeton, New Jersey, US	1997–present	An emo/pop punk/melodic hardcore/punk rock/hardcore punk band.
The Scarred	Anaheim, California, US	2003–2014	A garage punk band.
Scaterd Few	Burbank, California, US	1983–1985, 1989–1995, 1997–1998, 2001–2002	A punk rock/Christian punk band.
Scatterbox	Coeur d'Alene, Idaho, US	2001-present	A punk rock/hardcore punk/thrash band. The longest existing punk band from Idaho to date.
The Scenics	Toronto, Ontario, Canada	1976–1982, 2008–present	A post-punk/art rock band.
The Schizo's	Emmen, Netherlands	1985–1988, 2008–present	A punk rock band.
Schleim-Keim	Erfurt, Thuringia, East Germany	1980–1996, 2008–present	A Deutschpunk/hardcore punk band.
Schwartzeneggar	England, UK	1992-1995	A punk rock band featuring Steve Ignorant of Crass and members of Thatcher On Acid and Conflict.
Scowl	Santa Cruz, California, US	2019–present	An up-and-coming American hardcore punk band fronted by green-haired singer Kat Moss.
Scream	Alexandria, Virginia, US	1981–1990, 1993, 1994, 1996, 2009–present	A hardcore punk/post-hardcore band.
The Screamers	Los Angeles, California, US	1975–1981	An influential synthpunk band that never released an album.
Screaming Dead	Cheltenham, Gloucestershire, England, UK	1980–1985, 1997–1999, 2014–present	A horror punk band.
Screaming Females	New Brunswick, New Jersey, US	2005-2023	A punk rock/alternative rock band fronted by Marissa Paternoster.
Screeching Weasel	Prospect Heights, Illinois, US	1986–1989, 1991–1994, 1996–2001, 2004, 2009–present	A satirical punk rock/pop punk/skate punk/hardcore punk band.
Screw 32	Berkeley, California, US	1992–1997	A punk rock band.
Scuba Dice	County Kilkenny, Ireland/County Wexford, Ireland	2003–2011	A pop punk/punk rock band.
Scum	Norway	2002–2005	A hardcore punk/black metal band.
Seaway	Oakville, Ontario, Canada	2011–present	An alternative rock/pop punk/emo band. The band's second album was listed at number 32 on Rock Sound's top 50 releases of 2015. The band's third album was listed at number 12 of Rock Sound's top 50 releases of 2017.
Seaweed	Tacoma, Washington, US	1989–1999, 2007–2014	A punk rock/alternative rock/post-hardcore band.
The Secretions	Sacramento, California, US	1991–2016	A punk rock/pop punk band.
Sedes	Wrocław, Poland	1980–present	A classic punk rock band.
Sektor Gaza	Voronezh, Russia	1987–2000, 2000–2006, 2017–present	A punk rock/Russian rock/pop rock/folk rock/alternative metal/rap metal/comedy rock/hard rock band.
Senior Discount	Providence, Rhode Island, US	2004–present	A punk rock/pop punk/ska punk band.
Senses Fail	Ridgewood, New Jersey, US	2001–present	A band that is primarily plays post-hardcore/emo/metalcore/screamo but also plays pop punk.
Septic Tank	Coventry, England, UK	1994–1995, 2013–present	A hardcore punk/crust punk/anarcho-punk/thrashcore band.
Serious Drinking	Norwich, England, UK	1981–mid-1980s, and intermittently since	A classic punk rock band known for their humorous songs about things such as football and drinking.
Serpenteens	New York, New York, US	1995–present	A psychobilly/horror punk band.
Set Your Goals	Orinda, California, US	2004–2013, 2015–present	A melodic hardcore/pop punk band.
Superchick	Chicago, Illinois, US	1999–2013, 2016	A contemporary Christian/pop punk/rap rock/hard rock/pop/contemporary R&B band.
Sex Pistols	London, England, UK	1975–1978, 1996, 2002–2003, 2007–2008, 2024–present	A pioneer of the punk rock scene, who released the album Never Mind the Bollocks, Here's the Sex Pistols, which many of today's bands cite as their main influence.
Shaila	Buenos Aires, Argentina	1994–present	A rock/punk rock/melodic hardcore band.
Shai Hulud	Pompano Beach, Florida, US	1995–present	A metalcore/hardcore punk/melodic hardcore band.
Sham 69	Hersham, Surrey, England, UK	1975–1979, 1987–present	A very influential Oi! band named after faded graffiti promoting the local soccer team.
Sharks	Leamington Spa, Warwickshire, England, UK	2007–2013	A punk rock/alternative rock band.
Shattered Faith	Southern California, US	1978–1982, 2004–present	A classic punk rock band.
She Devils	Argentina	1995–present	An all female queercore/punk rock band.
Sheer Terror	New York, New York, US	1984–1998, 2004, 2010–present	A hardcore punk/crossover thrash band.
Shelter	New York, New York, US	1991–present	A melodic hardcore/hardcore punk/post-hardcore/Krishnacore band.
Shonen Knife	Osaka, Japan	1981–present	An all female pop punk/alternative rock band that was one of the first Japanese bands to become known in the US.
Shook Ones	Bellingham, Washington, US	2004–present	A punk rock/melodic hardcore band.
Short Stack	Budgewoi, New South Wales, Australia	2005–2012, 2014–2015, 2020–present	A pop punk/alternative rock/pop rock/emo band.
Showoff	Chicago, Illinois, US	1996–2002, 2005–2006, 2014–present	A pop punk/punk rock/ska punk/alternative rock band. The band's song "Falling Star" reached number 36 on the Billboard Modern Rock chart in 1999. The band's song "Spill" was included in the soundtrack for Digimon: The Movie (2000).
Shrapnel	Red Bank, New Jersey, US	1978–1985	A classic punk rock/power pop band. Two members were future members of Monster Magnet, another future Ramones producer.
Shrapnel	Briton Ferry, Wales, UK	1981–1988	An anarcho-punk band.
Sicko	Seattle, Washington, US	1991–2001, 2018–present	A punk rock/pop punk band that has three songs featured in the video game Project Gotham Racing 2 (2003).
Sick of It All	Queens, New York, New York, US	1986–present	A hardcore punk/beatdown hardcore band.
Siege	Weymouth, Massachusetts, US	1981–1985, 1991–1992, 2016–2023	A hardcore punk/thrashcore/powerviolence band.
Siekiera	Puławy, Poland	1984–1988	A post-punk/hardcore punk/cold wave/new wave band.
Silverstein	Burlington, Ontario, Canada	2000–present	A post-hardcore/emo/indie rock/screamo band has sold over 1,000,000 albums worldwide.
Simple Plan	Montréal, Québec, Canada	1999–present	A punk rock/alternative rock/pop rock/power pop/emo band. The original vocalist and drummer of Reset are now in Simple Plan.
SIN 34	Santa Monica, California, US	1981–1984, 2008–2012	A female fronted hardcore punk band.
Singer Vinger	Estonia	1985–present	A punk rock/rock band.
Siouxsie and the Banshees	London, England, UK	1976–1996, 2002	A successful post-punk/alternative rock/new wave/gothic rock band that is considered to be one of the pioneers of goth fashion and influential to punk fashion.
Sister George	London, England, UK	1993–1996	A queercore/riot grrrl band.
The Sixsters	Kyiv, Ukraine	2018–present	A rock/pop punk/art rock band.
Size	Mexico City, Mexico	1979–1985	A punk rock/post-punk/new wave band.
Ska-P	Vallecas, Madrid, Spain	1994–2005, 2008–2014, 2017–present	A third-wave ska/ska punk/two-tone/punk rock/alternative rock band.
Skarface	France	1991–present	A third-wave ska/punk rock band.
Skarhead	New York, New York, US	1995–present	A hardcore punk band.
Skankin' Pickle	San Jose, California, US	1989–1997	A ska punk/third-wave ska/punk rock band.
Die Skeptiker	East Berlin, Germany	1986–2000, 2006–present	A Deutschpunk band.
Skewbald/Grand Union	Washington, D.C., US	1981	A hardcore punk band.
Skrewdriver	Poulton-le-Flyde, Lancashire, England, UK	1976–1979, 1982–1993	An Oi! band that became a neo-Nazi white power skinhead band.
The Skids	Dunfermline, Scotland, UK	1977–1982, 2007–2010	A punk rock/new wave/post-punk band.
Skindred	Newport, Wales, UK	1998–present	An alternative metal/reggae rock/rap metal/nu metal band.
Skitsystem	Gothenburg, Sweden	1994–2007, 2009–present	A crust punk/grindcore/D-beat band.
The Skitzos	Calgary, Alberta, Canada	2004–2008	A band with influences of raw 1970s punk rock and straight up rock and roll.
Skullhead	Newcastle upon Tyne, England, UK	1984–1994, 2001–2002	A British nationalist Rock Against Communism punk rock band.
Slapshot	Boston, Massachusetts, US	1985–present	A punk rock/hardcore punk band.
Slapstick	Elgin, Illinois, US	1993–1996, periodic reunion performances thereafter	A punk rock/ska punk band.
Slaughter & The Dogs	Wythenshawe, Manchester, England, UK	1976–1978, 1979–1981, 1996–present	A punk rock/Oi!/glam punk/hard rock band.
Slaves	Royal Tunbridge Wells, Kent, England, UK	2012–present	A punk rock/alternative metal/hardcore punk band that changed their name to Soft Play at the end of 2022.
Sleater-Kinney	Olympia, Washington, US	1994–2006, 2014–present	An all female punk rock/indie rock/riot grrrl/alternative rock band.
Sledgeback	Seattle, Washington, US	2004–present	A punk rock/Oi! band.
The Slickee Boys	Washington, D.C., US	1976–1991	A punk rock/garage rock/psychedelic rock/new wave/rock band.
Slightly Stoopid	San Diego, California, US	1994–present	A reggae rock/punk rock band.
Slime	Hamburg, Germany	1979–1984, 1990–1994, 2009–2020, 2020–present	A Deutschpunk band.
The Slits	London, England, UK	1976–1982, 2005–2010	An all female punk rock/post-punk/dub/experimental rock band.
Sloppy Seconds	Indianapolis, Indiana, US	1985–present	A punk rock/garage punk/hard rock band.
Slow Gherkin	Santa Cruz, California, US	1993–2002, 2016–present	A third-wave ska/ska punk/alternative rock band.
Sludgeworth	Chicago, Illinois, US	1989–1992, 2007, 2008, 2022–present	A punk rock band.
Smoke or Fire	Boston, Massachusetts, US	1998–present	A punk rock/pop punk/melodic hardcore band.
Smoking Popes	Lake in the Hills, Illinois, US	1991–1999, 2005–present	A pop punk/alternative rock/indie rock/punk rock/emo band.
Smut Peddlers	Redondo Beach, California, US	1993–present	A punk rock band.
Snapcase	Buffalo, New York, US	1991–2005, 2007, 2010–present	A hardcore punk/metalcore/post-hardcore/alternative metal/crossover thrash band.
SNFU	Edmonton, Alberta, Canada	1981–1989, 1991–2005, 2007–2018	A hardcore punk/skate punk band.
Snot	Santa Barbara, California, US	1995–1998, 2008–2011, 2014–present	A nu metal/hardcore punk/funk metal/alternative metal band.
Snuff	Hendon, London, England, UK	1986–1991, 1994–present	A punk rock band.
Social Distortion	Fullerton, California, US	1978–present	A punk rock/cowpunk/melodic hardcore band that is often regarded as one of the leading bands of the 1980s hardcore punk explosion.
Softball	Tokyo, Japan	1999–2003	An all female punk rock band.
Some Girls	San Diego, California, US	2002–2007	A hardcore punk/mathcore band.
Sonic Boom Six	Manchester, England, UK	2002–present	A punk rock/ska/ragga/hip hop/electronic band.
Sonic's Rendezvous Band	Ann Arbor, Michigan, US	1974–1980	A rock and roll/punk rock/garage rock band.
Son of Sam	Los Angeles, California, US	2000–2001, 2007–2008, 2020–present	A horror punk/heavy metal/hardcore punk/deathrock band.
Sore Throat	Huddersfield, England, UK	1987–1990, 1991	A crust punk/grindcore band.
Sort Sol	Copenhagen, Denmark	1977–present	A post-punk band.
The Soviettes	Minneapolis, Minnesota, US	2001–2006, 2010–2011	A punk rock/pop punk band with 3 female and 1 male.
Soziedad Alkoholika	Vitoria-Gasteiz, Basque Country, Spain	1988–present	A crossover thrash/hardcore punk/thrashcore band.
Spazz	Redwood City, California, US	1992–2000	A powerviolence band.
Spanish Love Songs	Los Angeles, California, US	2013–present	A punk rock/emo/pop punk/indie rock/pop rock band. The band's third album debuted at number 21 on the Vinyl Albums chart and number 61 on the Top Album Sales chart in 2020.
Special Duties	Colchester, Essex, England, UK	1977–1983, 1995–present	A punk rock/hardcore punk/street punk band.
Special Interest	New Orleans, Louisiana, US	2016–present	A dance-punk/noise rock/no wave/industrial rock band.
The Specials	Coventry, West Midlands, England, UK	1977–1981, 1982–1984, 1993, 1996–2001, 2008–2022	A 2 Tone/ska/new wave band.
Spermbirds	Kaiserslautern, Germany	1983–1988, 1989–1996, 1999–2023	A hardcore punk band.
Spitboy	San Francisco, California, US	1990–1995	An all female anarcho-punk/hardcore punk band.
Spizzenergi	England, UK	1979–1982, 1987–1988, 2007–present	A punk rock/post-punk/new wave band that is also known as Spizz Oil, Athletico Spizz 80, The Spizzles, Spizzenergi 2 and SpizzSexual.
The Spits	Kalamazoo, Michigan, US	2000–present	A punk rock/garage punk/electronic rock band.
Split Lip	Indianapolis, Indiana, US	1990–1996, 2009	An emo/indie rock/post-hardcore band.
Splodgenessabounds	Queens Road, Peckham, South London, London, England	1978–present	A punk rock/Oi!/punk pathetique band that is notorious for their provocative live shows.
Spraynard	West Chester, Pennsylvania, US	2008–2012, 2014–present	A punk rock/pop punk/emo/skate punk band with a musical style that is similar to bands like Latterman, RVIVR and Tender Defender.
Squirrel Bait	Louisville, Kentucky, US	1983–1987	A post-hardcore/punk rock/indie rock/emo band.
Squirtgun	Lafayette, Indiana, US	1993–1998, 2001–2004, 2008–present	A punk rock band.
SR-71	Baltimore, Maryland, US	1998–2005, 2009–2010	A pop punk/alternative rock/punk rock band. The band's song "Right Now" reached number 2 on the Modern Rock Tracks chart, number 102 on the Billboard Hot 100, and number 38 on the Mainstream Rock Tracks chart.
SS	Japan	1977–present	A band that is considered to be one of the first Japanese hardcore punk bands.
SSD	Boston, Massachusetts, US	1981–1985	A hardcore punk/heavy metal band.
The Stalin	Fukushima, Japan	1980–1985, 1987–1988, 1989–1993	A hardcore punk band.
Stampin' Ground	Cheltenham, England, UK	1995–2006, 2014	A groove metal/metalcore band.
Stance Punks	Japan	1998–present	A punk rock band.
Stand Atlantic	Sydney, New South Wales, Australia	2012–present	A pop punk band. In early 2014, the band changed their name from What It's Worth to Stand Atlantic.
The Star Club	Nagoya, Japan	1977–present	A hardcore punk band.
Star Fucking Hipsters	New York, New York, US	2005–2013, 2021–present	A punk rock/ska punk/crust punk band.
State Champs	Albany, New York, US	2010–present	A pop punk band. The band's second album was listed at number 8 on Rock Sound's top 50 releases of 2015. The band won Best Breakthrough Band at the Alternative Press Music Awards (2016).
State of Alert	Washington, D.C., US	1980–1981	A hardcore punk band.
Step Forward	Umeå, Sweden	1989–1991	A hardcore punk/youth crew band.
Stiff Little Fingers	Belfast, Northern Ireland, UK	1977–1982, 1987–present	A very influential punk rock band known for their single "Suspect Device".
The Stooges	Ann Arbor, Michigan, US	1967–1971, 1972–1974, 2003–2016	A proto-punk/garage rock/hard rock/punk rock band.
The Story So Far	Walnut Creek, California, US	2007–present	A pop punk band. The band's fourth album debuted at number 19 on the Billboard 200 chart in 2018.
The Stranglers	Guildford, Surrey, England, UK	1974–present	An influential and enduring punk rock/pub rock/new wave/post-punk band, with many hit singles, including "Grip", "Peaches", "Something Better Change", "No More Heroes" and "5 Minutes".
The Straps	Battersea, South London, UK	1978-1983, 1993, 2005-2007, 2011-present	A punk rock/streetpunk band.
Stray from the Path	Long Island, New York, US	2001–present	A metalcore/hardcore punk/rap metal/nu metal band.
Street Dogs	Boston, Massachusetts, US	2002–2020, 2024–present	A street punk/punk rock/Oi! band.
Street Eaters	Berkeley, California, US	2008–present	A rock/post-punk band.
Streetlight Manifesto	East Brunswick, New Jersey, US	2002–present	A punk rock/ska punk band with members from Catch 22.
Stretch Arm Strong	Columbia, South Carolina, US	1992–2005, 2011, 2020–present	A melodic hardcore band.
Strife	Thousand Oaks, California, US	1991–1999, 2001–present	A hardcore punk/metalcore band.
Strike Anywhere	Richmond, Virginia, US	1999–present	A melodic hardcore/anarcho-punk/punk rock/pop punk band.
Strike Under	Chicago, Illinois, US	1980–1981	A classic punk rock band.
Strongarm	Pompano Beach, Florida, US	1993–1998, 2000	A Christian hardcore/Christian metal band.
Strung Out	Simi Valley, California, US	1989–present	A melodic hardcore/hardcore punk/skate punk/punk band.
Student Rick	South Bend, Indiana, US	1998–2002	A pop punk/emo band. The band's song "Falling For You" was featured in the soundtrack for two video games, Aggressive Inline (2002) and Amped 2 (2003).
The Stupids	Ipswich, Suffolk, England, UK	1984–1989, 2008–present	A skate punk band.
Subhumans	Vancouver, British Columbia, Canada	1978–1983, 1995, 2005–2010	A classic punk rock band.
Subhumans	Warminster, Wiltshire, England, UK	1980–1985, 1991, 1998, 2004–present	A anarcho-punk/hardcore punk band.
Sublime	Long Beach, California, US	1988–1996, 2009, 2023–present	A pioneer of ska punk/reggae rock, whose career was cut short following the death of singer/guitarist Bradley Nowell.
Sublime with Rome	Long Beach, California, US	2009–present	A reggae rock/alternative rock/hip hop/dub/ska punk/punk rock band.
Suburban Lawns	Long Beach, California, US	1978–1983	A new wave/post-punk band.
Suburban Rhythm	Long Beach, California, US	1990–1994	A ska punk band.
Suburban Studs	Birmingham, West Midlands, England, UK	1976–1978, 1996	A band that was considered to be one of the original punk rock bands. The band played at the infamous 100 Club gig.
Subway Sect	London, England, UK	1976–1982, 2002–present	A punk rock/post-punk band.
Suicide	New York, New York, US	1970–2016	Influential electro-punk band.
Suicide City	New York, New York, US	2005–present	A punk rock/hardcore punk/horror punk/industrial rock band.
The Suicide Commandos	Minneapolis, Minnesota, US	1975–1979, 1996–present	A proto-punk/punk rock band.
The Suicide File	Boston, Massachusetts, US	2001–2003, 2009, 2015, 2023	A hardcore punk band.
The Suicide Machines	Detroit, Michigan, US	1991–2006, 2009–present	A punk rock/ska punk/hardcore punk band with often fun lyrics and influences of ska.
Suicidal Tendencies	Venice, California, US	1980–present	A band that began their career as a hardcore punk band. As soon as second guitarist Mike Clark joined them in 1987, they eventually became heavy metal band.
Sugarcult	Santa Barbara, California, US	1998–2011	A punk rock/alternative rock band that incorporates power pop and pop punk music.
Sum 41	Ajax, Ontario, Canada	1994–present	A pop punk/skate punk/punk rock/alternative metal/melodic hardcore/alternative rock band.
Super Heroines	Los Angeles, California, US	1981–1988	A deathrock band.
Superjoint Ritual	USA	1993–2004, 2014–2019	A sludge metal/hardcore punk band.
Superman Is Dead	Bali, Indonesia	1995–present	A punk rock band.
Supernova	Costa Mesa, California, US	1989–2010	A punk rock/pop punk band.
The Survivors	Brisbane, Queensland, Australia	1976–1978	A Brisbane punk rock/garage punk band with Sixties leanings.
Sweet Empire	Amsterdam, Netherlands	2008–present	A punk rock/pop punk/power pop/melodic hardcore band.
Swell Maps	Birmingham, West Midlands, England, UK	1972–1980	A punk rock/experimental rock/post-punk/art punk band.
The Swellers	Flint, Michigan	2002–2015	A punk rock/pop punk/emo/melodic hardcore band.
Swing Kids	San Diego, California, US	1994–1997, 2009, 2011	A post-hardcore/mathcore/screamo/punk jazz band.
Swingin' Utters	Santa Cruz, California, US	1988–present	A punk rock/street punk/cowpunk band.
Swiz	Washington, D.C., US	1987–1990, 2004, 2014	A hardcore punk/post-punk/emo band.
Sworn Enemy	Queens, New York, New York, US	1997–present	A band that was initially a hardcore punk band. The sound on later albums changed to metalcore.

== T ==
Band name	Origin	Years active	Brief summary
Tales of Terror	Sacramento, California, US	1983–1986	A hardcore punk band that is often cited as a key inspiration for the grunge scene.
Tara Perdida	Lisbon, Portugal	1995–present	A punk rock/hardcore punk/skate punk band.
Tarakany!	Moscow, Russia	1991–2022	A punk rock band.
Tau Cross	UK	2013–present	A crust punk/heavy metal/punk rock band.
Team Dresch	Olympia, Washington, US	1993–1998, 2004–present	A punk rock/queercore/post-hardcore band.
Tedje en de Flikkers	Nijmegen, Netherlands	1977–1980	A Dutch punk/queercore band.
Teenage Head	Hamilton, Ontario, Canada	1974–present	A punk rock/garage rock band that is considered to be the "Canadian Ramones".
Teenage Bottlerocket	Laramie, Wyoming, US	2000–present	A skate punk band with pop punk influences.
Teengenerate	Tokyo, Japan	1993–1996, 2005	A punk rock/garage punk/garage rock band.
The Teen Idles	Washington, D.C., US	1979–1980	A D.C. hardcore band that was a leading band in the straight edge movement.
Teen Idols	Nashville, Tennessee, US	1992–2003, 2008–2010	A pop punk/punk rock band.
Television	New York, New York, US	1973–1978, 1991–1993, 2001–2023	An art punk/new wave/art rock/proto-punk band.
Tender Defender	Huntington Station, New York, US	2015–present	A punk rock/pop punk band. All three members of the band (Mattie Jo Canino, Phil Douglas, and Pat Schramm) are ex-members of Latterman. The band is considered by many to be a continuation of Latterman.
Ten Foot Pole	Simi Valley, California, US	1983–2006, 2009–present	A punk rock/skate punk band, formerly known as Scared Straight until 1993.
Tenpole Tudor	London, England, UK	1977–present	A punk rock/new wave/rockabilly band.
Ten Yard Fight	Boston, Massachusetts, US	1995–1999	A hardcore punk/punk rock band.
Terror	Los Angeles, California, US	2002–present	A hardcore punk/beatdown hardcore band.
Terrorgruppe	Berlin, Germany	1993–2005, 2013–2022	A Deutschpunk/punk pathetique band.
Terveet Kädet	Tornio, Finland	1980–present	A hardcore punk band.
Tex & the Horseheads	Los Angeles, California, US	1980–1986, 2007–present	A punk rock/punk blues/cowpunk/deathrock band.
Texas Terri and the Stiff Ones	Los Angeles, California, US	c. 1998–c. 2006	A punk music group fronted by Terri Laird.
Thatcher On Acid	Somerset, England, UK	1983–1998	An anarcho-punk band.
Þeyr (They're)	Reykjavík, Iceland	1980–1983, 2006	A new wave/post-punk/punk rock band.
This Bike Is a Pipe Bomb	Pensacola, Florida, US	1997–2011	A folk punk/cowpunk band.
This Is Hell	New York, New York, US	2004–present	A hardcore punk/crossover thrash/melodic hardcore band.
The Thorns of Life	New York, New York, US	2008–2009	A punk rock band.
Thought Riot	California, US	1997–2006	A hardcore punk/punk rock band.
Thrice	Irvine, California, US	1999–2012, 2015–present	A post-hardcore/alternative rock/pop punk/experimental rock/art rock/melodic hardcore/emo band.
Throwdown	Orange County, California, US	1997–present	A hardcore punk/beatdown hardcore/metalcore/groove metal band.
The Thumbs	Baltimore, Maryland, US	1995–2002	A punk rock band.
Tiger Army	Berkeley, California, US	1996–present	A psychobilly/horror punk/alternative rock band.
Tijuana Sweetheart	Allston, Massachusetts, US	2005–2012	A punk rock/alternative rock/riot grrrl band.
Tilt	East Bay, California, US	1992–2001, 2015–present	A punk rock band.
Time Again	Hollywood, Los Angeles, California, US	2004–present	An American street punk band that is heavily influenced by Rancid.
Timeshares	Downstate New York, New York, US	2009–present	An indie rock/alternative rock/punk rock band that is best known for their song "From An Admirer Not Darryl".
Title Fight	Kingston, Pennsylvania, US	2003–2018	A post-hardcore/melodic hardcore/soft grunge/shoegaze/post-rock/hardcore punk band.
Titus Andronicus	Glen Rock, New Jersey, US	2005–present	A critically acclaimed punk rock/indie rock/art punk/heartland rock band.
The Toasters	New York, New York, US	1981–present	A third-wave ska band.
Toe to Toe	Sydney, New South Wales, Australia	1992–present	A hardcore punk/soul band.
Tom DeLonge	San Diego, California, US	2015	A punk rock artist. His debut studio album "To the Stars... Demos, Odds, and Ends" was released four months after his departure from Blink-182. He was credited with playing all instruments except for bass guitar on one song and drums.
Too Rude	Hermosa Beach, California, US	2000–2004	A reggae/reggae rock/punk rock band.
Total Chaos	Pomona Valley, California, US	1989–present	A hardcore punk/street punk/punk rock band.
Die Toten Hosen	Düsseldorf, Germany	1982–present	A Deutschpunk band.
Touché Amoré	Los Angeles, California, US	2007–present	A post-hardcore/screamo/melodic hardcore band.
The Tower of Dudes	Prague, Czech Republic	2007–present	A cowpunk/Gypsy punk band.
Towers of London	Buckinghamshire, England, UK	2004–2009, 2015–present	A hard rock/punk rock/glam metal/indie rock band.
Toxic Narcotic	Boston, Massachusetts, US	1989–present	A DIY crust punk/hardcore punk band.
Toxic Reasons	Dayton, Ohio, US	1979–1995	A classic punk rock/hardcore punk band.
Toxic Waste	Belfast, Northern Ireland, UK	1982–1986	A punk rock/anarcho-punk band.
Toy Dolls	Sunderland, Tyne and Wear, England, UK	1979–present	A punk rock/Oi!/punk pathetique/new wave band.
Toys That Kill	San Pedro, Los Angeles, California, US	1999–present	A punk rock band.
Tragedy	Memphis, Tennessee, US	2000–present	A hardcore punk/crust punk/D-beat band.
Los Traidores	Montevideo, Uruguay	1986–2003	A punk rock/post-punk/new wave/alternative rock band.
Transplants	California, US	1999–2003, 2004–2006, 2010–present	A rapcore/rap rock/punk rock project made up by members of Rancid and Blink-182.
Trap Them	Salem, New Hampshire, US	2001–2017	A metalcore/hardcore punk band that blends grindcore, crust punk, and death metal.
Trapped Under Ice	Baltimore, Maryland, US	2007–2013, 2015–present	A hardcore punk band that includes Brendan Yates of Turnstile as a member.
Trashlight Vision	USA	2004–2007, 2011	A punk rock band.
Trash Talk	Sacramento, California, US	2005–present	A hardcore punk/thrashcore/crossover thrash band.
The Trashwomen	San Francisco Bay Area, California, US	1991–1997, 2007–2008	An all female garage punk/surf band.
Treble Charger	Sault Ste. Marie, Ontario, Canada	1992–2006, 2012–present	An indie rock/pop punk/alternative rock band.
Tribe 8	San Francisco, California, US	1991–2005	A queercore/punk rock band.
Tripface	New York, New York, US	1993–1997	A hardcore punk band.
Tři sestry	Prague, Czech Republic	1985–present	A punk rock/pub rock band.
T.S.O.L. (True Sounds of Liberty)	Long Beach, California, US	1978–2006, 2007–present	A punk rock/hardcore punk/horror punk/hard rock/deathrock band that later turned to glam metal/hair metal.
Tsunami Bomb	Petaluma, California, US	1998–2005, 2009, 2015–present	A punk rock/pop punk/melodic hardcore band.
The Tuberkuloited	Sindi, Estonia	1991-2007	A punk rock band.
Tuesday	Chicago, Illinois, US	1996–1999	An emo/punk rock band.
Turbonegro	Nesodden, Norway	1989–1998, 2002–2010, 2011–present	A glam punk band that combines hard rock and punk rock into a style the band describes as "deathpunk".
Turning Point	Moorestown, New Jersey, US	1988–1991, 1994, 2016–present	A hardcore punk/melodic hardcore/emo band.
Turnstile	Baltimore, Maryland, US	2010–present	A hardcore punk/melodic hardcore/alternative rock band.
TZN Xenna	Warsaw, Poland	1981–1987, 2011–present	A classic punk rock band.

== U ==
Band name	Origin	Years active	Brief summary
UFX	Blackpool, England, UK	2000–present	A "junk rock"/gothic rock/punk rock/alternative rock band.
UK Decay	Luton, England, UK	1978–1983, 1993, 2005–present	A post-punk/gothic rock band.
U.K. Subs	London, England, UK	1976–present	A classic punk rock/street punk/hardcore punk band.
The U-Men	Seattle, Washington, US	1980–1989	A punk rock/post-punk/garage rock/noise rock/rockabilly band.
Unbroken	San Diego County, California, US	1991–1995, 1998, 2010–2012, 2014, 2023–present	A metalcore/hardcore punk band.
The Undead	New York, New York, US	1980–present	A horror punk/punk rock/hardcore punk band.
The Undertones	Derry, Northern Ireland, UK	1974–1983, 1999–present	A proto-punk/punk rock/pop punk/power pop/new wave band.
Units	San Francisco, California, US	1978–1984	A new wave/electronic rock band.
Unsane	New York, New York, US	1988–2000, 2003–2019, 2021–present	A noise rock/post-hardcore/alternative metal band.
The Unseen	Hingham, Massachusetts, US	1993–present	A street punk/melodic hardcore band.
Untouchables	Washington, D.C., US	1979–1981	A punk rock/hardcore punk band.
Unwritten Law	Poway, California, US	1990–present	A punk rock/pop punk/skate punk/alternative rock band.
Urban Waste	New York, New York, US	1981–1984	A hardcore punk band.
Urinals	Los Angeles, California, US	1978–1983, 1996–present	A classic punk rock band known for their minimalistic style in their lyrics that is sometimes even referred to as "punk haiku".
U.S. Bombs	Huntington Beach, California, US	1993–present	A punk rock/street punk band.
Useless ID	Haifa, Israel	1994–present	A punk rock/pop punk/skate punk band that is considered to be the most successful punk rock band in Israel.

== V ==
Band name	Origin	Years active	Brief summary
Valencia	Philadelphia, Pennsylvania, US	2004–2011, 2016–present	An alternative rock/pop punk band. The band is named after the wife of the protagonist, Valencia, in the book by Kurt Vonnegut, Slaughterhouse-Five.
The Valves	Edinburgh, Scotland, UK	1977–1979	A classic punk rock band.
Vampire Lovers	Brisbane, Queensland, Australia	1982–1984, 1988–1990	A Brisbane punk rock/death rock/garage punk/alternative rock band which developed into a horror punk/heavy metal hybrid in their later period.
The Vandals	Huntington Beach, California, US	1980–present	A punk rock band that turned pop punk. The band is well known for their use of humor and sarcasm.
The Varukers	Leamington Spa, England, UK	1979–1988, 1993–present	A hardcore punk/classic punk rock/crust punk/street punk/anarcho-punk band.
Vatican Commandos	Darien Connecticut, US	1982–1985, 2011	A hardcore punk band of which Moby was a member.
Vennaskond	Tallinn, Harju County, Estonia	1984–2006, 2007–present	A punk rock/post-punk/glam punk band.
Venomous Concept	New York, New York, US	2004–present	A hardcore punk/grindcore/extreme metal band.
Verbal Abuse	Houston, Texas, US	1981–1995, 2004–present	A hardcore punk/crossover thrash band.
Verse	Providence, Rhode Island, US	2003–2009, 2011–2013	A hardcore punk/melodic hardcore band.
The Vibrators	London, England, UK	1976–2022	A classic punk rock band.
Vice Squad	Bristol, England, UK	1979–1985, 1997–present	A female fronted punk rock/street punk band.
The Victims	Perth, Western Australia, Australia	1977–1979	A classic punk rock band.
Victims of Circumstance	Clearwater, Florida, US	2005–present	A punk rock band known for blending pop-hooks with a unique style of ska.
Victims Family	Santa Rosa, California, US	1984-2001, 2004, 2009, 2011, 2012, 2019–present	A hardcore punk rock band, incorporating elements of jazz, funk, hard rock, and noise.
The Viletones	Toronto, Ontario, Canada	1977–present	A classic punk rock band.
The Vindictives	Chicago, Illinois, US	1991–1996, 1999, 2012–present	A punk rock band.
The Virus	Philadelphia, Pennsylvania, US	1998–2004, 2013–present	A street punk band.
Virus Nine	Medford, Oregon, US	1996–2010	A punk rock band.
Los Violadores	Buenos Aires, Argentina	1981–1992, 1995–1996, 2000–2011, 2016–2019	A Latino-American punk rock/hard rock/post-punk band that was founded during Argentina's "El Proceso" military dictatorship.
Violent Delight	St Albans, Hertfordshire, England, UK	2000–2006	A punk rock/heavy metal band.
Violent Femmes	Milwaukee, Wisconsin, US	1981–2009, 2013–present	A folk punk/alternative rock band.
Violent Apathy	Kalamazoo, Michigan, U.S.	1981–present	A punk rock/hardcore punk band that formed in March 1981 at Western Michigan University.
Vision of Disorder	Long Island, New York, New York, US	1992–2002, 2006, 2008–present	A hardcore punk/metalcore/alternative metal/groove metal band.
Richard Hell and the Voidoids	New York, New York, US	1976–1979, 1981–1983, 1990, 2000	A classic punk rock/art punk band.
Voodoo Glow Skulls	Riverside, California, US	1988–present	A ska punk band.
Voorhees	Durham, County Durham, England, UK	1991–2001, 2004, 2010, 2012–present	A hardcore punk band.
Void	Columbia, Maryland, US	1979–1984	A hardcore punk/thrashcore band.
Vorkriegsjugend	Berlin, Germany	1982–1985, 1998–1999	A Deutschpunk/hardcore punk band.

== W ==
Band name	Origin	Years active	Brief summary
Wakefield	Mechanicsville, Maryland, US	2000–2008	An alternative rock/pop punk band that made an uncredited appearance in the 2004 movie, New York Minute.
The Wall	Sunderland, Tyne And Wear, England, UK	1978–1983, 2007–2022	A classic punk rock band.
Les Wampas	Paris, France	1983–present	A punk rock/pop punk/psychobilly band that refers to their music as "Yé-yé punk".
The Wanderers	England, UK	1980-1981	A punk rock band that consisted of Stiv Bators and members of Sham 69.
The Wanton Looks	Chicago, Illinois, US	2009–2013	An all female pop punk/punk rock band that is described as reminiscent of Joan Jett's early 1980's work.
Warzone	Lower East Side, Manhattan, New York, New York, US	1982–1997	A hardcore punk band.
Wasted Youth	Los Angeles, California, US	1981–1988	A hardcore punk/crossover thrash band.
Waterparks	Houston, Texas, US	2011–present	A pop rock/electropop/alternative rock/hyperpop band that started out by playing pop punk.
Wavves	Los Angeles, California, US	2008–present	A lo fi alternative rock/indie rock/pop punk/surf band that was started by Nathan Williams and also includes members from Jay Reatard's band.
Wayne County & the Electric Chairs	New York, New York, US	1977–1979	A female fronted classic punk rock/glam punk band.
WC	Miastko, Poland	1981–present	A punk rock band.
The Wedding	Fayetteville, Arkansas, US	2003–2015	An alternative rock/post-hardcore/Christian punk band.
Wednesday 13	Charlotte, North Carolina, US	1992–present	A horror punk/heavy metal/gothic metal/hardcore punk/glam metal/glam punk/outlaw country artist.
Wednesday Night Heroes	Edmonton, Alberta, Canada	1997–2009	A punk rock/Oi!/street punk/hardcore punk band.
Weezer	Los Angeles, California, US	1992–1997, 2000–present	A power pop/pop rock/geek rock/emo band that started out playing alternative rock/pop punk and then indie pop in 2010.
The Weirdos	Los Angeles, California, US	1975–1981, 1986–1992, 2004–2005, 2013–present	A proto-punk/classic punk rock band.
Westbound Train	Boston, Massachusetts, US	2001–present	A ska/reggae/soul band.
Western Addiction	San Francisco, California, US	2003–2006, 2013–present	A hardcore punk/punk rock/melodic hardcore band.
White Flag	Inland Empire, California, US	1982–present	A punk rock band.
The White Stripes	Detroit, Michigan, US	1997–2011	A garage rock/blues rock/alternative rock/punk blues/indie rock band.
White Trash Debutantes	San Francisco, California, US	1986–present	A punk rock/pop punk band.
Whole Wheat Bread	Jacksonville, Florida, US	2003–present	A punk rock/pop punk/hardcore punk/rapcore band who has toured with bands such as Big D and the Kids Table and The Aquabats.
The Wildhearts	Newcastle upon Tyne, England, UK	1989–1997, 2001–2009, 2012–2022, 2024–present	A hard rock/pop/punk rock/heavy metal band.
A Wilhelm Scream	New Bedford, Massachusetts, US	1996–present	A melodic hardcore/punk rock/skate punk/heavy metal band that was formerly known as Smackin' Isaiah, Koen, and Adam's Crack.
Wipers	Portland, Oregon, US	1977–1989, 1993–1999	A classic punk rock/post-punk/hardcore punk/post-hardcore band.
Wire	London, England, UK	1976–1980, 1985–1992, 1999–present	An influential art punk/punk rock band, especially in the development of the post-punk genre.
Wisdom In Chains	Stroudsburg, Pennsylvania, US	2002–present	A hardcore punk/punk rock/alternative metal/Oi! band.
Wizo	Sindelfingen, Germany	1985–2005, 2009–present	A Deutschpunk/hardcore punk/anarcho-punk band.
Wlochaty	Szczecin, Poland	1987–present	A hardcore punk/anarcho-punk band.
Wolfbrigade	Sweden	1995–2004, 2007–2012, 2014–present	A crust punk/melodic death metal band.
The Wonder Years	Lansdale, Pennsylvania, US	2005–present	An emo/alternative rock/pop punk band.
World Burns to Death	Austin, Texas, US	2000–present	A crust punk band.
The World/Inferno Friendship Society	Brooklyn, New York, US	1994–2021	A punk rock/dark cabaret band.
Wrangler Brutes	Los Angeles, California, US	2003–2004	A hardcore punk band.
WSTR	Liverpool, England, UK	2015–present	A pop punk band that was originally named Waster until they decided to change their name after a Canadian band with the same name issued a "cease and desist" letter. WSTR is still Waster but without vowels.
The Wynona Riders	East Bay, California, US	1988–present	A punk rock/pop punk band.

== X ==
Band name	Origin	Years active	Brief summary
X	Sydney, New South Wales, Australia	1977–present	A classic punk rock band.
X	Los Angeles, California, US	1977–1993, 2004–present	A classic punk rock/alternative rock band.
xDISCIPLEx A.D.	Erie, Pennsylvania, US	1995–2004	A Christian hardcore/thrash metal/hardcore punk/Christian metal band.
X!NK	Belgium	2001–2009, 2022–present	A pop punk band.
X-Pistols	Southern California, US/Oregon, US	2010–present	A punk rock band.
X-Pulsion	Brussels, Belgium	1977–1978	A classic punk rock band.
X-Ray Spex	London, England, UK	1976–1979, 1991, 1995–1996, 2008	A classic punk rock band that featured Poly Styrene on vocals and Lora Logic on saxophone.

== Y ==
Band name	Origin	Years active	Brief summary
Yeah Yeah Yeahs	New York, New York, US	2000–2014, 2017–present	A garage punk/garage rock/indie rock/art punk/dance-punk/post-punk revival band.
Yellowcard	Jacksonville, Florida, US	1997–2008, 2010–2017, 2022–present	A pop punk/alternative rock/hardcore punk band.
Yidcore	Melbourne, Victoria, Australia	1998–2009, 2011, 2019	A Jewish rock/punk rock/comedy rock band.
You Me At Six	Weybridge, Surrey, England, UK	2004–2025	A pop punk/alternative rock/pop rock/post-hardcore band.
Youngblood Brass Band	Madison, Wisconsin, US	1998–present	A jazz/hip hop/punk rock/punk jazz band.
Young Canadians	Vancouver, British Columbia, Canada	1979–1980	A punk rock/garage rock band.
The Young and the Useless	New York, New York, US	1980–1984	A punk rock band.
The Young Werewolves	Philadelphia, Pennsylvania, US	2002–2015	A rockabilly/psychobilly/garage rock/horror punk band.
Your Heart Breaks	Bellingham, Washington, US	1998–present	A "collaborative music project" with over 50 members in the lower 48 states that plays a blend of indie rock, folk and punk rock, with an electronic influence.
Youth Brigade	Hollywood, Los Angeles, California, US	1980–1987, 1991–present	A hardcore punk band. Three of the four members of the band are brothers.
Youth Brigade	Washington, D.C., US	1980–1981, 2012–2013	A hardcore punk band.
Youth Defense League	New York, New York, US	1986–present	An Oi!/New York hardcore band.
Youth Gone Mad	Los Angeles, California, US	1980–present	A punk rock/hardcore punk band.
Youth in Asia	London, England, UK	1981–1984	An anarcho-punk band.
Youth of Today	Danbury, Connecticut, US	1985–1990, 1994, 1999, 2003–2004, 2010–present	A straight edge New York hardcore/positive hardcore band.
The Yuppie Pricks	Austin, Texas, US	1999–present	A comedy punk rock band that reverses the traditional "working class punk" ethos and instead flaunts their wealth and affluence, in a comical, over-the-top way.

== Z ==
Band name	Origin	Years active	Brief summary
Zbogom Brus Li	Novi Sad, Vojvodina, Serbia	1992–2000, 2005–present	A punk rock/folk punk/children's music/pop rock band.
Zebrahead	La Habra, California, United States	1996–present	A punk rock/pop punk/rap rock/rapcore/ska punk band.
Zeke	Seattle, Washington, US	1992–present	A hardcore punk/hard rock/heavy metal/speed metal band.
The Zeros	Chula Vista, California, US	1976–1980	A classic punk rock band.
The Zeros	England, UK	1977–1979, 1988, 2000s–present	A classic punk rock band.
Zero Boys	Indianapolis, Indiana, US	1980–1985, 1987–1988, 1991–1994, 2006–present	A punk rock/hardcore punk band.
Zikney Tzfat	Tel Aviv, Israel	1990–1996	A grunge/punk rock band.
Zóna A	Bratislava, Slovakia	1984–present	A punk rock band.
Zounds	Reading, Berkshire, England, UK	1977–1982, 2001–present	An anarcho-punk/post-punk band.
