= Stellar West =

American band

- Stellar West performing at Riot Fest 2016 in Chicago, Illinois

Background information
- Genres: Alternative rock, punk rock
- Years active: 2014–present
- Members: Parker Belonio; Cole Onley; Levi Hansen; JC Kuppinger
- Website: www.stellarwestofficial.com

Stellar West is an American indie punk band from Naperville, Illinois, United States, formed in 2014. The group consists of Parker Belonio (vocals, guitar), Cole Onley (bass guitar), Levi Hansen (guitar) and JC Kuppinger (drums). Their debut release, the EP Songs From the Basement, was released on October 22, 2015, and their first album, Unfiltered, was released on November 13, 2016. Both the EP and LP were produced by Adam Krier and engineered by Andy Gerber at Million Yen Studios. Pre-production was done at Sound Summit with Adam Krier and Charlie Dresser. Their EP Kermit the Fraud was produced and engineered at Sound Summit Studios in Naperville. On September 27, 2020, they released Penny. Penny is a single off of MORTAL WOMBAT, their sophomore LP which drops October 10, 2020. This LP was also produced and engineered at Sound Summit.

== History ==
Stellar West (formerly Stellar) formed in May 2014 after the trio met at a School of Rock in their hometown, not unlike other up and coming young bands, Hippo Campus and Doll Skin who got the same start. Just over a year after their formation, they released their debut EP, Songs From the Basement, digitally and on CD. At the end of 2015, the band was recognized by Forkster Promotions by winning three categories in the website's year-end music awards, including placing 50 out of the top 100 new artists of the year.

January 2016 saw the band being invited to perform live on WGN Morning News, where they performed their song "Interference" and a cover of Nirvana's "Smells Like Teen Spirit". In mid-2016, the band won a contest through the music festival Riot Fest and were invited to perform at the event later that year.

Stellar West's first album, Unfiltered, was released at the end of 2016. Following its release, the band was included in Alternative Press's list of the best bands under 21.

In April 2017, the band was chosen as a top Chicago finalist to open for Metallica on a five city tour.

== Discography ==
=== EPs ===
- Songs From the Basement (2015)
- Kermit the Fraud (2019)

=== Albums ===
- Unfiltered (2016)
- MORTAL WOMBAT (OCT 2020)

== Band members ==
Current members

- Parker Belonio – vocals, guitar
- Cole Onley – bass guitar
- Levi Hansen – guitar
- JC Kuppinger - drums

== See also ==
- List of alternative rock artists
- List of punk rock bands, L–Z
