= Toxik Ephex =

Scottish anarcho-punk band

- Toxik Ephex live in 2005 at the Lemon Tree, Aberdeen

Background information
- Origin: Aberdeen, Scotland
- Years active: 1979–present
- Labels: Green Vomit, Mad Butcher

Toxik Ephex is a Scottish anarcho-punk band, who was first formed in 1979 as The Abductors by founding member Fred "Inspector Blake" Wilkinson.

== History ==
The Abductors were formed in Aberdeen in 1979 by Gary 'Wee Eck' Dawson on vocals, Keith Thomson on drums, Steve 'Stepe' Dempster on bass and Fred 'Inspector Blake' Wilkinson on guitar. Members came and went, such as Jimmy Sim on Drums and 'Trouper' on bass. By September 1980, the band's noxious reputation, combined with tragic, unconnected events elsewhere in Aberdeen, precipitated a change of name. Blakey found the name in a medical book whilst working as a pharmacy technician.

Toxik's first recording was a live recording made at the 62 Club in Aberdeen. They cut the track "Police Brutality" to tape which was later included on the compilation record Bullshit Detector Vol.2 on Crass Records.

The line up changed again in 1982 with Mikey "Gloo Pimp" Smith joining on bass guitar and "Chiz the Whizz" joining on drums. In September 1985, Dod Copland replaced Dawson on vocals with Frank Benzie joining on guitar soon after, thus forming the classic (and most familiar) Toxik Ephex line-up.

In 1987, the band recorded their first single, "Punk As Fuck", at Pier House studios in Edinburgh, after the recommendation from fellow punk rockers Oi Polloi. Wilkinson started his own record label Green Vomit Records to distribute the record. The first press, released with hand made covers sold out very quickly, and a repress was made with properly printed covers.

In 1988, the band joined forces with Oi Polloi to release a split album. Toxik's side (titled Mad as Fuck) started with their punk rock take of "Wild Side of Life".

In 1989, they released another split record, this time with Welsh punk band Shrapnel. A full-length release followed in 1991, funded by 1-up Records from Aberdeen. The full length would be their "final epitaph" as the band would split up soon after with the members going in different directions.

Toxik's sound is unique and has inspired many other Scottish punk bands such as Ex-Cathedra. Wilkinson is interested and involved in folk music, and Copland (an accomplished piper in his own right) often started gigs playing his bagpipes which won over the crowds in Europe. This fusion of Scottish folk and bagpipes combined with punk can now be heard in various bands such as Dropkick Murphys and The Real McKenzies. Jello Biafra of the Dead Kennedys rates Toxik Ephex as the best ever Scottish punk band.

== Reformation ==
The band reformed originally in 1999 with Frank Benzie being replaced on guitar. The band embarked on a mini tour on Scotland with The Men They Couldn't Hang as well as returning to their second home, Shetland. This reformation soon fizzled out with Wilkinson leaving. A completely new line-up was put together with only Copland, Chiz and Benzie remaining from the earlier line-up. This incarnation played their comeback gig with the Dead Kennedys in Aberdeen. The band soon split again, but were to reform with Wilkinson and Smith again for their 25th anniversary. The band now regularly host one-off gigs.

In 2006, Runnin Feart fanzine released Toxik Ephex's first new recording in over 15 years, the 7" single "Civilised". Topplers Records from Scotland have gone on to reissue most of their back catalogue, with plans afoot to re-released everything on a double CD set.

Copland died on 28 July 2022 at the age of 59.

== Discography ==
=== Compilations ===
- Bullshit Detector Vol 2 – "Police Brutality" (released 1980 Crass Records)

=== Singles ===
- "Punk As Fuck" (released 1987 Green Vomit Records)
- "'Acts of Desperation" – split with Shrapnel (released 1989 Words of Warning Records)
- "Civilised" (b/w "Land of No Opportunity") (released 2006 Runnin' Feart records)

=== LPs ===
Title	Details
Mad as Fuck (with Oi Polloi)	Released: 1988; Label: Green Vomit Records
Nobby Porthole The Cock of the North	Released: 1991; Label: Green Vomit Records, 1up
Immune to the Media	Released: 12 May 2023; Label: Mad Butcher Records; Track listing: 1. "Immune to the Media"; 2. "Old Fuckers Still Kick Ass"; 3. "Letters"; 4. "Penny from Me"; 5. "Suck My Fist"; 6. "Put a Sock in It"; 7. "Why Aren't We Fighting?"; 8. "Last Night I"; 9. "Drag of a Day"; 10. "Goolies"; 11. "Take Your Share"
