= Malignus Youth =

Hardcore punk band

- Origin: Sierra Vista, Arizona
- Genres: Hardcore punk, melodic hardcore
- Years active: 1987–1994, 1999–Present
- Label: Youth Inc. Records
- Past members: James Martin; Octavio Olaje; Tom Shelden; Mike Armenta

Malignus Youth was a hardcore punk band from Sierra Vista, Arizona, that was active from 1987–1994 and again from 1999–2001. They continue to play sporadic reunion shows through 2020.

Known for their unique sound featuring exceptional complexity in musical arrangements, vocal harmonies, melodic structure, classical music influences, and fast tempos, Malignus Youth have released two LPs (including one live album), two 7-inch EPs, a five-part musical setting of the Roman Catholic Mass on CD, and a retrospective CD compilation of unreleased tracks. Their vinyl output was also collected onto one CD.

== Lineup ==
Band members included:

- James Martin (guitars/vocals)
- Octavio Olaje (vocals)
- Tom Shelden (bass/vocals)
- Mike Armenta (drums/vocals)

== Musical style ==
Typical of traditional hardcore punk, early Malignus Youth songs featured fast tempos, 4/4 time, slow introductions followed by fast verse-chorus-verse, and lyrics with social relevance.

As their musical style developed, song tempos became faster (up to 340–380 beats per minute). Shouted vocals developed into three-part harmonies. Song structures became more complicated. Guitar solos were very rare, only occurring in three songs in their 60-song catalog. Instead, the single guitar would serve as accompaniment to fluid, singing, melodic bass lines played by Shelden in high ranges uncommon in hardcore punk. Four part polyrhythms consisting of guitar, vocal and Armenta's drum lines served to counterpoint Shelden's bass guitar. Complicated minor and modal chord progressions appear in some songs.

Other features that characterized Malignus Youth's musical style were the use of authentic cadences. These chord progressions of 4 to 6 chords would repeat at a fast tempo giving the listener an intuitive feeling of tension-release-tension. Also, by taking turns on the lead vocal, an impression would be created that a single vocalist was singing fast lyrics for a long duration, all in one breath without interruption.

== History ==
=== First self-titled EP release (1988) ===
In January 1988, using a late 1970s model four-track reel to reel, eight songs were recorded live in Martin's parents' bedroom-turned-studio. These eight tracks were released on a clear vinyl extended-play (EP) album, self-entitled Malignus Youth on their new label Youth Inc Records. These albums are now out of print.

=== The Southern Arizona hardcore scene (1988-1990) ===
In the late 1980s, the active punk rock scene in Cochise County surged new bands such as Dover Trench, Opinion Zero, Headspace (not to be confused with the British band), Blood Spasm, Civil Order, Feast Upon Cactus Thorns, Cosmic Jackhammer, E.G.A.D.S., Attack Mode, Unshaven Apricots and many more. Later in 1989, Malignus Youth was booked on the same bill as Bad Religion. They also opened for Citizen Fish, Dirty Rotten Imbeciles, and The Misfits.

=== Crisis 7-inch EP (1990) ===
In 1990, a second EP, Crisis, was released as a limited edition red and white vinyl which has since become out of print. The music contained themes of conflict, personal loss, fear of growing up, hopelessness and suicide. Crisis marked a diversion from punk rock conventions by adopting composition techniques associated with classical music.

=== More To It LP (1991) ===
These unique elements of Malignus Youth's music were displayed in the 1991 full-length LP More To It, released on blue vinyl. This album is now out of print.

More To It took the shape of a concept album, the resolution of the "crisis" explored in the previous EP, united by keys and themes, and partially inspired by the writings of philosopher Immanuel Kant Arguably, More To It represented Malignus Youth musical style at its most sophisticated. The album featured artistic elements and experimental tangents in different musical styles, and even slight canonic variation. This range of borrowed styles demonstrated a familiarity with musical theory mostly uncharacteristic of punk rock.

=== On tour (1992) ===
Large audience responses subsequently encouraged a growing respect for Malignus Youth within the punk rock world, with other established artists eventually attesting to their quality.

Over the next three years, Malignus Youth toured the western United States, playing at Tacoland in San Antonio, at Northern California's 924 Gilman Street with Green Day, in Salt Lake City with The Mighty Mighty Bosstones and in Fort Collins, Colorado with The Offspring. Mailignus Youth had also opened up for Fear, Citizen Fish, D.R.I, and The Misfits.

=== "Missa Brevis" and "Ephemeral" ===
Between tours in 1993, Malignus Youth released a setting of the Roman Catholic Mass, designated "Missa brevis". This work, an homage to the Western Classical tradition of composing music for liturgical texts, and featuring the Greek and Latin text with additional English lyrics, was released with additional unreleased tracks, collectively called Ephemeral. This album is now out of print.

=== Breakup and compilation "Vinyl CD" (1994-1998) ===
Following their 1994 tour, the members of Malignus Youth separated to pursue different academic and musical goals and unofficially disbanded.

In the next few years, as the original vinyl pressings became rarer and rarer, demand for Malignus Youth on CD prompted a 1998 re-release of the Malignus Youth EP, the Crisis EP and the full-length LP, More To It on a single CD entitled Vinal CD. These CDs are now out of print.

=== Tucson reunion show and documentary (2014) ===
In summer 2014, Malignus Youth reunited for a one-time fundraising show at the Rialto Theater in Tucson, AZ. Footage from this concert was recorded for a Kickstarter-funded documentary, "Family: The Story of Malignus Youth" (working title). On 2 June 2019, the full concert video was released on YouTube by the band as "Malignus Youth: The Genius and the Strange".

== Discography ==
=== 7" EPs ===
- Malignus Youth (Youth Inc., 1990)

[2 pressings of 500 copies - clear vinyl first pressing, black vinyl second pressing]

- Crisis (Youth Inc., 1991)

[1 pressing of 1000 copies - 500 on red vinyl, 500 on white vinyl]

=== Albums ===
- More To It LP (Youth Inc., 1992)

[1200 copies pressed on blue vinyl]

- Missa Brevis/Ephemeral CD (Youth Inc., 1998)
- Vinyl CD (Youth Inc., 1999)
- Rialto Live Double LP (Youth Ink., 2020)

[500 copies pressed on red vinyl]

=== Home video ===
Live at the Sweatlodge - March 24, 1990 - Bisbee, Arizona (Youth Inc.)

=== Compilation appearances ===
- Yeah But It's a Dry Heat (West World Records, 1993)
- Southern AZ compilation with Malignus Youth, Fells, Lonely Trojans, Zero Tolerance Task Force, Skinnerbox, Feast Upon Cactus Thorns, Mondo Guano, Bloodspasm, etc.
- Malignus Youth tracks "I.U.T.Y." (CD only) and "Shadows" (on both the LP and CD)
