= Senior Discount (band) =

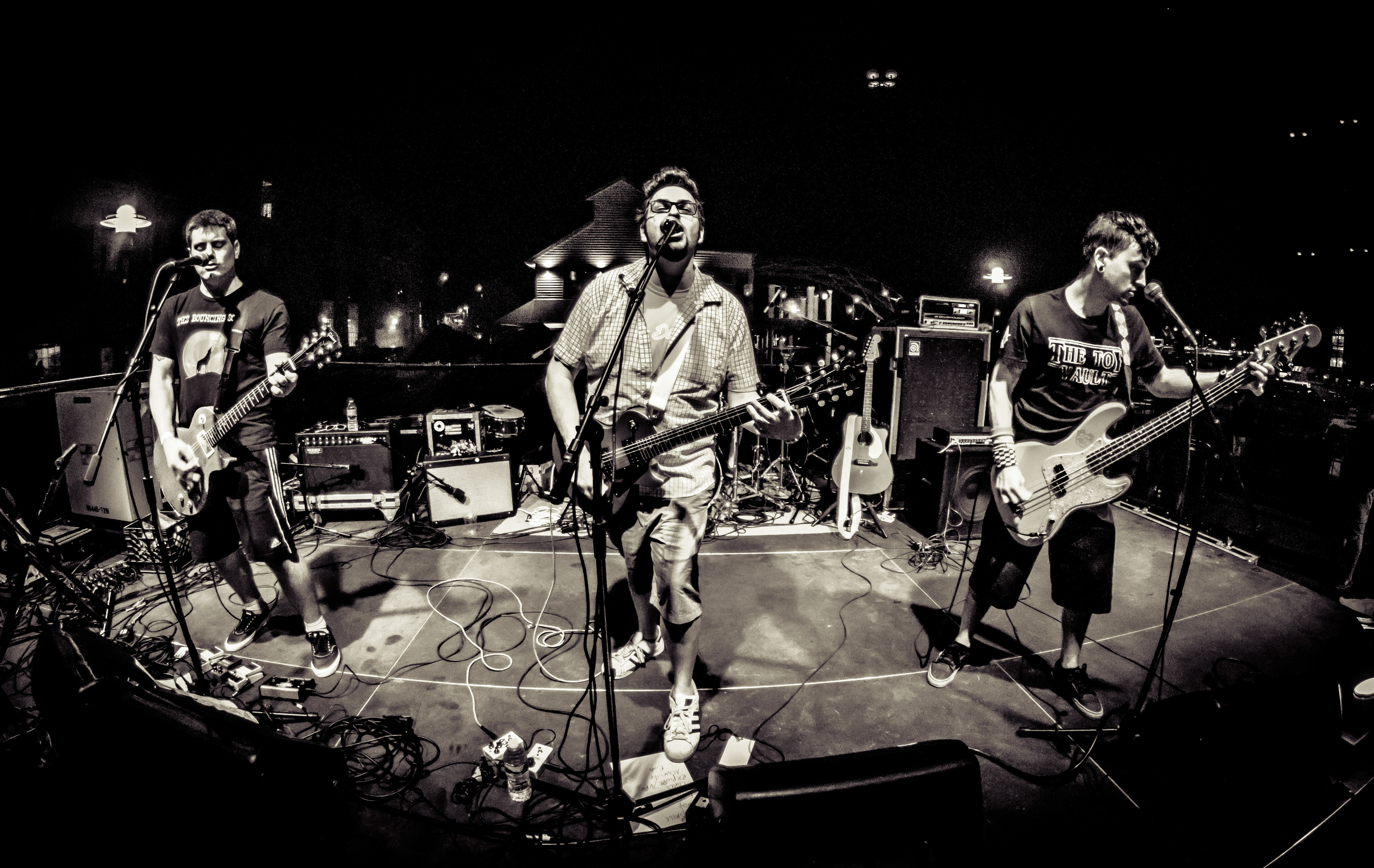

Background information
- Origin: Providence, Rhode Island, US
- Genres: Punk rock, pop punk, ska punk
- Years active: 2004–present
- Labels: Paper + Plastick Records
- Members: Chuck Staton; Christian Staton; Abe Correia; Matt Kelley
- Past members: Kevin Silva; Tom Wells; Alan Sousa; Eric Macksoud
- Website: www.seniordiscountmusic.com

Senior Discount is an American punk rock band from Providence, Rhode Island. Their music blends punk with pop-punk influences. Apart from music, the band has also ventured into film and podcasts. Its lineup consists of lead vocalist and guitarist Chuck Staton, bassist and back-up vocalist Abe Correia, lead guitarist and back-up vocalist Matt Kelley, and drummer Christian Staton.

== Albums ==
- There Were Four Who Tried - Senior Discount's debut album (August, 2006)
- ...And That's Goodbye - an EP (May, 2009)
- Is This the End? - an EP (Dec, 2012)
- ...And That's Goodbye (Deluxe) - a deluxe re-released EP (June, 2017)
- "The Christmas Medley" - a single (December, 2017)
- The Best Revenge - an LP (July, 2018)

== Reviews ==
- AbsolutePunk.net – "Every track from the album is an anthem to punk rock’s principles" (about Senior Discount's debut album, There Were Four Who Tried...)
- The Noise (Boston) - "This DVD is gold and that the band and those with them have some mighty winds at their sails." (about Senior Discount's documentary, VBW Attack!)
- Maximum RockNRoll (California) - "These guys can rock and scream...a strong full-length." (about Senior Discount's album, There Were Four Who Tried...)
- Rock Is Life.com - "I was quite surprised, no shocked, at how great the latest release by Rhode Island’s Senior Discount was. This punk rock affair comes at you hard and heavy and never lets up till the very end." (about Senior Discount's album, There Were Four Who Tried...)
- Punk Online.co.uk – "An excellent album." (about Senior Discount's label debut, The Best Revenge)
- Behind Second Lines – "Senior Discount's new album should be blasted-full volume on the way to the beach! Don't sleep on this band or this album." (about Senior Discount's label debut, The Best Revenge)
- Breaking and Entering – “…Simple, yet effective melodies with hard driving guitars…undeniably the right formula.” (about Senior Discount's label debut, The Best Revenge)
- Dying Scene – “Honest, emotional, crazy, and fun punk rock!” (about Senior Discount's label debut, The Best Revenge)
- The Punk Site – “Senior Discount have an across-the-board appeal that few can match.” (about Senior Discount's label debut, The Best Revenge)

== Awards and notable accomplishments ==
- Best Punk/Garage Act - Providence Phoenix 2007 Best Music Poll
- Best Punk/Garage Act - Providence Phoenix 2008 Best Music Poll
- Semi-Finalists - 95.5 WBRU Rock Hunt 2008
- Winner: Best Comedy - Indie Gathering Film Festival (for Senior Discount's documentary, VBW Attack!)
- G4 bought footage from Senior Discount's film VBW Attack! and started airing the clips in early 2009
- Best Pop-Punk Band - Motif 2017 Motif Music Awards
- Senior Discount's song "Afterlife" opened the film Tell 'Em Steve-Dave!: Live at the Gramercy Theatre
- Best Pop-Punk Band - Motif 2018 Motif Music Awards
- In June 2018, the band got signed to Paper + Plastick Records by Vinnie Fiorello from Less Than Jake
