= Quit (band) =

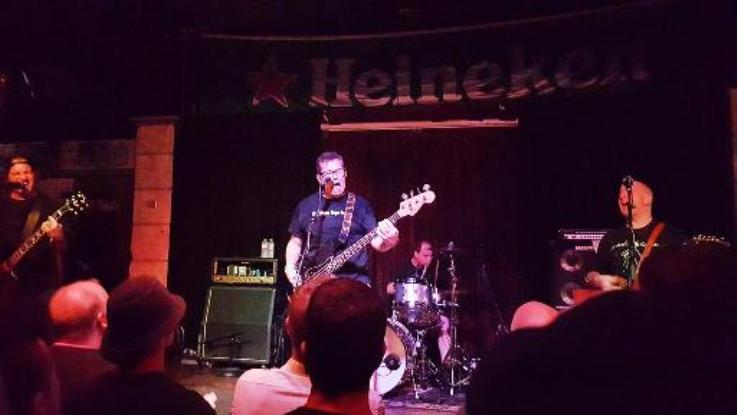
Quit Reunion Tampa, FL, Crowbar July 2015

Quit is an American pop punk band from Miami, Florida, United States, formed in 1988. The band was founded by Andre Serafini, Russell Mofsky, Antonio Rocha and Addison Burns. Quit has released one studio album and been on numerous compilations and one DVD compilation. Quit released Earlier Thoughts in 1990 when most of the members were 18 and 19 years old. Quit has played shows with Green Day, Helmet, and Fugazi. Quit has recorded over four full-length albums of material.

== History ==
Quit was part of the late 1980s to mid 1990s Miami music scene and local punk music scene. Band members hung out at skate ramps, surfed, and went to local shows and house parties mainly in one southern part of Miami. Quit was formed in the summer of 1988, when Andre Serafini and Russell Mofsky wanted to start a band. Andre played in a band, Chocolate Grasshopper, and Russell was playing with metal gods Cynic. They knew Addison Burns from the local skate scene and asked him to join. Omar Cuellar joined in on bass guitar. After a few months, Tony Rocha replaced Cuellar on bass, and Quit's first performance was on Labor Day weekend in 1988 for the Rock-A-Thon. Quit has had four full-time members since 1989: Andre Serafini on drums, Russell Mofsky on lead guitar, Addison Burns on lead vocals/rhythm guitar, and Tony Rocha on bass. Songs were written by band members, and they would work on the arrangements together. Quit released its first album, Earlier Thoughts, on Esync Records. Quit re-released Earlier Thoughts in 1996 on Rojo Records with two bonus tracks recorded live on the air from WLRN's Off the Beaten Path, an overnight punk radio program. Quit played consistently from 1988-1996.

There were some unfortunate events that occurred with Quit that affected the band's future. In 1992 Hurricane Andrew destroyed much of the warehouse that Quit used to rehearse, store their equipment and merchandise. In 1993 Addison fell off the roof of his house and broke his wrist. He was unable to play guitar for a year. In 1993, Quit recorded material for a new studio album but it did not materialize. Quit opened for Green Day during their Kerplunk tour. Additional members that have played in Quit are from bands such as Cell 63, Fay Wray (Rob Coe), Vacant Andys and King Friday.

== Earlier Thoughts ==
The album Earlier Thoughts was produced by Ralph Cavallaro while he was attending the University of Miami. He produced and managed Quit beginning as a student project. The executive producer was Rat Bastard (Frank Falestra). 2,000 units were released, including 500 cassette tapes, 500 compact discs and 100 vinyl LPs. Many of the vinyl LPs were damaged during the hurricane. Quit was one of the local Miami punk bands to release their album on compact disc.

== 1990-1993 ==
Quit continued to play shows and tour after Earlier Thoughts was released. In 1992 Quit recorded songs for a new studio album, Grazing Day. The album was not released.

== After 1996 ==
Quit toured across the U.S. for two weeks in 1999. In the summer of 2002, Quit played a couple of reunion shows in Miami.

In April 2015 Quit announced reunion shows. In July 2015, Quit performed at three concerts in Florida. Cities included Tampa, Gainesville, and Miami. This was the first time in 25 years that Quit performed live with the four members that recorded Earlier Thoughts. Quit is currently working on new material.

== Logo ==
The Quit logo has been well received since the band started using it in 1988. The logo was designed by Nancy Carlson who also contributed to the art layout on the Earlier Thoughts album. The design is similar to the Stüssy skate clothing line that was popular in the late 1980s and earlier 1990s.

== Relevant projects ==
Band members are active or have played in numerous bands including The Cold Ones, Adventures in Tourism, The Enablers, Fay Wray, and King Friday. Addison currently plays with Chris Wollard from Hot Water Music in Chris Wollard and the Ship Thieves. Russell formed and leads Gold Dust Lounge.

== Demos ==
- "Gettin' On Off It" 1988 — self-released

== Albums ==
- Earlier Thoughts 1990 - ESYNC OCULAR INTERCHANGE
- Earlier Thoughts 1996 - Rojo Records (re-remixed re-release of the 1990 record. Includes two bonus live tracks from their 1992 WLRN appearance).

== Compilations ==
- Reflex Magazine Split. Flexi-disc 6". 1990.
- Churchill's Hideaway Music Generated By Geographical Seclusion and Beer Live at the Square, Miami beach, Florida. ESYNC Records. 1993.
- Power From The Vault. Three tracks. Conquest Music Group. 1997.
- The Shortest Distance: A South Florida Compilation. 1999.
- Release. DVD compilation released by Victory Records. 1999.
- Pop Punk Fever. Nice Guy Records. 2003.
