= Mere Dead Men =

English punk band formed in 1986

Mere Dead Men (often called MDM) is an English punk band. Formed in 1986 from the break-up of a number of other punk bands, MDM have released several albums, toured the UK, and played in various venues across Europe (such as in the Czech Republic and France).

The band disbanded in 2011 after performing at their final show at the Rebellion Festival.

== Current members ==
- Mandy Shaw – vocals
- Rag – drums (now performing as marc..in electro punk goth duo, The Webb https://www.facebook.com/TheWebb.band?ref=hl )
- Richie – bass
- Rob – guitar

== Partial discography ==
=== Albums ===
Split album with Paradox U.k. Retch records

- Stacks, Stilettos, Make Up and Mohicans
- Carry On MDM
- United We Stand
- Let's Do It

=== EP ===
- Laced Up Mary
