= The Lost Boys Club =

Dutch pop-punk band

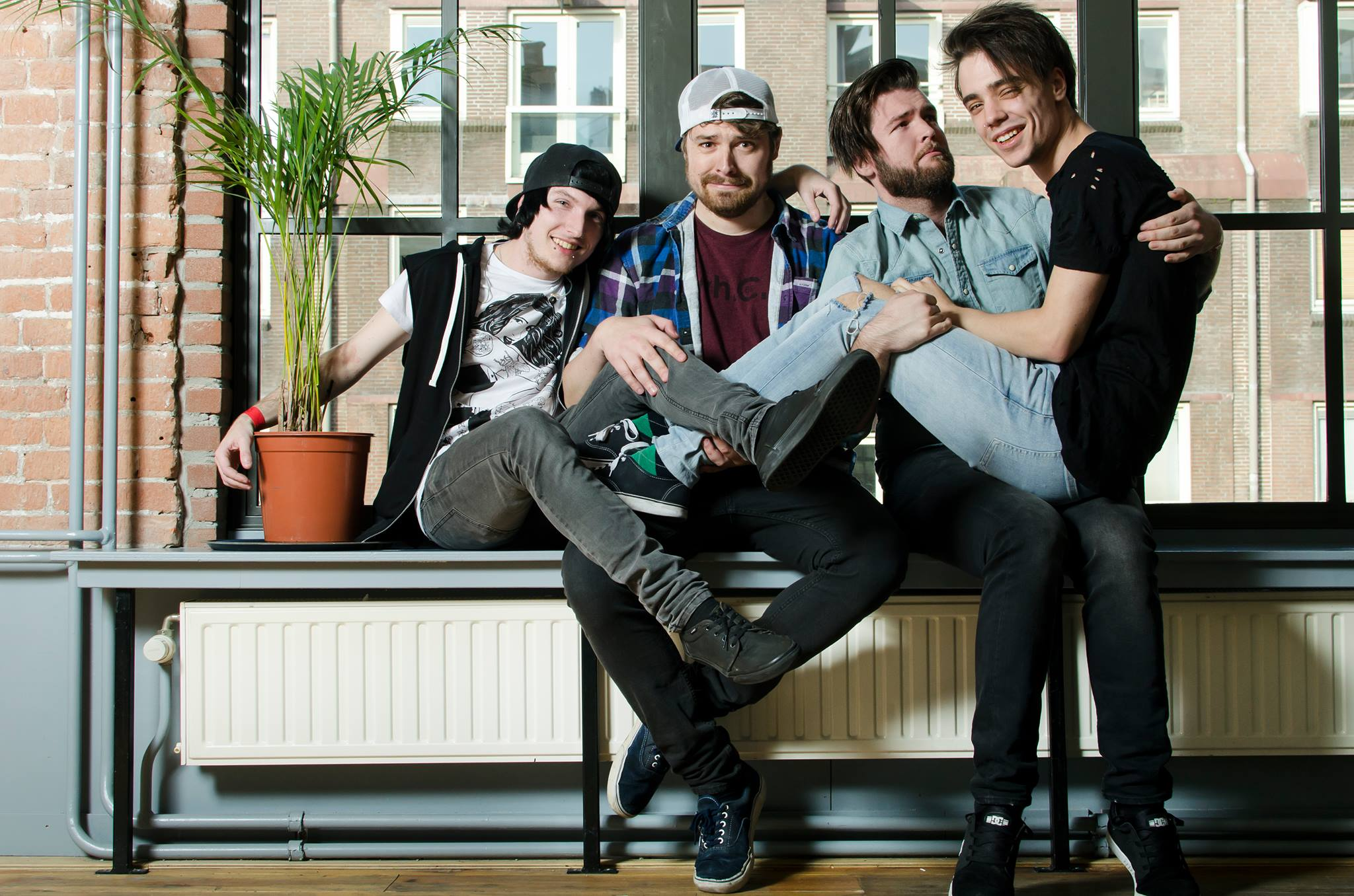
- The Lost Boys Club with Kenneth de Krieger

Background information
- Origin: Hilversum, Netherlands
- Genres: Pop punk
- Years active: 2012–2017
- Labels: Acuity.Music
- Members: Nick Brummer; Bas Frishert; Danny Bekker; Richard Robin
- Past members: Daan Brink (2012-2013); Bart Eijk (2012-2015); Kenneth de Krieger (2015-2016)
- Website: www.lostboysclub.net

The Lost Boys Club were a Dutch pop-punk band from Hilversum, Netherlands. Vocalist and guitarist Nick Brummer searched for new band members after the end of pop-punk band Good Things in September 2012, and he found those members in Bart Eijk, Daan Brink and Bas Frishert. On December 2 the band announced that Daan Brink won't be able to continue playing for The Lost Boys Club anymore. At December 10, The Lost Boys Club introduced their new drummer Danny Bekker, who was active as the drummer for the Dutch metalcore band Smash The Hourglass. The band is inspired by the melodies of bands such as Blink-182 and New Found Glory.

On January 23d the band announced parting ways with Bart, who had to stop playing for The Lost Boys Club due to different priorities. After Bart's departure, Kenneth Krieger joined the band on guitars and backing vocals. With Kenneth Krieger newly joined to the team, the band released their sophomore album "Hit The Deck!" gaining various reviews over the internet. With this album they returned to their pop-punk roots leaving most of their easycore influences behind. Shortly after the release, Kenneth and The Lost Boys Club parted ways as Kenneth wanted to pursue a different musical path. With long time friend of the band Richard joining the band on guitar, the band released two more singles (Selfie Queen & Last Goodbye). After playing one final Dutch tour, the band performed their final, sold out, farewell concert in Eindhoven in March 2017.

== History ==
The Lost Boys Club released their debut EP, From Here On After, on November 12, 2012.

On the 4th of October 2013, The Lost Boys Club released their new album So Far So Good through Acuity.Music. The record consists of 8 poppunk songs including a bonus track, which is only available for purchase via iTunes, Amazon or Spotify. Including guest vocals by former Rufio-frontman Scott Sellers on the track "When We Were Young" and from Who vs. Who's singer Ilah v/d Haas on the track "Lights".

== Personnel ==
- Nick Brummer - Vocals, guitar
- Richard Robin - Guitar, vocals
- Bas Frishert - Bass, vocals
- Danny Bekker - Drums

== Discography ==
=== Albums ===
- From Here On After EP (2012)
1. White Sharks Ate My Girlfriend
2. Too Far Gone (ft. Mick Tenthof)
3. Up & Go (ft. Chris Wurzburg, Forget Me In Vegas)
4. Farewell (ft. Chris Bauchle, former-Same As Sunday)
5. Screaming Watson And The Rat Of Confidence
- Last Christmas - Single (2012)
1. Last Christmas (Originally performed by WHAM)
- So Far So Good (2013)
1. Harry Potter And The Prisoner Of Marzipan. No, Azkaban!
2. I've Heard It Both Ways
3. So Far So Good
4. When We Were Young (ft. Scott Sellers, former-Rufio)
5. Lights (ft. Ilah v/d Haas, Who vs Who)
6. Walking With My Friends
7. It Takes Two To Tango
8. Never Looking Back
9. Walking With The Dead (Bonus)
- Cover It Up EP (2015)
1. I Almost Do (Originally performed by Taylor Swift)
2. All The Small Things (Originally performed by Blink-182)
3. Year 3000 (Originally performed by Busted)
- Hit The Deck! (2016)
1. A Place Called Home
2. That's A Good One
3. Anthem
4. Sorry, Not Sorry
5. Last Forever
6. Monuments
7. Stay The F*ck Out Of My Life Ft. Kenneth de Krieger
8. Not Alright
9. Setting Sail
10. Growing Up Is Giving In
11. Stuck In The Middle
12. The Part That I Hate
- Selfie Queen - Single (2017)
1. Selfie Queen
- Last Goodbye - Single (2017)
1. Last Goodbye
