= Shrapnel (Welsh punk band) =

Welsh punk band

Shrapnel was a punk rock band formed in 1981 in Briton Ferry, Wales. Among other accomplishments, the band toured Ireland with the British band Subhumans in 1984. In 1988 Shrapnel split an LP with Scottish band Toxik Ephex for the new Welsh label Words of Warning.

The band moved towards the anarcho scene, at the point they were encouraged to write an album, which never surfaced, they folded following their subsequent 1988 UK tour with San Francisco band Christ on Parade.

The band's lineup included Andrew Kingdom (vocals), Mark Rees (bass), Paul Summers (guitar), Ivor White (guitar) and Geoff James (drums).

== See also ==
- The Fibonaccis
