= The Wanton Looks =

American punk pop band

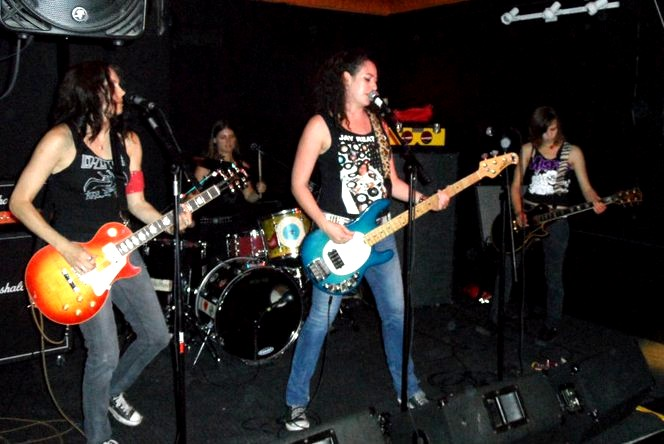
- L-R: Susie Q. Winn, Meg Thomas, Traci Trouble, Inga Olson

Background information
- Origin: Chicago, Illinois
- Genres: Pop punk, punk rock
- Years active: 2009-2013
- Past members: Traci Trouble, Meg Thomas, Inga Olson, Susie Q. Winn
- Website: wantonlooks.com

The Wanton Looks were a pop punk band from Chicago whose music has been described as reminiscent of Joan Jett's early 1980s work. They were called one of the best underground bands of 2011 by the Chicago Tribune and one of the best unsigned bands of 2012 by The Jivewired Journal. They have also been a featured artist on WXRT's "Local Anesthetic" program.

== Background ==
Bass player Traci Trouble and drummer Meg Thomas first met at a pool hall in Buffalo Grove, Illinois in 2006 and started writing songs together. They decided to form a band, but after ads on Craigslist failed to find suitable musicians, the pair met Inga Olson and she joined as the band's guitarist. They also found Susie Winn who joined as the second guitarist. The band played its debut concert at the Cobra Lounge in Chicago in 2009.

The band released its debut self-titled album on their own "Haughty Eyes" record label in March 2012 and it was named a "top indie album" by the Chicago Tribune.

Guitarist Susie Q. Winn left the band in December 2012 with the remaining members continuing as a three piece. In February 2013 Winn joined The Handcuffs, replacing Ellis Clark. The band continued as a trio for a while before eventually disbanding.

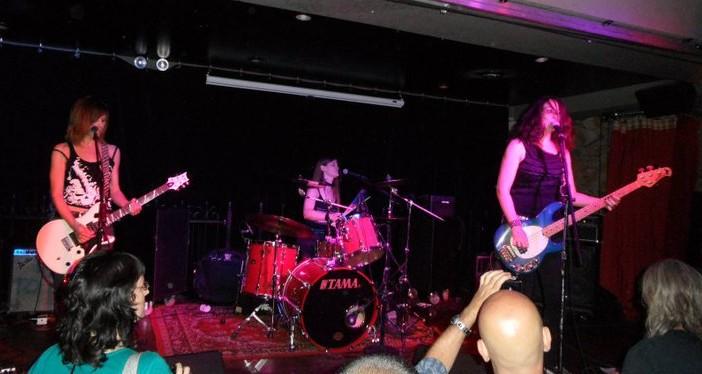
As a trio. Left to right: Inga Olson, Meg Thomas, Traci Trouble

== Band members ==
- Traci Trouble: Bass/Vocals
- Meg Thomas: Drums/Vocals
- Inga Olson: Guitar/Vocals
- Susie Q. Winn: Guitar/Vocals

== Discography ==
Electromagnetic Force

- Released: 2009
- Format: CD
- Label: Wanton Looks
- Tracks: "Electromagnetic Force", "Worst Side of Me", "Demons"

self-titled

- Released: 2012
- Format: CD
- Label: Haughty Eyes/Whoa! Records
- Tracks: "Electromagnetic Force", "Get Thru To You", "Yeah Yeah Yeah Yeah", "Worst Side Of Me", "86 Me", "All I Want Is You", "Demons", "All Your Fault", "Come On", "Used & Abused", "Forget You", "Neverending"

== Reception ==
- Named one of the best underground bands of 2011 by the Chicago Tribune
- Named one of the best unsigned bands of 2012 by The Jivewired Journal.
- "a little bit punk, a chunk of metal, some gleaming pop hooks, and a whole lot of attitude" - Greg Kot, Chicago Tribune (2012).
- "The Wanton Looks offer limitless potential and the talent and work ethic to go easily traverse above and beyond the benchmarks that they established in the past year." - Michael Canter, Jivewire Journal (2012).
- "Bad-girl harmonies (think Shangri-La’s) meet fuzzed-up guitar and relentless tempos... with fizzy hooks and towering sing-along choruses" - Greg Kot, Chicago Tribune (2009).
- "The Wanton Looks bring the heat — the guitars are detonative, the bass lines are aureate and those female voices resemble sirens" - Michael Canter, Jivewire Journal (2012).
- "This album is full of hooks and tight little punchy songs" - Jim Kopeny, Chicagoist (2012)
- "The Wanton Looks' debut is certainly the next best thing for your daily infusion of infectious pop with a bit of hard rock edge." - Audrey Leon, Loud Loop Press (2012)
- The band "combine metal virtuosity – 10-ton guitar solos, rampaging drums – with don’t-mess-with-me garage-punk attitude" - Greg Kot, Chicago Tribune (2012).
- Drummer Meg Thomas was named a "Rising Star" by DRUM! Magazine in 2010 and "Musician of the Month" in January 2013 by the Chicago Music Guide.
