= The Odorants =

Finnish punk band formed 1995

The Odorants are a Finnish punk rock band.

== Biography ==
The Odorants were formed in 1995 when members Jaska, Anssi and Rami met in high school in Nurmo. Jaska had a friend called Murkku in Seinäjoki and the four of them quickly formed the band. Rami and Anssi could already play their instruments but the other two had no experience. Murkku, being somewhat fluent in English, became the lead singer and bassist, with Jaska assigned the drumkit.

The band made their first demo in 1996 under the name "Butt First" featuring their first song "Meat Means Burger". Soon afterwards, the Canadian DIY label United Records signed the band and included the song "Stay Away" on their compilation "United We Stand Vol. 1" (1997). One condition of this was the band changing its name, which was when they became The Odorants.

Their first EP, "Tales from the Underground", was released in 1998 and the opening track "Not Over You" received national radio airplay. In 1999 United Records closed down, cancelling a planned Odorants tour in Canada & the northern US. Their second EP, "2.", was self-released in June 1999 with Anssi taking over from Murkku as lead singer. After this the band were inactive for a while, with Murkku moving to Helsinki, Jaska to Imatra and Rami to Tampere.

Since 2001 The Odorants were featured on the Finnish TV stations MoonTV and Nelonen in the Jackass-style series "Extreme Duudsonit", which is where their early recordings are mostly known from. Their third EP, "Sing When You Are Copulating" was released in the same year by The Odorants own record label Mörkö Records. 500 copies were pressed which quickly sold out.

In 2002 the band got their first major recording deal with BMG Finland. Their major label debut "Beat The Odorants" was released March 3, 2003. They also released two singles on BMG, "This Night" and "Late Night Call", the latter of which got some commercial radio play. Jaska, being an award winning movie director, directed the video for "This Night" and Rami animated the video for "Late Night Call". Their videos were shown on MTV but the band were later dropped by BMG.

== Discography ==
- 1996 - Butt First (demo), United Records
- 1998 - Tales from the Underground (EP), self-released
- 1999 - 2. (EP), self-released
- 2001 - Sing When You Are Copulating (EP), Mörkö Records
- 2003 - Beat the Odorants (album), BMG
- 2003 - This Night (single), BMG
- 2003 - Late Night Call (single), BMG
- 2007 - Counting Wolves (album), Moby Disc
- 2021 - When Tigers Used To Smoke (album), Harava Records
- 2024 - Love Songs Never Die (album), Striped Records

== Members ==
- Anssi Odorant - vocals and guitar
- Jaakko Odorant - drums
- PC Odorant - bass
- Fester Odorant - guitar and backing vocals
- Murkku - bass ( Ex-member )
- Rami - guitar ( Ex-member )
