= Pueblo Criminal =

- Origin: Zurich, Zurich, Switzerland
- Genres: Ska, punk, reggae, Latin music
- Years active: 2006–present
- Labels: 808 Records / Leech Music
- Members: Chriss; Pipo; Neyman; Victor T Millo; Viero; MR Sax; Gabriela; Maxim
- Website: pueblocriminal.ch

Pueblo Criminal is a Swiss ska-punk-band from Zurich with reggae and Latin music influences consisting of ten members. The band arose in 2006 out of the hardcore formation Chlambrüd.

== History ==
Pueblo Criminal arose in 2006 out of the hardcore formation Chlambrüd consisting of the five members Viero (guitar), Victor T (bass), Chriss (vocals), Pipo (organ) and Neyman (drums). Due to a musical reorientation towards ska-punk with influences of reggae and Latin music, the band has been augmented steadily. In 2006, alto and baritone saxophonist MR Sax and trombonist Gabriela joined Pueblo Criminal.

After some first experiences at the Basel City Studios in 2001 with Chlambrüd, the recordings of the debut album Bang Gang of Pueblo Criminal were started in 2006 at the band's own studio in Schwerzenbach ZH. By the end of August 2009, all tracks were recorded. After this long work, Pueblo Criminal went to the Red Led Studios in Madrid, where producer Tony López (Ska-P) and audio engineer Rubén Suárez finalized the CD in December 2009. Almost at the same time, the band was completed by trumpeter Sam and second guitarist Millo.

In October 2010, Bang Gang was released as CD and download. After several gigs in Switzerland, Pueblo Criminal was invited for a small tour of Düsseldorf and Bochum in November 2010. At the beginning of December 2010, the formation played at Eulachhalle in Winterthur as a support act for Ska-P. On 7 December, the CD release party of Bang Gang took place at the Mascotte club in Zurich, where the band won the "4th Band-Cover-Contest" two months later.

In summer 2011, Pueblo Criminal played at many festivals as at the Heitere Open Air in Zofingen and Imagine Festival in Basel. After the two-week tour of Costa Rica in July 2011, the band could gain a foothold in Central America.

In 2014, the second album Two Faces was released after an intensive creativity phase of songwriting and recording.

At present, Pueblo Criminal is working on new songs, which will be ready towards the end of 2021.

== Band members ==
- Chriss – lead vocals
- Pipo – stage organ, lead vocals, accordion
- Neyman – drums, percussion
- Victor T – bass
- Millo – guitar
- Viero – guitar, backing vocals
- MR Sax – alto and baritone saxophone
- Gabriela – trombone
- Nick - drums
- Maxim – trumpet

== Discography ==
=== Studio albums ===
- Bang Gang (2010)
- Two Faces (2014)
