= Rabid (band) =

English punk rock band

- Origin: Leicester, England
- Genres: Punk rock
- Years active: 1979–1986, 2013
- Labels: Fall Out
- Members: Dean Grant; Steve Ward; Colin Bennett; Gaz Johnson
- Past members: Nick Edwards; Paul Rayner; Keith Penny; Troy; Steve Aucott; Max Millgate
- Website: www.rabidapparel.co.uk

Rabid are a punk rock band from Leicester, England, initially active between 1979 and 1986. A new lineup of the band was reformed in 2013.

== History ==
Rabid formed in 1979, undergoing several line-up changes before settling on Nick Edwards (vocals), Dean Grant (bass), and Paul Rayner (guitar), and Keith Penny (drums). After recording a 5-track demo in 1981, they released their debut EP, Bloody Road to Glory, on their own 'Blank Label' imprint. The EP was a hit in the UK Indie Chart after receiving airplay from John Peel in his BBC Radio 1 show, reaching number 47, and it also reached No. 14 in the NME Punk chart. After the EP's distributor, Fresh, went out of business, owing money to Fall Out Records, Fall Out reissued the EP later in 1982.

Rabid appeared on national British television in 1982 on Newswatch U.K. and in a Canadian documentary on the youth of England. During 1983 they played on the same bill as bands such as G.B.H., The Exploited, and the U.K. Subs. Fall Out issued the band's next release, the 8-track Bring Out Your Dead 12-inch mini-LP, which reached number 45 in the indie chart in 1983, and No. 10 in the NME Punk Chart. By 1983, Rayner had been replaced. The final line-up of the band had Grant joined by Troy (vocals), Steve (guitar), and Max (drums), this line-up recording the tracks "Bloody Road to Glory" and "Black Cat", which were included in the Punk Lives! - Let's Slam compilation in 1986. A third track, "Destined to Decay" was recorded but not included. The band split up in 1986.

In 2006, Fall Out released a 12-track CD collection of the band's work, as Bloody Road to Glory, adapting the artwork from the original EP.

Grant formed a new lineup of the band in 2013 with Grant himself on vocals, Steve Ward on bass guitar, Colin Bennett on guitar, and Gaz Johnson on drums. A new compilation, Bloody History was released in August 2013. Rabid played numerous shows in 2014 supporting GBH, 999, Vice Squad, Drongos for Europe, and Broken Bones, and headlined shows in Leicester, Derby, Boston, and Birmingham, with a three date tour of Germany planned for early 2015 and possibly dates in France.

Rabid signed to Underdogz Records in February 2016 and are due to release Frankenhooker this spring 2016, an 11-track album.

== Discography ==
=== Singles, EPs ===
- Bloody Road to Glory EP (1982) Blank Label/Fall Out
- All the Way to the Bank Bitch (2014)

=== Albums ===
- Bring Out Your Dead mini-LP (1983) Fall Out
- Bloody Road to Glory CD album (2006) Fall Out
- A Bloody History (2013)

=== Compilation appearances ===
- Punk Lives! - Let's Slam LP (1986) Slam, included "Bloody Road to Glory" and "Black Cat"
- Rot Records Punk Singles Collection Anagram, includes "Bloody Road to Glory"
- Fall Out Punk Singles Collection Anagram, includes "Jubilee"
