= Pimpbot =

PIMPBOT
- Live at Red Lion Waikiki, Honolulu

Background information
- Origin: Waikiki, Hawaii, U.S.
- Genres: Rock, Ska, Reggae
- Years active: 2001–2015
- Labels: Pass Out Records
- Members: Fernando Pacheco; Tom Coleman; Rylan Yee; Eric Lagrimas; Cathy Lagrimas
- Past members: Joel Tokunaga; Shannon Ogura; Alex Nagata; Chris LaPan; Mike Lewis; Ray Farias; Nicolas Ramos; Christian Ramos; Jesse Tinker
- Website: http://pimpbotband.wixsite.com/pimpbotband

PIMPBOT was an American ska punk band from Honolulu, Hawaii, United States. It was formed in 2001. Blending influences of reggae, dance-rock, hardcore punk, and rocksteady, the band was a local favorite, playing at many Honolulu venues. Pimpbot performed at the world-famous Wave Waikiki at the closing celebration, headlined the grand opening of the stage at Kemo'o Farms, and the popular Sunset on the Beach event at Waikiki Beach.

The band also toured across the State of Hawaii, the U.S. mainland, Asia and Canada, including two appearances at indie music's prestigious South by Southwest Festival in Austin, Texas. In their travels they gained national and international acclaim and have shared the stage with: Train, Orianthi, Third Eye Blind, Candlebox, Reel Big Fish, The Toasters, Less Than Jake, The Ataris, Warsaw, General Public featuring Dave Wakeling, The Aquabats, Save Ferris, Buck-O-Nine, Go Jimmy Go, The Aggrolites, The Skeletones, Skaladdin and the One Man Ska Band - Chris Murray.

== Members ==
The band was composed of:

- Fernando "The Love Machine" Pacheco (lead vocals, trombone, tuba)
- Tom "Tommy Utah" Coleman (guitar, vocals)
- Rylan "Big Sexy" Yee (bass guitar, keyboard)
- Eric "The Biz" Lagrimas (drums, recorder, tenor sax)
- and Cathy "Kat von Keys" Lagrimas (keyboard, trumpet, vocals)

Past members included:

- Joel Tokunaga (guitar)
- Shannon Ogura (bass)
- Alex Nagata (drums)
- Chris LaPan (backing vocals, drums)
- Mike Lewis (bass)
- Ray Farias (tenor sax)
- Nicolas Ramos (trumpet/backing vocals)
- Christian Ramos (keyboard)
- Jesse Tinker (tenor sax)

== Tours ==
- "Stuck In The Middle Tour"- Summer 2012- dates including Las Vegas, Denver, Durango, Omaha, Des Moines, Chicago, Minneapolis
- "East Coast Bender Tour"- February 2011- 4 dates including Washington, DC and New York City. A planned show in Boston, MA had to be cancelled due to the unexpected closing of a venue.
- "Armed Forces Entertainment Asia/ Pacific Tour"- September 10 to 20, 2009- 8 dates including Anderson Air Force Base, Guam; Naval Base Guam; The Fuji Festival at Camp Fuji, Japan; Camp Walker, South Korea; Daegu AFB, South Korea; Yongsan Garrison, South Korea; and two dates at the Camp Kinser Festival, Camp Kinser, Japan.
- "Muy Caliente Tour" - March 13 to 25, 2009- 5 Dates including Riverside, Hollywood, Las Vegas, and March 20 and 21 @ the 2009 South by Southwest Festival in Austin, Texas
- "Admit One" Canadian Tour- March 2008- including shows in Winnipeg, Calgary, Edmonton, and Vancouver
- "Rock from the Rock Tour" - Western US, Fall 2006 - 9 dates: Los Angeles, San Diego, Riverside, Reno, San Francisco, Portland, Tacoma, Seattle
- "Vertical Lobster Tour" - Southern California & Nevada, Fall 2004 - 7 dates including Boulder City's Outdoor Music Festival, The Skelo-Ween Show, and The Aloha Party @ Hoover's Live
- "Coconut Monkey Tour" - Southern California, Summer 2003 -5 dates including The Bluebeat Lounge @ the Knitting Factory, The Garage, and the Flippin Fiesta

== Honorable mentions ==
Pimpbot was named as a finalist for several Na Hoku Hanohano Awards, the Hawaii recording industry's regional equivalent of the Grammy Awards. Pimpbot has also been a finalist in the Hawaii Music Awards, an awards program that was open to public voting worldwide, and which is no longer active.

- Album: PIMPBOT - 2012 Na Hoku Hanohano Award Nominee for Best Rock Album
- Single: "Careless Whisper" - 2006 Hawaii Music Awards Nominee for Best Single
- Single: "Thanks For The Eggs" - 2008 Hawaii Music Awards Nominee for Best Single
- Album: Admit One - 2009 Hawaii Music Awards Nominee for Best Ska Music Album and 2009 Na Hoku Hanohano Award for Best Rock Album

== Discography ==
- "Demo Mucho Supremo" (2003, Self-Released)
- "Vertical Lobster" (2004, Self-Released)
- "Roots, Rock, Reggae: Hawaiian Islands" Compilation (2005, Hawaiian Express Records)
- "Send Ska!: Hawaii's Best of 2004" Compilation (2004, Gardenia Lane)
- "Careless Whisper" Single (2006, Self-Released)
- "Thanks for the Eggs" Single (2007, Pass Out Records)
- "One Life At A Time" Compilation (2007, Pass Out Records)
- "Songs On Egg Nog" Christmas Album (2007, Pass Out Records)
- "Admit One" (2008, Pass Out Records)
- "PIMPBOT" (2011, Pass Out Records)
- "The Heavy Crown" (2015, Pass Out Records)
