= German punk =

German appreciation of, and contributions to, punk music genres

German punk includes a body of music and a subculture that have evolved since punk rock became popular in Germany in the 1970s. Within the subculture of punk in Germany, a style of music called Deutschpunk was developed; this style of music has developed distinctly from hardcore punk, and includes lyrics in German as well as a fast tempo. In the punk scene in Germany, some bands play music in the Deutschpunk style, while other German punk bands pursue various other styles of punk music.

== History ==
=== 1976 to 1981 (Origins of punk in Germany) ===
The first punk bands in Germany were strongly influenced by U.K. and U.S. bands like the Sex Pistols, The Damned, The Clash, The Stooges, and the Ramones. Among the first wave of German bands were Big Balls and the Great White Idiot (from Hamburg, founded in 1975), Male (from Düsseldorf, founded in 1976), Tollwut (from Munich, founded in 1976), PVC (from West Berlin, founded in 1977), Fred Banana Combo (from Düsseldorf, founded in 1978), Clox (from Dortmund, founded in 1977), and Pack (from Munich, founded in 1978). Early German punk groups were heavily influenced by UK bands, often writing their lyrics in English. For example, Big Balls, PVC, Clox, Pack, and the Fred Banana Combo wrote lyrics in English. Male is generally considered to be the first punk band to write lyrics in German. "The significance of the shift cannot be understated: as Male vocalist Jürgen Engler pointed out even at the time, 'German lyrics led to the development of a new genre.' " This first wave of German punk bands tended to be made up of people who were musicians before they encountered punk, rather than people motivated by political activism to form bands and learn to play instruments.

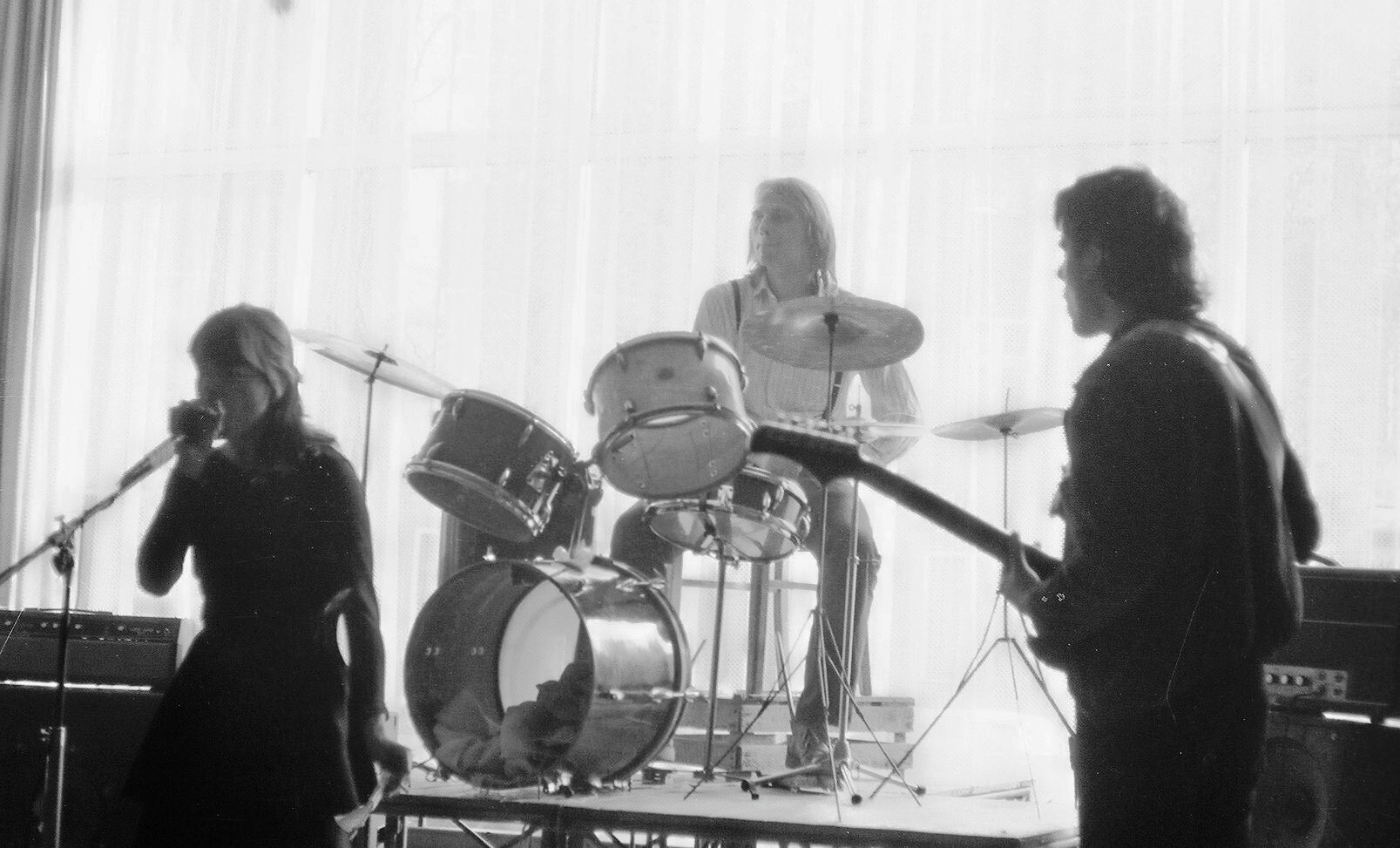
East German punk band

Notable early Germany punk bands also include Charley's Girls, S.Y.P.H., Mittagspause, Din-A-Testbild, Strassenjungs, Stuka Pilots, Deutsch-Amerikanische Freundschaft (DAF), Weltaufstandsplan (der Plan), Hans-a-plast, Kriminalitaetsfoerderungsclub (KFC), the Buttocks, ZK, Materialschlacht, and Minus Delta t. Although they played music in the punk style, Big Balls and the Great White Idiot (Hamburg) and Strassenjungs (Frankfurt), were strongly promoted by the music industry as the first German new wave groups, and were not generally accepted as part of the punk scene.

The SO36 club (named for the postal code in its location in Berlin-Kreuzberg) was opened in August 1978. Its grand opening was celebrated with the "Mauerbaufestival", which included performances of The Wall, Dub-Liners, Mittagspause, Male, S.Y.P.H., Din-A-Testbild, Ffurs, Stuka Pilots, and PVC. This was associated with the LP compilation S.O.36 Sampler - Live 13.8.78. The SO36 became a well-known fixture of the punk music scene in Germany.

One of the first scandals in the German punk scene happened in 1979, when singer Nina Hagen discussed masturbation techniques during an appearance on the discussion program Club 2, produced by the radio broadcaster ORF. This controversial appearance quickly made her famous. Her debut album Nina Hagen Band (1978), which had just been released, achieved international recognition. This album included a German version of the classic song from The Tubes "White Punks on Dope" (published under the title: "TV-Glotzer").

At this point in history, at least in Germany, there were not many ways to release records outside of the standard music business. This included a business-run music press, and limited possibilities for performances. The only nationally distributed music journals that were inclusive of the new punk scene were Sounds (largely to the credit of music journalist Alfred Hilsberg), the magazine Spex (founded in 1980) which consisted most of photos, and Musikexpress. In fact, a letter to Sounds by the band Male in 1977 signaled the arrival of German punk to the international music scene. These first years of the punk scene in Germany were characterized by the lack of infrastructure; records were self-produced, and advertised by word of mouth. In the late 70s, a number of punk bands were founded that had roots in left-wing political movements, and that sang only in German. They were associated with protests against nuclear-power plants, as well as the squatter's movement in Germany. After early punk albums were released entirely on cassettes, the growing punk movement founded the first independent music labels. These labels included Rock-O-Rama, ZickZack Records, as well as a number of short-lived record labels. Der Ostrich from Düsseldorf is generally considered to be the first punk fanzine from Germany; its first issue was released in March 1977, and its last issue was released in 1979. The people running Ostrich also founded the band Charley's Girls. Other early German punk zines from West Germany included: Heimatblatt, Der Arsch, Preiserhöhung, KZ-Rundschau, and Der Aktuelle Mülleimer.

Around 1980, several different sounds diverged in the German punk scene. Centered in Düsseldorf there was a larger movement toward electronic music. These bands originally performed alongside punk bands but became the precursors of Techno music. This included bands like DAF and Weltaufstandsplan (der Plan).

Other bands began experimenting with sound using synthesizers and computers, developing a sound that was a precursor of the Neue Deutsche Welle (NDW). This included bands like Fehlfarben, Ideal, The Nina Hagen Band, Östro 430, Abwärts, and Trio. This sound was influenced by punk but oriented toward the commercial pop-music scene. NDW would develop further and reach the highpoint of its commercial success in the 1980s.

Around 1979, people began to differentiate between the early punk sound, music that was evolving into NDW, and a sound developed by younger punk bands that had a harder, more aggressive style. Bands like S.Y.P.H., der KFC, and Mittagspause were also viewed as a different genre from more commercial bands like Hubert Kah and Nena. At the same time a new set of bands were being founded, for example ZK and Soilent Grün, that developed a sound and marketability which would lead to commercially oriented punk bands like Die Toten Hosen and Die Ärzte.

=== 1982 to 1989 (The rise of Hardcore and Fun-Punk) ===
Song lyrics written by the second generation of punks differed from the contemporary German youth culture and also from Hippie culture. Politically motivated punks were often involved in the squatter scene; for example, members of Vorkriegsjugend lived in squatted houses in West-Berlin. At this time the Do-It-Yourself (DIY) culture lead to the foundation of many record stores and record labels, such as Your Choice Records. Also during this period, alcohol became a central part of the punk subculture in Germany.

In 1981, the labels Aggressive Rockproduktionen (Berlin), Weird System (Hamburg), and Mülleimer Records (Stuttgart) released records that became milestones of the genre Deutschpunk. Bands such as Hass, Slime, Razzia, Neurotic Arseholes, Canal Terror, Beton Combo, Normahl, Toxoplasma, ZSD, and Daily Terror redefined punk in Germany with their engaging political lyrics, motivated by Germany's Nazi past, the anarchist movement, police violence, working-class desperation and squatter's rights, immigration issues, racism, sexism, and the Cold War. Many of these bands are still active today. Popular compilations of this period were "Keine Experimente!" (Vol. 1–2) (Weird System Recordings) and "Soundtracks zum Untergang" Vol. (1-2) (Aggressive Rockproduktionen). The Munich punk sampler "Muenchen: Reifenwechsel Leicht Gemacht" (Lächerlich! Schallplatten) was released in 1981. The Munich fanzine Upstart was founded by Peter Wacha, and other fanzines were put out by the Munich group Freizeit 81 as early as 1981. The first issue of the long-running punk fanzine "Trust" was released in July, 1986. Ox-Fanzine was founded in 1988.

Aggressive Rockproduktionen released the compilation "Soundtracks zum Untergang" volume 1 in 1980. In 1981, this compilation cd was banned and copies were confiscated and then censored because of "Verunglimpfung des Staates und seiner Symbole" (English translation: "Denigration of the state and its symbols"), a reaction to the lyrics in Slime's song "Polizei SA/SS" and Middle Class Fantasies' song "Helden". Middle Class Fantasies and Slime thus became the first bands to have their songs banned in Germany. The Slime songs "Deutschland" and "Wir wollen keine Bullenschweine" were also later banned because they promoted the use of violence against the police, and because they compared the police to the SA and SS of Nazi Germany. In part due to this notoriety, Slime became the most well-known Deutschpunk band.

In 1983, the Hannover police began an organized action against punks and skinheads targeted toward public safety and public order. As a reaction, punks organized the Chaostage (English translation: "chaos days"), a gathering or festival with the aim of attracting media attention. The first official Chaostage were held on July 1–3, 1983 in Hannover; precursors, generally called Punktreffen (English translation: "punk gatherings"), were held in 1980–1982 in Wuppertal and Duisburg. Additional Chaostage also took place in Hannover in 1984 and 1985.

Around 1985/1986, the active part of the punk movement – those that organized concerts, wrote fanzines, and founded music labels – began to revolve more strongly around American Hardcore. During this period, many bands were influenced by U.S. hardcore punk with bands such as Black Flag and The Adolescents. Those bands were also known for their left-wing attitude and aggressive musical styles. Some of the most important German hardcore punk bands are also often labeled as "Deutschpunk", including Vorkriegsjugend from West Berlin, Chaos Z from Stuttgart, Inferno from Augsburg, Spermbirds from Kaiserslautern, Bluttat from Mülheim an der Ruhr, and Blut + Eisen from Hannover. Other bands developed a slower, more melodic style, inspired by American bands like The Wipers; among such bands were Torpedo Moskau from Hamburg and a number of singer Jens Rachut's bands, like Angeschissen (1986), Blumen am Arsch der Hölle (1992), Dackelblut (1994), and Oma Hans (2000) from Hamburg.

Near the end of the 80s, there was a short wave of popularity for Fun-Punk (also known as punk pathetique). Bands like Abstürzende Brieftauben from Hannover, Die Mimmi's from Bremen, Die Goldenen Zitronen from Hamburg, Die Ärzte from West Berlin, and Schließmuskel ("sphincter") from Hamminkeln had a left-wing attitude, but their lyrics were not particularly political. Some of these bands became popular outside the punk scene, but were often criticized by the punk scene for being too trivial, and too focused on drinking culture (German: "Sauferei"). During this period, the band Die Toten Hosen from Düsseldorf was founded. Along with Die Ärzte, the Hosen became the most commercially successful and well-known German punk band, gaining significant international recognition. During this period die Ärzte and Abstürzenden Brieftauben released records on major labels.

In the beginning of the 1980s, a skinhead movement developed out of the early punk scene. The music associated with the skinhead scene was largely inspired by the U.K. Oi! music scene. The skinhead fanzine and label Scumfuck was founded and developed a longer battle with the fanzines Trust and the hardcore-oriented fanzine Zap. Alongside well-known skinhead bands like the "Herbärds" and "Die Alliierten", an extreme-right music scene developed around bands such as "Kraft durch Froide" and "Endstufe". Musically, these bands played in the punk style, but they developed a separate scene around Rechtsrock. A precursor of this scene was the Cologne Label Rock-O-Rama, which in 1984 released Der nette Mann from Böhse Onkelz, Hail the New Dawn from Skrewdriver, and other records that dominated the skinhead music scene.

The small punk scene that developed in East Germany in the 1980s was underground, and largely disapproved of as an import from the West. Because cassette tapes were expensive in East Germany, it was difficult for punk bands to make recordings. In the last few years of the GDR, some punk bands applied for and received licenses to allow them to perform in state-sanctioned venues; they were often criticized for cooperating with the government. Before German reunification, few East German punk bands were able to release albums. Albums were released in West Germany by East German bands L’Attentat (Leipzig) and Schleim-Keim (under the alias Saukerle). Beginning in 1989 a few East German punk bands released albums on the Berlin label Amiga Records; this included Die Skeptiker and Feeling B. The West German band Die Toten Hosen also released records in the GDR on Amiga. In the late 80s in East Germany, the first punk fanzines began to be produced, including: Alösa (East-Berlin, 1986), Messitsch (Leipzig, 1987), Trash (Rostock, 1989), and Rattenpress (Freiberg, 1989).

=== 1990s (The Punk Scene after Reunification) ===
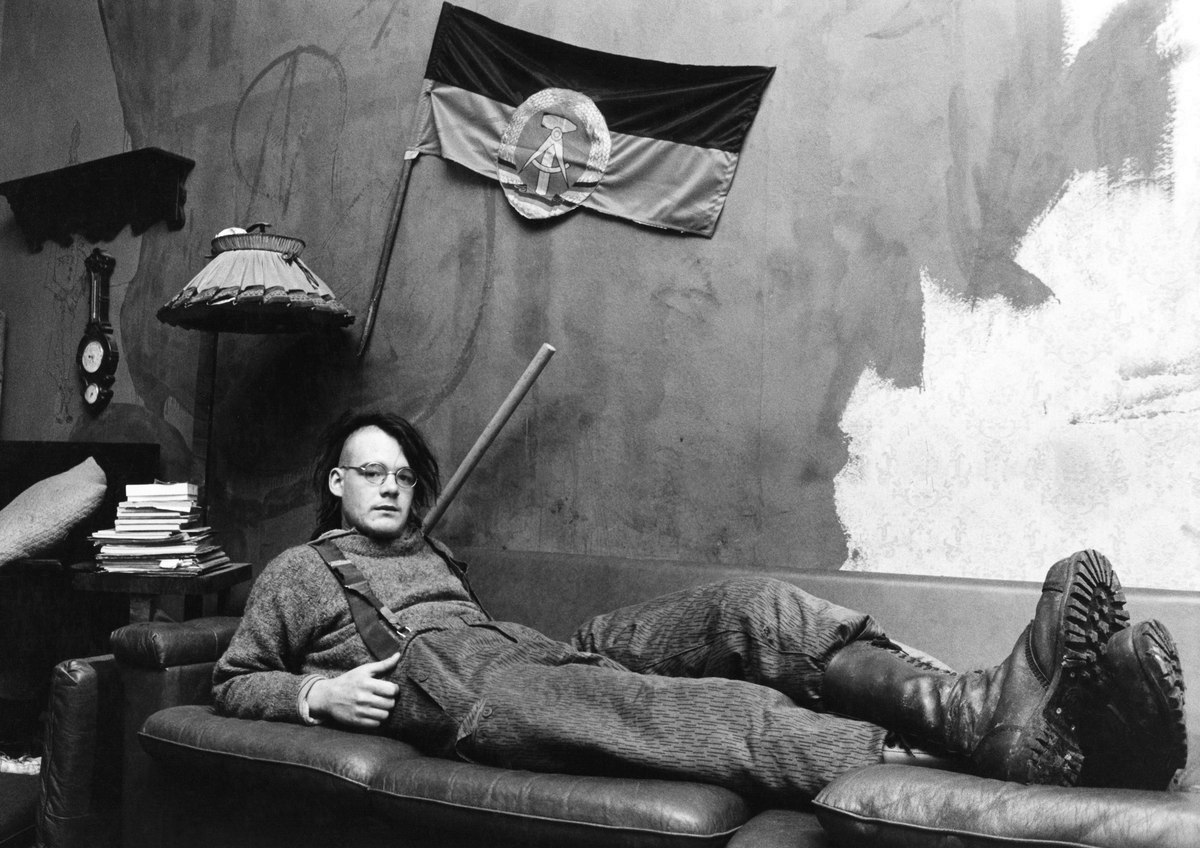
An anarchist punk in a squat after German reunification with a torn flag of East Germany on the wall

After German Reunification, East German punk bands who had had little chance to release records quickly began contributing to the greater punk scene. One of the immediate results of this was the 1990 compilation album Sicher gibt es bessere Zeiten, doch diese war die unsere, which included: Sonnenbrille, Schleim-Keim, Papierkrieg, Ich-Funktion, Müllstation, Ugly Hurons, Ulrike Am Nagel, Atonal, Kaltfront, Wartburgs Für Walter, Staatenlos, Haf, Paranoia, and Totalschaden. These compilations featured East-German bands, and seven volumes were produced by 1998; several of the later volumes included well-known bands like Dritte Wahl. In 1989 the compilation album "Parocktikum - Die Anderen Bands" was released, which included the well-known bands Feeling B, and Die Skeptiker from East Berlin; Parocktikum was an East German radio program, and die anderen Bands is a term for East German alternative bands, often critical of the East German government, that were active during the last few years before German Reunification. Additional underground punk bands in the GDR included: Abraum, Andreas Auslauf, Antirott, Anti X, Arbeitsgeil, Brechreiz 08/15, Die fanatischen Frisöre, Die Firma, Die letzten Rechen, Freygang, Grabnoct, Größenwahn, H.A.U. (Halbgewalkte Anarchistische Untergrundorganisation), Hert.Z., Küchenspione, KVD, Namenlos, Rattheads, Restbestand, Wutanfall.

A popular series of West-German punk compilation cds produced during this period is "Schlachtrufe BRD" (Vol. 1–8). The fanzine "Plastic Bomb" was founded in 1993.

After the German reunification in 1990, the political situation in the east of Germany changed dramatically, and far-right groups became more active. There were attacks against immigrants; the best known of these are the Rostock-Lichtenhagen riots in the summer of 1992. During the following years, punk rock experienced a renaissance in Germany. Bands formed in the 70s and 80s, like Slime, Toxoplasma, and Ausbruch reformed and released new, very successful records. This wave of neo-Nazi activity was referenced in many new albums. For example, Slime released the LP "Schweineherbst" in 1994; the title track of this album is a furious polemic against politicians and citizens who ignore the dangers of neo-Nazis in Germany. Many other German punk bands addressed Rostock-Lichtenhagen and the Hoyerswerda riots, including: Die Goldenen Zitronen ("Die Bürger von Hoyerswerda", "Das Bißchen Totschlag"), Toxoplasma ("Krieg", "Schwarz Rot Braun"), Atemnot ("Menschlichkeit"), Die Toten Hosen ("Sascha"). The Rostock punk band Dritte Wahl later wrote the song "Brennt Alles Nieder" about the riots. Bands like …But Alive, the Boxhamsters, Dackelblut, EA80, and 1. Mai 87 brought a new momentum to the scene and influenced a new generation of popular punk bands like Turbostaat, Muff Potter, Schrottgrenze, Betontod, Fahnenflucht, Knochenfabrik, Der Dicke Polizist, Rantanplan, and Pascow. The so-called Hamburg School of popular music grew, which produced bands like Tocotronic and Die Sterne. Eventually the popular rock band Kettcar was formed by former members of …But Alive.

At the same time, punk bands that used humor became very popular. In this category are WIZO and the Terrorgruppe. At the same time bands like Die Lokalmatadore and Die Kassierer, whose lyrics dealt with themes like alcohol and sex, also grew in popularity. New Fun-Punk influenced bands formed, including Die Lokalmatadore from Mülheim an der Ruhr, and Die Kassierer from Bochum.

Labels like Nasty Vinyl, Impact Records, Suppenkazper, and Höhnie Records realized they could profit from this wave of punk musicians and released a large number of records. Labels like Wierd System continued to be active and re-released classic records, as well as producing compilations on particular themes.

In 1994, 1995, and 1996 a new series of Chaostage was organized in Hannover. These Chaostage resulted in riots, and the destruction of cars and buildings. WIZO spontaneously played a show at the Chaostage in 1994, and later wrote a song about the experience titled "Chaostage 94". Terrorgruppe wrote a classic song about the Chaostage as well, titled "Wochenendticket", named after the kind of train ticket that most punks used to travel to Hannover. In October 1995, as a retaliation for the Chaostage, police stormed houses that punks were squatting in the Heisenstraße in Hannover, evicted the squatters, and tore down the houses. In response, the punk community in Hannover put out a compilation album "Heisenstraße: Es bleibt ungerecht aber nicht ungerächt ..." on the punk label AC-Records. On this compilation, the song "Häuserkampf" from the band A.A.K. (Autonomes Anruf Kommando) was particularly appropriate to the theme.

In the 90s the punk subgenres of riot grrrl and queercore were established in the United States. The band Parole Trixi (founded in Hamburg in 1998) contributed to riot grrl music, writing songs with German lyrics. The queercore band Low-End Models (founded in Munich in 1996) wrote songs with English and German lyrics; they played with American queercore bands Tribe 8 and Pansy Division at shows in the US and Germany.

=== 2000s (Punk in the New Century) ===
Beginning in 2003, the record label Weird System documented some aspects of punk history with the compilation series "Punk Rock BRD" (Vol. 1–3). Weird System also reissued the 1983 compilation "Waterkant Hits" that included bands like Razzia and Koma Kombo, among others.

Fanzines Plastic Bomb, Trust and Ox-Fanzine, that were founded as scene publications made the leap into the normal magazine market. Younger zines like Slam "Taugenix" (founded in 2007) reported on the German punk scene, while Spex has focused more on the Alternative-scene. The fanzine Away from Life was founded in 2015. Since the widespread use of the internet, fanzine culture has transformed into punk webportals and fan-pages.

The first "Force Attack" festival took place in 1997 in Barth; this festival continued to take place through 2011. The "Punk im Pott" festival in Essen / Oberhausen began in 1999, and has continued through 2022. 2023 is the 20th iteration of the "Punk and Disorderley" festival in Berlin. In 2021, when Angela Merkel left office, she chose Nina Hagen's song "Du hast den Farbfilm vergessen" to be played at her farewell ceremony. This song has been covered by many bands, but notably recently recorded in a harder style in 2020 by Radio Havanna (founded in Suhl in 2002) and East German band Dritte Wahl.

In this period, Slime produced three new albums, that are considered to be among their best: "Sich fügen heißt lügen" (2012), "Hier und jetzt" (2017), and "Wem gehört die Angst" (2020). Razzia also released the new album "Am Rande von Berlin" (2019) for the 40th anniversary. WIZO released Punk Gibt's Nicht Umsonst! (Teil III) (2014) and "Der" (2016).

Today there continue to be new punk bands in Germany, who write music in many different styles of punk, and are very popular. Such recently founded bands include: Die Grimmelshäuser (founded in Wallis in 2006), Jennifer Rostock (founded on the island Usedom in 2007), Kontrollpunkt (founded 2013 in Düsseldorf), Cold Kids (founded in Bamberg and active 2015–2018), Schnapps (founded in Wernigerode, actively producing albums since 2020), and Parkpunk (founded in Regensburg in 2022).

== Literature ==
(Listed by publication date;)

- Paul Ott und Hollow Skai (Hrsg.): Wir waren Helden für einen Tag. Aus deutschsprachigen Punk-Fanzines 1977-1981. Reinbek bei Hamburg, 1983, ISBN 3-499-17682-3.
- Martin Büsser: If the kids are united. Von Punk zu Hardcore und zurück. republication of expanded text. 1995, ISBN 3-930559-19-6.
- Moses Arndt: Chaostage. Ventil Verlag, 1998, ISBN 3-930559-54-4.
- Gilbert Furian, Nikolaus Becker: Auch im Osten trägt man Westen. Punks in der DDR – und was aus ihnen geworden ist. Thomas Tilsner Verlag, 2000, ISBN 3-933773-51-2.
- Jürgen Teipel: Verschwende Deine Jugend. Ein Doku-Roman über den deutschen Punk und New Wave. Frankfurt am Main, 2001, ISBN 3-518-39771-0 (= Suhrkamp Taschenbuch 3271).
- Dirk Buck: Teenage Wasteland. Thomas Tilsner Verlag, 2002, ISBN 3-933773-60-1.
- Jan Off: Vorkriegsjugend. Ventil Verlag, 2003, ISBN 3-930559-88-9.
- Angela Kowalczyk: Negativ und Dekadent – Ost Berliner Punk Erinnerungen, BoD GmbH, Norderstedt, 2003, ISBN 3-8311-2939-8.
- Karl-Heinz Stille: Punk Rock BRD – Companion to the CD compilation of the same name from Weird System Records.
- Rocko Schamoni: Dorfpunks. Rowohlt Tb., 2004, ISBN 3-499-23618-4.
- Eva Bude: Verpisst euch!. Europa Verlag, 2005, ISBN 3-203-75526-2.
- Ronald Galenza und Heinz Havemeister: Wir wollen immer artig sein. Schwarzkopf und Schwarzkopf, 2005, ISBN 3-89602-637-2.
- Frank Apunkt Schneider: Als die Welt noch unterging. Ventil Verlag, Mainz, 2007, ISBN 978-3-931555-88-7.
- Philipp Meinert, Martin Seeliger: Punk in Deutschland – Sozial- und kulturwissenschaftliche Perspektiven. Transcript, 2013, ISBN 978-3-8376-2162-4.
- Mirko Hall, Seth Howes, and Cyrus M. Shahan, eds.: Beyond No Future: Cultures of German Punk. Bloomsbury Publishing USA, 2016. ISBN 9781501314087.
- Philipp Meinert: Homopunk History: Von den Sechzigern bis in die Gegenwart. Ventil Verlag, 2018, ISBN 9783955750947.
- Geralf Pochop: Untergrund war Strategie-Punk in der DDR: Zwischen Rebellion und Repression. Hirnkost, 2018, ISBN 3945398835.
- Tim Mohr: Burning Down the Haus: Punk Rock, Revolution, and the Fall of the Berlin Wall. Algonquin Books, 2019. ISBN 1616208430.
- Aimar Ventsel: Punks and Skins United: Identity, Class and the Economics of an Eastern German Subculture. Berghahn Books, 2020. ISBN 978-1-78920-860-3.
- Jeff Hayton: Culture from the Slums: Punk Rock in East and West Germany. Oxford University Press, 2022. ISBN 9780198866183.

== Documentaries ==
- "No Future – Kein Bock auf Illusionen" WDR documentary 1981
- "SLIME - Wenn der Himmel brennt" 2004
- "ostPUNK! too much future" a documentary film directed by Michael Boehlke, produced by Jens Meurer, Germany 2006.
- "Mia San Dageng - Punk In München" - a documentary film about the Munich punk scene in the 1970s and 1980s, 2008
- "Jong'r" - a documentary film about the band Normahl and the history of German punk, 2010
- "Weil du nur einmal lebst - Die Toten Hosen auf Tour" 2019
