= Pascow =

German punk band

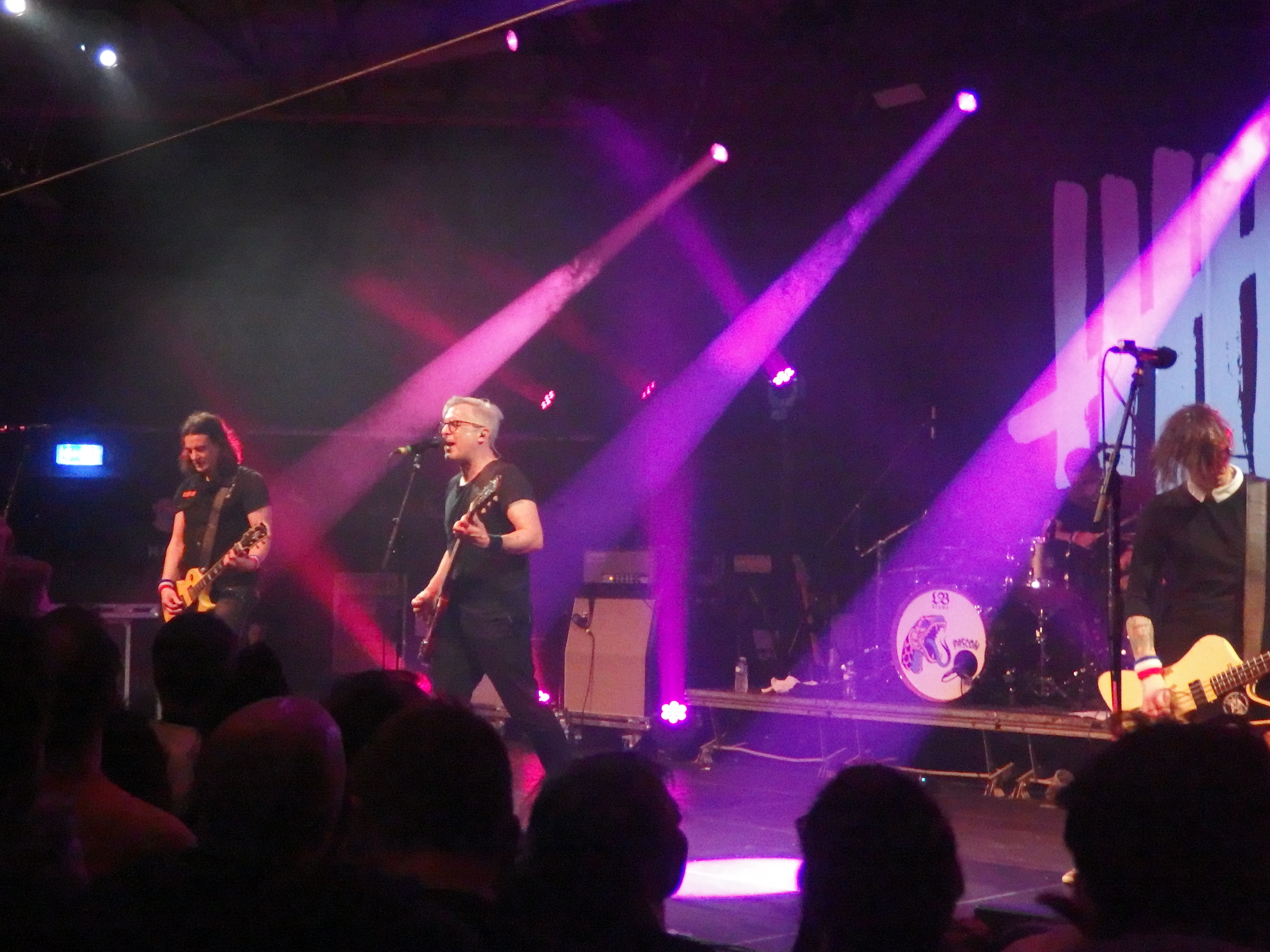
- Pascow playing the release show for their album Sieben on February 4, 2023 at the Garage, Saarbrücken

Background information
- Origin: Gimbweiler, Germany
- Genres: punk rock, Deutschpunk
- Years active: 1998-present
- Labels: Plastic Bomb, Rookie Records
- Members: Alex Pascow (Alexander Thomé) (guitar, vocals); Swen Pascow (since 2001, guitar); Flo Pascow (since 2008, bass); Ollo Pascow (Oliver Thomé) (drums)
- Past members: B.B. Blinn (until 2004, bass); Bieber (bass, 2004–2008)
- Website: www.pascow.org

Pascow is a German punk band from Gimbweiler in Rheinland-Pfalz founded in 1998. Pascow has released seven studio albums. Their first three albums were released on the Plastic Bomb label, associated with the fanzine of the same name. Their last four albums have been released on the indie label Rookie Records, which has also released records from Spermbirds, Bambix, and Love A. Their most recent album, Sieben, reached 5th place in the German album charts in 2023.

== Style ==
Pascow has its musical roots in the German punk scene, which is defined by fast-paced music and German-language lyrics. In particular, Pascow's lyrics have been influenced by Deutschpunk bands like Knochenfabrik, Duesenjaeger, Turbostaat, and Dackelblut, as well as the later work of Die Goldenen Zitronen. Musically they have also been influenced by The Misfits and the Ramones, as well as later bands like Gluecifer, Turbonegro, and Turbo A.C.'s. Early on, the band called their musical style "Bukowski-Pop", because they were influenced by the work of the writer Charles Bukowski. A direct reference to the work of Bukowski is found in the album title Geschichten, die einer schrieb... (English translation: History that someone wrote).

Their album Geschichten, die einer schrieb...was noted for its metallic production value. In the album Nächster Halt gefliester Boden Pascow's song writing became more mature and multi-sided. In addition, the band's sound became harder and more aggressive than earlier albums. In the album Diene der Party their lyrics became more direct and melancholy; the music became more melodic.

== History ==
The band's name comes from the Stephen King novel Pet Sematary, in which there is a character named "Victor Pascow". The band was founded by brothers Alex und Ollo Thomé in 1998 in the village of Gimbweiler, where they still have their practice room today. Other members of the band come from the Landkreis St. Wendel. The band members use the band name as their last names, as has become typical in the punk scene, following the example of the Ramones. In 1999, the band released their first demo cassette The Charles Bronson Gay Club; this demo included some songs with English-language lyrics. The band founded the independent record label Kidnap Music to release their records. In parallel with this label, they started the record store Tante Guerilla.

Pascow worked closely with the record label associated with the fan zine Plastic-Bomb to release their first three albums. Pascow's debut album Richard Nixon Discopistole was released in 2002, and included the hit Trampen nach Norden. In 2004 the bass player Bieber (formerly of folk-punk band Across the Border) joined Pascow. With Bieber, Pascow produced their next two albums: Geschichten, die einer schrieb... and Nächster Halt gefliester Boden.

In 2008 Flo joined the band as bass player. At the same time Pascow changed record labels from Plastic Bomb to the label Rookie Records from Cologne. In 2010 they released the album Alles muss kaputt sein.

On February 28, 2014, Pascow released the album Diene der Party (English translation: "Serve the party"). Along with the usual digipack and LP versions of the album, they produced a limited edition box-set (500 produced) that included a book and mp3-version of the album, along with the LP. The book contained the song lyrics for the album, and also short stories from underground writers, including Jan Off, Alex Gräbeldinger, Chris Scholz, and Pascow-fans. This box-set was sold out before the album release date. The band seldom tours, but plays a large number of one-off concerts, in particular in the Ex-Haus in Trier. They also play gigs at Festivals, for example Punk im Pott and Force Attack.

In early 2019, Pascow released their sixth album Jade, which was the first album of theirs that reached the German album charts; it rose to place 47. The album included many Star Wars references. After they produced the DVD Lost Heimweh the band underwent a restructuring. This included the way that they write song lyrics. Singer Alex Pascow described this: "Es ging nicht darum, unseren Stil über den Haufen zu werfen, aber wir wollten im Rahmen unserer Möglichkeiten alles ein Stück weit klarer machen. Damit lassen wir auch die Hosen runter und machen uns etwas angreifbarer. Aber wenn wir über Liebe singen, muss es ganz klar sein und wenn wir über Politik singen, muss es auch ganz klar sein." (English translation: "It wasn't about throwing away our style, but we wanted to make everything a bit clearer, in the framework of our possibilities. So we dropped our pants and made ourselves vulnerable to attacks. But when we sing about love, that should be very clear, and when we sing about politics, that also has to be very clear.")

In 2023 Pascow released their seventh album, titled Sieben (English translation: Seven). This album rose to 5th place in the German album charts in the first week that it was released.

== Discogrophy ==
=== Albums ===
1. 2002: Richard Nixon Discopistole (LP/CD, Plastic Bomb/ Kidnap Music)
2. 2004: Geschichten, die einer schrieb... (LP/CD, Plastic Bomb/ Kidnap Music)
3. 2007: Nächster Halt gefliester Boden (LP/CD, Plastic Bomb/ Kidnap Music)
4. 2010: Alles muss kaputt sein (LP/CD, Rookie Records/ Kidnap Music)
5. 2014: Diene der Party (LP/CD/Boxset, Rookie Records/ Kidnap Music)
6. 2019: Jade (CD/LP, Rookie Records/ Kidnap Music)
7. 2023: Sieben (CD/LP, Rookie Records/ Kidnap Music)

=== EPs ===
- 2001: Pascow (7"/MCD, Kidnap Music)
- 2006: Die Rote Suzuki & Pascow (Split-7" + Disco PS Fanzine)

=== Other Releases ===
- 1999: The Charles Bronson Gay Club (MC, Demo, Kidnap Music)
- 2005: Schief gescheitelt, schlecht rasiert (download album)
- 2012: Split Pascow/ Spermbirds (7" Single, Rookie Records)
