= Common Thread =

Common Thread may refer to:

- Common Thread (The Oak Ridge Boys album), released in 2005
- Common Thread (Spermbirds album), released in 1990
- Common Thread: The Songs of the Eagles, released in 1993

== See also ==
- A Common Thread, 2004 French film
- Common Threads (disambiguation)
