= Dritte =

- Dritte (meaning "third" in the German language) may refer to:
- The Third (film) (original title Der Dritte), 1971 German film
- Dritte Wahl, a German Punk rock group from Rostock in the former East Germany
