= Big Balls =

Big Balls may refer to:

== Music ==
- "Big Balls", a song from the album Dirty Deeds Done Dirt Cheap by AC/DC
- Big Balls, an album by Big Balls and the Great White Idiot

== Entertainment ==
- Big Balls, an obstacle in the game show Wipeout
- Bigballs Media, the owner of COPA90

== People ==
- Edward Coristine, an American software engineer and political figure with the pseudonym "Big Balls"
