= EA80 =

German punk band

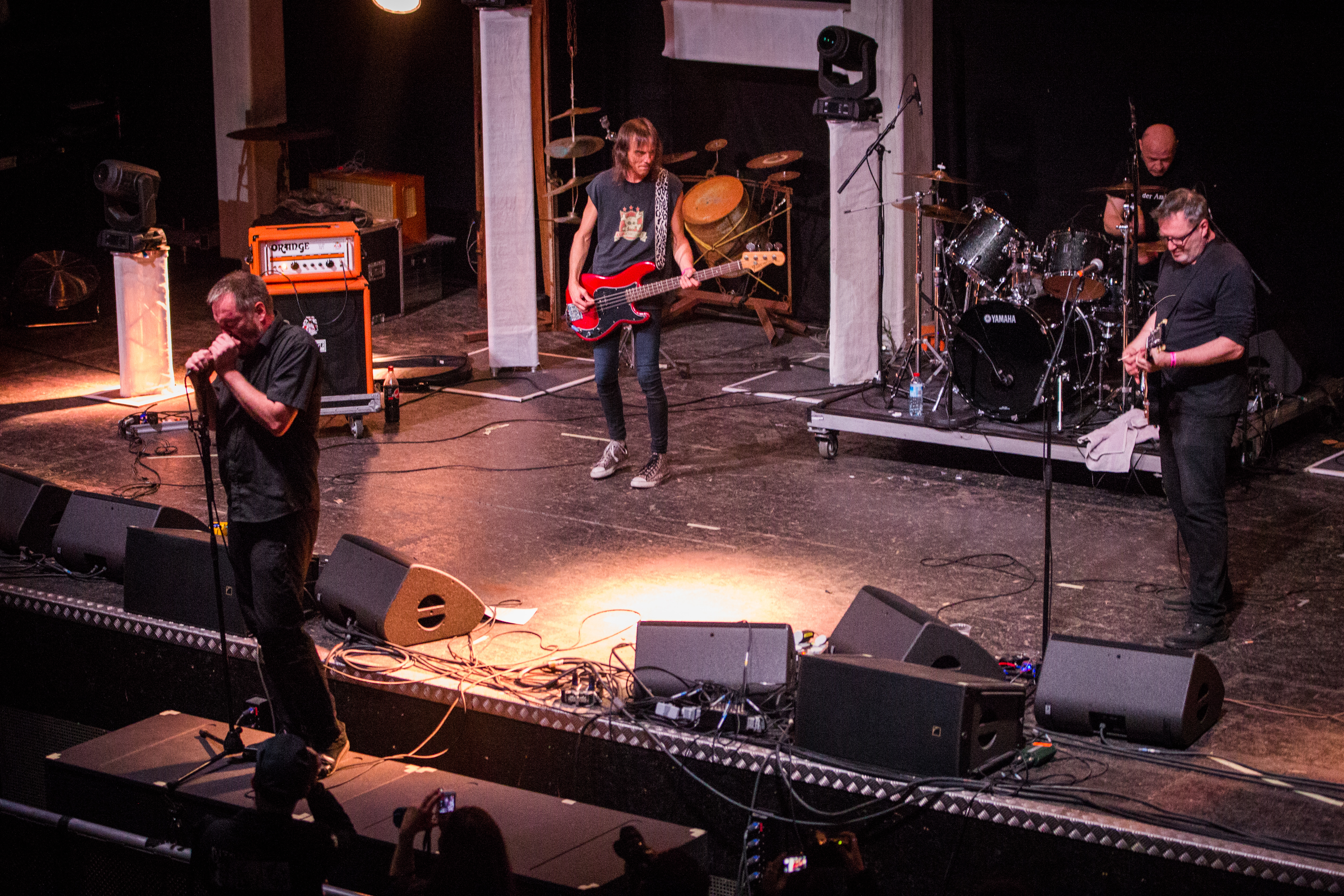
- EA80 play the Maschinenfest in the Turbinenhalle Oberhausen, October 14th-16th, 2016

Background information
- Origin: Mönchengladbach, Germany
- Genre: Deutschpunk
- Years active: 1979—present
- Label: Major Label
- Members: Junge (vocals, guitar); Hals Maul (guitar); Philipp (bass); Nico (drums)
- Website: www.ea80.de

EA80 is a German punk band founded in Mönchengladbach in West Germany in 1979. EA80’s music includes sophisticated lyrics that are written in German and rarely rhyme. As a matter of principle, the band produces no merchandise or promotional material. Since the beginning of the 1990s, they have given few interviews. When they have granted interviews it has been on the condition that no recording of the interview be made and that their answers will not be directly quoted. On the band's official website, there only appears the name of the band, and no further information. They prefer to advertise their rare concerts only with local flyers and by word of mouth, and have usually been able to sell-out concerts that way.

EA80 have been continuously active since their founding and have released 14 studio albums. Their albums are self-released because they object to contracts with record labels. However their albums have been re-released and distributed by the German indie label Major Label, which has also released albums from the Boxhamsters, Razzia, and the East German punk band L'Attentat. Their albums are highly regarded, and have been reviewed in Maximum Rocknroll, Die Tageszeitung, and Ox Fanzine. Their album Zweihundertzwei (also written 202), released in 1990, was listed in Musik Express' 2023 "50 best punk albums of all time". EA80 was featured in the 2016 book Beyond no future: cultures of German punk. They were also mentioned in the 2022 book Culture from the Slums: Punk Rock in East and West Germany.

== History ==
When the band was first founded in 1979, they named themselves Panzerfaust. In 1980, they changed the band name to EA80. The band members include: lead singer Karl Martin Kircher, who goes by the pseudonym Junge, guitarist Thomas Hütten, who goes by the pseudonym Hals Maul, bass player Oddel (since 1991), and drummer Nico von Brunn (since 1982). In the time that the band has been active, the line up has only changed twice: both the bass player and drummer have been replaced.

EA80 has said that it is a "lazy band"; they feel no pressure to bring the next album out, sometimes practice only twice in a month, and take a long time to finish songs. They often make mistakes when playing concerts, and have no problem with that, because they do not want to be a professional band. Depending on their mood, a concert can last 3.5 hours, or only half an hour. Hals Maul is quoted as saying "Weiterentwicklung ist evil" (English translation: "Further development is evil"). This refers to EA80's effort to maintain its original sound and style.

For the 40th anniversary of the band, EA80 released the album 40, which includes tapes from their practice room at the time the band was founded.

== Outside projects ==
Junge has pursued solo projects under the names Killer and Killerlady. He is a member of the band Die Böse Hand, which also includes two members of the band the Boxhamsters. Junge also belongs to the band The Devil in Miss Jones. He was in the band Pechsaftha, which included members of the band Klotzs und grafzahl as well as the author Martin Büsser.

Hals Maul is also a member of the band Serene Fall and the band Troops of the Sun.

Nico is also a member of the band Panikraum, which includes the singer Alexander Strafe from Die Strafe.

== Discography ==
=== Studio albums ===
1. Vorsicht Schreie (1983)
2. 2 Takte später (1985)
3. Mehr Schreie (1987)
4. Licht! (1989)
5. Zweihundertzwei (1990)
6. Schauspiele (1992)
7. Grüner Apfel (1995)
8. Schweinegott (1998)
9. Alle Ziele (2001)
10. Vorsicht Schreie 2004 (re-recorded in 2004)
11. Reise (2007)
12. Definitiv: Nein! (2011)
13. Definitiv: Ja! (2017)
14. ● ● (Stecker) (2024)

=== Other releases ===
- Jungen + Technik (1981, MC, Auflage: 30)
- Der Mord fällt aus (1982, erste 7")
- Geburtstag (1987, 7", Auflage: 100)
- Dezember (1989, 7")
- 20 (1989, 7", Auflage: 200)
- Punk (1991, MC, 1993 als CD)
- Boxhamsters Split (1992, 7")
- III (1992, double CD, includes the albums "2 Takte später", "Mehr Schreie", and "Licht!")
- Gladbach soll brennen (1995, 7")
- Carsten Vollmer-Split (1998, Auflage: 667)
- Hinter den Dingen (2000, 10")
- Klotzs vs. EA80 Split (2000, 7")
- Züri brennt (2002, 7")
- Little Drummer Boy (2002)
- Unser Gießen (Die 5. Jahreszeit) (2003)
- EXXX (2004)
- 25 (2004, 7“)
- Mixtape (2008, 7")
- Unser Gießen (2010, 5", split EP with Die Strafe)
- Happy Grindcore Split - Electro Napalm Hippie Death (2014, 7", Auflage: 500)
- 40 (2019, CDr, limited pressing)
- EA80 - EA80 (2019, Box with 7 x 7“, only 600 pressed)
