= Jingo de Lunch =

Jingo de Lunch is a German punk band from Kreuzberg, Berlin. They formed in 1987, releasing five albums before temporary disbanding in 1996.

== Biography ==
=== Prehistory ===
Most members had a solid musical background. Vocalist Yvonne Ducksworth (a Canadian who arrived in Germany in 1983) had previously sung in Combat Not Conform. Guitarist Sepp Ehrensberger had played in the Berlin cult punk rock band called Vorkriegsjugend (1984–85). Ehrensberger and Ducksworth played together in Manson Youth. Ehrensberger and Tom Schwoll (guitar) had played in Zerstörte Jugend. Duckworth, Ehrensberger and Schwoll gave birth to Jingo de Lunch in April 1987, with Steve Hahn on drums and Henning Menke on bass.

=== First run ===
In 1987 Jingo de Lunch released their debut album Perpetuum Mobile, three months after their first rehearsal. Their second LP, Axe To Grind, was recorded in 1989.

With their third album Underdog, they took a new artistic direction and moved away from their underground roots by signing with the major record label, Phonogram Records. Two other albums released were B.Y.E and Deja Voodoo, before they broke up in 1996. Jingo de Lunch toured in Europe and played with The Ramones, Bad Brains, Die Toten Hosen and Bad Religion.

After they split, Steve Hahn worked as a roadie for Toten Hosen and Beatsteaks. Tom Schwoll, who left the band in 1994, played with many other bands which included Extrabreit, Kumpelbasis, Sin City Circus Ladies', Die Skeptiker and The Subjects. Henning Menke played with Ojo Rojo from 1999 onwards, and he also played with Church Of Confidence, and Die Skeptiker. In 2005 he joined Skew Siskin. Ehrensberger played in various other bands such as like Bad Brians, 'Riff Raff and Bomb Texas. Ducksworth went to live in Arizona, United States from 1996 to 2006, but she did not take part in any band.

=== Reunion ===
In 2006, Jingo de Lunch played two reunion shows at the White Trash Fast Food in Berlin. In 2007, they released The Independent Years: a compilation album with songs from their first two albums; plus a cover version of Subhumans' "Fuck You", and the rare 12 inch "Cursed Earth".

In September 2007, they celebrated their 20th anniversary as a band by touring in various cities of Germany and Italy. In early 2008, Ehrenseberger left the band, and was replaced by Tico Zamora.

At the end of 2009, Schwoll and Zamora left the band, and were replaced by Gary Schmalzl. In early 2010, they played six shows in Germany. In October 2010, they released a new album, Land of the Free-ks. Then, they toured Germany and Europe.

In September 2011, they released a live album "Live in Kreuzberg" recorded at the Lido in Kreuzberg (Berlin)on 25 November 2010.

In 2012, they had 5 concerts in Germany. They officially broke up in September 2012. Their last show was at the Ruhrpott Rodeo Festival on 26 May 2012.

== Current members ==
- Vocals : Yvonne Ducksworth
- Guitar : Gary Schmalzl
- Drums : Steve Hahn
- Bass : Henning Menke

=== Previous members ===
- Guitar : Sepp Ehrenseberger (1987-1996 then 2006-2008)
- Guitar : Tom Schwoll (1987-1994 then 2006-2009)
- Guitar : Tico Zamora (2008–2009)

== Discography ==
=== Albums ===
- 1987 Perpetuum Mobile (We bite Records)
- 1989 Axe To Grind (Hellhound)
- 1990 Underdog (Vertigo, Phonogram)
- 1991 B.Y.E (Vertigo, Phonogram)
- 1994 Deja Voodoo (Vertigo)
- 2010 Land of the Free-ks (Noise-O-Lution.)

=== Mini LP ===
- 1988 Cursed Earth (12") (Bonzen Records)

=== Maxi CD ===
- 1990 Crawl (Phonogram)
- 1994 Dogs Day (Phonogram)

=== Compilations and live ===
- 2007 The Independent Years (Rookie Records)
- 2011 Live in Kreuzberg (Noise-O-Lution.)

== Reception ==
Jingo de Lunch are regarded as a forerunner of crossover music: mixing punk, hardcore, hard rock and rock.

Ox-Fanzine praised the production of the band's early work, comparing them to Bad Brains and Dag Nasty. Over calling Jingo de Lunch an important part of early German hardcore music history.
