= Chaos Days =

Former annual German punk gathering

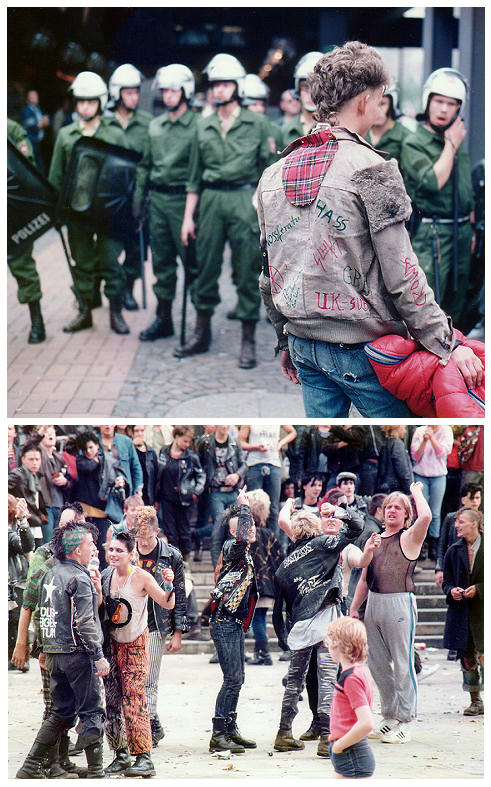
Two images from Chaos Days 1984

Chaos Days (German: Chaostage) was an annual punk gathering, often violent, held in Hanover, Germany starting in 1982 and revived in the mid-1990s.

== History ==
In 1982, after several punk meetings in Wuppertal, considered forerunners of Chaos Days, the first Chaos Days occurred in Hanover. The gathering was intended to protest a police plan to create a reference library of photographs of German punks. Thereafter, "official" Chaos Days were held in 1983, 1984, and 1985.

The most well-known Chaos Days took place in August 1994, 1995 and 1996. In 1995, 2,000 punks and squatters fought with police, resulting in over 100 injured police officers and 450 arrested young people. The program had listed: "Friday 3 pm: Street fights. Saturday 11 am: Games with fire. Sunday: Glass-breaking demonstration." The result was riots and the destruction of cars and buildings. Two supermarkets were looted. These "chaos days" were the main topic of TV debates and newspapers for several weeks. Terrorgruppe wrote a now-classic song about the Chaostage titled "Wochenendticket" (released as a single in 1996), which is named after the train ticket that most punks used in order to get to Hanover from all across the country. The popular band WIZO spontaneously played a show at the Chaostage in 1994; they later wrote the song "Chaostage94" about this experience, which appeared on their 2016 album Der. The band Church Of Independent Assholes (CIA) rewrote the classic Rio Reiser song "König Von Deutschland" and included a reference to the Chaostage in it.
