= Dritte Wahl =

German band

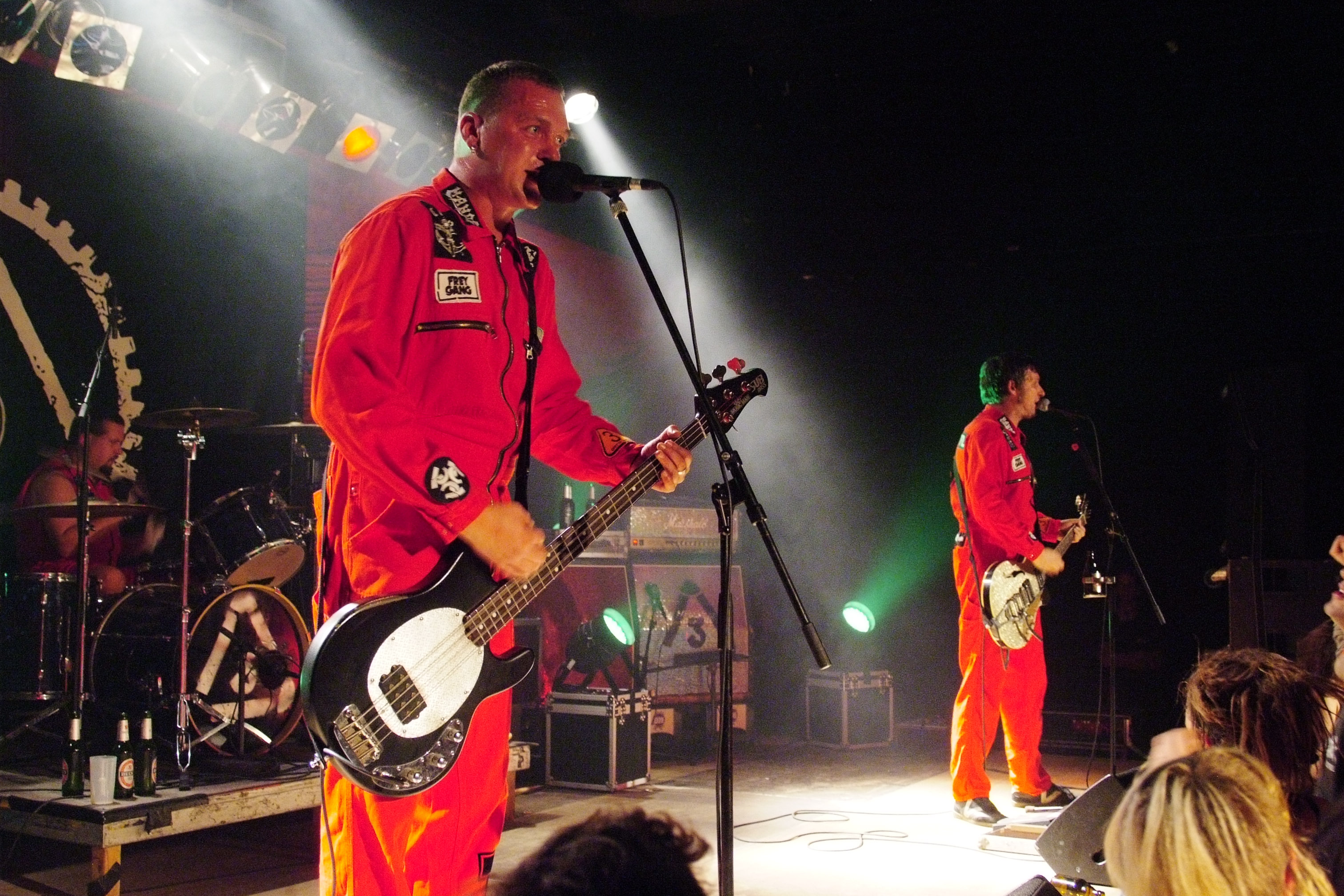
- Dritte Wahl at a concert in Kiel in 2009

Background information
- Origin: Rostock, East Germany
- Genres: German punk, Crossover
- Years active: 1988–present
- Members: Gunnar Schröder (vocals, guitar); Stefan Ladwig (bass, vocals, since 2005); Jörn "Krel" Schröder (drums); Holger H. (keyboard, guitar, since 2015)
- Past members: Marko "Busch’n" Busch (vocals,† 2005); Holm (Toralf Bornhöft) (bass, until 1991)
- Website: www.dritte-wahl.de

Dritte Wahl (German pronunciation: [ˈdʁɪtə ˈvaːl]), also written 3. Wahl (English translation: "Third Choice") is a German punk rock band from Rostock in Germany. Their music is classified as Deutschpunk and displays clear metal influences. Dritte Wahl’s lyrics are in German and are very direct, politically motivated, and left-leaning. As a German punk band, and particularly as a punk band formed in the former East Germany under the communist state, their songs handle common themes. In the song Macht die Augen auf (English translation: "Open your eyes") they took on the subject of the 1992 anti-immigrant Rostock-Lichtenhagen riots. In their song Mainzer Straße, Dritte Wahl describe the Battle of Mainzer Straße that took place in East Berlin in 1990 when the city decided to clear the squatted houses. In their song Bad K., Dritte Wahl describe the contested circumstances of the death of Wolfgang Grams, a member of the far-left Red Army Faction.

Dritte Wahl have toured extensively in Germany. They toured Europe with the Exploited in 2003, including The Netherlands, Belgium, Austria, Italy, Spain, Switzerland, the Czech Republic, Serbia, Croatia, Slovakia and Hungary. In 2010 Dritte Wahl played concerts in Cuba.

== History ==
The Rostock-based punk band Dritte Wahl formed in 1986, after a 15 year old Gunnar Schröder was gifted with a guitar; he formed the band together with his brother (Jörn "Krel" Schroeder) and a friend from school (Marko "Busch’n" Busch). The band performed for the first time in May 1988 in their school cafeteria in Rostock-Evershagen, where they covered a number of songs from Die Toten Hosen. In the band’s original line-up, Marko "Busch’n" Busch was the front-man and Toralf "Holm" Bornhöft played bass. However Bornhöft left the band in 1991. Dritte Wahl achieved national recognition and success in the German punk scene as a 3-piece band; the line-up was: Busch’n (vocals, bass), Gunnar Schroeder (guitar, vocals), and Jörn "Krel" Schroeder (drums, vocals). Gunnar Schröder cites Judas Priest, AC/DC, Iron Maiden, Accept, Freygang, Ton Steine Scherben, Slime, Hass, and the Toten Hosen as early musical influences for the band.

In 1998 the band formed their own record label named Rausch Records, which was later renamed Dritte Wahl Records. All of the band’s later releases have appeared on this label. That includes 10 official studio albums, as well as three Live albums, three compilation albums, and four live videos on dvd.

On January 17, 2005, Busch’n died from stomach cancer at age 35. The remaining band members did not want to dissolve the band, and Busch’n also had not wanted that. Since April 2005, Stefan Ladwig joined the band on bass.

On January 31, 2015, Dritte Wahl released their ninth studio album Geblitzdingst, which was their first album that made it into the German Charts. Holger H. joined the band as guitarist and keyboard player.

On September 1, Dritte Wahl released their tenth studio album titled 10, which reached place 12 in the German album charts. This album includes the song 25 Cent about how retirees who cannot make ends meet collect used bottles for the recycling value.

On September 18, 2020, Dritte Wahl released the album 3D which reached place 6 on the German album charts.

== Gallery ==
Dritte Wahl, live at With Full Force 2018

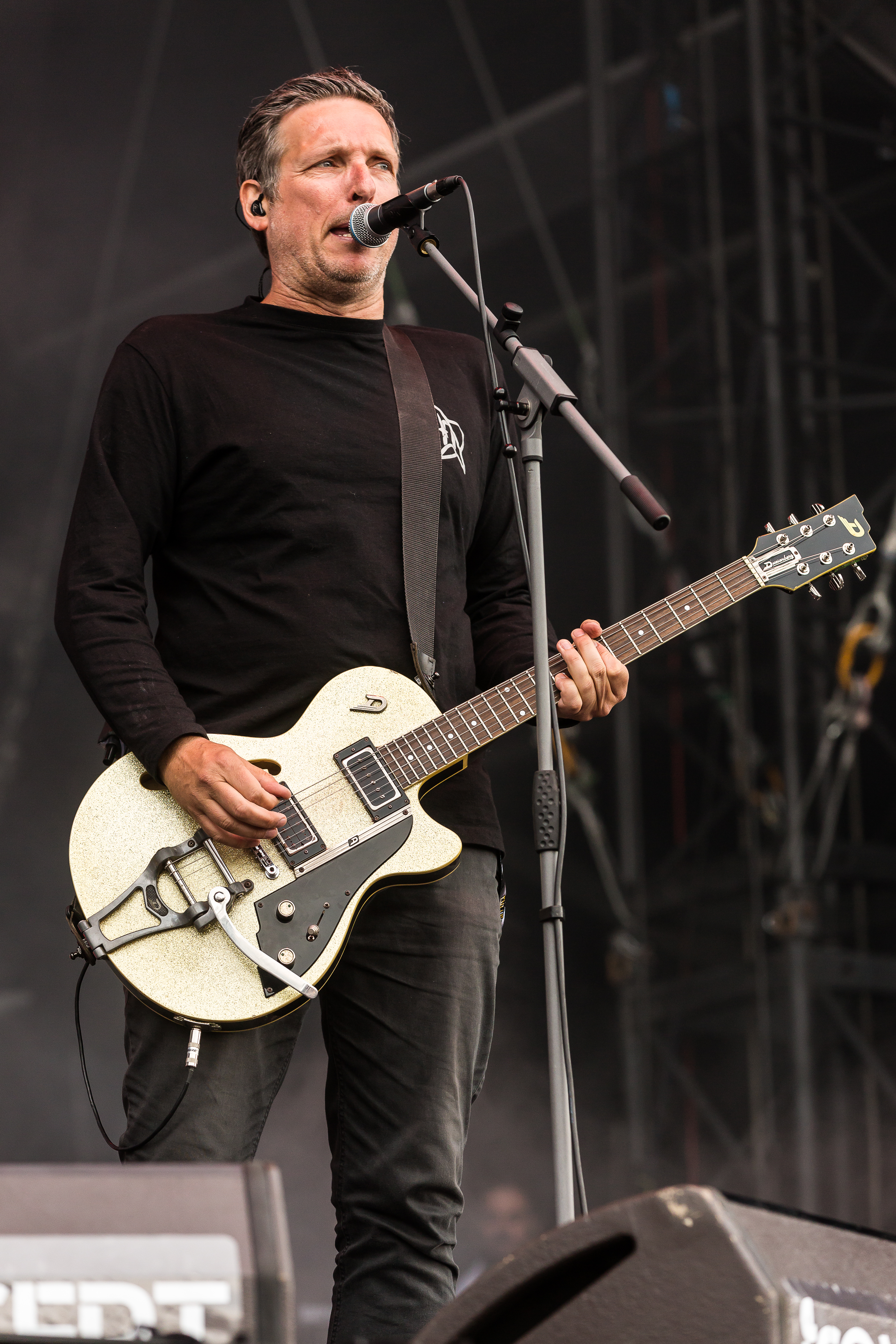
Singer Gunnar Schröder

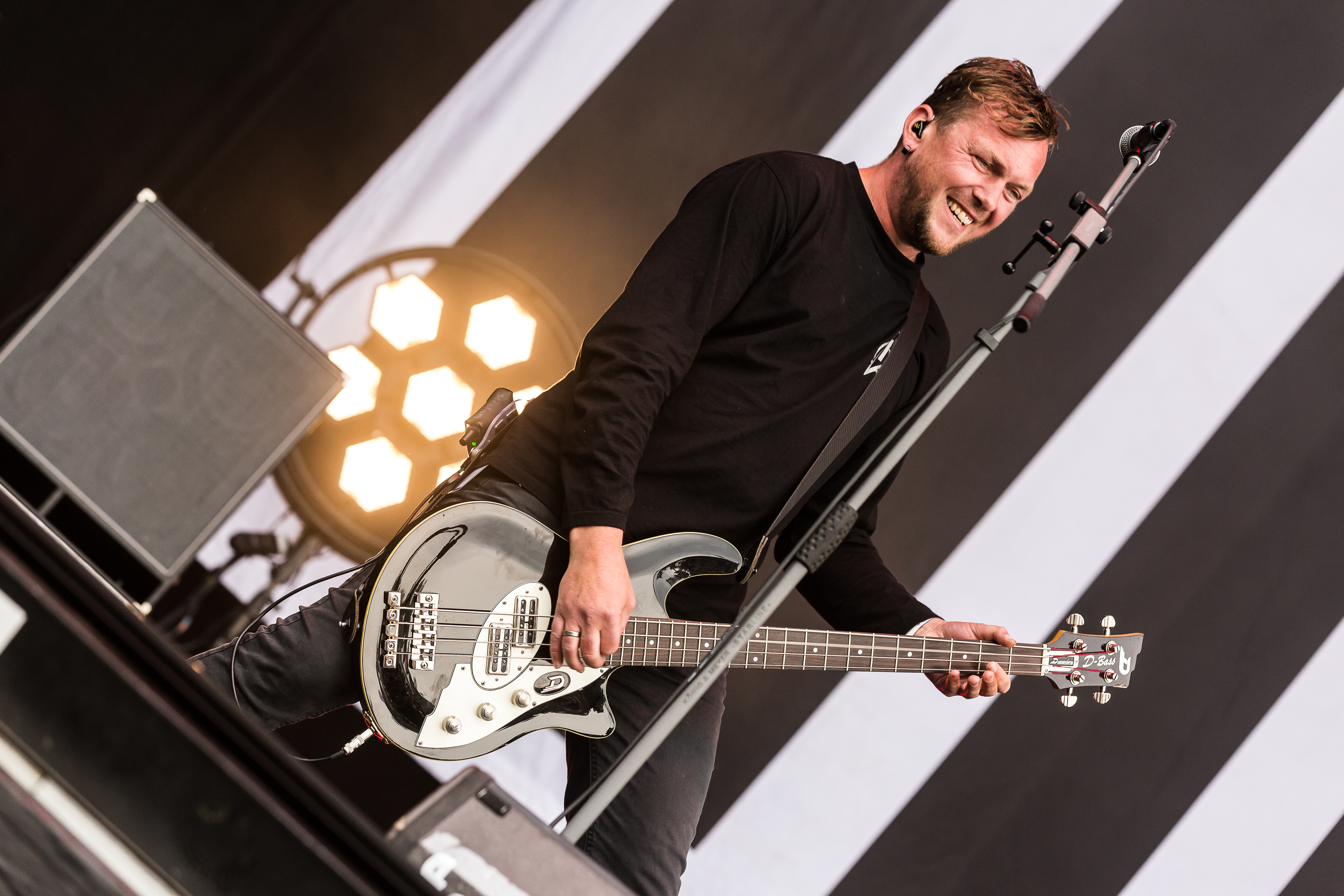
Bassist Stefan Ladwig

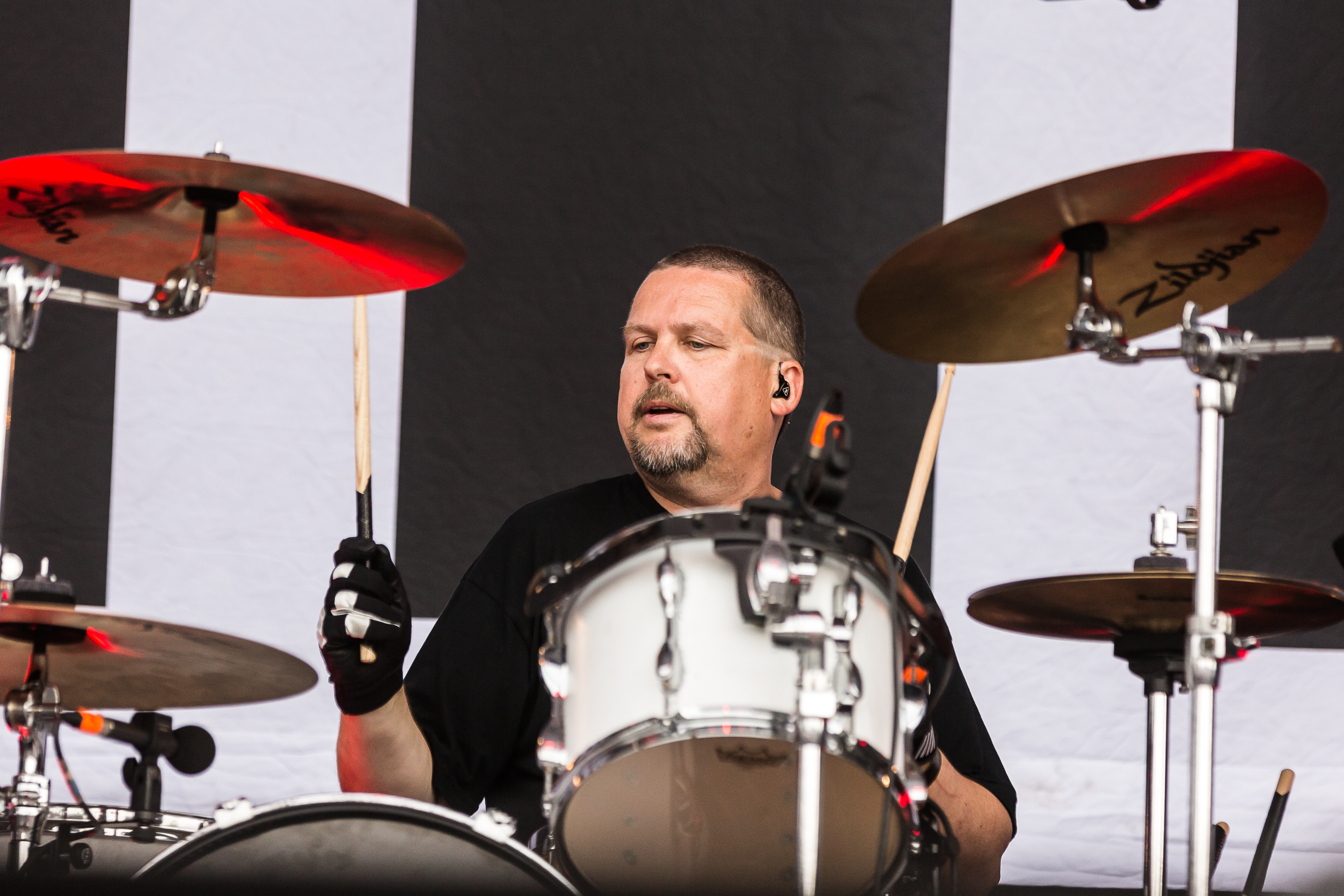
Drummer Jörn "Krell" Schröder

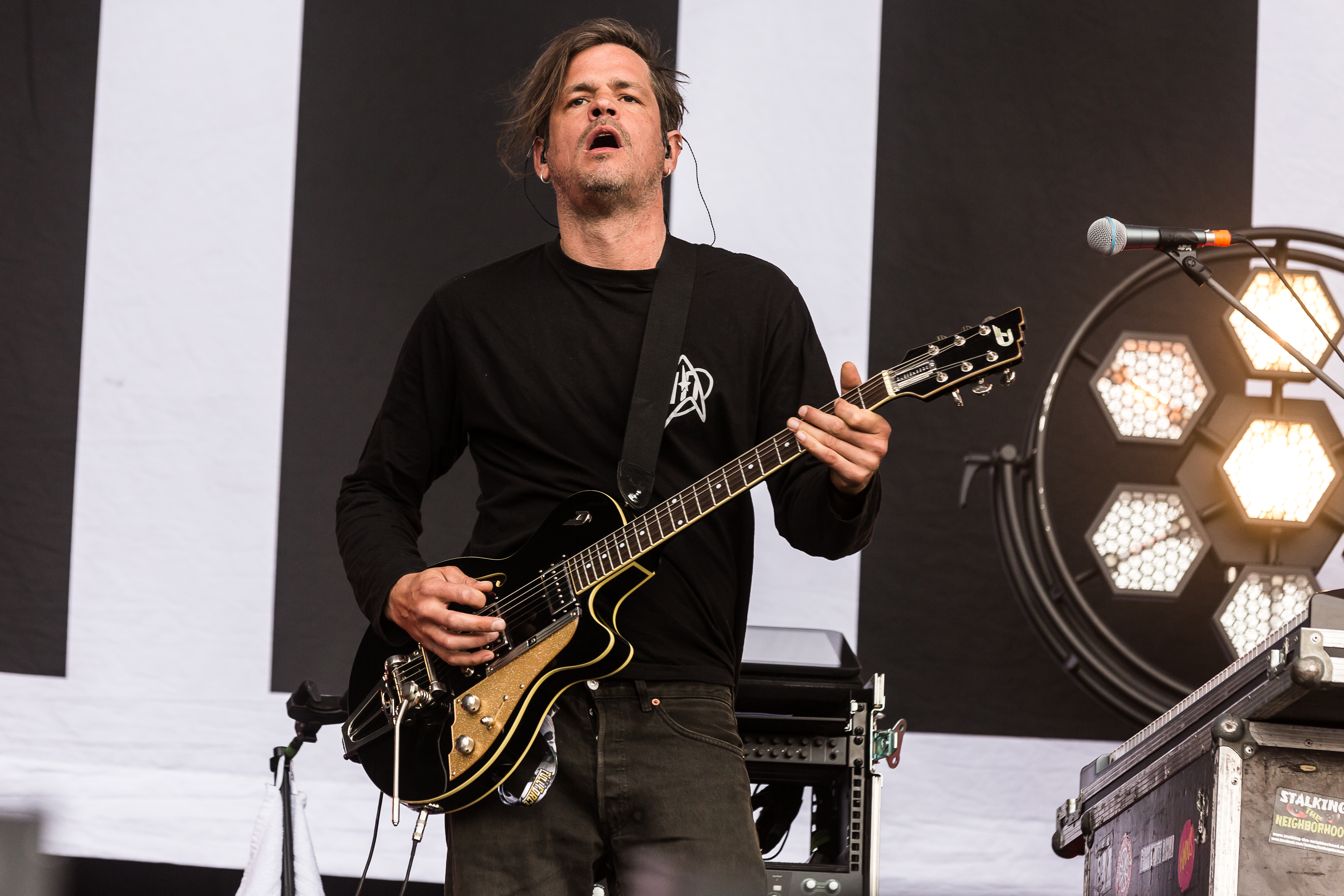
Guitarist and Keyboarder Holger H.

== Discography ==
=== Albums ===
Studio albums

1. 1992: Fasching in Bonn (Amöbenklang)
2. 1994: Auge um Auge (Amöbenklang)
3. 1996: Nimm drei (Amöbenklang)
4. 1998: Strahlen (Dritte Wahl Records)
5. 1999: Delikat (11 Jahre Bühnenjubiläum ’88–’99) (Dritte Wahl Records)
6. 2001: Halt mich fest (Rausch Records)
7. 2005: Fortschritt (Dritte Wahl Records)
8. 2010: Gib Acht! (Dritte Wahl Records)
9. 2015: Geblitzdingst (Dritte Wahl Records)
10. 2017: 10 (Dritte Wahl Records)
11. 2020: 3D (Dritte Wahl Records)
12. 2023: Urlaub in der Bredouille (Dritte Wahl Records)

Live/Best-of albums

- 2002: Roggen Roll (live at Mühlenfest Altkalen)
- 2003: Meer Roggen Roll (live at Mühlenfest Altkalen)
- 2003: Die sonderbare Tape-CD
- 2004: Tooth for tooth
- 2007: Singles
- 2009: 20 Jahre – 20 Songs (live)

Demo-Tapes

- 1991: Raff dich auf (demo tape)
- 1992: Rari Tape (demo tape)

Re-releases

- 2012: Fasching in Bonn – Remastered
- 2012: Auge um Auge – Remastered
- 2012: Nimm drei – Remastered

=== Singles ===
- 1995: Dritte Wahl / Dödelhaie, Split-CD/10″ (with Dödelhaie)
- 1998: Hallo Erde, 7″
- 2000: Heimspiel, CD-EP (under the name Kollektiv Hein Butt)
- 2001: Und jetzt?, MCD/10″
- 2005: Willst du?, promo MCD
- 2014: Dritte Wahl / Farben Lehre, Split 7″ (with Farben Lehre)
- 2017: Dritte Wahl / Zona 84, Split 7″ (with Zona 84)
- 2017: Zum Licht empor, 12″
- 2018: Der große Tag, MCD/10″ (featuring Sondaschule)
- 2020: Was zur Hölle...?!, 7"
- 2020: Brennt alles nieder, 7"
- 2021: Abends halb zehn, 7“

=== Videos ===
Video albums

- 1996: 1996 – Das Video zum aktuellen Album, VHS
- 2002: Roggen Roll (live at Mühlenfest Altkalen), VHS
- 2006: Dreilive, DVD
- 2008: 20 Jahre – Kinder, wie die Zeit vergeht!, DVD

Music videos

- 2010: Ich bin’s (not official)
- 2010: Morgen schon weg (not official)
- 2014: Der Schatten
- 2017: Scotty
- 2017: Der Himmel über uns
- 2017: Zum Licht empor
- 2018: Runde um Runde
- 2018: Der große Tag (featuring Sondaschule)
- 2020: Was zur Hölle...?!
- 2020: Zusammen
- 2020: Zur See
- 2020: Brennt alles nieder
- 2021: Abends halb zehn
- 2022: Das regelt der Markt

Extra

- Wenn man schon ein Schiff hat, documentary film with music from Dritte Wahl
- 2013: 25 Jahre-25 Bands tribute-sampler
