= Razzia (band) =

German punk rock band

- Origin: Hamburg, Germany
- Genres: Post-punk; Punk rock
- Years active: 1979–1992; 1993–2004; 2008–
- Labels: Weird System; Triton; Höhne Records; Impact Records; Major Label
- Members: Andreas Siegler (guitar); Peter Siegler (drums); Frank Endlich (guitar); Rajas Thiele (vocals); Andreas Rotter (drums)
- Past members: Thomas Harm (bass); Sören Callsen (bass); Bernhard Waack (keyboard, guitar); Stefan Arndt (vocals); Arne Brix (drums); Joachim Bernstorff (drums); Marcel Zürcher (drums); Christian Both (bass); Martin Siemßen (guitar); Thomas Gerion (bass); Jan-Friedrich Conrad (keyboard); Andrea Messerschmidt (keyboard); Thorsten Suffax Sievers; Torsten Becker (guitar)
- Website: razzia.info

Razzia is a German punk or post-punk band founded in Hamburg in 1979. Their combination of thought-provoking German lyrics and fast, energetic punk rock has made Razzia one of the most important early German punk bands. In their lyrics, Razzia explore and criticize a range of social and political issues, generally adopting a cynical, pessimistic, and counter-culture point of view.

Razzia has released nine studio albums and five live albums over more than forty years as an active band. Of these, two were released by the German punk label Weird System. Razzia songs were included on the early German punk sampler from Weird System Records Paranoia In Der Strassenbahn, as well as two of the long-running German series of samplers Punk Rock BRD Vol 1., and Punk Rock BRD Vol. 3. A song from Razzia's 2019 album is featured on the sampler Ox Compilation #142 from Ox Fanzine. Razzia's recent series of live compilation albums is released by the record label Colturschock, while their most recent studio album is released on the German indie record label Major Label.

== History ==
=== 1979–1992 ===
The punk band Razzia was founded at the end of 1979 in Hamburg by the brothers Andreas Siegler (guitar) and Peter Siegler (drums) along with Thomas Harm (bass). Initially Andreas was the band's singer, but soon Rajas Thiele (formerly of the band FRUST 81) joined as singer, along with Frank Endlich on guitar. After their first performance in 1980, Harm left the band and was replaced by Thorsten Hatje.

As a band from Hamburg-Langenhorn, members of Razzia were friendly with members of the political punk band Slime. This association helped them to gigs at early punk festivals in Hannover and Bremen and introduced them to the label Aggressive Rockproduktionen.

In 1981 Razzia contributed two songs (Arsch Im Sarge and B Alarm) to a compilation Underground Hits I produced by the label Aggressive Rockproduktionen, which is known for releasing albums from Slime, Toxoplasma, and Canal Terror as well as licensing and distributing well-known American punk bands Black Flag and Hüsker Dü. This compilation featured Black Flag and the Angry Samoans, and gained Razzia international recognition. After Thorsten Hatje left the band in 1982, Sören Callsen took over as bass player. In 1983, Razzia worked with the Hamburger Label Weird System to bring out their first LP Tag ohne Schatten. After this release the band toured in Sweden, Norway, Denmark, Spain, Austria, and Switzerland.

In 1985, at a concert in the Ballhaus Tiergarten Razzia recorded the LP Los Islas Limonados. This fulfilled the contract Razzia had made with Weird System to make two records.

In 1986, Razzia released the LP Ausflug mit Franziska, on the label Triton; this record represented a new musical and lyrical direction for Razzia. That direction included the use of a keyboard, which was unusual for punk bands at the time, and was key to the morbid and experimental atmosphere of the music. On keyboard Andrea Messerschmidt, Bernhard Waack, and Jan-Friedrich Conrad joined the band. Waack later played guitar. For a short time Peter Siegler played with the band Destination Zero and during this period was replaced by the drummer Marcel Zürcher.

In 1989 Razzia produced the album Menschen zu Wasser. This album represented a further difference from mainstrain punk rock in Germany. After this album came out, Frank Endlich left the band for a short time.

In 1991 Razzia's next album Spuren was released. During production, Sören Callsen left the band, although he still collaborated in writing lyrics and the bass parts. His replacement on the bass was Christian Both. Bernhard Waack was also replaced on the guitar by Martin Siemßen.

In 1992 Razzia released a live album, simple titled Live, which was recorded at a concert in the Hamburger Fabrik, which was intended to be their final concert. At this point the band broke up.

=== 1993–2004 ===
In 1993 Christian Both, Peter Siegler, Martin Siemßen, and Andreas Siegler reformed the band with a different line-up. Rajas Thiele was replaced by Stefan Arndt as lead singer, and the band toured across Germany. Peter Siegler has said that they should have renamed the band at this point.

In 1995, Razzia released the album Labyrinth on Impact Records. Arne Brix took over as drummer from Peter Siegler. The tour the following year was largely unsuccessful and Christian Both left the band. Then Thomas Gerion joined the band on bass.

In 1999, Razzia released the album Augenzeugenberichte. In yet another change in the line-up, Peter Siegler rejoined the band and took over Martin Siemßen's place on guitar.

In 2004, Razzia released the album Relativ sicher am Strand. At this point Andreas Siegler had broken several fingers in an accident and could no longer play. A short time later Peter Siegler left the band again. After the end of the tour, Razzia released a live cd and the band broke up again.

=== 2008 - today ===
Motivated in part by the album Ausflug mit Razzia by Olli Schulz und der Hund Marie released in 2008, and in part by the 30-year anniversary of the band's founding, Rajas Thiele, Frank Endlich, Sören Callsen, Bernhard Waack, Peter and Andreas Siegler began working together on new songs. They performed as Razzia in the Ruhrgebiet, Niedersachsen, Hamburg, and Berlin. Because of health reasons, Peter Siegler was eventually replaced by Arne Brix on drums.

In 2011, Razzia began working with the label Colturschock to bring out re-pressings of all of their earlier albums, except for Tag ohne Schatten, which they did not retain the rights to. In addition they worked to release their unreleased songs, including live songs from many existing tape recordings. This resulted in two Rest of- albums; a third such album was planned, to make up a trilogy.

The band went through a further change of line-up in 2013. Joachim Bernstorff took over on drums for Arne Brix, and Peter Siegler took over on bass for Sören Callsen. In 2016, Bernhard Waack left the band. After that several years, and the band continued to perform. In 2019, the band released the album Am Rande von Berlin on the well-known German record label Major Label. They also produced and released four music videos for the songs Am Rande von Berlin, Nicht in meinem Namen, Straße der Krähen and Wer die Märchenstunde stört.

In November 2018, Andreas Siegler stopped doing live performances because of health reasons. In January 2019, Torsten Becker replaced him in the line-up for live shows. In March 2019, Razzia began a tour across Germany to promote the release of the album Am Rande von Berlin. This album was produced on the 40th anniversary of the band's founding. On December 13, 2019 Torsten Becker died suddenly, resulting in the cancellation of their live show in Chemnitz. In fall 2023, Razzia toured within Germany.

== Discography ==
=== Studio albums ===
1. Übungsraum Tape (self-released 1982)
2. Tag ohne Schatten LP/CD (Weird System Records, 1983)
3. Ausflug mit Franziska LP/CD (Triton, 1986)
4. Demo-Tape R.I.A. ("Recorded in Action“) (Tritonus, 1986)
5. Menschen zu Wasser LP/CD (Triton, 1989)
6. Spuren LP/CD (Triton, 1991)
7. Labyrinth LP/CD (Impact Records, 1995)
8. Augenzeugenberichte LP/CD (Triton, 1999)
9. Relativ sicher am Strand CD/LP (Höhne Records, 2004)
10. Am Rande von Berlin DoLP/CD (Major Label, 2019)

=== Live albums ===
1. Los Islas Limonados 12" (Weird System Records, 1985)
2. Live LP/CD (Triton, 1993)
3. Live (split mit Der Dicke Polizist) (Impact Records, 2004)
4. Rest of Vol. 1 (Colturschock, 2013)
5. Rest of Vol. 2 (Colturschock, 2016)

=== Selected contributions to Compilations/Samplers ===
- Underground Hits 1 (1981, Aggressive Rockproduktionen)
- Waterkant Hits (1983)
- Keine Experimente (1983)
- Hardcore Power Music PtII (1984)
- Life Is a Joke (1984)
- U-Boats Attack America (1986)
- Danach und Stunden später (1987)
- Paranoia in der Straßenbahn – Punk in Hamburg 1977–83 – "Uns nicht“ (1990, Weird System Records)
- Slam Brigade Haifischbar – "An der Grenze“ (1991)
- Nazis raus! – "Fahnensog“ (1991)
- Schlachtrufe BRD 2 – "Fahnensog“ (1992, Snake Records)
- 15 Kiddie Favorites – (1994)
- Alptraummelodie – "Labyrinth“, "Motorengel“ (1994)
- ...Ist es wirklich schon so spät? – "2013 – zurück in die Vergangenheit“ (1994)
- So What?! A Tribute to Anti-Nowhere League – "Out in the Wasteland“ (1996)
- Haste mal ´ne Mark – "Kreuz oder Kopf“ (1996)
- Back to Punk Vol.2 – "Abschaum erwache“ (1997)
- Soundtracks zum Untergang 4 – "Ich lebe diesen Tag“ (1997, Impact Records)
- Haste mal ´ne Mark – Die Zweite – "Unterwegs in Sachen Selbstmord“ (1997)
- Impact Classix Vol. III – "An der See“ (2000)
- Punk Rock BRD 1 – "Schatten über Gerolzhofen“ (2003, Weird System Records)
- Partisanen 5 – "Terrorvision“ (2003)
- Schlachtrufe BRD 7 – "Mc War“ (2004, Nix Gut Records)
- Die deutsche Punkinvasion IV – "Kreaturen“ (2004)
- Nikolaus raus Vol. 1 – "Haus in der Sonne“ (2005)
- Punk Rock BRD 3 – "B-Alarm“ (2006, Weird System Records)
- Ox Compilation #142 (2019, Ox Fanzine)

=== Tribute albums ===
- Ausflug mit Razzia by Olli Schulz und der Hund Marie (2008)
