= Östro 430 =

German punk band

- Origin: Düsseldorf and Hamburg, Germany
- Genres: German punk, Neue Deutsche Welle
- Years active: 1979–1984, 2019-present
- Members: Martina Weith (vocals, saxophone); Stepha Schweiger (keyboard/electric piano); Anja Peterssen (bass); Kantina Kasino (drums)
- Past members: Monika Kellermann (bass, until 1980); Marita Welling (drums until 1981); Olivia Casali (bass 1980-1981); Gisela Hottenroth (bass, 1981–1984); Birgit Köster (drums,1981–1984); Ralf Küpping (guitar, 1983–1984); Sandy Black (drums ,2019-2023); Bettina Flörchinger(keyboard ,1979-2024)
- Website: https://www.oestro430.de

Östro 430 is a four-piece punk band from Düsseldorf, Germany; they were the first all-female punk band in Germany. Although they see themselves as a punk band, they have also been classified as a key Neue Deutsche Welle band, and have been described as riot grrrl. The band reformed in 2019, and now hails from Hamburg.

In total, Östro 430 has released 4 albums. During their first period of activity in the 1980s, Östro 430 released two records on the indie record label Schallmauer-Records, which also released albums from der KFC and Xao Seffcheque. In 2020, the band released a best-of compilation on the Hamburg indie label Tapete Records, which also is the record label for Fehlfarben and Superpunk. Östro 430's upcoming release in 2023 is also on Tapete Records. The singer Thees Uhlmann has covered Östro 430's song "Ich halt mich raus" and released it as a bonus track to his album Junkies und Scientologen in September 2019. Östro 430 has also been featured in the largest teen magazine in Germany, Bravo.

== Musical style ==
The band uses an unusual choice of instruments, including the electric piano, the saxophone, and no guitar. Weith has described this choice as a solution made out of need; they could not find a female guitarist, and so took the keyboard as their main instrument. Their music is known for its clear and angry lyrics, which are characteristic of punk rock. The main themes in their lyrics are sex, feminism, anti-fascism, and conventional social mores.

== History ==
The band was founded in December 1979 by Martina Weith, Bettina Flörchinger, Marita Welling and Monika Kellermann. Welling and Flörchinger met at a women's student group at the university in Düsseldorf. Welling also met Weith and Kellermann at the Ratinger Hof, a pub associated with the punk scene in Düsseldorf. Weith has written that the 1978 David Bowie concert was an inspiration. The band's name references the hormone estrogen and the traffic code for the city center of Düsseldorf. The band's practice room was a bunker under the Kirchplatz in Düsseldorf, where they shared space and equipment with other punk bands.

On May 3, 1980, the band had their first performance in the Okie Dokie, a club in the city of Neuss at a festival organized by the punk fanzine Schemer. Östro 430 met the band Fehlfarben at this festival, and were invited to open for their tour of Germany. Only three weeks after their first performance, Kellermann left the band and was replaced by Olivia Casali on bass.

In 1980, Östro 430 released three songs ("Sexueller Notstand", "Triebtäter", and "Too Cool") on a sampler from the label Schallmauer. In 1981 they released their first EP Durch dick & dünn which included 8 songs ("Das Quietschende Bett", "Sechzehn", "Sexueller Notstand", "Plastikwelt", "S-Bahn", "Ich halt mich raus", "Idi Otto", and "Zu cool"). A few months after this EP was released, Welling left the band, followed by Casali. The line-up was filled out by new members Gisela Hottenroth on bass and Birgit Köster on drums. The band covered the X-Ray Spex song "Identity", with lyrics translated into German.

In 1983, Östro 430 released the studio album Weiber wie wir. At the end of 1983, Ralf Küpping jointed the band on guitar. However, the band did not release any further albums after their independent record label Schallmauer-Records collapsed. On May 25, 1984, the band gave a final farewell concert in the Freizeitstätte Garath in Düsseldorf and then broke up.

In the beginning of the 1990s, Weith sang on records from the bands Family 5, and Prollhead, as well as with the Ärzte. Weith also worked as a music journalist. Flörchinger became a gynecologist. In 1982, Casali joined Fehlfarben, contributing backing vocals and took over on bass for some pieces, along with Hans Maahn. After Fehlfarben's three-month tour through Germany, Austria, and the Netherlands, Casali left that band. On May 28, 1999, Östro 430 performed a reunion concert in Tor 3 in Düsseldorf.

In 2019, Östro 430 reunited under the founding members Weith and Flörchinger, as well as new members Anja Peterssen (bass) and Sandy Black (drums). In May 2020, Tapete Records released a best-of compilation of Östro 430's early work, titled Keine Krise kann mich schocken. In August 2021 the band gave their first concert with the new line up in Hamburg. The band has announced the release of a new studio album Punkrock nach Hausfrauenart in September 2023. In January 2024 Kantina Kasino took over from Sandy Black on drums. In december 2024 Bettina Flörchinger left the band. Since 2025 Stepha Schweiger plays the keyboard.

== Discography ==
1. 1981: Durch dick & dünn (12" EP, Schallmauer-Records)
2. 1982: Vampir / Meerschweinchen (Single, Schallmauer-Records)
3. 1983: Weiber wie wir (LP, Schallmauer-Records)
4. 2020: Keine Krise kann mich schocken (Tapete Records)
5. 2023: Punkrock nach Hausfrauenart (Tapete Records)

== Literature ==
- Sven-André Dreyer, Michael Wenzel, Thomas Stelzmann: Keine Atempause – Musik aus Düsseldorf. Droste, Düsseldorf 2018, 192 S., ISBN 978-3-7700-2067-6
