= Yvonne Ducksworth =

Canadian singer and actress

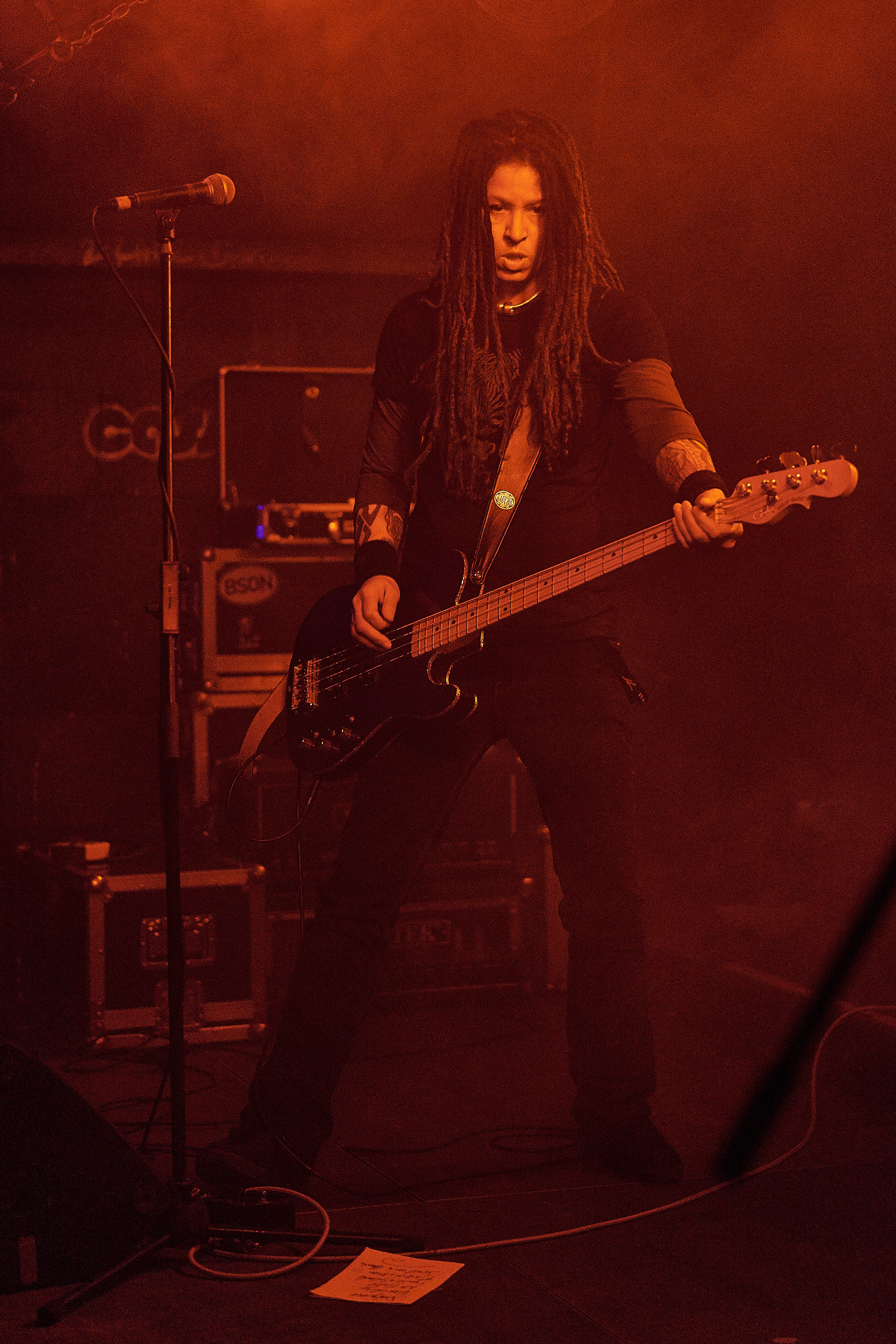
Ducksworth live with Treedeon in Berlin, 2016

Yvonne Ducksworth (born in 1967 in Burlington, Ontario) is a Canadian singer, actress (known for Trouble) and TV presenter. She lives in Berlin.

As a teenager, she moved with her parents to Frankfurt am Main and finally went to live on her own in Berlin-Kreuzberg in 1983. In 1986 she was a singer in the Berlin Hardcore bands Combat Not Conform and Manson Youth. In 1987, she formed the rock-punk-metal band Jingo de Lunch with guitarists Sepp Ehrensberger and Tom Schwoll, the bassist Henning Menke and the drummer Steve Hahn. This band (with Ducksworth on vocals) released five albums and many EPs and compilations before breaking up in 1996.

She acted in many films directed by the Canadian director Penelope Buitenhuis, including short films such as They Shoot Pigs Don't They? (1989) and LLaw (1990). She had the main role in Buitenhuis' first TV movie Trouble (1993) where she played a musician named Jonnie who is very active in the Kreuzberg's political squat scene and fights with her band Jello Belly for the preservation of the alternative rock center "Rockhaus". The film was broadcast on TV on 23 March 1993 and was released on DVD a few years later.

In 1994 she presented the TV show Metalla with Adam Turle on the TV channel VIVA. The series showed clips and reports on metal, hardcore and punk music. Jingo de Lunch broke up in 1996. Ducksworth moved to Phoenix, Arizona, where she studied telecommunications technology from 2004 until 2007 at the South Mountain Community College.

In August 2006, Jingo de Lunch played two sold out reunion shows at the White Trash Fast Food in Berlin. Then, the band reunited, recorded two albums and toured in Germany and the rest of Europe until 2012, before breaking up again. Now she plays bass in the Berlin sludge trio Treedeon.

Since 2007, Ducksworth has been living in Berlin. She is vegan and is involved in the animal rights movement. She once worked as a bartender at the Franken Bar in the Oranienstraße in Kreuzberg and was a member (under the nickname "Ente Agony") of the Berlin roller derby team "Berlin Bombshells".
