= Hass (band) =

German punk band

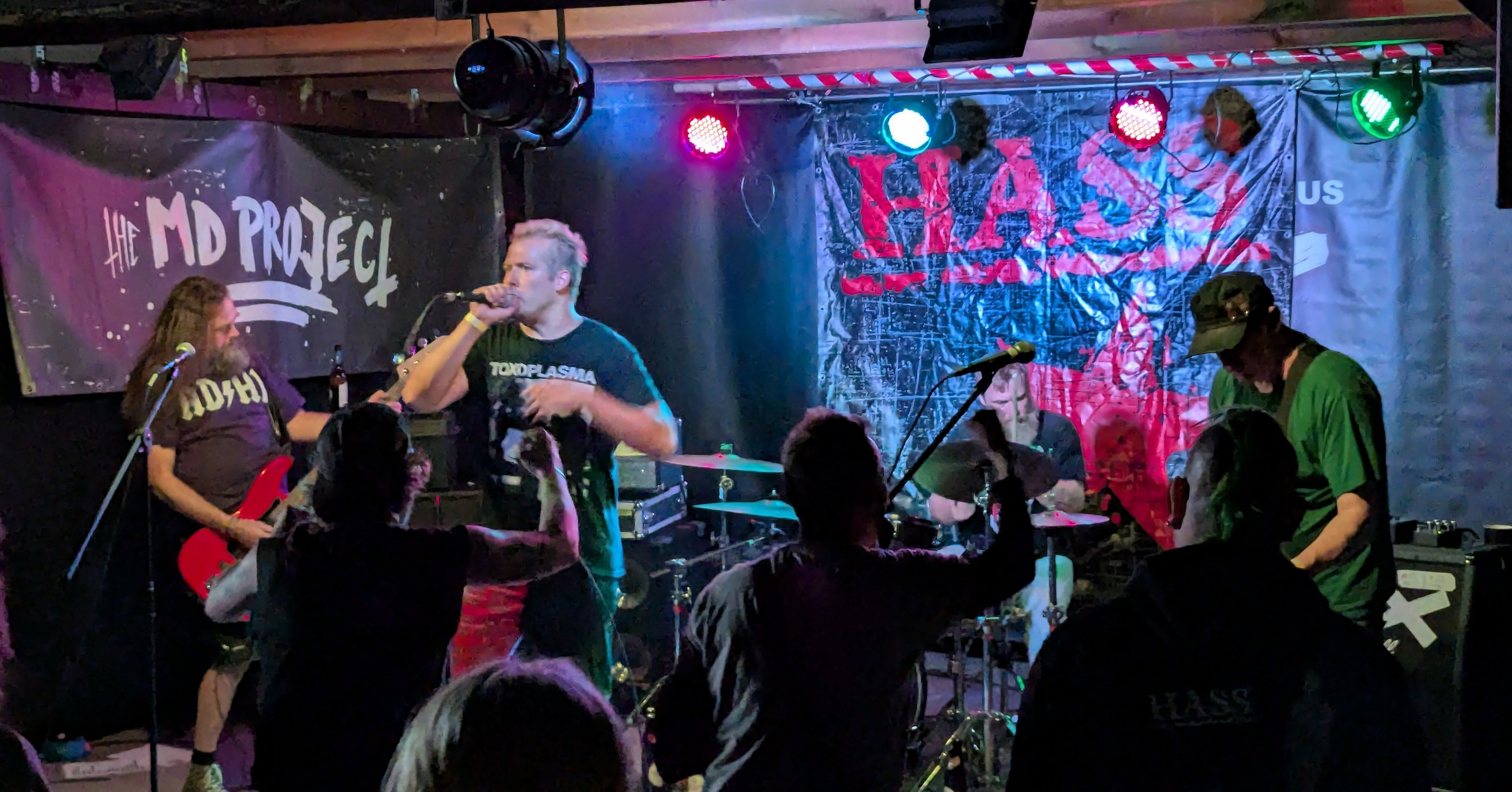
- Hass live in Magdeburg September 2025

Background information
- Origin: Marl and Recklinghausen, North Rhine-Westphalia, Germany
- Genres: Deutschpunk, political punk
- Years active: 1978–2001, 2013-present
- Labels: Hass Produktion, Twisted Chords, Aggressive Punk Produktionen
- Members: Peter "Hecktor" Blümer (guitar); Karsten Siebert (bass, prev. drums); Burn Harper (drums); Marv Mandela (vocals)
- Past members: Gisbert Neumayer (guitar); Thomas "Tommi" Sohns (drums, vocals); Georg Pötter (guitar); Alex Schwers (drums); Chris Römer (bass); Bertie Klompenhouver (drums); Jan Ostblock (bass); Steffi Syndikati (vocals)
- Website: aggressivepunkproduktionen.de/artists/show/Hass

Hass is a German punk band founded in 1978 in the German state of North Rhine-Westphalia. Members are from the cities of Marl and Recklinghausen. Their music is categorized as Deutschpunk, and the lyrics are generally politically motivated. Hass is known for their anti-fascist position, exemplified in the song Lasst die Glatzen platzen (English translation: "Let the skin-heads break open"). They have released ten full-length albums, three EPs, and four singles.

== History ==
As a band founded in 1978, Hass is one of the first Deutschpunk bands. Their debut album Hass allein genügt nicht mehr was released in 1981 by H’Art Musik. The original band line-up was: Steffi Syndikati (vocals), Peter "Hecktor" Blümer (guitar), Jan Ostblock (bass), and Bertie Klompenhouver "B.A.P." (drums). Later Christian Römer joined the band as a second guitarist. This release was supported by a tour and a second pressing of the LP appeared on the music label Ariola.

Since 1988 the band practices in a practice room in the city of Marl, in the district Sinsen-Lenkerbeck. The band founded its own record label "Hass Produktion," which has released many cds under the label code 7120.

After the release of their album Endstation in 2000, the band broke up. Between 2003 and 2007, guitarist Peter "Hecktor" Blümer was part of the band Rasta Knast. Drummer Alex Schwers] played in several bands, including Slime, Rasta Knast, Eisenpimmel, Jeff Dahl Group, Die Mimmi’s, Knochenfabrik, and Chefdenker. In addition to this he organized the annual punk music festivals Ruhrpott Rodeo and Punk im Pott.

Hass reformed in the fall of 2007 around a reunion tour. In 2014 they released the new album Kacktus on the label Aggressive Punk Produktionen. The recordings for this album were done by Peter Blümer (guitar), Alex Schwers (guitar), Chris Roemer (bass), Karsten Siebert (drums), and Thomas Sohns (vocals). Claudius Reimann played the accordion as a guest musician on the album. This album includes a cover of Rio Reiser's song Alles Lüge. In June 2014, the band toured to support the album, and played shows in Hamburg, Berlin, and Karlsruhe, among other cities.

In 2020 Hass had to cancel several concerts for health reasons for Thomas Sohns, and he later left the band. He was replaced by singer Marv Mandela. Hass's album Macht kaputt, was längst kaputt ist (English translation: "Break what has long been broken"), released in 2020, still included Thomas Sohns on vocals. Marv Mandela sang on only one song, Zum Scheißen zu doof (English translation: "Too stupid to shoot"), which also includes an introduction from Oliver Kalkofe. In 2022, Hass released a self-titled EP on Aggressive Punk Produktionen. On this EP is the song Das hunderttausendste Anti-Nazi-Lied (English translation: "The hundred-thousandth anti-Nazi-song").

== Discography ==
The majority of the band’s releases appear on the band’s own label Hass Produktion. Their last three releases appear on the German label Aggressive Punk Produktionen.

=== Studio albums ===
1. Hass allein genügt nicht mehr (H'art Musik/Ariola, 1981)
2. Zurück in die Zukunft (Hass Produktion, June 1989)
3. Gebt der Meute was sie braucht (Hass Produktion, August 1990)
4. Allesfresser (Hass Produktion, April 1992)
5. Liebe ist tot (Hass Produktion, May 1994)
6. Anarchistenschwein (Hass Produktion, May 1996)
7. Die ersten Tage 78–80 (Hass Produktion, June 1997)
8. Endstation (Hass Produktion, February 2000)
9. Gebt der Meute was sie braucht (Twisted Chords, August 2012)
10. Kacktus (Aggressive Punk Produktionen, April 2014)
11. Macht kaputt, was längst kaputt ist (Aggressive Punk Produktionen, October 2020)

=== Singles and EPs ===
- Debüt EP mit 4 Tracks (1980)
- "4-Track EP" (October 1988)
- Keine Chance/Menschenfresser EP (February 1990)
- Sag Du Liebst Mich (1990)
- Leise rieselt der Schnee EP (May 1995)
- Für die besten Fans der Liga MCD (January 1996)
- Hass (self-titled EP) (Aggressive Punk Produktionen, 2022)

=== Samplers (incomplete list) ===
- Soundtracks zum Untergang 1 (Aggressive Rockproduktionen, 1979/80)
- Deutsche Punk Klassiker (Snake Records, 1990)
- Punk Rock BRD - Die amtliche History von Punk in Deutschland (Weird System, 2000)
