= Vorkriegsjugend =

German punk band

- Origin: West Berlin, Germany
- Genres: Punk rock Hardcore
- Years active: 1982–1985, 1998–1999
- Members: Jürgen Heiland, Sepp "Fuchs“ Ehrensberger, Michael Weindl
- Past members: Markus "Bomber“ Noack, Thomas "Heschel“ Rickert, Klaus Hicker

Vorkriegsjugend (German pronunciation: [ˈfoːɐ̯kʁiːksjuːɡənt], English translation "pre-war youth"), abbreviated VKJ, was an influential Deutschpunk/hardcore punk band from the squatter scene in Berlin-Kreuzberg, West Berlin, Germany. Vorkriegsjugend existed as a band for only three years (1982–85), but is considered to be one of the most notable and influential German punk bands of the period.

In 1983 Vorkriegsjugend released a double 7" record and an LP Heute Spaß, morgen Tod on Weird System Records. Only 900 records were pressed. In 1982/83 the band line-up was: Klaus Hicker (singer), Michael Weindl (guitar), Jürgen Heiland (drums) und Markus Noack (bass).

In 1983 band members Heiland, Bomber, and Fuchs formed the new band Zerstörte Jugend. This band was active through 1985, and their music evolved from hardcore punk to techno. In 1984/85 the line-up for Vorkriegsjugend was: Klaus Hicker (singer), Michael Weindl (guitar), Jürgen Heiland (drums), Thomas Rickert (bass) und Sepp Ehrensberger (second guitar). Several video interviews exist from this period. In 1985 the band broke up. In 1998 drummer Jürgen Heiland reformed VKJ as the only band member from the original line-up. VKJ then self-released an EP called Widerstand dem Teutonenland. This band split up for good in 1999.

The self-title LP is considered a rarity. The front cover painting was done by Lisa Deanne Smith (pseudonym Lisa Bat). The 7" EP is even more rare than the LP. There was an official re-release as a 12" by the Brazilian label New Face Records in 1988. The original 7" had no second pressing and can be sold for more than 150 dollars, which makes it one of the most expensive German punk records in history.

In 2003 the band released Wir sind die Ratten (Kreuzberg Hardcore Punk 1982-1985) on Weird System Records. This cd is a remastered version of both the Heute Spaß, morgen Tod EP and the self-titled LP.

== Discography ==
- 1983 – Heute Spaß, morgen Tod (EP, first pressing as a double EP)
- 1984 – Vorkriegsjugend (LP)
- 1998 – Widerstand dem Teutonenland (EP)
- 2003 – Wir sind die Ratten (Kreuzberg Hardcore Punk 1982-1985) (compilation of the LP and the double EP)
