= Common Thread (Spermbirds album) =

Studio album by Spermbirds
- Released: 1990
- Recorded: Jan – Feb, 1990; Vielklang Studios, Berlin, Germany
- Genre: Hardcore punk
- Length: 29:54
- Label: X-Mist Records / Boss Tuneage
- Producer: Georg Kalere

Spermbirds chronology
Nothing Is Easy (1987)	Common Thread (1990)	Thanks (1990)

Professional ratings
Review scores
Source	Rating
In Your Face	4/5 stars

Common Thread is the third studio album by Spermbirds – a hardcore punk band from Germany. It was released on X-Mist Records in 1990 and follows 1987's Nothing Is Easy. Also, in the same year, came a live album entitled Thanks, which was released on We Bite Records.

Due to vocalist Lee Hollis' American descent, all lyrics were written by him and sung in English – which also helped them break into a wider European and American audience.

The album was rereleased on Boss Tuneage in 2006 with 3 bonus tracks as a digipack CD and a Picture Disc LP.

== Track listing ==
1. "Melt the Ice" (Matthias Götte, Lee Hollis) – 3:15
2. "Open Letter" (Frank Rahm, Hollis) – 1:59
3. "Two Feet" (Rahm, Hollis) – 2:28
4. "Stronger" (Roger Ingenthron, Hollis) – 2:19
5. "Only a Phase" (Götte, Hollis) – 4:03
6. "One Chance" (Rahm, Hollis) – 2:12
7. "With a Gun" (Rahm, Hollis) – 2:51
8. "Common Thread" (Ingenthron, Hollis) – 2:20
9. "Truth of Today" (Götte, Hollis) – 3:55
10. "Victim of Yourself" (Rahm, Hollis) – 4:33

== Credits ==
- Lee Hobson Hollis – vocals
- Frank Rahm – guitar
- Roger Ingenthron – guitar
- Markus Weilemann – bass
- Matthias "Beppo" Götte – drums
- Yvonne Ducksworth – backing vocals on "Stronger"
- Recorded in January – February, 1990 at Vielklang Studios, Berlin, Germany by Georg Kalere
- Mixed by Spermbirds and Georg Kalere
