= Common Threads =

Common Threads may refer to:

- A long-time radio show broadcast on station WKMK (WHTG-FM)
- An organization, supported by Gail Simmons, that teaches low-income children to cook wholesome, affordable meals
- Common Threads: Stories from the Quilt, a documentary film about the NAMES Project AIDS Memorial Quilt
- Common Threads (album)
