= Gimbweiler =

- Municipality
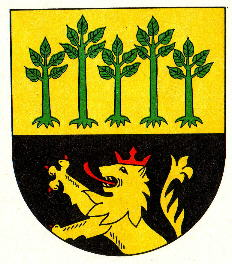
- Coat of arms

- Location of Gimbweiler within Birkenfeld district
- Interactive map of Gimbweiler
- Location within Germany Location within Rhineland-Palatinate
- Coordinates: 49°35′08″N 7°11′23″E
- Country: Germany
- State: Rhineland-Palatinate
- District: Birkenfeld
- Municipal assoc.: Birkenfeld

Government
  - Mayor (2019–24): Martin Samson

Area
  - Total: 5.53 km^{2} (2.14 sq mi)
- Elevation: 480 m (1,570 ft)

Population (2025-12-31)
  - Total: 398
  - Density: 72.0/km^{2} (186/sq mi)
- Time zone: UTC+01:00 (CET)
  - Summer (DST): UTC+02:00 (CEST)
- Postal codes: 55767
- Dialling codes: 06782
- Vehicle registration: BIR
- Website: www.gimbweiler.de

Gimbweiler (German pronunciation: [ˈɡɪmpvaɪlɐ]) is an Ortsgemeinde – a municipality belonging to a Verbandsgemeinde, a kind of collective municipality – in the Birkenfeld district in Rhineland-Palatinate, Germany. It belongs to the Verbandsgemeinde of Birkenfeld, whose seat is in the like-named town.

== Geography ==
=== Location ===
The municipality lies on the Mörschbach in the Schwarzwälder Hochwald (forest) in the Hunsrück, on the boundary with the Saarland.

=== Constituent communities ===
Also belonging to Gimbweiler is the outlying homestead of Heidehof.

== History ==
The oldest forms of Gimbweiler's name are Gumbweiler (1397), Gompwiler (1480) and Gympwiler (1480). Gimbweiler may be of Roman origin, as the now vanished hamlet of Frudesweiler may have been, too, but this cannot be proved.

Gimbweiler's history unfolded much like neighbouring Wolfersweiler's (nowadays an outlying centre of Nohfelden). Gimbweiler always belonged to that village's high court and parish, while the lords through the Middle Ages were the Bishops of Verdun, the Counts of Veldenz, then (1444) the Counts Palatine of Zweibrücken and their line.

In the 13th century, the Lords of Oberstein tried to gain a foothold in the villages that lay between Wolfersweiler and Baumholder. They renewed these attempts in the centuries that followed, bolstered by their enfeoffments from the Duchy of Lorraine.

The Obersteins had had holdings in Gimbweiler from days of yore. The Veldenzes and the Zweibrückens, though, held some lordly rights and ownership, too, jealously guarding and forcefully expanding them. In 1397, for instance, Count Friedrich von Veldenz bought from the Lords of Broich, besides landholdings, interests and rights at Eckelnhusen (Eckelhausen, nowadays an outlying centre of Nohfelden), Hanwilre (Hahnweiler), and Moysberg, an estate and some paupers at Gumpwiler.

After 1432, Gimbweiler and Frudesweiler, along with the neighbouring villages of Freisen, Hoppstädten, Hahnweiler and Reitscheid (nowadays an outlying centre of Freisen), belonged to the Obersteins’ great Lotharingian fief; the enfeoffment document laying out this arrangement was first put into force in this year, and was continually renewed until 1667. The Lotharingians, as well as their fiefholders, the Obersteins, always held on to their claims to Gimbweiler, even after the Oberstein-Falkensteins further enfeoffed the Lord of Schillards of Feigniss with the village in 1599. In reality, however, Palatinate-Zweibrücken hegemony over Gimbweiler was not questioned.

In Napoleonic times, Gimbweiler and neighbouring Wolfersweiler belonged to the Mairie (“Mayoralty”) of Nohfelden, which in turn belonged to the canton of Baumholder.

In 1640, it seems that Frudesweiler was still in existence, but by 1740, the historical record reports that it was in decay. The people of Gimbweiler and Weiersbach exercised grazing rights here, the legal disputes over which continued into the 19th century. The question was settled with a compromise: Weiersbach got two fifths of Frudesweiler's area, mostly woodland, while the other three fifths, mostly cropland and meadow, went to Gimbweiler.

== Religion ==
Most of the residents belong to the Wolfersweiler Evangelical Church.

== Politics ==
=== Municipal council ===
The council is made up of 8 council members, who were elected by majority vote at the municipal election held on 7 June 2009, and the honorary mayor as chairman.

=== Mayors ===
- 1947–1961 Emil Schweig
- 1961–1970 Willy Jungblut
- 1971–1990 Manfred Wommer (SPD)
- 1990–2004 Walter Kreulich (SPD)
- 2004– Martin Samson

Walter Kreulich was the first mayor to be elected by direct vote by Gimbweiler's voters. Gimbweiler's current mayor is Martin Samson, and his deputies are Günter Bruch and Gerd Linn.

=== Coat of arms ===
The German blazon reads: In geteiltem Schild oben in Gold fünf bewurzelte grüne Bäume, von denen der zweite und der vierte die anderen überragen, unten ein rotbewehrter, -gezungter und -gekrönter wachsender goldener Löwe in Schwarz.

The municipality's arms might in English heraldic language be described thus: Per fess Or five trees eradicated in fess vert, the second and fourth taller, and sable issuant from base a demilion Or armed, langued and crowned gules.

The tree charge above the line of partition is an heraldic representation of the beech trees in the municipal area, while the lower charge is a reference to the village's former allegiance to the Duchy of Palatinate-Zweibrücken.

The arms have been borne since 17 February 1965.

== Culture and sightseeing ==
=== Buildings ===
The following are listed buildings or sites in Rhineland-Palatinate’s Directory of Cultural Monuments:

- Hauptstraße 12 – stately Quereinhaus (a combination residential and commercial house divided for these two purposes down the middle, perpendicularly to the street), latter half of the 19th century

== Economy and infrastructure ==
The municipality’s economy was characterized until the 1960s by agricultural operations.

=== Transport ===
==== Road ====
Affording Gimbweiler good links to the log-distance road network are Bundesstraße 41 (an east-west link between Mainz and Saarbrücken), Bundesstraße 269 (between Bernkastel-Kues and Saarlouis) and the Autobahn A 62 (Kaiserslautern–Trier), which is the most important north-south link. Furthermore, the Hunsrückhöhenstraße (“Hunsrück Heights Road”, Bundesstraße 327, a scenic road across the Hunsrück built originally as a military road on Hermann Göring’s orders), and thereby Frankfurt-Hahn Airport too, can easily be reached on Bundesstraße 269 (50 km). Running five times each day between Frankfurt-Hahn Airport and Birkenfeld is a bus service.

==== Rail ====
Gimbweiler is linked to the railway network by the station at Neubrücke, an outlying centre of Hoppstädten-Weiersbach, 3 km away. This station, on the Nahe Valley Railway (Bingen–Saarbrücken), is 45 minutes from Saarbrücken and less than two hours from Frankfurt.

=== Education ===
Since 1996, a Fachhochschule campus has been established on what was once the grounds of a United States military hospital in the neighbouring municipality of Hoppstädten-Weiersbach. The Umwelt-Campus Birkenfeld, being a location of the Trier University of Applied Sciences (Fachhochschule Trier), contributes strongly to the Birkenfeld region's economic development.

=== Sport and leisure ===
Among sport facilities is, among other things, a field used by the local sport club.
