= PVC (band) =

German punk band

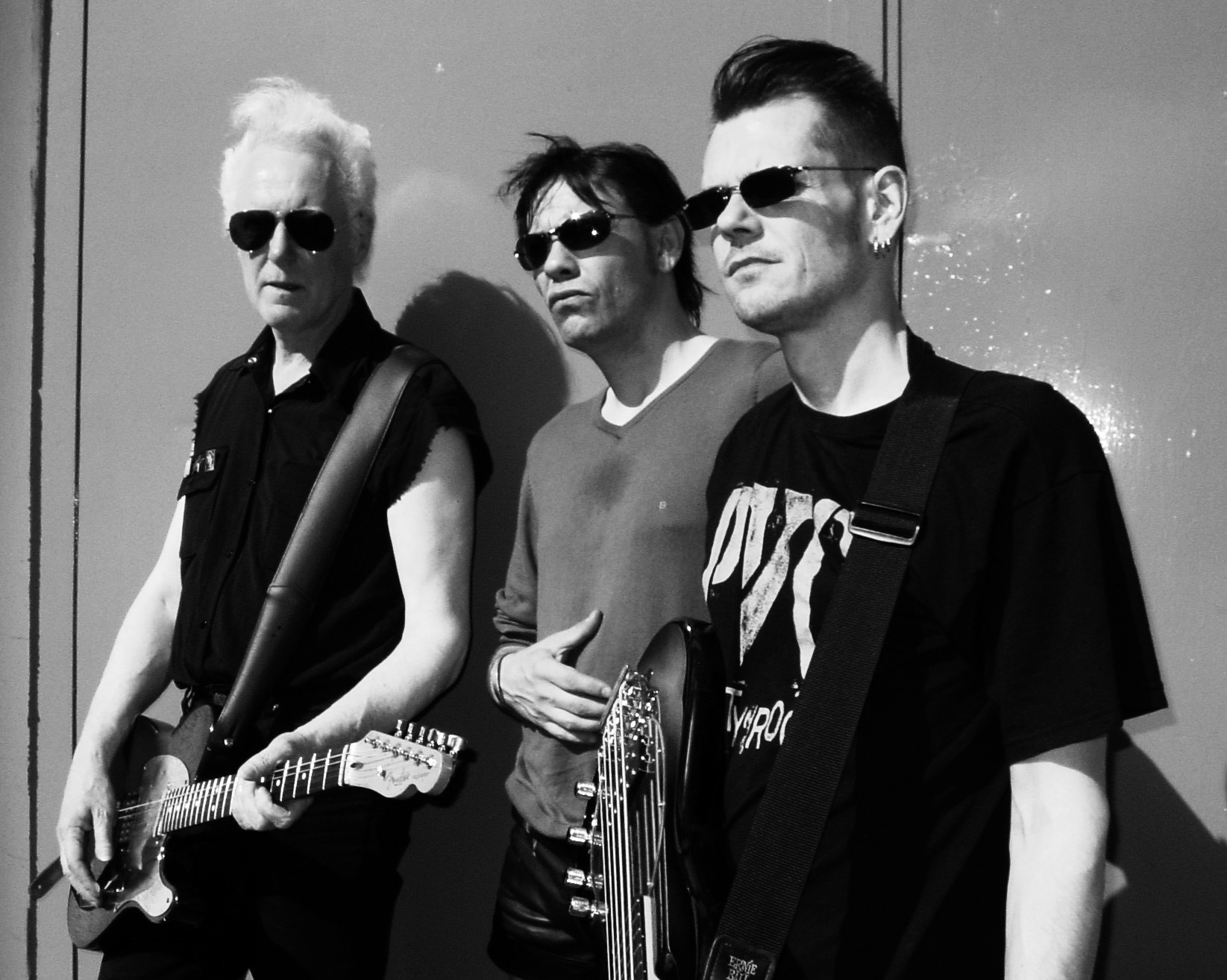
- Members of the band "PVC" from Berlin, Germany Gerrit Meijer, Tom Petersen and Rob Raw (2008)

Background information
- Origin: 1977
- Genres: Punk
- Years active: 1977-1984, 1988-1991, 2005-2012
- Members: (original members); Gerrit Meijer (guitar, vocals), Jürgen Dobroszcsyk (drums), Knut Schaller (bass, vocals)
- Past members: Raymond Ebert (guitar, vocals), Daniel Ahl (drums), onkel naie (bass), Derek Ballard (drums), Piers Headley (bass, vocals), Thorsten Kühnemann (drums), Uli Kukulies (drums), Stefan Schneider (bass, vocals), Jimmi Voxx (guitar), Trevor Watkins (vocals), Rob Raw (bass), Tom Petersen (drums)

PVC is a German punk band founded in 1977; it was the first German punk band in West-Berlin, and mainly wrote song lyrics in English. PVC's song Wall City Rock, became iconic in the rock music scene in Berlin, and is a well-known anthem of 70s punk rock in general. Their song "Berlin by Night" has been covered by many other German punk bands, including Slime. Both of these songs have been called all-time classics. On August 6, 1977, PVC put on the first official punk concert in Berlin. PVC's first band photo, which is also the cover photo of guitarist Gerrit Meijer's memoir, was taken at the Berlin Wall near Checkpoint Charlie in 1978.

The founding members of PVC were influenced by bands like The Damned, the Ramones and The Vibrators. PVC's guitarist Gerrit Meijer wrote: "In February 1976 while I was reading the New Musical Express I came across an article about the New York scene ... the Ramones were discussed, and their concept seemed to me to be the most dubious that I had ever heard of: two-minute songs, no solos, 20-minute performances. The part of this about "no solos" was very different from my own work, and so it really pushed me—encouraged by these new aspects—to right away attempt my own compositions in this style."

PVC's music is classified as somewhere in between the melodic new-wave sound (exemplified by the song "Berlin by Night") and typical punk crunchiness (exemplified by "Wall City Rock"). PVC's music up until the 1990s is considered to be classic punk, including that the musical performance was more important than the lyrics. Gerrit Meijer wrote: "In the course of the 1990s, we traveled a lot in the so-called 'new German states' where we experienced a strange thing: people in the audience at a punk concert would sit cross-legged in front of the stage, and earnestly try to listen to the lyrics, that's something we weren't used to. Often the public seemed to have difficulty in correctly classifying PVC. When people say that they could understand the lyrics better if the band would play more quietly, I respond that PVC doesn't have any special message, and it doesn't matter whether they understand the lyrics or not."

As they evolved, PVC did not feel limited to the historical definition of punk music. At later concerts, PVC quickly transitioned between punk compositions, rockabilly, and a cappella pieces; although such musical variety was popular, punk veterans were the minority in their audiences. Their classic pieces were often modified and re-envisioned as well—for example during "Wall City Rock" they would invite the audience to sing along, and "Berlin By Night" would be accompanied by cutting guitar sounds.

== History ==
The musicians Jürgen Dobroszcsyk, Raymond Ebert, Gerrit Meijer, and Knut Schaller met on February 25, 1977, at a concert of The Vibrators at Berlin's Kant-Kino. They started a band together on March 10, 1977. In 1977, PVC quickly became popular in Berlin; on August 20, 1977, they were included on a one-hour program with Barry Graves on the Berlin radio station RIAS entitled Ein Hauch von Punk (English translation: "A taste of punk"). On September 8, 1977, they played as the opener for The Vibrators; on September 12, 1977, they opened for Iggy Pop. In the following year PVC played at the Punkhouse and at the Lehniner Platz in Berlin; thereafter they played regularly at the Lehniner Platz on Wednesdays beginning in the summer of 1978. PVC played at the opening of the famous punk club SO36 in Berlin-Kreuzberg on August 12 and 13, 1978; this was 2-day festival with an estimated crowd of 700 people advertised as a Mauerbaufestival, an ironic celebration of the anniversary of the building of the Berlin Wall. Beginning in 1979, the band's line-up changed several times. After experimenting with different musical styles, PVC broke up in 1984.

In 1988, PVC reformed with the original line-up. They performed in Berlin's Quartier Latin and in Quasimodo. In 1989, PVC produced a single together with Bela B. Following that, Knut Schaller and Jürgen Dobroszcsyk took a step back from the band for health reasons and were replaced by Piers Headley and Derek Ballard. Knut Schaller died of AIDS in 1990. PVC broke up for the second time in 1991.

In 2005, Gerrit Meijer (guitar and vocals in PVC) formed a new band "Gerrit and the R’n’R Stalinists" together with Stefan Schneider on bass and Tom Petersen on drums. In April 2006, they changed the name of the new band to PVC, and advertised their upcoming show in Greifswald as PVC. In 2007, Rob Raw replaced Stefan Schneider on bass. In 2009, they played in New York, USA. In 2010 both Rob Raw and Tom Petersen left the band. They were replaced by onkel naie and Daniel Ahl. PVC's final concert was on March 10, 2012, at the Wild At Heart in Berlin-Kreuzberg. Gerrit Meijer, the only constant member of PVC, died in 2017 at the age of 70.

== Discography ==
- Hermann Nitsch Musik zur 60. Aktion, Krachorgie mit PVC Live, 20. April 1978, (Dieter Roth's Verlag 1978)
- Into The Future, Live Markthalle Hamburg, February 24, 1979, (Connekschen 1979)
- SO 36, Live SO 36, August 12/13, 1978, (SO 36 1980)
- PVC, LP, (RCA PL28481 1982)
- Berlin By Night / Can't Escape, Single, (RCA PB5968 1982)
- Mystery Gang / Satellite, Single, (RCA PB9988 1982)
- Mystery Gang / Satellite, Maxi-Single, (RCA PC5925 1982)
- PVC 77, double-LP (Good Noise GN 201/202 1983)
- Basic Colours, LP (RCA PL70250 1984)
- Pogo Dancing / The Pose, PVC + Bela B., single, (Weserlabel 2445 1989)
- Pogo Dancing / Wall City Rock / The Pose, PVC + Bela B., Maxisingle, (Weserlabel 2445 MS 02 1989)
- Pogo Dancing / Wall City Rock / The Pose, PVC + Bela B., Single-CD, (Weserlabel 2445 CD 02 1989)
- Back With A Bang, Mini-LP (Energie für Alle (ERA) 15782-104 1990)
- Back With A Bang, CD (EFA 15782-206 1990)
- PVC Punkrock Berlin (PVC 77 als CD), (Incognito Records INC 070 1995)
- PVC Wall City Rock, double-10", (Incognito Records INC 097 1997)
- PVC Wall City Rock, CD, (Incognito Records INC 098 1998)
- Berlin Punk Rock 1977-1989, Live January 30, 1979, Doppel-LP/-CD (Weird System WS 044Y9 2002)
- PVC 77-79, double-album LP, (Rottentotten RTR 13/14 2006)
- PVC Anthology 1977-2007, Doppel-LP (Incognito INC 135 2007)
- Berga By Night, Split-LP, side 1: Troublekid / side 2:PVC (super kamiokande detector SKD 003 2009)

== Literature ==
- Gerrit Meijer: Berlin. Punk. PVC – Die unzensierte Geschichte, Berlin: Neues Leben, 2016, ISBN 978-3-355-01849-4
