= Spermbirds =

German musical group

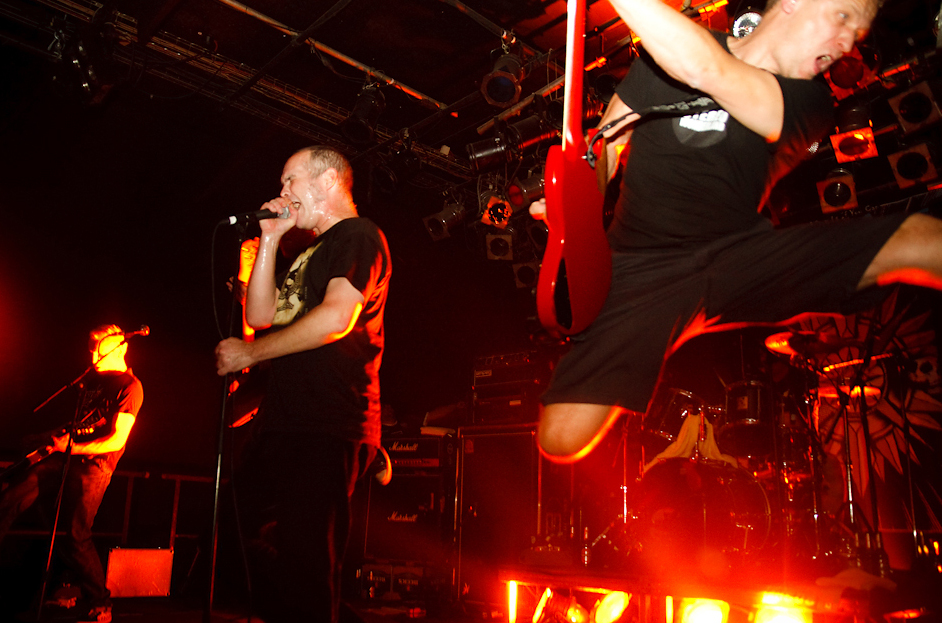
- Spermbirds live in 2010

Background information
- Origin: Kaiserslautern, Germany
- Genres: Punk rock Hardcore punk
- Years active: 1983-1988, 1989-1996, 1999-2023
- Labels: Rookie Records, We Bite Records, X-Mist Records, Common Thread Records, GUN Records, Dead Eye Records.
- Members: Lee Hobson Hollis (vocals), Steve Wiles (guitar), Roger Ingenthron (guitar), Markus Weilemann (bass), Matthias "Beppo" Götte (drums)
- Past members: Frank Rahm (guitar 1983-2007), Ken Haus (vocals 1993-1996), Joe Strübe (guitar 1983-1985).
- Website: spermbirds.com

Spermbirds are a German punk band from Kaiserslautern. Formed in 1983, by the members of the melodic punk rock band Die Walter Elf (including an American G.I. stationed in Germany as vocalist), they created a fast hardcore punk group that gained popularity in Germany and beyond.

Spermbirds’ most successful album was their 1986 debut, Something to Prove, which drew influence from many American hardcore punk bands. The cover features a picture of Cerebus the Aardvark created by Canadian comic book author Dave Sim. Sim made mention of the album in his widely column in Cerebus, saying that although the band had not obtained permission to use his artwork, he would not harass them with legal action.

Spermbirds split up in 1988 but reformed in 1989. In 2023, the band announced on their website that Spermbirds would no longer be performing together.

== Discography ==
=== Singles ===
- Don't Forget the Fun 7" EP split with Die Walter Elf (1985, X-Mist Records)
- Get on the Stage / My Brother live 7" (1987, We Bite Records) Limited To 500 Copies Only

=== Studio albums ===
- Something to Prove (1986, We Bite Records)
- Nothing Is Easy (1988, We Bite Records)
- Common Thread (1990, X-Mist Records)
- Eating Glass (1992, X-Mist Records)
- Joe (1992, X-Mist Records)
- Shit For Sale (1994, G.U.N. Records)
- Family Values (1995, G.U.N. Records)
- Set An Example (2004, Common Thread Records)
- A Columbus Feeling (2010, Rookie Records)
- Go To Hell Then Turn Left (2019, Rookie Records)

=== Live albums ===
- Thanks (1990, Dead-Eye Records)
- Get Off the Stage (1996, G.U.N. Records)

=== Compilation album ===
- Coffee, Hair and Real Life (1997)

=== DVD ===
- Spermbirds: Me and My People DVD (2007, Rookie Records)
