= Ox-Fanzine =

German punk fanzine

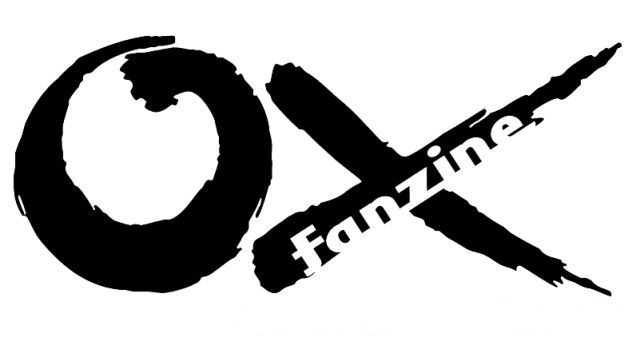
- Editor: Joachim Hiller
- Categories: Music magazine
- Frequency: Monthly
- Circulation: 10,000
- Founded: 1988
- First issue: January 1989
- Country: Germany
- Based in: Solingen
- Language: German
- Website: ox-fanzine.de
- ISSN: 1618-2103

Ox-Fanzine is a monthly punk zine from Solingen, Germany, founded in 1988. It is edited by Joachim Hiller and has had many contributors. Besides its focus on punk subculture, it also covers similar genres, reviews of comics, books and films, and has included serial novels by authors such as Klaus N. Frick.

By 2019, Ox had a circulation of 10,000 copies.

== History ==
Ox-Fanzine was founded in 1988 by Joachim Hiller and Biggi Häußler in Heidenheim an der Brenz (Southern Germany). Its first issue was published in January 1989. The zine was named after the cat of Häußler, which appeared on the first cover. After some time, Ox merged with the zine Faces the Facts and was joined by its editor Thomas Hähnel, but eventually Häußler and Hähnel left it to focus on other endeavours, leaving Hiller as the only editor. In the 1990s, Hiller relocated to Solingen in Western Germany.

Since the first issue of Ox-Fanzine there has been a page of vegetarian recipes and from there Hiller and his wife Uschi Herzer have published five cookbooks, the latest being entirely vegan. In them, several artists have collaborated with their own recipes, including Steve Albini, Mille Petrozza, Bill Gould, and Reimer Bustorff of Kettcar.

By 2005, Ox had a circulation of 12,500 copies, surpassing other German and American zines such as HeartattaCk.

On 11 February 2009, Ox-Fanzine and the music association Cow Club from Solingen organised a show celebrating the 100th issue of the magazine with Wire, Jingo De Lunch, EA80, among other bands.

On 7 February 2014, the zine celebrated its 25th anniversary with a show featuring the Ruts DC, the Generators, Asta Kask, and Vitamin X.

In January 2019, its circulation was around 10,000.

== Recognitions ==
The Frankenpost has called Ox "the most important hardcore and punk magazine in the German-speaking world." The Neue Osnabrücker Zeitung described it as the "organ of the [German punk] scene". In January 2019, the newspaper Der Freitag wrote an article about how Ox has maintained a steady audience despite the decline of music magazines.

== Books ==
- Herzer, Uschi; Hiller, Joachim, eds. (1997). Das Ox-Kochbuch: Das Ox-Kochbuch: Vegetarische und vegane Rezepte nicht nur für Punks (in German). Ventil Verlag. ISBN 9783930559305.
- Herzer, Uschi; Hiller, Joachim, eds. (2000). Das Ox-Kochbuch 2: Moderne vegetarische Küche für Punkrocker und andere Menschen (in German). Ventil Verlag. ISBN 3930559595.
- Hiller, Joachim (2003). Ox, Das Buch (in German). Ventil Verlag. ISBN 3930559897.
- Herzer, Uschi; Hiller, Joachim, eds. (2004). Das Ox-Kochbuch 3: Kochen ohne Knochen. Die feine fleischfreie Punkrock-Küche (in German). Ventil Verlag. ISBN 3931555992.
- Herzer, Uschi; Hiller, Joachim, eds. (2009). Das Ox-Kochbuch 4: Noch mehr vegetarische und vegane Punk-Rezepte (in German). Ventil Verlag. ISBN 978-3931555573.
- Herzer, Uschi; Hiller, Joachim, eds. (2012). Das Ox-Kochbuch 5: Kochen ohne Knochen - Mehr als 200 vegane Punk-Rezepte (in German). Ventil Verlag. ISBN 978-3931555283.
