= Big Balls and the Great White Idiot =

German punk rock band

- Origin: 1975
- Genres: Punk
- Years active: 1975-current
- Members: Peter Grund (drums, vocals, text), Alfred Grund (bass, vocals), Atli Grund (guitar), Wolfgang Lorenz (guitar), "Baron Adolf Kaiser" (vocals)

Big Balls and the Great White Idiot was one of the first, and one of the best known, early German punk rock bands. They were founded in Hamburg in 1975 by Peter Grund (drums, vocals, text), "Baron Adolf Kaiser" (vocals), Wolfgang Lorenz (guitar) and the Grund brothers: Alfred (bass, vocals) and Atli (guitar). The band was strongly influenced by the Sex Pistols. Their lyrics were written in English.

Performances on stage were highly aggressive; the band was known to shout at the audience to go home. "Baron Adolf" provoked the audience by wearing a Nazi uniform and a black moustache as an expression of anarchy. Punk News magazine called their sound "mean and ugly." Their reasoning was "Wir hassen alle und wollen von allen gehasst werden. Die Leute sollen durch unsere Musik zum Durchbrechen und Aufmotzen gezwungen werden, damit sie ihre Frustration merken.“ (English translation: "We hated everyone and wanted to be hated by everyone. Through our music we wanted to force people to have a break-through and feel a call to action, so that they would notice their frustration.")

== History ==
Their first album was released in 1977 by Nova/Teldec, named Big Balls. Among the 17 songs were several covers: a version of the Sex Pistols' "Anarchy in the U.K.", in this case "Anarchy in Germany," a cover of "White Light, White Heat“ by the Velvet Underground, and a cover of "Search And Destroy“ by The Stooges. In 1978 Big Balls released their second album Foolish Guys. Their next two albums, Artikel 1 and Creepy Shades, were released on their own label Balls Records, the latter bringing a change in sound away from punk.

The 1980s saw the "Balls" (with French guitarist Hervé Rozoum) more often in theaters contributing their music to various stageplays. In the 1990s, the Balls produced several albums with actor Jan Fedder as "Jan Fedder & Big Balls".

== Discography ==
- Big Balls & The Great White Idiot, LP (Nova, 1977)
- Foolish Guys, LP (Strand,1978)
- Winterhuder Fährhaus 22.04.1978, Live Cass/Album (Pope-Music-Productions, 1978)
- Artikel 1: Die Würde Des Menschen Ist Unantastbar, LP (Balls Records, 1980)
- Creepy Shades (Balls Records, 1982)
- 10 Years Balls, LP (Balls Records, 1985)
- Aus Bock (from Jan Fedder & Big Balls), (Edelton, 1998)
- In Search For Love (from Jan Fedder & Big Balls), CD (Balls Records, 1999)
- Fedder Geht's Nicht (from Jan Fedder & Big Balls) - (Warner, 2004)
