= Knochenfabrik =

German musical group

Knochenfabrik (lit. Bone Factory) is a German punk band that existed between 1994 and 1998 and reunited in 2008.

Knochenfabrik formed in its earliest lineup in Cologne, Germany in early 1994 with Claus Lüer (guitar, vocals), Achim Lauber (drums) and Gagi Ilic (bass, vocals).

Later in 1996 Gagi left the band and was replaced by Hasan Onay. During the period between 1996 and the ultimate disbanding in 1998, the released two LPs, Ameisenstaat and Cooler Parkplatz and two EPs Elvis & Kaufehlermessung. In 2001 a German punk label released a compilation with the best-known Knochenfabrik songs and some live songs, the compilation was titled Deutschmark muss sterben.

In 2008, the band reunited after 10 years, 3 years later, the band's first album since Cooler Parkplatz was released, it was titled Grüne Haare 2.0 (lit. Green Hair 2.0).

Related projects: Casanovas Schwule Seite (Claus, Hasan), Supernichts (Achim), Chefdenker (Claus)

== Albums and EPs ==
- Tag Der Deutschen Einheit (Tape, 1995; Day of German Unity)
- Elvis (EP, 1996)
- Die Anthropologin Adrienne Zihlman (Tape, 1996; The anthropologist Adrienne Zihlman)
- Ameisenstaat (CD/LP 1997; Ant state)
- Kaufehlermessung (Tape 1997; Chewing error measurement)
- Split mit Supernichts (EP 1998)
- Cooler Parkplatz (CD/LP 1998; Cool parking lot)
- Deutschmark muss sterben (2001; Deutschmark must die)
- Grüne Haare 2.0 (2011; Green Hair 2.0)
