= Full Force (music festival) =

German music festival

Coordinates: 51°34′37.74″N 12°29′41.21″E

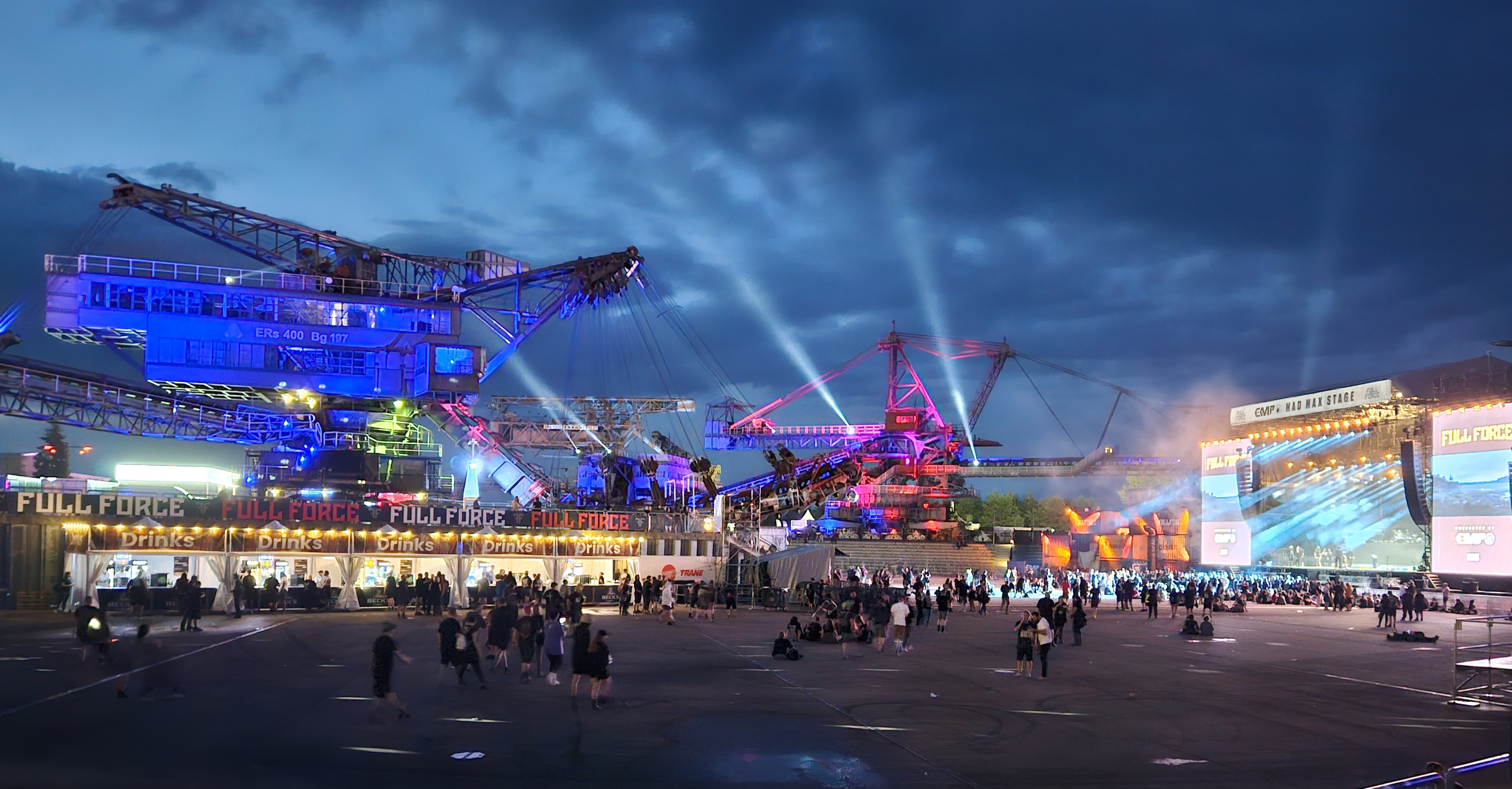
- Main stage area of Full Force
- Genre: Heavy metal, hardcore punk
- Dates: Last weekend of June or first weekend of July
- Locations: Löbnitz, Germany
- Years active: 1994–present
- Website: fullforce.de

Full Force (previously With Full Force) is a German heavy metal and hardcore punk-oriented music festival held annually since 1994.

== Lineups ==
=== 2014 ===
4 - 6 July

Amon Amarth, Architects, Being as an Ocean, Behemoth, Being as an Ocean, Blackest Dawn, Blessthefall, Bring Me the Horizon, Callejon, Carach Angren, Carnifex, Comeback Kid, Death Before Dishonor, Desolated, Der Weg einer Freiheit, Dew‐Scented, Dritte Wahl, Electric Callboy, Emil Bulls, Emmure, Finntroll, For the Fallen Dreams, Grand Supreme Blood Court, Hatebreed, His Statue Falls, Hundredth, Ignite, Kataklysm, Long Distance Calling, Madball, Malignant Tumour, Massendefekt, Memphis May Fire, Milking the Goatmachine, Moonspell, Motörhead, Nile, Nails, Obey the Brave, Of Mice & Men, Protest the Hero, Psychopunch, Rise of the Northstar, Rob Zombie, Rogers, Sepultura, Shining, Skindred, Stick to Your Guns, The Black Dahlia Murder, The Dillinger Escape Plan, The Ocean, The Unguided, Twilight of the Gods, Volbeat, Volksmetal, Walls of Jericho, We Butter the Bread With Butter, We Came as Romans

=== 2013 ===
27 - 30 June

A.O.K., Adept, After the Burial, Agnostic Front, All That Remains, Amorphis, Asking Alexandria, Bane, Betontod, Betraying the Martyrs, Between the Buried and Me, Breakdown of Sanity, Buster Shuffle, Caliban, Chelsea Grin, Cock Sparrer, Coal Chamber, Deadline, Deez Nuts, Devil Sold His Soul, Down, Every Time I Die, Flogging Molly, God Seed, Hacktivist, Hail of Bullets, Hatebreed, Haudegen, Hellyeah, Elsterglanz, Newsted, Slayer, Hämätom, H_{2}O, In Flames, Iwrestledabearonce, Kali Yuga, Krisiun, Korpiklaani, Kvelertak, Marduk, Mambo Kurt, Maroon, Naglfar, Napalm Death, Negură Bunget, Pain, Parkway Drive, Rawside, Red Fang, Ryker's, Sick of It All, Smoke Blow, Sodom, Terror, The Browning, The Devil Wears Prada, The Ghost Inside, The Other, Thy Art Is Murder, War From a Harlots Mouth, Your Demise

=== 2012 ===
29 June - 1 July

Aborted, August Burns Red, Broilers, Cannibal Corpse, Carnifex, Children of Bodom, Comeback Kid, Crushing Caspars, Dark Funeral, Debauchery, Defeater, DevilDriver, Do or Die, Dying Fetus, Ektomorf, Electric Callboy, Einherjer, Eläkeläiset, Emmure, Endstille, Evergreen Terrace, Excrementory Grindfuckers, Eyes Set to Kill, Fleshgod Apocalypse, Flogging Molly, Heaven Shall Burn, I Killed the Prom Queen, Immortal, Insomnium, Machine Head, Madball, Meshuggah, Nasty, Nasum, Neaera, Pennywise, Perkele, Poison Idea, Pro-Pain, Skeletonwitch, Smoke Blow, Soulfly, Stick to Your Guns, Street Dogs, Texas in July, The Bones, The Browning, The Carburetors, The Turbo A.C.'s, Trivium, Unearth, We Butter the Bread With Butter

=== 2011 ===
1 - 3 July

50 Lions, Adolescents, Agnostic Front, Arma Gathas, Arkona, Betzefer, Blood for Blood, Bring Me the Horizon, Bullet for My Valentine, Cancer Bats, Carnifex, Cavalera Conspiracy, Crackdown, Dead by Stereo, Deadlock, Deez Nuts, Die Apokalyptischen Reiter, Die Kassierer, Earth Crisis, Emil Bulls, Entombed, Evile, First Blood, Gallows, Grave, Hatebreed, Ill Niño, Insidious Disease, Knorkator, Kreator, Krawallbrüder, Kvelertak, Legion of the Damned, Mad Sin, Madball, Manos, Millencolin, Misery Index, Moonspell, More Than a Thousand, Omnium Gatherum, Parkway Drive, Peter Pan Speedrock, Protest the Hero, Radio Dead Ones, Samael, Satyricon, Skindred, Spermbirds, Stonewall Noise Orchestra, Sólstafir, Terror, The Black Dahlia Murder, The Casualties, The Ghost Inside, Title Fight, U.S. Bombs, Watain, Your Demise

=== 2010 ===
2 – 4 July

A Day to Remember, Amorphis, All for Nothing, Arkangel, As I Lay Dying, Bloodwork, Born From Pain, Broilers, Burning Skies, Caliban, Cannibal Corpse, Callejon, Crowbar, Dark Tranquillity, Darkened Nocturn Slaughtercult, Deadline, Death Before Dishonor, Dååth, Down by Law, Ektomorf, Elsterglanz, Evergreen Terrace, Fear Factory, Frei.Wild, Gwar, Grand Magus, Heaven Shall Burn, HORSE the band, Job for a Cowboy, Keep of Kalessin, Killswitch Engage, Lay Down Rotten, Letzte Instanz, Mambo Kurt, Marduk, Maximum Penalty, Mustasch, Neaera, Nile, NOFX, Paradise Lost, Postmortem, Sick of It All, Skarhead, Skindred, Slayer, Sodom, Stuck Mojo, Texas in July, The Bones, The Devil's Blood, The Exploited, The Faceless, The Mahones, Throwdown, Toxpack, Unleashed, Venom, Walls of Jericho, War From a Harlots Mouth, We Butter the Bread With Butter, Wisdom in Chains, Yuppicide

=== 2009 ===
3 – 5 July:

All Shall Perish, Anathema, Architects, Asphyx, August Burns Red, Backfire!, Bring Me the Horizon, Carcass, Crushing Caspars, Cro-Mags, D-A-D, Deadlock, Der W, DevilDriver, Die Kassierer, Dimmu Borgir, Down, Eisregen, Elsterglanz, Emil Bulls, End of Green, Facebreaker, God Forbid, God Seed, Hackneyed, Hatebreed, Legion of the Damned, Mucky Pup, Maroon, Mastodon, Motörhead, My Dying Bride, Nasty, Narziss, Nervecell, No Turning Back, Parkway Drive, Pestilence, Reno Divorce, Raunchy, Scarab, Sepultura, Smoke Blow, Social Distortion, Soulfly, Static-X, Stomper 98, Suicidal Tendencies, Terror, The Bouncing Souls, The Carburetors, The Red Chord, The Sorrow, Vader, V8 Wixxxer, Walls of Jericho, Warbringer

=== 2008 ===
4 – 6 July:

Agnostic Front, Belphegor, Biohazard, Born From Pain, Broilers, Brutal Truth, Bullet for My Valentine, Caliban, Cataract, Cavalera Conspiracy, Converge, Death Before Dishonor, Death by Stereo, Die Apokalyptischen Reiter, Discipline, Danko Jones, DevilDriver, Drone, Enemy of the Sun, Entombed, Ensiferum, Fall of Serenity, Hardcore Superstar, Heaven Shall Burn, Illdisposed, In Flames, Japanische Kampfhörspiele, J.B.O., Job for a Cowboy, Krisiun, Lagwagon, Life of Agony, Madball, Mad Sin, Mambo Kurt, Machine Head, Mayhem, Meshuggah, Misery Speaks, Morbid Angel, Moonspell, One Fine Day, Primordial, Pöbel & Gesocks, Psychopunch, Radio Dead Ones, Rotting Christ, Ryker's, She-Male Trouble, Six Feet Under, Slapshot, Subway to Sally, Tech N9ne, The Accidents, The Destiny Program, The Exploited, The Turbo A.C.’s, Volbeat, War From a Harlots Mouth

=== 2007 ===
29 June – 1 July:

Amon Amarth, As I Lay Dying, Backfire!, Benediction, Brujeria, Bury Your Dead, Caliban, Cannibal Corpse, Chimaira, Children of Bodom, Crushing Caspars, Crematory, Dagoba, Die Kassierer, Earth Crisis, Ektomorf, Enter Shikari, Final Prayer, Fear My Thoughts, Gorilla Monsoon, Hatebreed, Ill Niño, Kampfar, Knorkator, Korn, Lamb of God, Lousy, Manos, Maroon, Misconduct, Moonsorrow, Naglfar, Neaera, One Man Army and the Undead Quartet, Pain, Peter Pan Speedrock, Pro‐Pain, Rotten Sound, Satyricon, Sick of It All, Slayer, Smoke Blow, Sonic Syndicate, Strung Out, Sworn Enemy, Terror, The Bones, The Business, The Creetins, The Up Set, Tom Angelripper, Turisas, Unearth, Venerea, Vomitory, Walls of Jericho, Zuul FX

=== 2006 ===
30 June - 2 July

Agnostic Front, Amorphis, Arch Enemy, AOK, Born From Pain, Boysetsfire, Bullet for My Valentine, Celtic Frost, Clawfinger, Crushing Caspars, Danko Jones, Dark Fortress, Deadline, Demented Are Go!, DevilDriver, Die Krupps, Die Lokalmatadore, Disbelief, Dismember, Do or Die, Endstille, Evergreen Terrace, Fire in the Attic, First Blood, Gorefest, Graveworm, Heaven Shall Burn, Hundred Reasons, Ignite, In Extremo, In Flames, Knuckledust, Kreator, Leeway, Liar, Lumsk, Madball, Mambo Kurt, Mystic Circle, Napalm Death, Obituary, Ostkreutz, Raunchy, Rawside, Shelter, Sick of It All, Soilwork, Soulfly, Stone Sour, Synthetic Breed, The Anti Doctrine, The Black Dahlia Murder, The Haunted, The Kings of Nuthin', The Partisans, The Real McKenzies, Toxoplasma, Trivium, Volbeat, With Honor

=== 2005 ===
1 – 3 July:

Amen, Amulet, Anthrax, Anti-Flag, Barcode, Beatsteaks, Behemoth, Betzefer, Brainless Wankers, Brightside, Carpathian Forest, Cataract, Crosscut, Destiny, Dew‐Scented, Die Apokalyptischen Reiter, Die Kassierer, Discipline, Dritte Wahl, Ektomorf, Eläkeläiset, Extreme Noise Terror, Fear My Thoughts, Finntroll, Gorgoroth, God Dethroned, Haggard, Illdisposed, In Flames, Iron Maiden, Kataklysm, Killswitch Engage, Knorkator, Manos, Mark Foggo's Skasters, Maroon, Mastodon, Merauder, Misfits, Murphy's Law, Narziss, Nuclear Assault, Obituary, Pro‐Pain, Raging Speedhorn, Red Harvest, She-Male Trouble, Sick of It All, Slayer, Smoke Blow, Spawn, Stretch Arm Strong, Such a Surge, Superbutt, Terror, The Hellacopters, U.S. Bombs, Unleashed, Walls of Jericho, ZSK

=== 2004 ===
2 - 4 July

Agnostic Front, Bathory, Benediction, Biohazard, Blood for Blood, Born From Pain, Caliban, Chimaira, Dark Tranquillity, Death Angel, Despised Icon, Devildriver, Disbelief, Dimmu Borgir, Donots, E.Town Concrete, Fear Factory, Fireball Ministry, Hatebreed, HateSphere, Heaven Shall Burn, Hypocrisy, Ill Niño, Life of Agony, Malevolent Creation, Maroon, Mayhem, Mnemic, Monster Magnet, Rose Tattoo, Shadows Fall, Sick of It All, Six Feet Under, Slipknot, Soilwork, Soulfly, Street Dogs, Sworn Enemy, Terror, The Bones, The Exploited, Walls of Jericho

=== 2003 ===
4 - 6 July

Anthrax, Atreyu, Born From Pain, Caliban, Clawfinger, Cockney Rejects, Die Happy, Die Kassierer, Disharmonic Orchestra, Doro, Dritte Wahl, Entombed, Hatebreed, J.B.O., Kill Your Idols, Macabre, Madball, Ministry, Moonspell, Most Precious Blood, Naglfar, Napalm Death, Overkill, Poison Idea, Prong, Raging Speedhorn, Roger Miret and the Disasters, Saint Vitus, Samael, Sepultura, Sick of It All, Six Feet Under, Slayer, Sodom, Soulfly, Stone Sour, Subway to Sally, The Bones, The Darkness, Throwdown, Type O Negative, Youth of Today, Zyklon

=== 2002 ===
5 - 7 July

4LYN, Agnostic Front, Alec Empire, Arch Enemy, Bazzooka, Behemoth, Bethlehem, Biohazard, Cataract, Candlemass, D.R.I., Dead Kennedys, Dew‐Scented, Disharmonic Orchestra, Discipline, Down by Law, Dropkick Murphys, Finntroll, Grave, Grave Digger, Haemorrhage, Halford, Heaven Shall Burn, Hypocrisy, Immortal, Impaled Nazarene, In Extremo, J.B.O., Kataklysm, Knorkator, Kreator, Lock Up, Lousy, Machine Head, Mad Sin, Marduk, Motörhead, Nekromantix, NoMeansNo, Obscenity, Oomph!, Pro‐Pain, Pungent Stench, Raging Speedhorn, Revolver, Right Direction, Rumble Militia, Satanic Surfers, Sidekick, Slayer, Smoke Blow, Skarhead, Strife, Subway to Sally, Such a Surge, Substyle, Subzero, The Business, The Dickies, The Distillers, The Exploited, The Spook, U.S. Bombs, Union 13, Waterdown, Zimmers Hole

=== 2001 ===
22 - 24 June

4 in tha Chamber, 4LYN, Backfire!, Belphegor, Brightside, Cathedral, Cradle of Filth, Crack Up, Crowbar, D.O.A., Days of Grace, Destruction, Devin Townsend, Die Happy, Disrespect, Donots, Dritte Wahl, Emil Bulls, Farmer Boys, Gluecifer, Gurd, H-Blockx, Hypnos, Haggard, Holy Moses, Ignite, In Flames, Judas Priest, Letzte Instanz, Mad Sin, Mambo Kurt, Megadeth, Motörhead, Nashville Pussy, Napalm Death, Nevermore, NJ Bloodline, Oxymoron, Pain, Punishable Act, Reach the Sky, Ryker's, Savatage, Shutdown, Sick of It All, Six Feet Under, Skin of Tears, Soulfly, Stampin’ Ground, Suicidal Tendencies, Tankard, The Bones, The Damned, The Dickies, The Undead, Thumb, Unleashed, Umbra et Imago, Vader, Venerea, Vision, Warhammer, Zyklon

=== 2000 ===
23 - 25 June

59 Times the Pain, Agnostic Front, Angel Dust, Asphyx, Blind Passengers, Bolt Thrower, Cannibal Corpse, Cro‐Mags, Dark Funeral, Dismember, Earth Crisis, Entombed, Gorgoroth, Hardcore Superstar, Iron Maiden, J.B.O., Krisiun, Machine Head, Madball, Marduk, No Fun at All, Oomph!, Shelter, Skarhead, Slayer, The Exploited, U.S. Bombs

=== 1999 ===
Ministry, Monster Magnet, Manowar, Stormtroopers of Death, Sepultura, NOFX, 59 Times the Pain, Agnostic Front, Amorphis, Boiled Kilt, Children of Bodom, A.O.K., Beatsteaks, Bolt Thrower, Orgy, Die Schinder, Destruction, Discipline, Dritte Wahl, Enslaved, Grave Digger, Hypocrisy, Ignite, In Extremo, Immortal, Lagwagon, Mayhem, Metalium, Troopers, Mercyful Fate, Misfits, Moshquito, Oomph!, Painflow, Pitchshifter, Richthofen, H_{2}O, Pro-Pain, Ryker's, Samael, Satyricon, Six Feet Under, Skyclad, Tanzwut, Theatre of Tragedy, Terrorgruppe, Temple of the Absurd, Totenmonz

=== 1998 ===
10 - 12 July

Atrocity, Blind Guardian, Danzig, HammerFall, Iced Earth, J.B.O., Madball, Paradise Lost, Primal Fear, Pro‐Pain, Ryker's, Savatage, Sheer Terror, Slayer, Stuck Mojo, Suicidal Tendencies, Turboneger, Venom

=== 1997 ===
4 - 6 July

A.O.K., Agnostic Front, Biohazard, Bolt Thrower, Crematory, Dimmu Borgir, Dritte Wahl, Entombed, Humungous Fungus, J.B.O., Manos, Manowar, Moonspell, Obituary, Oomph!, Project Pitchfork, Rammstein, Samael, Saxon, Schweisser, Sick of It All, Such a Surge, Stormtroopers of Death, Think About Mutation, Thumb, Tiamat, Type O Negative

=== 1996 ===
22 - 23 June

Amorphis, D.R.I., Die Krupps, Dog Eat Dog, downset., Fear Factory, Front Line Assembly, Life of Agony, Ministry, Motörhead, Samael, Shelter, The Exploited, Type O Negative, Slapshot, White Zombie

=== 1995 ===
17 June

Benediction, CIV, Crematory, Madball, Morgoth, Oomph!, Ryker's, Sick of It All, Skyclad, Sodom, Think About Mutation, Tiamat

=== 1994 ===
4 June

Entombed, Mortification, Napalm Death, Sick of It All, Snapcase, Spermbirds, The Reign, Think About Mutation
