= Moderne Anstalt Rigororser Spakker =

Moderne Anstalt Rigororser Spakker (MARS) is an artist commune created by Thomas D., member of the German hip hop ensemble Die Fantastichen Vier.

An hour's drive from Cologne, Germany, it was created as a haven for various types of artists to practice their art forms without the distractions of city-life. Along with music studios, MARS contains "gorgeous architecture, beautiful furniture, a self-constructed pond, and vast skateboarding facilities." Members of the MARS commune, Time Tourists, describe it as an "innovative community of producing and performing artists living and working together far away from the rush of the cities".
