= Pinboys =

PinBoys
- Origin: Denmark
- Genres: Pop punk Alternative rock
- Years active: 2002 - 2011
- Labels: Iceberg Records, Off The Record
- Members: Jakob Thalund Møller; Anne Kalstrup; Simon Kalmar Poulsen; Emil Johnsen
- Past members: Bo Tolstrup; Anders Johnsen
- Website: http://www.pinboys.dk

PinBoys is a Danish pop punk/pop rock band that was formed in September 2002. The band consists of Jacob (vocalist/bass), Anne (vocalist), Simon (guitar) and Emil (drums). They released their first indie album Teenage Wasteland on March 15, 2007.

== History ==
Formed in Aarhus, Denmark in September 2002, the band recorded their first demo at Backyard Studios in October/November of the same year. They signed their first contract with the New York label Flytrap Records. Co-founder Sune was, however, replaced that same year on the guitar with current lead-guitarist Simon.

The band had the first live performance on 5 January 2003. On August 14 their first EP entitled A-Side was released in Denmark, Brazil and USA, and the group embarked a 16 day tour in the United States. Co-founder and singer Ane left the band just before the first CD was released, and her replacement, Stina, left just after the tour finished. Anne Kalstrup auditioned for the band in December, and joined the band as a vocalist, making it the final line-up for the band. The band's second EP, No Control was released in 2003.

In December 2004 the band signed with Iceberg Records. In 2005, the band toured in Germany and released their EP Somewhere in Between in August. In 2006, the band toured as a supporting acts for Fall Out Boy and One Fine Day (band). Their debut album Teenage Wasteland was released on 15 March 2007. The band decided to split in 2010 and played a farewell tour in 2011.

== Discography ==
=== EPs ===
1. A-Side
2. No Control
3. Somewhere in Between

=== Albums ===
1. Teenage Wasteland (2007)
2. Simple Art (2009)
