= Wolfgang Wendland =

German musician, actor, film producer and politician

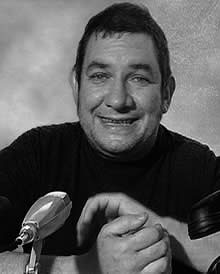
Wolfgang Wendland

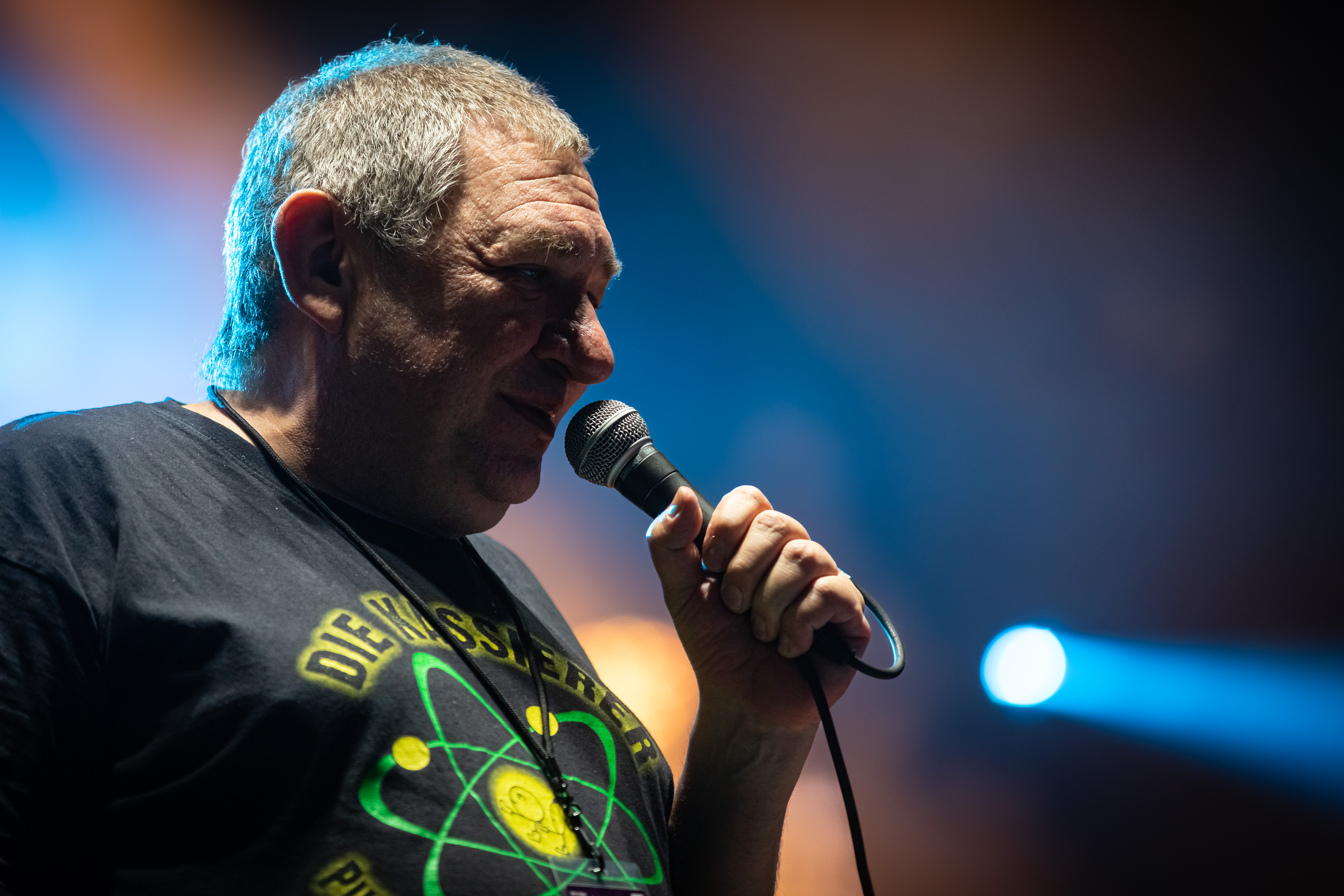
Wolfgang Wendland with "Die Kassierer" live at Rock am Ring 2022

Wolfgang Wendland (born 9 November 1962 in Lünen, Germany) is a German musician, actor, film producer and politician.

Wendland is lead singer of Die Kassierer, a German punk rock band.

In 2005, Wendland stood for leader of the German government for the Anarchist Pogo Party of Germany (APPD) using the slogans "work is shit" and "drinking, drinking". On 30 June 2009, he was elected into the local council of Wattenscheid, a sub district of Bochum, as a candidate without party on the Die Linke (Left Party) list.
