= Ekstase – The Return of Alleinunterhalter vol. 4 =

Studio album by Mambo Kurt
- Released: 2002
- Genre: Comedy, Pop
- Label: Virgin Music

Mambo Kurt chronology
Back in Beige – The Return of Alleinunterhalter vol. II (2000)	Ekstase – The Return of Alleinunterhalter vol. 4 (2002)	Sun of a Beach – The Return of Alleinunterhalter vol. 5 (2004)

Ekstase – The Return of Alleinunterhalter vol. 4 is the third album from German comedy artist Mambo Kurt. this album includes collection of bizarre covers, including the intro to Slayer's Raining Blood.

== Track listing ==
1. Intro (Raining Blood-Slayer)
2. Brazil (Mambo Kurt)
3. I Just Call To Say I Love You (Stevie Wonder)
4. Sweet Child Of Mine (Guns N' Roses)
5. Zu spät (Die Ärzte)
6. Mädchen Medley (contains various songs remade by Mambo Kurt)
7. Petra (Alle Mädchen wollen immer nur das eine) (Mambo Kurt)
8. Killing An Arab (The Cure)
9. Just Can't Get Enough (Depeche Mode)
10. Leck mich an den Füßen (Mambo Kurt)
11. Nigger (Clawfinger)
12. 80's Medley (Final Countdown-Europe/Eye Of The Tiger-Survivor/Jukebox-(Foreigner (band))
13. How You Remind Me (Nickelback)
14. Der Kiffer-Walzer (Mambo Kurt)
15. Hells Bells (AC/DC)
16. Polonaise (Mambo Kurt-Hidden Track-Kate Bush Wuthering Heights)
