= Die Kassierer =

German punk band

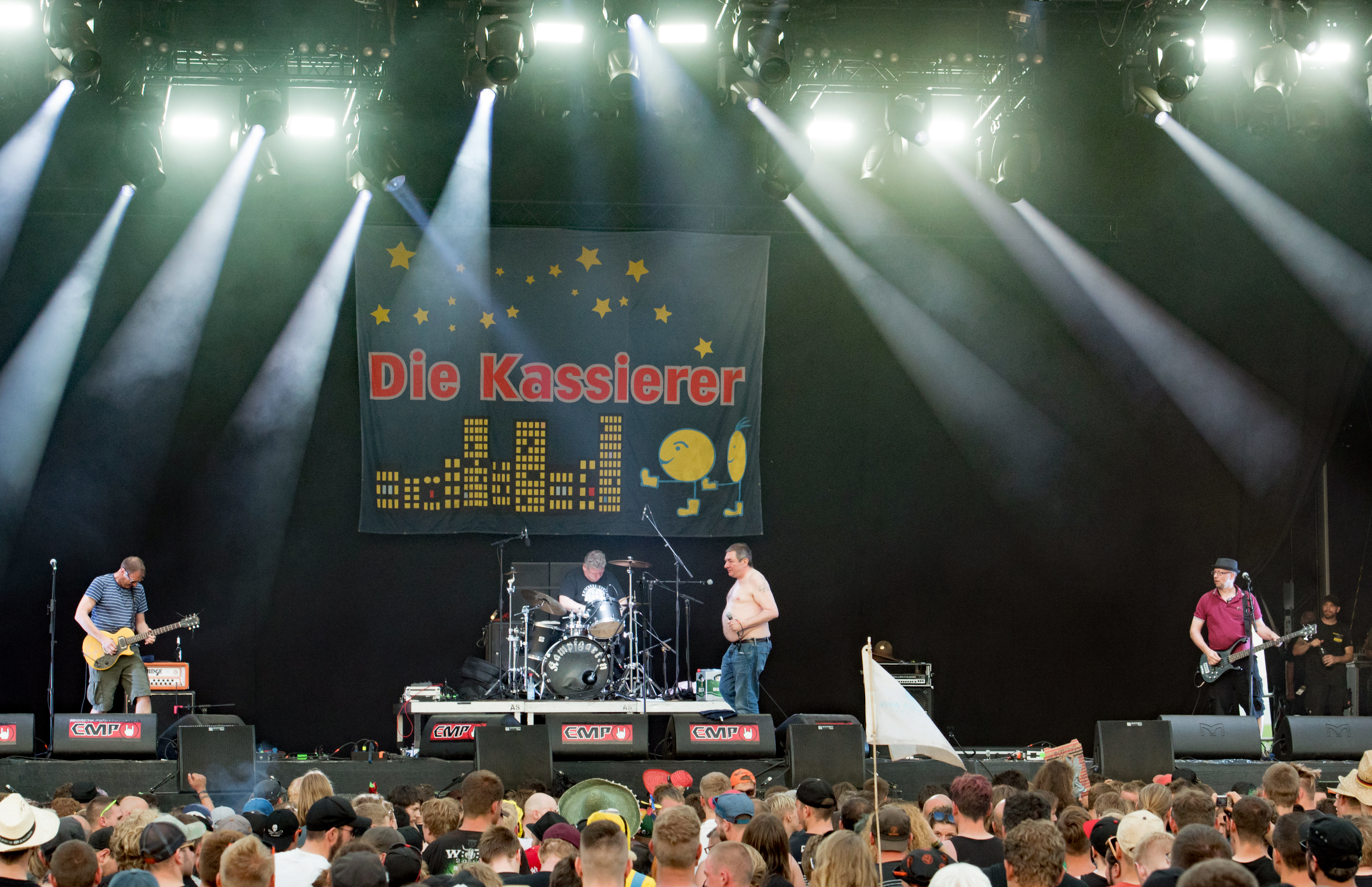
- Die Kassierer, 2016 Reload Festival

Background information
- Origin: Bochum-Wattenscheid, Germany
- Genres: Punk, Fun-Punk
- Years active: 1985–present
- Members: Wolfgang Wendland; Mitch Maestro; Volker Kampfgarten; Nikolaj Sonnenscheiße
- Past members: Uwe Schmidt "Der Rote"; Wah-Wah Weigel; Pahel Brunis
- Website: kassierer.de

The logo of the group

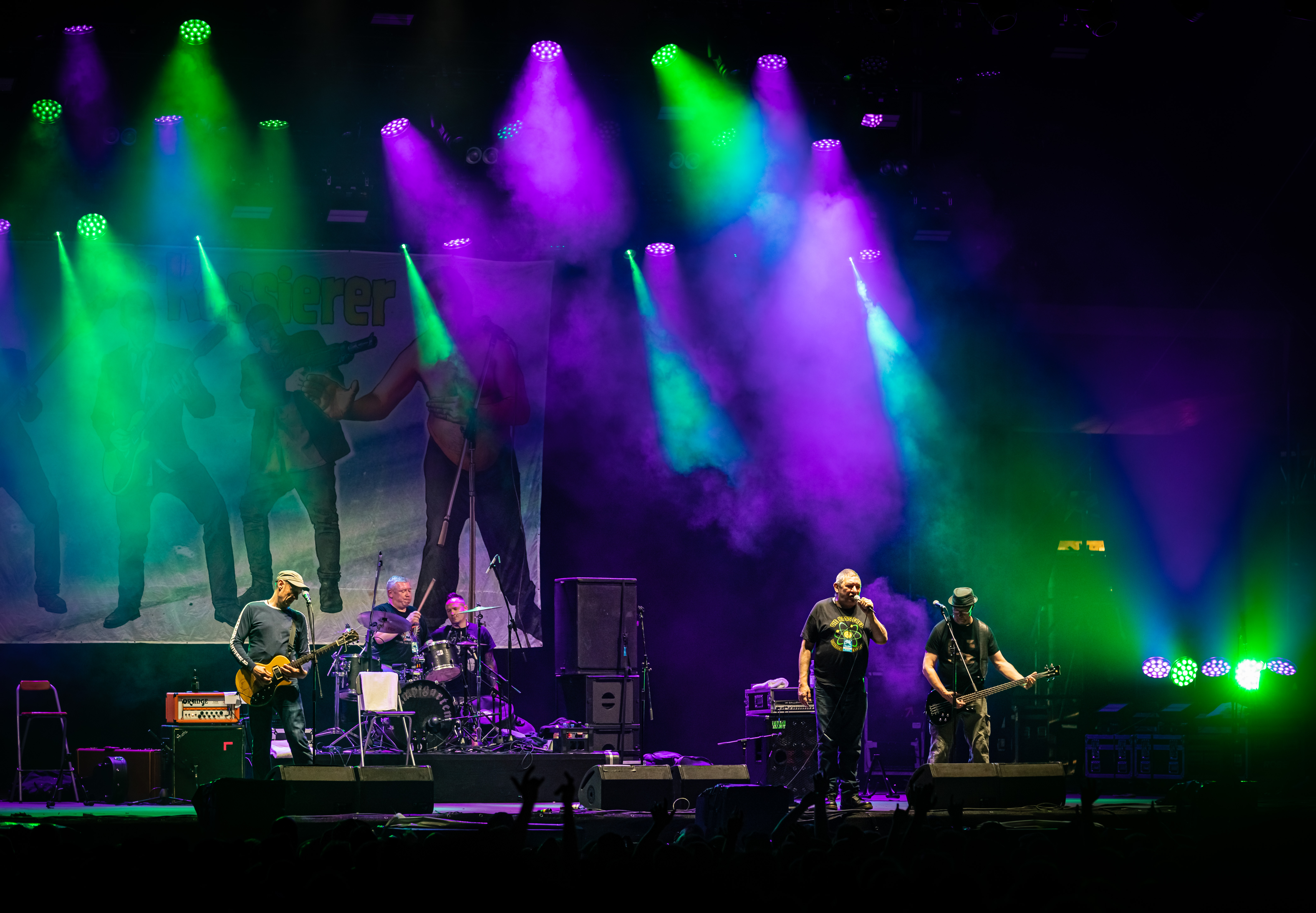
Die Kassierer live at Rock am Ring 2022

Die Kassierer ("The Cashiers"), also Die mächtigen Kassierer ("The Mighty Cashiers"), are a satirical punk band from Bochum-Wattenscheid, Germany. The group was founded in 1985 by Wolfgang Wendland (vocals), Nikolai Sonnenscheiße (guitar), Volker Kampfgarten (drums, jazz guitar) and Mitch Maestro (bass guitar).

The lyrics of Die Kassierer's songs are mainly about drugs, sex, violence, strange phenomena – such as aliens – and the region the band comes from. Generally their lyrics are extremely satirical and therefore often misunderstood.

Die Kassierer have been criticized for making what has been considered aggressive and socially as well as sexually disorienting music, but up to now only the album Habe Brille (I got glasses) has been officially indexed as harmful by the "Bundesprüfstelle für jugendgefährdende Medien" (Federal Department for Media Harmful to Young Persons). This indexing was due to the original album's pornografic cover. Shortly after the indexing the cover was changed, so that the LP was acceptable for sale in Germany again. Further attempts to label other LPs of Die Kassierer have been blocked by the courts because their songs were deemed satirical and socially critical enough to qualify as art.

In honor of the 20th anniversary of the band in 2005 nineteen artists, including the Donots, Die Lokalmatadore, Hennes Bender, Emscherkurve 77 and Mambo Kurt recorded songs of Die Kassierer for a tribute album, also called "Kunst". Bela B. and Rodrigo González from Die Ärzte played under the pseudonym 2 fickende Hunde (2 Fucking Dogs). 4 years before Die Kassierer had played a song for the Die Ärzte- tribute sampler "GötterDÄmmerung". They had transformed the song "Du willst mich küssen" (You want to kiss me) into "Du willst mich fisten" (You want to fist me).

== Famous songs ==
- "Mein Glied ist zu groß" (My Dick is Too Big)
- "Ich töte meinen Nachbarn und verprügel seine Leiche" (I Kill My Neighbor and Beat Up His Corpse)
- "Sex mit dem Sozialarbeiter" (Sex with the Social Worker)
- "Menschenkatapult" (People Catapult)
- "Tot, tot, tot" (Dead, Dead, Dead)
- "Gott hat einen IQ von 5 Milliarden" (God has an IQ of 5 Billion)
- "Abschaum der Nacht" (Scum of the Night)
- "Wenn das Wasser der Ruhr... blondes Pils wär" (If Only the Water in the Ruhr River was Golden Pilsner...)
- "Bin ich oder hab ich?" (Am I or Have I?)
- "Kommste mit ins Stadion?" (Wanna Come Along to the Stadium?)
- "Im Jenseits gibts kein Bier" (In the Afterlife There is No Beer)
- "Thomas Wenner" (Thomas Wenner was the chief of the police of Bochum and had a bitter argument with Wolfgang Wendland)
- "Sauerlandlied" (Sauerland Song)
- "Mit meinem Motor" (With my Motor)
- "Das Leben ist ein Handschuh" (Life is a Glove)
- "Ich onaniere in den kopflosen Rumpf von Uwe Seeler" (I Masturbate into the Headless Trunk of Uwe Seeler)
- "Das Schlimmste ist, wenn das Bier alle ist" (The worst Thing is, When the Beer is Gone)
- "Blumenkohl am Pillemann" (Cauliflower on my Wiener)
- "Erdrotation" (Earth Rotation)

== Albums ==
- 1987: "Fit durch Suizid" (Fit through Suicide) (production stopped in 1994)
- 1989: "Sanfte Strukturen" (Gentle Structures)
- 1993: "Der heilige Geist greift an" (The Holy Spirit Attacks)
- 1995: "Goldene Hits, teilweise in Englisch" (Golden Hits, Partly in English)
- 1997: "Habe Brille" (I Got Glasses)
- 1998: "The Gentlemen of Shit" (completely in English)
- 1998: "Taubenvergiften" (Poisoning Pigeons) / cover CD of songs from Georg Kreisler
- 2000: "Musik für beide Ohren" (Music for Both Ears)
- 2000: "Jetzt und in Zukunft öfter" (Now and Even More Often in the Future)
- 2003: "Männer, Bomben, Satelliten" (Men, Bombs, Satellites)
- 2005: "Kunst - 19 Künstler und sie selber spielen Lieder der Kassierer" (Art - 19 Artists and they themselves play songs of Die Kassierer)
- 2006: "Das schlimmste ist, wenn das Bier alle ist" (The Worst Thing Is, When the Beer is Gone) (split with Too Strong).
- 2010: "Physik" (Physics)

== Other sources ==
- Wahlwerbung: APPD-'Skandalspot' nicht mehr im TV, Stern, 12 September 2005
