= 4Lyn =

German rock band

4LYN
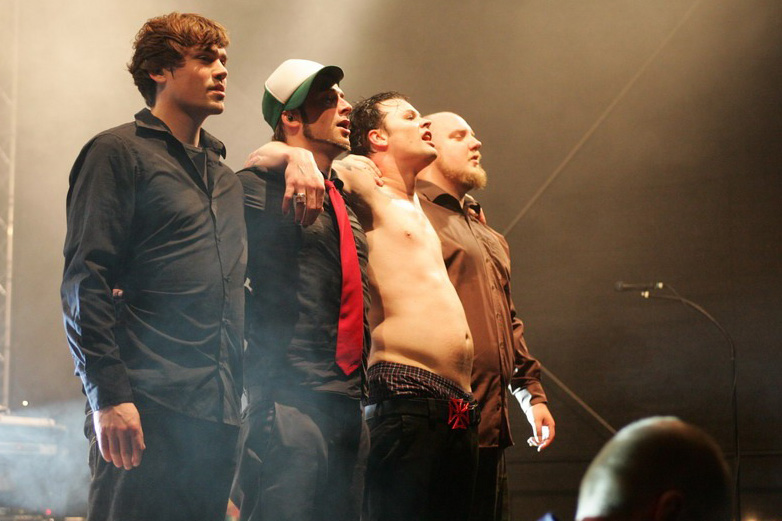
- 4LYN at the March 1 Festival, 2007

Background information
- Origin: Hamburg, Germany
- Genres: Nu metal; rap metal; alternative metal
- Years active: 1995–2013
- Members: Ron Cazzato; Dennis Krüger; Björn "Deee" Düßler; Sascha "Chi(no)" Carrilho
- Past members: Daniel Könnecke; Benjamin Eckebrecht; Lidija Jessel; René "Russo" Knupper
- Website: http://www.4lyn.com/

4Lyn was a nu metal band from Hamburg, Germany. 4Lyn began their career as Headtrip in 1995 as high schoolers. They recorded demos and played locally, and in 2000 a gig at the Ohrenschmaus Festival in Hamburg got them attention from label scouts. "4Lyn" is an acronym of sorts; 4 is the number of band members, and LYN stands for "Little Young Nasties".

They released their debut self-titled record on Universal Records subsidiary Motor Music in 2001, and toured with Papa Roach, Thumb, Therapy?, Cosmotron, and Dredg. They recorded their sophomore effort, Neon, in Denmark, then toured throughout central Europe. They left Motor Music to sign with Edel Music for their third release, Take it as a Compliment, issued in 2004. In 2005 they wrote a theme song entitled "Go Sea Devils" for the Hamburg Sea Devils, a football team. 2007 saw the release of their self-produced album, Compadres.

In January 2008, the band released the album Hello. Then, as a gift to loyal fans, the band released a live album, Live In Hamburg, which could only be purchased through the band's official website (which had gone offline since their breakup; the band's official Facebook page has taken over as their main website).

In May 2008, a statement on the band's official website confirmed the departure of Rene Knupper, who left the band to pursue "other life experiences". The departure was amicable and he remains friends with the band. Dennis Krüger then joined the band full-time as lead guitarist.

Their latest album Quasar was released in May 2012.

In 2013, a statement posted in German on the band's official website confirmed that the band had decided to part ways permanently. The band played a number of farewell shows that year, and changed their Facebook profile image to a band logo with the numbers 1998–2013 underneath.

== Members ==
Final Lineup

- Sascha "Chino" Carrilho - drums (1995–2013)
- Björn Düßler - bass (1995–2013)
- Ron "Braz" Cazzato - vocals (1995–2013)
- Dennis Krüger - guitar (2008–2013)

Previous Members

- Rene "Russo" Knupper (?–2008)
- Daniel Könnecke (?–1999)
- Benjamin "Kane Wikked" Eckebrecht - guitar (?–2001)
- Lidija Jessel - vocals (1998-2000)
- Niels Twardawa (?–1998)

== Discography ==
Albums

- 4Lyn (Motor Music, 2001)
- Neon (Motor Music, 2002)
- Take it as a Compliment (Edel Music, 2004) #45 (Germany Albums Top 50)
- Compadres (Edel Music, 2005)
- Hello (Rodeostar, 2008)
- Live In Hamburg (Rodeostar, 2008)
- Quasar (Very Us, 2012)

DVDs

- Take It as a Compliment/Live Compliments, Tour Edition (2004)
- Live in Hamburg (2008)
- The Good Life Period (2008)

Singles

Year	Single	DE	Album
2001	"Whooo"	—	LYN
2001	"Bahama Mama"	—	LYN
2001	"Lyn"	56	LYN
2001	"Pure"	—	LYN
2002	"Pearls & Beauty"	65	Neon
2002	"Husky"	—	Neon
2002	"Blitzkrieg Bop"	—	single only
2002	"Whooo (Soccer Slam Version)"	89	single only
2004	"Kisses Of A Strobelight"	98	Take It As A Compliment
2004	"Matilda, Matilda"	—	Take It As A Compliment
2005	"Drrty Rokka"	—	Compadres
2007	"Hello (For You I'm Dying)"	—	Hello
2007	"Go, Sea Devils"	—	single only
2012	"Club Exploitation"	—	Quasar
