= Sun of a Beach – The Return of Alleinunterhalter vol. 5 =

Sun of a Beach - The Return of Alleinunterhalter vol. 5

Live album by Mambo Kurt
- Released: 2004
- Genre: Comedy, Pop
- Label: Virgin Music

Mambo Kurt chronology
Ekstase – The Return of Alleinunterhalter vol. 4 (2000)	Sun of a Beach - The Return of Alleinunterhalter vol. 5 (2004)	Organized Crime (2005)

Sun of a Beach – The Return of Alleinunterhalter vol. 5 is the 4th album from German comedy act Mambo Kurt. This album was recorded live and features Mambo's 80-year-old Hammond organ teacher, Heidi Schulz, singing covers of "Anarchy in the UK" and "Sympathy for the Devil".

== Track listing ==
1. No One Knows (Queens of the Stone Age)
2. Are You Gonna Go My Way (Lenny Kravitz)
3. Polka-Medley-Paloma Blanca-Sun Of Jamaika-All That She Wants
4. Thunderstruck (AC/DC)
5. Sunshine Reggae (Laid Back)
6. Rock Your Body (Justin Timberlake)
7. Anarchy in the UK (Sex Pistols)
8. Number of the Beast (Iron Maiden)
9. Disco-Tiger (Mambo Kurt)
10. Enter Sandman (Metallica)
11. In Da Club (50 Cent)
12. Hot in Herre (Nelly)
13. Breit Und Weit (Mambo Kurt)
14. Through and Through (Life of Agony)
15. In the Shadows (The Rasmus)
16. Angel of Death (Intro) (Slayer)
17. Sheena Is a Punk Rocker (The Ramones)
18. Der Dritte Mann (Anton Karas)
19. Sympathy for the Devil (The Rolling Stones)
