= Back in Beige – The Return of Alleinunterhalter vol. II =

Studio album by Mambo Kurt
- Released: 2002
- Genre: Comedy, Pop
- Label: Virgin Music

Mambo Kurt chronology
The Return of Alleinunterhalter (1998)	Back in Beige – The Return of Alleinunterhalter vol. II (2002)	Ekstase – The Return of Alleinunterhalter vol. 4 (2002)

Back in Beige – The Return of Alleinunterhalter vol. II is the second album by German covers artist Mambo Kurt. Track 5 features Tom Angelripper.

== Track listing ==
1. Damenwahl (Mambo Kurt)
2. I Was Made For Loving You (KISS)
3. Du trägst keine Liebe in Dir (Echt)
4. Highway To Hell (AC/DC)
5. Die Flut featuring Tom Angelripper (Witt/Heppner)
6. You're My Heart You're My Soul (Modern Talking)
7. Rap Medley (WooHa-Busta Rhymes/The Message-Grandmaster Flash/Walk This Way-Aerosmith)
8. Join Me (In Death) (HIM)
9. Schnulzen Medley (Nothing Compares 2 U-Prince/Candle In The Wind (Original Version) -Elton John/My Heart Will Go On-Celine Dion)
10. Rockin' All Over The World (Status Quo)
11. Andreas Pils (Mambo Kurt)
12. Bloodhound Gang Medley (Fire Water Burn/Bad Touch/"Along Comes Mary"/Bad Touch reprise)
13. Metall Medley (Black no. 1 (Little Miss Scare-All) -Type O Negative/Mother-Danzig/Nothing Else Matters-Metallica)
14. Es geht voran (Fehlfarben)
15. Born To Make You Happy (Britney Spears)
