= Breakdown of Sanity =

Swiss metalcore band

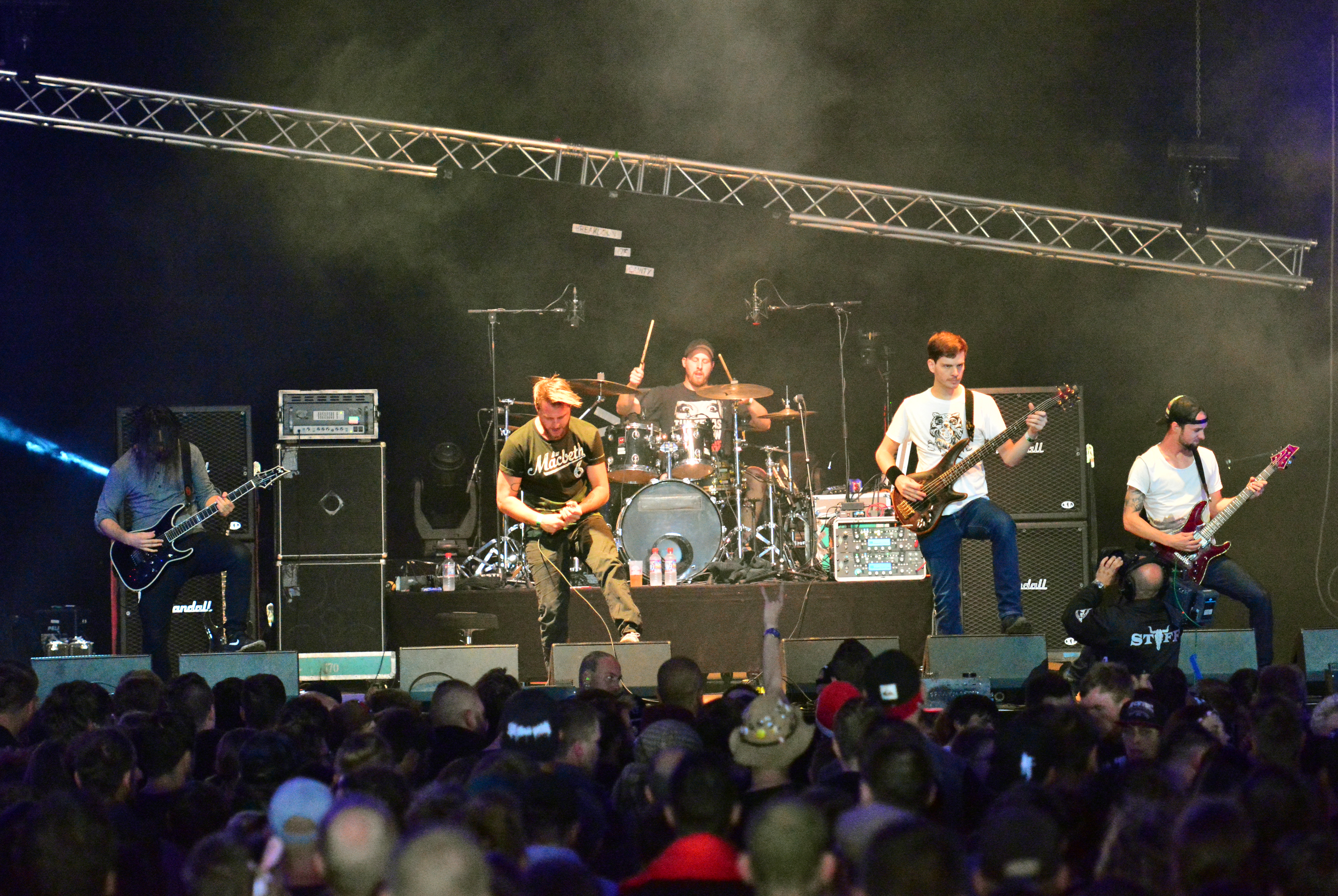
- The band at Wacken Open Air in 2015

Background information
- Origin: Bern, Switzerland
- Genres: Metalcore; deathcore; nu metal; melodic metalcore; post-grunge
- Years active: 2007–present
- Members: Kivi Brändle; César Gonin; Christoph Gygax; Oliver Stingel; David Stutzer
- Past members: Sandro Keusen; Carlo Knöpfel; Thomas Rindlisbacher
- Website: www.breakdownofsanity.com

Breakdown of Sanity (also known as BoS) is a Swiss metalcore/deathcore band from Bern, formed in 2007 by lead guitarist and songwriter Oliver Stingel.

== History ==
In early 2007, after the break-up of his previous band Paranoia, lead guitarist and lyricist Oliver "Oly" Stingel began writing new songs from home. Singer Carlo Knöpfel, who was then guitarist of the band Nerph, joined, followed by bassist César Gonin, also of Paranoia. In December, they recruited drummer Thomas Rindlisbacher, followed by rhythm guitarist Sandro Keusen. Keusen, however, decided to leave the band in early 2009 and was replaced with Christoph Gygax.

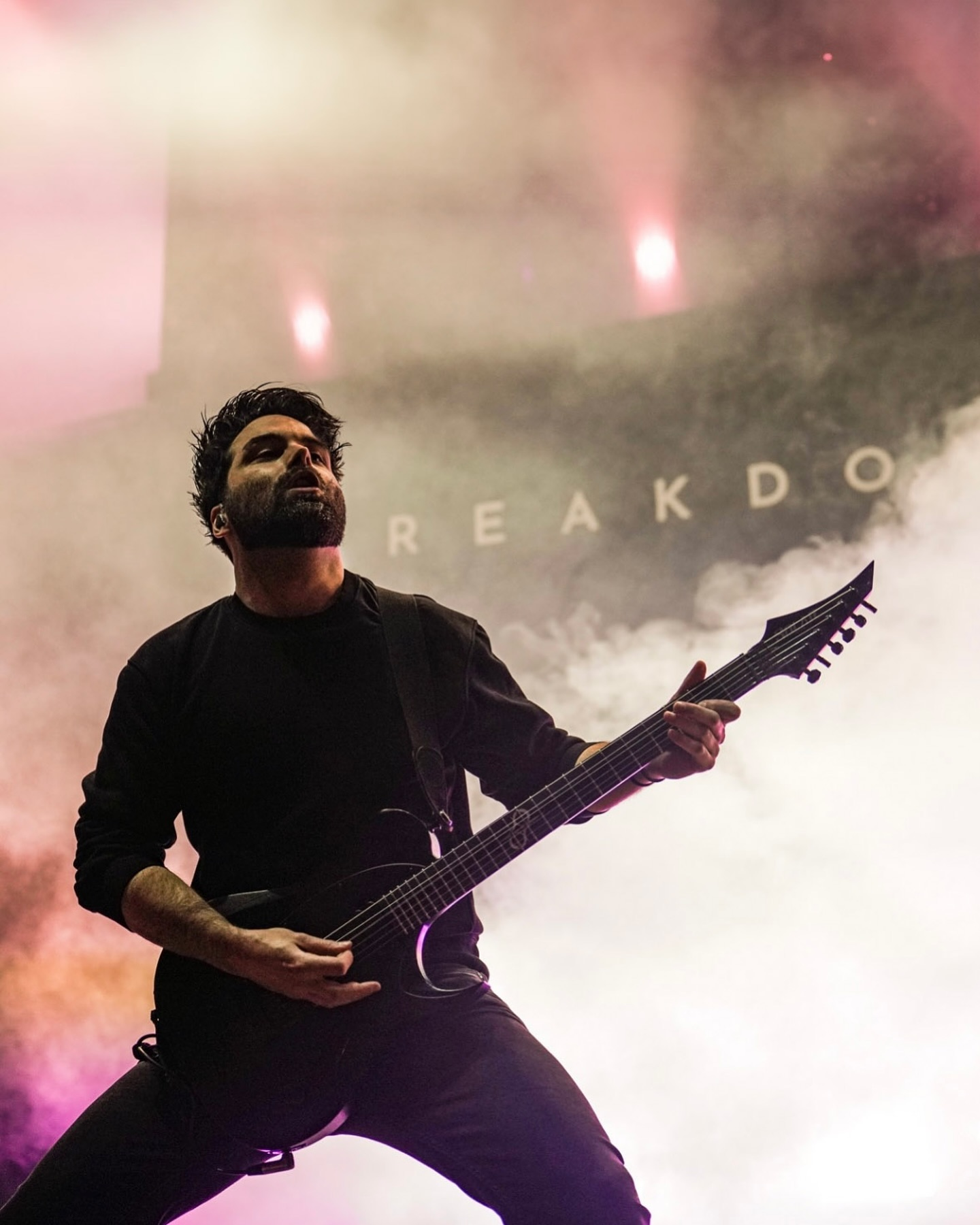
Oly Stingel, the band's founder and guitarist, at Impericon Festival, 2025

In early 2009, the band released their debut studio album, The Last Sunset, which was entirely produced and self-financed by Stingel. The band refers to this album more as a demo.

They released their second album, Mirrors in 2011, which was again self-released and produced by Stingel. On 23 December 2011, they released their first single, "Chapters".

In 2013, the band toured with August Burns Red and Architects and played at the With Full Force festival. In October of the same year, they released their third self-produced album Perception.

They released their fourth self-produced album Coexistence in 2016, which peaked at 28th on the Swiss Hitparade.

The band took a break in 2017, before returning in 2020, releasing the single "Traces" in September, followed by "Black Smoke" the following year. In 2023, they released the single "Collapse", followed by "Echoes of the Void" in July 2024 and "Perfect Enemy" in December 2024. All singles were self-produced and released. In 2024, the band also released the single Purge in collaboration with the Czech metalcore band Abbie Falls.

In 2024, the band also started touring again, with their stage comeback taking place at the Impericon Festivals in spring 2024. Drummer Thomas Rindlichsbacher was unable to return to the stage for health reasons and was replaced by David Stutzer, who had already filled in as drummer for some shows in the past. The band later introduced Stutzer as the band's new official drummer.

At the end of 2024, singer Carlo Knöpfel left the band for his own reasons, with his last concert with the band taking place in December 2024 at Bierhübeli in Bern. In October 2024, the band launched a public singer audition.

On May 2nd 2025, they released a new single called "The Hunt", along with a music video. They also announced their new Vocalist, Kivi Brändle.

On July 31st of 2026, the band started teasing something. On August 13th they announced that they would be releasing their 5th album in 10 years since Coexistence.

== Members ==
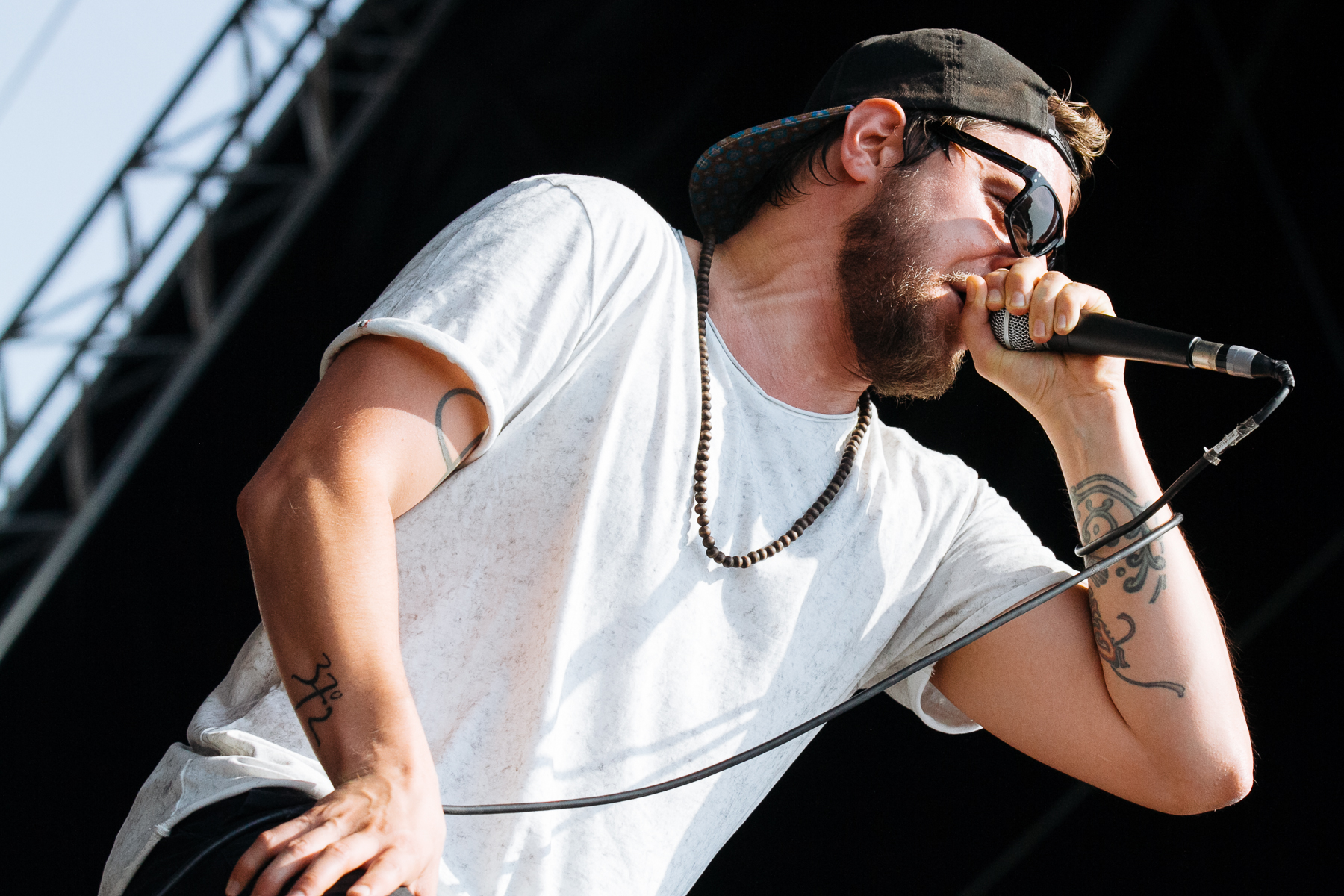
Former lead singer Carlo Knöpfel in 2015

=== Current ===
- Kivi Brändle – Vocals (2025–present)
- César Gonin – Bass (2007–present)
- Christoph Gygax – Rhythm guitar (2008–present)
- Oliver Stingel – Lead guitar (2007–present)
- David Stutzer – Drums (2025–present)

=== Past ===
- Sandro Keusen – Rhythm guitar (2007–2008)
- Carlo Knöpfel – Vocals (2007–2024)
- Thomas Rindlisbacher – Drums (2007–2023)

== Discography ==
=== Albums ===
- The Last Sunset (2009)
- Mirrors (2011)
- Perception (2013)
- Coexistence (2016)
- REVERIES (2026)

=== Singles ===
- Chapters (2011)
- My Heart In Your Hands (re-recorded) (2014)
- Traces (2020)
- Black Smoke (2021)
- Collapse (2023)
- Echoes of the Void (2024)
- Perfect Enemy (2024)
- Purge (with Abbie Falls, 2024)
- The Hunt (2025)
- Torn Pages (2026)
- Hibernate (2026)
