= The Return of Alleinunterhalter =

Studio album by Mambo Kurt
- Released: 1999
- Recorded: 1998–1999
- Genre: Comedy, pop
- Label: Virgin Music

Mambo Kurt chronology
Lieder zur Weihnachtszeit (1998)	The Return of Alleinunterhalter (1999)	Back in Beige - The Return of Alleinunterhalter vol. II (2000)

The Return of Alleinunterhalter is the debut album by German cover artist Mambo Kurt.

== Track listing ==
1. "Engel" (Rammstein)
2. "Waiting Room" (Fugazi)
3. "Nowhere" (Therapy?)
4. "Creep" (Radiohead)
5. "Basket Case" (Green Day)
6. "Paradise City" (Guns N' Roses)
7. Medley ("Born Slippy"-Underworld/"Sonic Empire"-Westbam/"Remember Me"-Blue Boy)
8. "Come as You Are" (Nirvana)
9. "Cantaloop" (Us3)
10. "Bombtrack" (Rage Against the Machine)
11. "Insomnia" (Faithless)
12. "Musik ist Trumpf" (Mambo Kurt)
13. "Time to Wonder" (Fury in the Slaughterhouse)
14. "Jump" (Van Halen)
15. "You'll Never Walk Alone" (Traditional)
