= Organized Crime (Mambo Kurt album) =

Studio album by Mambo Kurt
- Released: June 21, 2005
- Genre: Comedy, pop
- Label: Virgin Music

Mambo Kurt chronology
| Sun of a Beach - The Return of Alleinunterhalter vol. 5 (2004) | Organized Crime (2005) |

Professional ratings
Review scores
| Source | Rating |
|---|---|
| Allmusic | 4/5 stars |

Organized Crime is an album from German comedy pop act Mambo Kurt. This album is a compilation album and it is his first album to be released overseas.

== Track listing ==
1. Thunderstruck (AC/DC)
2. In The Shadows (The Rasmus)
3. Hells Bells (AC/DC)
4. Sheena Is A Punkrocker (The Ramones)
5. Anarchy In The UK (Sex Pistols)
6. Basket Case (Green Day)
7. Prince Of The Rodeo (Turbonegro)
8. The Number Of The Beast (Iron Maiden)
9. Engel (Rammstein)
10. Killing An Arab (The Cure)
11. I Was Made For Loving You (KISS)
12. The Final Countdown (Europe)
13. Sunshine Reggae (Laid Back) (bonus track)
