= Son Goku (band) =

German rock band

- Origin: Germany
- Genre: Rock
- Years active: 2002–2003
- Label: Four Music/EMI
- Past members: Thomas D Komi Togbonou; Bertil Mark; Axel Hilgenstöhler; Jochen "Beat Down" Hornung; Paul J Greco
- Website: ThomasD.net

Son Goku was a German rock band who played a mix of hardcore punk, alternative, reggae, and electronic sounds. The band was named after the Son Goku character in the Dragon Ball series. Son Goku's first and only album, Crashkurs (Crash course), was released in 2002 and reached a peak position of 15 on the Media Control Charts. The group has since disbanded due to "dissension" amongst the members.

== History ==
=== Origins ===
Son Goku was a side project of Thomas D of Die Fantastischen Vier. The band originated from the M.A.R.S. (Moderne Anstalt Rigoroser Spakker, or Modern Institute of Adamant Spakkers), a commune of artists and musicians founded by Thomas D in 1998. Thomas D named the band after Son Goku, the protagonist of the Dragon Ball animated series, as the character embodied the band's philosophy; he stated he was "fascinated by Goku's naïveté and cheerfulness, yet, at the same time, a great warrior saving the world".

=== Music ===
Son Goku was formed with the "desire for a new form of expression and a fresh sound", resulting in a mix of hardcore punk, alternative, reggae, and electronic sounds. Established band members and access to their own recording studio at the M.A.R.S. commune allowed for experimentation with the genres.

Son Goku's only single, "Alle für jeden", was released on 17 June 2002, followed by the album Crashkurs on 29 July 2002.

Son Goku disbanded on or before 1 January 2003, due to 'dissension' amongst the members.

== Band members ==
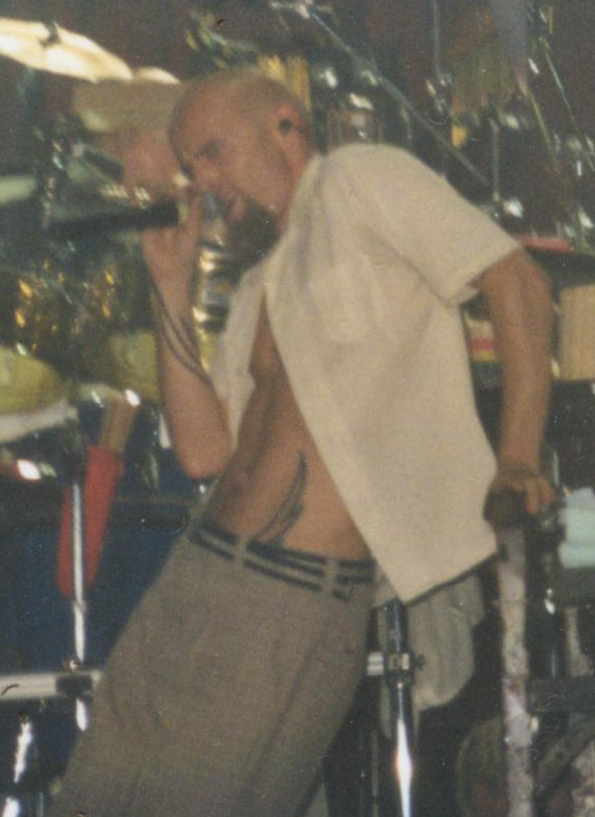
Thomas D

=== Thomas D ===
Thomas D is best known as a member of the German hip hop group Die Fantastischen Vier. He had also undertaken previous solo projects. Son Goku was the first in which he did not rap. Thomas D founded Son Goku with Bertil Mark and provided vocals and lyrics for the band.

=== Komi Togbonou ===
Komi Togbonou had played in the band Gajanaut and provided vocals and played digeridoo for Nina Hagen, Die Fantastischen Vier und Thomas D in both studio and concert settings. Togbonou provided vocals and lyrics for Son Goku.

=== Bertil Mark ===
Bertil Mark was born in 1976 and had his first performance experience in a youth theater production of Joseph and the Amazing Technicolor Dreamcoat. Mark had worked with other German bands including, among others, 5 Sterne Deluxe and Fettes Brot. Since 1999, Mark had been producing for his own studio, Haus Erika Productions, and for the M.A.R.S. commune. Mark was Son Goku's drummer and producer.

=== Axel Hilgenstöhler ===
Axel Hilgenstöhler was the guitarist of "Thumb" for 7 years and was involved in production and songwriting for Clueso, MC Lenny, Ferris MC, Tyree Cooper, Tyrone Rickets, Virginia Nasiamento and Africa Islam. Hilgenstöhler had also toured with bands such as Henry Rollins, The Prodigy, Foo Fighters, and Bad Religion. Hilgenstöhler was a guitarist and producer for Son Goku

=== Jochen Hornung ===
Since 1999, Jochen Hornung has been a guitarist in several hardcore bands, most notably "Beat Down". Hornung has also been a columnist for Zap Magazine, a concert presenter and run his own record label. Hornung met Thomas D through his work with Die Fantastischen Vier.

=== Paul J Greco ===
Born in 1966, Paul Greco toured worldwide as part of Chumbawamba from 1992 to 1999. Since 2000, Greco had been doing studio work in Germany with Clueso, Arj Snoek and Klaus Cornfield. Greco was the bassist for Son Goku.

== Discography ==
Crashkurs

Studio album
- Released: 29 July 2002
- Genre: Rock
- Length: 58:00
- Label: Four Music

Professional ratings
Review scores
Source	Rating
laut.de	4/5 stars

=== Crashkurs ===
Crashkurs (Crash course) is Son Goku's first and only studio album. The album took six months to prepare and, of the approximately 16 to 18 songs written, 14 were chosen. The album peaked at number 15 on the Media Control Charts (official German music charts) and 35 on Austrian charts.

Track	Length	German title	English translation
1.	4:43	An alle	To all
2.	3:38	Crashkurs	Crash course
3.	3:52	Gebet dank	Give thanks
4.	2:40	Alle für jeden	Everyone for all
5.	3:47	OM	
6.	4:03	Hier sind wir sind hier	Here are we are here
7.	3:51	Tut mir leid	Sorry
8.	4:31	Ist das dein Leben?	Is this your life?
9.	4:34	Wessen Schicksal	Whose fate
10.	3:51	Sofort aufhören	Stop immediately
11.	4:05	Leicht	Easy
12.	3:35	Läutet alle Glocken	Sound all the bells
13.	2:57	Wann willst du leben wenn nicht jetzt?	When do you want to live, if not now?
14.	7:53	Space	

=== "Alle für jeden" ===
"Alle für jeden" (Everyone for all) is Son Goku's first and only single. The single peaked at number 86 on the Media Control Charts.

Track	Length	German title	English translation
1.	2:41	Alle für jeden (Original Mix)	Everyone for all
2.	3:50	Party für jeden (Hotel Sp. Mix)	Party for all
3.	4:23	Alle für jeden (DJ Friction RMX)	Everyone for all
4.	2:40	Alle für jeden (Instrumental)	Everyone for all

== See also ==
- German hip hop
- Music of Germany
