= Rumble Militia =

German band

Rumble Militia is punk/thrash metal group from Bremen, Germany. Founded in 1985, they notably released two albums and two EPs on Century Media.

== Discography ==
- Fuck Off Commercial (1987, Atom H)
- En Nombre Del Ley EP (1988, Atom H)
- They Give You The Blessing (1990, Century Media)
- Stop Violence And Madness (1991, Century Media)
- Destroy Fascism EP (1991, Century Media)
- Wieviel Hass Wollt Ihr Noch? EP (1993, Century Media)
- Hate Me (1994, FBIS for Gangster Music)
- Set The World On Fire (2020, FBIS for Gangster Music)
