= Axel Hilgenstöhler =

German musician

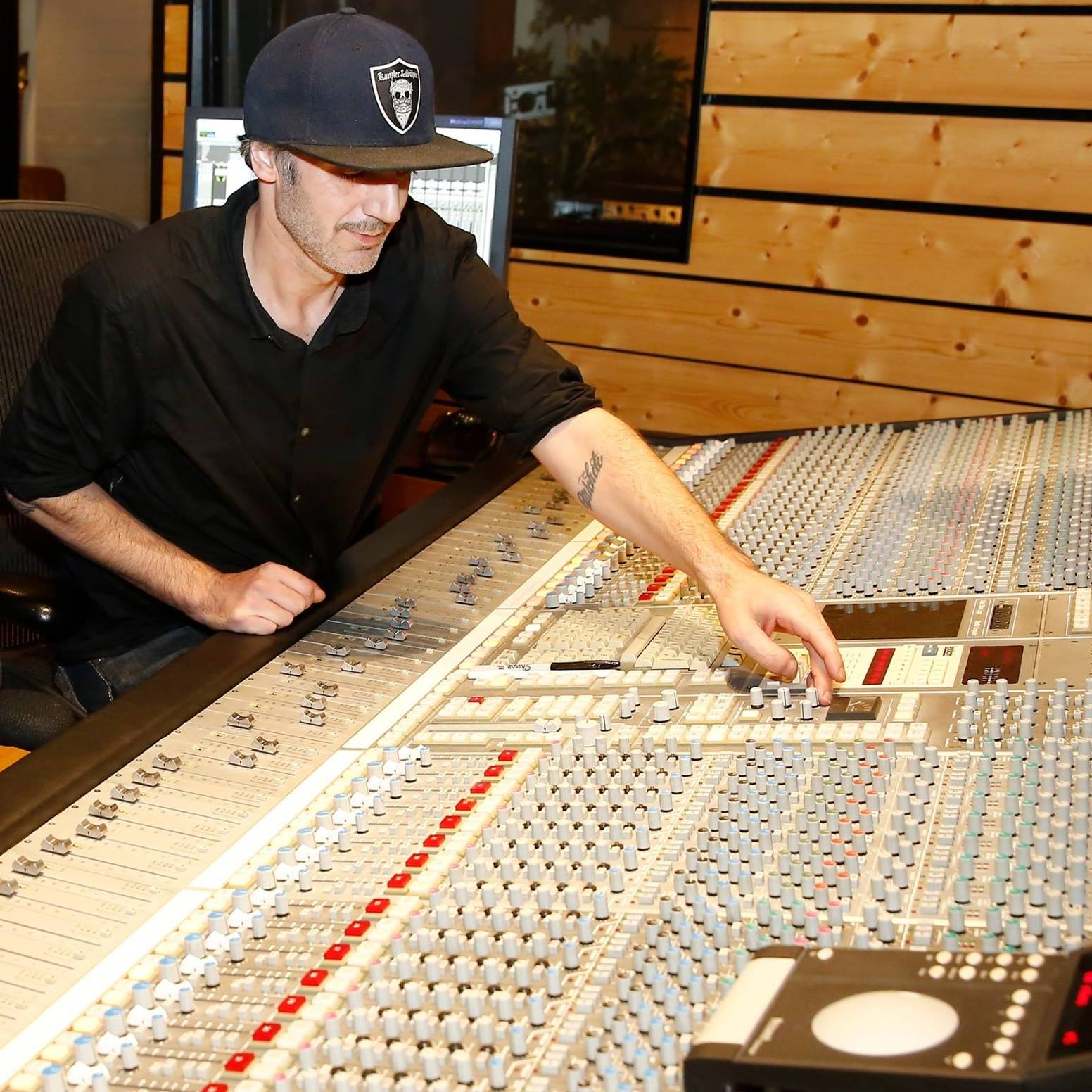
Axel Hilgenstöhler

Axel "Axe" Hilgenstöhler (born August 1975) is a German record producer, mixing engineer and guitarist. He is a founding member of the band Thumb and has played guitar in many bands, including Dog Eat Dog and 50 Cent. In 2003 Afrika Islam and Hilgenstöhler founded the group The Machine.

== Biography ==
Hilgenstöhler received musical education in his childhood. In 1993 he founded, together with Steffen Wilmking (later a member of H-Blockx), the band Thumb.

In 2007 Hilgenstöhler started to play the guitar for Dog Eat Dog.

Hilgenstöhler has worked in different areas of music production, such as musical direction (Das Wunder von Bern), audio engineering and live mixing (Simply Red Farewell Tour) or incubator (Artisto – Revolution – The Anthem at Maidan Nezalezhnosti).

Hilgenstöhler has worked with musicians and producers like Afrika Bambaataa, Flea (Red Hot Chili Peppers), Mastermind (Public Enemy), Chuck D, Kool Keith, D-Rock (Body Count, Vernon Reed (Living Colour) and Ice-T.

Hilgenstöhler was one of the founders of United World Organisation, a charity supporting Ukraine and the Philippines, among other countries.
