= JBO (band) =

German band

J.B.O.
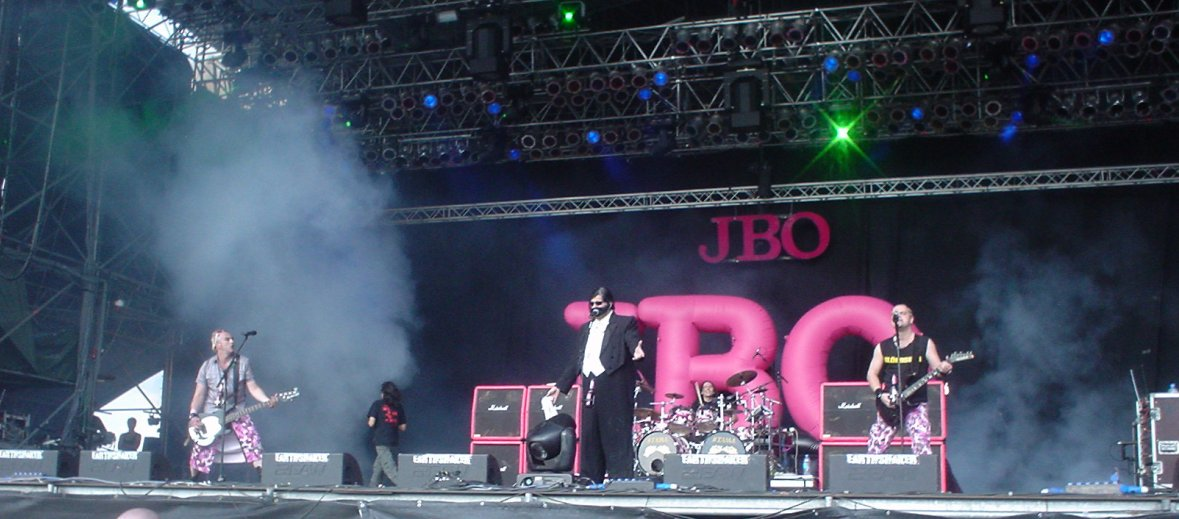
- J.B.O. on the main stage at the 2005 Earthshaker-Festival

Background information
- Origin: Erlangen, Germany
- Genres: Comedy metal, Parody music, Heavy metal
- Years active: 1989–present
- Labels: Megapress
- Members: Hannes "G. Laber" Holzmann; Veit "Vito C." Kutzer; Ralph Bach; Wolfram Kellner
- Past members: Holmer "a Bier" Graap (1989-2000); Schmitti (1989-2000)
- Website: Official website

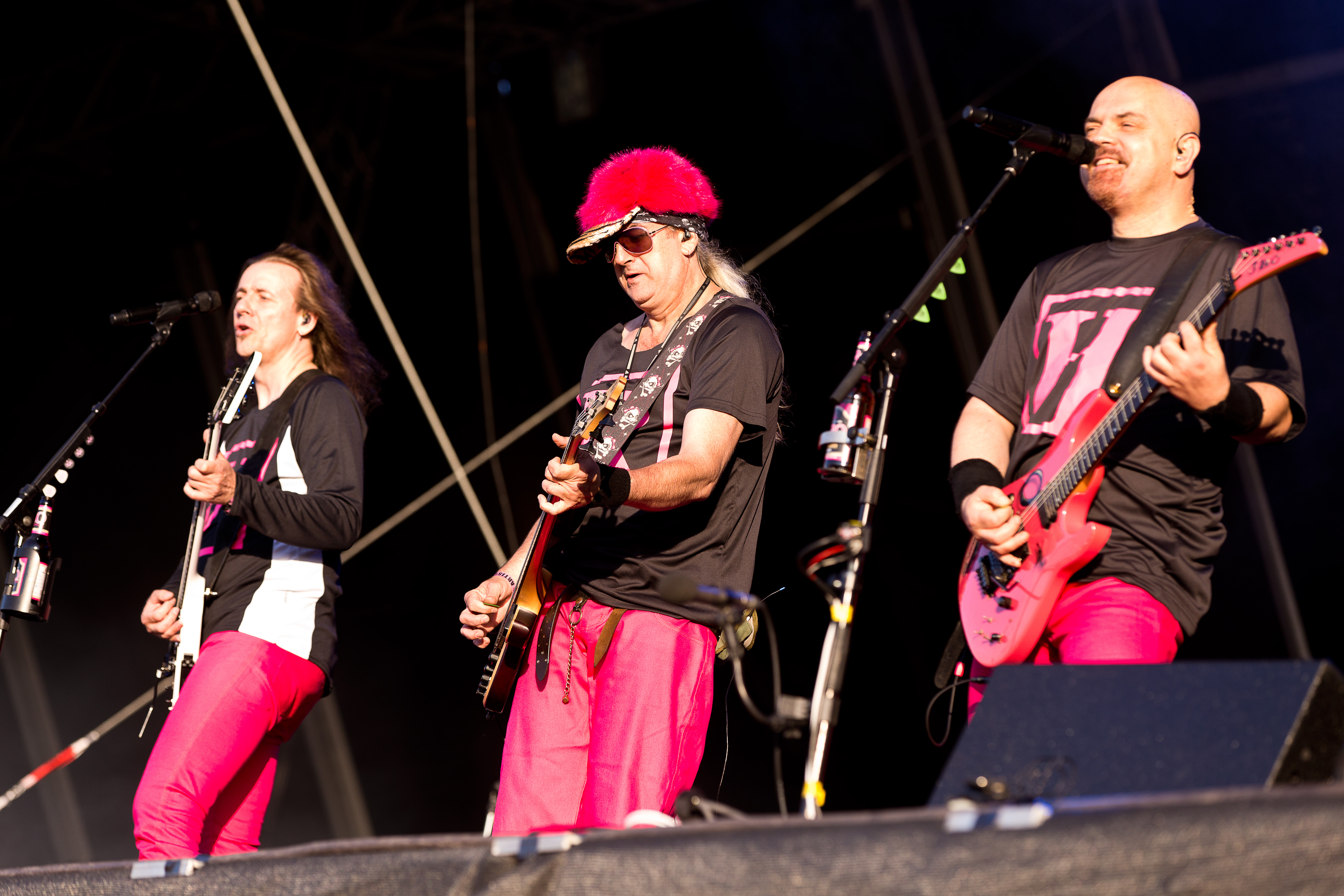
Vito C., Ralph Bach and Hannes Holzmann at the Rockharz Open Air 2016 in Germany

J.B.O. (James Blast Orchester) is a comedy heavy metal band from Erlangen, Germany. J.B.O. was founded in 1989 by Vito C. and Hannes "G.Laber" Holzmann, and is known for parodies of rock and pop songs. The band has written more of its own songs since 2000, but continues to produce parodies, which they refer to as Blöedsinn – an intentional misspelling of "Blödsinn," which means "nonsense" or "stupidity" in German.

The original name was "James Blast Orchester" but they shortened this to J.B.O. in June 1996 after James Last threatened legal action.

The Patrizier brewery of Nuremberg earlier threatened to sue J.B.O. for slander. The band have since changed references to "Patrizier Bräu" in their lyrics to "Pariser Bier" (Parisian beer).

'Schmitti' and Holmer "a Bier" Graap, two of the founder members, left the band in 2000. They were replaced in 2001 by Ralph Bach and Wolfram Kellner. Kellner previously played in Fiddler's Green, which is alluded to in the song "Arschloch und Spaß dabei" ('Asshole and enjoying it'): "man sagt sogar, dass Wolfram früher Folk-Musik g'macht hätt" ("They even say that Wolfram used to play folk music").

The Kitzmann brewery of Erlangen supports the band with gimmick products, and has been featured in the band's lyrics.

The band celebrated its fifteenth birthday on July 31, 2004 with the slogan "30 Halbe!" ("30 halves" = 30 half-litre glasses of beer).

The band still tours today, especially in Germany, Austria, Belgium, Luxembourg, Liechtenstein and Switzerland.

"G. Laber" is a pun as it is pronounced the same as "Gelaber", the German for "drivel" or "twaddle".

== Band members ==
J.B.O. live at Metal Frenzy 2018 in Gardelegen

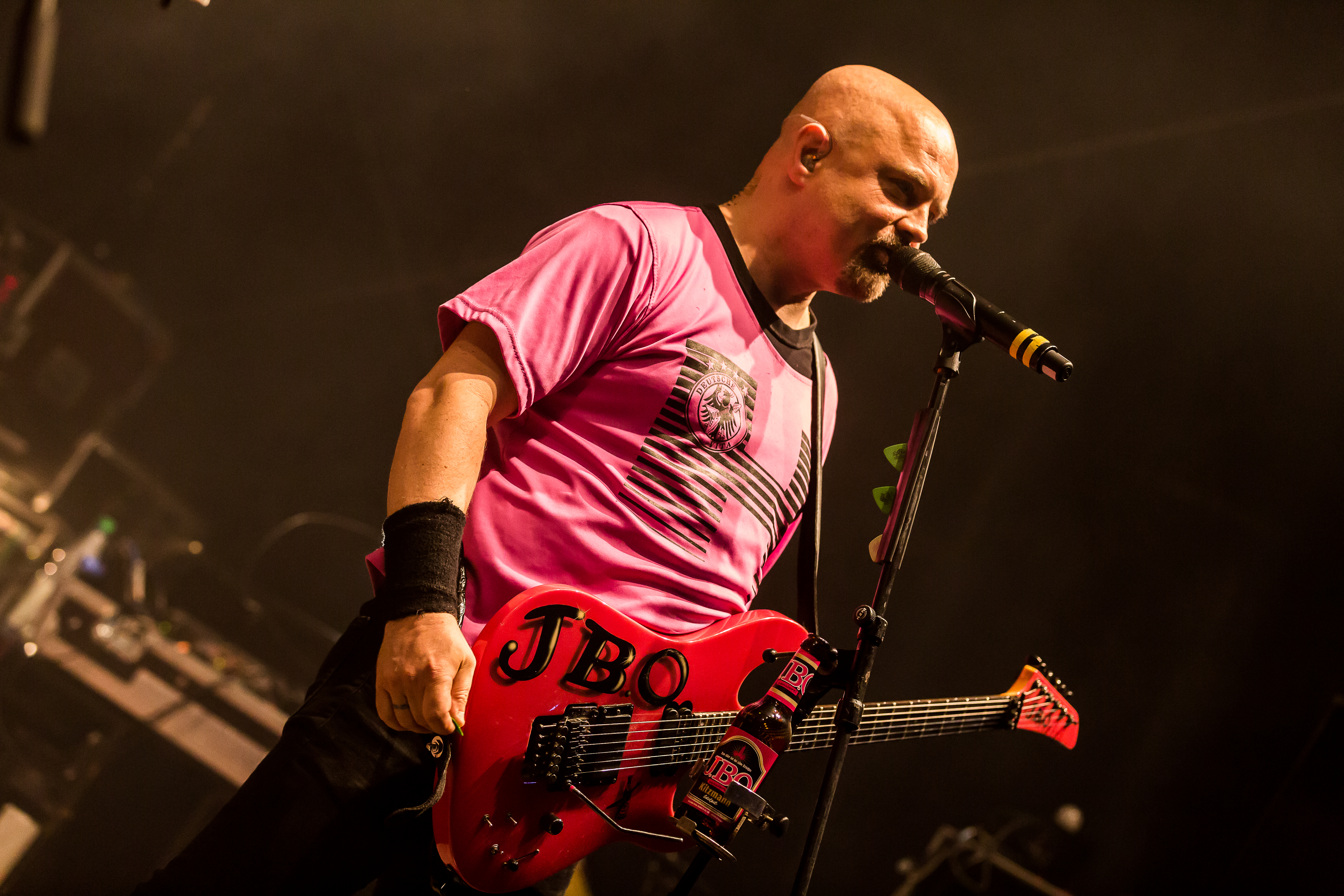
Singer and guitarist Hannes Holzmann

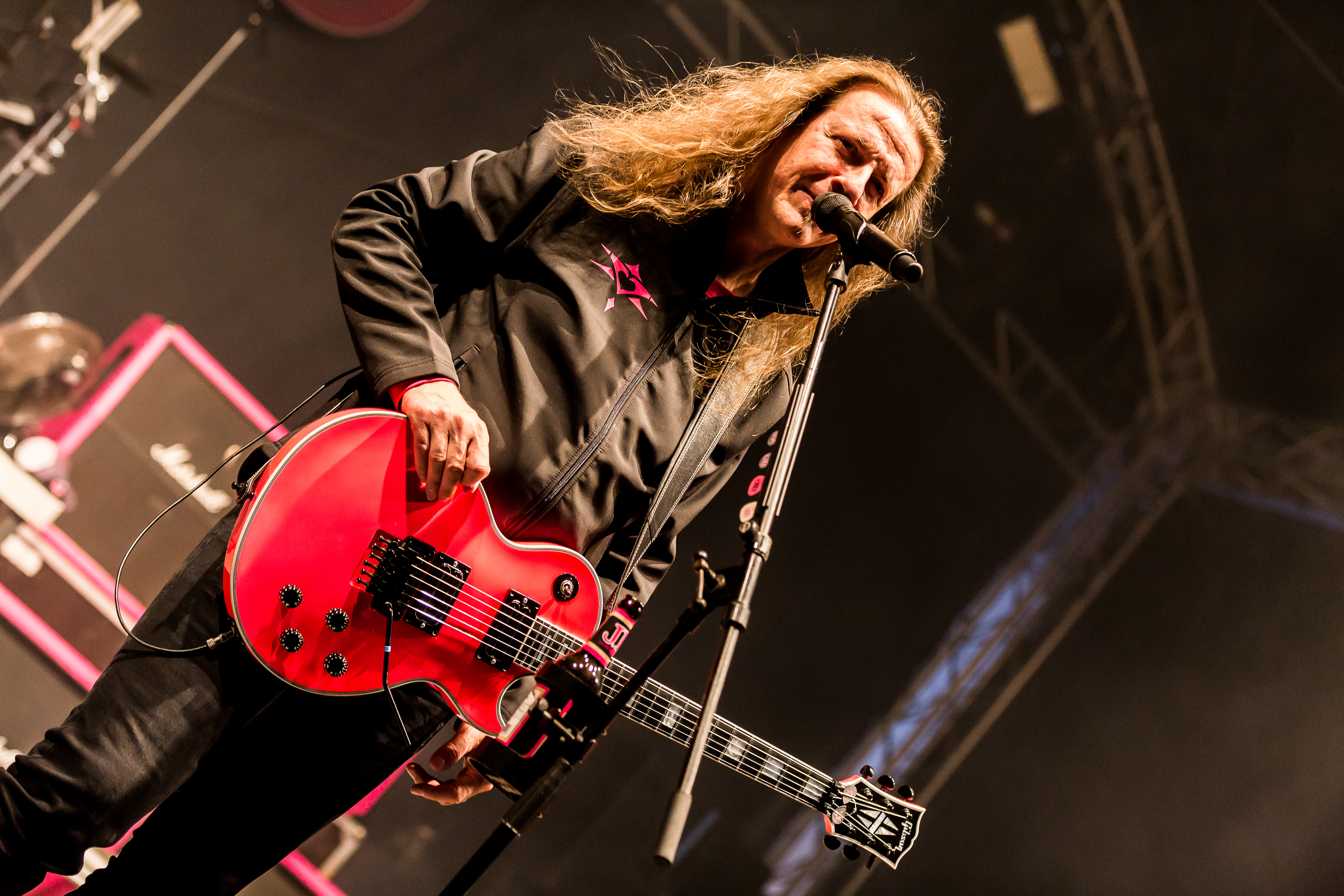
Singer and guitarist Veit Kutzer

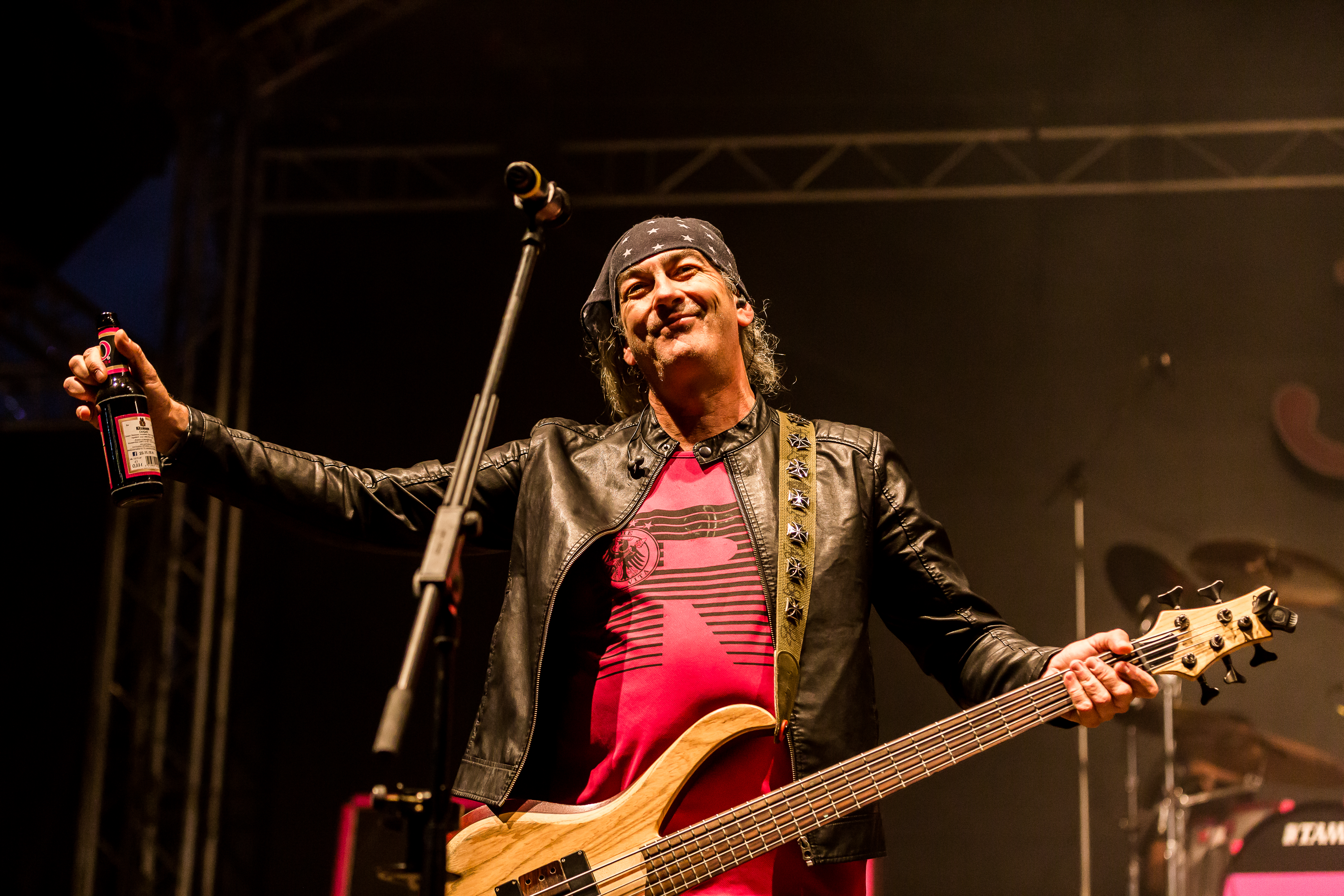
Bassist Ralph Bach

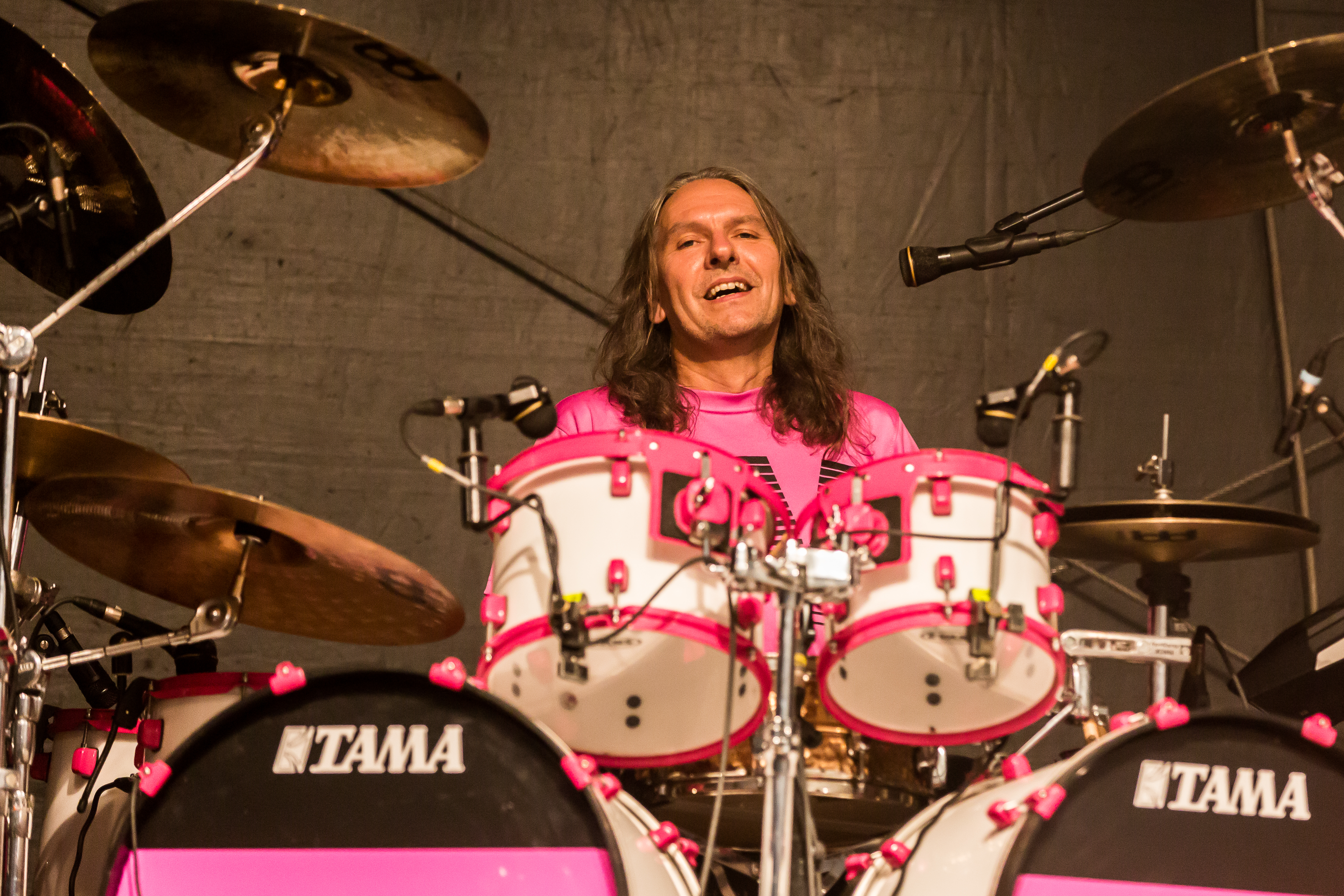
Drummer Wolfram Kellner

=== Guest singers and extra members ===
- Christian Lorenz - Alles Nur Geklaut

== Discography ==
Studio albums

- 1995: Explizite Lyrik (Explicit lyrics, Musical Tragedies/EFA)
- 1997: laut! (loud!, Lawine/BMG)
- 1998: Meister der Musik (Masters of music, Lawine/BMG)
- 2000: Sex Sex Sex (Lawine/Virgin)
- 2002: Rosa Armee Fraktion (Pink Army Faction, a pun on Rote Armee Fraktion [Red Army Faction], Lawine/Virgin)
- 2004: United States of Blöedsinn (United States of Nonsense, Lawine/BMG)
- 2007: Head Bang Boing
- 2009: I Don't Like Metal - I Love It
- 2011: Killeralbum
- 2014: Nur die Besten werden alt
- 2016: 11
- 2018: Deutsche Vita (German vita, a pun on expression Dolce Vita)
- 2019: Wer lässt die Sau raus?!
- 2022: Planet Pink
- 2026: Haus Of The Rising Fun

Other releases

- 1993: Alles Nur Geklaut
- 1994: Eine gute CD zum Kaufen! (A good CD for buying!, Musical Tragedies/EFA)
- 1994: Eine gute CD zum Saufen! (A good CD for drinking!, Musical Tragedies/EFA)
- 1994: BLASTphemie (Musical Tragedies/EFA)
- 1994: BLASTphemie Weihnachts-Edition (Musical Tragedies/EFA)
- 1996: No Business Like Shoebusiness (Doc Martens Records/EFA)
- 1996: Der weiße Hai im Dechsendorfer Weiher (The Great White shark in the Dechsendorfer Weiher, Musical Tragedies/EFA)
- 1996: Die Megra-Hit-Twingle (Musical Tragedies/EFA)
- 1997: Bolle (Lawine/BMG)
- 1997: Wir sind die Champignons (We are the Mushrooms, Lawine/BMG)
- 1998: Ällabätsch (Lawine/BMG)
- 1999: 10 Jahre Blödsinn - Das J.B.O. Home-Video (10 years of nonsense - The J.B.O. home video, Capriola/EFA)
- 2000: Ich sag' J.B.O. (I say J.B.O., Lawine/Virgin)
- 2001: Bums Bums Bums Bums (Lawine/Virgin)
- 2001: Live-Sex (Lawine/Virgin)
- 2002: Ich will Lärm! (I want noise!, Lawine/Virgin)
- 2004: Gänseblümchen (Daisy, Lawine/BMG)
- 2005: Eine gute BLASTphemie zum Kaufen! (A good blastphemy to buy!, Musical Tragedies/EFA)
- 2005: TV Blöedsinn - DVD (TV nonsense, also a pun on German TV magazine TV Spielfilm, Lawine/SonyBMG)
- 2005: J.B.O. für Anfänger (J.B.O. for beginners, Best of-Compilation, Lawine/SonyBMG)
- 2006: Rock Muzik
- 2010: 2000 Jahre J.B.O.
- 2011: Happy Metal Thunder
- 2013: S.P.O.R.T
