= Boiled Kilt =

German metal band

- Origin: Leipzig, Saxony, Germany
- Genres: Heavy metal, death metal, nu metal
- Years active: July 1995–2001
- Members: Stefan Waldek (vocals); Tobias Hellmann (percussion); Marcel Wiebach; Marco Meckert
- Past members: Thomas Rudolf (1995–1996; rhythm guitar); Mario Arnold (1995–1996; bass guitar); Friedrich Pohl (1996; bass guitar); Falk Johne (1995–1999; lead guitar)

Boiled Kilt is a German metal band, which was founded in 1995 in Leipzig. The music group belonged to the most successful rock bands of the German region Saxony. Boiled Kilt accompanied as support Think About Mutation in 1996 on their tour (D, CZ, A, CH and L) and as support too Sepultura in 2001 on their Germany tour. They split off in the year 2003.

== History ==
On 16 September 1995 lead guitar player Falk, drummer Tobias Hellmann and frontshouter Stefan decided the foundation of Boiled Kilt. At that time Falk and Tobias already played together in the music group Fast Jam. Stefan, a school friend of Falk, complemented they both. About stage contacts Mario "Arnie" Arnold bumped as bass guitar player there. Falks school friend Thomas 'Rudi' Rudolf complemented BK. The first tests took place from summer, 1995 in Leipzig-Grünau in their rehearsal. Very quickly the titles of the debut album Broken Identity were recorded in December 1995.

The first common appearances with Think About Mutation as took place in November and December 1995 in Berlin (Knaack club) and in Dresden (Scheune). From March to May 1996 Boiled Kilt joined in as a Support beside the Swiss music group Swamp Terrorists the complete 'Hellraver'tour from Think About Mutation. In the following time had BK a lot of live appearances.

1997 till 2003 they played near 200 concerts with music groups like Die Krupps, Pro-Pain, Wipeout and in 2001 a complete Tour across Germany as support for Sepultura. In 1998 they signed a deal by Syndicate/EMI Publishing, but they got no labeldeal. In 2003 Boiled Kilt split off. Side-projects and following projects named LOOM, The Butlers, Crowd and Sympathy for the devil.

== Discography ==
- 1996: Broken Identity
- 1998: Boiled Kilt
- 1999: Stay Blind. Session One E.P.
- 2000: Not 4 sale

== Press ==
- Schmidt, Lars: Boiled Kilt lassenden Bastard im Schottenrock beim "Großen Preis" los. Frustverarbeitung ohne Kompromisse, in: Leipziger Volkszeitung, 4 December 1996.
- Rietschel, Andreas: Boiled Kilt. Die neuen Helden? Auf dem Weg zum Durchbruch, in: das Teil, Vol. 2, Issue 24 (Dec.), Leipzig 1997, pp. 6–9, 36–37.
- Senier, Katja: Lehrwochen einer Leipziger Band: 'Boiled Kilt' tourten durch Österreich, Deutschland und die Schweiz. Mit Schottenrock und Dosenbier in die große Welt, in: Leipziger Volkszeitung, Vol. 104, No. 6, 8 January 1998.
- Rezension from Jörg Augsburg: Boiled Kilt Session One, in: KREUZER, Issue 7, Leipzig 1998, p. 67.
- Rezension from Peter Matzke: Boiled Kilt, in: BLITZ Leipzig, Vol. 9, Issue 7/8, 15 July 1998.
- Zschelletzschky, Henry: Leipziger Bands. Boiled Kilt, in: Zeitpunkt, (Sept.), Leipzig 1998, S. 19.
- Boiled Kilt oder das triebhafte Verlangen, live auf der Bühne zu stehen, in: ((tam))zine, No. 3 (Dez.), Leipzig 1998, p. 18-19.
- Wittpenn, Markus: Painful Silence, Deep Inside, Boiled Kilt und Loom auf Danger-Of-Noize-Tour. Aus der kleinen Tonne in die weite Welt, in: Leipziger Volkszeitung 17 April 2001, p. 18.
