= Such a Surge =

German rap rock band

Such A Surge
- Origin: Braunschweig, Germany
- Genres: Rap rock, alternative rock, alternative hip hop
- Years active: 1992–2006
- Labels: Rap Nation Records, Sony Music Entertainment/ Epic Records, Nuclear Blast
- Past members: Oliver Schneider; Michel Begeame; Lutz Buch; Axel Horn; Carsten "Antek" Rudo; Dennis Graef; Daniel Laudahn; DJ Royal T Rock DJ HandTrix
- Website: suchasurge.de

Such a Surge was a German alternative/rap rock band. The band was formed in Braunschweig, Lower Saxony in 1992 and broke up in 2006.

== Band members ==
=== Last line-up ===
- Oliver Schneider – vocals
- Michel Begeame – vocals
- Lutz Buch – guitars
- Axel Horn – bass
- Carsten "Antek" Rudo – drums

=== Former members ===
- Dennis Graef – guitars
- Daniel Laudahn – drums
- DJ Royal T – DJ
- Rock DJ HandTrix - DJ

== Discography ==
=== Studio albums ===
Year	Title	Chart positions	
Year	Title	Germany	Austria
1995	Under Pressure	42	-
1996	Agoraphobic Notes	25	42
1998	Was Besonderes	36	36
2000	Der Surge Effekt	15	35
2003	Rotlicht	31	-
2005	Alpha	71	-

=== Compilation albums ===
Year	Title	Chart positions	
Year	Title	Germany	Austria
2002	10 Jahre	62	-

=== Singles and EPs ===
Year	Title	Chart positions
Year	Title	Germany
1993	Against the Stream / Gegen den Strom	-
1995	I'm Real	-
1995	Schatten	-
1995	Ich bin ein Träumer (feat. Jazzkantine)	-
1996	Ideale?!	-
1996	Ich sehe dich	-
1998	Jetzt ist gut	68
1998	Nie mehr Lovesongs / Koma	-
1999	Tropfen	45
2000	Chaos (feat. Ferris MC, Spezializtz & DJ Stylewarz)	68
2000	Silver Surger	-
2000	Gib mir mehr	-
2002	Koma 2002	-
2003	Fremdkörper / Alles muss raus	-
2003	Hypochonder	-
2005	Mission erfüllt	69
