= Discipline (band) =

American band

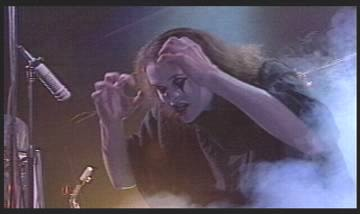
- Discipline performing live in 1995

Background information
- Origin: Detroit, Michigan, United States
- Genre: Progressive rock
- Years active: 1987–present
- Members: Matthew Parmenter; Chris Herin; Mathew Kennedy; Henry Parmenter
- Past members: Brad Buszard; Dave Krofchok; Woody Saunders; Don Bakerian; Jon Preston Bouda; Paul Dzendel

Discipline (styled as Discipline.) is an American progressive rock band formed in 1987 by singer-songwriter Matthew Parmenter. Based in Detroit, Michigan the band has released six studio albums, three live albums, a live DVD, and a live concert motion picture. Discipline may be best known for their 1997 release Unfolded Like Staircase.

== History ==
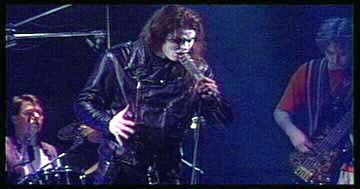
Discipline performing live in 1995

Discipline was formed in 1987, adopting its name from an influential King Crimson album. The band have released multiple studio albums and appeared at several progressive rock festivals, including Nearfest, RoSfest, ProgScape, the Orion Studios progressive rock showcase, Summers End, Terra incognita, Veruno Prog Festival and six appearances at ProgDay. In addition, the band did a 1993 tour in Norway to support their first studio recording Push & Profit. The tour was organized by students of the Norwegian University of Life Sciences in Ås, Norway near Oslo. The band is best known for its 1997 album Unfolded Like Staircase.

The band has remained independent since its inception. In 1995 Discipline was approached by the American progressive rock label Magna Carta Records and its European distribution partner Roadrunner Records (originally of the Netherlands). Although an early version of the band's epic "Canto IV (Limbo)" appeared on a Magna Carta sampler in 1995, the label deal fell apart due to artistic differences. Later Discipline signed a European distribution deal with Hungary's Periferic Records. In 2010 England's Cyclops/GFT label released "Discipline. Live Days," a double CD compilation pulled from several live concert recordings.

In 2011 the band released To Shatter All Accord, their first studio album in fourteen years. Subsequently, in 2012, the band was featured on the cover of the Italian magazine Wonderous Stories and French magazine Koid 9. In 2013, after twenty-five years, the band reissued their first album Chaos Out of Order, originally released on cassette tape in 1988. In January 2014, the band released a double CD, This One's for England, recorded live in Gettysburg, Pennsylvania during their appearance at RoSfest in 2012.

In 2015 Discipline performed at UK's Summers End music festival. Discipline performed at Italy's 2Days Prog+1 festival on September 2, 2017, billed as “the most important Prog Rock festival in Italy.” The band also played October 22, 2017, at Chicago's 3-day Progtoberfest. Discipline headlined the FestivAlterNativo music festival in Querétaro, Mexico August 25, 2018.

== Style ==
Discipline's style and genre has been variously described. The Detroit News described them as an "alternative band." However, the progressive rock website Prog Archives classifies Discipline as "Symphonic Prog". Doug Levy in Detroit's South End newspaper writes of Discipline, "this is not some kind of over-the-top theatrical rock troupe of sorts as much as it is a welcome merging of both art and tightly-knit (hence the name) modern rock." John Collinge, publisher of Progression Magazine, writes, "Discipline’s music demands focused attention—preferably with headphones and lyric booklet, at least on the first spin. Once you’ve locked into Parmenter’s vibe, strong melodies and gloriously edgy accompaniment seal the deal." Discipline is a registered trademark of Strung Out Records.

== Members ==
Current lineup

- Matthew Parmenter (1987–present) – vocals, keyboards, violin, saxophone, guitars
- Mathew Kennedy (1988–present) – bass guitar
- Chris Herin (2014–present) – lead guitar
- Henry Parmenter (2025-present) - drums

Former members

- Jon Preston Bouda (1987–2014) – lead guitar
- Paul Dzendzel (1991–2024) – drums
- Don Bakerian (1987) – backing guitar
- Woody Saunders (1987–1991) – drums
- Dave Krofchok (1991–1993) – keyboards
- Brad Buszard (1993–1995) – keyboards

== Discography ==
- Chaos Out of Order (1988)
- Push & Profit (1993)
- Discipline Live 1995 (VHS 1995)
- Unfolded Like Staircase (1997)
- Discipline. Live into the Dream... (1999)
- Discipline Live 1995 (DVD reissue 2005)
- Live Days (2010)
- To Shatter All Accord (2011)
- Chaos Out of Order – 25th anniversary reissue (2013)
- This One's for England (2014)
- Discipline Live in Gettysburg (motion picture 2015)
- Captives of the Wine Dark Sea (2017)
- Breadcrumbs (2025)

== See also ==
- NEARfest
- RoSfest
