= Mambo Kurt =

German entertainer

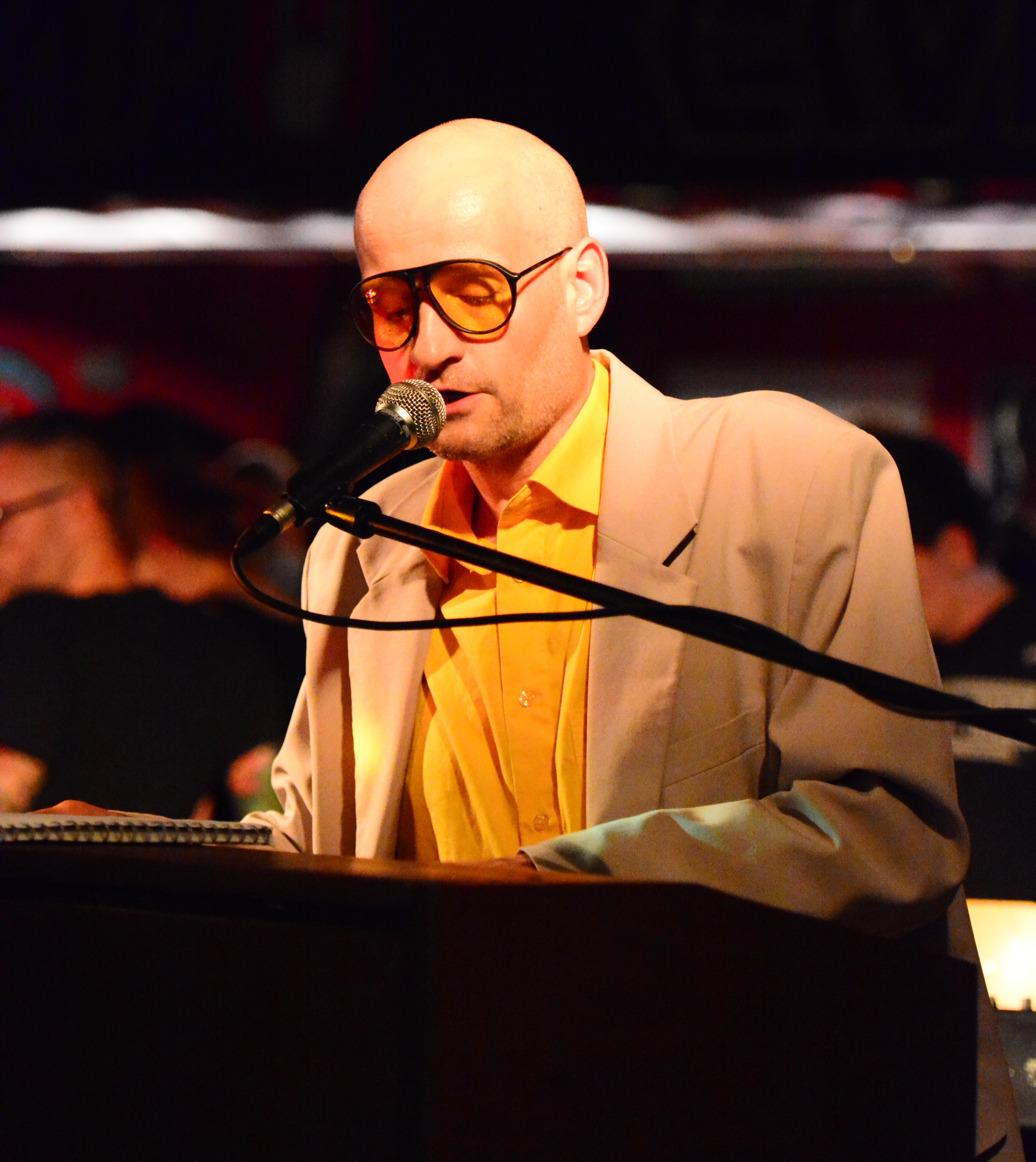
Mambo Kurt at Hamburg Metal Dayz 2014

Mambo Kurt (born Rainer Limpinsel; 11 April 1967 in Hagen) is a German comedy and novelty act who performs covers of mainstream and classic rock hits.

Mambo has performed at the Wacken Open Air festival and provides music for a German television show called Veronas Welt. Mambo Kurt performs on a home organ and changes the style of songs to bossa nova, samba or polka. He has also recruited his elderly home-organ teacher, Heidi Schulz, to sing covers of the Sex Pistols' "Anarchy in the UK" and the Rolling Stones' "Sympathy for the Devil" on his live album Sun of a Beach.

Despite not being known worldwide, Mambo Kurt has gained a large fanbase, most notably the bands Clawfinger and Rammstein, and has appeared repeatedly on television.

Since Mambo Kurt has a degree in medicine, he is a licensed doctor and thus helped as a vaccinator in 2021 during the Corona crisis.

== Discography ==
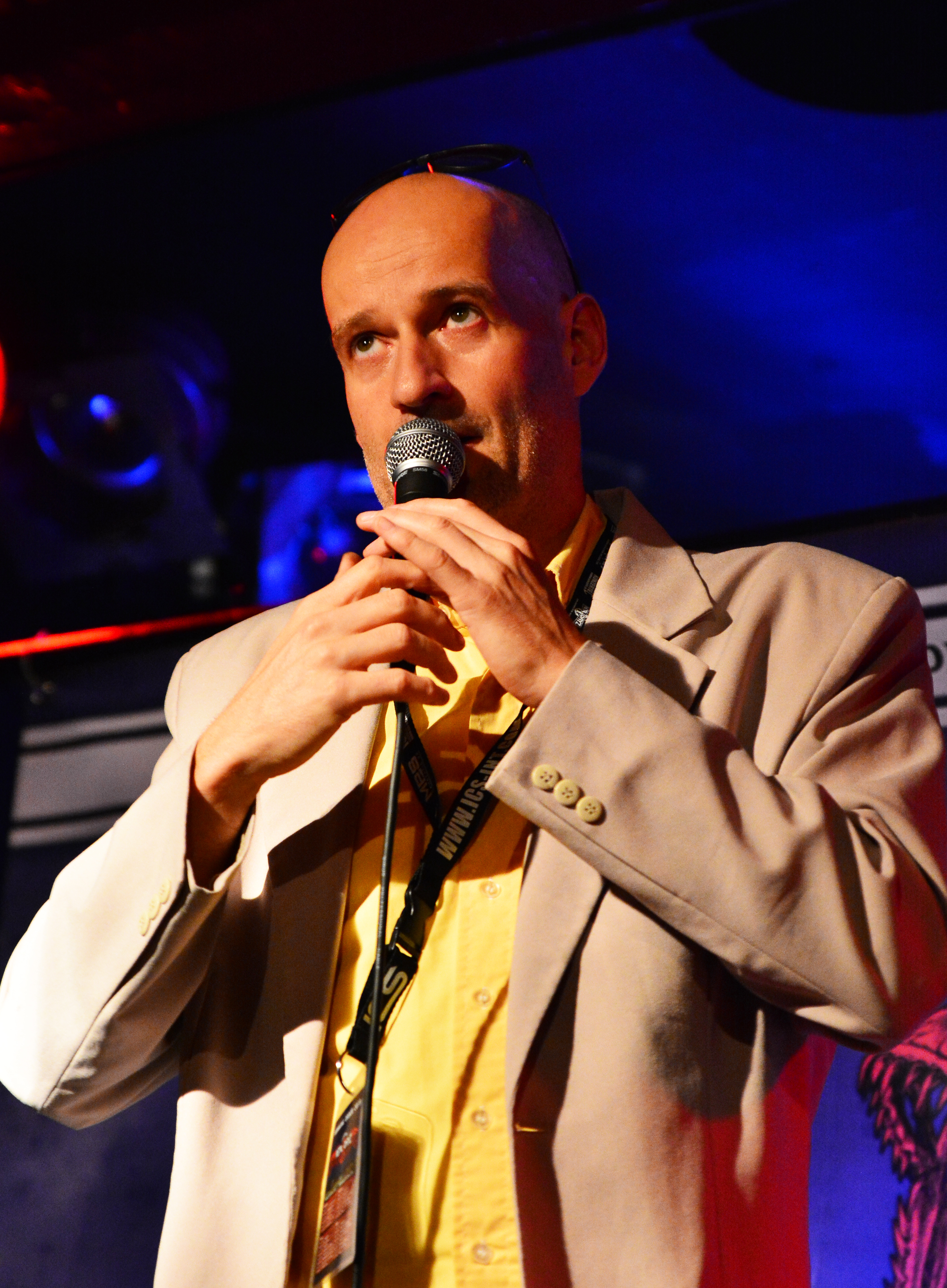
Mambo Kurt performing in 2015

=== Albums ===
- Weihnachten (2014, Metalville, 14 Tracks)
- Spiel Heimorgel, spiel (2007)
- Organized Crime (2005)
- Sun of a Beach – The Return of Alleinunterhalter vol. 5 (2004)
- Ekstase – The Return of Alleinunterhalter vol. 4 (2002)
- Back in Beige – The Return of Alleinunterhalter vol. II (2002)
- The Return of Alleinunterhalter (1999, Virgin Music, 15 Tracks)
- The Return of Alleinunterhalter (1998, Stamm & Belz Records, 19 Tracks)
- Lieder zur Weihnachtszeit (not available anymore) (1998)

== See also ==
- Eläkeläiset
