= One Fine Day (band) =

German rock band

One Fine Day is a German rock band from Hamburg, Germany. The band has charted at the national charts once.

== Band members ==
- Hendrik - Guitars
- Marten - Vocals
- Marco - Bass
- Erik - Drums

== Former band members ==
- Roman - Guitars
