= Thumb (band) =

German alternative metal bend (1993-2005)

- Origin: Gütersloh, Germany
- Genres: Alternative metal, nu metal
- Years active: 1993–2005
- Labels: Spin Records (a sub-label of EMI Electrola), Victory
- Past members: Axel Pralat; Jens Gössling; Steffen Wilmking; Jan-Hendrik Meyer; Claus Grabke; Axel Hilgenstöhler
- Website: thumbpage.de

Thumb was a German alternative metal/nu metal band formed in Gütersloh in 1993. The group disbanded in 2005.

== History ==
The band recorded and copied their first home-made tapes in 1994, and signed with EMI Electrola in March 1995. Their debut album, Thumb, was released in September 1995, and over the next two years they toured in Germany with Bad Religion, Dog Eat Dog, Henry Rollins and Foo Fighters. In January 1997 the group began writing their second album, Exposure, released on 5 May.

Thumb also toured in the United States, joining the 1998 Vans Warped Tour to play 13 shows in three weeks. During preparations for their third album in early 2000, guitarist Axel Hilgenstöhler left the band halfway through the year, and was replaced by Axel Pralat. Everything written and recorded up to that point was discarded.

Thumb disbanded in 2005. After the split, Steffen Wilmking joined H-Blockx, Jens Gössling is in Taetowier Studio, Jan-Hendrik Meyer is in Hudson, Claus Grabke is in Alternative Allstars, and Axel Pralat is in Waterdown.

== Members ==
- Axel Pralat – guitar (2000–2005)
- Jens Gössling – DJ (1994–2005)
- Steffen Wilmking – drums (1994–2005)
- Jan-Hendrik Meyer – bass (1994–2005)
- Claus Grabke – vocals (1994–2005)
- Axel Hilgenstöhler – guitar (1994–2000)

== Discography ==
=== Albums ===
- Thumb
  - Released: 1995 (Netherlands) on Spin Records
  - Track listing:
    All tracks are written by Thumb.
    | No. | Title | Length |
    |---|---|---|
    | 1. | "Haunted" | 4:12 |
    | 2. | "Victim of Your Lies" | 3:33 |
    | 3. | "Red Alert" | 4:14 |
    | 4. | "Fascism Sucks" | 3:24 |
    | 5. | "No More Blood (Intro)" | 1:31 |
    | 6. | "No More Blood" | 3:55 |
    | 7. | "Fed Up" | 3:15 |
    | 8. | "Skindeep" | 3:25 |
    | 9. | "Deny" | 4:00 |
    | 10. | "Consumer's Rap-Sody" | 4:19 |
    | 11. | "It Ain't What You See" | 4:09 |
    | 12. | "Boredom" | 3:21 |
    | 13. | "(All the Way) Down" | 4:16 |
    | Total length: | | 47:34 |
- Thumb (Encore)
  - Released: 25 July 1996 (Germany) on Spin Records
  - Track listing:
    All tracks are written by Thumb.
    | No. | Title | Lyrics | Length |
    |---|---|---|---|
    | 1. | "Red Alert '96" (Previously Unreleased) | | 3:14 |
    | 2. | "Aside" (Previously Unreleased) | Lyrics: Claus Grabke | 3:14 |
    | 3. | "Haunted" | | 4:12 |
    | 4. | "Victim of Your Lies" | | 3:33 |
    | 5. | "Red Alert" | | 4:14 |
    | 6. | "Fascism Sucks" | | 3:24 |
    | 7. | "No More Blood (Intro)" | | 1:31 |
    | 8. | "No More Blood" | | 3:55 |
    | 9. | "Fed Up" | | 3:15 |
    | 10. | "Skindeep" | | 3:25 |
    | 11. | "Deny" | | 4:00 |
    | 12. | "Consumer's Rap-Sody" | | 4:19 |
    | 13. | "It Ain't What You See" | | 4:09 |
    | 14. | "Boredom" | | 3:21 |
    | 15. | "(All the Way) Down" | | 4:16 |
    | 16. | "I Don't Wanna Hear It" (Previously Unreleased) | | 2:06 |
    | 17. | "Victim Of Your Lies" (Live) | | 3:38 |
    | 18. | "It Ain't What You See" (Live) | | 3:59 |
    | 19. | "Skindeep" (Live) | | 3:34 |
    | 20. | "Fascism Sucks" (Live) | | 3:32 |
    | 21. | "Haunted" (Live) | | 4:41 |
- Exposure
  - Released: 1 April 1997 (Netherlands, UK, Germany) on Spin Records
  - Released: 23 June 1998 (USA) on Victory Records
  - Track listing:
    All tracks are written by Thumb.
    | No. | Title | Length |
    |---|---|---|
    | 1. | "Break Me" | 3:11 |
    | 2. | "Sell Myself" | 2:51 |
    | 3. | "Seize the Day" | 2:48 |
    | 4. | "Values" | 3:16 |
    | 5. | "Thank You for Hating Me" | 3:11 |
    | 6. | "Remember" | 4:31 |
    | 7. | "Dad" | 3:30 |
    | 8. | "Reality" | 3:18 |
    | 9. | "This Life" | 3:15 |
    | 10. | "Exposure" | 2:57 |
    | 11. | "Cavemen in Disguise" (includes hidden track "Aside" (5:59)) | 10:48 |
- Maximum Exposure
  - Released: 28 November 1997 on Spin Records
  - Track listing:
    All tracks are written by Thumb.
    | No. | Title | Length |
    |---|---|---|
    | 1. | "Break Me" | 3:11 |
    | 2. | "Sell Myself" | 2:51 |
    | 3. | "Seize the Day" | 2:48 |
    | 4. | "Values" | 3:16 |
    | 5. | "Thank You for Hating Me" | 3:11 |
    | 6. | "Remember" | 4:31 |
    | 7. | "Dad" | 3:30 |
    | 8. | "Reality" | 3:18 |
    | 9. | "This Life" | 3:15 |
    | 10. | "Exposure" | 2:57 |
    | 11. | "Cavemen in Disguise" | 4:02 |
    | 12. | "Die Welt Ist Eins" (Featuring Thomas D.) | 4:12 |
    | 13. | "Sell Myself" (Live at 'Rock Am Ring') | 3:01 |
    | 14. | "Values" (Live at 'Rockpalast' (Cologne)) | 3:33 |
    | 15. | "Cavemen In Disguise" (Live at 'Colosseum' (Munich) Support Rollins Tour '97) | 4:40 |
    | 16. | "Dad" (Live at 'Colosseum' (Munich) Support Rollins Tour '97) | 3:30 |
    | 17. | "Red Alert" (Live at 'Roskilde Festival '97') | 3:36 |
    | 18. | "Exposure" (Live at 'Roskilde Festival '97') | 3:20 |
    | 19. | "Thank You For Hating Me" (Live at 'Roskilde Festival '97') | 4:20 |
    | 20. | "No More Blood" (Live at 'Roskilde Festival '97') | 8:02 |
- 3 (Three)
  - Released: 2001 (USA) on Victory Records
  - Released: 10 July 2001 (Germany) on EMI Electrola
  - Track listing:
    All tracks are written by Thumb.
    | No. | Title | Length |
    |---|---|---|
    | 1. | "Upside & Down" | 3:12 |
    | 2. | "Down Like Me" | 2.37 |
    | 3. | "Stupid" | 4:09 |
    | 4. | "Lie to You" | 3:54 |
    | 5. | "Youth" | 3:26 |
    | 6. | "Thumbtune" | 0:57 |
    | 7. | "Break My Back" | 3:15 |
    | 8. | "Fade Away" | 3:38 |
    | 9. | "Migraine" | 3:12 |
    | 10. | "Suck Me Dry" | 3:35 |
    | 11. | "Shortly" | 3:07 |
    | 12. | "More" | 3:51 |
    | 13. | "Confidence" | 3:13 |

=== Singles ===
- "Red Alert" (1995)
- "No More Blood" (1996)
- "Red Alert '96" (1996)
- "Aside" (1996)
- "Sell Myself" (1997)
- "Seize The Day" (1997)
- "Break Me" (1998)
- "Down Like Me" (2001)
- "Youth" (2001)
