= DDR von unten =

East German punk rock album released in 1983

- LP record

Studio album by Zwitschermaschine/Schleim-Keim
- Released: 1983
- Recorded: January 1983
- Studio: Home studio of Andeck Baumgärtel, Hermsdorf near Dresden
- Genre: Art punk/Punk rock
- Length: 26:32
- Language: German
- Label: Aggressive Rockproduktionen (AGR)
- Producer: Sören "Egon" Naumann
- Zwitschermaschine (5 tracks): Vocals: Cornelia Schleime, Michael Rom, Sascha Anderson; Guitar: Lothar Fiedler, Ralf Kerbach; Bass: Matthias Zeidler; Trombone/violin: Volker Palma; Drums: Wolfgang Grossmann; Schleim-Keim (7 tracks): Vocals/Drums: Dieter "Otze" Ehrlich; V: Klaus Ehrlich; Bass: Andreas Deubach

DDR von unten (sometimes called eNDe or DDR von unten/eNDe; English: GDR from below) was a split LP by two East German punk bands, Zwitschermaschine and Schleim-Keim. The album was smuggled from the GDR to West Berlin. Released in 1983 by the independent label Aggressive Rockproduktionen, it is considered the first punk album in the GDR, but was only officially released in the West. For years it was the only release of its kind. The production of the album kept the Ministry for State Security busy for several years, with the band Schleim-Keim almost exclusively targeted for repression. Two unofficial collaborators (IM) were involved in its creation, including the then highly regarded alternative writer Sascha Anderson.

== History of its creation ==
Dimitri Hegemann, from the West Berlin city magazine tip, met the band Rosa Extra at an East Berlin party in 1982. He was surprised to discover a counterculture in the GDR and this inspired him to produce records in the West. Hegemann visited Karl-Ulrich Walterbach from Aggressive Rockproduktionen and successfully convinced him of the idea. As Hegemann had an entry permit to East Berlin, he was able to follow the process of creating the album. However, since Rosa Extra could not complete the project independently and required assistance, they approached Sascha Anderson. As a freelance writer, he had many connections in intellectual and artistic circles critical of the GDR regime. His own band, Zwitschermaschine, eventually became the second group to participate in the album, which was now planned as a split release. Sascha Anderson wrote an essay reflecting the zeitgeist of the GDR underground and his group. The essay was later published in the inlay. Sören "Egon" Naumann, the driver and technician familiar with recording techniques, was included in the plan and agreed to produce the songs. They decided to hire another band as well, and contacts were made with Dieter "Otze" Ehrlich from Schleim-Keim. In contrast to Zwitschermaschine and Rosa Extra, this angry and aggressive band would complement the more artistic style of the two bands.

In early 1983, Anderson discovered a home studio in Hermsdorf near Dresden where the songs could be recorded. The studio was set up by Andeck Baumgärtel, a blues musician with the group Mustang, on the ground floor of his home, and was equipped with a drum kit from the Czech brand Amati. However, the studio technology was not optimal or up to date. In particular, the mixing console from Vermona was faulty and the plastic microphones used to record the drums often failed. The RFT vocal microphone was the only up-to-date equipment used for the recordings. The recordings were made using magnetic tapes from ORWO on Tesla tape machines over a weekend in January 1983.

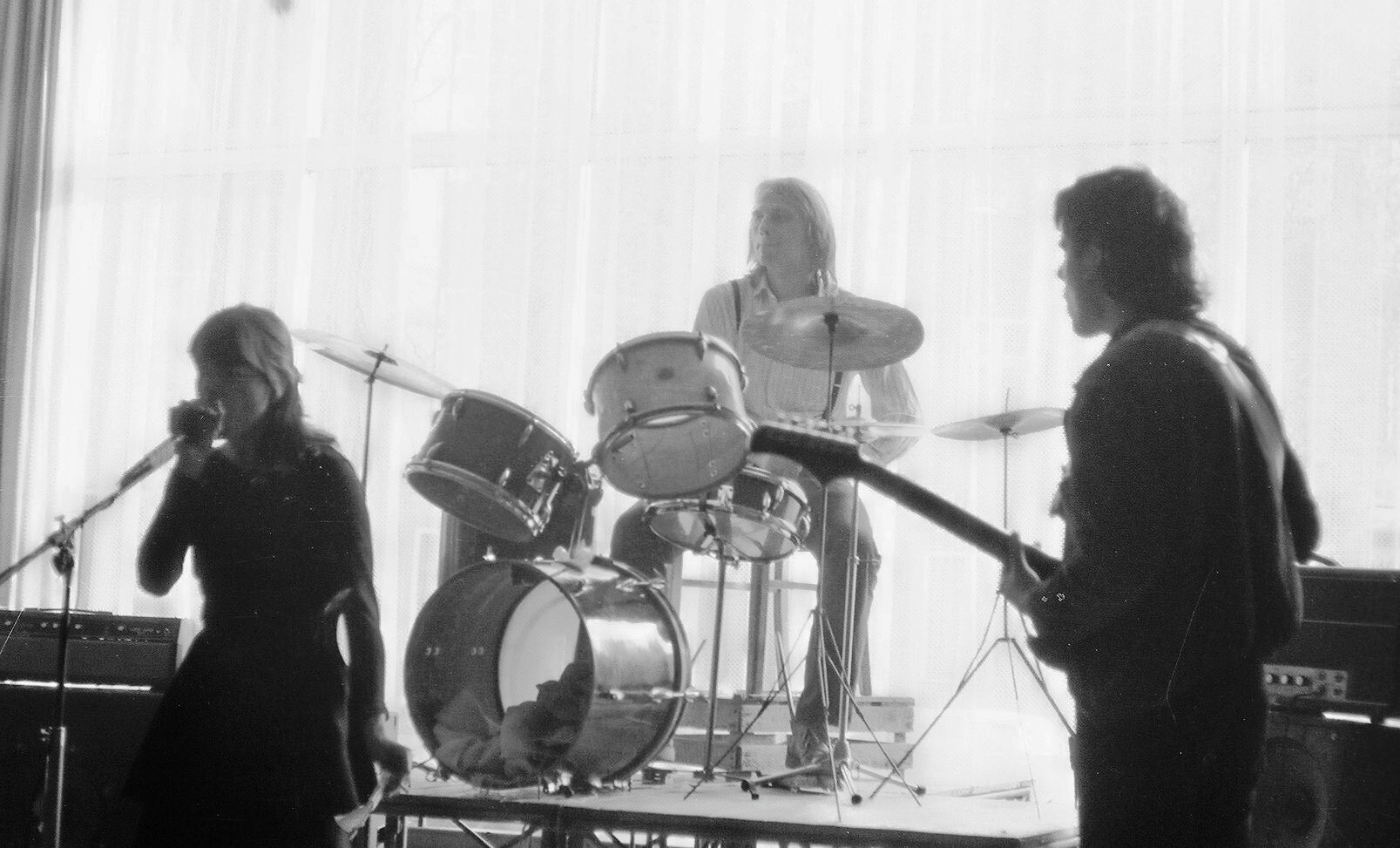
Zwitschermaschine: Cornelia Schleime, Ralf Kerbach and Wolfgang Grossmann

The initial recording session featured Rosa Extra, who brought a genuine Casio synthesiser - a rarity in the GDR at the time. The entire rehearsal was recorded and archived for later use. The following day, Schleim-Keim, who had a traditional punk line-up (guitar, bass, drums), played. They performed a fast and straightforward punk style that focused primarily on intensity. Dieter Ehrlich played the drums and provided vocals, Klaus played the guitar, and Andreas Deubach played bass. Zwitschermaschine were the final act to perform. The band consisted of Sascha Anderson, Cornelia Schleime, and Michael Rom on vocals, Lothar Fiedler on guitar, Matthias Zeidler on bass, and Wolfgang Grossmann on drums. Volker Palma played violin and trombone.

After the recordings were finished, the Ministry for State Security (MfS) visited Günther Spalda from Rosa Extra. This was not a coincidence, as the MfS had learned about the record's production through unofficial collaborators (IMs) Sascha Anderson and Sören Naumann. The MfS threatened the group with five to ten years in prison if they did not surrender the tape with their recordings. The group, which included freelance writers Bert Papenfuß-Gorek and Stefan Döring, was trying to be classified by the state at the time. In the GDR, the only way to be recognised as a professional musician, make recordings, and give official performances was to be classified by a committee of SED officials, music journalists, musicologists, and prominent musicians. After lengthy consultation, the members decided to hand over the master tape to the MfS. The band was later categorised under the name Hard Pop.

These recent developments resulted in Schleim-Keim being allocated an entire LP side instead of just half. To ensure anonymity, Schleim-Keim opted to use an alias for the recordings. It was proposed to keep the "SK" as an abbreviation, so that, after "Salz-Kartoffel" (English: salt-potato), they agreed on calling themselves "Sau-Kerle" (English: sow-guys).

The two remaining master tapes were given to Günther Fischer, a renowned composer for whom Anderson had written lyrics. Fischer transferred the recordings from the ORWO tapes to higher-quality magnetic tapes, as the quality was considered outdated in West Germany. Thanks to Anderson's connections with diplomats from West Berlin, the recordings eventually made it to the other side of the Wall. In West Berlin, Ralf Kerbach, a former member of Zwitschermaschine and now a citizen of the FRG, received the tape. It is still unclear whether Kerbach added another guitar track to the recordings of his former band. Karl-Ulrich Walterbach subsequently received the recordings and took care of their release.

== Release ==
Track list
| A-side (Zwitschermaschine) | B-side (Sau-Kerle) |
|---|---|
| 1. Jeder Satellit hat einen Killersatelliten; 2. Alles oder nichts und noch viel mehr 3. Geh über’n Fluß; 4. Willst du mein Killersatellit sein?; 5. Geh über die Grenze | 1. Alles ist rot 2. Scheiß Norm; 3. Untergrund ist Strategie; 4. Spione im Café; 5. Ende; 6. Haushaltsgeräte; 7. Frankreich |

The album was originally released in 1983 as an LP with the serial number AG 0019. The initial order quantity ranged from 1,500 to 4,000 copies, depending on the source.

The LP was titled DDR von unten (GDR from below), sometimes abbreviated as eNDe, which appears on both the front and back cover. While some speculated that the lettering eNDe was meant to evoke the abbreviation ND for Neues Deutschland, the SED party newspaper, some band members deny this. Instead, the release was intended to signify the end of Zwitschermaschine. It is certain that Sascha Anderson had been using the acrostic in various poems since 1982. He confirmed this version in his biography.

The record was never officially released in the GDR. Only a few copies managed to make it into the country. Sascha Anderson was able to smuggle three copies in by hiding them in the train's toilet. It is believed that Dieter Ehrlich obtained his copy from Anderson. Anderson had allegedly promised Ehrlich money for the production in advance but failed to deliver, leading Ehrlich to break into Anderson's house and steal 120 West Marks as well as the record. When Ehrlich was arrested, his mother hid the record from the MfS. The recording circulated in the GDR on a cassette tape, featuring Zwitschermaschine on the A-side and Schleim-Keim on the B-side.

== Re-release ==
Comparison of the two Schleim-Keim releases
| Original release 1983 | Version by Höhnie-Records 2000 |
|---|---|
| 1. Alles ist rot 2. Scheiß Norm; 3. Untergrund ist Strategie; 4. Spione im Café; 5. Ende; 6. Haushaltsgeräte; 7. Frankreich | 1. Sieh dort 2. Norm; 3. Untergrund & Anarchie; 4. Faustrecht; 5. Spione im Café; 6. Ende; 7. Karnickel |

The complete record has never been re-released, so there is no CD version available. However, Sascha Anderson did use some of the recordings for another split release with his group Fabrik titled "Alles Geld der Welt kostet Geld" (1998) in CD format. Additionally, the Schleime composition "geh übern fluß" was included in the compilation for the book Spannung. Leistung. Widerstand. Magnetbanduntergrund DDR 1979–1990.

The songs on the Schleim-Keim side were released in different versions on the group's later recordings. Frankreich was re-recorded as Faustrecht and Haushaltsgeräte became Karnickel. Only the two titles Ende and Alles ist rot were exclusively reserved for DDR von unten. As part of the re-release of Schleim-Keim's recordings on Höhnie Records, their tracks were added as a limited EP to the vinyl version of the album Nichts Gewonnen Nichts Verloren Vol. 1 - Die Stotterheim-Tapes 1984–87 (2000). The order of the tracks was rearranged and relabeled with their current song names.

== Cover design ==
The front cover is part of Kerbach's Totenreklame-Zyklus a series of images he used for the poetry collection totenreklame, eine Reise by Sascha Anderson. Although the picture, like the other illustrations in this cycle, was created during a 7,000-kilometre journey through the GDR, it was not published in the collection of poems. The cover depicts an anthropomorphic animal figure striking a bulky, rectangular object with a key-shaped object. The chosen background is a household accounts page in grey with a diagonally arranged white field. The text "DDR von unten" is written below with the subtitle "Schallplatte mit 2 Gruppen und Textbeilage". Below the picture is "eNDe". Cornelia Schleime illustrated the reverse side, featuring a drawing of a woman's upper body and head, as well as several unrecognisable objects arranged on a shelf. Schleime's drawing style is influenced by Kerbach's style. The background and signature eNDe remain unchanged. On page 2, there is an essay by Anderson titled "Von einem Beteiligten", where he pens his thoughts on the band's history in lowercase. Additionally, there is a statement by Karl-Ulrich Walterbach regarding the confiscation of the first Slime LP due to the songs "Deutschland muß sterben" and "Bullenschweine". Pages 1 and 4 feature handwritten song lyrics from both groups on scraps of torn-out writing pad pages.

== Music style and lyrics ==
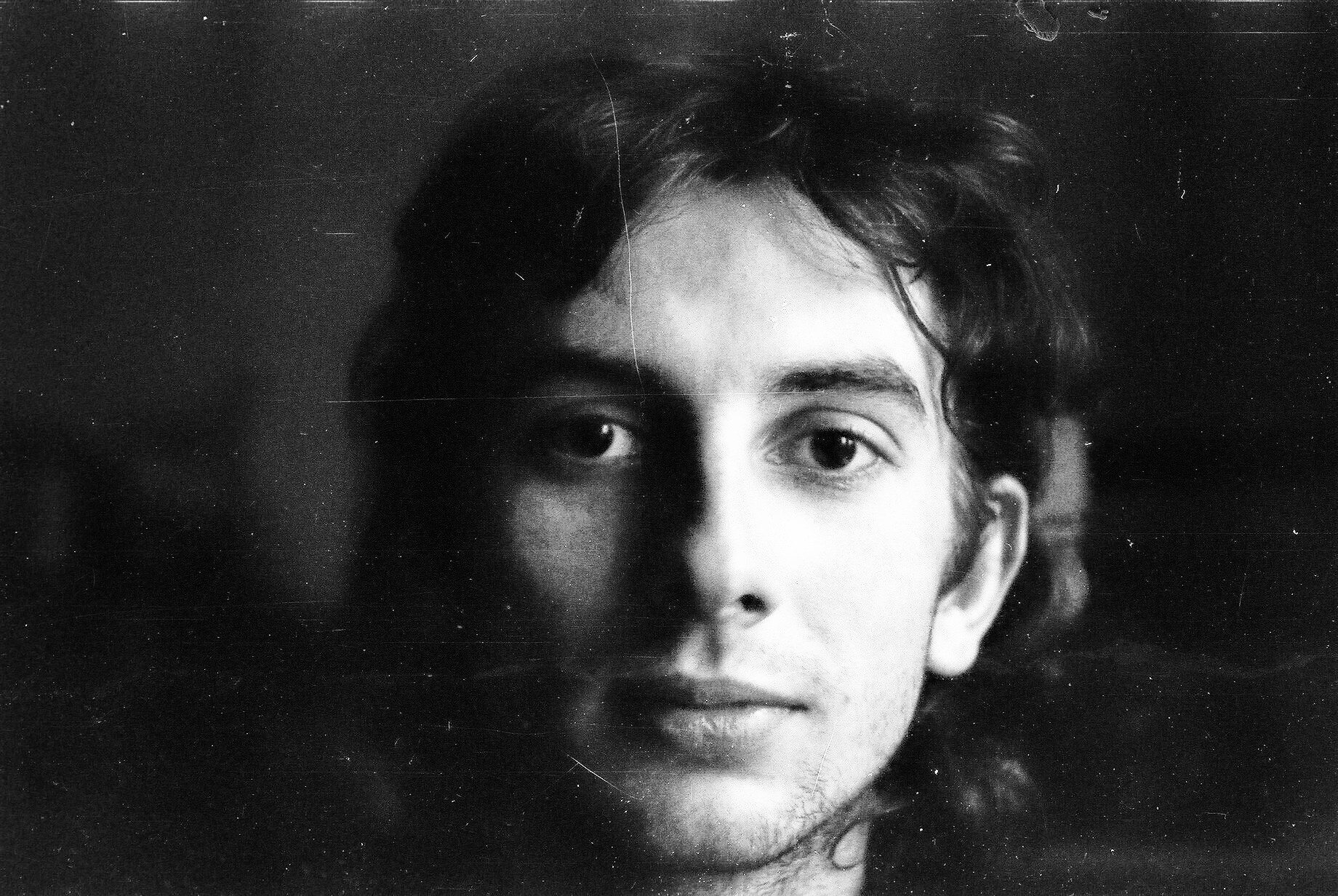
Michael Rom, one of the singers of Zwitschermaschine

At the time of recording, Zwitschermaschine was already disbanding. Following Ralf Kerbach's departure, Sascha Anderson took over leadership of the group, so the pieces seemed to be a solo effort by him. Four out of the five lyrics were written by the artist. Only the arrangement borrowed from the original line-up of Kerbach, Schleime, and Rom. The song Alles oder nichts originated from a band session in the summer of 1982 at the Theater der Jungen Generation Dresden, with Kerbach on guitar. Geh über die Grenze and Jeder Satellit hat einen Killersatelliten were already published in 1982 in poem form in Sascha Anderson's collection of the same name, with illustrations by Ralf Kerbach. Musically, the pieces feature a strong disharmony, with rapid alternation between calm and aggressive passages. Volker Palma's trombone and violin parts are sparse and, like the rest of the music, largely lack a fixed rhythm. Borrowings from jazz lend the music a sound typical of art-punk. The lyrics are performed by the three singers as spoken word. In terms of style, the music is reminiscent of post-industrial bands like Einstürzende Neubauten, punk and no-wave artists such as Patti Smith and Lydia Lunch, and Krautrock bands like Can. The Stranglers also served as an inspiration.

Die Aufnahmen der fertigen LP stellen eher eine Solopräsentation Andersonscher Lyrismen dar. So hatten wir nicht angefangen, aber dahin waren wir gekommen. Das war kein Punk mehr, das waren die überschäumenden Absonderungen eines Selbstdarstellers.
Free Translation: The recordings of the finished LP are more of a solo presentation of Anderson's lyricism. We hadn't started out like that, but we had got there. This was no longer punk, these were the exuberant excretions of a self-promoter.

— Cornelia Schleime, „Jeder Satellit hat einen Killersatelliten“, Hätten wir es nur wörtlich genommen,

Sascha Anderson, on the other hand, described the collaboration as "equal" in a later interview. The lyrical texts deal with themes such as borders (Geh über die Grenze, Geh über'n Fluß) and consumption (Alles oder nichts und noch viel mehr). The satellite motif appears twice.

The B-side of the album presents a contrast. Schleim-Keim, also known as Sau-Kerle, play typical three-chord punk that prioritises speed and heaviness. The majority of the lyrics were written by Dieter Ehrlich, while the music was a joint effort. Ehrlich's vocals are dark and angry, with a Thuringian flavour. The lyrics mostly revolve around the chorus, with individual verses repeated multiple times. In contrast to the versions released later on CD and LP, the songs are much harder due to the poor production. Some of the lyrics are almost unintelligible. Songs like Untergrund ist Strategie, Scheiß Norm and Alles ist rot are not very subtle, but highly subversive and socially critical. Scheiß Norm deals with the compulsion to conform in the GDR, while Untergrund ist Strategie proposes the anarchist underground struggle as a solution. Ende, the only song to be rejected by the Ministry for State Security, criticises hypocrisy in the East. Haushaltsgeräte, on the other hand, is a lighthearted song in which the narrator imagines himself as a rabbit. Spione im Café portrays the widespread paranoia that existed in the GDR. Frankreich (later Faustrecht (rule of fist)) describes the widespread police violence and arbitrary arrests in the GDR in a veiled manner. ("The cops catch you off the street because you're just dirt (...) They punch you in the face, for them you're just a lousy pig (...) They do what they want with you (...) Get you out of your bunk with your arse", free translation).

== Aftermath ==
The State Security began monitoring the members of Schleim-Keim as soon as the recordings were completed. On 28 January 1983, the members were declared "absent". After about two months of surveillance, all three members were taken into custody on 29 March 1983 after long talks with their parents and superiors. Dieter Ehrlich was unemployed at the time. While Deubach and Klaus Ehrlich were released after a few days, Dieter Ehrlich remained in custody for four weeks, two of which were spent in solitary confinement. The lyrics to Ende drew the attention of the state security service due to the lines "I'm no longer ashamed of my homeland, the GDR (...) I'm through with it / Careerists and fascists and only false communists" (free translation). The other song lyrics were described as:

sehr primitiv gestaltete Entäußerungen einer pessimistischen Lebenshaltung mit anarchistischen Zügen, allgemeiner Unzufriedenheit und einer grundsätzlichen Opposition gegenüber der staatlichen Ordnung.
Free translation: very primitive expressions of a pessimistic attitude to life with anarchistic traits, general dissatisfaction and a fundamental opposition to the state order.

— BStU, MfS, BV Erfurt, KD Erfurt, AOP 1794/83,

The group's statements were not taken seriously enough, particularly as the MfS believed that "primitive personalities" were involved. According to Ehrlich's own statements during the interrogations, the texts referred to social conditions in South Africa. The interrogators were therefore unable to incriminate him. Nonetheless, the offence of §219 of the East German Criminal Code (unlawful communication) remained. Ehrlich was subjected to pressure through solitary confinement and the threat of a severe sentence. However, after a month, he was released without punishment and handed over to his mother. All confiscated items were returned to him. It is worth noting that he was listed as an 'unofficial criminal police employee for operational tasks' (IKMO) under the code name 'Richard'. For a year and a half, Ehrlich reported on the punk movement to the MfS in exchange for small sums of money and cigarettes. Despite being repeatedly arrested for short periods until the end of the GDR, he continued to provide information. Dimitri Hegemann, who initiated the record, was banned from entering the GDR and was even prohibited from using the transit route to West Germany for a while.

Although Schleim-Keim was exclusively affected by state repression, Zwitschermaschine was completely spared due to the MfS's fear of exposing its IM Anderson. Sascha Anderson's spying services only became public knowledge in the early 1990s. In his Büchner Prize speech in 1991, Wolf Biermann gave him the nickname "Schwätzer Sascha Arschloch" (chatterbox Sascha arsehole), which subsequently became widely known.

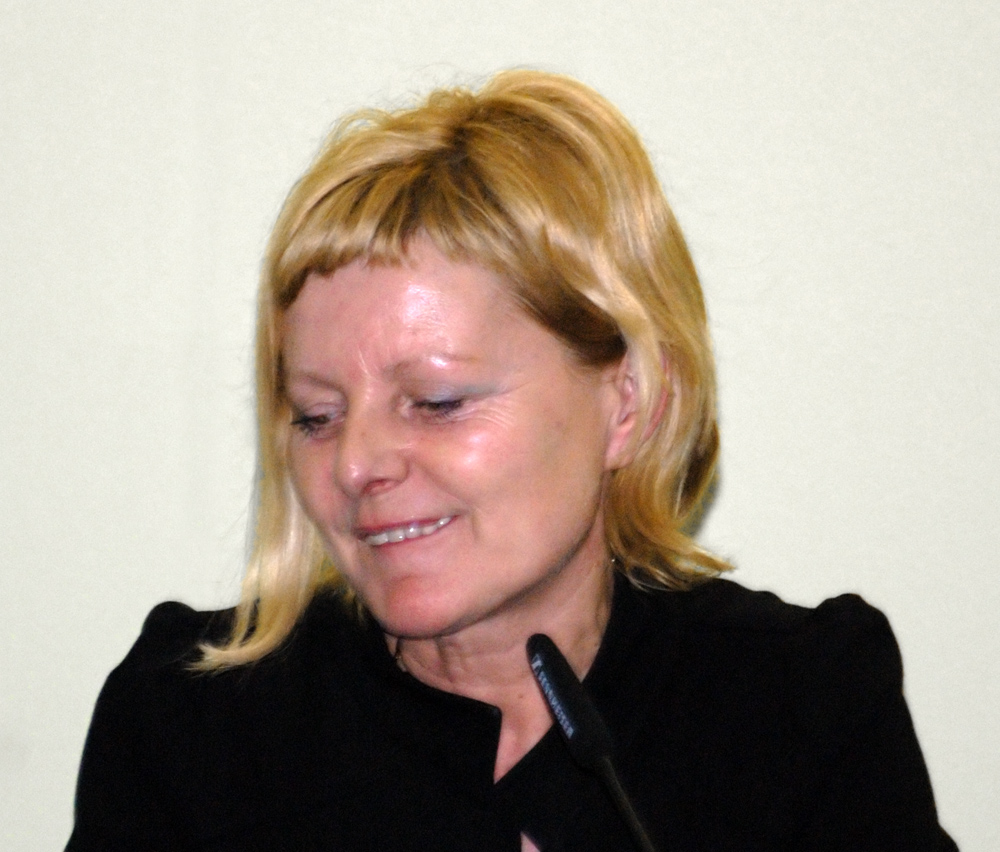
Cornelia Schleime 2008

Cornelia Schleime attempted to leave East Germany by using her film productions and Zwitschermaschine to provoke the MfS. However, she was only able to leave the country in 1984 after threatening a hunger strike and having a phone conversation with Ralf Kerbach, which was intercepted by the MfS. Therefore, her involvement with Zwitschermaschine was only a small part of her journey out of the country.

Ich dachte immer, wenn wir dieses Zeug machen, treibt es meine Ausreise weiter voran, denn ich stellte ja etliche Anträge. Mich wunderte nur, wie glatt alles lief. Aber vielleicht hatten wir dies ja Anderson zu verdanken, von dem wir damals nicht wussten, dass er als IM auf uns angesetzt war.
Free translation: I always thought that if we did this stuff, it would push my departure forward, because I submitted several applications. I was just amazed at how smoothly everything went. But maybe we had Anderson to thank for that, who we didn't realise at the time was an IM on us.

— Cornelia Schleime, Interview in Ox-Magazine #73 (August/September 2007)

She only found out that a best friend at the time had been spying on her for the MfS for years when the "Gauck Office" inspected her files in 1991. According to her, these years of unwanted "undressing" at least gave her the ability to develop an "open relationship" to life. She wrote about her story with Anderson in 2008 in the novel Weit fort.

== Influence and impact ==
Until the Peaceful Revolution in 1989, this split LP was one of only four albums that made it over the Iron Curtain, and it remains one of the few examples of musical underground and resistance in the GDR. The other three, although not quite as influential, were the album Made in the GDR by L'Attentat, the compilation Live in Paradise (1985), and the LP panem et circensis (1986) by the Weimar punk band Der Rest (KG Rest). It was only years later that "the other bands" such as Die Skeptiker, Müllstation, and Feeling B became known. This was mainly because most of the bands did not have a musician's license and were therefore not allowed to play or release their songs on recordings.

The LP challenged the state's recording monopoly and demonstrated that a counter-movement was possible despite major technical restrictions and rigid treatment of musicians in the East. In addition to the Amiga record label, a cassette culture emerged with a few recordings that were shared and sold. Tape trading allowed for circumvention of state repression and increased accessibility to music.

In 1988, individual tracks from the B-side were aired on Radio Glasnost, a program organized by GDR opposition activists on the West Berlin alternative station Radio 100.

Although DDR von unten was never officially released in the GDR, the record spread through the cassette market. However, the GDR punks were mainly interested in the Sau-Kerle side, as it was common knowledge that the Erfurt band Schleim-Keim was behind it. This significantly increased Schleim-Keim's popularity in the East German punk scene. By 1991, Schleim-Keim had also become a well-known name in reunified Germany. Zwitschermaschine did not receive much support from either side. In an interview with Ox in August/September 2007, Cornelia Schleime confirmed that Dieter "Otze" Ehrlich was considered the "only punk rock star in the GDR":

Aus dem Bauch heraus sehe ich das genauso. So richtig gut kannten wir sie am Anfang nicht, aber da wir so gegensätzlich waren, waren wir dann doch von einander angezogen. (…) Zirkelten wir im Intellektuellen, rasten sie drauf los. Sie waren unglaublich echt und ganz sympathische Kerle. Auch waren sie nicht eitel, denn es ging ihnen einzig und allein um die Musik. Eitelkeiten waren sonst bei allen übrigen Bands zu beobachten. Die SCHLEIM-KEIMs haben wirklich mit dem Hammer aus der DDR-Flagge die Sichel zerkloppt.
Free translation: My gut feeling is the same. We didn't really know them that well at first, but because we were such opposites, we were attracted to each other. (...) When we circled around the intellectuals, they went crazy. They were incredibly genuine and very likeable guys. They weren't vain either, because they were only interested in the music. Vanity could otherwise be observed in all the other bands. The SCHLEIM-KEIMs really smashed the sickle out of the GDR flag with its hammer.

— Cornelia Schleime, Interview in Ox-Magazine #73 (August/September 2007)

== Bibliography ==
- Boehlke, Michael; Gericke, Henryk, eds. (2007). Too much future - Punk in der DDR (in German). Berlin: Verbrecher Verlag. ISBN 978-3-935843-91-1.
  - Schleime, Cornelia. ""Jeder Satellit hat einen Killersatelliten", Hätten wir es nur wörtlich genommen". In Boehlke & Gericke (2007), pp. 177–190.
  - Teschner, Dirk. "Neue Zeiten in Thüringen". In Boehlke & Gericke (2007).
- Galenza, Ronald; Havemeister, Heinz, eds. (1999). Wir wollen immer artig sein: Punk, New Wave, HipHop, Independent-Szene in der DDR 1980–1990 (in German) (2nd ed.). Berlin: Schwarzkopf & Schwarzkopf. ISBN 978-3-89602-306-3.
  - Preuß, Torsten. "Zonenpunk in Scheiben: Die erste Punkplatte aus dem Nahen Osten". In Galenza & Havemeister (1999), pp. 69ff.
  - Tannert, Christoph. "Vierte Wurzel aus Zwitschermaschine". In Galenza & Havemeister (1999).
- Hahn, Anne; Willmann, Frank (2008). Satan, kannst du mir noch mal verzeihen: Otze Ehrlich, Schleimkeim und der ganze Rest (in German). Mainz: Ventil. ISBN 978-3-931555-69-6.
- Pehlemann, Alexander; Galenza, Ronald, eds. (2006). Spannung, Leistung, Widerstand: Magnetbanduntergrund DDR,1979–1990 (in German). Berlin: Verbrecher Verlag. ISBN 978-3-935843-76-8.
- Schneider, Frank Apunkt (2013) [2007]. Als die Welt noch unterging: von Punk zu NDW. Bibliothek der Popgeschichte (3rd ed.). Mainz: Ventil-Verl. ISBN 978-3-931555-88-7.
