= Schleim-Keim =

German punk band

Schleim-Keim, Schleimkeim
- Origin: Erfurt, Thuringia, East Germany
- Genres: Deutschpunk, Hardcore
- Years active: 1980–1996, 2008-present (reunion)
- Labels: Nasty Vinyl, Höhne Records, Aggressive Rockproduktionen
- Past members: Original members: Dieter "Otze" Ehrlich (vocals, drums); Klaus Ehrlich (guitar); Andreas "Dippel" Deubach (bass); Additional members: Frank Zieris (bass); Imad Abdul Majid (guitar); Andreas "Fozzy" Link (drums); Thomas Hempt (guitar); Mario "Lippe" Lippmann (drums); Hagen Schröder (bass)

Schleim-Keim or Schleimkeim is a German punk band from the city of Erfurt-Stotternheim in East Germany founded in 1980. Until German reunification, they played primarily in East German churches, and belonged to the musical underground of the German Democratic Republic (GDR). They have been hailed as one of the most important and influential punk bands of the former East Germany. The band was admired by East German youth who were dissatisfied with the communist state.

Schleim-Keim released the first punk record by a band in East Germany, in collaboration with the band Zwitschermaschine. After German Reunification, Schleim-Keim released two albums, as well as five EPs on Höhne Records, which is known for releasing albums from bands like Müllstation and Rasta Knast. Schleim-Keim's songs were included on all three volumes of the famous East German series of punk samplers Sicher gibt es bessere Zeiten, doch diese war die unsere (English translation: "Surely there are better times, but these were ours"). They were featured on the Weird System sampler Punk Rock BRD, the Amiga Records' sampler Die 100 Besten Ost-Songs (English translation: "The 100 best East Songs"), and Major Label/Edition Iron Curtain Radio's 2020 sampler Too Much Future – Punk Rock GDR 1980-1989. Schleim-Keim has also been the subject of an independent biography, and is discussed in several books about German punk.

== Musical style ==
Schleim-Keim play raw punk rock and fast hardcore punk music, as did many bands in the GDR who were influenced by the Sex Pistols, the Dead Kennedys, and Crass. Their song compositions are simple and the lyrics are short, choices made by Otze so that songs could be performed more easily while drunk. Otze also played several different instruments (guitar, drums, vocals). Before the fall of the Berlin Wall, Schleim-Keim performed using electric guitars and amplifiers that were built or modified by Otze. Through these choices as well as Otze’s style of singing, the band developed a distinctive sound. In their later work, the band experimented with elements of ska (in the song Geldschein), new wave (in the songs Mein Weg, Party im Cannabisbeet, Der Tod) and techno (in the song Leck mich am Arsch). Most of these songs were written during the last phase of Schleim-Keim’s activity, and in part were written and recorded by Otze alone as solo works.

== History ==
Schleim-Keim was founded in 1980 by brothers Dieter "Otze" Ehrlich and Klaus Ehrlich, along with Andreas "Dippel" Deubach. In December 1981, Schleim-Keim made their first appearance at the event Werkstatt der Offenen Arbeit (at the time called Gesprächskreis der Offenen Arbeit des Ev. Kirchenkreises Erfurt) in the Johannes-Lang-Haus of the Protestant church in Erfurt. Other bands that performed at this event were the Madmans and the Weimar band Creepers. Through further concerts in churches and other private events, the members of Schleim-Keim met the writer and musician Sascha Anderson, who was the singer for the East Berlin band Zwitschermaschine. Schleim-Keim then produced a split LP with Zwitschermaschine (playing under the pseudonym Sau-Kerle) called DDR von unten; this LP is regarded as the first punk record produced in the GDR; it was released in West Germany through the West Berlin hardcore/punk label Aggressive Rockproduktionen. After this record was released, Otze was arrested for his activities with Schleim-Keim. At the end of 1982, Anderson sent Schleim-Keim to record at a studio near Dresden. Within one hour, the band had recorded seven songs. The song Spione im Café was written spontaneously in this studio session.

In 1984 and 1985, Frank "Anthony" Zieris joined the band on bass. After Klaus Ehrlich left the band in 1986, Otze took over playing lead guitar. From 1986 to 1988 the band had several other changes in line-up: for a short time Imad Abdul Majid (from the East German band L’Attentat) played guitar. Andreas "Fozzy" Link, later a member of Die Fanatischen Frisöre, played drums. The band performed in Jena, as well as in a Catholic church in a village outside of Erfurt. In 1988, Mario "Lippe" Lippmann joined the band as a drummer. They then changed their practice-room from Stotternheim to Lippmann's home town of Gotha.

After German reunification, Schleim-Keim continued to play shows. In the summer of 1991, Andreas Deubach left the band and was replaced by Hagen Schröder on bass. The band dissolved in 1996. After the end of Schleim-Keim, Lippmann und Schröder founded a grindcore/punk band named Aggressive Scum.

In 1999, Otze murdered his father with an axe, and he spent the rest of his life in a psychiatric facility. In 2005 he died of a heart attack.

In 2008 the first edition of the book Satan, kannst du mir noch mal verzeihen. Otze Ehrlich, Schleimkeim und der ganze Rest was published. This biography of the band and its lead singer included extensive interviews from people involved in the Erfurt punk scene at the time. Partly inspired by the book release, in December 2008, Lippmann and Schröder performed at a concert under the name Schleim-Keim at the large festival Punk im Pott im Exil. Further one-off performances followed in 2009. In 2018 and 2019 the band played in Dresden as openers for The Casualties.

In 2019 an expanded edition of the biography was published. In 2021 Schleim-Keim played sold-out shows in Berlin’s SO36 club and Dresden’s Chemiefabrik.

In 2023, a comic book called "Betreten auf eigene Gefahr“ was published about Schleim-Keim. The book contains drawings along with the original song lyrics and explanations of the historical context for the songs.

== Discography ==
=== Albums ===
1. 1983: DDR von unten split-album with Zwitschermaschine, playing under the pseudonym Sau-Kerle (Aggressive Rockproduktionen)
2. 1991: Demo ’91 (Aggressive Punk Tapes)
3. 1992: Abfallprodukte der Gesellschaft (Nasty Vinyl/Höhne Records)
4. 1994: Mach dich doch selbst kaputt – Live in Chemnitz (Nasty Vinyl/Höhne Records)
5. 2000: Nichts gewonnen, nichts verloren, (Die Stotternheim-Tapes 1984–87) (Höhne Records)
6. 2002: Nichts gewonnen, nichts verloren Vol. 2 (Die Gotha-Tapes 1988–90) (Höhne Records)

=== EPs and Singles ===
1. 1992: Schwarz, Rot, Gold - Nie Gewollt EP (Nasty Vinyl/Höhne Records)
2. 1993: Geldschein, EP (Nasty Vinyl/Höhne Records)
3. 1998: Drecksau, EP (Nasty Vinyl/Höhne Records)
4. 2002: Leck mich am Arsch, EP (Nasty Vinyl/Höhne Records)
5. 2018: Alles in Rot, Single (Nasty Vinyl/Höhne Records)

=== Samplers (selected) ===
- 1987: Ausbruchsversuch Nr.1 (Trash Tape Rekords 01 1987)
- 1991: DDR Störfaktor (Aggressive Punk Tapes f*ck 01 1991)
- 1991: Erfurt-Sampler ZÄHNE 91
- 1991: Sicher gibt es bessere Zeiten, doch diese war die unsere Vol. 1
- 1992: Gegen Nazis Sampler
- 1992: Sicher gibt es bessere Zeiten, doch diese war die unsere Vol. 2
- 1993: Sicher gibt es bessere Zeiten, doch diese war die unsere Vol. 3
- 1994: Punk will never die! – WORLD COMPILATION
- 1997: BRD Punk Terror Vol. 1 (Nasty Vinyl)
- 1999: BRD Punk Terror Vol. 2 (Nasty Vinyl)
- 2000: BRD Punk Terror Vol. 3 (Nasty Vinyl)
- 2006: BRD Punk Terror Vol. 5 (Nasty Vinyl)
- 1999: Auferstanden aus Ruinen – der Soundtrack zur Wi(e)dervereinigung (Nasty Vinyl)
- 2003: Punk Rock BRD Vol 1 (Weird System Records)
- 2019: Die 100 Besten Ost-Songs (Amiga Records)
- 2020: Too Much Future – Punk Rock GDR 1980-1989 (Major Label/Edition Iron Curtain Radio)

== Literature ==
- Anne Hahn, Frank Willmann, Satan, kannst du mir noch mal verzeihen. Otze Ehrlich, Schleimkeim und der ganze Rest. Ventil Verlag, Mainz 2008, ISBN 978-3-931555-69-6, expanded 2019, ISBN 978-3-95575-113-5
- Frank Willmann: Wie man in einer Diktatur rebelliert. 40 Jahre Punk: Subkultur war in der DDR etwas Heimliches bis Gefährliches. Ein Fan der ersten Stunde erinnert sich
- Tim Mohr: Burning Down the Haus: Punk Rock, Revolution, and the Fall of the Berlin Wall. Algonquin Books, 2019. ISBN 1616208430
- Florian Lipp, Punk und New Wave im letzten Jahrzehnt der DDR Akteure – Konfliktfelder – musikalische Praxis, 2021, Musik und Diktatur, Band 4, ISBN 978-3-8309-4274-0
- Frank Willmann: Betreten auf eigene Gefahr / Schleimkeim-Songcomics Ein außergewöhnliches Stück DDR-Geschichte in Comic-Form. Mit Comics von Ulla Loge, Auge Lorenz, Dirk Mecklenbeck, Marcus Gruber, Karla Paloma, PM Hoffmann, Kerstin Gürke, Lara Swiontek // Hardcover, Ca. 128 Seiten, 27. April 2023, ISBN 978-3-95575-200-2

== Documentary Films/Radio Programs ==
- Ritchie Ziemek: Interview Schleimkeim / Höhni (Interview with Otze and Lippe from Schleimkeim and Höhnie from Höhnie-Records), in: Stimmbruch, Rockradio B, Radio program from December 29, 1999.
- Thomas Gaevert: Otze – Vom Leben und Sterben eines deutschen Punkidols, Radio feature about Schleim-Keim on the program Tandem of the SWR from April 26, 2010.
- "ostPUNK! too much future" a documentary film directed by Michael Boehlke about the East German punk scene, produced by Jens Meurer, Germany 2006.
