= Cornelia Schleime =

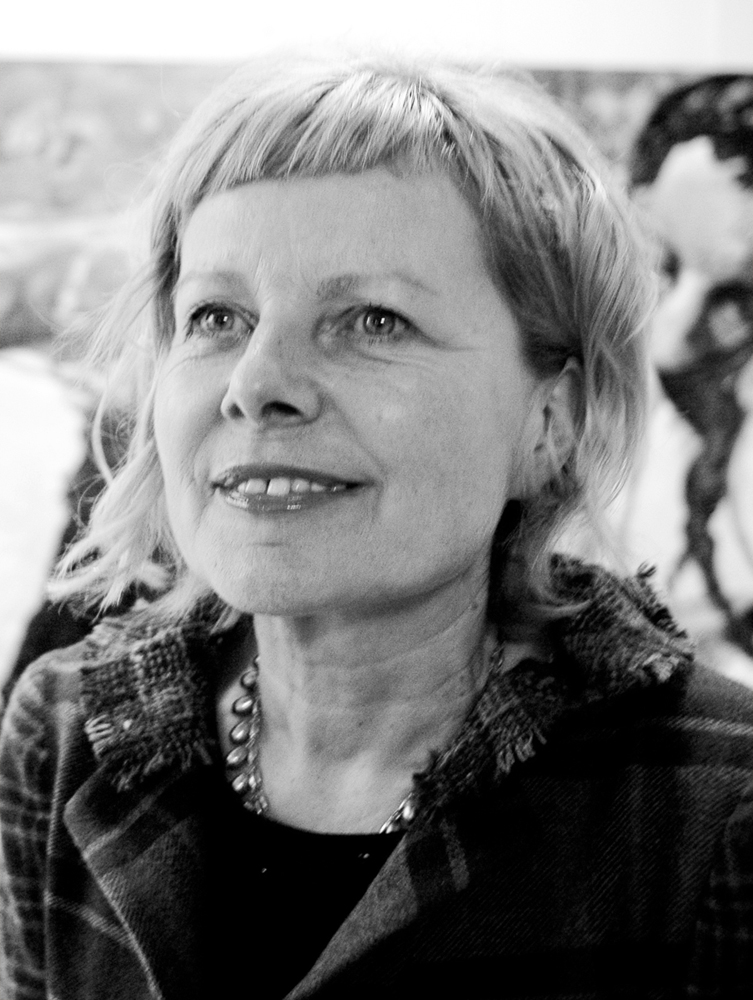
Cornelia Schleime, 2008

Cornelia Schleime (born July 4, 1953) is a German painter, performer, filmmaker and author. Born in East Berlin under the GDR, she studied painting and graphic arts at the Dresden Academy of Fine Arts before becoming a member of the underground art scene.

She was awarded the Hannah Höch Lifetime Achievement Award from the State of Berlin in 2016.

== Life ==
=== Early life in East Berlin ===
Schleime was born in 1953 in East Berlin, East Germany. She grew up under the dictatorship of a "gesetztes Wir" (predefined collective or "We") she had learned very early to retract from the coercions and imputations of a prescribed happiness. A "Community tames extremes". It would "have smoothened out my fractions. I did not want to change anything here, with the exception of myself. I was fed up with the way people betrayed themselves. I didn't want to grow old that way." Rather early she dreamed of going to Morocco like August Macke, in order to "meet my self in the faraway lands, to dive into the opium of unfettered suns." She always wanted to be a traveller and visit the great museums of the world, these power stations of concentrated energy, to meet the Giottos, Masaccios, van Eycks, Vermeers, Manets and Turners there, and "maybe only to stand only once in front of a small watercolour by William Blake."

In a 1996 interview, Schleime reflects on her life in East Berlin's effect on her work "I believe in general, and here I refer to the time in the East, that the oppression or limitations which I experienced did not influence painting. The painting was or is not for me a processing machine for political or personal emergency. In any case, I suffered more from the provinciality of the GDR than from their politics, so our conversations in the East were so often centered around the "universal." No, I can handle nothing with my painting. My work should be purpose-free, only in this way can I open up new spaces. In the east I had one of the cops, who was standing at the Friedrichstrasse junction, with the umbrella - that was the way to get my frustration, not the brush!"

Both Schleime's parents were of catholic origin, her father is from the Rhineland and her mother from Gdansk (Danzig). They moved to Berlin (East) after the war. Her father, who had been married before, could not marry her mother in church, according to catholic rules. So the grandparents only consented to the partnership under the condition that Schleime be raised strictly catholic. Her experience with Catholicism is a consistent influence to her works.

Between 1970 and 1975 Schleime completed a hairdresser's apprenticeship and a studied as a camouflage and make-up artist. She later worked as a stable-girl at the Dresden Thoroughbred Races and as a nursing assistant for a short time.

=== Studies at Dresden Academy of Fine Arts ===
Schleime began her studies of painting and graphic arts at the Dresden Academy of Fine Arts in 1975. In 1980 she received her diploma in painting and graphic arts at the Academy of Arts at the Brühlsche Terrasse.

=== Association with feminism ===
A number of artists, including Schleime, were contributing to a strong feminist voice within East German underground art, working with a clear feminist idiom and feminist content, without realizing they were or actively participating in a larger international feminist debate. In a 2016 interview Schleime confronted the comparison of her works to 1970s feminist avant-garde artists Annegret Soltau and Hannah Wilke: "Of course I had heard of these artists. But I wasn’t interested in feminism at all. When I went to the West, the feminists thought they had found a comrade-in-arms. But they were wrong. My actions aren’t directed against men. They’re directed against the fact that they stripped me of the freedom to show my art, and so I got naked and tied myself up. I didn’t do it for sexual reasons. I got naked because I was forced to be naked. The GDR took everything I had. I also did those things where I enveloped myself in barbed wire. It was more about vulnerability, about being at someone’s mercy, about Christ with the crown of thorns. I am closer to Arnulf Rainer than to the feminists. He speaks of the negation of all extravagance. Everything that is excessive is negated. He tried to reduce everything and overpainted his works until only a bleating mouth peeped out."

=== Türenausstellung ===
In her undergraduate days, Schleime belonged to a group of young artists who formed a counter-movement to official GDR art policy. The artists pursued new experimental paths and devised alternative presentation formats in studios and private homes. Schleime began her exploration of performance art with works such as a "Raum des Dichters" (Room of the Poet) in the autumn of 1979 as part of this. The group refused to exhibit conventional art as defined by the authorities in the GDR and developed a project of working on a topical issue relevant to their generation. They agreed on a proposal by Michael Freudenberg to choose the theme of doors, an associative response to being in a country enclosed by a wall. In the autumn of 1979, the Leonhardi Museum in Dresden (the former studio-house of the Dresden late Romantic Eduard Leonhardi) hosted the group's collaborative work “Türenausstellung” (“Exhibition of Doors”). Michael Freudenberg, Monika Hanske, Volker Henze, Ralf Kerbach, Helge Leiberg, Reinhard Sandner, Cornelia Schleime and Karla Woisnitza each created an installation, while Thomas Wetzel organised four outdoor actions relating to the theme. The exhibition attracted attention from the general public, with A. R. Penck claiming that it represented “the beginning of victory over false consciousness (falsches Bewußtsein)!”.

Her participation in this exhibition, her broad definition of art and her unconventional works and shows resulted in an exhibition ban for her in 1981. In an interview in 2017 she explains that she planning an exhibition that was prevented. "The exhibition manager told me that the culture ministry had imposed a ban on my work. I started working with the pseudonym CMP [Cornelia Monica Petra, Schleime’s full name] so that they wouldn’t know it was me... I was never an enemy of the state or anything like that, I just had a different visual concept. I was told, for instance, that a woman I’d painted, with her head hanging down in a melancholy, surreal expression, didn’t look as she should according to socialism."

=== Zwitschermaschine ===
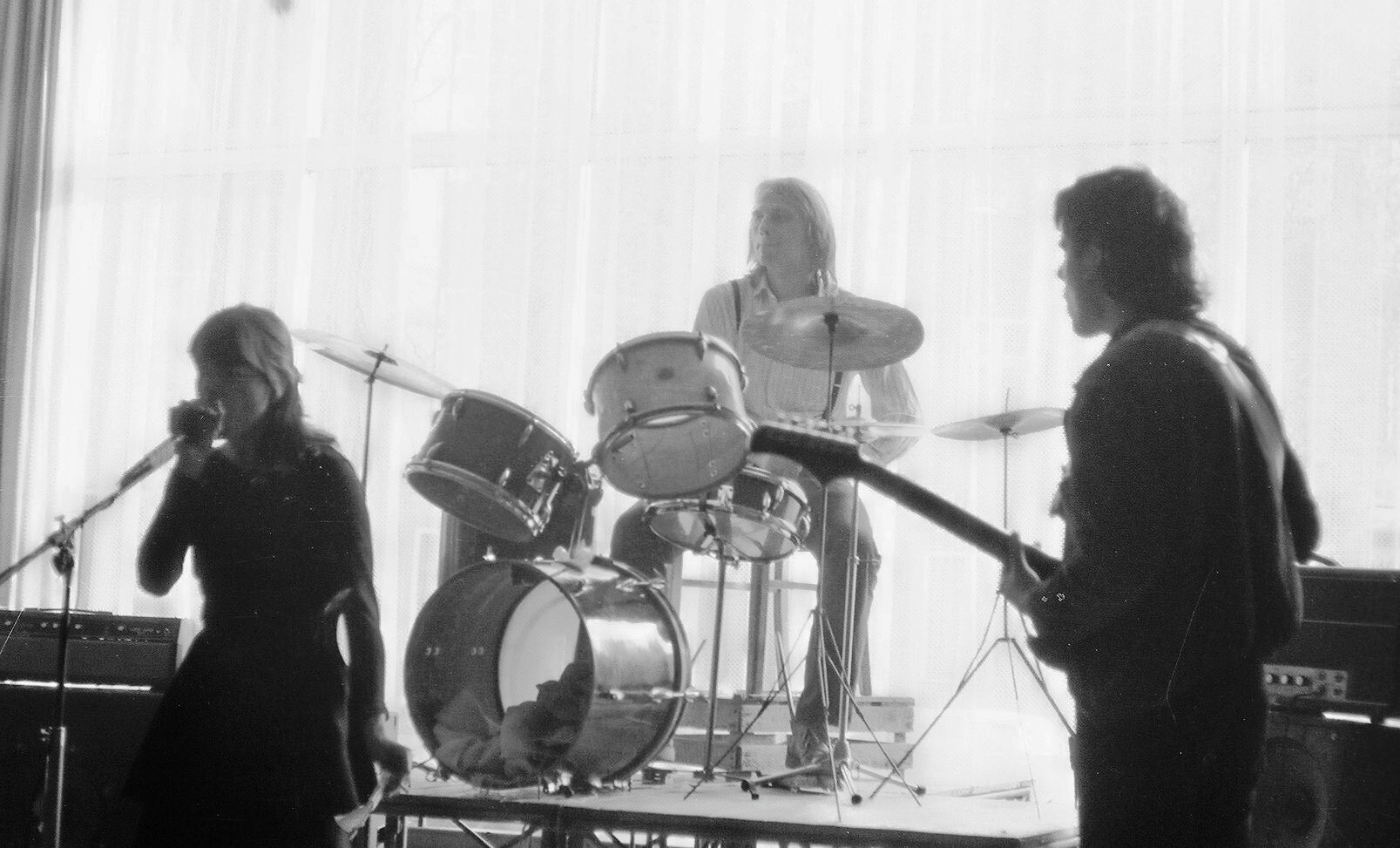
Schleime as the vocalist in Zwitschermaschine

Cornelia Schleime and Ralf Kerbach met at the Dresden University of Fine Arts and created the art-punk band Zwitschermaschine, or "Twittering". After a failed art exhibition in the Radeburg Heimatmuseum, organized by Michael Rom, they decided to make music together. The band lasted from 1979 to 1983, when they managed to release a split album with Schleim-Keim with the title DDR von unten (GDR from below). Ralf Kerbach, inspired by the Sex Pistols and the Stranglers, was guitarist. Schleime was the vocalist and was accompanied by Matthias Zeidler on bass and Wolfgang Grossmann on drums. The band name resulted either from Ralf Kerbach's predilection for Paul Klee's homonymous picture, or from a performance of Luis Buñuel's film An Andalusian dog. They performed in studios, In the drama school Ernst Busch and in the Erfurt "gallery in the hall". Some concerts were canceled by the state power. Musically, they were characterised as New Music, the dilettantism of the opening days led to a sort of Dadaist concept, which was located somewhere in the intersection of sophisticated music and three-chord punk. Schleime later learned that one of their friends had been recruited to spy on them. She said in a 2017 interview that "the punk band actually wasn’t an act of rebellion, it was just a way of expressing myself since I wasn’t allowed to exhibit art."

=== Transition to West Berlin ===
After graduating, she moved from University in Dresden back to East Berlin's Prenzlauer Berg, where she came into contact with the civil rights movement and Sascha Anderson, a close friend of hers who was later revealed to be part of the Stasi that was spying on her. In 1984, five years before the fall of the Berlin Wall, Schleime was permitted to leave for the West. This move meant, however, that she had to leave all her work behind in East Germany. Almost her entire body of works up to that date remained in the GDR and has disappeared. Schleime recalls "I went to the West with four or five pictures under my arm, a duvet, and my son. After I had found an apartment, the transport of my works was supposed to be organized. In the 24 hours, a girlfriend came and made a list of everything: 95 oil paintings, sculptures, and the photographic documentation of my actions. When she arrived, the apartment had been broken into and there was only garbage lying around."

In 1989 she moved to New York City on a one-year stipend for a working fellowship for the Senate for Cultural Affairs Berlin. Schleime was then part of the MOMA PS1's National and International Studio Program Exhibition from 1990 to 1991 (March 3–March 24, 1991) on a DAAD scholarship. She states in her 2016 interview that "Through the USA I had finally acclimated myself to the West, had finally arrived. It took me a long time, as a woman without work. I had to start from scratch again in the West."

Schleime currently lives and works in Berlin and Brandenburg.

=== Various travels ===
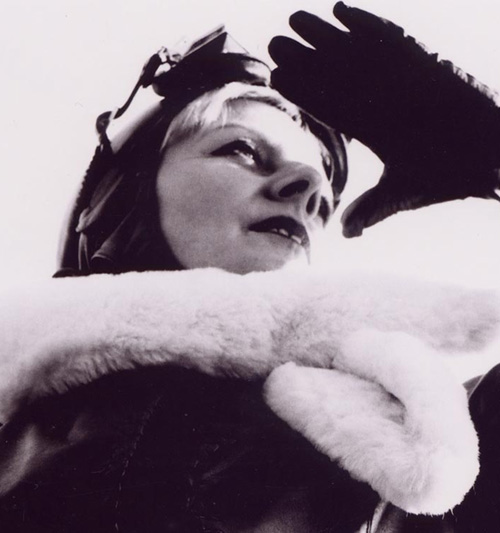
Cornelia Schleime, self-portrait as a pilot, 2001

In 1992 she was the Project and Work Fellowships Kunstfonds Bonn - Prize Winner of the project "Mauer im Kopf", Foundation for New Cultural Studies in Kenya. In 1993 she participated in ONLY - a Reisestipendium (travel scholarship) to Indonesia until 1994. In 1997 she participated in a workshop of the German-Brazilian Cultural Association in Salvador, Brazil. In 1998–99 she embarked on a study tour in Hawaii.

=== Awards ===
She was awarded The Gabriele-Münter-Prize in 2003. Awarded the Fred Thieler Prize in 2004. Received an award for excellent painting in 2005 from the National Art Museum of China. Received an honorary scholarship at the Künstlerhaus Lukas in Ahrenshoop in 2010. In 2016 Schleime was awarded the Hannah Höch Preis from the State of Berlin for her life's work.

== Work ==
While in school she often visited the Sächsische Landesbibliothek (Saxonian County Library) where she discovered Arnulf Rainer, Cy Twombly, Francis Bacon. After graduating from the Dresden School, her work shifted from the classical traditions. She experimented with coffee-grounds and sand bound by glue, a technique she still uses today to break up the even surface, painting by means of scratching and scarring and making marks. In the early 1980s, Schleime drew, painted and wrote poetry, explored performance art and eventually began making films, particularly with the use of Super 8 film.

After leaving for the West it was found that in the years preceding she had been closely monitored by the Stasi. From the Stasi records that she was allowed to look at after the fall of the Wall, she created the series “Until Further Good Collaboration, No. 7284/85” In which she performs her file to meet and then exceed the judgments and speculations of her observers. Also around this time she began her ongoing series with the conceptual theme of braids, the most recent being in 2015. On the inception of this she says "There was a text in my Stasi file that read as follows: “Beyond these investigations, the ABV had no other information because Schleime behaved very inconspicuously.” So I thought: I'll satirize that. I bought a wig, wove hemp into it and lengthened it to four meters or so, attached a pram to the back and found out where Sascha Anderson's commanding officer's house was. Then I walked back and forth in front of the house with the baby carriage. A ZDF television team was there. I saw that the curtains moved and he was of course scared stiff." She identifies this series as her only truly conceptual work.

Schleime's painting style is inspired by artists that were a strong influence in her classical studies such as Bacon and Balthus, Monet, Rembrandt, and Van Gogh. After coming to the West, she first experienced a compulsion to paint classically, works such as “The East is Gray.” She also recreated pieces left behind in the GDR in poetic works resembling landscapes. She countered this with her experimental performance pieces.

Schleime has focused since the 1990s on figures and large-format portraits. Sources of inspiration are glossy magazines, reproductions of all kinds, but also personal photographs or snapshots found at flea markets. Through the intuitive act of drawing or painting, she turns those she depicts into something creative of her own, projecting them in new roles, symbolically emphasising the poses encountered or highlighting aspects with a touch of fantasy and irony.

== Selected works ==
=== Solo exhibitions (selection) ===
- Galerie Aschenbach, Amsterdam / Netherlands (1986,1987,1989,1991,1995)
- Super 8 Painting Diaries and Poems, Hallwalls Contemporary Arts Center, Buffalo / USA; Collective for living Cinema Inc., New York, USA (1989)
- Passing, Galerie Schuster, Frankfurt (1997)
- Cornelia Schleime drawings, ARVORE Cooperativa de Actividades, Porto / Portugal (with Sobral Centeno) (1998)
- Gallery Barbara Biesterfeld, St. Moritz, Switzerland (1999)
- From here to there, the place changed, Galerie Michael Schultz, Berlin (2000)
- Vinegar and blood, Brandenburg Kunstverein Potsdam eV, Potsdam (with Norbert Bisky) (2002)
- Cornelia Schleime. Canvas paintings and pictures on paper, Anhaltischer Kunstverein Dessau eV, Dessau (2002)
- The paradise can wait, Galerie Michael Schultz, Berlin (2003)
- Cornelia Schleime. Helge Leiberg, Ludwig Gallery Schloss Oberhausen, Oberhausen (2004)
- Fred Thieler Prize for Painting 2004, Lapidarium, Berlinische Galerie, Berlin (2004)
- Cornelia Schleime, selected works 2002–2005, Galerie Peters-Barenbrock, Ahrenshoop (2005)
- Blind Date, Kunsthalle Tübingen, Tübingen, Germany (2008)
- Natural Transformations, Livingstone Gallery, The Hague / Netherlands (2009)
- Whoever drinks from me will be a deer, Galerie Michael Schultz, Berlin (2010)
- Cornelia Schleime. Painting, Winter Gallery, Wiesbaden (2010)
- Half Under Water, Cornelia Schleime, Painting, Drawing, Objects, New Kunsthaus, Ahrenshoop (2011)
- Cornelia Schleime, Michael Schultz Gallery, Seoul, Korea (2012)
- Midnight sister, paintings and watercolors, KunstHaus, Potsdam (2013)
- Eyes to and through, Livingstone Gallery, The Hague (2015)
- Eyes in focus - loop in hair, Michael Schultz Gallery, Berlin (2015)
- I do not show anything, Museum van Bommel van Dam, Venlo, Netherlands (2016)

=== Group exhibitions (selection) ===
- Report 85, Staatliche Kunsthalle Berlin, Berlin (1985)
- Momentary view, Staatliche Kunsthalle Berlin, Berlin; Brasilia / Brazil; São Paulo / Brazil; Caracas / Venezuela; Vienna, Austria (1987–88)
- Eberhard Roters in Honor, Martin-Gropius-Bau, Berlin (1989)
- Berlin at the front, DA Gallery, Pomona, Los Angeles / USA (1990)
- International Artist Program, MOMA PS1, New York / USA (1991)
- Real-Time Positions of German Art, National Museum of Contemporary Art, Oslo / Norway (1992)
- Découvertes - pictures from Germany. Ten artists from the collection of the Deutsche Bank, Grand Palais, Paris / France (1993)
- Young artists from the former GDR, 3rd exhibition in the Focus-Passage of Burda-Verlag, Munich (1994)
- Manual Devices - The hand as a motif in contemporary art, special exhibition ART Frankfurt, Frankfurt am Main (1995)
- Bohème and Dictatorship, German Historical Museum Berlin, Berlin (1997)
- Praga Magica, Oro e Nero, Palazzo dei Sette, Orvieto / Italy (1998)
- International Biennial / New Watercolor, Kunststation Kleinsassen, Kleinsassen (1998)
- Et in arcadia ego, artLab Gallery Hilger, Vienna / Austria; Kunsthalle IV Art Association Lingen, Lingen (2001)
- Klopfzeichen - Art and culture of the 80s in Germany, Delusion, Museum of Fine Arts, Leipzig; Museum Folkwang, Essen (2002)
- Public Private - the image of the private in the post-war German photography, Gallery for Contemporary Art, Leipzig (2003)
- Marilyn. Una vida Llegendària, Consorci de Museus de la Comunitat, Valencia, Spain; Bir Efsanenin Yasami. Marilyn, Beyoglu Sanat Galerisi, Istanbul / Turkey (2004)
- Declaration, National Museum of Contemporary Art, Seoul, Korea (2004)
- Eastpunk too much future, Künstlerhaus Bethanien, Berlin (2005)
- Back to the figure - painting of the present, Kunsthalle of the Hypokulturstiftung, Munich (2006)
- 100 years Kunsthalle Mannheim, Kunsthalle Mannheim, Mannheim (2007)
- Art of two Germanys / Cold War Cultures, Los Angeles County Museum of Art, Los Angeles / USA (2008)
- Defiance & Melancholy. German Painting from the Dresden Albertinum / Gallery New Masters, Helsinki City Art Museum, Helsinki / Finland (2009)
- 40 years present, 40 artists from the Deutsche Bank Collection, Deutsche Bank Luxembourg / Luxembourg (2010)
- Discovered! Rebellious artists in the GDR, Kunsthalle Mannheim (2011)
- Women - Love and life, collection Klöcker, Lehmbruck Museum Duisburg (2013)
- Hunting, six artists, urban and industrial museum, Wetzlar (2013)
- Change of Views Ahrenshoop - Yesterday & Today Part 2, Kunstmuseum Ahrenshoop, Ahrenshoop (2014)
- Good art? Wollen !, Works from the collection SØR Rusche, Open on AEG, Nuremberg (2015)
- How heavy is time ?, Gallery Livingstone, The Hague / Netherlands (2016)

=== Films and performances ===
- Super 8 Productions from 1982 to 1984: In the hourglass, mirrored trap, intermediate gold and yellow can only fall light, The kidney bed, Under white cloths, Puttennest'
- When the pictures learned to run
- Body painting (Hüppstedt 1981)
- Mouth On Nose (1982)
- Hölderlin Performance in WDR, Experimental film festival Kino Eiszeit, Berlin (together with Michael Wildenhain) (1984)
- Experimental Film Festival, Osnabrück (1987)
- International Forum of Super 8, Exit Art Gallery, New York, USA (1988)
- My Chrysler (1989)
- Self-production with Braid (1993)
- Die Stasiserie (1993)
- Counter-images. Filmische Subversion in the GDR 1976–89, Filmmuseum Potsdam (1996)
- Germany pictures, artist videos, artist films, experimental films, cinemas in Martin-Gropius-Bau, Berlin (1997)
- ICESTORM, International Inc., University of Massachusetts, GDR Underground Films, Massachusetts, USA (2000)
- Concrete Emotions: Personal Spaces and Urban Landscapes, Tate Modern and Goethe Institute, London / England (2009)
- 19th Cottbus Film Festival - Eastern European Film Festival, Cottbus (2009)
