= Peter Huchel =

German poet

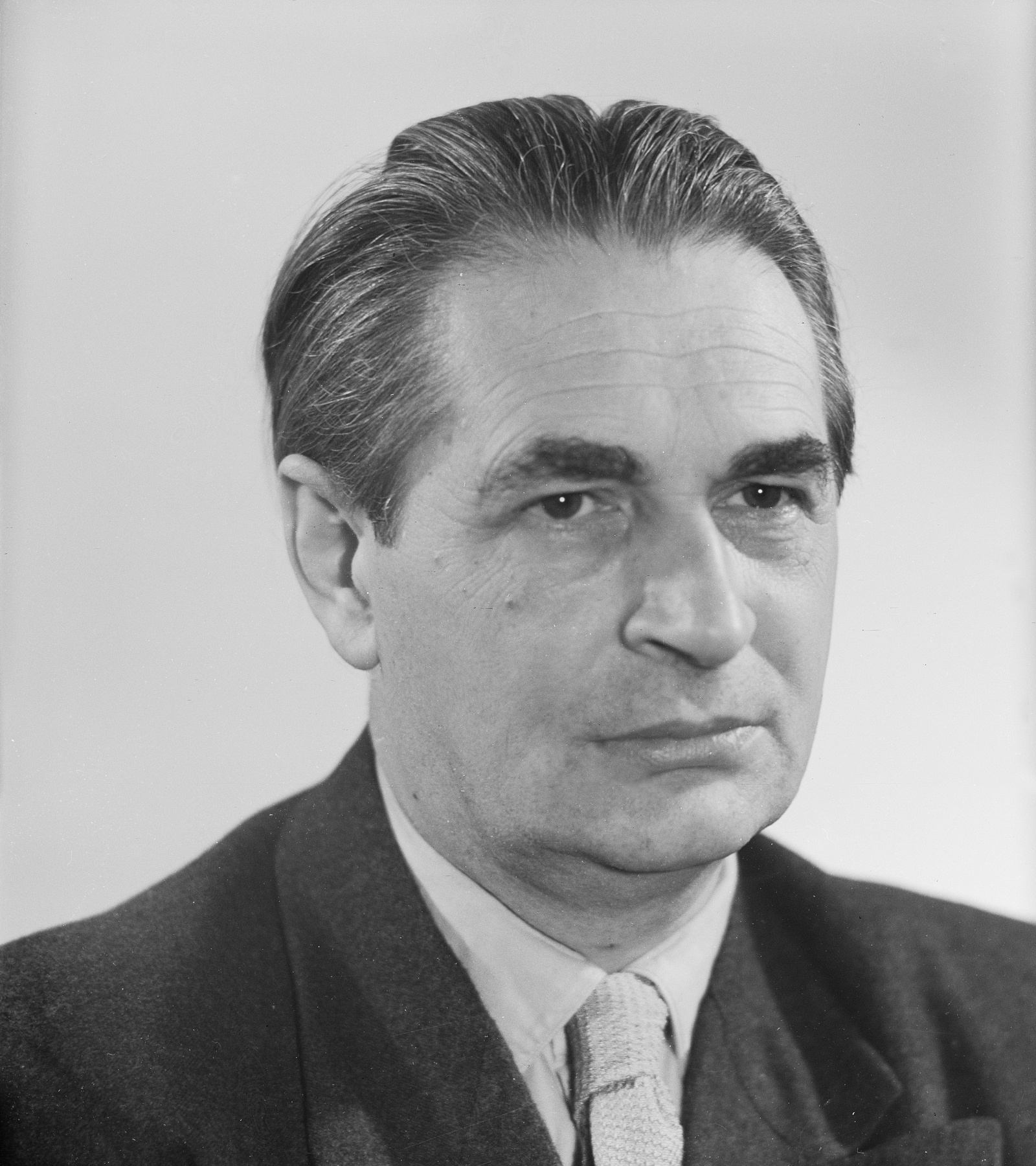
Huchel in Berlin, 1956

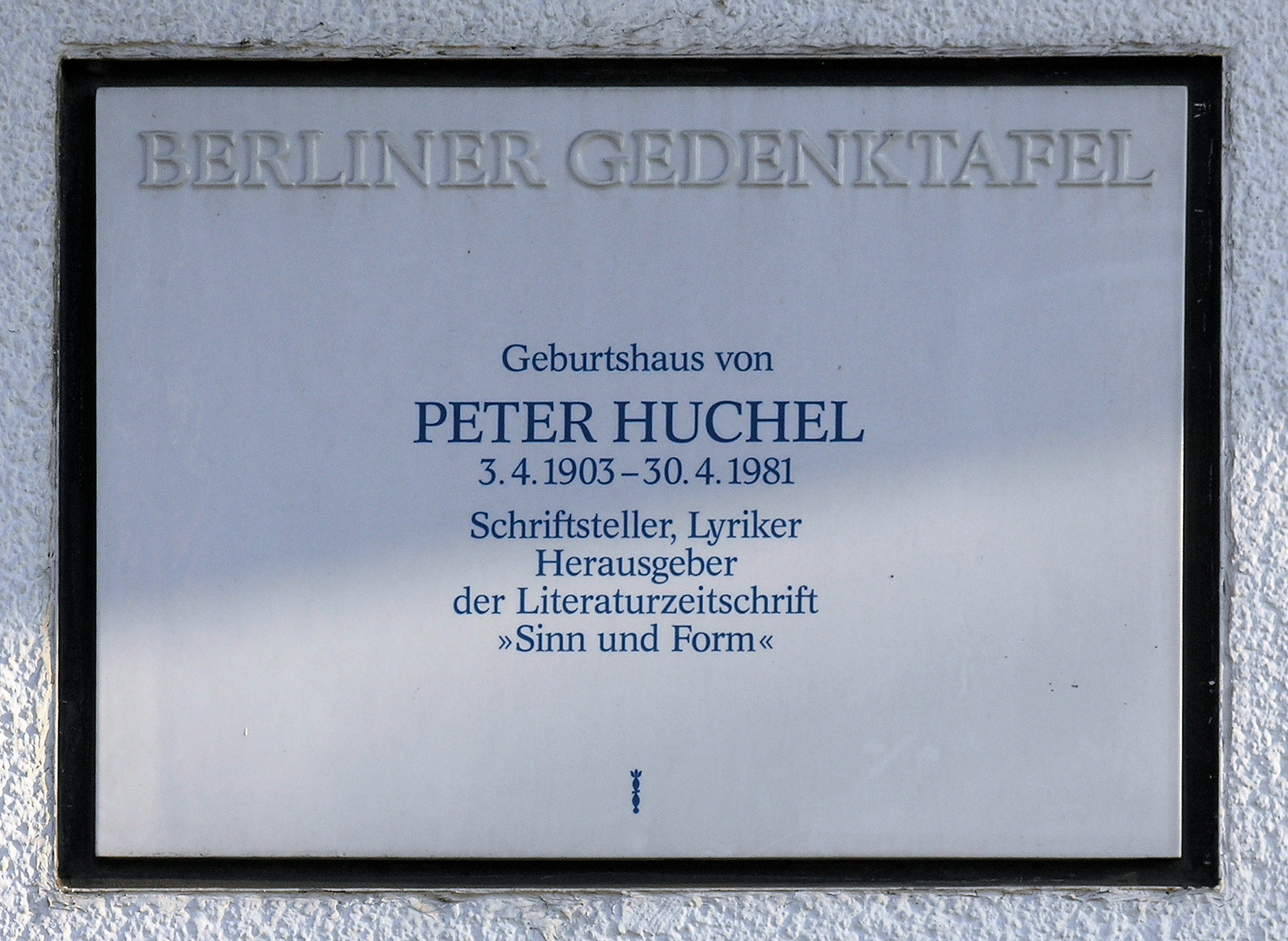
Berlin memorial plaque, Peter Huchel, Hindenburgdamm 32, Berlin-Steglitz, Germany

Peter Huchel (April 3, 1903 – April 30, 1981), born Hellmut Huchel, was a German poet and editor.

== Life ==
Huchel was born in Lichterfelde (now part of Berlin). From 1923 to 1926, Huchel studied literature and philosophy in Berlin, Freiburg and Vienna. Between 1927 and 1930, he travelled to France, Romania, Hungary and Turkey. In 1930, he changed his first name to Peter and befriended Ernst Bloch, Alfred Kantorowicz and Fritz Sternberg. His early poems, published from 1931 to 1936, are strongly marked by the atmosphere and landscape of Brandenburg.

In 1934, Huchel married Dora Lassel. The couple would divorce in 1946 and Huchel would marry Monica Rosental in 1953. Between 1934 and 1940, Huchel wrote plays for German radio. During the Second World War, he served as a soldier until he was taken prisoner by the Russians in 1945. After his release, he began working for East German radio and in 1949, he became editor of the influential poetry magazine Sinn und Form ("Sense and Form"). After the building of the Berlin Wall in 1961, Huchel came under attack from the East German authorities and the following year he was forced to resign from his position at Sinn und Form. From 1962 to 1971, he lived in isolation under Stasi surveillance in his house in Wilhelmshorst near Berlin. In 1971, he was finally permitted to leave the German Democratic Republic and move, first to Rome, then to Staufen im Breisgau, where he later died. The poem and song "Ermutigung", written by his friend Wolf Biermann in 1968, was dedicated to Huchel.

== Works ==
- Im Jahre 1930, in: Die Literarische Welt (1931) Nr. 45, S. 4.
- Gedichte (Poems) (1948)
- Chausseen, Chausseen. Gedichte (1963)
- Die Sternenreuse. Gedichte 1925–1947 (1968)
- Gezählte Tage. Gedichte (1972)
- Die neunte Stunde. Gedichte (1979)
- Gesammelte Werke (Collected Works); 2 vols., Vol. 1: Poems, Vol. 2: Miscellaneous Writings; ed. Axel Vieregg, Frankfurt am Main, 1984
- Wie will man da Gedichte schreiben. Briefe 1925–1977 (How could someone write poems under such circumstances? Letters) ed. Hub Nijssen, Frankfurt am Main, 2000
- A Thistle in His Mouth. Poems by Peter Huchel, selected, translated and introduced by Henry Beissel. Cormorant Books, Dunvegan, Ontario 1987.*
- On Crutches of Naked Poplars. Translated by Robert Firmage. Mid-American Review Vol. XI, Nr. 1, 1991, p. 137–187.*
- The Garden of Theophrastus and other poems. Translated by Michael Hamburger. Cheadle 1983. Again: Anvill Press 2004*
- Peter Huchel. Selected Poems. Translated by Michael Hamburger. Cheadle 1974.*
