= Chausseestraße 131 =

Studio album by Wolf Biermann
- Released: 1968
- Recorded: 1968
- Genre: Liedermacher, Protest music
- Length: 40:37
- Label: Wagenbachs Quartplatte (Verlag Klaus Wagenbach)

Wolf Biermann chronology
| Wolf Biermann (Ost) zu Gast bei Wolfgang Neuss (West) (1965) | Chausseestraße 131 (1968) | Warte nicht auf beßre Zeiten (1973) |

Chausseestraße 131 is the second LP recorded by East German Liedermacher and poet Wolf Biermann, after Wolf Biermann (Ost) zu Gast bei Wolfgang Neuss (West), an album recorded together with Wolfgang Neuss. It was his first album released after the Socialist Unity Party officially blacklisted him from performing or releasing music through the East German music monopoly VEB Deutsche Schallplatten. Due to being blacklisted, Biermann was unable to use a professional recording studio to record the album, forcing him to record in his apartment at Chausseestraße 131 using a Grundig tape recorder and a Sennheiser omnidirectional microphone smuggled in from West Germany. Because of this, the sound of traffic outside his apartment can be heard in the background.

In 1969, Biermann received the Fontane Prize, an award established by the state of Berlin in 1948. Biermann caused a minor scandal by publicly passing it on to the Außerparlamentarische Opposition (APO), a political protest group that played a central part of the German student movement. The same action had also been taken by Peter Schneider, an earlier recipient of the prize. Biermann also transferred 10,000 DM of the prize money to Horst Mahler, who at the time was a lawyer active within the APO.

== Track listing ==
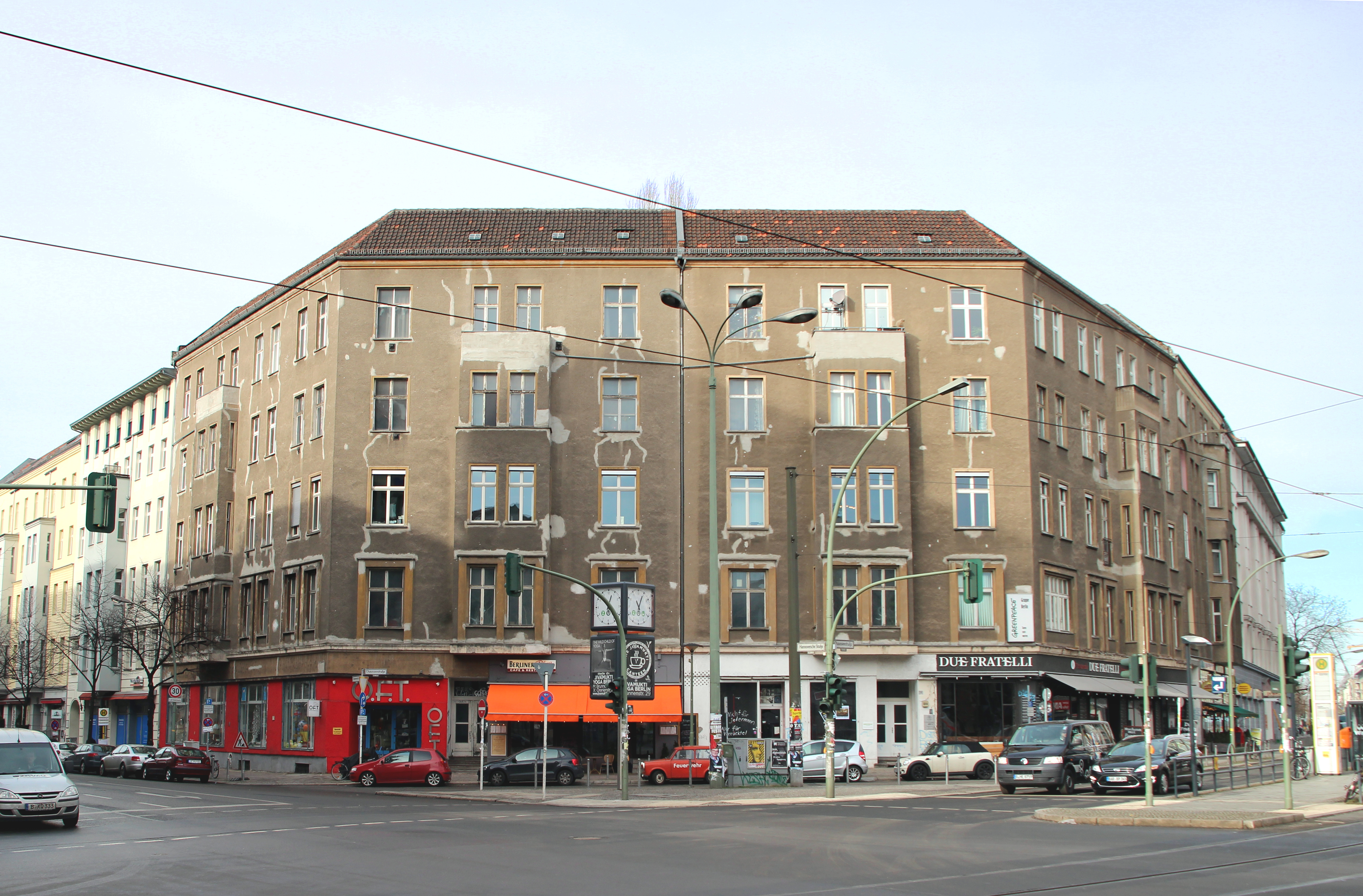
The building at Chausseestr. 131 where the album was recorded

=== A-side ===
1. Die Hab Ich Satt! - 5:14
2. Das Barlach-Lied - 3:02
3. Deutschland - Ein Wintermärchen (1. Kapitel) Und Ballade Auf Den Dichter François Villon - 6:22
4. Wie Eingepfercht In Kerkermauern - 3:23
5. Zwischenlied - 1:31

=== B-side ===
1. Frühling Auf Dem Mont-Klamott - 5:06
2. Moritat Auf Biermann Seine Oma Meume In Hamburg - 5:01
3. Großes Gebet der alten Kommunistin Oma Meume in Hamburg - 4:59
4. So soll es sein - so wird es sein - 5:59
