= Ermutigung =

1968 poem and song by Wolf Biermann

Song by Wolf Biermann

from the EP 4 neue Lieder
- Language: German
- English title: "Encouragement"
- Published: 1968
- Recorded: 1968
- Genre: Political song
- Label: Verlag Klaus Wagenbach; Columbia Records (1974)
- Songwriter: Wolf Biermann

"Ermutigung" ("Encouragement") is a poem and song by the German Liedermacher and lyricist Wolf Biermann. It was first published in 1968 in the poetry collection Mit Marx- und Engelszungen by Verlag Klaus Wagenbach, which also released the poem set to music as part of the single "4 neue Lieder" ("4 New Songs"). Biermann later released the song on his 1974 LP album aah-ja!, released by Columbia Records.

The text of "Ermutigung" warns the listener/reader not to become hardened or embittered. The final verse ends with the optimistic image of a coming spring. Biermann dedicated the poem to his friend Peter Huchel, who was under house arrest and surveillance by the Stasi at the time. It also reflected on his own resignation as a blacklisted East German artist. The song version was popular in both East and West Germany and remains one of Biermann's most famous songs.

== Content ==
The text begins with the following verse:

Du, laß dich nicht verhärten
in dieser harten Zeit.
Die allzu hart sind, brechen,
die allzu spitz sind, stechen
und brechen ab sogleich.

You, don't let yourself become hardened
in these hard times.
Those who are overly hard will break
those who are overly pointed will pierce
and break off immediately.

In the following three verses, the listener is addressed in a similar manner and told not to become embittered, terrified, or worn down, stating that the goal of "those in power" is for the listener to give up fighting before the final conflict happens, which is what the people in power secretly fear.

The fourth verse ends with the lines:

Du kannst nicht untertauchen,
du brauchst uns, und wir brauchen
grad deine Heiterkeit.

You cannot go into hiding,
you need us and we need
your cheerfulness right now.

While the first four verses begin anaphorically with "You, don't let yourself be...", the fifth and final verse switches from "You" to "We", which had already surfaced in the third and fourth verses.

The poem ends with the following verse, calling the listener to action:

Wir woll'n es nicht verschweigen
in dieser Schweigezeit!
Das Grün bricht aus den Zweigen,
wir woll'n das allen zeigen,
dann wissen sie Bescheid.

We don't want to keep quiet about it
in this age of silence!
The greenery is bursting from the branches
we want to show that to everybody,
then they will understand.

== Background ==
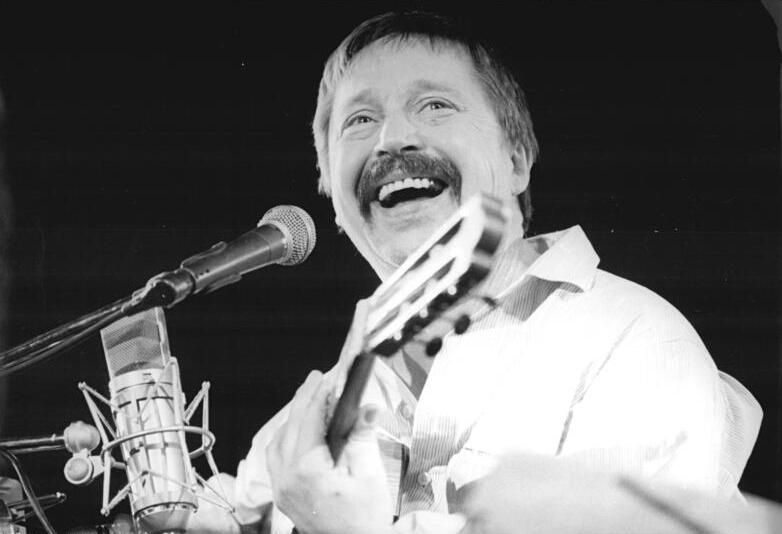
Wolf Biermann performing in Leipzig in 1989

Wolf Biermann dedicated the poem "Ermutigung" to his friend Peter Huchel. Since 1949, Huchel had been the editor in chief of the literary publication Sinn und Form, which enjoyed an international reputation as a platform for East German literature. His undogmatic views repeatedly brought him in conflict with the East German government, culminating in his forced resignation in 1962. For the following nine years, Huchel lived under surveillance by the Stasi, isolated in his house in Wilhelmshorst from much of the outside world aside from a small number of friends who were permitted to visit. He was forbidden from travel and his mail was confiscated; he was only allowed to emigrate in 1971. Andreas M. Reinhard described the poem as a "declaration of solidarity from the younger and stronger ... meant for the older and disillusioned".

After the publication of his book of poetry Die Drahtharfe (The Wire Harp) in 1965 through the West German publisher Verlag Klaus Wagenbach, Biermann had been forbidden from performing or publishing by the Central Committee of the Socialist Unity Party and described himself as having achieved the status of an "officially recognized enemy of the state" In a 1973 interview with Franz Hohler, he stated that did not write the song just for his friend and honorable colleague Peter Huchel, but "also for myself". After his forced emigration, he stated in an interview in 1981 "I wrote this red 'church song' as I myself was in danger of hardening. I had at first in East Germany not yet learned, under the hammer of being completely blacklisted, to conquer my distress with vital serenity."

== Structure and score ==
The poem consists of five verses. Aside from the first verse, all follow the rhyme scheme A–B–A–A–B. The rhythms have been compared by Birgit Lermen and Matthias Loewen to those of the earlier works of Bertolt Brecht, as well as the form of a Volkslied (folk song), where the simple and repetitive form contrasts with the subject of intellectual resignation. The simple style is at times both colloquial and epigrammatic. The first lines of the first four verses use the verbs verhärten, verbittern, erschrecken, and verbrauchen ("harden", "embitter", "terrify", and "wear down" respectively); each following line uses a word derived from the same root to describe the current times. The fifth and final verse breaks away from the repetitive form of the first four verses and the diction of the text becomes more encouraging.

Biermann's musical arrangement of "Ermutigung" alternates between a 4/4 and 2/4 time signature. Georg Friedrich Kühn noted that the equal emphasis on the quarter notes is reminiscent of a chorale work. Lermen and Loewen point to the lack of accents, such as lengthening or ironic emphasis throughout the first four verses; the rhythm only becomes more upbeat in the fifth and final verse. Thomas Rothschild observes that the key remains firmly in the Aeolian mode (natural minor scale), while the final chord changes to the subdominant chord of the parallel major scale. The rhythm provides a feeling of impatience and pressing forward, while the descending lines of the melody suggest a feeling of mourning. The final verse is sung a perfect fourth higher, leading to a more pressed tone of voice that emphasizes the metaphor of the budding green branches of a coming spring. The performance underscores the discrepancy between the clichéd image and the desperate wish for its fulfillment.

== Interpretation ==
Peter Rühmkorf summarized the content in Rezensentenprosa: "Whoever does not allow themselves to be worn down, embittered, hardened, or used will ultimately break free from the circle of terror, pressure, and racketeering to participate in a new comradely or community spirit." Rühmkorf highlights the allusion to Pentecost, which is typical for the religious allegories often found in Biermann's work, labeling the poem as "Good News".

Jürgen Haupt investigates in particular the role of nature, the winter metaphor of the "hard times", and the spring metaphor of the budding branches, with which Biermann wishes to give himself encouragement to survive the winter in resistance. He warns against an overly stark individuality, which has the danger of hardening and breaking, against the lack of prospects of subjectivism, as well as against isolated resignation. The poem evokes friendship with the familiar "Du" and the liberating "we" of solidarity in the community. The defiant and hopeful spring metaphor can be interpreted as a counterexample to the nature poetry of Peter Huchel, whose works take a drearier and elegiac tone.

Beate Pinkerneil considered the poem a celebration of "the art of living and survival", as it harkens back to Romantic poet Friedrich Hölderlin's resolution to bring "cheerfulness into suffering" from his novel Hyperion. The poem's plea is not to become accustomed to one's own unhappiness, but instead to resist any creeping embitterment and hardening with a "lighthearted confidence and cheerful composure in the middle of cemetery peace", delivered with the soft voice of subversive art and an "attestation of determined solidarity".

== Biermann in the Bundestag 2014 ==
Biermann appeared in the Bundestag on 7 November 2014 to perform the song in a memorial event 25 years after the fall of the Berlin Wall.
