= Sascha Anderson =

German writer and artist

Alexander "Sascha" Anderson (born 24 August 1953) is a German writer and artist who was an influential figure in the alternative scene in pre-unification East Berlin in the 1980s. Anderson was nicknamed "the culture minister" due to his role in organising cultural events and promoting young artists. In 1991, it was revealed that he had been an informal collaborator for the East German Stasi since 1975.

Anderson was born in Weimar in 1953 to a theatre director/actor father and architect mother. As an adult, he moved to Dresden where he trained as a typesetter and used his skills to print and disseminate political leaflets and poetry, for which he was imprisoned twice, in 1970 and 1972. Anderson's first reports to the Stasi came after his prison sentences. Anderson's code name was Fritz Müller

The East German secret police, known as the Stasi, had one of the most extensive and effective intelligence networks to have ever existed. By 1989, it was estimated there were at least 189000 informants in every sphere of East German society, and files on millions of citizens. By the late 1970s, the Stasi had moved from overt persecution to a programme of psychological harassment known as Zersetzung. The goal was the "fragmentation, paralysis, disorganization, and isolation of the hostile and negative forces, in order to preventatively impede the hostile and negative activities" of political opponents.

== Move to Berlin ==
In the 1960s Prenzlauer Berg had become a home to East German artists, intellectuals and the gay community; in the 1970s and 80s, the district was known as a "legendary Bohemia" which attracted artists like Cornelia Schleime and poets Adolf Endler and Bert Papenfuß-Gorek.

In 1976 Wolf Biermann, a prominent singer-songwriter in the scene, had his citizenship revoked while on a tour of West Germany; another member, philosopher Rudolf Bahro, was arrested and imprisoned in 1977 after he admitted having written The Alternative, a critique of East German socialism. These events triggered a wave of emigration in the counter-culture scene, and left what the ceramicist Wilfriede Maaß described as a "deep void".

Anderson moved from Dresden to Berlin in 1981, and based himself in the Prenzlauer Berg district. He has been described by those who knew him as "fascinating", "charismatic" and "an idol"; he immersed himself in the East Berlin alternative scene, became a singer in a punk band, and quickly gained a reputation as an organiser of cultural events. He arranged for the screening of films and publication of books and magazines, and found spaces for artists to work, perform and exhibit. For some time, he lived with Ekkehard and Wilfriede Maaß and their apartment and workshop became a meeting place for artists and bohemians. Ekkehard and Anderson held readings and exhibitions in their home, and it became a literary salon, attended by Heiner Müller, Christa Wolf, Volker Braun and Franz Fühmann. Allen Ginsberg and Yevgeny Yevtushenko also visited; it has been speculated that the well-known participants may have protected the gatherings from being persecuted by the Stasi.

In 1986, Anderson emigrated to West Germany, but continued organise cultural events in the East, and to report to the Stasi. While in West Berlin, he worked as a private secretary for A. R. Penck. Six months after he moved to the West, the Stasi opened a file on Anderson and may have been under surveillance even earlier.

In 1989, protests in East Germany culminated in the fall of the Berlin Wall. In a documentary in 2009, Anderson said, "It was incredibly exciting...it never crossed my mind that I was with the Stasi. I was there very quickly, standing on top of the wall. It was a beautiful feeling and I wanted to be part of it. I couldn’t stand by and watch it from afar." A friend recalls that Anderson swore at the sight of the open wall, although Anderson says he does not recall this.

== Exposure as an informant ==
In 1991, singer-songwriter Wolf Biermann was awarded the Georg Büchner Prize. During his acceptance speech, he made reference to a number of Stasi spies, including "the untalented babbler Sascha Arschloch [asshole]... who is still playing cool and hoping his files won't show up". The announcement caused immediate outcry amongst Anderson's friends and supporters; when asked by Schleime and Endler, he had repeatedly denied working as a spy.

The information provided to the Stasi by Anderson included "accurate and detailed psychograms of all artist friends" "No critical word, no rebellious eye, no precarious love had escaped" from the reports. He organised events, and then reported on them to the police. He also wrote about himself in his reports: in 1986, he wrote to the Stasi: "Sometimes I had the feeling that I am being paid to monitor myself". His reports were "precisely articulated and contained incriminating evidence against his fellow writers".

In interviews, Anderson has given a number of reasons for becoming an informant. In 2009, speaking in a documentary he answered:

How did you decide to be a spy?

In that situation someone comes and wants something from you and if you’re egotistical and altruistic enough then you say “Okay, let’s do it. I’ll do what I can and you’ll do what you can”. That’s fine. I’m not the sort of person who makes decisions based on an idea, so if the Devil looks good, I might say to him: “How can I help you, dear Devil?”

I sensed they wanted something from me. Someone is taking you seriously and listening to you. So I offered myself up. Every gap in the conversation was a chance for me to say: “I am the right man for you”

Were you a good spy?

[laughs]In the place that I was, I was the top informer. I had the feeling that I wasn’t just an ordinary spy. Of course, I told them everything.

He has commented that he wanted to be recruited as a "top spy" by the KGB and was surprised that he was not approached by them, and has described his relationship with Stasi officers as a father-son one. In another interview, he said "To me it's all the same...To me it meant nothing ... I had no moral problems. In 2019, he told another interviewer his motive was antifascism.

Before he was revealed as an informant, Anderson had received a number of prizes for his literary works including a residency at the Villa Massimo. Afterwards, he was ostracised by the literary community, and was described as "for a time... one of the most reviled men in Germany." When he took up the year-long Villa Massimo residency in 1993, other recipients refused to stay in the accommodation with him, and he ended up moving out of the villa for his stay in Rome. When Annekatrin Hendel's documentary Anderson – Anatomie des Verrats [Anderson – Anatomy of Betrayal] was released in 2014, there were protests at screenings.

In 1995 he faced charges relating to his work as an informant. He was acquitted, but received a fine. Since the dissolution of the Stasi in 1990, the Stasi Records Agency has worked to reassemble and organise the records held by the secret police and citizens have the right to request to see their own records. These documents have also been used to identify Stasi agents and informants. In 1999, Anderson's informant file was published

He has faced criticism for refusing to apologise or admit guilt for his actions; several critics have remarked that his published works seem to excuse or gloss over his collaboration. The literary scholar Peter Boethig named Anderson as one of the six most active informers of the literary salons held at the Maaß apartment.

Since the mid 1990s, he has lived in Frankfurt with the writer and artist Alissa Walser. where he has worked as a freelance typesetter and organised events for an investment bank.

== Writing ==
Anderson has published a number of books of poetry and an autobiographical novel. He is considered one of the most important poets of the German Democratic Republic, but many of his works have not been reprinted due to the controversy surrounding him.

His novel, published in 2002, was largely unsuccessful despite being launched in a series of well-attended promotional events. Many reviews were "dismissive and openly sarcastic" of the book.

He has since written under a pseudonym at the request of publishers, as they did not wish to be associated with his name.

A review of works re-evaluating GDR culture said that Anderson "incarnates everything abject about the East and its literary culture" and that Anderson has become "the projection of all of the small acts of betrayal and cowardice and accommodation that were required in the east".

== Works ==
- Anderson, Sascha; Kerbach, Ralf (1998). Jeder Satellit hat einen Killersatelliten (in German). Berlin: Edition Qwert zui opü von Egmont Hesse. ISBN 3-933149-08-8. OCLC 40364412.
- Anderson, Sascha; Kerbach, Ralf (1983). Totenreklame : eine Reise : Texte und Zeichnungen (in German). Berlin: Rotbuch. ISBN 3-88022-273-8. OCLC 10118919.
- Anderson, Sascha; Schleime, Cornelia; Kerbach, Ralf; Wildenhain, Michael (1984). Waldmaschine (in German). Berlin: Rotbuch. ISBN 3-88022-298-3. OCLC 12355231.
- Anderson, Sascha; Hessisches Landesmuseum; Verein der Freunde und Förderer des Hessischen Landesmuseums in Darmstadt (1985). Tiefe Blicke : Kunst der achtziger Jahre aus der Bundesrepublik Deutschland, der DDR, Österreich und der Schweiz (in German). Köln: DuMont. ISBN 3-7701-1740-9. OCLC 13356906.
- Anderson, Sascha; Leiberg, Helge (1985). O.T. Berlin: Ed. Mariannenpresse. ISBN 978-3-922510-27-7. OCLC 74773845.
- Anderson, Sascha; Ch'a, U-hŭi (1985). Ich fühle mich in Grenzen wohl 15 dt. Sonette (in German). Berlin. ISBN 978-3-922510-31-4. OCLC 311083939.
- Anderson, Sascha; Kerbach, Ralf (1988). Brunnen, randvoll (in German). Berlin: Rotbuch. ISBN 3-88022-727-6. OCLC 19052043.
- Anderson, Sascha; Penck, A. R. (1991). Jewish Jetset. Berlin: Galrev. ISBN 3-910161-08-1. OCLC 24937459.
- Anderson, Sascha; Penck, A. R. (1994). Rosa Indica vulgaris : Gedichte und ein Essay (in German). Berlin: Galrev. ISBN 3-910161-58-8. OCLC 31609396.
- Anderson, Sascha (1997). Herbstzerreissen : Gedichte (in German). Berlin: Edition Qwert Zui Opü. ISBN 3-910161-83-9. OCLC 39529371.
- Anderson, Sascha (2002). Sascha Anderson (in German). Köln: DuMont. ISBN 3-8321-5904-5. OCLC 49286523.
- Anderson, Sascha (2006). Crime sites : nach Heraklit : Gedichte, 1998-2005 (in German). Frankfurt am Main: Gutleut Verlag. ISBN 3-936826-61-7. OCLC 85691459.
- Anderson, Sascha (2006). Totenhaus : Novelle (in German). Frankfurt am Main: Gutleut Verlag. ISBN 3-936826-60-9. OCLC 111294462.
- Anderson, Sascha (2008). Da ist ... 33 Gedichte über Kunst oder Leben (in German). Frankfurt, M. ISBN 978-3-936826-45-6. OCLC 318218204.
- Anderson, Sascha (2019). So taucht Sprache ins Sprechen ein, um zu vergessen : Gedichte (in German). Frankfurt am Main. ISBN 978-3-86337-176-0. OCLC 1098038955.
