= Kakeibo =

Japanese method of money management

Kakeibo (Japanese: 家計簿, Hepburn: kakeibo) is a Japanese saving method. The term translates to "household ledger" and is meant for household financial management. Kakeibo varies in structure, but their principle remain the same. At the beginning of the month, the kakeibo user writes down the income and necessary expenses for the month ahead and decides some kind of savings target. Daily expenses are recorded and totaled at the end of each week and again at the end of the month. At the end of the month, a summary of the month's spending is written in the ledger. In addition to expenses and income, thoughts and observations are written in the ledger, with the aim of raising awareness of one's own consumption. A kakeibo can be a purchased book or self-made.

== History ==
Kakeibo was developed by the Japanese journalist Motoko Hani who published the first Kakeibo in a women's magazine in 1904.

== Basic concepts ==
The whole method revolves around four main questions:

- How much income?
- How much to save?
- How much is spent?
- How to improve?

Furthermore, expenses can be grouped into four categories:

- Essentials (e.g. food, clothes, rent)
- Non-essentials needs (e.g. takeout meals)
- Cultural (e.g. museum, books)
- Non-anticipated (e.g. health appointment)
