= Müllstation =

German punk band

- Origin: Eisleben, Sachsen-Anhalt, East Germany
- Genres: Deutschpunk
- Years active: 1980–1989, 1991-present (reunion)
- Labels: Höhnie Records, Nasty Vinyl, Trash Tape Rekords
- Members: (original members) Harty Sachse ("Steve Aktiv") (vocals); Volker Sachse (drums); Frank Baur (guitar); Susanne "Susi" Horn (bass)
- Past members: (Additional members); Volker Eschke (guitar); Mike Beelitz (guitar); Frank Baur (guitar); Ralf "Ralle" Brauer (drums); Roy Hoffmann (drums); Jürgen "Grahli" Grahl (drums) Maik Kunzmann) (bass); Hans-Martin Passauer (bass, sax) Frieder(bass); Melanie Stütz (bass); Alex Zschaege (bass)

Müllstation is a German punk band from the city of Eisleben in Saxony-Anhalt, East Germany. The band was founded 1980 in the German Democratic Republic (GDR) and now is one of the oldest, nearly continually active punk bands in East Germany.

After the fall of the Berlin Wall, Müllstation released three albums on cassette tape with the Rostock indie punk label Trash Tape Rekords. They have released five subsequent albums on Höhnie Records, a record label known in the German punk scene for releasing albums from Schleim-Keim, Namenlos, and Rasta Knast, among others. They have contributed to many punk samplers, including the 2004 Punk Rock BRD Volume 2 released by the well-known German punk label Weird System.

== History ==
Müllstation was founded in February, 1980 by brothers Harty Sachse ("Steve Aktiv") on vocals and Volker "Rolfo" Sachse on drums, along with their cousin Frank "Rialdo/Rio" Baur on guitar. The band members first played with pots as drums and a self-made guitar. Later Susanne "Susi" Horn joined the band on the bass, and Volker Eschke and Mike Beelitz both played in the band as guitarists.

During the 1980s, Müllstation used a practice room in the Christuskirche in Halle. Along with other East German underground bands like Schleim-Keim, Wutanfall (also known as L’Attentat), and Größenwahn, Müllstation performed in Christian churches in Halle.

In 1982, as part of a group of 12 East German youths, the band met two moderators from Norddeutscher Rundfunk (NDR) (Tim Renner und Thomas Meins) in front of the Palast der Republik in East Berlin. This meeting was the subject of an article in the music magazine "Sounds" titled "NDDW - Neue Musik aus der DDR - Die real existierende Welle" (English translation: "NDDW - New Music from the GDR - the real existing wave"). Following this meeting, Tim Renner took recordings from both Müllstation and Menschenschock (Volker Sachse's first band), with him to Hamburg. As a result of his efforts, Müllstation had their radio debut on September 20, 1982, on the West-German radio program "Club" that played on NDR 2. As a rare East German band played on West German radio, they became well known.

In a 1987 message for the radio program Parocktikum Steve Aktiv mentioned the West German DIY bands Der Moderne Man and Kosmonautentraum (both bands from Hannover) as musical influences, and the Müllstation also covered their songs.

In 1989 Müllstation broke up, only to have a reunion in 1990. After this reunion, Frank Baur took over on guitar, and Ralf "Ralle" Brauer joined the band as drummer. However Brauer was quickly replaced by Roy Hoffmann and then in 1995 by Jürgen "Grahli" Grahl on drums. At the end of the 1990s, Susi was replaced by Melanie Stütz on bass; since 2002, Alex Zschaege is the band's bass player. Their most recent studio album Anschlag was released by Höhnie Records in 2005.

== Discography ==
=== Studio albums ===
1. 1991: Punk lebt (cassette – Aggressive Punk Tapes)
2. 1991: Schrei Los! (cassette – Trash Tape Rekords)
3. 1991: Sei Dagegen! (cassette – Trash Tape Rekords)
4. 1991: Mach Mit (cassette – Trash Tape Rekords)
5. 1993: Wir sind dabei! (LP/CD – Höhnie Records)
6. 1994: 1977 (LP/CD – Höhnie Records)
7. 1996: Ratt'n' Roll gegen Altersfalten (CD – Höhnie Records)
8. 1998: Limitiert (split LP with Dog Food Five – Schlemihl Records)
9. 1999: Zeitbombe (LP/CD – Höhnie Records)
10. 2005: Anschlag (LP – Höhnie Records / CD – Impact Records)

=== Compilation albums ===
- 1989: We Are The Müllstation I (self-released)
- 1989: We Are The Müllstation II (Rat Tape Records)
- 1990: Plunder (Rat Tape Records)
- 2020: 40 Jahre Rattenpunk (Hörsturzproduktion)

=== Singles and EPs (selected) ===
- 1993: Punkrockkönig Vom Mansfelder Land (7" – Höhnie Records/Nasty Vinyl)
- 1993: Pogo Im VPKA (7" – Höhnie Records, Nasty Vinyl)
- 1994: Wünscht fröhliche Weihnacht überall (7" – Nasty Vinyl)
- 1995: Zeitsprung (EP – Trash Tape Rekords)
- 1999: Gut gekauft, gern gekauft (EP – Höhnie Records)
- 2000: Schläger in der Straßenbahn (EP – Schlemihl Records)
- 2000: Auf der Suche (EP – Steve Aktiv Records)
- 2002: Arbeitslos – Kein Geld – Keine Freude (EP – Höhnie Records)

=== Samplers (selected) ===
- 1992: Sicher Gibt Es Bessere Zeiten Doch Diese War Die Unsere (Höhnie Records)
- 1996: BRD Punk Terror Vol. 1 (CD – Nasty Vinyl)
- 1998: BRD Punk Terror Vol. 2 (CD – Nasty Vinyl)
- 1999: Auferstanden Aus Ruinen - Der Soundtrack Zur Wiedervereinigung (CD - Nasty Vinyl)
- 2004 Punk Rock BRD Volume 2 (CD – Weird System)
- 2005: BRD Punk Terror Vol. 6 (CD – Nasty Vinyl)
