= Bert Papenfuß =

German poet (1956–2023)

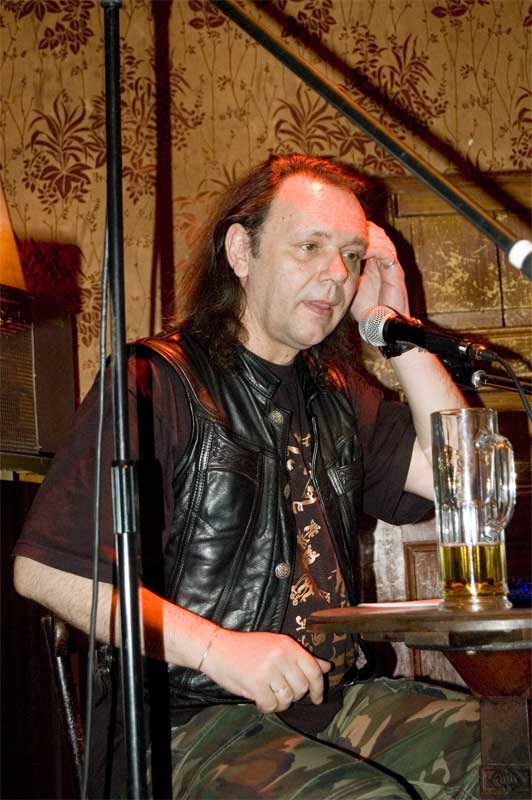
- Papenfuß-Gorek in 2007
- Born: January 11, 1956; Stavenhagen, Mecklenburg, East Germany
- Died: August 26, 2023 (aged 67)

Bert Papenfuß (also Bert Papenfuß-Gorek; 11 January 1956 – 26 August 2023) was a German poet.

== Biography ==
Papenfuß was a learned electrician and sound and lighting technician. After serving time in the East German army as a Bausoldat (construction soldier) he worked in theatre, first in Schwerin and from 1976 in Berlin. He belonged to the literature scene of Prenzlauer Berg that developed in the late 1970s, and had been a freelance writer since 1980. He collaborated with numerous artists and musicians, such as A. R. Penck and Tarwater.

From 1999 to 2009 he was co-owner of the Kaffee Burger club (famous for Wladimir Kaminer's Russendisko), where he coordinated the cultural programme Salon Brückenkopf. He was co-editor of the anarchistic magazine Gegner and the cultural magazine Zonic. He was co-owner of the culture café Rumbalotte Contiua, which opened its doors on 17 September 2010.

Papenfuß died of cancer on 26 August 2023, at the age of 67.

== Awards ==
- 1988 N.-C.-Caser-Prize
- 1991 F.-C.-Weiskopf-Prize
- 1996 Stadtschreiber zu Rheinsberg ("town Writer", or guest Writer, of Rheinsberg)
- 1998 Erich Fried Prize
- 2008 Eugen Viehof-Ehrengabe of the German Schiller Foundation

== Selected works ==
- harm. arkdichtung 77, KULTuhr Verlag, Berlin 1985.
- dreizehntanz, Aufbau-Verlag, Berlin und Weimar 1988.
- SoJa, (with drawings by Wolfram Adalbert Scheffler), Druckhaus Galrev, Berlin 1990.
- tiské (with drawings by A. R. Penck), Steidl Verlag, Göttingen 1990.
- vorwärts im zorn &sw. (with 7 graphics by Strawalde), Aufbau Verlag, Berlin 1990.
- led saudaus. notdichtung, karrendichtung (with drawings by the author), Janus press, Berlin 1991.
- routine in die romantik des alltags (with drawings by Helge Leiberg), Janus Press, Berlin 1995.
- Berliner Zapfenstreich: Schnelle Eingreifgesänge (with drawings by A.R. Penck), BasisDruck Verlag, Berlin 1996.
- SBZ - Land und Leute (with drawings by Silka Teichert), Druckhaus Galrev, Berlin 1998.
- Tanzwirtschaft. Ein angewandter Fortsetzungsroman, www.kaffeeburger.de, Berlin 2001
- Haarbogensturz. Versuche über Staat und Welt (with drawings by Tom Platt), BasisDruck Verlag, Berlin 2001.
- Rumbalotte. Gedichte 1998-2002, Urs Engeler Editor, Basel, Weil am Rhein und Wien 2005.
- Ation-Aganda: Gedichte 1983/1990 (with drawings by Ronald Lippok), Urs Engeler Editor, Basel, Weil am Rhein und Wien 2008.
