= Wolf Biermann =

German singer-songwriter (born 1936)

- Wolf Biermann at the Frankfurt Book Fair 2026

Background information
- Born: Karl Wolf Biermann; 15 November 1936 (age 90); Hamburg, Nazi Germany
- Genres: Folk music, political ballads
- Occupations: Singer-songwriter, poet, and dissident
- Years active: 1960–present
- Label: Broadside Records
- Website: wolf-biermann.de

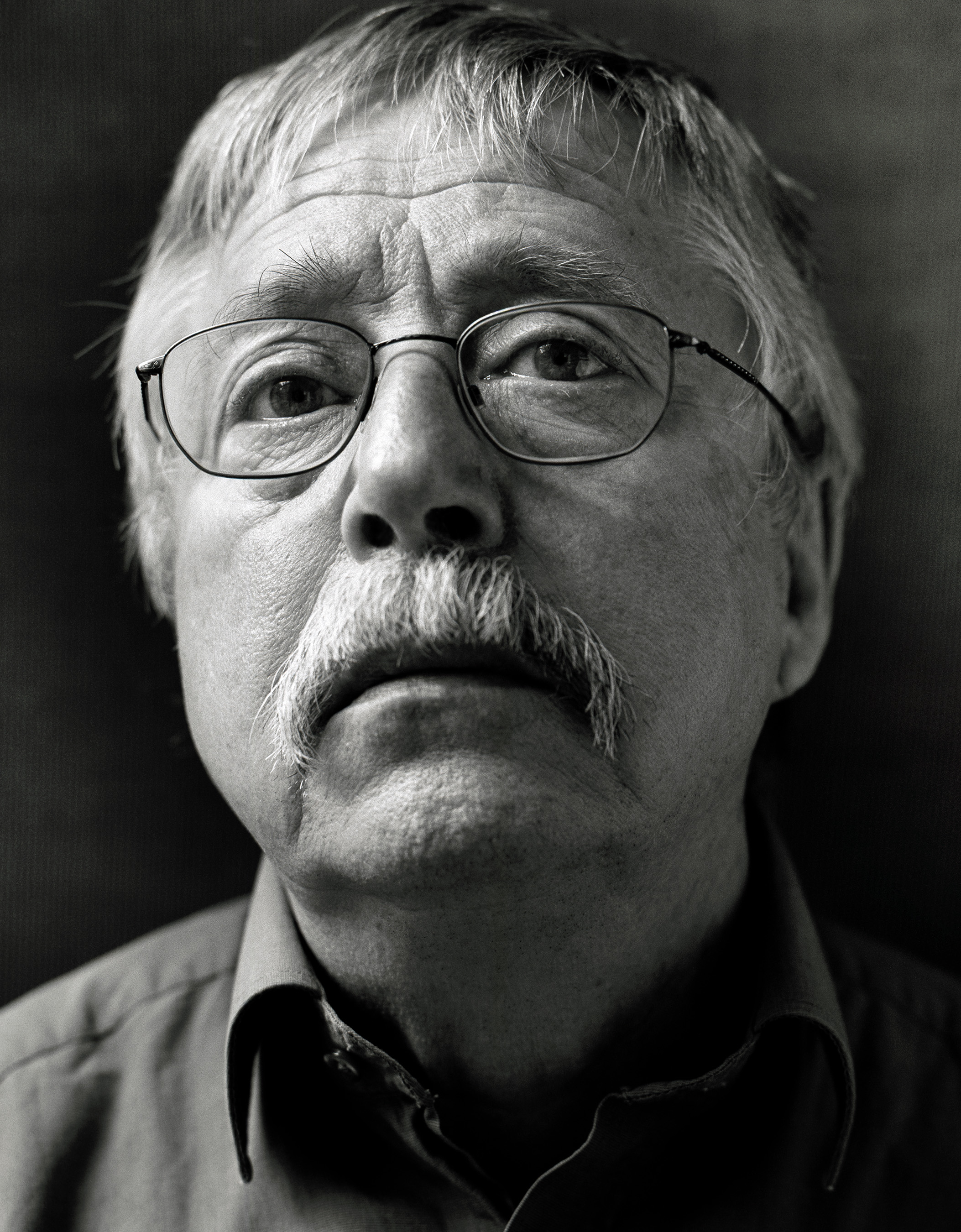
Wolf Biermann photographed by Oliver Mark, Hamburg 2007

Karl Wolf Biermann (German: [ˈvɔlf ˈbiːɐ̯ˌman]; born 15 November 1936) is a German singer-songwriter, poet, and former East German dissident. He is perhaps best known for the 1968 song "Ermutigung" and his expatriation from East Germany in 1976.

== Early life and education ==
Karl Wolf Biermann was born on 15 November 1936 in Hamburg, Germany. His mother, Emma (née Dietrich), was a German Communist Party activist, and his father, Dagobert Biermann, worked on the Hamburg docks. Biermann's father, a Jewish member of the German Resistance, was sentenced to six years in prison for sabotaging Nazi ships. In 1942, the Nazis decided to eliminate their Jewish political prisoners and Biermann's father was deported to Auschwitz concentration camp, where he was murdered on 22 February 1943.

Biermann was one of the few children of workers who attended the Heinrich-Hertz-Gymnasium (high school) in Hamburg. After the Second World War, he became a member of the Free German Youth (Freie Deutsche Jugend, FDJ) and in 1950, he represented the Federal Republic of Germany at the FDJ's first national meeting.

== East Germany ==
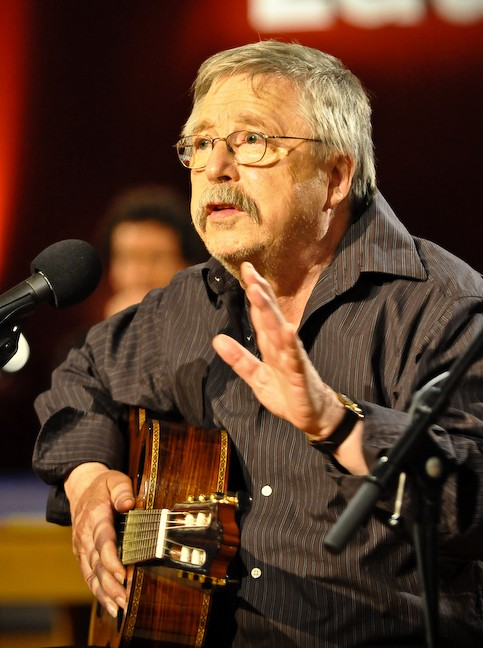
Biermann in 2008

Upon finishing school at the age of 17, Biermann emigrated from West to East Germany where he believed he could live out his Communist ideals. He lived at a boarding school near Schwerin until 1955, and then began studying political economics at the Humboldt University of Berlin. From 1957 to 1959, he was an assistant director at the Berliner Ensemble. At university he changed courses to study philosophy and mathematics under Wolfgang Heise until 1963, when he completed his thesis. Despite his successful defense of his thesis, he did not receive his diploma until 2008, when he was also awarded an honorary doctorate degree.

In 1960, Biermann met composer Hanns Eisler, who adopted the young artist as a protégé. Biermann began writing poetry and songs. Eisler used his influence with the East German cultural elite to promote the songwriter's career, but his death in 1962 deprived Biermann of his mentor and protector. In 1961, Biermann formed the Berliner Arbeiter-Theater ("Berlin Workers' Theater"), which was closed in 1963 before the production of Biermann's show Berliner Brautgang, which documented the building of the Berlin Wall. The play was officially banned and Biermann was forbidden to perform for six months.

Although a committed communist, Biermann's nonconformist views soon alarmed the East German establishment. In 1963, he was refused membership in the ruling Socialist Unity Party of Germany (SED), although no reason was given at the time for his rejection. After the Wende, documents available from Biermann's file at the Stasi Records Agency revealed that the reviewers were under the impression that he was a regular user of stimulants, leading to the rejection of his application.

In 1964, Biermann performed for the first time in West Germany. A performance in April 1965 in Frankfurt am Main on Wolfgang Neuss' cabaret program was recorded and released as an LP titled Wolf Biermann (Ost) zu Gast bei Wolfgang Neuss (West). Later that year, Biermann published a book of poetry, Die Drahtharfe, through the West German publisher Klaus Wagenbach. In December 1965, the Central Committee of the Socialist Unity Party of Germany denounced him as a "class traitor" and placed him onto the performance and publication blacklist. At this time Stasi developed a 20-point plan, “20-Punkte-Plan“, to "degrade" or discredit this person.

While blacklisted, Biermann continued to write and compose, culminating in his 1968 album Chausseestraße 131, recorded on equipment smuggled from the west in his apartment at Chausseestraße 131 in Mitte, the central borough of Berlin.

To break this isolation, artists including Joan Baez and many others visited him at his home during the World Festival of Youth and Students in 1973. Karsten Voigt, chairman of the West German Social Democratic Youth (Jusos), protested against the suppression of the freedom of opinion and information by the state security.

== Deprivation of citizenship ==
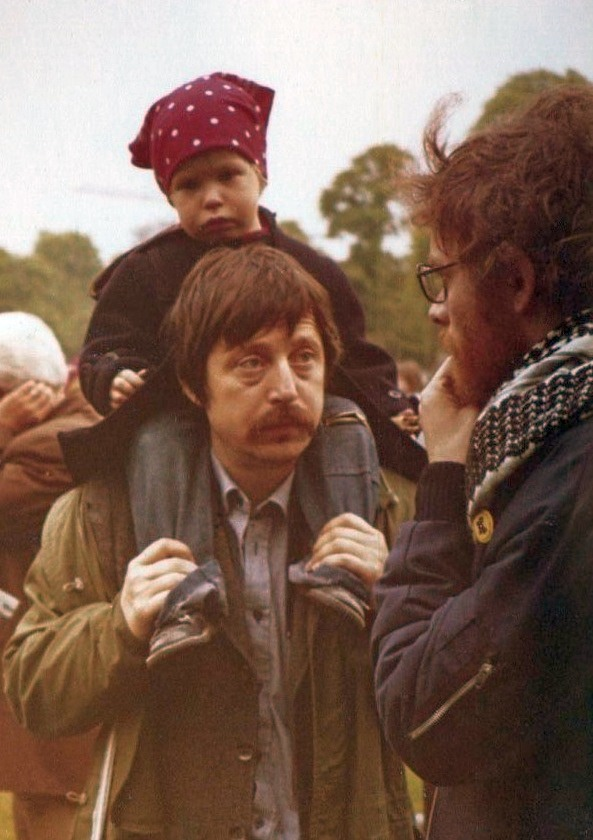
Biermann 1977 in Hamburg

In 1976, while Biermann was on an officially sanctioned tour of West Germany, the GDR government stripped him of his citizenship. He was not allowed to return to the GDR. Biermann's exile provoked protests by leading East German intellectuals, including actor Armin Mueller-Stahl and novelist Christa Wolf.

In 1977, he was joined in West Germany by his wife at the time, Christine Barg, as well as actress Eva-Maria Hagen, her daughter Catharina (Nina Hagen), and Sibylle Havemann, the daughter of Robert Havemann and mother of two of Biermann's children. In West Germany, his manager was the musician Diether Dehm, who was secretly a Stasi informer reporting on Biermann's activities to the GDR authorities.

== After moving to West Germany ==
Now living in the West, Biermann continued his musical career, criticizing East Germany's Stalinist policies. He was able to perform publicly again in East Germany on 1 and 2 December 1989 during the Wende that eventually toppled the Communist government. In 1998, he received the German national prize. He supported the 1999 NATO Kosovo War and the 2003 invasion of Iraq. In the Arab–Israeli conflict he supports Israel and is critical of the fact, as he sees it, that, under the influence of antisemitic views, a majority of Germans lack both understanding and empathy for the Israeli side. He signed a public petition by German artists to support Ukraine during the Russian invasion and demanded that the German government deliver weapons to support Ukraine. He lives in Hamburg and in France. He is the father of ten children, three of them with his second wife Pamela Biermann, née Rüsche.

== Awards ==
- 1969: Fontane-Preis der Stadt Berlin
- 1971: Jacques-Offenbach-Preis
- 1973: Deutscher Schallplattenpreis
- 1975: Deutscher Schallplattenpreis
- 1977: Deutscher Schallplattenpreis
- 1979: Deutscher Kleinkunstpreis for Chanson
- 1989: Friedrich-Hölderlin-Preis der Stadt Bad Homburg
- 1991: Mörike-Preis der Stadt Fellbach
- 1991: Georg Büchner Prize
- 1993: Heinrich-Heine-Preis der Stadt Düsseldorf
- 1998: Deutscher Nationalpreis
- 2001: Heinz-Galinski-Preis
- 2006: Joachim-Ringelnatz-Preis für Lyrik
- 2006: Großes Bundesverdienstkreuz
- 2007: Honorary citizen of Berlin
- 2008: Theodor-Lessing-Preis
- 2008: Honorary doctorate Humboldt University of Berlin
- 2017: Point-Alpha-Preis
- 2018: Ernst-Toller-Preis
- 2020: Honorary doctorate from the University of Koblenz-Landau
- 2025: Pour le Mérite for Sciences and Arts

== Selected works ==
- Wolf Biermann zu Gast bei Wolfgang Neuss (LP, 1965)
- Chausseestraße 131 (LP, 1969): recorded in his home in East Berlin, published in the West. Possessing home-recording charm, one can hear the noises from the streets. The German texts are very sarcastic, ironic, and to the point. This LP was recorded with a recorder smuggled in from West Germany and the title of the album was his address at the time, letting the political police know exactly who and where he was at the time.
- aah-ja! (LP, 1974)
