= List of anarcho-punk bands =

This is a list of anarcho-punk bands, including anarchist bands labelled as crust punk, D-beat, hardcore and folk punk.

== A ==
- Against All Authority
- Against Me!
- Amebix
- Anthrax
- Anti Cimex
- Antischism
- Antisect
- Anti-System
- The Apostles
- Aus-Rotten

== B ==
- Belgrado
- Bérurier Noir
- Blyth Power
- Bus Station Loonies

== C ==
- Chaos UK
- Chumbawamba
- Conflict
- Crass
- Crucifix

== D ==
- Destroy!
- Discharge
- Disorder
- Disrupt
- Dog Faced Hermans

== E ==
- The Ex

== F ==
- Flux of Pink Indians

== G ==
- Ghost Mice

== H ==
- Hagar the Womb
- Heart Attack
- Hellbastard
- Honey Bane

== I ==
- Icon A.D.
- Icons of Filth
- Instigators

== K ==
- Kronstadt Uprising

== L ==
- Lost Cherrees
- Les Sales Majestés

== M ==
- Mischief Brew
- The Mob
- Los Muertos de Cristo

== N ==
- Nausea
- Napalm Death (early)

== O ==
- Oi Polloi
- Omega Tribe

== P ==
- Poison Girls
- Political Asylum
- The Proletariat
- Propagandhi

== R ==
- Reagan Youth
- Ricanstruction
- RIOT 111
- Rubella Ballet
- Rudimentary Peni

== S ==
- Spitboy
- Straw Man Army
- Strike Anywhere
- Subhumans

== T ==
- Thatcher On Acid
- This Bike is a Pipe Bomb
- Toxic Waste

== U ==
- Ulrikes Dream

== V ==
- The Varukers

== W ==
- Włochaty
- Wolfbrigade

== Y ==
- Youth in Asia

== Z ==
- Zounds

== See also ==
- List of anarchist musicians

== Bibliography ==
- Furness, Zack (2010). One Less Car: Bicycling and the Politics of Automobility. Temple University Press. ISBN 978-1-59213-614-8.
- Glasper, Ian (2014). The Day the Country Died: A History of Anarcho Punk 1980–1984. PM Press. ISBN 978-1-60486-988-0.
- Roby, David (2013). Crust Punk: Apocalyptic Rhetoric and Dystopian Performatives (M.A.). Texas A&M University.
