= List of punk bands from the United Kingdom =

Punk rock bands originating in the United Kingdom.

== A ==
- Abdoujaparov
- Abrasive Wheels
- !Action Pact!
- Adam and the Ants
- The Adicts
- The Adverts
- Aftermath UK
- Alien Kulture
- Alternative TV
- Amazorblades
- Amebix
- Androids of Mu
- Angelic Upstarts
- Angletrax
- Yr Anhrefn
- Another Pretty Face
- Anthrax (UK)
- Anti-Establishment
- Anti-Nowhere League
- Anti-Pasti
- Anti System
- Antisect
- The APF Brigade
- The Apostles
- The Armoury Show
- The Art Attacks
- Ash
- Athletico Spizz 80

== B ==
- The Banned
- The Barracudas
- Big In Japan
- Blackhole
- The Blaggers/Blaggers ITA
- The Bleach Boys
- Blitz
- Blitzkrieg
- Blitzkrieg Bop
- The Blockheads
- Blunt Instrument
- Blyth Power
- Bok Bok
- Bollock Brothers
- The Boys
- Brian James and the Brains
- Broken Bones
- The Burial
- Jake Burns and the Big Wheel
- Bus Station Loonies
- The Business
- Buzzcocks

== C ==
- Capdown
- Cardiacs
- The Carpettes
- The Catholic Girls
- Celia & The Mutations
- Chameleons UK
- Chaos UK
- Chaotic Dischord
- The Chefs
- Chelsea
- China Drum
- The Chisel
- Chron Gen
- Chumbawamba
- Citizen Fish
- The Clash
- Cock Sparrer
- Cockney Rejects
- Combat 84
- Condemned 84
- Conflict
- The Cortinas
- Crass
- The Cravats
- Cult Maniax
- Culture Shock

== D ==
- The Damned
- Day 21
- Dead Men Walking
- Dead Swans
- Deaf School
- The Defects
- Demon Preacher
- Demob
- Desperate Bicycles
- Discharge
- Disorder
- The Distractions
- Doctors of Madness
- Dogsflesh
- The Doll
- Dolly Mixture
- Donna and the Kebabs
- Dr and The Crippens
- The Drones

== E ==
- Eater
- Eddie and the Hot Rods
- Eddie Mooney & The Grave
- Elton Motello
- Empire
- The Enemy
- English Dogs
- The Epileptics
- The Ethical Debating Society
- The Evening Outs
- Ex Pistols
- The Expelled
- The Exploited

== F ==
- The Fall
- Fatal Microbes
- The Featherz
- Fig.4.0
- The Fits
- Flag of Convenience
- Flamingo 50
- The Flowers Of Romance
- Flux of Pink Indians
- The Flying Brix
- The Flys
- Foreign Legion
- Frank Sumatra And The Mob
- Frantic Elevators
- The Freeze
- The Freshies

== G ==
- Gallows
- GBH
- Generation X
- Gnarwolves
- Goldblade
- The Gorillas
- Guns For Hire
- Guns n' Wankers
- The Gymslips

== H ==
- Hagar the Womb
- Thee Headcoats
- Thee Headcoatees
- Hooton 3 Car
- Huggy Bear

== I ==
- Icons of Filth
- The Idols
- The InCiders
- The Indestructible Beat
- Index
- Inner Terrestrials
- Innocent Vicars
- The Innocents
- Instigators

== J ==
- The Jam
- Janus Stark
- Jilted John
- John The Postman
- Johnny Moped
- The Jolt

== K ==
- The Killjoys
- King
- Kronstadt Uprising

== L ==
- Lambrini Girls
- Leatherface
- Leyton Buzzards
- Lightning Raiders
- Lockjaw
- London
- London SS
- London Zoo
- The Lords of the New Church
- Lost Cherrees
- The Lurkers

== M ==
- The Macc Lads
- The Magazine Spies (Mag/Spys)
- Maneaters
- Manufactured Romance
- Masters Of The Backsides
- Masterswitch
- Mega City Four
- The Mekons
- The Members
- The Membranes
- Mere Dead Men
- Thee Mighty Caesars
- Million Dead
- The Mob
- The Models
- The Molotovs
- The Monks
- The Moondogs
- The Moors Murderers
- Moskow

== N ==
- Neck
- Neo
- Neon Hearts
- New Hearts
- New Model Army
- The Newtown Neurotics
- Nipple Erectors/The Nips
- The Nosebleeds
- No Swastikas
- Not Sensibles
- The Now

== O ==
- O Level
- Oi Polloi
- Omega Tribe
- One Way System
- The Only Ones
- The Oppressed

== P ==
- The Pack
- Pardon Us
- The Partisans
- Pendleton
- Penetration
- Pete Stride & John Plain
- Peter and the Test Tube Babies
- Petrol Girls
- Phinius Gage
- Phones Sportsman Band
- Picture Frame Seduction
- The Pigs
- The Piranhas
- The Plague
- The Planets
- The Poems
- Poison Girls
- Political Asylum
- Pop Rivets
- Pork Dukes
- The Prats
- The Prefects
- The Press
- Pressure
- The Professionals
- Public Disturbance
- Puncture
- Pussycat and the Dirty Johnsons
- PVC2

== R ==
- Rabid
- Radio Blank
- Rancid Hell Spawn
- Raped
- Red Alert
- Red Flag 77
- Red London
- Red Monkey
- The Rejects
- The Resiztors
- The Restarts
- The Revillos
- The Rezillos
- Rhythm Clicks
- The Rich Kids
- Riff Raff
- Rikki and the Last Days of Earth
- The Rings
- Riot Squad
- Ritual
- The Rivals
- Rubella Ballet
- Rudi
- Rudimentary Peni
- Ruefrex
- The Ruts
- Ruts DC

== S ==
- Satan's Rats
- Schwartzeneggar
- Screaming Dead
- Senseless Things
- Serious Drinking
- Sex Aids
- Sex Pistols
- Sham 69
- The Shapes
- Siouxsie and the Banshees
- The Skids
- Skrewdriver
- Slaughter & The Dogs
- The Slits
- The Smirks
- The Snivelling Shits
- Snuff
- Sounds of Swami
- Sore Throat
- Special Duties
- The Speedometors
- The Spitfire Boys
- Spizz Oil
- Spizzenergi
- The Spizzles
- Splodgenessabounds
- The Starjets
- The Steal
- Stiff Little Fingers
- The Sting-rays
- The Stranglers
- The Straps
- Stratford Mercenaries
- Studio Sweethearts
- The Stupids
- Subhumans
- Suburban Studs
- Subway Sect
- Swell Maps

== T ==
- The
- The Table
- Tagmemics
- Tango Brigade
- Tanz Der Youth
- The Teardrops
- Television Personalities
- Tenpole Tudor
- Thatcher on Acid
- The Tights
- The Toilets
- Tom Robinson Band
- Towers Of London
- Toxik Ephex
- Toxic Waste
- Toy Dolls
- Toyah
- The Transmitters
- Tubeway Army
- T.V. Smith's Explorers

== U ==
- UK Subs
- The Undertones
- The Unwanted
- Urban Dogs
- The Users

== V ==
- The Valves
- The Vandals (UK)
- The Vapors
- The Varukers
- The Vibrators
- The Vicars
- The Vice Creems
- Vice Squad
- Vicious White Kids
- Victim
- Victimize
- Voorhees

== W ==
- The Wailing Cocks
- The Wall
- The Wanderers
- Wasted Youth
- Wat Tyler
- Wire
- Wreckless Eric

== X ==
- The X-Certs
- X-Ray Spex

== Y ==
- The Yobs
- Your Demise
- Youth in Asia

== Z ==
- The Zeros
- The Zones
- Zounds

== See also ==
- List of punk rock bands, 0–K
- List of punk rock bands, L–Z
- List of post-punk bands
- List of new wave artists
- List of anarcho-punk bands
- List of riot grrrl bands
