= List of anarchist musicians =

The following is a list of anarchist musicians, which details the instruments such musicians use, musical genres they perform, and, if applicable, bands they are members of.

An anarchist is a person who rejects formalized hierarchy and supports its elimination. Anarchism is a political philosophy that advocates self-governed societies with voluntary institutions. This list only deals with individual, self-identified anarchists who are musicians. Musicians who have not self-identified as anarchists are not included; nor are bands and music collectives who collectively identify as anarchist, although individual members thereof may be.

== A ==
- Jude Abbott: English singer; performs punk rock; member of anarcho-punk band Chumbawamba (1996–2012)
- Sid Ation: English drummer; performs punk rock; former member of Flux Of Pink Indians
- Sherman Austin (1983–present): American rapper; performs hip hop music

== B ==
- Louise Bell: English guitarist; performs punk rock; former member of Flux Of Pink Indians
- Pascal Benvenuti (1980–present): French singer and bass, guitar, drums, ukulele, mandolin, and concertina player; performs jazz punk and folk punk music; current member of Les Louise Mitchels and occasional member of anarcho-punk/folk punk band Ghost Mice (2002–present)
- Derek Birkett: English bassist; performs punk rock; former member of Flux Of Pink Indians
- Björk: Icelandic singer-songwriter; prominent purveyor of art pop; involved in anarcho-punk and anarchist poetry during the 1980s; aligned with the anarchist Crass Collective as part of post-punk group KUKL; signed to One Little Indian since the 1980s, set up by members of various anarcho-punk bands.
- Johnny Blackburn: English bassist; performs punk rock; member of anarcho-punk band Omega Tribe
- Georges Brassens (1921–1981): French singer, songwriter, and guitarist; performed folk music
- Bob Brozman (8 Mar 1954 – 23 Apr 2013): American blues and world guitarist and ethnomusicologist; described himself in an OC-TV program as a "guitarist, anarchist, anthropologist"
- Dunstan Bruce: English singer; performs punk rock; member of anarcho-punk band Chumbawamba
- Graham Burnett (1960–present): English drummer; performed punk rock and post-punk; former member of Stripey Zebras (1980–1981), Autumn Poison (1980–1985), and Love Over Law

== C ==
- John Cage (1912–1992): American composer; composed chance and experimental music
- Neil Campau (1980–present): American guitarist, autoharpist, and singer; former member of World History and current member of Electrician
- Daniel Carter (1945–present): American saxophonist, flautist, clarinetist, and trumpeter; performs free jazz
- Pat Carter: English vocalist; performs punk rock; member of anarcho-punk band Omega Tribe
- Holger Czukay (1938–2017): German composer and bassist; performs krautrock and experimental music; member of the "anarchist community" Can

== D ==
- Lance D'Boyle: English drummer; performed punk rock; former member of Poison Girls (??–1995)
- Fabrizio De Andre (1940–1999): Italian singer-songwriter
- Mavis Dillon: English trumpeter; performed punk rock; former member of anarcho-punk band Chumbawamba (–1995)
- Peter Dolving: Swedish vocalist; performed thrash metal; member of thrash metal band The Haunted
- Emmett Doyle: American folk/folk-punk singer-songwriter, former member of the Wooden Shoe Ramblers.

== E ==
- Robert Eggplant
- Andrew Eldritch: English singer; performs gothic rock; frontman of The Sisters of Mercy; describes himself as "traditionally a Labour supporter" despite his "anarcho-syndicalist tendencies".
- Dave Ellesmere: English drummer; performs punk rock; former member of Flux Of Pink Indians

== F ==
- Richard Famous: English singer and guitarist; performed punk rock; former member of Poison Girls (1978–1995)
- Neil Ferguson: English bassist and audio engineer; performs punk rock; member of Chumbawamba
- Léo Ferré (24 August 1916 – 14 July 1993): French singer-songwriter, poet, composer, orchestra conductor and pianist; one of France's most well-known and influential singers; a self-proclaimed anarchist who sang irreverent and highly confrontational songs
- Phil Free: English guitarist; performed punk rock, hardcore punk, and art punk; former member of anarcho-punk band Crass
- Sheena Fulton: English singer; performed punk rock and post-punk; former member of Stripey Zebras (1980–1981) and Autumn Poison (1980–1985)

== G ==
- Patricio García (28 Oct 1977–present): Argentinian composer; former member of rock band Los Chicles (1995–2002), writes music for film.
- Laura Jane Grace (8 Nov 1980–present): American guitarist and vocalist of punk rock band Against Me!
- Graham: English drummer; performs punk rock; former member of anarcho-punk band The Mob (1979–1983)
- Eric Green (19 January 1993–present): American guitarist and vocalist for California-based emo/post-hardcore band Problem Dog. Previously a member of anarcho-punk/folk punk band Danny Discord and the Misanthropists (2012–2015).

== H ==
- Travid Halton; Houston singer-songwriter a.k.a. Jacob Hilton
- Harry Hamer: English drummer; performs punk rock; member of anarcho-punk band Chumbawamba
- Gene Hugh: English guitarist; performs punk rock; member of anarcho-punk band Omega Tribe
- Kevin Hunter: English guitarist; performs punk rock; former member of Flux Of Pink Indians
- Andy Hurley: American drummer; performs pop-punk, hardcore, crust-punk, grindcore; member of pop-punk band Fall Out Boy

== I ==
- Steve Ignorant: English singer; performed punk rock, hardcore punk, and art punk; former member of anarcho-punk bands Crass, Schwartzeneggar, Stratford Mercenaries, Current 93, Thought Crime and Paranoid Visions

== J ==
- Darren Johns: British singer, guitarist, lyricist and composer; performs punk rock, Americana and folk-roots; current member of Crazy Arm (2005–present) and Warshy (2017–present).
- Chris Johnston ("Chris Clavin"): American guitarist, singer, and harmonicist; performs pop punk and folk punk music; former member of pop-punk band The Devil Is Electric (2000–2003); current member of anarcho-punk/folk punk band Ghost Mice (2002–present)
- Hannah Jones: American violinist and singer; performs pop punk and folk punk music; former member of pop-punk band The Devil Is Electric (2000–2003) and current member of anarcho-punk/folk punk band Ghost Mice (2002–present)

== K ==
- Michael Karoli (1948–2001): German guitarist and violinist; performed krautrock and experimental music; former member of the "anarchist community" Can
- Tim Kelly: English guitarist; performs punk rock; former member of Flux Of Pink Indians
- Ian "Lemmy" Kilmister (1945–2015): English singer, bassist, guitarist, and harmonicist; performs Rock 'N' Roll, space rock, and punk rock; has associated with various acts, including Motörhead, Hawkwind, Ramones, and The Rockin' Vickers
- Tuli Kupferberg (1923-2010): American countercultural poet, cartoonist and co-founder of proto-punk band The Fugs.

== L ==
- Nomy Lamm (1976–present): American singer-songwriter; performs punk rock, and queercore; liner notes of her debut album, Anthem, state that she is an anarchist
- Colin Latter: English singer; performs punk rock; former member of Flux Of Pink Indians
- Eve Libertine: English singer; performed punk rock, hardcore punk, and art punk; former member of anarcho-punk band Crass
- Yegor Letov (1964–2008): Russian experimental musician and singer-songwriter; performed post-punk and psychedelic rock; founder and leader of the band Grazhdanskaya Oborona; adherent of green anarchism as stated in 2007 interview
- Jaki Liebezeit (1939–2017): German drummer; performs free jazz, krautrock and experimental music; member of the "anarchist community" Can, who suggested the backronym "communism, anarchism, nihilism" for the band's name
- Austin Lunn: American vocalist, guitarist and drummer; sole member of the band Panopticon, and has also been a member of several other bands as various roles.

== M ==
- Andy Martin
- Terence McKenna: ethnobotanist and philosopher; spoken word on Alien Dreamtime with Spacetime Continuum & Stephen Kent
- Efrim Menuck: Canadian guitarist and singer involved with the bands Godspeed You! Black Emperor and Thee Silver Mt. Zion Memorial Orchestra
- Simon Middlehurst: English guitarist; performs punk rock; former member of Flux Of Pink Indians
- Misantroop: Dutch multi-instrumentalist (guitar, bass, percussion, kazoo) who plays acoustic anarcho-punk
- Marc Mob: English guitarist and singer; performs punk rock; former member of anarcho-punk band The Mob (1979–1983)

== N ==
- Nikolas Asimos (20 August 1949 – 17 March 1988): Greek composer and singer
- Nil Wright English (1952–present): bassist and electric violinist; performed punk rock; former member of Poison Girls (1980–1995)
- Danbert Nobacon (1958–present): English singer and keyboardist; performs punk rock and folk rock; former member of anarcho-punk band Chumbawamba
- Eirik Norheim: Norwegian vocalist and bassist; performs black metal and hardcore punk; former member of black metal band Mayhem.
- Alice Nutter: English singer and percussionist; performs punk rock; former member of anarcho-punk band Chumbawamba

== O ==
- Joey Only: guitarist and singer; performs folk punk music

== P ==
- N. A. Palmer: English guitarist; performed punk rock, hardcore punk, and art punk; former member of anarcho-punk band Crass
- Pat "The Bunny" Schneeweis: American singer-songwriter, guitarist, and trumpet player; Formerly lead anarcho-punk/folk groups Johnny Hobo and the Freight Trains, Wingnut Dishwashers Union, and Ramshackle Glory, as well as a solo career. Retired from music in February 2016, due to a change in ideologies
- Peste Noire: French black metal band. La Sale Famine de Valfoutre classifies himself as a "right-wing anarchist" or national anarchist.
- Erik Petersen: singer-songwriter, and guitarist for Philadelphia anarcho-punk band Mischief Brew
- Utah Phillips (1935–2008): American singer, poet, storyteller and guitarist; performed folk music and spoken word; retired on 11 October 2007, due to poor health, before dying on 23 May 2008
- Matty Pop Chart: American accordionist and drummer; performs folk punk music; occasional member of anarcho-punk/folk punk band Ghost Mice (2002–present)
- Josef Porta: English guitarist, drummer, and singer; performs punk rock; former member of anarcho-punk band The Mob (1979–1983), Blyth Power (1983–present), and Zounds (1977–1982, 2001–present)
- Promoe (1976–present): Swedish rapper; performs hip hop; member of rap group Looptroop
- Neil Puncher: English guitarist; performs punk rock; former member of Flux Of Pink Indians

== R ==
- Bernhardt Rebours: English bassist, synthesizer player, and pianist; performed punk rock; former member of Poison Girls (??–1995)
- Wesley Richards: American singer-songwriter and guitarist; writes and performs with the anarcho-metal band Fortunate Fall (band) and also with the anarcho-punk band Dr. Ghost
- Lily Richeson: American cellist; performs folk punk music; occasional member of anarcho-punk/folk punk band Ghost Mice (2002–present)
- Penny Rimbaud: English drummer; performed punk rock, hardcore punk, and art punk; former member of anarcho-punk band Crass
- Zack de la Rocha, vocalist of Rage Against the Machine. Performs Hip Hop, Rock, Nu Metal, Punk Rock, Metal
- David Rovics (1967–present): American singer-songwriter and guitarist; performs folk music

== S ==
- Chicho Sánchez Ferlosio (1940–2003): Spanish anti-Francoist singer-songwriter whose politics moved from communism to anarchism.
- Irmin Schmidt (1937–present): German keyboardist; plays krautrock and experimental music and composes film scores; member of Can who described the group as an "anarchist community"
- Pete Seeger: had many anarchist and communist beliefs
- Otep Shamaya (1979–present): American metal musician, singer-songwriter and lyricist/poet
- Sturgill Simpson: American Country music Singer-Songwriter
- Andy Smith: English guitarist; performs punk rock; former member of Flux Of Pink Indians
- Sole: American rapper and producer
- Vi Subversa (1935–2016): English singer-songwriter, and guitarist; performed punk rock; former member of Poison Girls (1978–1995)

== T ==
- Scott Thomas: English drummer; performs punk rock; member of anarcho-punk band Omega Tribe
- Tõnu Trubetsky (1963–present): Estonian singer and poet; performs punk rock; member of punk band Vennaskond
- Kevin Tucker: American vocalist and guitarist of the anarcho-primitivist death metal band Peregrine

== V ==
- Gee Vaucher: English pianist; also created album cover art and stage montages; performed punk rock, hardcore punk, and art punk; former member of anarcho-punk band Crass
- Joy De Vivre: English singer; performed punk rock, hardcore punk, and art punk; former member of anarcho-punk band Crass

== W ==
- Glenn Wallis: Founder and guitarist for Ruin; author of An Anarchist's Manifesto.
- Jason Walsh: English guitarist; performs punk rock; member of anarcho-punk band Omega Tribe
- Lou Watts: English singer and keyboardist; performs punk rock; member of anarcho-punk band Chumbawamba
- Dorian Wallace (1985–present): American composer and pianist.
- Greg Wells: American vocalist (described as "howling and breathing"); performs folk punk music; occasional member of anarcho-punk/folk punk band Ghost Mice (2002–present)
- Boff Whalley: English guitarist and singer; performs punk rock and folk; member of anarcho-punk band Chumbawamba and founding member of Commoners Choir.
- Chris Willsher (1971–present): English drummer, singer, songwriter; performs punk rock; member of Bus Station Loonies and former member of Oi Polloi and Disorder
- Martin Wilson: English drummer; performs punk rock; former member of Flux of Pink Indians
- Pete Wright: English bassist and singer; performed punk rock, hardcore punk, and art punk; former member of anarcho-punk band Crass

== Y ==
- Gino Srdjan Yevdjevich: former Yugoslav vocalist of gypsy punk band Kultur Shock
- Curtis Youé: English bassist; performs punk rock; former member of anarcho-punk band The Mob (1979–1983) and Blyth Power (1983–??)

== Z ==
- ZSK: German punk-rock band

== See also ==
- List of anarcho-punk bands
- List of crust punk bands
- Music and politics
