= Youth in Asia =

British anarcho-punk band

- Origin: London, England
- Genres: Anarcho-punk
- Years active: 1981–1984
- Past members: Kay Byatt; Mark; Wayne Preston; Punky Pete; Olga; Eddie; Lou; Mick Clarke; Bernie

Youth in Asia were an early 1980s UK anarcho-punk band from London. They were differentiated from many other bands within that scene by their prominent use of the synthesizer. The band's first live performance was in Brussels in December 1981. They played several gigs at squatted venues, including Crass's squat gig at Zig Zag in London, and the Wapping Autonomy Centre with other bands including The Apostles, Crass, Flux of Pink Indians, Twelve Cubic Feet, The Mob, Poison Girls, Hagar the Womb, Riot/Clone, DIRT and others.

The band sang political lyrics about issues such as war, sexism and state terrorism. The band's name was a play on the word euthanasia.

The initial line-up was Kay Byatt (vocals), Mark Edmondson (guitar), Wayne Preston (bass guitar), Punky Pete (drums), and Olga Ashworth (vocals/keyboards). Pete was soon replaced by Eddie on drums, and Lou, formerly of The Witches joined on rhythm guitar. In 1983, Eddie and Lou both left the band with Mick Clarke and Bernie, both previously of Windsor's Disease, replacing them. The new line-up recorded a single for Crass Records, but the band split up before it was released, with some of the members forming a new band, Decadent Few.

Byatt later sang with Radical Dance Faction and The Astronauts. Byatt has been the primary lyricist and vocalist for Ramsgate-based anarcho-goth band Punk Con Fusion since 2012.

== Band members ==
- Kay Byatt – vocals
- Eddy – drums
- Olga Orbit – vocals, synthesizer
- Wayne Sultana – bass
- Stigmata – guitar, synthesizer
- Lou – guitar
- William Kolar – flute

== Discography ==
They released one cassette album entitled Sex Object on Millennium tapes (1983). They also had their song "Power and the Glory" included on Volume II of the Crass Records Bullshit Detector compilation series. "When the Wind Blows", from the band's final recording session, was included on the Overground compilation Anti-War, Anarcho-Punk Compilation Volume One.

=== Sex Object track list ===
1. C.B.S. (Cash Before Sincerity)
2. Paper Love
3. Power and the Glory
4. They Shoot Children Don't They?
5. Blind Reality
6. Victim of Rape
7. How They Live
8. Armygigolo Time
9. Happy Families
10. Sunday Bloody Sunday
11. Lady Madonna
