= Straw Man Army =

American musical group

- Origin: Brooklyn, New York
- Genres: Punk rock; anarcho-punk; post-punk
- Years active: 2018–present
- Labels: D4MT Labs Inc. (U.S.); La Vida Es Un Mus (Europe); Stucco Soundtracks
- Members: Owen Deutsch; Sean Fentress

Straw Man Army is a punk rock duo based in Brooklyn, New York. The band has released four albums since their founding in 2018.

== History ==
The duo first met in high school in Chicago and formed Straw Man Army in 2018. Their first album, Age of Exile, was released in October 2020. Its lyrics address the legacy of U.S. colonialism, and the band donated the profits from album sales to The Red Nation, a Native American advocacy group.

In 2021, Straw Man Army recorded a soundtrack for Her Majesty's Ship, an experimental 2019 film based on Charles Darwin's 1839 memoir The Voyage of the Beagle.

Their 2022 album SOS was named by The Washington Post, NPR, and Bandcamp as one of the best albums of the year. The band donated profits from sales of SOS to Roots Unbound, a prison abolition nonprofit.

Their 2024 album Earthworks was met with continued critical acclaim, being named to several year-end lists. Straw Man Army has stated that Age of Exile, SOS, and Earthworks are intended as a trilogy focused on the past, present, and future, respectively.

== Musical style and influences ==
Straw Man Army is known for its DIY ethic, its politically charged lyrics, and its experimental use of ambient sound. The band's anarcho-punk musical style incorporates elements of psychedelic rock, krautrock, and jazz. Straw Man Army shares members with D4MT labelmates Kaleidoscope and Tower 7.

Fentress and Deutsch have described CAN, the Ventures, and the Apostles as some of their biggest influences. Critics have compared the band to Wire, the Ex, Zounds, This Heat, and Crass, while also noting its "sparse, driven" sound that resists easy categorization.

== Discography ==
=== Studio albums ===
- Age of Exile (2020) (D4MT Labs Inc.)
- SOS (2022) (D4MT Labs Inc., La Vida Es Un Mus)
- Earthworks (2024) (D4MT Labs Inc., La Vida Es Un Mus)
- True North (2026) (D4MT Labs Inc., La Vida Es Un Mus)

=== Soundtracks ===
- Her Majesty's Ship OST (2021) (Stucco Soundtracks)

=== Singles ===
- "Extinction Burst" (2024)
- "Look Alive" (2024)
- "Striking Home" (2026)

== See also ==
- List of anarcho-punk bands
- La Vida Es Un Mus
