= Hagar the Womb =

English punk rock band

- Origin: London, England
- Genres: Punk rock Anarcho-punk
- Years active: 1980–1986; 2011–present
- Labels: Mortarhate Records; Abstract Sounds; Mississippi Records; All The Madmen Records
- Members: Ruth Elias; Karen Amsden; Lorna Tiefholz; Paul Harding; Mitch Flacko; Mike Howe
- Past members: Janet Nassim; Paul "Veg" Venables; Elaine Reubens; Julie Sorrell; Nicola Corcoran; Jon "From Bromley" Atwood, Chris ‘Liberator’ Knowles, Steph Cohen

Hagar the Womb are an English punk rock band, originally active in the early 1980s and part of the anarcho-punk movement. In hiatus from 1987, members went on to form We Are Going To Eat You and Melt, with vocalist Julie Sorrell. A 2011 compilation of their back catalogue brought members back into contact with each other, and invitations to reform and play gigs and festivals led to Hagar The Womb gigging again from 2012. The band released an EP in 2016.

== History ==
The band was formed in London in 1980, in the Wapping Anarchy Centre, established by the efforts of seminal anarchist bands Crass and Poison Girls.The Autonomy Centre became an important focal point for the anarcho-punk anti-capitalist movement in the UK and Europe, bringing together anarchists who participated in protests and direct action against targets such as vivisection laboratories, the meat industry and the policies of then Prime Minister Margaret Thatcher. The Kill Your Pet Puppy anarchist collective organised events. Some of the bands that regularly played at the centre included Anthrax, The Apostles, Chris Knowles' (later Chris Liberator) Cold War, Conflict, and Rudimentary Peni. Funds were raised from a benefit single, Persons Unknown by Poison Girls and Bloody Revolutions by Crass. The original line-up of Hagar the Womb was all-female, reflecting the band's purpose of giving women a voice in the anarcho-punk scene: Ruth Elias (vocals), Karen Amsden (vocals), Nicola Corcoran (vocals), Janet Nassim (guitar), and Steph Cohen (bass guitar). One week after forming they played their first gig with Zounds and The Mob, with "Scarecrow" aka Hooligan Rocker playing drums. They soon recruited a second guitarist, "Jon From Bromley", and a permanent drummer, Chris Knowles, formerly of Cold War. Prior to joining Hagar the Womb, Chris Knowles had already recorded the dystopian single "The Machinist/Illusion" with Cold War, playing bass and providing vocals, creating a sound akin to the work of Antisect and Amebix. A rare demo tape of Chris Knowles' work with Cold War exists, containing music that still remains unreleased. Corcoran left, leaving two vocalists. The band's first demo included the track "For the Ferryman", which was released on the Mortarhate label compilation LP Who? What? Why? When? Where? in 1984. Cohen was replaced by Mitch Flacko (also of The Mekons) prior to the band's first release proper. The band toured the UK punk circuit for five years, releasing two 12-inch EPs and recording a Peel Session for BBC Radio 1 on 11 February 1984.

Their first EP, The Word of the Womb, was produced by Pete Fender (son of Vi Subversa and guitarist in Honey Bane's Fatal Microbes) and released on Conflict's Mortarhate label, which was a hit on the UK Indie Chart during 1984, peaking at number six, and staying in the chart for more than five months. Elaine Reubens joined the band in time for the recording of their Peel session.

The band released a second EP, Funnery In a Nunnery (UK Indie No. 9) the next year, now on the Abstract label, drawing comparisons with Siouxsie & the Banshees, Delta 5 and The Slits. Flacko left, his replacement being Paul "Veg" Venables, and Julie Sorrell was brought in to replace Amsden.

They continued for another year, but there were no further releases and the band split up, with Knowles, Sorrell, Venables, and Harding forming We Are Going To Eat You, who signed to Junior Delgado's Big Cat Records (who later became Jungle Records) after their 1987 début EP and went on to release the album Everywhen in 1990. They later changed their name to Melt, releasing a sole EP before splitting up.

The band's drummer Chris Knowles (a notable figure in the Stamford Hill punk rock anarchist squatting scene in the 1980s) has a degree in Hegelian Dialectics, Continental Philosophy and Russian Literature and went on to become a cult acid techno producer and DJ under the moniker Chris 'Liberator'. Bassist Mitch Flacko has been playing bass in avant garde ensembles, and works as a tour manager.

== Line-up ==
During its lifetime the band's line-up fluctuated regularly, but often included:

- 'Scarecrow', aka Hooligan Rocker ( drums )
- Ruth Elias aka Ruth Rack or The Hon. Ruthless Savage (Vocals)
- Karen Amsden a.k.a. The Karennipoo or Miss K. Penfold (Vocals)
- Elaine Reubens a.k.a. Illayne Illhabopp (Vocals)
- Julie Sorrell (Vocals)
- Jon Attwood a.k.a. Jon from Bromley or JFB (Lead Guitar)
- Paul Harding a.k.a. Paul Permo or Paul Centipede (Lead Guitar)
- Stephanie Cohen (Rhythm or Bass Guitars)
- Janet Nassim a.k.a. Janetti Spaghetti or El Janetti Ravioli (Rhythm Guitar)
- Mitch Flacko a.k.a. Mitch Jail Bate (Bass Guitar)
- Paul Venables a.k.a. Veg (Bass Guitar)
- Chris Knowles a.k.a. Chris Elephant Face, Mr. Chris Engelbert Funkadink or Chris Liberator (Drums)

== Discography ==
=== Hagar the Womb ===
- The Word of the Womb (12-inch EP, Mortarhate, MORT2, UK, 1984) - UK Indie No. 6
- Funnery in a Nunnery (12-inch EP, Abstract Sounds, 12ABS029, UK, 1985) - UK Indie No. 9
- A Brighter Shade of Black (LP, Mississippi Records, MR-095, USA, 2011) [compilation]
- Life of Lies / Distant War / You Never Learn (7-inch EP, All the Madmen, MAD25, 2014)
- "Hated By The Daily Mail" (7-inch split with Anthrax (UK), Grow Your Own Records, GYOEP3, UK, 2016)
- Hagiography (CD, One Bright Spark Records 001, 2016) [compilation]
- Hagitate (EP/10"/DD, Grow Your Own Records, GYO21, UK, 2016)

=== We are Going to Eat You ===
- Four Heads Feast (Cassette, 69 Tapes, 1987)
- "I Wish I Knew"/"Let's Fly" (12-inch EP, All the Madmen, 1987)
- "Heart in Hand" (7-inch/12-inch single, Big Cat, 1988)
- Ride Upon the Tide (12-inch EP, Big Cat, 1989)
- Everywhen (LP, Big Cat, 1990)

=== Melt ===
- Neverland (12-inch EP, Big Cat, 1991)
