= All the Madmen =

All the Madmen may refer to:

- All the Madmen Records
- "All the Madmen" (song), a song by David Bowie
