= Let the Tribe Increase =

Studio album by The Mob
- Released: 1983
- Recorded: 6–9 December 1982
- Studio: Spaceward Studios, Cambridge
- Genre: Anarchopunk, post-punk, punk
- Label: All the Madmen Records

The Mob chronology
Ching (1981)	Let the Tribe Increase (1983)

Professional ratings
Review scores
Source	Rating
The Great Indie Discography	5/10 stars

Let the Tribe Increase is the only studio album by English anarcho-punk band The Mob. It was released in 1983, through record label All the Madmen, and is considered an early example of the anarchopunk genre.

== History ==
Let the Tribe Increase was the groups first (and only) LP. It was preceded by three singles: "Crying Again", "Witch Hunt", and "No Doves Fly Here", all songs which were included on Let the Tribe Increase. The album was originally released in 1983 on All the Madmen Records. The address used on the front cover was of the Freedom Press bookshop in London, as all band members were living in squats and co-ops at the time, and did not have a permanent address

The album reached number 3 in the independent charts.

== Reception ==
A review in Maximum Rocknroll described the release as "...a subtle yet affecting album’s worth of political pop ditties. This record may be inconsistent melodically, but the fourteen songs here have strong lyrics component and a simple instrumental approach [...] This may not be thrash, but it is the kind of material that definitely grows on you. Good stuff."

The Sounds review stated: "Their lyrics confront the utter depression and degradation of modern life where alienation and isolation without love are so dwarflingly dominant."

== Track listing ==
All tracks composed by The Mob.

Side A

1. "Another Day Another Death"
2. "Cry of the Morning"
3. "Dance On (You Fool)"
4. "Raised in a Prison"
5. "Slayed"
6. "Our Life Our World"

Side B

1. "Gates of Hell"
2. "I Wish"
3. "Never Understood"
4. "Roger"
5. "Witch Hunt"

== Personnel ==
- Mark Wilson - "warbled" vocals, "strummed" guitar
- Curtis Youe - "plucked" bass
- Josef Porter - drums
- Josef Porter, Mark Wilson, Stephen "Wilf" Wilmott - "Artbitz" (artwork)
