= Capitalism is Cannibalism =

Single by Anthrax (UK band)
- Released: 1983
- Recorded: October 1982
- Genre: Anarcho-punk
- Label: Crass Records

Capitalism is Cannibalism is a 1982 song and EP by the British anarcho-punk band Anthrax. It was considered by many "the band's defining moment." The title comes from a speech by Eugene Victor Debs. It reached No.9 in the UK Indie Hit list and was placed for 10 weeks.

== Track list ==
A1 Capitalism Is Cannibalism

2 Violence Is Violence

B1 Prime To Pension

2 All Things Bright And Beautiful
