= All the Madmen Records =

English record label

All The Madmen Records was a record label started by The Mob in Yeovil, England before relocating to London. Profits from the band's Let The Tribe Increase LP were ploughed back into the label, which was then co-organised by members of the collective which published the Kill Your Pet Puppy zine.

Following the reactivation in 2011 of The Mob, the label was relaunched in 2012 as All The Madmen Records Ltd; a collective trading company.

As of 2016, All the Madmen Records is housed in Rockaway Park, a commune based in Temple Cloud, Somerset. All the buildings on the Rockaway Park grounds were designed and built by Mark Mob (Wilson) and contain large percentages of recycled materials that were sourced from various places.

== Discography ==
- REV 1 The Review – England's Glory 7" (1980)
- MOB 001 The Mob – Youth 7" (1980)
- MAD 002 The Mob – Witch Hunt 7" (1980)
- MAD 003 Andy Stratton – I Don't Know 7" (1980)
- MAD 004 The Mob – Let the Tribe Increase LP (1983)
- MAD 005 The Astronauts – It's All Done By Mirrors LP (1983)
- MAD 006 The Mob – The Mirror Breaks 7" (1983)
- MAD 007 Flowers in the Dustbin – Freaks Run Wild in the Disco 12" (1984)
- MAD 008 Zos Kia – Rape 7"/12" (1984)
- MAD 009 Blyth Power – Chevy Chase 12" (1985)
- MAD 010 Clair Obscur – The Pilgrim's Progress LP (1985)
- MAD 011 The Astronauts – Soon LP (1986)
- MAD 012 Blyth Power – Junction Signal 7"/12" (1986)
- MAD 013 The Mob – Crying Again 12" (1986)
- MAD 014 Thatcher on Acid – The Moondance 12" (1986)
- MAD 015 Blyth Power – Ixion 7"/12" (1986)
- MAD 016 We Are Going To Eat You – I Wish I Knew 12" (1987)
- MADLP 005 The Astronauts – The Seedy Side Of... LP (1987)
- MADLP 006 Blyth Power – Wicked Women, Wicked Men and Wicket Keepers LP (1987)
- MADLP 007 Thatcher on Acid – Curdled LP (1987)
- MADLP 009 Dan – An Attitude Hits LP (1987)
- MADPOET ONE Andy T. – Life at Tether's End (2012)
- MADCD001 Kill Pretty – Dark Heart (2012)
- MAD20 Kill Pretty – Rob a Bank (2012)
- MAD21 The Astronauts – Typically English Day (2013)
- MAD22 Steve Ignorant and Paranoid Visions – If Ignorance Is Bliss EP (2013)
- MAD23 The Mob – Rise Up! (2013)
- MAD24 Virus – It's Not What It Appears (2013)
- MAD25 Hagar the Womb – Life of Lies....Distant War....You Never Learn (2014)
- MAD26 Dogshite – Legacy of Shame EP (2014)
- MAD27 Dead Cult – Ghosts Still Dance (2014)
- MAD28 Steve Lake and Slow Erosion – They Call It Sleep/I'm at War with My Brain (2014)
- MADCD003 Blue Midnight – White Moon (2014)
- MAD29 Andy T. – Bring Whatever You Expect to Find/Jolly Coppers (2014)
- MAD33LP Part1 – Pictures of Pain (2014)
