= Sukatani =

Indonesian punk music duo

- Origin: Purbalingga, Central Java, Indonesia
- Genres: Post-punk
- Years active: 2022–present
- Label: Dugtrax
- Members: Twister Angel; Alectroguy

Sukatani (Pegon script: سكتاني) is an Indonesian punk music duo based in Purbalingga, Central Java. Formed in 2022, the group consists of Alectroguy as the guitarist and producer, and Twister Angel as the vocalist.

Sukatani began gaining widespread attention after their song, "Bayar Bayar Bayar" went viral on various social media platforms. The song criticizes the Indonesian police institution for police corruption and was eventually withdrawn from circulation due to pressure from the police.

== History ==
=== 2022–2023: Formation ===
Sukatani was formed in late 2022 in Sukabumi, West Java, by Muhammad Syifa Al Lutfi (Alectroguy) and Novi Citra Indriyati (Twister Angel). The duo emerged from a farming collective rooted in "street library" initiatives, where both members had previously been involved in separate musical projects. Their collaboration followed a period of shared engagement in agrarian activism, focusing on organic farming, cooperative systems, and food sovereignty.

=== 2023–present: Gelap Gempita and "Bayar Bayar Bayar" ===
Sukatani released their eight-track debut album, Gelap Gempita, on 24 July 2023, preceded by the single "Alas Wirasaba". To promote the album, the duo performed in several Indonesian cities and held the "SG/KL Mini Tour," a series of shows in Singapore and Malaysia on July 2024. The album's title track was later released as the second single on 13 June 2024, accompanied by a music video.

On 20 February 2025, the duo announced via social media that they had withdrawn the track "Bayar Bayar Bayar"—a song criticizing police corruption—from all digital streaming platforms. In the announcement, the members appeared without their signature masks to introduce themselves and issue an apology to the Chief of the Indonesian National Police. Following the video's release, media outlets reported that the duo became unreachable, and the group's vocalist was subsequently dismissed from their position as an elementary school teacher.

The withdrawal of "Bayar Bayar Bayar" sparked public debate regarding alleged police intimidation and restrictions on freedom of expression in Indonesia. Despite its removal from official platforms, the song gained widespread popularity and became a prominent anthem during the 2025 Indonesian protests. This case has also fueled debates on restrictions on freedom of expression in Indonesia. Later that year, both "Bayar Bayar Bayar" and "Gelap Gempita" were featured as the soundtrack for the drama film Ozora, directed by Anggy Umbara. To coincide with the film's release, an alternative music video for "Gelap Gempita" was released on 25 November 2025. "Bayar Bayar Bayar" was later included in a limited-edition physical reissue, which featured live bonus tracks.

Sukatani made a guest appearance on the album Thunder Boarding School by Teenage Death Star, collaborated with The Brandals on the single "Jari Kasar," and contributed to the Sonic/Panic Vol. 3 compilation. Between 2025 and 2026, the duo released the singles "Tumbal Proyek" and "Chase the Cash". These releases were followed by their international tour, Gigantour, which ran from November to December 2025, and the Swagman Tour, which included six dates across Australia in May 2026.

== Artistry ==
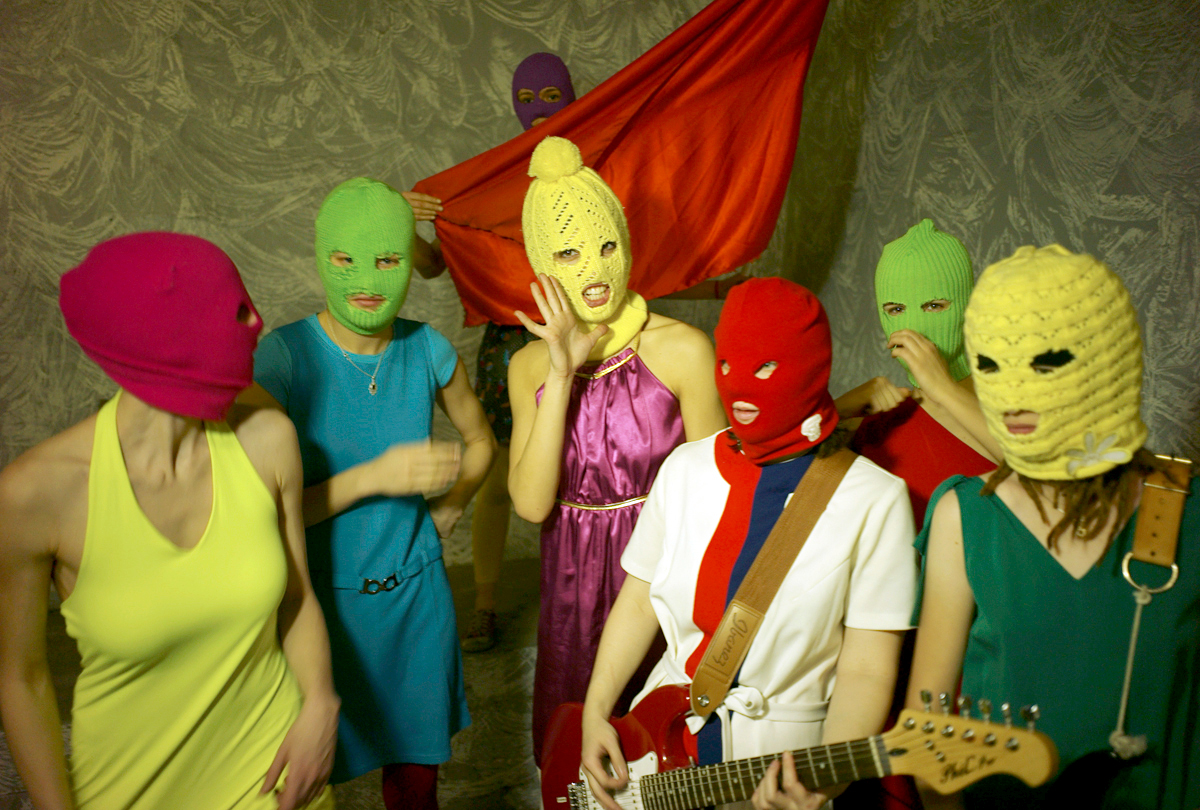
The visual aesthetic of Pussy Riot is often cited as a key fashion influence for Sukatani.

Sukatani is characterized by a post-punk sound heavily influenced by 1980s anarcho-punk. Their musical style blends post-punk elements with strong new wave sensibilities, featuring dark gothic rock tones combined with new romantic melodies and lively synth-pop influences. This unique fusion resembles other bands such as Le Tigre, The Slits, Sleater-Kinney, Bikini Kill, and Franz Ferdinand, known for their dance-punk style. The duo’s lyrics typically address socio-political issues, with a particular focus on economic disparity and government policy.

Their stage presence is noted for the use of balaclava, a visual choice reminiscent of the Russian protest group Pussy Riot. During live performances, the duo maintains anonymity through these masks, incorporating the distribution of fresh produce as a performance art element. This gesture serves as a social commentary on environmental sustainability, public health, and food security.

== Band members ==
- Twister Angel – vocalist, songwriter (2022-present)
- Alectroguy – guitarist, producer (2022-present)

== Discography ==
=== Studio albums ===
Title	Details
Gelap Gempita	Released: 24 July 2023; Label: Gerhana Records & Tampui Records; Formats: cassette, digital download, vinyl

=== Guest appearances ===
Title	Year	Other artist(s)	Album
"Pesantren Kilat"	2025	Teenage Death Star	Thunder Boarding School
"Jari Kasar"	2025	The Brandals	None
"Kebangkitan"	2025	IKLIM	Sonic/Panic Vol. 3

=== Music videos ===
List of music videos, with director(s)
Title	Year	Director(s)
"Alas Wirasaba"	2023	Dilan & Cipoy
"Gelap Gempita"	2024	Tutus Adi Pambudi
"Jari Kasar" (with The Brandals)^{1}	2025	Eka Annash
"Tumbal Proyek"	2025	Febrian A. Hasibuan
"Gelap Gempita" (Ozora version)	2025	Anggy Umbara

- ^{1}As featuring artist.

== Live performance and tours ==
Stage performances

- Crowd Noise (Korpri building Slawi, Tegal; Sunday, 23 February 2025 night)
- Tulang Punggung (Sleman, Yogyakarta; Tuesday, 25 February 2025 night)

Headlining tours

- SG/KL Mini Tour (2024)
- Gigantour (2025)
- Swagman Tour (2026)
