= Lost Cherrees =

English anarcho-punk band

- Origin: Sutton, Surrey
- Genre: Anarcho-punk
- Years active: 1979–1986; 2003–present
- Labels: Mortarhate Records; Riot/Clone Records; Anti-Society Records; Diablo Records; Grow Your Own Records
- Members: Liss Fitzgerald; Tay Gunn; Ashby Moss; Skapete Dawson; Steve Battershill; Teez Riot
- Past members: Marie Repulsive; Trystan O'Connell; Quita Doubleday; Beverley Cook Abbott; Andy Rolfe; Warren "Nuts" Samuels; Siân Jeffreys; Debbie McKenna; Gail Thibert; Joey Hill; Jeremy "Buzz" Buzzing; Dave Greaves; Shea Refuse; Matt Thair

Lost Cherrees is an anarcho-punk band from London, UK, originally active from 1979 to 1986, reformed in 2003, and remain active to the current day.

== History ==
Lost Cherrees were formed in Sutton in 1979 by drummer Steve Battershill, guitarist Dave Greaves, and singer Siân Jeffreys. They recorded six tracks and released them on cassette as The Worst Demo Ever Recorded, which was split with the band Warning. In 1981, Greaves left the band and was replaced by Andy Rolfe, while Battershill switched to bass and new drummer Warren "Nuts" Samuels joined. This lineup recorded another demo in 1982, which was released on the Bluurg label.

The band's first proper gig was at the Swan pub in Kingston in July 1982 with the band Riot/Clone. The two bands starting working together regularly, leading to the first official Lost Cherrees single release, "No Fighting, No War, No Trouble, No More" on Riot/Clone's label in late 1983. John Peel became an unexpected supporter of the song, and it reached number 27 on the UK Independent Singles chart. Their next single, "A Man's Duty, A Woman's Place," from a five-track EP of the same title, was released in 1984 and reached number 8 on the UK Independent Singles chart.

The band made the news after a gig at the Surbiton Assembly Rooms, which ended in a pitched battle on the streets of Surbiton with the Special Patrol Group; the incident was reported as a riot in next day's national press. During this period, the band added keyboardist Gail Thibert and singer Beverly Cook-Abbott. Founding singer Siân Jeffreys announced her departure and the band recruited Debbie McKenna as her replacement. Jeffreys then decided to stay on and the band continued with an unconventional seven-member lineup with three female lead singers.

Lost Cherrees contributed two songs to the compilation Who? What? Why? When? Where? in 1984. They also contributed a partially spoken-word track to the compilation We Don't Want Your Fucking War in 1984. Their first full album, All Part of Growing Up, engineered by Mad Professor and Patrick Donegan, was released on Fight Back Records in 1985. The album reached number 9 on the UK Independent Albums chart. Jeffreys left the band shortly before the album's release and joined Blyth Power. Lost Cherrees attracted attention for pushing the boundaries of punk rock, with female singers, keyboards, and reggae elements. Their 1985 EP Unwanted Children featured a horn section.

At a gig in Birmingham in 1986, singer Bev Cook-Abbott got into an argument with audience members over sexist comments and announced that this would be the last performance by Lost Cherrees, and the band agreed to break up due to disillusionment with their disappointing record sales. The band members participated in various other projects over the next 17 years. In 2003, Battershill learned that Lost Cherrees tracks were being traded on Napster and reformed the band with Cook-Abbott, Nuts, and Rolfe. They were unable to locate Jeffreys, Thibert, and McKenna, leaving Cook-Abbott as the only lead singer, though Rolfe soon took on additional vocal duties. This lineup began performing regularly in 2003 and were able to reestablish contact with the three missing members, who made occasional special appearances with the band onstage. In September 2003 Lost Cherrees played at the Gathering of the Thousands punk festival with many other bands from their original 1980s punk scene.

In 2003, the newly reformed band released the compilation In the Beginning (later, in 2006, this was reissued as a double CD album 'In The Very Beginning') as part of a project in which their early works were re-released. They released the five-track EP Another Bite of the Cherrees in early 2004. While touring in 2004, Bev Cook-Abbott had to take time off due to vocal cord nodules and was temporarily replaced by Joey Hill. The studio album Free to Speak, But Not to Question was released in early 2006 and was praised by AllMusic as "one of those so-rare examples of a band picking up precisely where they left off, and then astonishing every ear by proving that they lost absolutely nothing during their absence."

In 2012/13 a brief collaboration with Antisociety Records saw the release of two singles, including a 12" vinyl benefit release for The Sophie Lancaster Foundation, featuring Steve Lake of Zounds, Andy T, Annie Anxiety Bandez and Jennie Matthais (The Belle Stars). A reissue of back catalogue E.P.s was also released during the association with the label./>

From there, Lost Cherrees released a single and two albums through the Diablo label as well as some very limited runs of self released titles. See discography./>

The next studio release was the Blank Pages album, released through Grow Your Own Records on CD and vinyl./>

Having gone through line-up changes throughout the past two decades, the band continued writing, recording and gigging, with spells of inactivity due to the Covid 19 pandemic and departing members. In 2025, the line-up was Liss, Tay, Pete, Ash, Matt & Steve, with a forthcoming 5-track single, recorded and due for release in the May/June 2025.

In 2026, the Lost Cherrees parted company with long time drummer Matt, and were joined by Teez Riot, just before the bands appearance at the Rebellion Festival in Blackpool.

== Discography ==
Singles;
No Fighting, No War, No Trouble, No More - (7 track, 7" vinyl E.P.) 1983 Riot/Clone Records
A Man's Duty... A Woman's Place - (5 track, 7" vinyl E.P.)1984 Mortarhate Records
Unwanted Children - (4 track, 12" vinyl E.P.) 1985 Mortarhate Records
Another Bite Of The Cherrees - (5 track, clear/black 7" vinyl E.P.) 2003 Alternative Records US
Fathers4Justice - (5 track CD) 2004 Fathers4Justice campaign release
CD Sampler - (3 track CD) 2005 Self-released numbered ltd ed.
Hung, Drawn & Quartered - (4 track red/white/black 7" vinyl EP) 2012 Antisociety Records
S.O.P.H.I.E - (2 track 12" vinyl) with 22 Chillies 2013 Antisociety Records
16 Guns/Lost Cherrees Split E.P - (4 track CD) 2014 Self-released
Common People - (5 track orange/turquoise/black 12" vinyl) 2016 Diablo Records
Rage - (3 track Yellow/black splatter & black 7" vinyl, & 5 track CD single) 2025 Self released

Albums;
All Part Of Growing Up - (16 track 12" vinyl) 1984 Fight Back Records
In The Beginning - (28 track CD Comp) Mortarhate Records
Free To Speak.... But Not To Question - (17 track CD) 2006 Mortarhate Records
In The Very Beginning - (66 track double CD Comp) 2006 Mortarhate Records
Singles 1982-1985 - (14 track, blue/black 12" vinyl Comp) 2012 Antisociety Records
Who's Fucking Who? Who's Funding Who? - (16 track CD, purple/white/black 12" vinyl) 2013 Diablo Records
Live At AWOD 2013 - (15 track CD, Ltd Ed. Red 12" vinyl) 2016 Diablo Records
The 12"s 2013-2016 - (7 track CD Comp) 2016 Self released
Blank Pages - (12 track CD, 12" vinyl) 2019 Grow Your Own Records
