= Paranoid Visions =

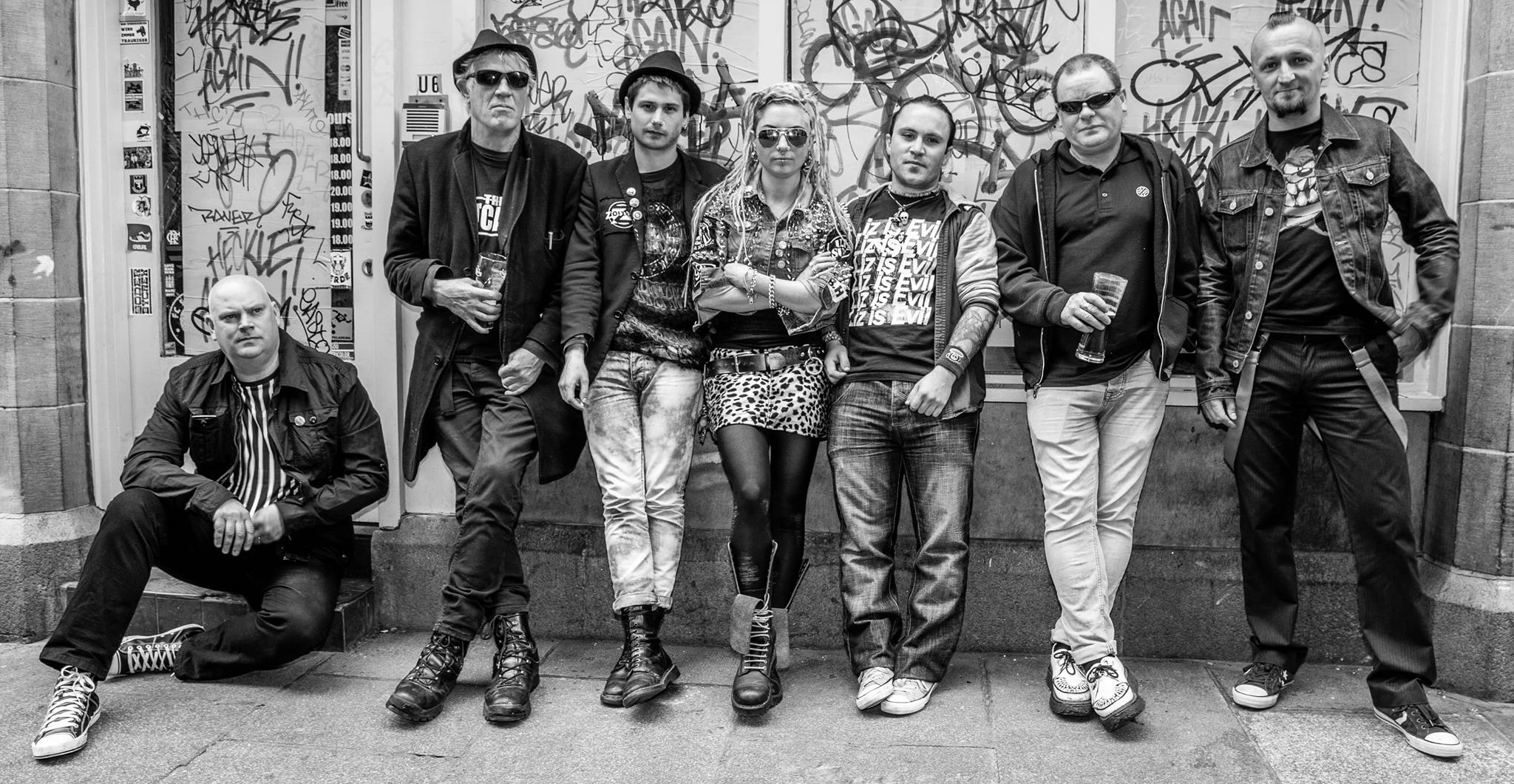

Background information
- Origin: Dublin, Ireland
- Genres: Anarcho-punk, punk rock
- Years active: 1982–1992, 1996, 2001, 2005–present
- Labels: F.O.A.D., Overground Records, All the Madmen
- Members: Deko Dachau; P.J.; Danarchy; Aoife Destruction; Steo Pain; Jay Bagnall; TJ Qra
- Past members: Skinny; Brayo; Caff; Brian; Colin; Nikki; Aisling; Emily; Nuala; Beano; Kevorkain; Joe Libido; Darragh; Chris; Danny; Martin; Sarah Bellum; The Master Switch; Greg; Geno; Denis; Karl young; Al; karl Stephenson
- Website: www.advancerecords.com

Paranoid Visions are a punk rock band from Dublin, Ireland who formed in 1982. They broke up in 1992, had several reunion shows and reunited in 2005.

The band ran their own label, F.O.A.D. (Fuck Off And Die), during the 1980s and 1990s. The label was based in Dublin and operated by guitarist P.J., who also handles most of the band’s administrative duties.

In 1987, the band started the FOAD2U2 campaign (meaning fuck off and die to U2). These letters could be seen sprayed all over Dublin at the time. Their EP, I Will Wallow is a parody of U2's album, Boy, and their single "I Will Follow". The band went on hiatus in the early 1990s reforming for shows in 1996 with the Sex Pistols on the Filthy Lucre Tour and The Damned on their 25th anniversary tour of 2001. In 2005, Toxic Records released the compilation album Outside In, resulting in the band reforming for a few shows in support of the release. The reformation led to a creative burst and resulted in the Missing in Action EP. The critical and commercial success of the record continued the creative vein and between 2005 and 2017 the band released five new albums and 12 singles. The January 2009 release Beware of the God. was voted number 107 in the list of the most important Irish albums in Hot Press magazine, whilst the singles "Politician", "Treasure on the Wasteland" and "Outsider Artist" (featuring TV Smith) all hit the Irish top 10.

In 2013, the band formed an unlikely alliance with Crass vocalist Steve Ignorant, which started out life as a single track and led on to regular live performances, two albums and two singles. The band alongside Ignorant have played some of the biggest alternative festivals in the world including Chicago's Riot Fest, Canada's Amnesia Festival and the annual appearance at the UK's Rebellion Festival. At the latter, the band performed a set featuring Crass songs for the first time in seven years, alongside tracks by Flux of Pink Indians, Poison Girls, DIRT and Conflict, as well as their own material. The 2016 album, Now and Then...! featuring Steve Ignorant, entered the Irish charts at number 6.

In September 2025, the two-hour TV documentary film Outsider Artists: The Story of Paranoid Visions was premiered at Dublin's Sugar Club to a full house. Produced, directed and edited by Greg Clifford and Dave Clifford, the film captures the band's spirit in the face of adversity over four decades. Paranoid Visions serve as a prism through which the two independent film-makers look at the changing face of Ireland. The screening was followed by a question and answer session and then by a performance by Paranoid Visions.

== Discography ==
• Destroy The Myths of Musical Progression K7 - FOAD Records - ??? - August 1983 - with lyric sheet • Blood in the Snow K7 - FOAD Records - ??? - 1983

• Destroy / Blood K7 - Bluurg Records - UK - 1984 Reissue of first two cassettes

• From the Womb to the Bucket K7 - FOAD Records - ??? - 1984 K7 - Bluurg Records - ??? - UK - 1984 - *16 tracks with 12pp booklet

• Weird Weird World of Guru Weirdbrain *various artists LP - Hotwire Records - HWLP8505 - IRL - 1985

- tracks: I Will Follow (Moving Statues)

• The Robot Is Running Amok EP 7" - FOAD Records/All The Madmen - FOAD 1 - 1986 - foc + insert

• Schizophrenia LP - FOAD Records/All The Madmen - FOAD 2 - 1987 LP - FOAD Records/Revolver - FOAD 2 - 1988 - repress

• I Will Wallow 10" - FOAD Records/All The Madmen - FOAD 2U2 - 1987 - insert 12" - FOAD Records - FOAD 2U2 - (1989) unconfirmed

- The repress on 12-inch was announced but its existence is unconfirmed.

• Autonomy // Social Security / Strange Girl (live 18.3.87)

- 7" - FOAD Records/Revolver - FOAD 5 - 1988 - foc + poster + lyric insert

• Reaganstein/Paranoid Visions - FOAD To You Fascist American Contra Scum

- (Nicaragua Benefit Single)
- 7" - FOAD Records/Revolver - FOAD 6 - 1988 -

folded double-printed A3-size sleeve 'Fake' split EP, Reaganstein is a P.V. alter ego the name rumoured to have been taken from the label run by Black Country/West Midlands anarcho punks Indecent Assault i.e. Reaganstein Records, launched in 1986 as a DIY label to release their own material. This has never been confirmed...

- side one:

Reaganstein - Blood Empires

- side two:

Paranoid Visions - Ignore It (live 18.3.87)

• Autonomy EP + Reaganstein/Paranoid Visions *split single split single 2x7" - FOAD Records - FOAD 5 + FOAD 6 - 1988

- Double pack consisting of the above two singles.

• Get Off The Map.. (City of Screams) mini-LP - FOAD Records/Revolver - FOAD 1000. *1988 - green vinyl + insert. Also exists as black vinyl test pressing.

• various artists - Comet Tape 3 K7 - Comet Records - COMTAPE 5 - IRL - 1988

- tracks: The Other Half Lives

• various artists - ALF LP - No Masters Voice - ??? - USA - 1989

- track: The Feast

• Immature Recollections K7 - FOAD Records - FOAD 9 - 1990

• The Dismal Abysmals :- Illegitimate Targets K7 - FOAD Records - ??? - 1990? Another P.V. alter ego

• Tripping The Live Disaster K7 - FOAD Records - ??? - 1990?

• Politician EP [cassingle] K7 - FOAD Records - ??? - 1991

• various artists - Dirt Behind the Daydream Vol.1 K7 - FOAD Records - FOAD 9T1 - 1991 tracks:

- Answerable 2 Nun
- Snuff Show
- Look At Me

• various artists - Dirt Behind the Daydream Vol.2 K7 - FOAD Records - ??? - 1991

• Bollox To Christmas K7 - FOAD Records - ??? - 1992?

• After the Faction (Best Of) CD - AX-S Records - AXS95CD001 - 1995 Distributed via Southern (UK), Cargo (US) *and Sound Solutions (Germany).

• Live in Stab City CD - April 2006

• The Triangular EP (Home Sweet Hell) 2x7" - Wednesday Works - DAY 1 - IRL - 1996. *One disc is a flexi. Archive recordings.

• Outside In. The Vinyl Years 1986-1989 CD - Toxic Records - ??? - 2005

• Missing In Action EP CD-R - 2007

• 40 Shades of Gangreen CD-R - March 2007

• 3R'S EP
CD - 2008
FOAD 0801

• The Treasure From The Wasteland EP - Lost Gems From Dublin '79 + '80
CD & 12" Vinyl
2008
FOAD 0802

(an ep of tracks originally performed by some Irish artists who had been a huge influence on Paranoid Visions) tracks:

- Treasure On The Wasteland (originally by the Atrix)
- High Cost Of Living (originally by the Threat)
- Reptile (originally by the DC Nein)

• Hate From The Cities Vol 1
CD & 12" Vinyl
2008
FOAD 0803

Paranoid Visions/Dirty Love/Moutpiece

PV tracks:

- Sex Kills (Alt mix)
- Amhrán na Bhfiann

• Hate From The Cities Vol 2
CD & 12" Vinyl
2008
FOAD 0804
Paranoid Visions/Devilish Presley/Kidd Blunt

PV tracks:

- Frantic World (From Toxic compilation)
- Visions (Recorded live in the Voodoo Lounge April 2006)

• Hate From The Cities Vol 3
CD & 12" Vinyl
2008
FOAD 0805
Paranoid Visions/The Restarts/Excuses

PV track:

- Shell To Sea (Rough Mix)
- You're A Wanker (From The Dismal Abysmals Sessions 1990)

• Beware Of The God
12" Vinyl & CD
March 2009
FOAD 0902LP & FOAD 0902CD

• I Am The One
7" Vinyl & CD
2009
FOAD 0903 & FOAD 0903CD

• Strobelight And Torture
7" Vinyl & CD
2010
FOAD 10017in & FOAD 1001CD

• Black Operations In The Red Mist
Double CD
2010
Overground Records 124CD LC4593

• Der Election
CD
2011
FOAD 1101CD

'Politician 2011' from Der Election reached No.6 in the Irish Top 10 Physical Singles Charts for week ending 24th Feb 2011.
Outsider Artist ep:

- outsider artist (featuring TV Smith)
- prophet for the lost (featuring the blame)
- control (featuring the shend)

Escape from the Austerity Complex (FOAD / Overground) (2012)

up the anti

if ignorance is bliss 7" single (All the Madmen) (2013) / CD (FOAD) (steve ignorant with paranoid visions)

When...? LP and CD (FOAD / Overground) (2013) (steve ignorant with paranoid visions)

Two Black Eyes 7" / CD (FOAD / Overground) (2015)

Across the Holocausts Flexi Disc (FOAD) (2015)

Cryptic Cross Words LP / CD (FOAD / Overground) (2015)

The Height of Ignorance 10" / CD ep (FOAD / Overground / Maloka) (2015) (steve ignorant with paranoid visions)

Now and Then...! LP / CD (FOAD / Overground) (2016) (steve ignorant with paranoid visions) Irish chart placing at #6

Rebellion (FOAD / Overground / Maloka) (2017) limited edition pink vinyl
