= Toxic Waste (band) =

Northern Irish anarcho-punk band

- Origin: Belfast, Northern Ireland
- Genres: Punk rock, anarcho-punk
- Years active: 1982–1986
- Label: Mortarhate Records
- Members: Phil; Patsy; Grub; Marty; Roy Wallace; Smurf; Dane; Mark
- Website: www.myspace.com/toxicwasteofficial

Toxic Waste was an anarcho-punk band from Belfast, Northern Ireland.

== Career ==
The band formed in 1982 in Newtownards, County Down, after being inspired by the Crass gig at the Anarchy Centre in Belfast. Featuring Phil on bass, Patsy on vocals, Colin McKee (Bangor) on drums to then be replaced by Grub and Marty on guitar they wanted to take the DIY and anti-establishment ethos of punk one step further. They played their first gig at the West Winds Roadhouse in 1982, and regularly played around Bangor, Belfast and the Ards area for the next two years, in the same scene as the Belfast band Stalag 17. In 1984 they moved to Belfast and were joined by second vocalist Roy Wallace. They gigged with Conflict in the Manhattan Club which resulted in them doing a number of recordings for Conflict's label Mortarhate. Members of the band were involved with the Belfast-based Warzone Collective, which included a vegetarian cafe called Giros, practice space for bands, and screen-printing studio.

They toured Europe twice before they eventually split in 1986. Roy Wallace released Belfast in 1987, performing with Deno and Gary from DIRT to re-record old Toxic Waste tracks (as well as previously unreleased tracks). Marty and Roy used their experience from their time in Toxic Waste to form Bleeding Rectum. The band was revived briefly in 1991 for a benefit tour, with Deno from DIRT on vocals.

== Discography ==
- Unite to Resist (Cassette, self-released, 1983)
- "Good Morning" on We Don't Want Your Fucking War (Compilation LP, Mortarhate, 1984)
- The Truth Will Be Heard (split with Stalag 17) (12" EP, Mortarhate, 1985)
- We Will Be Free (split with Stalag 17 and Asylum) (LP, Mortarhate, 1986)
- Belfast (LP, Belfast Records, 1987)
- We Will Be Free (Compilation LP, Rejected Records, 1998)
