= Włochaty =

Polish hardcore punk band

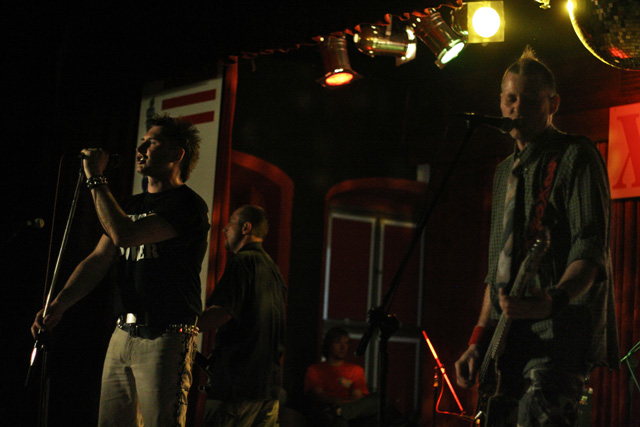
- Włochaty live in Chojna 2007-04-27

Background information
- Origin: Szczecin, Poland
- Genres: Hardcore punk Anarcho-punk
- Years active: 1987–present
- Labels: Silverton; ABC Tapes; Mega Czad; NiktNicNieWie
- Members: Skoda - guitar Dydas - guitar Graba - vocals Jeż - bass guitar, vocals Billy - drums
- Past members: Pauluss (1990–2008); Florens (2004); Graba (2002–2003); Kieras (2000–2001); Filip (1997–2000); Anka (1994–1997); Roberto (1997); Fagas (1987–1997); Kamil (2008)
- Website: http://www.wlochaty.most.org.pl/

Włochaty (literally hairy) is a Polish hardcore punk band from Szczecin formed in 1987.

== History ==
The band played its first concert in 1987 in Szczecin as Włochaty Odkurzacz (The Hairy Vacuum Cleaner). The band dropped Odkurzacz (Vacuum Cleaner) from its name in 1990. Their first album For Sale was released in 1991 with an initial pressing of 100 copies. They appeared at the Jarocin festival in 1993.

In March 1994 the band released their eponymous album Włochaty on cassette tape and re-released their debut album For Sale. The Włochaty album was released on vinyl in 1995. Also in 1995 the band toured Germany with Oi Polloi.

An EP Wojna Przeciwko Ziemi (War Against The Earth) was released in 1996. The following year Fagas and Anka left the band and Filip joined it. They released the albums Droga Oporu (Way Of The Resistance - 1999), Zamiana Pieniędzy na Rebelię (Exchanging Money For Rebellion - 2000) and Zmowa (Conspiracy - 2000).

In 2001 Billy had his leg amputated as a result of serious injury he suffered few years before. After a year break the band returned with the album Tryumf Anarchii nad Tyranią (The Triumph Of Anarchy Over Tyranny), and with their first professional video. In 2003 Wlochaty toured France. The next year they released an album titled Dzień Gniewu (Day Of Rage) and in 2005 came Bunt i Miłość (Rebellion And Love).

== Discography ==
- For Sale 1991 (re-released in 1994)
- Live 1993
- Włochaty EP – 1993, MC – 1994, LP – 1995
- Bank Światowy 1996
- Wojna Przeciwko Ziemi 1996
- Droga Oporu 1999
- Zamiana Pieniędzy na Rebelię 2000
- Zmowa 2000
- Tryumf Anarchii nad Tyranią 2002
- Dzień Gniewu 2004
- Bunt i Miłość 2005
- Wbrew wszystkiemu 2010
