= Anthrax (British band) =

English anarcho-punk band

- Origin: Gravesend, Kent, England
- Genre: Anarcho-punk
- Years active: 1980–1984, 2010–present
- Labels: Crass, Small Wonder
- Website: anthraxukoffical.com

Anthrax are an English anarcho-punk band formed in Gravesend, Kent, in 1980. They recorded their first demo in 1981 and went on to release two 7" EPs on Crass Records and Small Wonder Records. They appeared on compilations released by Crass Records, Mortarhate Records and Fightback Records. They toured outside the UK twice in the Netherlands with Dutch band The Ex.

In 2007, the band issued a compilation album, One Last Drop, which included demos, both EPs, the Mortarhate compilation track and two live tracks.

The band reformed in 2010, releasing new (and debut) album All for the Cause in 2012. Two split singles followed in 2015.

== Line-up ==
- Oskar – vocals
- Gareth – bass
- Pete – drums
- Dee – guitar
- Laurence Windle – bass
- Shaun – rhythm guitar

== Discography ==
=== Demos ===
- 81 Demo (Tape 1981)
- Capitalism Gives Opportunities in Life, Anarchy Gives Life (Tape 1982)

=== EPs ===
- Capitalism is Cannibalism (EP, Crass Records, 1982)
- They've Got It All Wrong (EP, Small Wonder Records, 1983)
- One Last Drop / Welcome (CD single, Happy Release 2, 2009)
- Split EP (DL, 2015) [w/PedAgree Skum, Dog Shite, SLUG]
- Split EP (7"/DL, 2015) [w/Hagar the Womb]

=== Album ===
- All for the Cause (LP/CD/DL, 2012)

=== Compilation tracks ===
- "All the Wars" on Bullshit Detector Volume 2 (LP Compilation, Crass Records, 1982)
- "It'll Be Alright on the Night" on Who? What? Why? Where? When? (LP Compilation, Mortarhate Records, 1983)
- "Violence Is Violence 82" on We Don't Want Your Fucking War! (LP Compilation, Fightback Records, 1984)

=== Reissue ===
- "Capitalism is Cannibalism" EP, on A Sides. Part Two. 1982-1985 (LP Compilation, Crass Records 1985)
- "It'll Be Alright on the Night", on We Won't Take No More (CD Compilation, Go Kart Records, 2001)
- "It'll Be Alright on the Night", on Who? What? Why? Where? When? (CD Compilation, Mortarhate Records, 2003)
- "Violence Is Violence 82", on We Don't Want Your Fucking War! (CD Compilation, Mortarhate Records, 2006)
- One Last Drop (Compilation CD, Happy Release Records, 2007)
