= Icon A.D. =

English anarcho-punk band

- Also known as: Icon (1979–1981)
- Origin: Leeds, West Yorkshire, England
- Genres: Anarcho punk
- Years active: 1979–1981, 1982–1983
- Labels: Radical Change, Underground
- Past members: Bev Smith; Craig Sharp-Weir; Roger Turnbull; Mark Holmes; Dicky Walton; Phil Smith; Mick; Caroline Holmes

Icon A.D. (formerly known as Icon) were an English anarcho-punk band formed in Leeds in 1979. They were included on Crass' 1980 compilation album Bullshit Detector and in 1982 recorded a Peel session for BBC Radio 1. Their debut EP Don't Feed Us Shit reach number twenty on the UK Independent chart. Steve Lamacq cited their second EP Let The Vultures Fly... as one his favourite U.K. punk records of all time.

== History ==
Prior to forming the band, Sharp-Weir and Holmes had played together in local punk rock bands including the Jackets and Terminal Boredom. They formed the band in 1979 with Phil Smith and Dicky Walton while attending Temple Moor High School, under the name Icon. They frequently performed at the venues such as the F Club and Tiffany's. After sending a home-recorded demo to the members of the Crass, they were including on their 1980 compilation album Bullshit Detector. They officially broke-up in 1981, when the members left high school, however Sharp and Holmes continued rehearsing together. In 1982, the pair entered the studio half-heartedly, with Sharp's sister and Holmes' wife, Caroline Holmes and her younger sister Bev Smith on vocals and took on the name Icon A.D. They released the Don't Feed us Shit EP in September of the same year which reached number twenty on the UK Independent Singles and Albums Charts, through Radical Change records. They soon recruited bassist Roger Turnbull of Leeds post-punk band F-3 and recommenced performing live, however Caroline Holmes stepped down soon after, leading to Bev Smith being the sole vocalist. In October they recorded a session for BBC Radio 1 presenter John Peel, followed by the recording and release of their second EP Let The Vultures Fly.... Soon after, they broke up in early 1983. In 2006, Underground Records released a compilation albums of their entire discography titled ...Lest We Forget.

== Musical style ==
The band have been categorised as anarcho punk. Guitarist Sharp-Weir cited their biggest influence as being fellow-Leeds punk rock band Abrasive Wheels, along with lesser influences like Crass, Killing Joke, Siouxsie and the Banshees, Ramones, AC/DC and Motörhead. Their music was aggressive however also melodic.

== Discography ==
EPs

- Don't Feed Us Shit (1982)
- Let The Vultures Fly... (1982)

Live

- John Peel Session (1982)

Compilations

- ...Lest We Forget (2006)

== Members ==
Final line-up

- Bev Smith – vocals (1982–1983)
- Craig Sharp-Weir – guitar (1979–1983)
- Roger Turnbull – bass (1982–1983)
- Mark Holmes – drums (1979–1983)

Former

- Dicky Walton – vocals (1979–1981)
- Phil Smith – bass (1979–1981)
- Mick – bass (1981)
- Caroline Holmes – vocals (1982)
