= Thatcher on Acid =

British anarcho-punk band

- Origin: England
- Genre: Anarcho-punk
- Years active: 1983–1998
- Labels: All the Madmen, Agit-Prop

Thatcher on Acid were an English anarcho-punk band. They formed in Somerset during 1983. Their name is a satirical reference to former UK prime minister Margaret Thatcher. Ben Corrigan, Bob Butler and Andy Tuck also played in Schwartzeneggar with ex-Crass member, Steve Ignorant. The band opened the anarcho-punk band Conflict's "Gathering of the 5000" show at Brixton Academy, an event which resulted in many arrests and achieved a degree of infamy.

Bassist Bob Butler died in 2022.

== Members ==
- Ben Corrigan – guitar/vocals
- Matt Cornish – bass/vocals
- Martin Hosken – drums (1983–1987)
- Andy Tuck – drums (1987 onwards)
- Bob Butler – bass (died 2022)

== Discography ==
=== Singles & EPs ===
- Moondance (1986 – 12" – All the Madmen)
- Flannel 905 (1990 – 7" – Rugger Bugger Discs)
- Thatcher On Acid Meets Steerpike – The Illusion Of Being Together (1990 – 12" – Meantime Records)
- Can We Laugh Now? / No Fucking War (1992 – Split EP with 7 Year Bitch – Clawfist Records)
- Yo Yo Man (1992 – 7" – K Records)
- "Frank" Jr. (1992 – 7" – Subcorridor Records)
- Chagrin (1992 – 7" – Desperate Attempt Records)

=== LPs ===
- Curdled (1987 – All the Madmen)
- Frank (1991 – Agit-Prop)
- Squib (1992 – split CD with Wat Tyler named Yurp Thing – Allied Records)

=== Compilations & live albums ===
- Thatcher On Acid (1988 – also known as Garlic – Rugger Bugger Records)
- Curdled/The Moondance (1997 – reissued of first LP plus first 12" – Broken Rekids Record)
- Pressing: 84-91 (1995 – Desperate Attempt Records)
