= Los Muertos de Cristo =

Spanish punk band

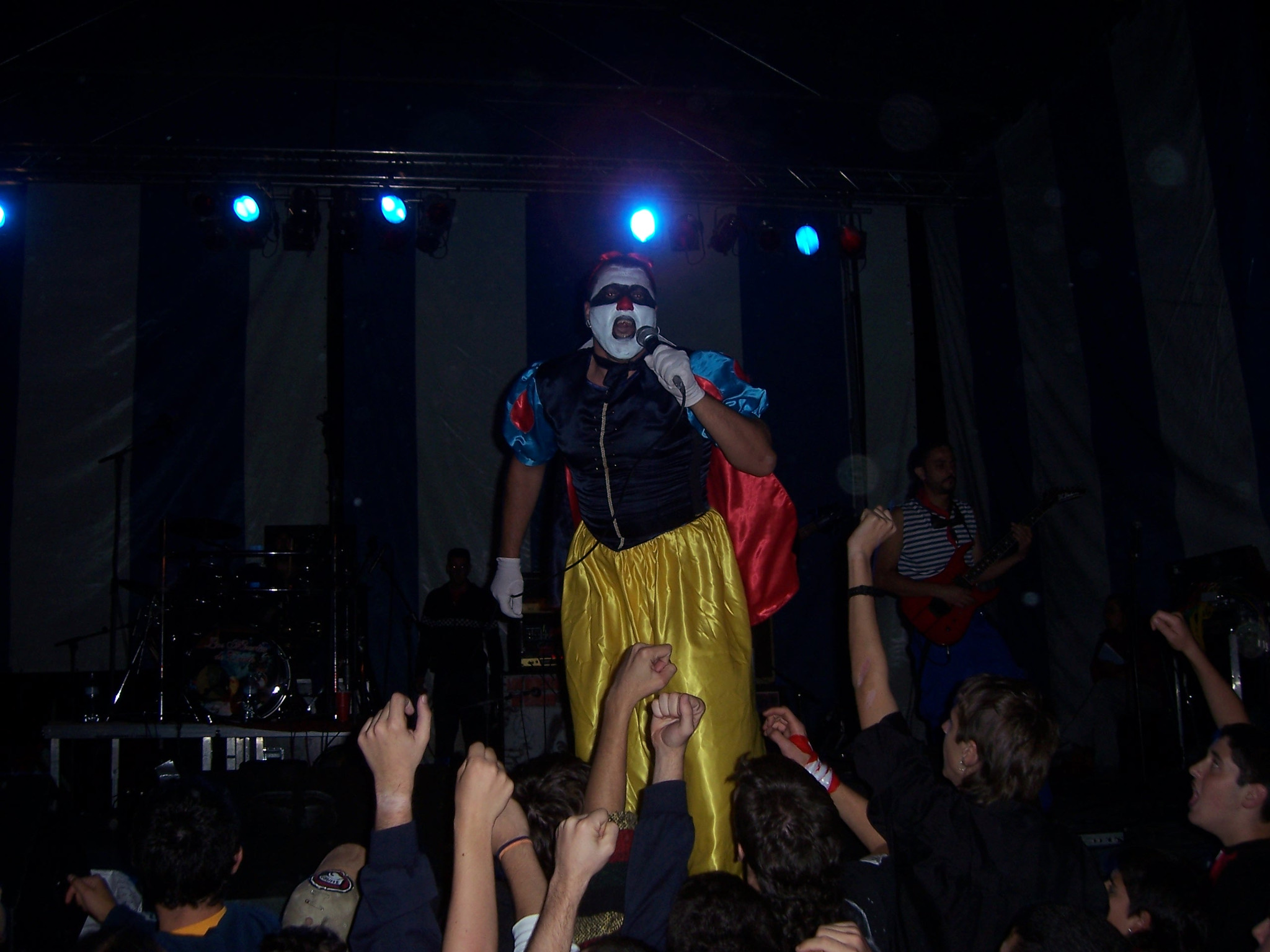
- LMDC at a concert in Haro, La Rioja

Background information
- Origin: Utrera, Andalusia, Spain
- Genres: Punk rock Anarcho-punk; Folk punk Hardcore punk
- Years active: 1989–2008
- Labels: Odisea Records; Potencial Hardcore
- Members: Lorenzo Morales "El Noi"; Antón Tochi; Jesús Mosteiros "Mosti"; Ignacio Gallego "Chino"; Manuel Borrego "Lolo"
- Website: www.losmuertosdecristo.com (archived)

Los Muertos de Cristo (LMDC, The Dead of Christ) was a Spanish anarchist punk band, formed in Utrera, Andalusia in 1989. LMDC announced its dissolution in 2006, although they did one last tour in 2008 and then released their final album (Rapsodia Libertaria Vol. III) in 2009, before retiring. Vocalist Lorenzo Morales later founded the group El Noi del Sucre.

== History ==
Los Muertos de Cristo was formed in 1989 in the Andalusian town of Utrera, Province of Seville. LMDC's first concert took place a year later, in Utrera. They began recording their first album A las Barricadas in 1994, but due to the record company's financial problems it was released in 1995.

In 2000, while mixing the album Bienvenidos al infierno, vocalist Lorenzo Morales set out to create an exhaustive work that would delve into the libertarian movement. The multimedia project was titled Rapsodia Libertaria, consisting of three album volumes, each accompanied by a nearly 400-page book. The first volume was released in 2004. The band announced their dissolution at the BaituRock festival in 2006. LMDC's farewell tour lasted a year, with the Spanish tour ending in 2008 in Fuenlabrada, Madrid. The Latin American tour consisted of four concerts, beginning in Guadalajara, Mexico on 14 June; their final concert took place on 28 June 2008, at the Estadio Nacional (National Stadium) in Santiago, Chile.

The band's final album, Rapsodia Libertaria Vol. III, was released on 9 November 2009. It consisted of the live performances in Fuenlabrada and Santiago. Upon dissolution, the rights to the band's works were given to the Anselmo Lorenzo Foundation of the anarchist Confederación Nacional del Trabajo. Afterwards, Morales founded the band El Noi del Sucre, referencing the nickname of the CNT trade unionist Salvador Seguí.

== Members ==
- Lorenzo Morales "El Noi": vocals.
- Antón Tochi: electric guitar.
- Jesús Mosteiros "Mosti": electric guitar and backing vocals.
- Ignacio Gallego "Chino": bass and backing vocals.
- Manuel Borrego "Lolo": drums.

== Discography ==
- Punk's not Dead´91 (1991). Demo.
- A las Barricadas (1995)
- Cualquier noche puede salir el Sol (1996)
- Los Olvidados (1997)
- Los Pobres no Tienen Patria (1999)
- Bienvenidos al infierno (2001). Live double CD.
- Rapsodia Libertaria. Volumen I (2004).
- Rapsodia Libertaria. Volumen II (2007).
- Rapsodia Libertaria. Volumen III - Doble CD (2009). Live.

== Films and books ==
- Trece años después, y esto no es un cuento de Hadas - Comic about the history of the group + La Gran Estafa Del Rock 'n' Roll (2003). Compilation of live shows and demos.
- Ladrán, luego cabalgamos (2005) - Double DVD.
- Los Muertos de cristo en imágenes (2010) - 132 minute documentary about the group.
