= Bus Station Loonies =

British cabaret punk band

The Bus Station Loonies
- Origin: Plymouth, England
- Genres: Punk; anarcho-punk; pop-punk; cabaret; punk pathetique
- Years active: 1995–present
- Labels: Ruptured Ambitions; Campary Records; Beat Bedsit; Looney Tunes; Pumpkin Records; Helen of Oi!
- Members: Chris Wheelie; Tony Popkids; Chris "The Machine" Mildren; Ad Nauseum; Charlie Menace
- Past members: Josie "Bounce" Bouche; Julie Dodger "Dirty" Gav Sanchez; Sam Ladiesman; Jessi Eastfield; Dick Lucas; Steve Poundpants; Oliver Large'un; Sean O'Porno; Aaron Sweater; Dr. Paul Tax; Ben Dur; Goz Hayter "Wild" Johnny Clipboard; The World-Famous Nuf; Dancin' Dave Worth; Dave "Spider Baby" Jones; Angus Old; Yaga; The Love Doctor

The Bus Station Loonies are a British cabaret punk band from Plymouth, England. They have been described as a cross between Splodgenessabounds and Crass. Original Loonies Tony Popkids (drums) and Chris "Felcher" Wheelchair (real name Chris Willsher b.1971 in Ilford, London) (vocals, keyboards, kazoo; ex-drummer with Oi Polloi, Disorder, Riot/Clone and DIRT, among others), sharing a mutual love of such U.S. punk outfits as The Dickies, still continue with the band today, with the current line-up having been stable for the last 15 years of the band's 30 year existence.

During their initial UK tour of April 1996, with contemporary punk bands PMT and The Filth, The Loonies were billed as "a vicious headbutt between Johnny Moped and Jello Biafra".

The band was featured in the UK's Channel 4 documentary, Punx Picnic. The Bus Station Loonies were the first band to set the official world record for the most concerts/gigs performed in 12 hours (25 different shows) on 29 Sept 2001 in and around Plymouth, Devon, UK raising money to buy musical equipment for pupils of the Dame Hannah Rogers (special needs) school in Ivybridge, Devon.

The band featured in the Guinness Book of World Records, until 2006, when the record was beaten.

Music journalist Mick Mercer's 1997 book The Hex Files: The Goth Bible, references The Bus Station Loonies for their 18-minute reggae rendition of The Sisters of Mercy composition, "Temple of Love". In October 2008, said version (from their debut album) was nominated on a live broadcast on BBC Radio 6 Music as 'one of the best cover versions of all-time' (The Music Week with Julie Cullen and Matt Everitt).

In Autumn 2010, The Bus Station Loonies completed recording their second full-length album. Entitled Midget Gems and released on their own Ruptured Ambitions record label it features eighth guitarist Angus Old (real name Phil Cawse) and the recently recruited ninth guitarist Chris "The Machine" Mildren.

The bands' latest release, More Bullshit was released in Autumn 2022, and is an official tribute to several bands featured on the Crass Records Bullshit Detector compilation LP series, originally released between 1980 and 1984.

The band's frontman, Chris Wheelie, is currently involved in a solo project Harakiri Karaoke, as well as drumming with several other bands (including The Spoils Collective, WAGs to Wytches, Eastfield, Anarcho Folko, HIV and The Positives, The Sexy Offenders and his old band, originally formed in 1989, C.D.S.).

At the end of November 2025, the band performed their final live concerts. A third, farewell studio LP is in the works for a 2027 completion, while a compilation album featuring various artists, including Culture Shock, Kavus Torabi, Disorder and others performing cover versions of Loonies compositions is due for release at the end of 2026.

== Discography ==
- "Dodgy Cider Fix" cassette (1995)
- "Squiffy on a Small Amount" 7-inch EP (Campary Records 1996)
- "Everyday Bullshit" track on A Scream From the Silence vol. 4 LP (Looney Tunes 1996)
- Split cassette with Fungi Gone West (1996)
- "In Cider We Trust" split cassette with Combat Shock (1997)
- "Save Our Cider" and "The Blacksmith's Arms" tracks on Punks, Skins and Herberts vol. 1 LP (Helen of Oi! 1997)
- "Charlie Harper" track on Bare Faced Hypocrisy Sells Records 7-inch/CD (Ruptured Ambitions 1998)
- "The Sideboard Song" track on The New Wave of Chas'n'Dave CD (Spanking Herman 1998)
- "Ensure Your Needle is Clean and Free from Dust" split 7-inch EP with Anal Beard (Ruptured Ambitions 1998)
- Mad Frank's Zonal Disco LP/CD (Ruptured Ambitions 1999)
- "The Last Post" track on It Don't Come Right to Me CD (Beat Bedsit 2000)
- "Can't Cheat Karma" track on Angry Songs and Bitter Words CD (Ruptured Ambitions 2003)
- "Hungry, Hungover and Skint" (live tape)
- "You Won't Find a Bigger Knob" (live tape)
- "The Blacksmith's Arms" track on UK Punks Vol. 1 CD (Pumpkin/EHC 2005)
- "Dick Dastardly" track on Blackpool Bounce (Through the Net 2006)
- Midget Gems CD (Ruptured Ambitions 2010)
- "Black Rat and Prosecco" Live Download (Ruptured Ambitions 2020)
- "More Bullshit" 7-inch EP/CD/Download (Ruptured Ambitions 2022)
