= Kill Your Pet Puppy =

- Editor: Tony Drayton
- Categories: Punk
- Founder: Tony Drayton
- Founded: 1979
- First issue: December 31, 1979; 46 years ago
- Final issue Number: 1984; 42 years ago 6
- Country: United Kingdom
- Based in: London
- Language: English
- Website: www.killyourpetpuppy.co.uk

Kill Your Pet Puppy (KYPP) was a UK punk zine that ran for six issues between 1979 and 1984. It was edited by Tony Drayton (Tony D) who had previously produced Ripped and Torn fanzine, which he started in October 1976 and for 18 issues until 1979.

KYPP pushed the boundaries of punk rock through a period which saw the birth of anarcho-punk and the beginnings of the goth subculture. The final issue, No. 6, described a journey from a punk squat in London to Stonehenge Free Festival. Groups featured in KYPP were Adam and the Ants, Crass, Bauhaus, Southern Death Cult, The Mob, The Associates, Charge, Sex Gang Children and the Cuddly Toys.

KYPP was written and designed in a situationist style' by a fluctuating group of around 12 members of the Puppy Collective. Influences on KYPP ranged from sixties undergrounds magazines like OZ and International Times, to Wilhelm Reich, the Angry Brigade, Aleister Crowley, Surrealism, eco-feminism and David Bowie.

The Puppy Collective were also variously active participants in events and situations of the period - including a Sid Vicious Memorial March in 1979, the Wapping Autonomy Centre in 1981/2, Centro Iberico 1982, the 1982 Stonehenge to Greenham Peace Convoy, the 1983 Stop the City protest and the early 1980s Stonehenge Free Festival.
