= Bullshit Detector =

Compilation album by Various artists
- Released: 1980–1984
- Genre: Anarcho-punk
- Label: Crass

Bullshit Detector was the name of a series of compilation LPs put together by the anarcho-punk band (and art collective) Crass and released on their Crass Records label. Three editions were released between 1980 and 1984, consisting of demo tapes, rough recordings and artwork that had been sent to the band. The sound quality of the Bullshit Detector series was mixed, and was often very basic or poor as Crass would master the tapes directly to record without any additional production or enhancement. For Crass, the expectation of a polished performance was missing the point of the DIY punk ethic:

"Don't expect music when the melody is anger, when the message sings defiance, three chords are frustration when the words are from the heart"

– Sleeve notes from Bullshit Detector Volume 3

The title Bullshit Detector was derived as a reference to the Clash song "Garageland" from their first LP The Clash, a song covered by Chumbawamba guitarist Boffo on the second volume.

The series is notable for marking the first appearance on vinyl of both Chumbawamba (on the second volume) and Napalm Death (on the third). The POWER sleeve with marker pen art was designed by Haggis, AKA David Hargreaves lead singer of Youthanasia PX.

A fourth, unofficial Bullshit Detector, this time an international compilation, was released by the Swiss independent anarcho-punk record label Resistance Productions in 1994. There have also been records released in a similar style and with similar sentiment such as the 'Bullsheep Detector' compilation of Welsh punk bands released in 2012.

== Bullshit Detector Vol 1 (1980) ==
Bullshit Detector Vol. 1

Crass Records. Catalogue no. 421984/4

1. Andy T – "Jazz on a Summers Day"
2. Counter Attack – "Don't Wanna Fight For You"
3. The Alternative – "Change It"
4. The Pranx – "2 Years 2 Late"
5. Reputations in Jeopardy – "Girls Love Popstars"
6. Crass – "Do They Owe Us a Living? (Drums and vocals only)"
7. Amebix – "University Challenged"
8. Sceptics - "Local Chaos"
9. The Sinyx – "Mark of the Beast"
10. Frenzy Battalion – "Thalidomide"
11. Icon – "Cancer"
12. The Speakers – "Why"
13. A.P.F. Brigade – "Anarchist Attack"
14. Fuck The C.I.A. – "Right or Wrong"
15. Caine Mutiny and the Kallisti Apples of Nonsense – "Morning Star"
16. The Sucks – "Three"
17. Porno Squad – "Khaki Doesn't Go with My Eyes"
18. S.P.G. Murders – "Soldiers"
19. The Eratics – "National Service"
20. Red Alert – "Who Needs Society?"
21. The Snipers – "War Song"
22. Armchair Power – "Power"
23. Disrupters – "Napalm"
24. Andy T. – "Nagasaki Mon Amour"
25. Action Frogs – "Drumming Up Hope (Ferret Skank)"

== Bullshit Detector Vol 2 (1982) ==
Crass Records - 221984/3

=== Disc one ===
Bullshit Detector Vol. 2

1. Waiting For Bardot – "Voice of U.K."
2. Omega Tribe – "Nature Wonder"
3. The Suspects – "Random Relations"
4. Your Funeral – "Think About It"
5. Kronstadt Uprising – "Receiver Deceiver"
6. Deformed – "Freedom"
7. No Label – "Let's Get It Right"
8. The Rejected – "Same Old Songs"
9. Boffo – "Garageland"
10. XS – "Fuck the System"
11. Polemic Attack – "Manipulated Youth"
12. A. Gardener – "A. Gardener's Song"
13. Toxic – "Tradition of Slaughter"
14. 1984 – "Break Up"
15. "Insert"
16. Toxik Ephex – "Police Brutality"
17. Sic – "Low"
18. Molitov Cocktail – "Ain't Got a Clue"
19. Naked – "Mid 1930s (Pre-War Germany)"

=== Disc two ===
1. Capital Punishment – "We've Realised the Truth Now"
2. Anthrax – "All the Wars"
3. Endangered Species – "Slaughter of the Innocent (Curiosity Kills)"
4. Pseudo Sadists – "War Games"
5. Total Chaos – "Psycho Analysis"
6. Dougie – "War Without Winners"
7. St. Vitus Dancers – "The Survivor"
8. Stegz – "Christus Erection"
9. Metro Youth – "Brutalised"
10. Normality Complex – "Black Market Shadow"
11. Youth in Asia – "Power & the Glory"
12. Riot Squad – "Security System"
13. Destructors – "Agent Orange"
14. The Pits – "U.K. in Dreamland"
15. The Bored – "Riot Style"
16. Toby Kettle – "Theatre Comment"
17. Chumbawamba – "Three Years Later"
18. Passion Killers – "Start Again"
19. Amerikan Arsenal – "Get Off Yr Ass"

== Bullshit Detector Vol 3 (1984) ==
Crass Records - 1984/3

=== Disc one ===
1. Avert Aversion – "Oh What a Nice Day"
2. Awake Mankind – "Once Upon a Time"
3. A Nul Noise – "Hibakusha"
4. Animus – "Nuclear Piss"
5. Peroxide – "Ministry of Death (M.O.D.)"
6. Untitled – "We Are Taught How to Kill"
7. Xtract – "(Waiting For The) Genocide"
8. Verbal Assault – "Not Yet Ron"
9. Fifth Column – "Counterfeit Culture"
10. Potential Victim – "People"
11. 7th Plague – "Rubber Bullets"
12. Rebel – "Genesis to Genocide"
13. Alienated – "Living in Fear"
14. Barbed Wire – "Weapons of War"
15. Rob Williams – "Lies"
16. Reality Control – "The War is Over"
17. Youthanasia PX – "Power"
18. Sammy Rubette + Safety Match – "The Ballad of Maggie the Maggot"
19. Politicide – "51st State"
20. Markus Abused – "The Killing Machine"

=== Disc two ===
1. One Man's Meat – "Your Country Misleads You"
2. Direct Action – "Death Without a Thought"
3. Crag – "Voice Your Protest"
4. Attrition – "In Your Hand"
5. Napalm Death – "The Crucifixion of Possessions"
6. The Impalers – "Sun, Sun, Sun"
7. Health Hazard – "Picture Show"
8. Phil Hedgehog – "Radio Times"
9. Malice – "Faceless"
10. Michael Kingzett Taylor – "Paranoia"
11. Brainwashed Pupils – "The Demonstration"
12. No Defences – "Work to Consume"
13. A.N.E.E.B. – "Berlin Wall"
14. Carnage – "Carnage"
15. Warning – "Beasts of Fiction"
16. State of Shock – "Excess Youth"
17. Neale Harmer – "Hard Nut"
18. Dead to the World – "Action Man"
19. Dandruff – "Life in a Whiskey Bottle"
20. Richard III – "Will You Care?"
21. Funky Rayguns – "The Hare and the Tortoise"

== Bullshit Detector Volume 4 (1994) ==
Jointly released by Resistance Productions (cat. no. RIP 120), Örmaal Records (ÖR 1), Mass Media Records (MMR 8) and Loony Tunes Records (TUNE 31)

=== Disc one ===
1. Hated - Gesundheit
2. Orange World - Disneyfuck
3. Necrosis: Show Me the Pure
4. Pille Allein - No Fun
5. G.U.R.K. - Ausbeuten
6. Putang-I-Nas - Radioactive Survival
7. Eric D. Thompson - An Honest Pledge
8. Little Zomki - Copies Conformes
9. Valtiokontrolli - (untitled)
10. Cheese Police - Arseholes
11. Nallekerho - Oikeutta Alkuperäiskansoille
12. Recusant - Organised Murder on a Conveyor Belt
13. Shadowed Veil - America the Beautiful
14. Katastrofialue - Päätä Vailla
15. Freak Show - Handled World
16. Autumn Poison - Utopia: A New World in Our Hearts
17. Primitiv Bunko - Certifié Conforme
18. Agente Laranja - Racista

=== Disc two ===
1. Homo Erectus - Anarchy
2. Faster Than Sheep - Bitch
3. Pichismo - Ne Ricevos Ŝtato Ĉuron
4. Yan - Heavy Metal Music
5. Mash'm - U.N.
6. Inokentijs Mārpls - Demokrátiska Dziesma
7. Marichuana - Mes Pritariam Visiems Antifašistiniams Apsireiškimams
8. Protest - War
9. Steine Für Den Frieden - Free?
10. Antitude - Hey, Mister President
11. Armed Revolution - Corporate Slave
12. Gruuthaagy - Start Insane
13. Headache - Die!
14. Love, Chips & Peace - Royal Family
15. Apatridi - Camino Para Guerra
16. Parkaj Mental - Soldat Amerikkkain
17. Naked A's - You're a Disgrace
18. Miasma: The Dirtiest Game (War)
