= Anti System =

English punk rock band

- Origin: Bradford, West Yorkshire, UK
- Genres: Anarcho punk, UK82, hardcore punk
- Years active: 1982–1986; 2014–present
- Label: Boss Tuneage
- Members: Dean Martindale; Mickey Knowles; Mark "Varik" Teale; Mark "Keaney" Keane; Kevin Frost
- Past members: Phil Dean; Dom Watts; George Clark; Dave Damned; Simon 'Nogsy' Nolan; Liam Sheeran; Mick Teale; Phil Hobson; Kev Haste

Anti System is an English punk rock band from Bradford, West Yorkshire, England.

== History ==
Formed in Bradford in 1982, the original line-up consisted of Phil, George, Dom and Dave Damned on vocals. Following their first gig at the Palm Cove in Bradford on 14 September 1982 (with Friktion Agitators, The End and Complete Disorder), Dave Damned was replaced by Nogsy (Simon Nolan). The band recorded a demo at Lion Studios in Leeds which led to them being signed to Marcus Featherby's Pax Records.

Anti System recorded a session at Cargo Studios from which the tracks Mansworld and Breakout were chosen to appear the Pax Records compilation album Punk Dead - Nah Mate, The Smell Is Jus Summink In Yer Underpants Innit in early 1983.

Their next release was the five-track Defence of the Realm EP. By this time George had been replaced on bass by former Raw guitarist Mickey Knowles although he appears on two of the five tracks.

This line-up also played on the tracks Schoolboy and Why Should It Happen which appeared on the compilation Bollox To The Gonads - Here's The Testicles, also on Pax Records.

By May 1983 Nogsy had been replaced by former Raw vocalist Liam Sheeran. During Liam's time with the band a live album was recorded but remains unreleased. Both Mickey and Liam left in 1984 and former members of the band Subvert/Morbid Humour joined a new line-up.

In 1985, Anti System released a split single Strange Love/So Long As with Morbid Humour's Oh, My God (Parts 1 & 2) on the flip side. This was followed by the No Laughing Matter album and the 12" A Look at Life EP on Reconciliation Records.

Like some other anarcho-punk bands of the time, the band were promoters of animal rights causes, their debut EP being a benefit for animal welfare groups and prior to the recording of the A Look at Life EP there was a necessity for a new line-up as two of the original members had been imprisoned for various animal rights actions. Mark Keane and Michael Teale were imprisoned in 1986, shortly after recording A Look at Life.

In 2009, a family tree and profile of the band was published in the book Bradford Noise of the Valleys Volume One - 1967-1987.

In 2012, guitarist Varik formed a new version the band with past members Mark Keane and Mickey Knowles.

== Musical style ==
The band's music has been categorised as anarcho punk and hardcore punk. In an article by DIY Conspiracy, they were referred to as one of the pioneers of UK82. Their lyrics often political, supporting anarchism and animal rights.

They have cited influences including Black Flag, Crass and Conflict.

== Members ==
Current

- Dean Martindale - Vocals
- Mickey Knowles - Guitar
- Mark "Varik" Teale - Guitar
- Mark "Keaney" Keane - Bass
- Kevin Frost - Drums

== Discography ==
=== Recordings ===
- 82 Demo (Self Release, 1982)
- In Defence of the Realm (EP, Pax Records, 1983)
- No Laughing Matter (LP, Reconcile, 1985)
- A Look at Life (12", Reconcile, 1986)
- Live At Sheffield Marples LP - Unreleased
- Split 7" w/MORBID HUMOUR (Reconcile, 1986)
- What Price Freedom (Boss Tuneage, 2017)

=== Appearances on compilations ===
- Punk Dead? Nah Mate, The Smell is Jus Summink in Yer Underpants Innit (Pax Records, 1982)

Tracks - Man's World, Aftermath

- Bollox to the Gonads - Here's the Testicles (Pax Records, 1984)

Tracks - Schoolboy, Why Should it Happen

== See also ==
- Animal rights and punk subculture
