= Schwartzeneggar =

UK musical group

- Origin: England
- Genres: Punk
- Years active: 1992 to 1995
- Labels: Rugger Bugger, GAP (Europe), Allied Recordings (USA)
- Members: Steve Ignorant, Ben Corrigan, Andi Tuck, Bob Butler, Mark Pickstone

Schwartzeneggar was a band formed by ex-Crass vocalist Steve Ignorant, Thatcher on Acid members, Ben Corrigan (guitar, b. vocals), Andi Tuck (drums), Bob Butler (bass), and former Conflict member Mark Pickstone (keyboards/guitar).

Bassist Bob Butler died in 2022.

== Discography ==
=== Albums ===
- Take Your Elbows Off The Table, EP (1993)
- The Way Things Are ... And Other Stories (1993)

=== Singles ===
- "Goodbye To All That/Child of the Times" (1992)
- "Art XX Craft"/"Sad life" (1993)
- "Take Your Elbows Off The Table"/"Today" (1993)
- "New World, New Song/I Want My Life", recorded live at MKNZ, Ilirska Bistrica, Slovenia, on 27 October 1995. (limited edition 7" yellow vinyl)
