= Blyth Power =

British rock band

- Origin: Somerset, England
- Genres: Folk punk
- Years active: 1983–present
- Labels: All the Madmen; Midnight Music; Downwarde Spiral; Anagram Records
- Members: Joseph Porter; Annie Hatcher; Dion Lay; Ben Bailey; Hugo Hatcher

Blyth Power are a British rock band formed in 1983 by singer and drummer Joseph Porter, formerly of anarcho-punk bands Zounds and the Mob. The band's music shows strong influences from punk rock and folk music and Porter's lyrics often centre on themes from mythology and history.

The band have released more than a dozen studio albums, since 1993 on their own label Downwarde Spiral Records.

== Career ==
Established in 1983 and named after a railway locomotive, the one constant in an ever-shifting lineup has been drummer, vocalist, and songwriter Joseph Porter (real name Gary Hatcher, born 21 February 1962 in Templecombe, Somerset, England), who formed the band with Curtis Youé, another former member of anarcho-punk band The Mob. The band have subsequently been through many line-up changes; their 1990 album Alnwick and Tyne featured Jamie Hince, later of The Kills, on lead guitar.

The band's first release was a cassette, A Little Touch of Harry in the Night, in 1984.

Since 1993, Blyth Power recordings have been released on their own label, Downwarde Spiral. Since 2000 they have cut back on their touring schedule due to various personal commitments, but they have organised an annual mini-festival, the Blyth Power Ashes. The festival takes place in August of each year, and combines live music with a cricket match featuring band members and their associates. From 2011 the event moved to The Plough, in Farcet Fen near Peterborough due to its ever-increasing popularity. From 2015 to 2019, The Ashes took place at The Hunters Inn in Longdon, near Tewkesbury.

Joseph Porter has also been involved with various side-projects, such as doing solo guitarist/vocalist performances and collaborating in two other bands, Red Wedding and Mad Dogs & Englishmen.

== Musical style ==
The band's lyrics often deal with episodes from history, ranging from the Trojan War to the Cod Wars, as well as aspects of English culture such as cricket, village life and trains, as well as a lot of politics. Porter is an avowed trainspotter, and in August 1998 the band appeared on the LWT religious affairs television programme Holy Smoke! in a slot in which musicians discussed their individual religions — with trainspotting cited as his religion.

== Members ==
=== Current members ===
List of current band members
Title	Details
Joseph Porter	Joined: 1983; Instrument: Drums, Lead Vocals (sometimes plays acoustic guitar)
Annie Hatcher	Joined: 1995; Instrument: Keyboards, Harmony Vocals
Ben Bailey	Joined: 2014; Instrument: Bass
Hugo Hatcher	Joined: 2019; Instrument: Guitar
Dion Lay	Joined: 2023; Instrument: Guitar

=== Former members ===
List of former band members
Title	Details
Neil Keenan	Joined: 1983; Left: 1986; Instrument: Guitar
Curtis Youe	Joined: 1983; Left: 1986; Instrument: Bass
Andy Morgan	Joined: 1985; Left: 1986; Instrument: Harmony Vocals
Sarah Lewington	Joined: 1985; Left: 1986; Instrument: Harmony Vocals
Martin "Protag" Neish	Joined: 1987; Left: 1998; Instrument: Bass
Steve Ardcorr	Joined: 1987; Left: 1988; Instrument: Guitar
Jamie Hince	Joined: 1987; Left: 1990; Instrument: Guitar
Sian Jeffreys	Joined: 1987; Left: 1988; Instrument: Harmony Vocals
Julie Dalkin	Joined: 1988; Left: 1990; Instrument: Harmony Vocals
Helen Rush	Joined: 1988; Left: 1990; Instrument: Harmony Vocals
Wob Williams	Joined: 1990; Left: 1994; Instrument: Guitar, Harmony Vocals
Darren Tansley	Joined: 1990; Left: 1995; Instrument: Keyboards, Harmony Vocals
John Rutherford	Joined: 1994; Left: 1997; Instrument: Guitar, Harmony Vocals
Chris Hopkins	Joined: 1997; Left: 1998; Instrument: Guitar
Andrew "Jessi" Adams	Joined: 1998; Left: 2001; Instrument: Guitar
Bambi	Joined: 1998; Left: 2003; Instrument: Bass
Gary Miller	Joined: 2001; Left: 2001; Instrument: Guitar
Steven Cooper	Joined: 2001; Left: 2014; Instrument: Guitar
Jerry Hellfire	Joined: 2002; Left: 2022; Instrument: Bass (2002-2014), Guitar (2014-2022)
Jack Ellis	Joined: 2022; Left: 2022; Instrument: Guitar

== Discography ==
=== Studio albums ===
List of studio albums, with selected chart positions
Title	Album details	Peak chart positions
Title	Album details	UK Indie
A Little Touch of Harry in the Night	Released: 1984; Label: 96 Tapes; Formats:	–
Wicked Women, Wicked Men and Wicket Keepers	Released: 1987; Label: All the Madmen Records; Formats:	6
The Barman and Other Stories	Released: 1988; Label: Midnight Music Records; Formats:	–
Alnwick and Tyne	Released: 1990; Label: Midnight Music Records; Formats:	–
The Guns of Castle Cary	Released: 1991; Label: Midnight Music Records; Formats:	–
Karpov Crosses the Border	Released: Recorded 1992, but unreleased until c.2000; Label: Formats:	–
Pastor Skull	Released: 1993; Label: Downwarde Spiral Records; Formats:	–
Paradise Razed	Released: 1995; Label: Downwarde Spiral Records; Formats:	–
Out from Under the King	Released: 1996; Label: Downwarde Spiral Records; Formats:	–
The Bricklayer's Arms	Released: 2000; Label: Downwarde Spiral Records; Formats:	–
On the Viking Station	Released: 2002; Label: Downwarde Spiral Records; Formats:	–
Fall of Iron	Released: 2006; Label: Downwarde Spiral Records; Formats:	–
Land Sea & Sky	Released: 2009; Label: Downwarde Spiral Records; Formats:	–
Women and Horses and Power and War	Released: 2014; Label: Downwarde Spiral Records; Formats:	–
The Power Behind the Throne	Released: 2023; Label: Downwarde Spiral Records; Formats:	–

=== Live albums ===
List of live albums
Title	Album details
A Rededication of Pastor Skull	Released: 1997; Label: Downwarde Spiral Records; Formats:
Gladly Give to Caesar	Released: 1999; Label: Downwarde Spiral Records; Formats:

=== Compilation albums ===
List of compilation albums
Title	Album details
Pont Au-Dessus de la Brue	Released: 1989; Label: Midnight Music Records; Formats:
Ten Years Inside the Horse	Released: 1994; Label: Anagram Records; Formats:

=== Singles ===
List of singles
Title	Album details
"Chevy Chase"	Released: 1985; Label: All the Madmen Records; Formats:
"Junction Signal"	Released: 1986; Label: All the Madmen Records; Formats:
"Ixion"	Released: 1986; Label: All the Madmen Records; Formats:
"Up from the Country"	Released: 1988; Label: Midnight Music; Formats:
"Goodbye to All That"	Released: 1988; Label: Midnight Music; Formats:
"Better to Bat"	Released: 1990; Label: Midnight Music; Formats:
"A Wild Card to Play"	Released: 1995; Label: Downwarde Spiral Records; Formats:

=== Compilation appearances ===
- "Reality Asylum" - cover version of the song by Crass on the compilation album You've Heard It All Before (1993)

=== Related albums ===
- When Death Went to Bed with a Lady (1998, Joseph Porter solo album)
- Going Down with Alice (2000, album by Mad Dogs and Englishmen, including Joseph Porter)
- Red Wedding (2004, acoustic album by Steven Cooper and Joseph Porter)

=== Videos ===
- Do the One About the Horse (1992)
- Live in Harlow (1995)
