= Zounds =

English anarcho-punk/post-punk band

- Origin: Reading, Berkshire, England
- Genres: Anarcho-punk; post-punk
- Years active: 1977–1982; 2001–2025
- Labels: Crass Records; Rough Trade Records; Overground Records
- Members: Steve Lake; Paul Gilbert; Joe Davin; Dominic Perez-Silva
- Website: www.zoundsonline.co.uk

Zounds were an English anarcho punk/post-punk band from Reading, Berkshire, formed in 1977. Originally they were part of the cassette culture movement, releasing material on the Fuck Off Records label, and were also involved in the squatting and free festival scene. The name of the band is derived from the old English minced oath "zounds", a contraction of "God's wounds", referring to the crucifixion wounds of Jesus Christ, formerly used as a mildly blasphemous oath.

== History ==
The band were formed around the nucleus of Steve Lake from Reading, Berkshire and evolved from a number of jamming sessions with other musicians and friends in Oxford, taking in influences from the Velvet Underground to the Sex Pistols. The band began performing gigs in 1977/78 with a line-up of Steve Lake (vocals/bass), Steve Burch (guitar) and Jimmy Lacey (drums), adding Nick Godwin (guitar) at their second gig – adopting the name 'Zounds', chosen from a dictionary by Burch. Soon, Burch left the group and was replaced by Laurence Wood. After this the band slowly became more politicized owing to troubles with police and unfolding events of the Cold War, and became more and more involved with free festivals, alongside The Mob, with whom they developed a close association.

The band met up with fellow anarchists Crass when, legend has it, their van broke down on the road. They made their way to nearby Dial House, where Crass were based, who helped them with repairs. The two bands became friends, and although musically very divergent, they shared many common political views. After undergoing several line-up changes Zounds shortly afterwards released their first EP, Can't Cheat Karma, on the Crass Records label (although drummer Josef was replaced for the recording by a session drummer) in 1980. The EP featured possibly their most well-known track "Subvert", a call to arms against the grind of daily life. The release of this EP and association with Crass led to an increase in the band's profile in the embryonic anarcho-punk scene, touring with both Crass and the Poison Girls, as well as performing several squat gigs in West Berlin.

The band released their first album The Curse of Zounds on Rough Trade Records in 1981, recording and mixing the LP within five days. The cover art, by anarchist artist Clifford Harper, featured a painting of fire fighters apparently trying to put out a blaze at the Houses of Parliament in Westminster. However, the picture continued onto the back cover, which showed that in fact they are spraying the fire with petrol, thus feeding it. The band released three more singles on Rough Trade, Demystification (a psychedelia-influenced track backed with "Great White Hunter"), Dancing and More Trouble Coming Every Day, as well Le Vache Qui Rit (initially intended for a split EP with The Mob for an anti-draft benefit in Belgium).

The band split up in late 1982, Steve Lake disaffected with the anarchist music scene in general and the band worn out from touring. Bass player and vocalist Steve Lake and guitarist Laurence Wood continued to work together for a while as The World Service with original Zounds member Nick Godwin, whilst drummer Josef Porter joined The Mob and later Blyth Power. Lake continued work as a solo artist recording two albums with Nick Godwin and Brian Pugsley. Zounds occasionally reform for benefit gigs with a line-up augmented by Protag (formerly of Instant Automatons, Alternative TV and Blyth Power) and drummer Stick (previously of Dirt, Doom and Extreme Noise Terror). A remixed version of the band's song "This Land" was released in 2001 as a CD single benefit for the McLibel support campaign. In 2005 the Go All The Way EP was released with tracks from an aborted second album, with tracks commenting on the USA's war on terror.

In 2007 Zounds reformed. Steve Lake recruited Paul O'Donnell (bass) and Paul Gilbert (drums) from The Evil Presleys, a "primal rock n roll" band that they were in together (with guitarist Andy Parker). The reformed Zounds then played sporadic gigs over the next two years including "The Feeding of the 5000" at Shepherd's Bush Empire in London and the Carling Academy, Birmingham (both with guitarist Dominic Dominion).

In 2010 the band began playing more extensively across the UK and Europe, completing two short European tours. The first was for a week in April (the Netherlands and Belgium) and the second was from 17 September to 3 October mainly in Germany, plus gigs in the Netherlands, Poland and Italy.

In 2011, they completed a new album, The Redemption of Zounds, which was available for download from 10 July, on CD from 26 July on Overground Records and on vinyl in the US on Brokenrekids from September that year.

The band split up again in 2025, playing their final show headlining Search For The Sun festival at Toscadura in Montreal on November 1st 2025. Steve Lake had officially labelled it "the last time I perform with Zounds" earlier in the year.

== Final line-up ==
- Steve Lake – lead vocals, guitar
- Joe Davin – bass guitar, backing vocals
- Paul Gilbert – drums, backing vocals
- Dominic Perez-Silva - guitar

== Original band line-up ==
- Steve Lake – vocals, bass guitar
- Laurence Wood – guitar
- Josef Porter – drums
- Artwork – "Dr Inadequate Phuck"

== Discography ==
- "Zounds! You Can't Cheat Karma" (EP, 1980, Crass Records)
- The Curse of Zounds (LP, 1981, Rough Trade Records)
- "Demystification / Great White Hunter" (Single, 1982, Rough Trade Records)
- "Dancing / True Love" (Single, 1982, Rough Trade Records)
- "Le Vache Qui Rit" (EP, 1982, Not So Brave Records)
- "More Trouble Coming Every Day/ Knife" (Single, 1983, Rough Trade Records)
- The Curse of Zounds (CD reissue, including all other tracks previously released as singles or EPs by the band, 1993, Gap Recordings\Rugger Bugger Records)
- "This Land" (CD remix single, a benefit for the McLibel Support Campaign, 2001, Active Distribution)
- "Go All The Way" (EP, 2005, ZNDS Records)
- "The Curse of Zounds Discography" (CD, 2007, Album and singles "remastered" by the band, Active Distribution)
- "The Redemption Of Zounds" (LP, 2011, Overground/Plastic Head Records)

== See also ==
- Anarcho-punk
