= Disorder (band) =

English street punk band

- Origin: Bristol, England
- Genres: Hardcore Punk, Crust Punk
- Years active: 1980–present
- Labels: Disorder; Anagram; Strong Mind Japan; Black Konflik
- Members: Taf (Phil Lovering); Danny disorder; Alex Upchuck
- Past members: jon; Chris "Boobs" Neil; Steve Curtis; Steve Allen; Neil "Virus" Worthington; Nick Peters; Steve Robinson; Yaga; Goz; Chris Wheelie/Chris Willsher; Kenneth Eggen; Rudy Hoykens; TK; Tor Degerstrøm; Stian Løken; Gunnar Holm

Disorder are an English street punk band that formed in the Bristol area of England in 1980, and has existed with varying line-ups. They are aligned with politically charged punk bands.

Disorder were part of the "protest punk" movement, and were one of the bands that spearheaded the Bristol punk scene in the early 1980s. The BBC DJ John Peel described their early singles as sounding like Triumph Bonneville motorbikes.

== History ==
Disorder formed in 1980 in Bristol. The original line-up was Steve Curtis (vocals), Steve Allen (guitar), Nick Peters (bass guitar), and Virus (drums), although Steve Robinson soon replaced Peters, and this line-up recorded the first two EPs by the band.

The band sent a demo tape to local punk label Riot City Records, but the label opted not to sign them, and instead they formed their own Disorder Records label along with Heartbeat Records and Riot City boss Simon Edwards.

A series of events led to line-up changes: Robinson (sometimes erroneously referred to as "Robertson") split up with girlfriend Beki Bondage (of Vice Squad) and began glue-sniffing and moved to Berlin. Virus got into trouble with the police over the ownership of his new drumkit, and Dean also left. Boobs (Chris Neill) replaced him on vocals and when Steve Robinson left, Taf (Phil Lovering, formerly of The X-Certs), took over bass guitar. Drumming was taken over by Potsy (Richard Potts formerly the drummer with Chaos UK). Taf would be the only constant member of the band in the following years, which saw an ever-changing line-up.

The band's debut album, Under the Scalpel Blade, was released in 1984. The band relocated to Norway in the mid-1980s, where they recorded a split album with Kafka Prosess.

The band became popular across Europe, the United States, and Japan. Re-issues of the band's back-catalogue led to renewed interest, and the band issued a new album in 2005, Kamikaze, considered by allmusic's Stewart Mason "as brash and invigorating as any of Disorder's earlier releases".

The longest standing member of the band Taf (bassist/guitarist) normally assembles other musicians to record albums or go on tour. Steve Robinson died in March 2021 as a homeless person in Berlin, a few days before his 58th birthday.

Chris (Boobs) Neill struggled with addiction for many years before moving to Spain where he now works as a psychologist. He is active in the music scene and participated in the opening and running of a squated music school in the deprived area of Vallecas in Madrid. He now dedicates himself to playing in his new band The Self-Saboteurs.

In recent years, the band have toured extensively in Europe.

== Discography ==
Chart placings shown are from the UK Indie Chart.

=== Singles and EPs ===
- Complete Disorder EP (Disorder, 1981) (No. 29)
- Distortion to Deafness EP (Disorder, 1981) (No. 9)
- "Perdition"-8 songs 12". (Disorder Records) 1982 (No. 25)
- Mental Disorder EP (Disorder, 1983) (No. 16)
- More Noize EP (Filthy Fucking Punx, 1988)
- Pain, Headache, Depression EP (Trujaca Fala, 1994)
- We're Still Here (Counteract Recordings 2002)
- Kamikaze (Anagram, 2005)
- Dawn of the Miserables (Split with Vivere Merda, 2014)
- UK V's Japan Noizecore Wars - Disorder/Stagnation split EP. eight songs. Strong Mind Japan 2015.
- Joint – Disorder/The Babes split 7-inch EP. Disorder (UK) and The Babes (UK/France). Released on Life of Strife Productions, 2021. Discogs entry – Official band site

=== Albums ===
- Under the Scalpel Blade (Disorder Records], 1984) (No. 7)
- Gi Faen I Nasjonaliteten Din Live (Live in Oslo) (Disorder, 1985) (No. 18)
- One Day Son, All This Will Be Yours (Disorder, 1986) (split with Kafka Prosess)
- Violent World (Disorder, 1989)
- Masters of the Glueniverse (Desperate Attempt, 1991) (split with Mushroom Attack)
- Senile Punks.. (Bastard records, Slovakia. 1991)
- Sliced Punx on Meathooks (Anagram, 1997)
- Dawn of the miserables, disorder/vivere merda split lp
- UK V's Japan Noizecore Wars 2, disorder/stagnation split CD - Strong Mind Japan 2015
- Human Cargo CD Album, Disorder Records. 2016.
- Live In Sneek - Cassette Album, Black Konflik Records. 2016.
- Viva El Squato CD Album - Strong Mind Japan 2018

==== Reissues and collections ====
- Complete Disorder: The Singles 12" EP (Disorder, 1984)
- Under the Scalpel Blade/One Day Son... CD (Anagram, 1995)
- Senile Punks (Bastard Records, Czech republic circa 1994)
- Live in Oslo/Violent World CD (Anagram, 1995)
- The Rest Home for Senile Old Punks Proudly Present... Disorder (Anagram, 1996)
- Driller Killer – The Collection CD (Cleopatra, 1995)
- The Best of Disorder CD (Anagram, 1998)
- Total Disorder (Dead Ringer, 2003)
- Riot City Years 81 – 83 (Step 1, 2005)

=== Compilation appearances ===
- Punk and Disorderly LP (Abstract/Posh Boy, 1982): "Complete Disorder"
- Punk and Disorderly vol. 2 LP (Anagram, 1983): "More than Fights
- UK/DK LP (Cherry Red, 1983): "Life"
- Blitz Hits 2LP (1989): "Today's World"
- I Kill What I Eat CD (Eccocentric, 1993): "Violent World"
- We Are Gonna Fight Back Against The Pig Bastards Until We Are Dead CD (Fight Men, ?): ?
- "Euthanasia #2-The Sticky Solution" CD-Wild Arena Records. Bristol Punk Compilation 2016.

=== DVDs ===
- 20 Years in a Van (Cherry Red, 2007)
- Live in Yugoslavia 1988 (Disorder Film)
- Lve at the Queens Head (Disorder film)

Compilation appearances

- Burning Britain: The History of UK Punk 1980-1984 – The DVD (2004) Cherry Red: "Life"

== Band line-ups ==
- 1979 Complete Disorder Stephen Curtis/Steve Allen/Neil Worthington/Nick Peters
- 1981 Distortion til Deafness Stephen Curtis/Steve Allen/Neil Worthington/Steve Robinson
- 1982 Perdition Taf (bass), Steve Allen (guitar), Chris Neill (vocals) & Richard Potts (drums)
- 1983 Mental Disorder Chris Neill (vocals, Steve Allen (guitar), Taf (bass), Richard Potts (drums)
- 1984 Under the Scalpel Blade Taf (bass), Steve Allen (guitar), Chris Neil (vocals) & Richard Potts (drums)
- 1985 Taf (bass), Steve Allen (guitar), Neill (vocals) & Glen ? (drums)
- 1986 One Day Son... Taf (bass & vocals), Steve Allen (guitar) & Carl Allsop (drums)
- 1989 Violent World Taf (bass & vocals), Steve Allen (guitar) & Kenneth Eggen (drums)
- 1992 Masters of the Glueniverse Taf (bass & vocals), Steve Allen (guitar), Rudy Hoykens (vocals) & Tor Degerstrøm (drums), TK ? (other guitars)
- 2000–2002 Taf (bass/vocals), Goz (guitar), Yaga (guitar) and Chris Wheelie (of The Bus Station Loonies and Oi Polloi) (drums)
- 2002–2007 Taf (guitar and vocals), Nick Ellis (bass guitar), Jon Springer (drums)
- 2007 Taf (guitar and vocals), Nick Ellis (bass guitar), Toni/Ben (drums)
- 2008 Taf (guitar/bass, vocals), Nick Ellis (bass guitar), Ben (drums), Nikos Pappos (guitar)
- 2009 Taf (bass guitar and vocals), Nick Ellis (guitar), Ben (drums)
- 2010 Taf (bass and vocal), Ben (drums), William Melrose (guitar)
- 2011 Taf (bass guitar and vocals), Nick Ellis (ex Bad Blood and Shock Treatment) (guitar), John Springer (ex Bad Blood and The Yuk Yuks) (drums)
- 2013 UK vs Japan Noise Core Wars Taf (bass guitar and vocals), Jon Springer (drums), Nick Ellis (guitar)
- 2015 UK vs Japan Noise Core Wars II Taf (bass guitar and vocals), Jon (drums), Alex Upchuck (ex Thunderdump and Demonic Upchucks) (guitar)
- 2016 Human Cargo Taf (bass guitar and vocals), Jon (drums), Alex Upchuck (guitar)
- 2017 Live On The Greenline CD Album, Disorder Records. Taf (bass guitar and vocals), Carl Allsop (drums), Alex Upchuck (guitar), Ted (controller)
- 2018 Viva El Squato Taf (bass guitar and vocals), Jon (drums), Alex Upchuck (guitar)

== See also ==
- List of bands from Bristol
- Disorder Records
- Heartbeat Productions
- Riot City Records
