= The Mob (British band) =

English anarcho-punk band

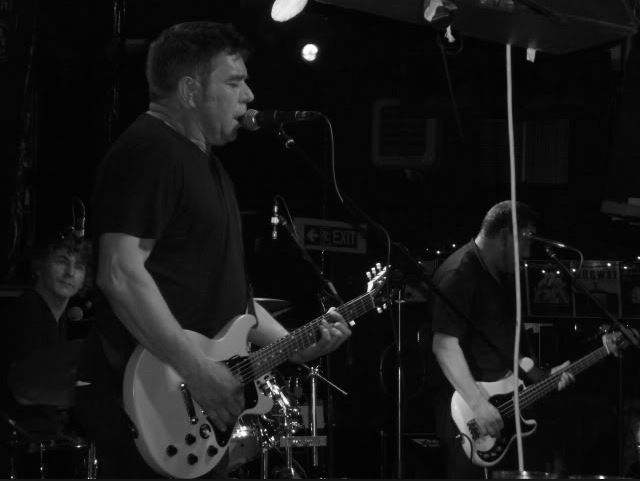

Background information
- Origin: England
- Genres: Anarcho-punk
- Years active: 1979–1983, 2011–present
- Labels: Crass, All the Madmen
- Members: Mark Wilson; Curtis Youé; Graham Fallows
- Past members: Sid Sealey; Adie Tompkins; Tim Hutton; Joseph Porter

The Mob are an English anarcho-punk band, formed in Yeovil, Somerset in the late 1970s.

== History ==
The band's initial line-up consisted of Mark Wilson (vocals, guitar), Curtis Youé (bass guitar) and Graham Fallows (drums). Later drummers included Adie Tompkins, Tim Hutton and Joseph Porter.

The group produced a fanzine titled All the Madmen from 1978 onwards, named after a track by that title on David Bowie's 1970 album The Man Who Sold The World. The Mob's first two singles "Crying Again" and "Witch Hunt" were released on the group's own label All the Madmen Records in 1980.

Mark Wilson and Curtis Youé relocated to London in 1981 and continued the group there.

The third single "No Doves Here" was released on Crass Records in 1982. The band's only album Let the Tribe Increase was released on All The Madmen in 1983. Profits from the LP were ploughed back into the label, co-organised by members of the collective that published the Kill Your Pet Puppy zine.

In late 1983 the group disbanded.

== Reunion ==
The Mob reunited in 2011 with the band’s original line-up. Wilson had heard of a surprise party planned for his upcoming birthday that was to feature a The Mob cover band and decided he would rather perform himself. The original members of the band agreed to join him. Prior to this reunion Wilson stated that he had not touched a guitar in 20 years.

The first gig for the reformed group was on 8 April 2011 at The Fleece in Bristol and later in the year, The Levellers' Beautiful Days Festival in Devon on 20 August. North American shows followed in October 2012, and various European gigs in 2012/13. Their first new release in almost 30 years was the single Rise Up! in August 2013. Further North American/European dates followed in 2014/15.

After gigs around the UK the band played in various countries across Europe. A tour of the US and Canada followed in 2012 which included headlining the 'Chaos in Tejas' festival in Austin, Texas.

== Legacy ==
Penny Rimbaud of Crass has described "No Doves Fly Here" as "one of the most beautiful singles of the punk era" and the song was referred to in a retrospective on anarcho-punk in The Quietus as "as close to a magnum opus as the genre ever achieved."

== Discography ==
=== Singles ===
Release	Year	Information
"Crying Again" / "Youth"	1980	MAD 001 - Recorded on 5 November 1979 at the Crypt Stevenage. Mixed by Grant Showbiz.
"Witch Hunt" / "Shuffling Souls"	1980	MAD 002
"No Doves Fly Here" / "I Hear You Laughing"	1981	Crass Records - Recorded and Mixed at Southern Studios, London.
"The Mirror Breaks" / "Stay"	1983	MAD 006
"Crying Again!"	1986	MAD 13 12" Reissue of the first single with additional live tracks.
"Rise Up!" / "There's Nothing You've Got I Want"	2013	MAD 023

=== Albums ===
Release	Year	Information
Ching	1980	Demo Tape (self released)
Let the Tribe Increase	1983	MAD 004
The Mob & The Apostles - Live At The LMC	1983	Cause For Concern

=== Compilations ===
Release	Year	Information
Crass Records - A SIDES, Part 1 1982-1984	1984	Track 2: "No Doves Fly Here"
Limited Edition Package (12" + 2x7" + Box)	1987	MAD PACK 001
May Inspire Revolutionary Acts	2007	Overground Records OVER115VPCD
