= Anarcho-punk =

Subgenre of punk rock

- Other names: Anarchist punk
- Stylistic origins: Punk rock
- Cultural origins: Late 1970s, United Kingdom

Subgenres
- Peace punk

Fusion genres
- Crust punk; digital hardcore

Other topics
- Anarchism; anarchism in the arts; CrimethInc.; folk punk; gutter punk; hardcore punk; punk ideologies; punk subculture; Red and Anarchist black metal; Red and Anarchist Skinheads; street punk

Anarcho-punk (also known as anarchist punk) is an ideological subgenre of punk rock that promotes anti-capitalist anarchism. The term has been broadly applied to refer to any punk music with anarchist lyrical content, which may figure in crust punk, hardcore punk, folk punk, and other styles.

== History ==
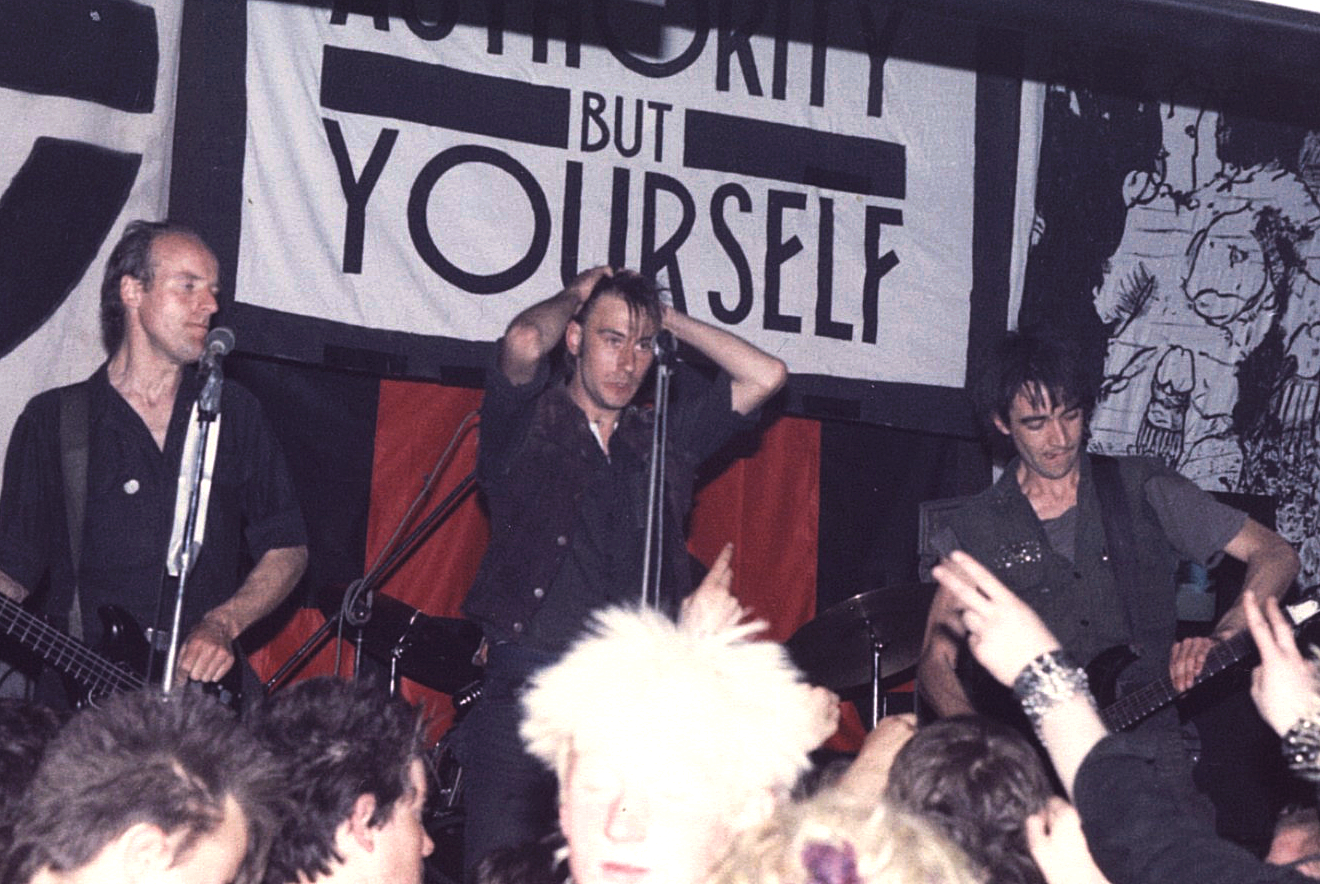
Crass, shown here in 1984, played a major role in introducing anarchism to the punk subculture.

=== Forerunners ===
During the 1960s to early 1970s, some artists who were later retroactively described as "proto-punk" became influenced by New Left or anarchist ideology, which included David Peel who was associated with the Yippie movement, alongside bands such as the MC5, the Fugs, the Edgar Broughton Band, Mick Farren's the Deviants, Pink Fairies and Hawkwind. These bands set a precedent for mixing radical politics with rock music and established the idea of rock as an agent of social and political change in the public consciousness. Other influences include avant-garde art and political movements such as Fluxus, Dada, the Beat Generation, Youth International Party, England's angry young men (such as Joe Orton), the surrealism-inspired Situationist International, the 1967 March on the Pentagon, the May 1968 uprising in Paris, and the Campaign for Nuclear Disarmament.

Jello Biafra of the Dead Kennedys has cited the Yippies as an influence on his activism and thinking.

=== Origins ===
A surge of popular interest in anarchism occurred during the 1970s in the United Kingdom following the birth of punk rock, in particular the Situationist-influenced Sex Pistols manager Malcolm McLaren and graphics artist Jamie Reid, as well as that band's first single, "Anarchy in the U.K.". Crass and the Poison Girls funded the rented Wapping Autonomy Centre with a benefit single and this then inspired other squatted self-managed social centres in London such as the Ambulance Station on Old Kent Road, Centro Iberico, the Peace Center on 99-119 Rosebery Avenue (later for a while home to Amnesty International London), Molly's Café on Upper Street and the Bingo Hall opposite Highbury & Islington station (now the Garage). The concept (and aesthetics) of anarcho-punk was quickly picked up on by bands like Flux of Pink Indians, Subhumans and Conflict.

By the early 1980s, an anarcho-punk scene emerged in Leeds spearheaded by groups such as Abrasive Wheels, the Expelled and Icon A.D. From this scene came Chumbawamba, whose emphasis on confrontational political activism soon overtook their connection to the scene. Despite their anti-corporate views, the group signed to EMI, leading to their 1997 single "Tubthumping" reaching number 2 on the UK Singles Chart.

Pioneering crust punk bands Antisect, Anti System, Sacrilege and Amebix all began in the anarcho-punk scene, before incorporating their anarchist lyrical themes with elements of early heavy metal. Early British grindcore bands like Carcass, Napalm Death and Extreme Noise Terror were primarily a part of the 1980s anarcho-punk scene, however began embracing elements of extreme metal and American thrashcore.

Social and legal conditions in the UK at the time, such as "cheap housing, lenient squatting laws and welfare benefits adequate to live on", allowed these bands to flourish. Dunstan Bruce of Chumbawumba said "we took the dole as a full-time wage underpinning our activism [...] We pooled our resources; that money powered the band and our printing press in the squat basement. We printed leaflets for local campaigns and activist groups".

=== International development ===
==== United States ====
Anarcho-punk spread to the United States in the late 1970s with groups like Austin's MDC and San Francisco's Dead Kennedys. Los Angeles' Black Flag also embraced anarchists politics between 1982 and 1986, when Henry Rollins was their vocalist. United States anarcho-punk generally supported revolutions in Latin America and anti-Apartheid movements and criticised the Presidency of Ronald Reagan.

In the 1980s, New York City cultivated a thriving anarcho-punk scene. Beginning as a part of the larger New York hardcore scene, bands like Reagan Youth, False Prophets and Heart Attack made use of a similar musical style and mentality to their British counterparts. This scene split from New York hardcore as the decade progressed. Nausea were a key figure in the scene during this period, helping to cultivate a new scene in the city based around politics and squatting.

The anarcho-punk fanzine and record label Profane Existence, founded in Minneapolis, became a "significant banner holder" for American scenes, particularly crust. Plan-It-X Records and affiliated bands such as This Bike is a Pipe Bomb and Imperial Can were associated with a folk punk scene that operated as a facet of anarcho-punk.

In the 1990s in Philadelphia, Pennsylvania, a number of collectively organised squats, houses and venues hosted shows, political events and parties. Venues included the Calvary Church, Stalag 13, The Killtime, and the First Unitarian Church. Bands such as R.A.M.B.O., Mischief Brew, Flag of Democracy, Limp Wrist, Paint It Black, and Kid Dynamite were based in the city. In West Philadelphia, punks also staffed the local food cooperatives and activist spaces – such as A-Space and LAVA Zone, where groups such as Food Not Bombs and Books Through Bars would operate.

In the 2000s, American anarcho-punk groups like Anti-Flag and Against Me gained significant mainstream success for the genre.

==== Iceland ====
In the 1980s Einar Örn, who had been studying in London, booked the English band Crass to play in Reykjavík. Örn formed the avant-garde anarcho-punk band KUKL, which also counted Björk as a member. They recorded for Crass Records and scored several British indie hits, and toured Britain with Flux of Pink Indians. They later regrouped as the core of pop band The Sugarcubes who signed to the One Little Indian label which was founded by Derek Birkett of Flux.

==== Indonesia ====
After the fall of the New Order regime in the late 1990s, anarcho-punk collectives such as Marjinal and Taring Babi have become the "public face of anarchism" in Indonesia. These groups and their genre's fans consist of mostly poor, urban youths in cities like Jakarta, Bandung, and Yogyakarta. Underground music scenes in Java, Sumatera and Bali became "an important centre for radical left activism", with the ideology becoming "dominant in the local music scene". From it emerged punk collectives with leftist views, such as the Anti-Fascist Front in Bandung, and the Anti-Oppression Front in Surabaya. In 2007 street punks Budi Khaironi and Bowo, and humanitarian activist Ahmad Zaki formed the band Punk Muslim in Jakarta in 2007, pairing punk music and activism with Islamic religious education. Another anarchist punk band is Sukatani, though stylistically their music is more electro-punk or electronic post-punk.

==== Italy ====
The Virus was a squat in Milan in the 1980s. It was a hub of a network of anarcho-punk collectives that extended all over Italy, with connections and contacts throughout Europe. In April 1982 it held the Offensiva di Primavera ('Spring Offensive'), a music festival which invited over 50 bands for a three-day event that was attended by thousands of people. Bands to play at the squat included Wretched and Negazione. It produced a zine titled Anti-Utopia.

Attack Punk Records was founded in Bologna in 1981 by Helena Velena, Laura Carroli, and Carlo Chiapparini to put out records by their anarchist hardcore punk band RAF Punk.

==== Poland ====
Anarcho-punk bands from Poland include Włochaty and Dezerter. Dezerter were explicitly anarchist, and expressed this in interviews, and in their lyrics and imagery.

==== Spain ====
The Spanish bands Sin Dios and Los Muertos de Cristo influenced a range of punk scenes in both Europe and Latin America.

== Ideology ==
Anarcho-punk bands often disassociated themselves from established anarchist currents like collectivist anarchism, anarcho-syndicalism or anarcho-communism. Because of this, as well as their emphasis on pacifism, the scene was generally independent of the wider anarchist movement at the time. Bands generally supported animal rights, anti-corporatism, labour rights and the anti-war movement. Some of the tensions with more established political campaign groups were seen in the co-optation by Crass of the Campaign for Nuclear Disarmament logo in the late 1970s and early 1980s, and the band's mostly unsuccessful attempts to work with CND.

Anarcho-punks have criticised the flaws of the punk movement and the wider youth culture. Bands like Crass and Dead Kennedys have written songs that attack corporate co-option of the punk subculture, people who are deemed to have sold out, and the violence between punks, skinheads, B-boys, other youth subcultures, and within punk itself. Some anarcho-punks are straight edge, claiming that alcohol, tobacco, drugs and promiscuity are instruments of oppression and are self-destructive because they cloud the mind and wear down a person's resistance to other types of oppression. Some also condemn the waste of land, water and resources necessary to grow crops to make alcohol, tobacco and drugs, forfeiting the potential to grow and manufacture food. Some may be straight edge for religious reasons, such as in the case of Christian, Muslim, and Buddhist anarcho-punks (see Anarchism and religion for more background).

Although Crass initially espoused pacifism, this is not necessarily the case for all anarcho-punks. Despite the broader punk subculture's antagonism towards hippies, the ideals of the hippie counterculture were an influence on anarcho-punk. Crass were explicit regarding their associations with the hippie counterculture, and this influence has also carried over to crust punk.

=== Direct action ===
Anarcho-punks universally believe in direct action, although the way in which this manifests itself varies greatly. Despite their differences in strategy, anarcho-punks often co-operate with each other. Many anarcho-punks are pacifists (e.g. Crass and Discharge) and therefore believe in using non-violent means of achieving their aims. These include nonviolent resistance, refusal of work, squatting, economic sabotage, dumpster diving, graffiti, culture jamming, ecotage, freeganism, boycotting, civil disobedience, hacktivism and subvertising. Some anarcho-punks believe that violence or property damage is an acceptable way of achieving social change (e.g. Conflict). This manifests itself as rioting, vandalism, wire cutting, hunt sabotage, participation in Animal Liberation Front, Earth Liberation Front, or even Black Bloc style activities, and in extreme cases, bombings. Many anarchists dispute the applicability of the term "violence" to describe destruction of property, since they argue that destruction of property is done not to control an individual or institution but to take its control away.

==== Stop The City ====
A coalition of anarcho-punk musicians and fans, including members of Crass and Chumbawumba, organised the Stop The City protests in the 1980s. The first of which was on September 29th, 1983, when several thousand activists occupied London's financial district. A second took place on March 29th, 1984. Further actions were held in London, Bristol, Glasgow, Leeds and Birmingham.

Punk scholar Rich Cross says echoes of these protests were felt in the later anti-globalisation protests in Seattle, the Reclaim the Streets protests, and the worldwide Occupy movement.

A large trade union demonstration in support of the 1984 Miners' Strike was held in London on the same day as the second protest, with "no effort made" to integrate the two events. Cross has written that the UK anarcho-punk scene in the 1980s' inability to develop a meaningful alliance with the trade union movement in the midst of a historic strike "highlighted not only the weaknesses in the culture's ability to broker alliances, but also… its lack of interest [in] a wider common cause".

=== DIY punk ethic ===
Many anarcho-punk bands subscribe to a "do-it-yourself" (DIY) ethic. A popular anarcho-punk slogan is "DIY not EMI," a conscious rejection of a major record company. Many anarcho-punk bands were showcased on the Bullshit Detector series of LPs released by Crass Records and Resistance Productions between 1980 and 1994. Some anarcho-punk performers were part of the cassette culture. This allowed artists to bypass the traditional recording and distribution routes, with recordings often being made available in exchange for a blank tape and a self-addressed envelope. The anarcho-punk movement has its own network of fanzines, punk zines, and self-published books which disseminate news, ideas and artwork from the scene. These are DIY productions, tending to be produced in runs of hundreds at most. The 'zines are printed on photocopiers or duplicator machines, and distributed by hand at punk concerts, in radical bookstores and infoshops, and through the mail.

== Musical style and aesthetics ==
Anarcho-punk bands are often less focused on particular musical delivery and more focused on a totalised aesthetic that encompasses the entire creative process, from album and concert art, to political message, and to the lifestyles of the band members. Crass listed as band members the people who did their album art and live visuals. The message is considered to be more important than the music. According to the punk aesthetic, one can express oneself and produce moving and serious works with limited means and technical ability. It is not uncommon for anarcho-punk songs to lack the usual rock structure of verses and a chorus, however, there are exceptions to this. For example, later Chumbawamba songs were at the same time anarcho-punk and pop-oriented.

Bands such as Crass, Conflict, Nausea and Chumbawamba make use of both male and female vocalists.

Not all anarcho-aesthetics were reductive or simplistic though. George McKay had written of the idea of 'Crassonics', the sounds that the band Crass used or made in the recording studio to represent the nuclear sublime. These 'incorporated sounds of destruction, alienation, and accusation, in a righteous and relentless assault on the new nuclear norm.... [L]istenability and expressibility seemed polar opposites: to express nuclear horror in music ... one had to interrogate the limits of what one would be willing to listen to.'

== See also ==
- Anarchism and the arts
- Anarchist symbolism
- Animal rights and punk subculture
- Class War
- Crust punk
- Red and Anarchist Skinheads
- Punk ideologies
- List of anarcho-punk bands
- List of anarchist musicians
- List of subcultures
- Up Against the Wall Motherfucker

== Bibliography ==
- Geoff Eley - "Do It Yourself Politics (DIY)", Forging Democracy: The History of the Left in Europe, 1850-2000, chapter 27: "The Center and the Margins: Decline or Renewal?." Oxford University Press, 2002. ISBN 0-19-504479-7 p. 476-481.
- Ian Glasper - The Day the Country Died: A History of Anarcho Punk 1980 to 1984 (Cherry Red publishing, 2006 ISBN 978-1-901447-70-5)
- Craig O'Hara - Philosophy of Punk: More Than Noise (AK Press, 1999 ISBN 978-1-873176-16-0)
- George Berger - The Story of Crass (London: Omnibus Press 2006, ISBN 1-84609-402-X)
