= Crass Records discography =

This is an overview of the Crass Records discography. (NB, dates refer to initial UK releases, many of these records have since been re-issued in CD format)

== Crass releases ==
(NB, for complete Crass discography see main Crass page)

- "Reality Asylum" (7", 1978)
- Stations of the Crass (LP, 1979)
- "Bloody Revolutions" (single, joint released with the Poison Girls, 1980)
- The Feeding of the 5000 (Second Sitting) (12" EP, 1981, re-issue of first Small Wonder Records release, with missing track "Asylum" restored)
- "Nagasaki Nightmare" (single, 1981))
- Penis Envy (LP, 1981)
- "Our Wedding" (flexi disc single recorded under the name Creative Recording And Sound Services given away with magazine Loving )
- "Merry Crassmas" (single, 1981, Crass' tongue-in-cheek stab at the Christmas novelty market )
- Christ The Album (double LP, 1982)
- "Sheep Farming in The Falklands" (single 1982, originally distributed anonymously as a flexi-disc)
- "How Does It Feel To Be The Mother of 1000 Dead?" (Single 1983)
- "Whodunnit?" (Single, 1983, pressed in "shit coloured vinyl", Crass' response to the re-election of Prime Minister Margaret Thatcher)
- Yes Sir, I Will (LP, 1983)
- "You're Already Dead" (single, 1984)
- Acts of Love (LP and book, 1985, described as "50 songs to My Other Self", this features the poems of Penny Rimbaud set to classical music and sung by Eve Libertine and Steve Ignorant. The book is illustrated by the paintings of Gee Vaucher)
- "Ten Notes On a Summer's Day" (12" EP, 1986)
- Best Before 1984 (retrospective LP compilation, 1986)

== Other artists ==
- Honey Bane- "You Can Be You" (1979, Bane backed by Crass using the name Donna and the Kebabs)
- Various artists- Bullshit Detector Volume 1 (1980)
- Poison Girls- Chappaquiddick Bridge LP (1980)
- Zounds- "War/Subvert/Can't Cheat Karma" (1980)
- Poison Girls- "Dirty Work/Promenade Immortale" (1980)
- Poison Girls- Hex (1980, reissue of record originally released on the X-N-Trix label in 1979)
- Flux Of Pink Indians- "Neu Smell" EP (1981)
- Annie Anxiety- "Barbed Wire Halo" (1981)
- The Snipers- "Three Peace Suite" EP (1981)
- Captain Sensible- "This Is Your Captain Speaking" EP (1981)
- DIRT- "Object, Refuse, Reject, Abuse" EP (1981)
- The Mob- "No Doves Fly Here" (1981)
- Conflict- "The House That Man Built" EP (1982)
- Rudimentary Peni- "Farce" EP (1982)
- The Cravats- "Rub Me Out" (1982)
- Various artists- Bullshit Detector Volume 2 (1982)
- Andy T- "Weary of the Flesh" EP (1982)
- The Alternative- "In Nomine Patri" EP (1982)
- DIRT- Never Mind DIRT, here's the Bollox (Live album, 1982)
- Anthrax- "Capitalism is Cannibalism" EP (1983)
- Omega Tribe- "Angry Songs" EP (1982)
- Sleeping Dogs- "Beware Sleeping Dogs" EP (1982)
- Hit Parade- "Bad News" EP (1982)
- D&V- "The Nearest Door" EP (1983)
- Lack of Knowledge- "Grey" EP (1983)
- MDC- "Multi-Death Corporations" EP (1983)
- Kukl - The Eye (1984)
- Various artists- Bullshit Detector Volume 3 (1984)
- Hit Parade- "Plastic Culture" (12" single, 1984)
- D&V- D&V (1984)
- Hit Parade- Knick Nack Paddy Whack (1985)
- Kukl - Holidays in Europe (1985)
- Jane Gregory- "Do Not Go/After a Dream" (1985)
- Various Artists- A Sides. Part One. 1979/1982 (CD collecting earlier releases as listed above, 1992)
- Various Artists- A Sides. Part Two. 1982/1985 (CD collecting earlier releases as listed above, 1992)
- Penny Rimbaud- Christ's Reality Asylum (Spoken word cassette only release, 1992)

== See also ==
- Crass Records
