= Penis Envy (album) =

Studio album by Crass
- Released: 1981
- Recorded: December 1980
- Studios: Southern Studios (Wood Green, London)
- Genre: Post-punk • anarcho-punk
- Length: 34:50
- Label: Crass Records
- Producer: Crass

Crass chronology
Stations of the Crass (1979)	Penis Envy (1981)	Christ – The Album (1982)

Alternative covers
- Cover of the remastered 'Crassical Collection' rerelease

Professional ratings
Review scores
Source	Rating
AllMusic	4.5/5 stars
The Encyclopedia of Popular Music	3/5 stars
Ox-Fanzine	5/5 stars
Select	3/5 medals

Penis Envy, released in 1981, was the third LP by the anarchist punk band Crass. The album was included at #36 on Rolling Stone's "40 Greatest Punk Albums of All Time" list in 2016.

The Crassical Collection version of this release, including new artwork by Gee Vaucher, remastered sound, liner notes by Eve Libertine and Penny Rimbaud and bonus material, was released in November 2010.

== Background and release ==
Named as a reference to some of Sigmund Freud's ideas concerning sexuality, this release marked something of a departure from the hardcore image that The Feeding of the 5000 and its follow up, Stations of the Crass, had to some extent given the group, for it featured more obviously complex musical arrangements, as well as exclusively female vocals by Eve Libertine and Joy De Vivre (although Steve Ignorant remained a group member and is credited on the record sleeve as "not on this recording"). The album addressed feminist issues and once again attacked the institutions of 'the system' such as marriage and sexual repression.

One track, not actually listed on the album cover, was a deliberately saccharine (described in fact by the band themselves as "pure, unadulterated shit") parody of a "middle of the road" love song entitled "Our Wedding". This was given away as a flexi disc with a teenage girl's romance magazine called Loving after having been offered it by an organisation calling itself Creative Recording And Sound Services (a backronym of Crass). A minor tabloid furore erupted once the hoax was revealed, with the News of the World going so far as to state that the album's title was "too obscene to print". (A leaflet giving the background to this Situationist-style prank was subsequently issued by the band). Now considered a rarity, the original flexi-disc fetches high prices on the collectors' market.

The album was banned by the retailer HMV. During the mid-1980s, Greater Manchester Police under the direction of James Anderton seized copies along with other records by Crass and the Dead Kennedys, from Eastern Bloc record shop. Frank Schofield was charged with displaying "obscene articles for publication for gain". The band Flux of Pink Indians, its two record labels and its publishing company were also charged under the Obscene Publications Act. The judge ruled against Crass in the ensuing court case, although this decision was overturned by the Court of Appeal, apart from the lyrics to one song, "Bata Motel". The heavy costs incurred by this episode were a contributing factor in Crass deciding to disband.

== Track listing ==
Side A
No.	Title	Length
1.	"Bata Motel"	3:34
2.	"Systematic Death"	3:57
3.	"Poison in a Pretty Pill"	3:40
4.	"What the Fuck?"	6:43

Side B
No.	Title	Length
5.	"Where Next Columbus?"	3:11
6.	"Berkertex Bribe"	3:21
7.	"Smother Love"	1:48
8.	"Health Surface"	3:31
9.	"Dry Weather"	3:06
10.	"Our Wedding" (unlisted track)	2:04

The Crassical Collection edition bonus tracks
No.	Title	Recorded	Length
11.	"Yorkie Talk" (compiled from archived material)	Southern Studios, January 2009	2:32
12.	"Yes, Folks" (sound collage)	Southern Studios, January 2009	3:21
13.	"The Unelected President" (remix/rewrite of "Major General Despair", previously released as "Peace Not War")	Southern Studios, Spring 2003	5:13

== Personnel ==
- Eve Libertine – vocals
- Joy De Vivre – vocals on "Health Surface"
- Phil Free – lead guitar
- B.A.Nana (N.A.Palmer) – rhythm guitar
- Pete Wright – bass guitar
- Penny Rimbaud – drums
- G – harmonium on "What the Fuck?"
- CRASS Member not on this recording – Steve Ignorant
- Engineered by John Loder
- Paintings by G
- Design by Crass at Exitstencil Press
