= There Is No Authority But Yourself =

There is No Authority But Yourself
- Directed by: Alexander Oey
- Produced by: Bruno Felix; Femke Wolting
- Starring: Crass (band)
- Cinematography: Alexander Oey
- Edited by: Alexander Oey
- Release date: 2006
- Running time: 70 minutes
- Country: Netherlands

There is No Authority But Yourself is a Dutch film directed by Alexander Oey documenting the history of anarchist punk band Crass. The film features archive footage of the band and interviews with former members Steve Ignorant, Penny Rimbaud and Gee Vaucher. As well as reflecting on the band's past the film focusses on their current activities, and includes footage of Rimbaud performing with Last Amendment at the Vortex jazz club in Hackney, a compost toilet building workshop and a permaculture course held at Dial House in the spring of 2006.

The title of the film is derived from the final lines of the Crass album Yes Sir, I Will; "You must learn to live with your own conscience, your own morality, your own decision, your own self. You alone can do it. There is no authority but yourself."

There is No Authority But Yourself premiered at the Raindance Film Festival at the Piccadilly Circus, London Trocadero in October 2006 and was part of the Official Selection film programme at the Flipside film festival in May 2008
