= David King (artist) =

English American Artist

David Anthony King (1948–2019) was an English American artist, (graphic) designer, and musician, a "significant figure in design history" best known as the designer of the symbol for the band Crass, "one of punk’s most recognizable and powerful designs".

== Life and career ==
King was born on 10 April 1948 in Ilford, Essex, and grew up in Gants Hill and Chigwell, Essex. At sixteen he enrolled at South East Essex Technical College in Dagenham to study Graphic Design, where in 1964 he met Penny Rimbaud and Gee Vaucher, who went on to form the band Crass.

After graduating from South East Essex Technical College in 1967, for the next ten years King worked for a succession of London advertising agencies, first as a graphic designer and later as an art director, including for the firms DDB Worldwide (Doyle Dane Bernbach) and Blackburn Daley.

In the 1970s King went to live at Dial House, Essex, the commune set up by Ratter and Vaucher on an isolated farm in the middle of an airfield in rural North Weald, Essex. There he designed the logo for their band Crass. Originally a logo for Rimbaud's pamphlet ‘Christ’s Reality Asylum and Les Pommes de Printemps’, the symbol was designed as a circular piece that seemed to include a Christian cross, a snake, the Union Jack, and a swastika. King has said the symbol was inspired by Japanese family crests and says it was created as “a reflection of Pen’s anger at what he felt were these destructive aspects of Christianity.” During this time he also performed with EXIT at the International Carnival of Experimental Sound in 1972.

In 1977 King moved to the SoHo neighborhood of New York, where he became part of the burgeoning Punk / No Wave scene, first as the drummer for The Gynecologists, leaving to form Arsenal (later known as Sleeping Dogs and Brain Rust) with Charlie Nash and Rhys Chatham in 1978. (When Chatham left to pursue solo efforts he was replaced by Howard A. Rodman.) King met his wife, Dione Hemberger, when she joined the band as the bassist that year. At the same time, King continued his graphic design practice, creating logos and posters for SoHo nightclubs such as Danceteria, Peppermint Lounge, Pop Front, and Pravda as well as flyers, logos, and album covers for bands such as Ut (band), Mrs. Machinery, Raining House, and Arsenal, as well as a series of Christmas cards for the Museum of Modern Art, New York.

In late 1980, King and the rest of Arsenal (now Charlie Nash and Dione King) moved to San Francisco and Arsenal changed their name to Sleeping Dogs, and then to Brain Rust in 1985 with King continuing to play drums and to design their flyers and album covers, usually credited as 'Dirty Dog'. In 1990 King enrolled at San Francisco Art Institute, where he studied drawing, painting, photography, printmaking, and poetry. He continued his graphic design work and expanded into photography, sculpture, and garden design.

His work has been included in many shows, including ‘Art into Landscape’ at the Serpentine Galleries, ‘The Art of Punk’ at the MOCA LA, and ‘Punk Graphics’ at Hayward Gallery. Several collections of his work have been published by Colpa Press, &Pens Press, and Gingko Press. In 2025, King's work was the subject of a solo exhibition at Printed Matter in New York.

King was interviewed extensively in the 'Art of Punk' video series produced by the Museum of Contemporary Art in Los Angeles (MOCA), for the episode 'Crass - The Art of Dave King and Gee Vaucher' (MOCAtv 2013).

David Anthony King died in San Francisco in 2019 at the age of 71 after a long battle with cancer.

== Publications ==
- Secret Origins of the Crass Symbol, &Pens Press, 2013
- Scrapbook, Colpa Press, Edition of 50, 2017
- Still, Colpa Press, 2018
- The Journey, Colpa Press, 2019
- David King Stencils: Past, Present, and Crass!, Gingko Press/Kill Your Idols, 2020
- Walking Photos, Colpa Press with foreword by Glen Helfand, 2020
- Happy, Colpa Press, 2020
