= Stations of the Crass =

Studio album by Crass
- Released: 1979
- Recorded: 7 and 11 August 1979
- Studios: Southern (London, UK); Pied Bull (Islington, London, UK)
- Genres: Anarcho-punk, hardcore punk, art punk
- Length: 79:23; 65:25 (Crassical release)
- Label: Crass
- Producer: Crass

Crass chronology
The Feeding of the 5000 (1978)	Stations of the Crass (1979)	Penis Envy (1981)

Alternative covers
- Cover of the remastered 'Crassical Collection' rerelease

Stations of the Crass is the second album by Crass, released in 1979. The record, originally released as a double 12", includes live tracks from a gig recorded at the Pied Bull pub in Islington, London, on 7 August 1979. The first three sides contain the studio tracks and play at 45 rpm, while the final side comprises the live material and plays at 33 rpm. The album's title is not only a pun on the Catholic rite of the Stations of the Cross (such jibes against the religious establishment were typical of Crass), but is also a reference to the graffiti campaign that the band had been conducting around London's underground railway system, the cover artwork depicting a wall at Bond Street tube station that had allegedly been 'decorated' by them. Although the album met mixed critical reception at first, it managed to sell at least 20,000 copies within two weeks.

A remastered edition of the album, complete with new artwork by Gee Vaucher designed specifically for the small size of a CD case, was due to be released in March 2009, but was delayed because of contentions with former members. The remastered 'Crassical Collection' version was eventually released in October 2010, including a 64-page booklet of liner notes by Steve Ignorant and Penny Rimbaud, as well as bonus tracks in the form of the band's 1979 John Peel Session. The live tracks recorded at the Pied Bull are not included on the remastered edition. In 2019, it was re-remastered by Penny Rimbaud at Abbey Road studios and re-released on both LP and CD, with the original cover art and tracklist, including the hidden track and the Pied Bull tracks. The Crassical Collection version was reissued in October 2020, including the Pied Bull concert.

== Critical reception ==
Professional ratings
Review scores
Source	Rating
AllMusic	4/5 stars
The Encyclopedia of Popular Music	3/5 stars
Ox-Fanzine	5/5 stars
Select	2/5 medals
Spin Alternative Record Guide	8/10

Graham Lock, when writing for New Musical Express, criticized the album in a 1979 review by questioning certain lyrics and the band's overall performance. The Gay Community News deemed the album "harsh, uncompromising, and between the eyes punk."

More recent reception towards the album has been mostly warm. Ned Raggett of AllMusic stated that "Crass creates a unique brand of fierce, inspirational music." Trouser Press, on the other hand, stated that the album's tracks "blur into white noise." Chuck Eddy, in Spin's "Crust Never Sleeps: 8 Anarcho Punk Essentials," wrote that Crass "vary their often incomprehensibly accented extremist rants with just enough dub, art disco, poetry, and scatology to keep things interesting."

== Track listing ==
Side one
No.	Title	Length
1.	"Mother-Earth"	4:11
2.	"White Punks on Hope"	2:22
3.	"You've Got Big Hands"	1:42
4.	"Darling"	1:56
5.	"System"	0:56
6.	"Big Man, Big M.A.N."	2:46
7.	"Hurry Up Garry (The Parsons Farted)"	1:11

Side two
No.	Title	Length
8.	"Fun Going On"	2:16
9.	"Crutch of Society"	1:52
10.	"Heard Too Much About"	1:08
11.	"Chairman of the Bored"	1:18
12.	"Tired"	3:19
13.	"Walls (Fun in the Oven)"	2:59
14.	"Upright Citizen"	3:15

Side three
No.	Title	Length
15.	"The Gasman Cometh"	3:17
16.	"Demoncrats"	3:20
17.	"Contaminational Power"	2:01
18.	"Time Out"	2:16
19.	"I Ain't Thick, It's Just a Trick"	4:24
20.	"Prime Sinister" (unlisted track)	1:20

Side four (Live at Pied Bull, Islington, August 7, 1979)
No.	Title	Length
21.	"System"
22.	"Big Man, Big M.A.N."
23.	"Banned from the Roxy"
24.	"Hurry Up Garry"
25.	"Time Out"
26.	"They've Got a Bomb"
27.	"Fight War, Not Wars"
28.	"Women"
29.	"Shaved Women"
30.	"You Pay"
31.	"Heard Too Much About"
32.	"Angels"
33.	"What a Shame"
34.	"So What"
35.	"G's Song"
36.	"Do They Owe Us a Living?"
37.	"Punk Is Dead"

Original CD edition
No.	Title	Length
1.	"Mother-Earth"	4:11
2.	"White Punks on Hope"	2:22
3.	"You've Got Big Hands"	1:42
4.	"Darling"	1:56
5.	"System"	0:56
6.	"Big Man, Big M.A.N."	2:46
7.	"Hurry Up Garry (The Parsons Farted)"	1:11
8.	"Fun Going One"	2:16
9.	"Crutch of Society"	1:52
10.	"Heard Too Much About"	1:08
11.	"Chairman of the Bored"	1:18
12.	"Tired"	3:19
13.	"Walls"	2:59
14.	"Upright Citizen"	3:15
15.	"The Gasman Cometh"	3:17
16.	"Demo(n)crats"	3:20
17.	"Contaminational Power"	2:01
18.	"Time Out"	2:16
19.	"I Ain't Thick, It's Just a Trick"	4:24
20.	"Prime Sinister" (listed as "Outro Poem")	1:20
21.	"System / Big Man Big M.A.N / Banned from the Roxy / Hurry Up Garry / Time Out / They've Got a Bomb / Fight War Not Wars" (live)	12:51
22.	"Women / Shaved Women / You Pay / Heard Too Much About" (live)	7:10
23.	"Angels / What a Shame / So What / G's Song" (live)	7:19
24.	"Do They Owe Us a Living?" (live)	2:04
25.	"Punk Is Dead" (live)	1:56

The Crassical Collection edition (2010 version)
No.	Title	Origin	Length
1.	"Mother-Earth"		4:11
2.	"White Punks on Hope"		2:22
3.	"You've Got Big Hands"		1:42
4.	"Darling"		1:56
5.	"System"		0:56
6.	"Big Man, Big M.A.N."		2:46
7.	"Hurry Up Garry (The Parsons Farted)"		1:11
8.	"Fun Going One"		2:16
9.	"Crutch of Society"		1:52
10.	"Heard Too Much About"		1:08
11.	"Chairman of the Bored"		1:18
12.	"Tired"		3:19
13.	"Walls"		2:59
14.	"Upright Citizen"		3:15
15.	"The Gasman Cometh"		3:17
16.	"Demo(n)crats"		3:20
17.	"Contaminational Power"		2:01
18.	"Time Out"		2:16
19.	"I Ain't Thick, It's Just a Trick"		4:24
20.	"Radio Radicals" (thread track)		2:21
21.	"Shaved Women" (live)	BBC Maida Vale Peel Session, March 28, 1979	3:06
22.	"They've Got a Bomb"	BBC Maida Vale Peel Session, March 28, 1979	4:25
23.	"Tired"	BBC Maida Vale Peel Session, March 28, 1979	2:39
24.	"G's Song"	BBC Maida Vale Peel Session, March 28, 1979	1:11
25.	"Mother-Earth"	BBC Maida Vale Peel Session, March 28, 1979	4:00
26.	"Gozonabit" (run out track)		1:00

The Crassical Collection edition (2020 version) CD1
No.	Title	Length
1.	"Mother-Earth"	4:11
2.	"White Punks on Hope"	2:22
3.	"You've Got Big Hands"	1:42
4.	"Darling"	1:56
5.	"System"	0:56
6.	"Big Man, Big M.A.N."	2:46
7.	"Hurry Up Garry (The Parsons Farted)"	1:11
8.	"Fun Going One"	2:16
9.	"Crutch of Society"	1:52
10.	"Heard Too Much About"	1:08
11.	"Chairman of the Bored"	1:18
12.	"Tired"	3:19
13.	"Walls"	2:59
14.	"Upright Citizen"	3:15
15.	"The Gasman Cometh"	3:17
16.	"Demo(n)crats"	3:20
17.	"Contaminational Power"	2:01
18.	"Time Out"	2:16
19.	"I Ain't Thick, It's Just a Trick"	4:24

CD2
No.	Title	{{{extra_column}}}	Length
20.	"Radio Radicals" (thread track)		2:21
21.	"Shaved Women" (live)	BBC Maida Vale Peel Session, March 28, 1979	3:06
22.	"They've Got a Bomb"	BBC Maida Vale Peel Session, March 28, 1979	4:25
23.	"Tired"	BBC Maida Vale Peel Session, March 28, 1979	2:39
24.	"G's Song"	BBC Maida Vale Peel Session, March 28, 1979	1:11
25.	"Mother-Earth"	BBC Maida Vale Peel Session, March 28, 1979	4:00
26.	"Gozonabit" (run out track)		1:00
27.	"System"
28.	"Big Man, Big M.A.N."
29.	"Banned from the Roxy"
30.	"Hurry Up Garry"
31.	"Time Out"
32.	"They've Got a Bomb"
33.	"Fight War, Not Wars"
34.	"Women"
35.	"Shaved Women"
36.	"You Pay"
37.	"Heard Too Much About"
38.	"Angels"
39.	"What a Shame"
40.	"So What"
41.	"G's Song"
42.	"Do They Owe Us a Living?"
43.	"Punk Is Dead"
44.	"Gozonabitmore" (run out track)

== Personnel ==
- Steve Ignorant – lead vocals
- Eve Libertine – lead vocals on tracks 4, 13, 16
- Joy De Vivre – voices
- Phil Free – lead guitar, backing vocals
- N.A. Palmer – rhythm guitar, backing vocals
- Pete Wright – bass guitar, lead vocals on tracks 8, 12, 14
- Penny Rimbaud – drums, radio
- Gee Vaucher – artwork
- Mick Duffield – films
