= Christ – The Album =

Christ - The Album

Studio album by Crass
- Released: 1982
- Recorded: July 1981 – February 1982
- Studio: Southern Studios (Wood Green, London)
- Genre: Anarcho punk, art punk, hardcore punk
- Length: 95:07; 47:44 (original studio disc); 47:23 (live disc)
- Label: Crass
- Producer: Crass

Crass chronology
Penis Envy (1981)	Christ - The Album (1982)	Yes Sir, I Will (1983)

Alternative covers
- Cover of the remastered Crassical Collection re-release

Christ – The Album is the fourth album by punk band Crass, released in 1982. It was released as a boxed-set, double-vinyl LP package, including one disc of new studio material and another, entitled Well Forked.. But Not Dead, a live recording of the band's June 1981 gig at the 100 Club in London along with other studio tracks, demos and tape fragments. The box also included a book, A Series of Shock Slogans and Mindless Token Tantrums (featuring Penny Rimbaud's essay "The Last of the Hippies", telling the story of the suspicious death of his friend Wally Hope), and a large poster painted by Gee Vaucher. The album was well received and the band considered it their best.

In 2011, a two-disc remastered CD edition of the album was released as a part of the band's Crassical Collection reissue series. This edition featured extra content, with the studio album (and the bonus tracks) featured on the first disc and the live album featured on the second disc. On 2 October 2020, the Crassical Collection edition was reissued, with the bonus tracks added to the second disc.

== Background and release ==
Unlike previous Crass albums, Christ took almost a year to record, produce and mix, during which time the Falklands War had taken place. This caused Crass to fundamentally question their approach to making records. As a group whose very reason for existing was to comment on political issues, they felt that they had been overtaken and made to appear redundant by real-world events.

For subsequent releases, including the singles "How Does It Feel to Be the Mother of a Thousand Dead", "Sheep Farming in the Falklands" and the album Yes Sir, I Will, the band stripped their sound "back to basics", issuing the singles as "tactical responses" to political situations.

Rereleases of the album bear the line "With love to Steve Herman who died on the 4th of February 1989" on the back cover. Herman was Crass' guitar player during their first few months.

== Reception ==
Professional ratings
Review scores
Source	Rating
AllMusic	4/5 stars
The Encyclopedia of Popular Music	2/5 stars
Ox-Fanzine	5/5 stars
Select	2/5 medals

Christ – The Album is considered by former members of Crass to be among their best recordings. In a retrospective article written for the album, Harry Sword of The Quietus refers to it as "the most caustic realization of their vision" and called it "a seething howl that remains most intensely relevant to politics and vibrantly forward thinking in terms of music." Trouser Press referred to it as "quintessential" for it "proves the band's courage and conviction."

Reviewing the album in NME, Paul Du Noyer wrote: "There's always something exciting about such raw passion; anger which hits you so hard that every idea in your head gets shook up, violently."

== Track listing ==
Side One
No.	Title	Length
1.	"Have a Nice Day"	2:44
2.	"Mother Love"	2:52
3.	"Nineteen Eighty Bore"	4:09
4.	"I Know There Is Love"	2:47
5.	"Beg Your Pardon"	3:07
6.	"Birth Control 'n' Rock 'n' Roll"	2:59
7.	"Reality Whitewash"	3:07

Side Two
No.	Title	Length
8.	"It's the Greatest Working Class Rip-Off"	3:21
9.	"Deadhead"	2:16
10.	"You Can Be Who?"	3:01
11.	"Buy Now Pay As You Go"	2:22
12.	"Rival Tribal Revel Rebel, Part 2"	3:09
13.	"Bumhooler"	3:19
14.	"Sentiment (White Feathers)"	3:36
15.	"Major General Despair"	4:34

Well Forked... But Not Dead (Live at the 100 Club, London, 9 June 1981)
No.	Title	Length
16.	"Banned from the Roxy"	3:00
17.	"The Sound of One Hand" (titled "One Hand..." on Crassical Collection edition)	1:29
18.	"Punk Is Dead"	1:59
19.	"Nagasaki Nightmare"	4:31
20.	"Darling"	1:50
21.	"Bata Motel Blues" (titled "Kind of Who" on Crassical Collection edition)	0:26
22.	"Berkertex Bribe"	1:42
23.	"Fold It in Half"	0:58
24.	"Big Hands" (titled "Tony's Big Hands" on Crassical Collection edition)	2:15
25.	"Bumhooler"	2:22
26.	"Big A Little A"	4:27
27.	"First Woman"	1:01
28.	"Arlington 73"	1:25
29.	"Bomb Plus Tape"	4:13
30.	"Contaminational Power"	1:40
31.	"I Ain't Thick, It's Just a Trick"	1:50
32.	"G's Song"	0:22
33.	"Securicor"	1:49
34.	"I Can't Stand It"	1:48
35.	"Shaved Women"	2:43
36.	"A Part of Life" (titled "Not Apart" on Crassical Collection edition)	0:28
37.	"Do They Owe Us a Living?"	1:22
38.	"So What?"	1:20
39.	"Salt 'n' Pepper"	2:15

Crassical Collection bonus tracks
No.	Title	Length
16.	"Have a Nice Day" (alternative version)	3:37
17.	"Mother Love" (alternative version)	2:11
18.	"Buy Now Pay As You Go" (alternative version)	2:37
19.	"Birth Control 'n' Rock 'n' Roll" (alternative version)	1:57
20.	"You Can Be Who?" (alternative version)	2:49
21.	"Reality Whitewash" (alternative version)	2:42
22.	"The Greatest Working Class Rip-Off" (alternative version)	5:04

== Personnel ==
- Joy De Vivre - vocals
- Steve Ignorant - vocals
- Peeve Libido (Eve Libertine) - vocals
- Phil Free - synthesizer, guitar
- $ri Hari Nana B.A. (N.A.Palmer) - rhythm sitar
- Sybil Right (Pete Wright) - bass guitar
- Paul Ellis - strings
- Elvis Rimbaud (Penny Rimbaud) - drums, radio
- Steve Herman - guitar (on the two demos on 'Well Forked')
- Jean Paul Marat - liner notes
