= Ten Notes on a Summer's Day =

Studio album by Crass
- Released: 1986
- Recorded: Winter 1984 – Summer 1985
- Studio: Southern Studios, Wood Green, London
- Genre: Avant-garde
- Length: 20:03; 32:31 (Crassical Collection)
- Label: Crass Records
- Producer: Penny Rimbaud

Crass chronology
Yes Sir, I Will (1983)	Ten Notes on a Summer's Day (1986)	Best Before 1984 (1986)

Alternative covers
- Cover of the remastered 'Crassical Collection' rerelease

Professional ratings
Review scores
Source	Rating
AllMusic	4/5 stars
Classic Rock	7/10 stars
The Encyclopedia of Popular Music	3/5 stars

Ten Notes on a Summer's Day is the sixth and final studio album by the English punk rock group Crass, though members of the group subsequently collaborated and recorded under other names. It was released in 1986 and consists of a vocal and instrumental version of the same tracks in an avant-garde musical style.

The album was remastered and re-released as the sixth and final part of the Crassical Collection. The version of track 1 on the Crassical Collection CD has the opening notes from the instrumental version dubbed over the "What happened to Crass?" speech at the beginning of the vocal mix. The vocal mix also seamlessly fades into the Instrumental mix.

== Track list ==
No.	Title	Length
1.	"Ten Notes on a Summer's Day"	9:47
2.	"Ten Notes on a Summer's Day" (instrumental)	10:17

Crassical Collection bonus tracks
No.	Title	Length
3.	"37" (remix)	2:02
4.	"Pills and Ills"	5:20
5.	"Rocky Eyes"	1:52
6.	"Outro"	2:37
