= Last Amendment =

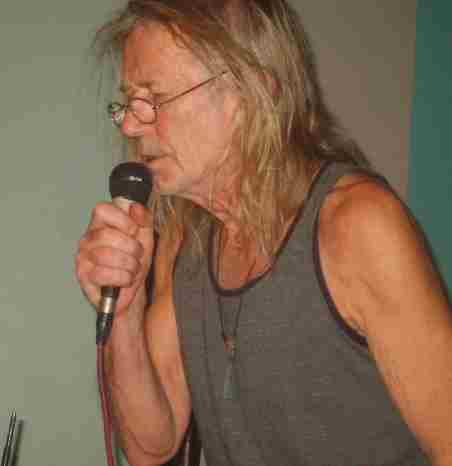
Penny Rimbaud performing with Last Amendment at The Vortex, Hackney, November 2006

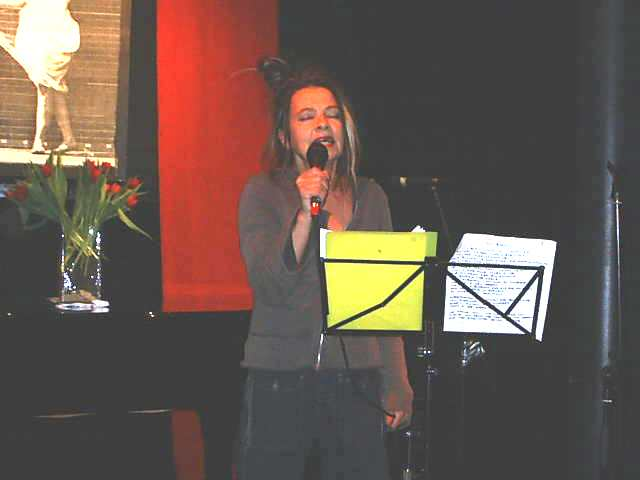
Eve Libertine performing as part of Last Amendment at the Hackney Vortex Club, January 2006

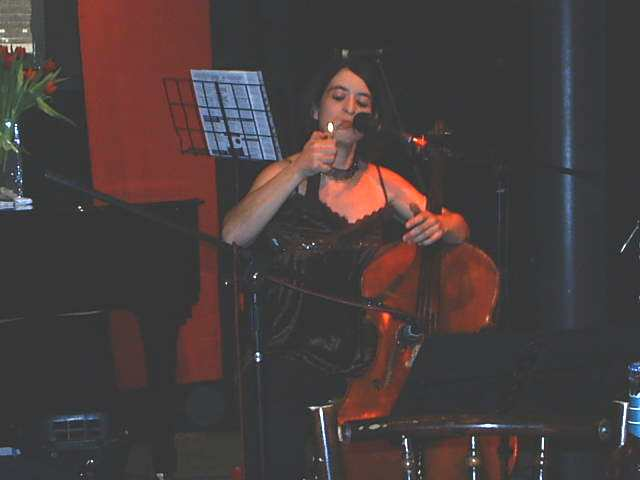
Kate Shortt performing at a Last Amendment event at the Vortex Club, January 2006

Last Amendment, formerly known as The Crass Collective and Crass Agenda, is the working title of a series of collaborations by ex-members of the anarcho-punk band Crass and others. Although Crass had formally split up in 1984, Penny Rimbaud, Gee Vaucher, Eve Libertine, Steve Ignorant, Andy Palmer and Pete Wright came together in November 2002 to put on a concert at the Queen Elizabeth Hall in opposition to the proposed War on Iraq. Although they did not all appear on the stage at the same time, most of the ex-members of Crass participated in the event under the name of The Crass Collective, along with other performers such as Ian MacKaye, Goldblade, the English Chamber Choir, Fun Da Mental, and Nabil Shaban, among others.

The Crass Collective continued to put on gigs and performances, usually of a collaborative nature, on a regular basis throughout 2003 at the Vortex Club in Stoke Newington, London. In October of that year however they changed the name of the project to Crass Agenda. Works by the collective have included Dada cabaret, an interpretation of Allen Ginsberg's poem Howl, Crass' Yes Sir I Will and an update of Dylan Thomas' play Under Milk Wood, in which property developers move into the mythical Welsh village of Llareggub.

Others that have worked as part of Crass Collective/Crass Agenda include disability rights advocate and actor Nabil Shaban, violinist and pianist Dylan Bates, saxophone player Ingrid Laubrock, John Sharian, Julian Siegel, Gene Calderazzo, Kate Shortt, guitarist and bass player Jennifer Maidman, Ed Jones, A-Soma and others. During 2004 Crass Agenda were at the forefront of a campaign against the closure of the Vortex jazz club, which has now relocated to Hackney.

In June 2005 the project was renamed Last Amendment, with their website, declaring the name Crass Agenda as being "no more". Their first live performance using this incarnation was on 30 June at the New Vortex club in Hackney, east London.

== Discography ==
- Savage Utopia – featuring Eve Libertine, Christine Tobin, A-Soma, Louise Elliot, Kevin Davy, Phil Robson, Liam Noble, Davide Mantovani, Matt Black (of Coldcut) performing work by Penny Rimbaud (Babel Label/Exitstencil, 2004)
- Penny Rimbaud's How? – poetry based around Allen Ginsberg's Howl, recorded live at the Vortex Club. (Babel Label/Exitstencil, 2004)
- In the Beginning Was the WORD – Live DVD recorded at the Progress Bar, Tufnell Park, London, 18 November 2004 (Gallery gallery Productions @ Le Chaos Factory, 2006)
