= Stratford Mercenaries =

English punk rock band

- Origin: Stratford, London, England, UK
- Genre: Punk rock
- Years active: 1995–1999
- Label: Southern Records
- Past members: Ed "Eddafed" Addley; Steve Ignorant; Phil Barker; Gary "Gazzer"

Stratford Mercenaries were an English punk rock band that was formed in late 1995 by Gary "Gazzer" from the punk band Dirt and Ed "Eddafed" Addley from the punk band Suicidal Supermarket Trolleys. The band was joined by Steve Ignorant from the punk rock band Crass and Phil Barker from the punk rock band Buzzcocks in early 1996.

The band released a four-track EP in August 1996, followed by their first album in 1997 titled No Sighing Strains of Violins. Tours of the US, Europe and Japan followed in 1997. A follow-up album was released in 1998 titled A Sense of Solitude. The album received a two-star rating from AllMusic, whose reviewer Adam Bregman described it as "another careless disappointment from the Stratford Mercenaries, who seem to be incapable of good taste when it comes to recording."
