= Yes Sir, I Will =

Studio album by Crass
- Released: 1983
- Recorded: March 1983
- Studio: Southern Studios (Wood Green, London)
- Genre: Anarcho-punk; avant-punk; noise
- Length: 43:53
- Label: Crass
- Producer: Crass

Crass chronology
Christ The Album (1982)	Yes Sir, I Will (1983)	Ten Notes on a Summer's Day (1985)

Alternative covers
- Cover of the remastered 'Crassical Collection' rerelease

Professional ratings
Review scores
Source	Rating
AllMusic	3/5 stars
Punknews.org	3.5/5 stars
Select	1/5 medals
The Sleeping Shaman	(mixed)

Yes Sir, I Will is the fifth album by anarcho-punk band Crass. Released in March 1983, the album is a virulent attack on then-Prime Minister of the United Kingdom Margaret Thatcher and her government in the aftermath of the Falklands War and was set nearly wholly over a raging and an almost free-form improvised backing provided by the group's musicians.

== Content ==
Many of the lyrics from this album are extracted from Penny Rimbaud's extended poem Rocky Eyed. The original vinyl release presented the contents as one long piece split over both sides with no banding between songs, making it the longest punk rock song ever recorded.

Rimbaud summarised the album in an interview with Radio Free France:

The boundaries increasingly ceased to have any relevance – prior to the Falklands War, one naively believed that there were separations between 'this' and 'that' and that if you dealt with 'this' then you could do 'that'... like songs – each song had its own little separate thing to deal with and Yes Sir, I Will is a statement about the fact that there isn't any separation – that it's all one and the same thing, that there is no single cause or single idea – there's no-one else to blame but yourself. That you can't say, "Well let's now concentrate on the Northern Ireland problem", "let's now concentrate on the problem of sexual relationships"... you can't do that – everything now is one major problem and that problem stems from yourself.

Sleeve notes for the album include parts of Rimbaud's article The Pig's Head Controversy that originally appeared in the Crass-produced magazine International Anthem.

The title, taken from a news report of a conversation between Charles, Prince of Wales and Falklands War veteran Simon Weston, is an ironic criticism. Charles, visiting the extensively, permanently burned Weston in the hospital, dryly told him to "Get well soon" and Weston's sincere reply is the album's cynical title. Rimbaud, commenting on this, has said, "That was the hook. That was such an audacious thing to do at the time. Especially given that one had to feel compassion for Simon Weston."

The album has an extreme disparity between the aggression of the music and the peacefulness of the message. In an interview about the nature of the anger that often crossed between passion and aggression on the album, Gee Vaucher said:

If you're going to rant and rave or be angry about anything, one does it because you have a vision of the opposite. We've worked the way we have done for the last seven years because it seemed that people weren't informed about what was happening in the world on a simple basis, especially a lot of young people. The feeling I got from a lot of young people was that there was something drastically wrong with the world – technically they didn't know how that was operating and obviously we've offered them information which hopefully gave them the possibility of deciding for themselves, and a broader outlook on their own lives.

== Rereleases ==
A film made by Crass member Gee Vaucher to accompany Yes Sir, I Will was shown at the UK National Film Theatre's Stuff the Jubilee festival of punk films in 2002, and the track was remixed in 2002 by Rimbaud to incorporate additional jazz instrumentation provided by Ingrid Laubrock (saxophone) and Julian Siegel (double bass) to augment the original performance.

The Crassical Collection version of this release, including new artwork by Vaucher, remastered sound and liner notes by Steve Ignorant and Rimbaud, was released on May 17, 2011. The reissue also contains a second disc (entitled Why Don't You Fuck Off?), which has Rimbaud's 2002 remix of the album, featuring Laubrock and Seigal. No track titles appeared on the original versions of the album; however, the Crassical Collection edition gave the tracks titles. The first disc of the Crassical Collection edition is indexed incorrectly, with some tracks being shown longer or shorter than they were on the original release on the CD player's display, however the second disc is indexed correctly.

== Track listing ==
No.	Title	Length
1.	"Step Outside" and "Rocky Eyes"	5:30
2.	"Anarchy's Just Another Word"	2:36
3.	"Speed or Greed"	1:00
4.	"The Five Knuckle Shuffle"	2:08
5.	"A Rock 'n' Roll Swindler"	6:47
6.	"Burying the Hatchet"	5:41
7.	"Taking Sides"	20:08

Crassical Collection edition, disc one
No.	Title	Length
1.	"Step Outside"	0:43
2.	"Rocky Eyes"	4:42
3.	"Anarchy's Just Another Word"	2:36
4.	"Speed or Greed?"	1:01
5.	"The Five Knuckle Shuffle"	2:09
6.	"A Rock 'n' Roll Swindler" and "Burying the Hatchet"	12:28
7.	"Taking Sides"	20:07

Crassical Collection edition, disc two (Why Don't You Fuck Off?)
No.	Title	Length
1.	"Bird of a Nation"	1:49
2.	"Step Outside"	0:40
3.	"Rocky Eyes"	4:26
4.	"Anarchy's Just Another Word"	2:38
5.	"Mouthing the Words"	1:01
6.	"The Five Knuckle Shuffle"	2:09
7.	"A Rock 'n' Roll Swindler"	12:47
8.	"Taking Sides"	20:16

== Personnel ==
- Steve Ignorant - vocals
- Joy De Vivre - vocals
- Phil Free - guitar
- Gee Vaucher - voices, artwork
- Eve Libertine - vocals
- N. A. Palmer - rhythm guitar, vocals, voices
- Penny Rimbaud - drums, vocals
- Pete Wright - bass guitar
- Paul Ellis - piano, strings
- Crass - producer
- John Loder - engineer
- Judy - typing

== Quotes ==
- "Be warned! The nature of your oppression is the aesthetic of our anger" - Crass, Yes Sir, I Will album cover (1983)
- "You must learn to live with your own conscience, your own morality, your own decision, your own self. You alone can do it. There is no authority but yourself." - Crass, Yes Sir, I Will (1983)
- "The listener experiences and shares the performer's exhaustion as voices crack, the beat wanders, energy flags and returns" - George McKay describing the album in Senseless Acts of Beauty (Verso, 1996)
