= Southern Records =

Record label

- Founded: 1992
- Founder: John Loder; Allison Schnackenberg; Danielle Soto
- Distributors: Southern Studios; Forte Music
- Genre: Various
- Country of origin: UK; US
- Location: London, England; Chicago, Illinois
- Official website: www.southern.net

Founded 1992 by John Loder, Southern Records is an independent record label (Loder also ran the recording facility Southern Studios). It is based in London and until 2008 had offices in the United States, France and Berlin.

The label is closely associated with Crass Records, Corpus Christi Records and Dischord Records.

== History ==
=== Background ===
Southern Studios was a recording label owned and operated by John Loder from the 1970s until his death. Loder became friends with musician Penny Rimbaud and collaborated with him in an experimental band called EXIT. Rimbaud later formed anarchist punk band Crass, and Loder and his Southern Studios were chosen to record their first album, The Feeding of the 5000. That record was originally released on Small Wonder Records. When Small Wonder encountered problems manufacturing the release, due to the allegedly blasphemous nature of the lyrics, Crass decided they needed their own label to take full control of their output. Loder facilitated this by acting as the business manager behind Crass Records. He arranged manufacture, distribution and accounting.

After the Crass record's success in 1978, Loder became the go-to alternative distributor for a generation of independent musicians. This connected Loder with the emerging international independent record business. He formed alliances with small distributors around the world to distribute Crass's output, and in the process U.S. labels like Touch and Go found outlets for their releases overseas. Circa 1984, he formed a lasting partnership with Dischord Records. In 1986, Ian MacKaye traveled to London looking to forge a deal with Loder that would satisfy the demand for Minor Threat records in the UK. The deal struck resulted in Dischord records being manufactured in a factory on the European mainland that Southern had contracted with, and for decades Minor Threat records were stamped "Made in France." Southern served as their pressing agent and distributor through 2008.

=== 2000s ===
Label founder Loder died in 2005. The same year, Allison Schnackenberg, label boss, set up the Latitudes imprint to record and release one sessions, in a similar spirit to the BBC's Peel Sessions.

Starting in late 2008, Southern closed its international office and moved all operations to London. Chicago closed November 2008, Le Havre closed July 2009, and Berlin closed December 2012.

On 14 December 2023, Nomeansno posted on their Facebook page that the label has been selling their records without payment to the band for years and are not an authorized source of their recordings.

== Imprints ==
Other label imprints operated by Southern include Black Diamond, Latitudes, Midwich Records, and Truth Cult.

== Roster ==
- 90 Day Men
- 67
- Antisect
- Action Beat
- The Action Time
- Akimbo
- Alias
- Altamont
- A Minor Forest
- André de Villiers
- Antisect
- António Cabrita Quintet
- Arbouretum
- Armagideon
- A-Set
- A Storm of Light
- Asva
- Atombombpocketknife
- A Whisper In The Noise
- Babes in Toyland
- Baby Dayliner
- Bardo Pond
- Beekeeper
- Bellafea
- Bell Gardens
- Big Black
- Billy Mahonie
- The Black Heart Procession
- The Black Swans
- Blonde Redhead
- Blood of the Red Owl
- The Bloodthirsty Lovers
- Blood Time
- Bob Tilton
- Boduf Songs
- Braid
- Bulbul
- Buried at Sea
- Burning Airlines
- Carter The Unstoppable Sex Machine
- Cat On Form
- Cave
- Check Engine
- Chrome Hoof
- Chumbawamba
- Crass
- Crucifix
- Current 93
- Curse of the Golden Vampire
- Darediablo
- The Delta 72
- The Desert Sessions
- Dianogah
- Die Kreuzen
- Digital
- The Dismemberment Plan
- Dälek
- Domes of Silence
- Dÿse
- Dub Specialists
- Dub Trio
- Eagles of Death Metal
- Earth
- Enablers
- End of Level Boss
- Enon
- The Entrance Band
- Erik Friedlander
- Esmerine
- The Exit
- Ex Models
- Fantômas
- Farmers Market
- Faucet
- Fernando Goin
- Flu.ID
- Franklin
- Frightwig
- Future Islands
- Gang Gang Dance
- Geoff Farina
- The Ghost
- Girls Against Boys
- Glorytellers
- GoGoGo Airheart
- Goon Moon
- Grails
- The Graveyard Boogie Man
- Grifters
- Guapo
- The Guaranteed Ugly
- Gunshot
- The Hades Kick
- The Hanson Brothers
- Hawnay Troof
- The Haxan Cloak
- Hella
- The Hidden Hand
- Him
- Instigators
- Isis
- Jah Wobble
- Jenny Hoyston
- Jeremy Boyle
- The Jesus Lizard
- Joan of Arc
- Kaada
- Karate
- Keith LeBlanc
- Kid606
- Krispy 3
- L'Acephale
- Lack of Knowledge
- The Lapse
- Lay Quiet Awhile
- Les Savy Fav
- Little Annie
- Lucky Stars
- Lungleg
- Lustre King
- Made out of Babies
- Magik Markers
- The Make-Up
- The Mars Volta
- Master Musicians of Bukkake
- Melvins
- Michael Cashmore
- Mitch Mitchell's Terrifying Experience
- Moistboyz
- Mondo Generator
- Mothlite
- Mouse on Mars
- Nadja
- Nancy Wallace
- The National
- Neurosis
- The New Year
- Nina Nastasia
- Nomeansno
- Northern State
- Nurse With Wound
- Odd Nosdam
- Orthrelm
- Ostinato
- The Owl Service
- The Paper Chase
- Paul Newman
- Peeping Tom
- Penny Rimbaud
- Phantomsmasher
- Pinback
- Pink Anvil
- Place of Skulls
- Prong
- Pseudo Nippon
- P.W. Long
- Qui
- Quint
- Racebannon
- Radical Dance Faction
- Rats on Rafts
- Raw Power
- Restless
- Retsin
- Rex
- Rudimentary Peni
- Sage Francis
- Savage Republic
- Sea Tiger
- Sensational
- Shepard
- Shipping News
- Silverfish
- Silvester Anfang
- Slow Loris
- The Smoothies
- Sole
- The Sorts
- Steroid Maximus
- Stinking Lizaveta
- Stratford Mercenaries
- Subhumans
- Sweep the Leg Johnny
- Sylvester Anfang II
- Tango Ratty
- Tartufi
- Ten Grand
- That's It
- Themselves
- Therapy?
- Tight Phantomz
- Todd
- Tomahawk
- Trencher
- Trevor Dunn's Trio-Convulsant
- Ui
- Unsane
- U.S. Christmas
- Volt
- Voodooshock
- Warhorse
- We Insist!
- White Magic
- William Elliott Whitmore
- The Winchester Club
- Wino & Conny Ochs
- Yoshimi and Yuka
- Young James Long
- Zu

== Southern imprints ==
=== Black Diamond ===
- Hella
- Goon Moon
- P.W. Long
- Oxbow
- Unsane

=== Latitudes ===
- Aidan Baker & Plurals
- A (Fallen) Black Deer
- Alexander Tucker & Decomposed Orchestra
- Ariel Pink's Haunted Graffiti
- A Storm Of Light
- Bardo Pond
- Blood & Time
- Boduf Songs
- Bohren und der Club of Gore
- Chelsea Wolfe
- Circle
- Daniel Higgs
- Dälek
- Drcarlsonalbion
- The Entrance Band
- Gang Gang Dance
- Ginnungagap
- Gowns
- Grails
- Grumbling Fur
- The Haxan Cloak
- Magik Markers
- The Master Musicians Of Bukkake
- Miasma & The Carousel Of Headless Horses
- Mount Eerie
- Nadja
- Paradise Island
- Shit and Shine
- Sir Richard Bishop
- Sylvester Anfang II
- White Magic
- William Elliott Whitmore

=== Midwich Records ===
- Ellen Mary McGee
- Jason Steel
- The Kittiwakes
- Moon Pool & Dead Band
- Nancy Wallace
- The Owl Service
- The Trysting Tree

=== Truth Cult ===
- Action Beat
- Eugene S. Robinson & Philippe Petit
- Japanther
- Pornbow

== See also ==
- List of independent UK record labels
- List of record labels
