= You'll Ruin It for Everyone =

Live album by Crass
- Released: 1993
- Recorded: 1981
- Genre: Anarcho Punk
- Length: 51:08
- Label: Pomona Records
- Producer: Crass

Crass chronology
Christ: The Bootleg (1989)	You'll Ruin It for Everyone (1993)

Professional ratings
Review scores
Source	Rating
AllMusic	3/5 stars

You'll Ruin It for Everyone is a live album by Crass recorded at the Lesser City Hall in Perth, Scotland, on July 4, 1981. It was released in 1993 on Pomona Records with the band's permission and re-released with different packaging in 2001. The album's title is taken from a comment made from the stage by Crass singer Steve Ignorant whilst trying to stop a group of skinheads in the audience from fighting.

The recording saw its initial release on CD by Pomona Records with a subsequent 1995 release on vinyl record and limited to 1000 copies by Axiome Productions.

== Track listing ==
1. "Punk Is Dead"
2. "Nagasaki Nightmare"
3. "Darling"
4. "Anti-Mother"
5. "Mother Love"
6. "Reality Whitewash"
7. "Heard Too Much About"
8. "System"
9. "Big Man, Big M.A.N."
10. "Health Surface"
11. "Big A Little A"
12. "You've Got Big Hands"
13. "Tired"
14. "Rival Tribal Rebel Revel"
15. "Poison in a Pretty Pill"
16. "Berkertex Bribe"
17. "They've Got a Bomb"
