= Girlfriend in a Kimono =

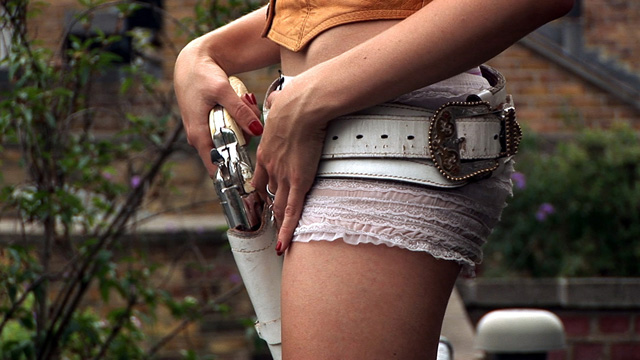
- Directed by: Dominic Thackray
- Written by: Dominic Thackray
- Produced by: Rachael Castell; Oli Harbottle; Ronni Raygun; Yumiko Tahata
- Starring: Penny Rimbaud; Shizuka Hata; Amber Butchart; Jesse Vile
- Cinematography: Candida Richardson; Captain Zip
- Edited by: Mia Bittar
- Music by: Ronni Raygun
- Distributed by: Dogwoof Pictures
- Release date: October 31, 2005
- Running time: 9 minutes
- Country: United Kingdom

Girlfriend in a Kimono is a short film shot in the summer of 2005, written and directed by Dominic Thackray who describes it as an anti-romance. Named after the 1987 song Girlfriend in a Coma by the Smiths, it tells the tale of autoslacker Vincent who falls for French burlesque dancer Candice, and who finds that consensus reality is unable to help him explain her lack of engagement. With most roles played by first-time actors it also features Penny Rimbaud (of Crass) as the enigmatic Rimbaud and Shizuka Hata (of Banzai) in two roles. The film's score is by Hey Is Dee Dee (Ramone) Home producer Ronni Raygun Thomas, and there is additional music from Saint Etienne, Crass and Talulah Gosh. It was produced by former Raindance producer Oli Harbottle and former East End Film Festival producer Rachael Castell.

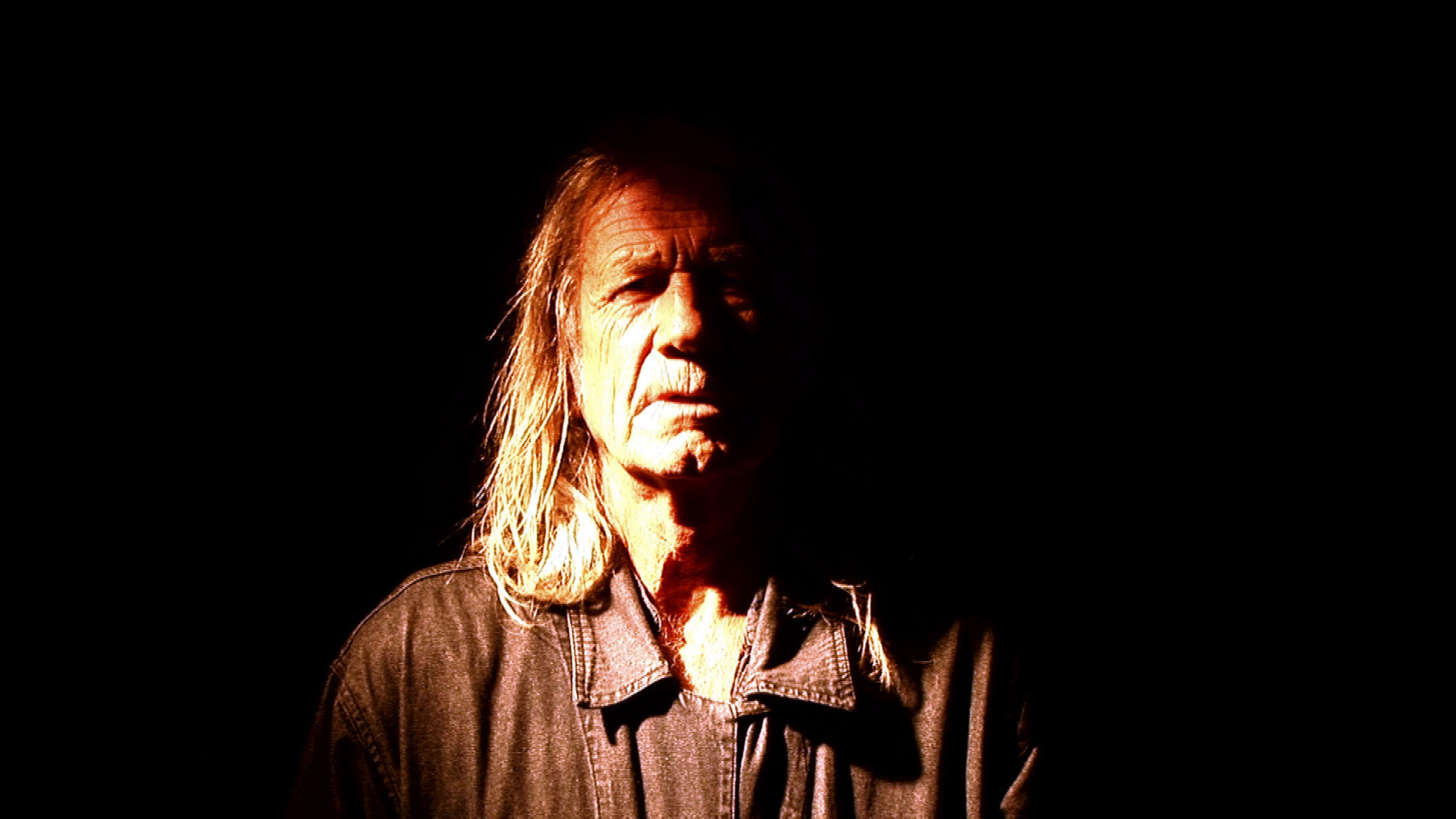
Penny Rimbaud in Girlfriend in a Kimono, (2005)

The film was selected by the British Council in early 2006 for inclusion in their film festivals programme and was shortlisted for awards at the Raindance Film Festival, the Halloween London Short Film Festival and Coney Island Film Festival. Writer-director Thackray worked a succession of low-rent jobs, the last of which as a receptionist in a zero-star hotel on the left bank in Paris in 1995, where he occasionally rented out rooms by the hour. Soon after quitting he embarked upon a degree in graphic design. Since 1999 he has worked for the Raindance Film Festival in London as designer and programmer. Girlfriend in a Kimono was his first film as director.

Some reviews of the film:

'A seductive sense of chaos, anarchy and romance. An original, spirited take on the madness and unpredictability of life in our capital city' Dave Calhoun, Time Out London

'Really funny' Wendy Mitchell, Indiewire

'Smart script and well-paced. This is the short Zach Braff might have made before embarking on Garden State' Adam Watkins, Six Degrees Film

'Penny Rimbaud crops up as a malevolent presence in the groovy mini-fable Girlfriend in a Kimono, a nicely shot and perfectly formed short' Chris Anderson, Plan B magazine
