= Alexander Oey =

Dutch film director

Alexander Oey (born 1960, Amsterdam) is a Dutch film director who has directed numerous documentaries for Dutch television, including the controversial Euro-Islam According to Tariq Ramadan (see Tariq Ramadan) and My Life as a Terrorist: The Story of Hans-Joachim Klein (see Hans-Joachim Klein), as well as There is No Authority But Yourself, a documentary on the punk-rock band Crass.
