= Trencher (band) =

- Origin: London, England, UK
- Genres: Casio core
- Years active: 2001–present
- Label: Southern Records
- Members: Lock-Monger; M. Shit; Pox

Trencher, formed in 2001, is a London-based, casio-grind band. They were one of the last bands to record a Peel Session in 2004. They are currently signed to Southern Records and have released music on many labels, including Johnson Family Records, Upset the Rhythm, Crucificados and Enjoyment Records.

== Members ==
- Pox: Bass, vocals
- Lock-Monger: drums
- M.Shit: Casio, Lounge Crooning

== Discography ==
- Presumed Dead cassette (2001)
- Black Queen/Trencher split 7-inch with Black Queen (2002)
- Kurt Schwitters/Trencher split 7-inch with Kurt Schwitters (2002)
- S.W.A Thrusts (2003)
- Trencher/The Kinetic Crash Cooperation split 5" with The Kinetic Crash Cooperation (2003)
- When Dracula Thinks "Look at me" CD (2003)
- Orthrelm/Trencher split 5" with Orthrelm (2005)
- Esquilax/Trencher (BBC Peel session) split 10-inch with Esquilax (2005, Upset The Rhythm)
- "Esquilax/Trencher" split cassette (2005) DLPR records
- Loa Loa/Trencher split CD with Loa Loa (2005)
- Cutting Pink With Knives/Trencher split 5" with Cutting Pink With Knives (2005)
- Trencher/Wether hexagonal lathe 8" split with Wether (2006)
- Phil Collins 3/Trencher split 7-inch with Phil Collins 3 (2006)
- Lips (2006, Southern Records)
- 99-05 Hi-Jinx Thus Far CS (2007)
- All Suffering...Soon To End 12-inch vinyl (2011) Enjoyment Records
- All Suffering...Soon To End CS (2011) Suplex Cassettes
- Azid cassette (2016)
