= Best Before 1984 =

Compilation album by Crass
- Released: 1986
- Recorded: 1979–1984
- Genre: Anarcho-punk
- Length: 79:03; 117:13 (Crassical Collection version)
- Label: Crass
- Producer: Crass

Crass chronology
Ten Notes on a Summer's Day (1985)	Best Before 1984 (1986)	Christ: The Bootleg (1989)

Professional ratings
Review scores
Source	Rating
AllMusic	link
Select	3/5 medals

Best Before 1984 is a compilation of Crass' singles and other tracks, released in 1986, including lyrics and a booklet ("...In Which Crass Voluntarily 'Blow Their Own'") which details the history of the band in their own words. The album was named in reference to the notion that 1984 was the band's "'sell by date", the year that they had often publicly stated that they would split up. Indeed, the band ceased gigging and recording in that year.

For many years, there were plans to release an expanded edition of Best Before 1984, which would include currently unavailable material (such as the "Merry Crassmas" and "Whodunnit?" singles) and rarities, in the same vein as the 'Crassical Collection' re-releases of the band's albums. These plans finally came to fruition in 2019, with the announcement of an expanded two-disc version of the album available for pre-order on the One Little Indian website. Between 1 and 5 April 2019, Crass made the first disc of this reissue available for free download from their social media pages. The reissued album was finally released on 2 October 2020 on the now-renamed One Little Independent Records, including CD-sized replicas of the original poster covers from the singles.

== Track listing ==
=== Original 1986 release ===
1. "Do They Owe Us a Living?"
2. "Major General Despair"
3. "Angela Rippon"
4. "Reality Asylum"
5. "Shaved Women"
6. "Bloody Revolutions"
7. "Nagasaki Nightmare"
8. "Big A Little A"
9. "Rival Tribal Rebel Revel"
10. "Sheep Farming in The Falklands" (Flexi)
11. "How Does It Feel?"
12. "The Immortal Death"
13. "Don't Tell Me You Care"
14. "Sheep Farming in The Falklands"
15. "Gotcha"
16. "You're Already Dead"
17. "Nagasaki is Yesterday's Dog-End"
18. "Don't Get Caught"
19. "Smash The Mac"
20. "Do They Owe Us a Living?" (Live in Aberdare from the last gig)

=== 2019 remaster ===
==== CD 1 ====
1. Thread 1
2. "Reality Asylum"
3. "Shaved Women"
4. Thread 2
5. "Bloody Revolutions"
6. Thread 3
7. "Nagasaki Nightmare"
8. "Big A Little A"
9. Thread 4
10. "Rival Tribal Rebel Revel"
11. Thread 5
12. "Sheep Farming in The Falklands" (Flexi)
13. Thread 6
14. "Rocky Eyed"
15. "How Does It Feel?"
16. "The Immortal Death"
17. "Don't Tell Me You Care"
18. "Rocky Eyed, Pt. 2"
19. "Sheep Farming in The Falklands"
20. "Gotcha"
21. Thread 7
22. "You're Already Dead"
23. "Nagasaki is Yesterday's Dog-End"
24. "Don't Get Caught"
25. "Smash The Mac"
26. Thread 8

==== CD 2 ====
1. "Do They Owe Us a Living?" (live in Aberdare, 7 July 1984)
2. Thread 9
3. "Who Dunnit?"
4. Thread 10
5. "Questions in the House"
6. Thread 11
7. Thatchergate tape
8. "Over the Rainbow"
9. "Eggar in Your Face" - radio interview with Penny Rimbaud about the "How Does it Feel?" single
10. Thread 12
11. "Sheep Farming in the Falklands" (unreleased version)
12. Thread 13
13. "Merry Crassmas"
14. Thread 14

== Song origins (1986 release) ==
Tracks 1–3 are from an early recording session on 27 February 1978.
Tracks 4 and 5 are from the "Reality Asylum" single, released in 1979.
Track 6 is from the "Bloody Revolutions / Persons Unknown" split single with Poison Girls, released in 1980.
Tracks 7 and 8 are from the "Nagasaki Nightmare" single, released 1980.
Track 9 is from the "Rival Tribal Rebel Revel" flexi-single, released in 1980 (later released on 7" vinyl).
Track 10 is from an anti-war flexi-single released anonymously in 1982.
Tracks 11–13 are from the "How Does It Feel (To Be The Mother of a Thousand Dead)?" single, released in 1982.
Tracks 14 and 15 are from the "Sheep Farming in The Falklands" single, released in 1983.
Tracks 16–18 are from the band's final single, "You're Already Dead", released in 1984.
Track 19 is previously unreleased.
Track 20 was recorded live at the band's final gig at Aberdare in 1984.
