= Darediablo =

American instrumental rock trio

Darediablo is an instrumental rock trio from New York City. They are influenced by 1970s heavy metal bands such as Black Sabbath and AC/DC, their bassist/guitarist often wearing an AC/DC T-Shirt. All their recordings have been independently released, starting on Orchard in 2000, with their latest being released on Southern Records main label (2003).

== History ==
Darediablo started in 2000 with Jake Garcia (bass guitar), Matthew Holford (Fender Rhodes, organ), and Peter Karp (drums). They changed drummers after their Sky Cohete/Subaquatico double EP, enlisting Chad Royce for Bedtime Stories, and Feeding Frenzy, as well as for live performances. Jake Garcia also started to play double-neck bass/guitar combo for live performances, and played guitar in addition to bass on Bedtime Stories. For Feeding Frenzy, he played only guitar.

They contributed the song "Shipping & Handling" to the television show Queer Eye for the Straight Guy, for February 2004.

== Description ==
Darediablo started out as a blend of hard rock, jazz, and stoner rock, but have focused these sounds into a style that is particularly suited to the instruments: an undersized bass ("the Midget") played with nods to Jake's guitar heroes, a Fender Rhodes and Hammond organ pumped through reams of effects and distortion, and a drummer.

Time Out New York has said, "darediablo is a smoking, sometimes atmospheric, bass-drum-organ trio that comes on like Medeski Martin & Wood with an MC5 fixation."

== Discography ==
=== Albums ===
- Tunnel of Fire (2000)
- Sky Cohete/Subaquatico (2001)
- Bedtime Stories (2002)
- Feeding Frenzy (2003)
- Twenty Paces (2005)
