= Ui (band) =

American post-rock/funk band

Background information
- Genres: Post-rock, funk
- Years active: 1990 to 2003
- Labels: Southern Records
- Members: Sasha Frere-Jones, Erik Sanko, Clem Waldmann, Wilbo Wright

Ui (pronounced ooo-eee) was an American post-rock/funk band based in New York City, which started in 1990. The group was started by Sasha Frere-Jones and Clem Waldmann. Wilbo Wright joined the group in 1993. The group's songs are often described as "bass-heavy", as the band frequently used two bass guitars. Other instruments used by the band include banjo, synthesizers, tuba and timpani. Their musical style is described to range between funk, dub, post-rock and electronica. The group had a high reliance on samplers and other studio equipment to overdub and articulate rhythms. The group disbanded in 2003 shortly after the recording of the album Answers.

== Discography ==
=== Full length ===
- Sidelong (Southern, March 1996)
- Lifelike (Southern, April 1998)
- Answers (Southern, June 2003)

=== EPs and remixes ===
- The 2-Sided EP (Hemiola, December 1993)
- Unlike: Remixes Volume 1 (Lunamoth, November 1995), remixes of material from The 2-Sided EP and Sidelong
- The Sharpie (Soul Static Sound, February 1996)
- Match My Foot 7" (Soul Static Sound, February 1996)
- Dropplike (Southern, August 1996), 3 remixes of songs from Sidelong
- Fires as the group name "Uilab" (Bingo; Duophonic Records, February 1998), Ui and Stereolab collaborating on versions of "St Elmo's Fire" by Brian Eno
- The Iron Apple (Southern, November 1999)

Ui have also remixed music for many groups, including Techno Animal and Microstoria.
