= The Feeding of the 5000 (album) =

1978 studio album by Crass

Studio album by Crass
- Released: 1978
- Recorded: 29 October 1978
- Studio: Southern (London, United Kingdom)
- Genre: Anarcho-punk
- Length: 31:50
- Label: Crass
- Producer: Crass

Crass chronology
The Feeding of the 5000 (1978)	Stations of the Crass (1979)

Alternative covers
- Cover of the remastered 'Crassical Collection' rerelease

Professional ratings
Review scores
Source	Rating
AllMusic	2/5 stars
Select	2/5 medals
Uncut	3/5 stars

The Feeding of the 5000 is the first album by the anarcho-punk band Crass. The album was recorded on 29 October 1978 by John Loder at Southern Studios and was released the same year. It was considered revolutionary in its time due for its extreme sound, frequently profane lyrical content and the anarchist political ideals in the lyrics. The album also saw the introduction of Crass's policy of ensuring cheap prices for their records. The album is considered as one of the first punk albums to expound serious anarchist philosophy.

== Album information ==
Pete Stennett, owner of Small Wonder Records, heard a demo that the band had recorded. Impressed by all of the material, he decided to package the entire set as an 18-track 12" EP. However, workers at the Irish pressing plant contracted to manufacture the record refused to process it because of the offensively blasphemous content of the track "Asylum". The record was eventually released with the track removed and replaced by two minutes of silence, retitled "The Sound of Free Speech". This incident also prompted Crass to establish their own record label in order to retain full editorial control over their material, and "Asylum" was issued shortly afterward in a rerecorded and extended form as a 7" single under the title "Reality Asylum". A later repress of The Feeding of The 5000 (subtitled The Second Sitting), released by Crass Records in 1980, restored the missing track.

Crass helped reinitiate the influence of the Campaign for Nuclear Disarmament and the wider peace campaign in the UK with the songs like "They've Got a Bomb", "Fight War Not Wars" and the adoption of the CND symbol at their live concerts.

"They've Got a Bomb" contains an extended period of silence, inspired by John Cage's "4'33"". The band have acknowledged the influence of Cage and said that the idea of the space in the song, when performed live, was to suddenly stop the energy, dancing and noise and allow the audience to momentarily "confront themselves" and consider the reality of nuclear war. However, fans were known to clap and cheer during the silent segment of the track, which is documented on the bonus live album included with the original release of Stations of the Crass.

The feeding of the multitude was a miraculous event described in the New Testament in which Jesus fed 5,000 people from just five loaves of bread and two fish. According to Crass drummer and founder Penny Rimbaud, "We named the album The Feeding of The Five Thousand because 5,000 was the minimum number that we could get pressed and some 4900 more than we thought we'd sell. Feeding is now only a few hundred short of going golden, though I don't suppose we'll hear too much about that in the music press".

On 16 August 2010, The Feeding of the 5000 was rereleased as the first volume of The Crassical Collection, digitally remastered from the original analogue studio tapes. The release also contains additional artwork by Gee Vaucher, bonus material and a 64-page booklet of lyrics and liner notes by Rimbaud and Steve Ignorant.

In December 2019, the band, in cooperation with One Little Indian Records, released the entire unedited 16-track master tape of the album for fans to remix, with selected results to be included on a compilation album with the working title "Normal Never Was". It was announced that the proceeds from the album would be given to the anti-domestic abuse charity Refuge.

On 2 October 2020, the Crassical Collection version was reissued, with the bonus tracks moved to a second CD.

== Track listing ==
Side A
No.	Title	Length
1.	"Asylum"	2:06
2.	"Do They Owe Us a Living?"	1:24
3.	"End Result"	2:04
4.	"They've Got a Bomb"	3:48
5.	"Punk Is Dead"	1:48
6.	"Reject of Society"	1:08
7.	"General Bacardi"	0:59
8.	"Banned from the Roxy"	2:14
9.	"G's Song"	0:36

Side B
No.	Title	Length
10.	"Fight War, Not Wars"	0:42
11.	"Women"	1:15
12.	"Securicor"	2:28
13.	"Sucks"	1:38
14.	"You Pay"	1:44
15.	"Angels"	2:08
16.	"What a Shame"	1:11
17.	"So What"	3:05
18.	"Well?...Do They?"	1:32

The Crassical Collection edition bonus tracks
No.	Title	Origin	Length
19.	"Do They Owe Us a Living?"	Ignorant and Rimbaud live at the Dial House, 1977 as Stormtrooper	5:43
20.	"Blackburn Rovers" (thread track)	Ignorant and Rimbaud live at the Dial House, 1977 as Stormtrooper	0:57
21.	"Heartbeat of the Mortuary"	Crass in Soho, 27 August 1977	1:45
22.	"Do They Owe Us a Living?"	Crass in Soho, 27 August 1977	2:17
23.	"Demolition"	Crass in Soho, 27 August 1977	1:55
24.	"I Don't Like It"	Crass in Soho, 27 August 1977	5:03
25.	"Pissedorf" (thread track)	Crass in Soho, 27 August 1977	1:05
26.	"End Result" (demo)	Southern Studios, February 1978	2:48
27.	"G's Song" (demo)	Southern Studios, February 1978	0:42
28.	"General Barcardi" (demo)	Southern Studios, February 1978	1:08
29.	"Securicor" (demo)	Southern Studios, February 1978	1:55
30.	"Angela Rippon" (demo)	Southern Studios, February 1978	1:04
31.	"Major General Despair" (demo)	Southern Studios, February 1978	1:20
32.	"Do They Owe Us a Living?" (demo)	Southern Studios, February 1978	1:45
33.	"Punk Is Dead" (demo)	Southern Studios, February 1978	4:34
34.	"Come to Southern Studios" (runout track)	Southern Studios, February 1978	0:20

== Personnel ==
- Crass - producer
- Steve Ignorant - vocals
- Joy De Vivre - voice on track 11
- Eve Libertine - voice on track 1
- Phil Free - lead guitar, backing vocals
- N.A.Palmer - rhythm guitar, backing vocals
- Pete Wright - bass guitar, backing vocals, lead vocals on tracks 12, 13, 14
- Penny Rimbaud - drums, radio
- John Loder - engineer
- G (Gee Vaucher) - artwork
