= John Loder (sound engineer) =

English engineer and record producer

- Born: 7 April 1946; Newton Abbot, Devon, England
- Died: 12 August 2005 (aged 59); London, England
- Occupations: Audio engineer, record producer

John F. Loder (7 April 1946 – 12 August 2005) was an English sound engineer, record producer and founder of Southern Studios, as well as a former member of EXIT and co-founder of the Southern Records distribution company with his wife Sue. He was also the studio engineer of choice for Crass and Crass Records, and was often considered to be the band's "ninth member".

Loder was born near Plymouth and educated at boarding school before studying electrical engineering at London's City University. During his post-graduate work there, he became involved in early experiments in digital encoding of audio for the military. By 1970 he had joined EXIT, alongside Penny Rimbaud, utilising a one-track tape-recorder. This led to Loder eventually founding a record studio in his garage after the disbanding of EXIT in 1974. Loder was recording advertising jingles in 1977 when his path crossed once again with Rimbaud, who had by then co-founded Crass, and invited Loder to become the band's engineer and financial manager, roles Loder happily accepted.

When Crass founded their own record label, Loder worked as an engineer on most of the label's releases, and when Loder saw potential in a number of bands turned away by Crass Records, Loder set up Southern Records.

Loder engineered and produced for many bands other than Crass, among them the Jesus and Mary Chain (for whom he engineered the recordings of the Psychocandy album), Big Black (Songs About Fucking), PJ Harvey, Babes in Toyland, Fugazi (mastering the vinyl edition of 2001's The Argument), Ministry and Shellac (mastering 2000's 1000 Hurts). American musician and recording engineer Steve Albini (member of Big Black and Shellac), has spoken highly of Loder and described him as a critical influence:

When I was in Big Black we did a session with him, and I thought he was a terrific engineer. He showed me the potential for getting the most out of the equipment without making the equipment the focus of attention. He knew how to do things quickly and with great sensitivity to the band, and had a complete working knowledge of his equipment. In any situation he could snap his fingers and do the right thing, because he knew exactly how things worked and what to do.

In the mid-1980s, Loder established a television production facility at Southern. Its notable output included the music show Snub TV, which after first being syndicated nationwide in the US, went on to further success on BBC2 and in other countries.

Loder was responsible for encouraging and establishing independent alternative ezines, donating the use of Southern's servers and bandwidth, taking part in pioneering online media streaming and simulcasting.

Loder died of a brain tumour on 12 August 2005, aged 59.
