= EXIT (performance art group) =

EXIT were a performance art group during the mid-1970s. EXIT members Penny Rimbaud and Gee Vaucher later founded anarchist punk rock band Crass, adopting many of EXIT's experimental/multi media techniques into Crass' presentation.

The group performed as part of the 1972 ICES festival at the Roundhouse.

Rimbaud acknowledges that EXIT in turn had been involved with the Fluxus Movement (of which Yoko Ono was a member). He also states that Crass was more influenced by the avant-garde than by any rock & roll precedent.

== Discography ==
- EXIT The Mystic Trumpeter - Live at the Roundhouse 1972, The ICES Tapes (Exit Stencil Music Cat No. EXMO2, CD and book, 2013)
