= Crass =

English punk rock band (1977–1984)

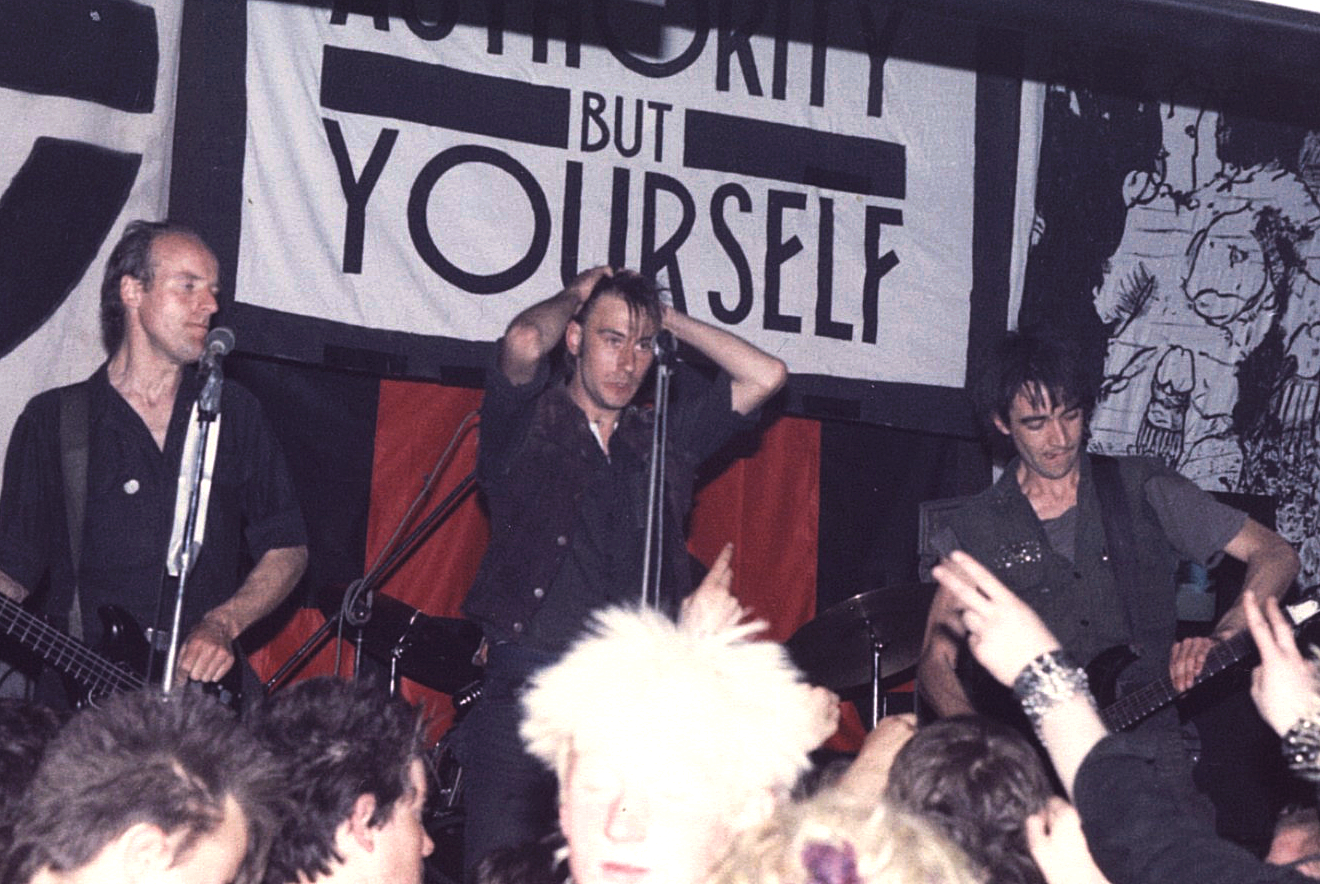
- Crass on stage in Cumbria in May 1984, with the slogan "there is no authority but yourself" in the background. From left to right: Pete Wright, Steve Ignorant, and N.A. Palmer.

Background information
- Also known as: Stormtrooper (1977)
- Origin: Epping, Essex, England
- Genres: Anarcho-punk; art punk
- Years active: 1977–1984
- Labels: Small Wonder; Crass; Southern
- Past members: Steve Ignorant; Penny Rimbaud; Gee Vaucher; N. A. Palmer; Phil Free; Pete Wright; Eve Libertine; Joy De Vivre; Mick Duffield; John Loder; Steve Herman

Crass was an English art collective and punk rock band formed in Epping, Essex, in 1977 who promoted anarchism as a political ideology, a lifestyle, and a resistance movement. Crass popularised the anarcho-punk movement of the punk subculture, advocating direct action, animal rights, feminism, and environmentalism. The band employed and advocated a DIY ethic in its albums, sound collages, leaflets, and films.

Crass spray-painted stencilled graffiti messages on the London Underground and on advertising-billboards, coordinated squats and organized political action. The band expressed its ideals by dressing in black, military-surplus-style clothing and using a stage backdrop amalgamating icons of perceived authority such as the Christian cross, the swastika, the Union Jack, and the ouroboros.

The band was critical of the punk subculture and youth culture in general; nevertheless, the anarchist ideas that they promoted have maintained a presence in punk. Because of their free experimentation and use of tape collages, graphics, spoken word releases, poetry, and improvisation, Crass has been associated with avant-punk and art punk.

== History ==
=== 1977: Origins ===
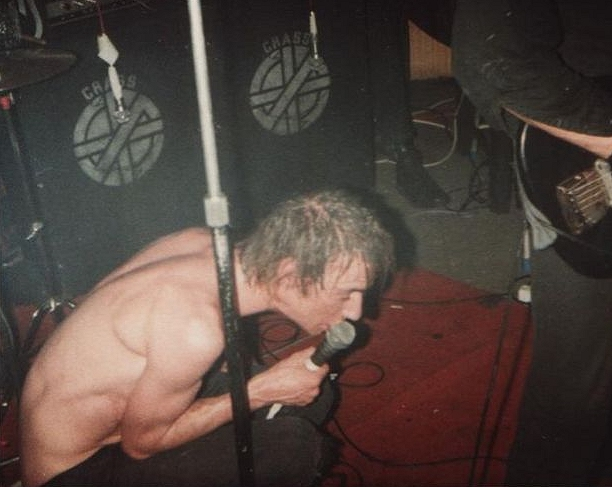
Steve Ignorant on stage, June 1981

The band was based around an anarchist commune in a 16th-century cottage, Dial House, near Epping, Essex, and formed when commune founder Penny Rimbaud began jamming with Steve Ignorant (who was staying in the house at the time). Ignorant was inspired to form a band after seeing the Clash perform at Colston Hall in Bristol, whilst Rimbaud, a veteran of avant-garde performance art groups such as EXIT and Ceres Confusion, was working on his book Reality Asylum. They produced "So What?" and "Do They Owe Us a Living?" as a drum-and-vocal duo. They briefly called themselves Stormtrooper before choosing Crass in reference to a line in the David Bowie song "Ziggy Stardust" ("The kids were just crass").

Other friends and household members joined (including Gee Vaucher, Pete Wright, N. A. Palmer and Steve Herman), and Crass played their first live gig at a squatters' street festival in Huntley Street, North London. They planned to play five songs, but a neighbour "pulled the plug" after three. Guitarist Steve Herman left the band soon afterward and was replaced by Phil Clancey, a.k.a. Phil Free. Joy De Vivre and Eve Libertine also joined around this time. Other early Crass performances included a four-date tour of New York City, a festival gig in Covent Garden and regular appearances with the U.K. Subs at The White Lion, Putney and Action Space in central London. The latter performances were often poorly attended: "The audience consisted mostly of us when the Subs played and the Subs when we played".

Crass played two gigs at the Roxy Club in Covent Garden, London. According to Rimbaud, the band arrived drunk at the second show and were ejected from the stage; this inspired their song "Banned from the Roxy" and Rimbaud's essay for Crass's self-published magazine International Anthem, "Crass at the Roxy". After the incident, the band took themselves more seriously, avoiding alcohol and cannabis before shows and wearing black, military-surplus-style clothing on and off the stage.

Crass logo

They introduced their stage backdrop, a logo designed by Rimbaud's friend Dave King. This gave the band a militaristic image, which led to accusations of fascism. Crass countered that their uniform appearance was intended to be a statement against the "cult of personality" so that no member would be identified as the "leader".

Conceived and intended as cover artwork for a self-published pamphlet version of Rimbaud's Christ's Reality Asylum, the Crass logo was an amalgam of several "icons of authority" including the Christian cross, the swastika, the Union Jack and a two-headed Ouroboros (symbolising the idea that power will eventually destroy itself). Using such deliberately mixed messages was part of Crass's strategy of presenting themselves as a "barrage of contradictions", challenging audiences to (in Rimbaud's words) "make your own fucking minds up". This included using loud, aggressive music to promote a pacifist message, a reference to their Dadaist, performance-art backgrounds and situationist ideas.

The band eschewed elaborate stage lighting during live sets, preferring to play under 40-watt household light bulbs; the technical difficulties of filming under such lighting conditions partly explains why there is little live footage of Crass. They pioneered multimedia presentation, using video technology (back-projected films and video collages by Mick Duffield and Gee Vaucher) to enhance their performances, and also distributed leaflets and handouts explaining anarchist ideas to their audiences.

=== 1978–1979: The Feeding of the 5000 and Crass Records ===
Crass' first release was The Feeding of the 5000 (an 18-track, 12" 45 rpm EP on the Small Wonder label) in 1978. Workers at an Irish record-pressing plant refused to process it because of the offensive and blasphemous content of the song "Asylum", and the record was released without it. In its place were two minutes of silence titled "The Sound of Free Speech". This incident prompted Crass to create their own independent record label, Crass Records, to retain editorial control over their material.

A rerecorded, extended version of "Asylum", renamed "Reality Asylum", was released shortly afterward on Crass Records as a 7" single, and Crass were investigated by the police because of the song's lyrics. The band were interviewed at their Dial House home by Scotland Yard's vice squad and threatened with prosecution, but the case was dropped. "Reality Asylum" retailed at 45p (when most other singles cost about 90p), and was the first example of Crass' "pay no more than..." policy to issue records as inexpensively as possible. The band failed to factor value-added tax into their expenses, causing them to lose money on every copy sold. A year later, Crass Records released new pressings of The Feeding of the 5000 (subtitled "The Second Sitting"), restoring the original version of "Asylum".

=== 1980: Stations of the Crass and "Bloody Revolutions" ===
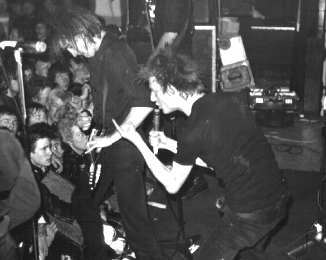
Crass, 1981; N. A. Palmer (left) and Steve Ignorant pictured at Digbeth Civic Hall, Birmingham

In 1979 the band released their second album, Stations of the Crass, financed with a loan from Poison Girls, a band with whom they regularly appeared. This was a double album, with three sides of new material and a fourth side recorded live at the Pied Bull in Islington.

The next Crass single, 1980's "Bloody Revolutions", was a benefit release with Poison Girls that raised £20,000 to fund the Wapping Autonomy Centre. The words were a critique (from an anarchist-pacifist perspective) of the traditional Marxist view of revolutionary struggle and were partly a response to violence marring a September 1979 Crass gig at Conway Hall in London's Red Lion Square. The show was intended as a benefit for Persons Unknown, a group of anarchists facing conspiracy charges. During the performance, Socialist Workers Party supporters and other anti-fascists attacked British Movement neo-Nazis, triggering violence. Crass later argued that the leftists were largely to blame for the fighting, and organizations such as Rock Against Racism were causing audiences to become polarised into left- and right-wing factions. Others (including the anarchist organisation Class War) were critical of Crass's position, stating that "like Kropotkin, their politics are up shit creek". Many of the band's punk followers felt that they failed to understand the violence to which they were subjected from the right.

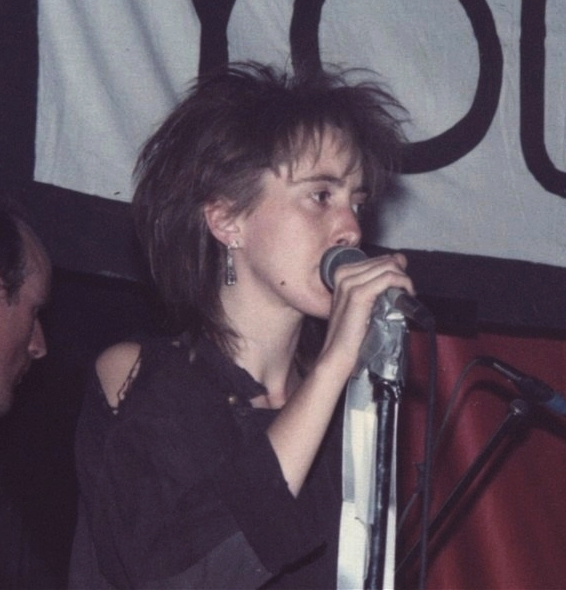
Crass singer Joy De Vivre, 1984

"Rival Tribal Rebel Revel", a flexi disc single distributed with the Toxic Grafity [sic] fanzine, was also a commentary about the events at Conway Hall attacking the mindless violence and tribalistic aspects of contemporary youth culture. This was followed by the double single "Nagasaki Nightmare/Big A Little A". The strongly anti-nuclear lyrics of "Nagasaki Nightmare" were reinforced by the fold-out sleeve artwork. It featured an article by Mike Holderness of Peace News magazine connecting the atomic power industry and the manufacture of nuclear weapons along with a large poster-style map of nuclear installations in the UK. The other side of the record, "Big A Little A", was a statement of the band's anti-statist and individualist anarchist philosophy: "Be exactly who you want to be, do what you want to do / I am he and she is she but you're the only you."

=== 1981: Penis Envy ===
Loving ad for "Our Wedding"

Crass released their third album, Penis Envy, in 1981. This marked a departure from the hardcore punk image that The Feeding of the 5000 and Stations of the Crass had given the group. It featured more complex musical arrangements and female vocals by Eve Libertine and Joy De Vivre (singer Steve Ignorant was credited as "not on this recording"). The album addressed feminist issues, attacking marriage and sexual repression.

The last track on Penis Envy, a parody of an MOR love song titled "Our Wedding", was made available as a white flexi disc to readers of Loving, a teenage romance magazine. Crass tricked the magazine into offering the disc, posing as "Creative Recording and Sound Services". Loving accepted the offer, telling their readers that the free Crass flexi would make "your wedding day just that bit extra special". A tabloid controversy resulted when the hoax was exposed, with the News of the World stating that the title of the flexi's originating album was "too obscene to print". Despite Loving's annoyance, Crass had broken no laws.

The album was banned by the retailer HMV, and copies of the album were seized from the Eastern Bloc record shop by Greater Manchester Police under the direction of chief constable James Anderton. The shop owners were charged with displaying "obscene articles for publication for gain". The judge ruled against Crass in the ensuing court case, although the decision was overturned by the Court of Appeal (except the lyrics to "Bata Motel", which were upheld as "sexually provocative and obscene").

=== 1982–1983: Christ - The Album and strategy-change ===
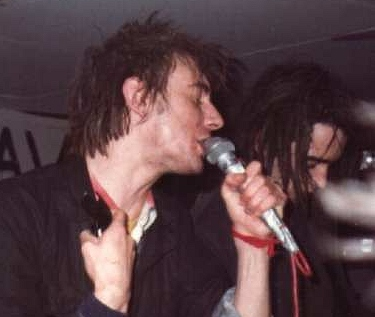
Steve Ignorant and N.A. Palmer pictured at the Wapping Autonomy Centre, December 1981

The band's fourth LP, 1982's double set Christ – The Album, took almost a year to record, produce and mix (during which the Falklands War began and ended). This caused Crass to question their approach to making records. As a group whose primary purpose was political commentary, they felt overtaken and made redundant by world events:

The speed with which the Falklands War was played out and the devastation that Thatcher was creating both at home and abroad forced us to respond far faster than we had ever needed to before. Christ – The Album had taken so long to produce that some of the songs in it, songs that warned of the imminence of riots and war, had become almost redundant. Toxteth, Bristol, Brixton and the Falklands were ablaze by the time that we released. We felt embarrassed by our slowness, humbled by our inadequacy.

Subsequent releases (including the singles "How Does It Feel? (To Be the Mother of a Thousand Dead)" and "Sheep Farming in the Falklands" and the album Yes Sir, I Will) saw the band's sound return to basics and were issued as "tactical responses" to political situations. Crass anonymously produced 20,000 copies of a flexi disc with a live recording of "Sheep Farming in the Falklands", and copies were randomly inserted into the sleeves of other records by sympathetic workers at the Rough Trade Records distribution warehouse.

=== Direct action and internal debates ===
Detail from front cover of Stations of the Crass, illustrating Crass' stenciled graffiti

From their early days of spraying stencilled anti-war, anarchist, feminist and anti-consumerist graffiti messages in the London Underground and on billboards, Crass was involved in politically motivated direct action and musical activities. On 18 December 1982, the band helped coordinate a 24-hour squat in the empty West London Zig Zag club to prove "that the underground punk scene could handle itself responsibly when it had to and that music really could be enjoyed free of the restraints imposed upon it by corporate industry".

In 1983 and 1984, Crass were part of the Stop the City actions coordinated by London Greenpeace that foreshadowed the anti-globalisation rallies of the early 21st century. Support for these activities was provided in the lyrics and sleeve notes of the band's last single, "You're Already Dead", expressing doubts about their commitment to nonviolence. It was also a reflection of disagreements within the group, as explained by Rimbaud: "Half the band supported the pacifist line and half supported direct and if necessary violent action. It was a confusing time for us, and I think a lot of our records show that, inadvertently". This led to introspection within the band, with some members becoming embittered and losing sight of their essentially positive stance. Reflecting this debate, the next release under the Crass name was Acts of Love: classical-music settings of 50 poems by Penny Rimbaud, described as "songs to my other self" and intended to celebrate "the profound sense of unity, peace and love that exists within that other self".

=== Thatchergate ===
Another Crass hoax was known as the "Thatchergate tapes", a recording of an apparently accidentally overheard telephone conversation (because of crossed lines). The tape was constructed by Crass from edited recordings of Margaret Thatcher and Ronald Reagan. On the "rather clumsily" forged tape, they appear to discuss the sinking of HMS Sheffield during the Falklands War and agree that Europe would be a target for nuclear weapons in a conflict between the United States and the Soviet Union.

Copies were leaked to the press via a Dutch news agency during the 1983 general election campaign. The U.S. State Department and British government believed the tape to be propaganda produced by the KGB (as reported by the San Francisco Chronicle and The Sunday Times). Although the tape was produced anonymously, The Observer linked the tape with the band. Previously classified government documents made public in January 2014 under the UK's thirty-year rule reveal that Thatcher was aware of the tape and had discussed it with her cabinet.

=== 1984: Breakup ===
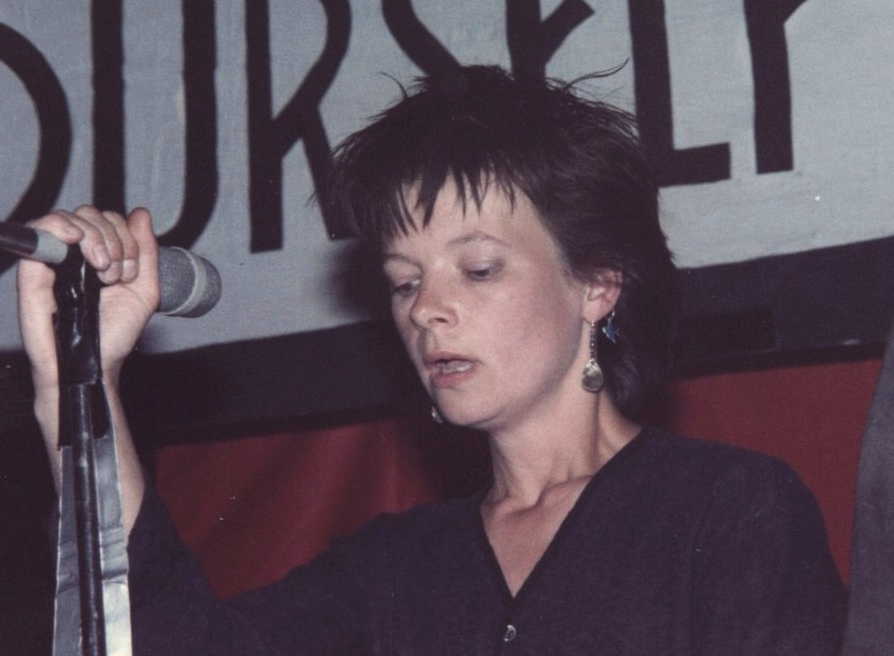
Eve Libertine, May 1984

Questions about the band in Parliament and an attempted prosecution by Conservative Party MP Timothy Eggar under the UK's Obscene Publications Act for their single "How Does It Feel..." made the members of Crass question their purpose:

We found ourselves in a strange and frightening arena. We had wanted to make our views public, had wanted to share them with like minded people, but now those views were being analysed by those dark shadows who inhabited the corridors of power ... We had gained a form of political power, found a voice, were being treated with a slightly awed respect, but was that really what we wanted? Was that what we had set out to achieve all those years ago?

The band had also incurred heavy legal expenses for the Penis Envy prosecution; this, combined with exhaustion and the pressures of living and operating together, finally took its toll. On 7 July 1984, the band played a benefit-gig at Aberdare, Wales for striking miners, and on the return trip, guitarist N. A. Palmer announced his intent to leave the group. This confirmed Crass's previous intention to quit in 1984, and the band was dissolved.

The group's final release as Crass was the "Ten Notes on a Summer's Day" 12" single in 1986. Crass Records was closed in 1992; its final release was Christ's Reality Asylum, a 90-minute cassette of Penny Rimbaud reading the essay that he had written in early 1977.

On 11 July 2024, the full 7 July 1984 concert was released as a free download to celebrate its 40th anniversary, albeit as a poor and upscaled tape transfer.

=== Crass Collective, Crass Agenda, and Last Amendment ===
In November 2002 several former members arranged Your Country Needs You, a concert of "voices in opposition to war", as the Crass Collective. At Queen Elizabeth Hall on London's South Bank, Your Country Needs You included Benjamin Britten's War Requiem and performances by Goldblade, Fun-Da-Mental, Ian MacKaye and Pete Wright's post-Crass project, Judas 2. In October 2003 the Crass Collective changed their name to Crass Agenda, with Rimbaud, Libertine and Vaucher working with Matt Black of Coldcut and jazz musicians such as Julian Siegel and Kate Shortt. In 2004 Crass Agenda spearheaded a campaign to save the Vortex Jazz Club in Stoke Newington, north London (where they regularly played). In June 2005 Crass Agenda was declared to be "no more", changing its name to the "more pertinent" Last Amendment. After a five-year hiatus, Last Amendment performed at the Vortex in June 2012. Rimbaud has also performed and recorded with Japanther and the Charlatans. A "new" Crass track (a remix of 1982's "Major General Despair" with new lyrics), "The Unelected President", is available.

=== 2007: Ignorant's The Feeding of the 5000 ===
Poster for the 5000 performance, November 2007

On 24 and 25 November 2007, Steve Ignorant performed Crass' The Feeding of the 5000 album live at the Shepherd's Bush Empire with a band of "selected guests". Other members of Crass were not involved in these concerts. Initially Rimbaud refused Ignorant permission to perform Crass songs he had written, but later changed his mind: "I acknowledge and respect Steve's right to do this, but I do regard it as a betrayal of the Crass ethos". Ignorant had a different view: "I don't have to justify what I do...Plus, most of the lyrics are still relevant today. And remember that three-letter word, 'fun'?"

=== 2010: Crassical Collection reissues ===
In 2010 it was announced that Crass would release The Crassical Collection, remastered reissues of their back catalogue. Three former members objected, threatening legal action. Despite their concerns the project went ahead, and the remasters were eventually released. First in the series was The Feeding of the 5000, released in August 2010. Stations of the Crass followed in October, with new editions of Penis Envy, Christ – The Album, Yes Sir, I Will and Ten Notes on a Summer's Day released in 2011 and 2012. Critics praised the improved sound quality and new packaging of the remastered albums.

=== 2011: The Last Supper ===
In 2011 Steve Ignorant embarked on an international tour, titled "The Last Supper". He performed Crass material, culminating with a final performance at the Shepherd's Bush Empire on 19 November. Ignorant said that this was the last time he would sing the songs of Crass, with Rimbaud's support; the latter joined him onstage for a drum-and-vocal rendition of "Do They Owe Us A Living", bringing the band's career full circle after 34 years: "And then Penny came on...and we did it, 'Do They Owe Us A Living' as we'd first done it all those years ago. As it started, so it finished". Ignorant's lineup for the tour were Gizz Butt, Carol Hodge, Pete Wilson and Spike T. Smith, and he was joined by Eve Libertine for a number of songs. The set list included a cover of "West One (Shine on Me)" by The Ruts, when Ignorant was joined onstage by the Norfolk-based lifeboat crew with whom he volunteers.

=== Artwork and exhibitions ===
In February 2011, artist Toby Mott exhibited a portion of his Crass ephemera collection at the Roth Gallery in New York. The exhibit featured artwork, albums (including 12" LPs and EPs), 7" singles from Crass Records and a complete set of Crass' self-published zine, Inter-National Anthem.

Artwork by Gee Vaucher and Penny Rimbaud, including a recording of the original 'Thatchergate Tape', featured as part of the 'Peculiar People' show at the Focal Point Gallery in Southend-on-Sea during the spring of 2016, part of a series of events celebrating the history of 'Radical Essex'. Vaucher's painting Oh America, featuring an image of the Statue of Liberty hiding her face with her hands, was used as the front page of the UK Daily Mirror newspaper to mark the election of Donald Trump as US President on 9 November 2016. From November 2016 to February 2017 the Firstsite art gallery in Colchester, hosted a retrospective of Gee Vaucher's artwork.

In June 2016, "The Art of Crass" was the subject of an exhibition at the LightBox Gallery in Leicester curated by artist and technologist Sean Clark. The exhibition featured prints and original artworks by Gee Vaucher, Penny Rimbaud, Eve Libertine, and Dave King. During the exhibition, Penny Rimbaud, Eve Libertine, and Louise Elliot performed "The Cobblestones of Love", a lyrical reworking of the Crass album "Yes Sir, I Will". On the final day of the exhibition there was a performance by Steve Ignorant's Slice of Life. The exhibition is documented on The Art of Crass website.

== Influences ==
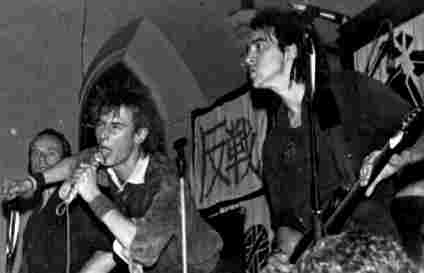
Crass onstage

For Rimbaud the initial inspiration for founding Crass was the death of his friend Phil 'Wally Hope' Russell, as detailed in his book The Last of the Hippies: An Hysterical Romance. Russell had been placed in a psychiatric hospital after helping to set up the first Stonehenge free festival in 1974, and died shortly afterwards. Rimbaud believed that Russell was murdered by the State for political reasons. Co-founder Ignorant has cited The Clash and David Bowie as major personal influences. Band members have also cited influences ranging from existentialism and Zen to situationism, the poetry of Baudelaire, British working class 'kitchen sink' literature and films such as Kes and the films of Anthony McCall (McCall's Four Projected Movements was shown as part of an early Crass performance).

Crass have said that their musical influences were seldom drawn from rock, but more from classical music (particularly Benjamin Britten, on whose work, Rimbaud states, some of Crass' riffs are based), free jazz, European atonality, and avant-garde composers such as John Cage and Karlheinz Stockhausen.

== Legacy ==
Crass influenced the anarchist movement in the UK, the US and beyond. The growth of anarcho-punk spurred interest in anarchist ideas. The band have also claimed credit for revitalising the peace movement and the UK Campaign for Nuclear Disarmament during the late 1970s and early 1980s. Others contend that they overestimated their influence, their radicalising effect on militants notwithstanding. Researcher Richard Cross stated:

In their own writing, Crass somewhat overstate the contribution that anarcho-punk made to resuscitating the moribund Campaign for Nuclear Disarmament (CND) in the early 1980s. The initiation of a new arms race, confirmed by plans to deploy first-strike Cruise and Pershing nuclear missiles across Europe, revived anti-nuclear movements across the continent, and would have arisen with or without the intercession of anarcho-punk. What Crass and anarcho-punk can quite legitimately claim is to have convinced a substantial number of radical youth to commit their energies to the most militant anti-militarist wings of the disarmament movement, which laid siege to nuclear installations across the country and which saw no conflict between its pacifist precepts and its willingness to commit acts of 'criminal damage' on the military property of the nuclear state.

Crass' philosophical and aesthetic influences on 1980s punk bands were far-reaching. A notable example is Washington, D.C.'s Dischord Records co-founder Ian MacKaye, who followed some of Crass' anti-consumerist and DIY principles in his own label and projects, particularly with the post-hardcore band Fugazi. However, few mimicked their later free-form style (heard on Yes Sir, I Will and their final recording, Ten Notes on a Summer's Day). Their painted and collage black-and-white record sleeves (by Gee Vaucher) may have influenced later artists such as Banksy (with whom Vaucher collaborated) and the subvertising movement. Anti-folk artist Jeffrey Lewis's 2007 album, 12 Crass Songs, features acoustic covers of Crass material. Brett Anderson, in his early teens at the time, was a big fan of the band, would play their records at home and much later cited them in a radio interview, when asked about what band or artist had first made him want to get up on stage as a singer: "Crass! Their energy on stage was incredible, I was very impressed".

In an interview with The Guardian in 2016, the band was cited along with a number of other British Anarcho-punk bands of the early 1980s as being an influence to the American avant-garde metal group Neurosis.

== Members ==
- Steve Ignorant (vocals)
- Eve Libertine (vocals)
- Joy De Vivre (vocals)
- N. A. Palmer (guitar)
- Phil Free (guitar)
- Pete Wright (bass, vocals)
- Penny Rimbaud (drums, vocals)
- Gee Vaucher (artwork, piano, radio)
- Mick Duffield (films)
- John Loder, sound engineer and founder of Southern Studios, is sometimes considered the "ninth member" of Crass. (died 2005)
- Steve Herman (guitar; left shortly after their first performance and died on 4 February 1989)

== Discography ==
(All released on Crass Records unless otherwise stated.)

=== LPs ===
- The Feeding of the 5000 (LP, 1978, 45 rpm, Small Wonder Records – UK Indie – No. 1. Reissued in 1980 as LP 33 rpm as The Feeding of the 5000 – Second Sitting, UK Indie – No. 11)
- Stations of the Crass (521984, double LP, 1979) (UK Indie – No. 1)
- Penis Envy (321984/1, LP, 1981) (UK Indie – No. 1)
- Christ – The Album (BOLLOX 2U2, double LP, 1982) (UK Indie – No. 1)
- Yes Sir, I Will (121984/2, LP, 1983) (UK Indie – No. 1)
- Ten Notes on a Summer's Day (catalog No. 6, LP, 1986, Crass Records) (UK Indie – No. 6)

=== Compilations and remastered editions ===
- Best Before 1984 (1986 – CATNO5; compilation album of singles) (UK Indie – No. 7)
- The Feeding of the 5000 (The Crassical Collection) (2010 – CC01CD remastered edition)
- Stations of the Crass (The Crassical Collection) (2010 – CC02CD remastered edition)
- Penis Envy (The Crassical Collection) (2010 – CC03CD remastered edition)
- Christ – The Album (The Crassical Collection) (2011 – CC04CD remastered edition)
- Yes Sir, I Will (The Crassical Collection) (2011 – CC05CD remastered edition)
- Ten Notes on a Summer's Day (The Crassical Collection) (2012 – CC06CD remastered edition)

=== Singles ===
- "Reality Asylum" / "Shaved Women" (CRASS1, 7", 1979) (UK Indie – No. 9)
- "Bloody Revolutions" / "Persons Unknown" (421984/1, 7" single, joint released with the Poison Girls, 1980) (UK Indie – No. 1)
- "Rival Tribal Rebel Revel" (421984/6F, one-sided 7" flexi disc single given away with Toxic Grafity [sic] fanzine, 1980)
- "Nagasaki Nightmare" / "Big A Little A" (421984/5, 7" single, 1981) (UK Indie – No. 1)
- "Our Wedding" (321984/1F, one-sided 7" flexi-disc single by Creative Recording And Sound Services made available to readers of teenage magazine Loving)
- "Merry Crassmas" (CT1, 7" single, 1981, Crass' stab at the Christmas novelty market) (UK Indie – No. 2)
- "Sheep Farming in the Falklands" / "Gotcha" (121984/3, 7" single, 1982, originally released anonymously as a flexi-disc) (UK Indie – No. 1, UK Singles Chart: No 106)
- "How Does It Feel To Be The Mother of 1000 Dead?" / "The Immortal Death" (221984/6, 7" single, 1983) (UK Indie – No. 1)
- "Whodunnit?" (121984/4, 7" single, 1983, pressed in "shit-coloured vinyl") (UK Indie – No. 2, UK Singles Chart – No.119)
- "You're Already Dead" / "Nagasaki is Yesterday's Dog-End" / "Don't Get Caught" (1984, 7" single. UK Singles Chart – No.166)

=== Other ===
- Penny Rimbaud Reads From 'Christ's Reality Asylum' (Cat No. 10C, C90 cassette, 1992)
- Acts of Love – Fifty Songs to my Other Self by Penny Rimbaud with Paul Ellis, Eve Libertine and Steve Ignorant (Cat No. 1984/4, LP and book, 1984. Reissued as CD and book as Exitstencilisms Cat No. EXT001 2012)
- EXIT The Mystic Trumpeter – Live at the Roundhouse 1972, The ICES Tapes (pre Crass material featuring Penny Rimbaud, Gee Vaucher, John Loder and others) (Exit Stencil Music Cat No. EXMO2, CD and book, 2013)

=== Live recordings ===
- Christ: The Bootleg (recorded live in Nottingham, 1984, released 1989 on Allied Records)
- You'll Ruin It For Everyone (recorded live in Perth, Scotland, 1981, released 1993 on Pomona Records)

=== Videos ===
Crass

- Christ: The Movie (a series of short films by Mick Duffield that were shown at Crass performances, VHS, released 1990)
- Semi-Detached (video collages by Gee Vaucher, 1978–84, VHS, 2001)
- Crass: There Is No Authority But Yourself (documentary by Alexander Oey, 2006) documenting the history of Crass and Dial House.
- Crass: The Sound of Free Speech - The Story of Reality Asylum (documentary by Brandon Spivey)

Crass Agenda

- In the Beginning Was the WORD – Live DVD recorded at the Progress Bar, Tufnell Park, London, 18 November 2004

== See also ==
- Anarchism and the arts
- Punk ideologies
- Animal rights and punk subculture

== Suggested viewing ==
- The Art of Punk – Crass (The Museum of Contemporary Art) (2013) – Documentary featuring the art of Dave King and Gee Vaucher

== Bibliography ==
- Berger, George (2006). The Story of Crass. Omnibus Press. ISBN 978-0-85712-012-0.
- Bounds, Philip (2014). "Anarchy, for a While". Notes from the End of History. London: Merlin Press.
- Cogan, Brian (2007). ""Do They Owe Us a Living? Of Course They Do!" Crass, Throbbing Gristle, and Anarchy and Radicalism in Early English Punk Rock". Journal for the Study of Radicalism. 1 (2): 77–90. doi:10.1353/jsr.2008.0004. ISSN 1930-1189. JSTOR 41887578. S2CID 143586670.
- Cross, Richard (2004). "The Hippies Now Wear Black: Crass and the anarcho-punk movement, 1977–1984". Socialist History (26). Socialist History Society. Archived from the original on 31 May 2019.
- Cross, Richard (2010). "'There Is No Authority But Yourself': The Individual and the Collective in British Anarcho-Punk" (PDF). Music and Politics. 4 (2). ISSN 1938-7687. Archived from the original (PDF) on 4 June 2011.
- Glasper, Ian (2007). The Day the Country Died: A History of Anarcho Punk 1980 to 1984. Cherry Red Books. ISBN 978-1-901447-70-5.
- Ignorant, Steve; Pottinger, Steve (2010). The Rest is Propaganda. Southern Records. ISBN 978-0-9566746-0-9.
- McKay, George (1996). "Chapter three: 'CRASS 621984 ANOK4U2'". Senseless Acts of Beauty: Cultures of Resistance since the Sixties. Verso Books. ISBN 1-85984-028-0.
- McKay, George (2 September 2019). ""They've Got a Bomb": Sounding Anti-nuclearism in the Anarcho-punk Movement in Britain, 1978–84". Rock Music Studies. 6 (3): 217–236. doi:10.1080/19401159.2019.1673076. S2CID 213764792.
- Mott, Toby (2011). Crass 1977 – 1984. PPP Editions.
- Rimbaud, Penny (1999a). Shibboleth: my revolting life. AK Press. ISBN 978-1-873176-40-5.
- Rimbaud, Penny (1999b). The Diamond Signature. AK Press. ISBN 978-1-873176-55-9.
- Rimbaud, Penny (2004). Love Songs. Pomona Books. ISBN 978-1-904590-03-3.
- Vaucher, Gee (1999). Crass Art and other Post Modern Monsters. AK Press. ISBN 978-1-873176-10-8.
- A Series of Shock Slogans and Mindless Token Tantrums. Exitstencil Press. 1982. (originally issued as a pamphlet with the LP Christ – The Album, much of the text is now published online at "Southern Records". Archived from the original on 4 April 2005.)
- International Anthem: A Nihilist Newspaper for the Living. Exitstencil Press. 1977–81. (see "Crass Discography". Southern Records. Archived from the original on 15 April 2003.)
