= Dial House, Essex =

Listed building in Essex, England

Coordinates: 51.7122°N 0.1893°E

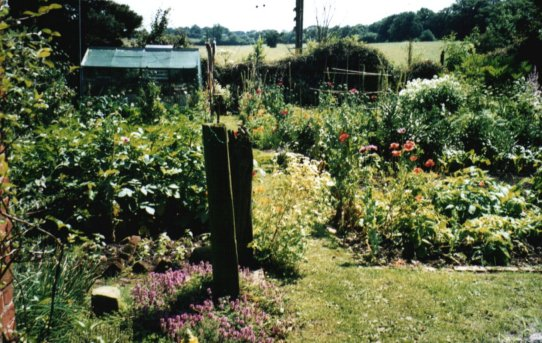
The vegetable garden

Dial House is a farm cottage situated in south-west Essex, England that has been a self-sustaining anarcho-pacifist open house since 1967. The house is located in the countryside of Epping Forest in Ongar Great Park. It has been used as a base for a number of cultural, artistic, and political projects ranging from avant-garde jazz events to helping found the free festival movement.

Perhaps the best-known manifestation of the public face of Dial House was the anarcho-punk band Crass. Following the DIY punk ethic, Crass combined the use of song, film, sound collage, and graphics to launch a critical polemic against a mainstream which they considered to be built on foundations of war, religion, and consumerism.

== History ==
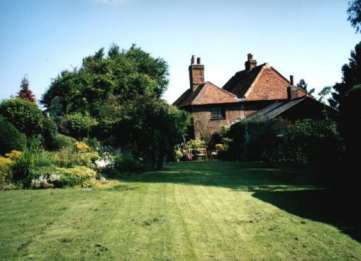
Dial House in summer

=== Early history ===
Dial House, a large rambling farm cottage, was built in the 16th century. Oliver Rackham describes Ongar Great Park as possibly having been the "prototype deer park", mentioned in an "Anglo-Saxon will of 1045". During the Victorian era, Dial House was the home of the writer Primrose McConnell, a tenant farmer and the author of The Agricultural Notebook (1883), which is recognised as a standard reference work for the European farming industry. By 1967 Dial House stood derelict, its acre of garden a bramble-smothered wilderness. Dial House is Grade II listed on the National Heritage List for England.

=== Crass ===
In 1967, Penny Rimbaud (later the drummer of Crass) began using Dial House as an open space, removing doors and inviting friends to stay in the cottage. Rimbaud moved into the house with Gee Vaucher and established an "open house" policy. Dial House became the site of organising for the anarchist movement, including the Stonehenge Free Festival.
