= Southern Studios =

Recording studio in London

Coordinates: 51°36′23″N 0°6′44″W

Southern Studios is a recording studio in the Wood Green area of London. It was founded in 1974 by John Loder, and came to be the recording studio of choice for Crass and their record label Crass Records. Southern Studios Ltd. continues to grow its label and provide label management and distribution services throughout Europe.

== Background ==
In the 1980s and 90s, Southern Studios Ltd. (SSL) started a record label and a distribution company. The label used the name Southern Records. The distributor uses the name Southern Record Distributors Ltd. (SRD) and took over UK distribution. The distributor is now independently owned.

SSL continued to serve the needs of Europe, as well as signing and supporting artists on the Southern Records.

During the massive growth of the independent music industry in the mid-1990s, Loder decided to establish Southern Records Inc. (SRI) in Chicago, which added artists to the roster and operates a distribution business for labels in the US and elsewhere.

== Technical details ==
Steve Albini, a long-time friend and associate of John Loder, has described the set up at Southern Studios as being completely analog. Although not entirely analogue, the vintage Raindirk Series III 24-channel desk dominates the studio control room. The studio retained two key time-based signal processors: an EMT 140 plate reverb and an AMS RSX-16 digital reverb. The studio today is owned by Southern Records and continues to operate under the guidance of sound engineer Harvey Birrell.

== Artists ==
The following is an incomplete list of artists who have recorded at Southern Studios:

- And Also The Trees
- The Jesus and Mary Chain
- Carter USM
- Chelsea Wolfe
- Crass
- Therapy?
- My Life with the Thrill Kill Kult
- Sonic Youth
- Neil Leyton
- Mark Stewart & The Maffia
- African Head Charge
- Big Black
- Lee Perry
- Shellac
- Fugazi
- All About Eve
- Grails
- Shit and Shine
- Lungleg
- Danielle Howle
- Babes in Toyland
- Bauhaus
- The Fall
- Ministry
- No Age
- Dananananaykroyd
- Pulp
- The Flaming Lips

== Distribution ==
The following is an incomplete list of record labels that have been manufactured & distributed or distributed by Southern Studios in Europe between 1978 and the present.

- Adult Swim Records
- Bluurg Records
- Constellation Records
- Coptic Cat
- Corpus Christi Records
- Crass Records
- Dischord Records
- Durtro Jnana
- Ipecac Records
- Kranky
- Neurot
- Outer Himalayan Records
- Southern Lord
- Spiderleg Records
- Touch & Go Records
- Trance Syndicate Records
- Upset the Rhythm
- Wrong Records

== See also ==
- Southern Records
- List of record labels
