= Steve Ignorant =

British singer and artist

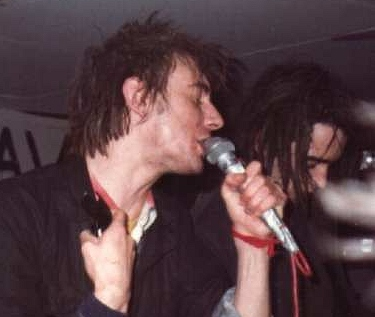
- Steve Ignorant with Crass, December 1981

Background information
- Also known as: Stephen Intelligent, Professor Ignorant
- Born: Steven Williams; 1957 (age 67–68); Stoke-on-Trent, England
- Genres: Anarcho-punk; punk rock
- Occupation: Singer
- Instrument: Vocals
- Years active: 1977–present
- Labels: Crass, Small Wonder
- Website: steveignorant.com

Steve Ignorant (born Steven Williams in 1957) is a singer and artist.

== Personal life ==
Steve Ignorant was born in Stoke-on-Trent but grew up in Dagenham, East London. He later lived at Dial House, which since 1967 has been a self-sustaining anarchist-pacifist intentional community in Epping Forest, Essex; it was here where he met Penny Rimbaud, one of the founders of the Dial House project.

He moved to the Norfolk coast in 2007 where he volunteers as a lifeboatman in Sea Palling.

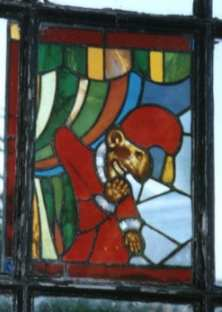
A stained glass image of Mr Punch by Steve Ignorant displayed at Dial House, Essex

He is a sculptor as well as a musician, and has worked as a traditional Punch and Judy performer using the name Professor Ignorant. In recent years he has developed an interest in the history of traditional London music hall performance. Ignorant is vegetarian.

== Musical career ==
=== Crass ===
Ignorant and Rimbaud co-founded the anarcho-punk band Crass in 1977. After Crass stopped performing in 1984, he worked with other groups including Conflict, Schwartzeneggar, Stratford Mercenaries, and Current 93 as well as being an occasional solo performer.

On 24 and 25 November 2007 he performed Crass's entire The Feeding of the 5000 live at the Shepherd's Bush Empire, backed by guest musicians. Other members of Crass were not involved in these concerts. "I acknowledge and respect Steve's right to do this", Rimbaud said, "but I do regard it as a betrayal of the Crass ethos". Ignorant had a different view; "I don't have to justify what I do. (...) Plus, most of the lyrics are still relevant today. And remember that three-letter word, 'fun'?"

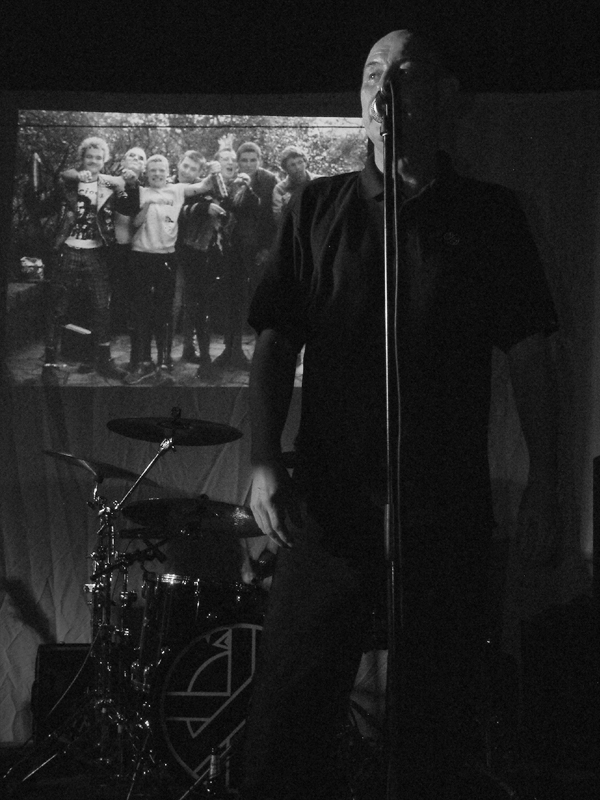
Ignorant at Cafe ExZess, Frankfurt, 17 October 2010

In 2010 Ignorant announced plans to do a tour called "The Last Supper", performing Crass songs from the period 1977–1982 with largely the same band that performed with him at Shepherd's Bush, including Gizz Butt, Bob Butler and Spike Smith. In August 2010 Ignorant and Rimbaud took to the stage together to be interviewed by John Robb on the literacy stage at the Rebellion Festival in Blackpool where they informed the large crowd that Rimbaud has now given him his blessing to perform Crass material live. In the same year Southern Records published The Rest Is Propaganda, Ignorant's autobiography co-written with Steve Pottinger. On 19 November 2011, Ignorant performed "The Last Supper" at the Shepherd's Bush Empire where he was joined on stage by Rimbaud and Eve Libertine. This was the last time Crass songs were performed live by him until his 2020 tour. In 2019, Ignorant announced plans to tour England in 2020 with a full band performing an all-Crass set.

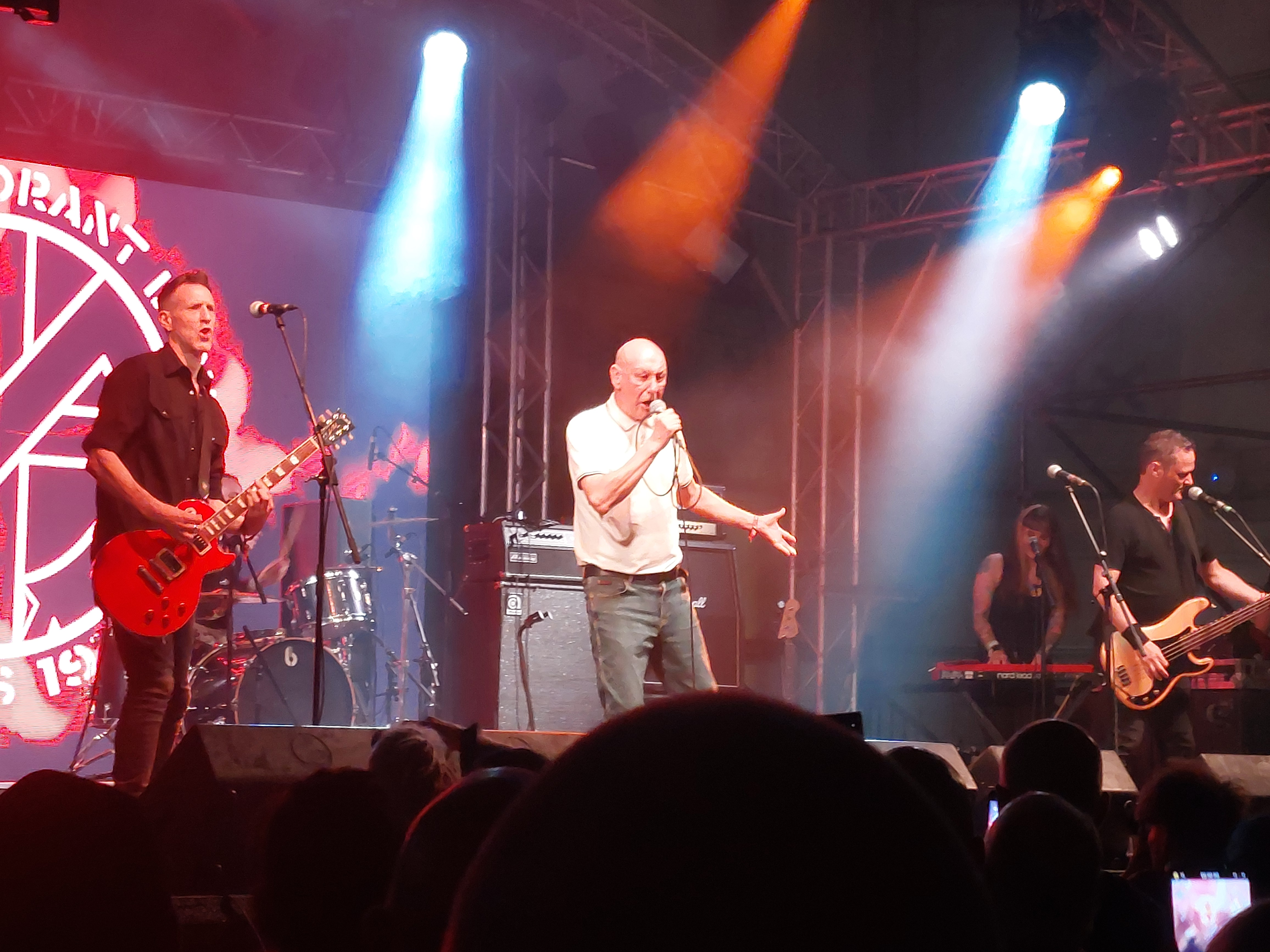
"Steve Ignorant Band Crass Set" at Rebellion Festival 2024

=== Slice of Life ===
While stranded in Sydney, Australia after a tour, Steve Ignorant, Carol Hodge and Pete Wilson came up with an idea for a new band, a more contemplative band backed by acoustic instruments. Thus Slice of Life was born. They performed for the first time at Wellingborough, UK on 25 October 2013. Lucas Martin joined the band on upright bass in 2015. Music publisher Wipeout Music says of the group, "Steve opens both heart and soul when reflecting on life and then reminds us just why we should never give up on this world or on each other with his poems and songs that make us think about the world around us and reminds us just why we should still care."

In March 2022 Steve Ignorant's Slice of Life released an EP called The Kids Was Just Crass via the Stay Free Recordings label. It contains David Bowie cover versions.

The band has recorded several albums.

1. Love and a Lamp Post (2014)
2. Live at the Forum 2015 (2016)
3. Don't Turn Away (2019)
4. Live at Ramsgate Music Hall (2020)

They also released an extended single, Just Another, in 2017.
