= Crass Records =

British record label

- Founded: 1979
- Founder: Crass
- Distributor(s): Southern Records
- Genre: Anarcho-punk, Punk rock
- Country of origin: United Kingdom
- Location: Essex

Crass Records was an independent record label that was set up by the anarchist punk band Crass.

== Overview and history ==
Prior to the formation of Crass, Penny Rimbaud and Gee Vaucher had published their creative works via their own Dial House based Exitstencil Press. However the band set up the record label after encountering problems over the release of their first 12" EP, The Feeding of the 5000, on the Small Wonder label in 1978. Workers at the Irish pressing plant contracted to manufacture the disc refused to handle it due to the allegedly blasphemous content of one song, "Asylum". The record was eventually released with this track removed and replaced by two minutes of silence, wryly retitled "The Sound Of Free Speech". However, this incident prompted Crass to set up their own record label to control all aspects of their future productions. Using money from a small inheritance that had been left to one of the band, the piece was shortly afterwards re-recorded and released as a 7" single using its full title, "Reality Asylum". A later repress of The Feeding of the 5000 on Crass Records restored the missing track.

Sleeve of "You Can Be You" by Honey Bane, sleeve designed by Gee Vaucher

As well as releasing their own material, Crass were able to use Crass Records to make available recordings by other performers, the first of which was the 1980 single "You Can Be You" by Honey Bane, a teenage girl who at the time was staying at Dial House whilst on the run from a children's home (however, Bane's backing band on this release are in fact Crass, using the name Donna and the Kebabs). Others who recorded for the label included Zounds, Flux of Pink Indians, Captain Sensible, the Cravats, Conflict, Icelandic band Kukl (who included singer Björk), classical singer Jane Gregory and the Poison Girls, a like-minded band who worked closely with Crass for several years. Many of these groups, in turn, went on to set up their own independent record labels loosely following the Crass Records model.

Sleeve of "Angry Songs" by Omega Tribe, sleeve designed by Gee Vaucher and Omega Tribe

Singles released on the Crass Records label had a distinctive 'corporate identity'. As well as lyrically addressing political themes from a broadly anarchist perspective, they were always low priced and usually produced by Crass drummer Penny Rimbaud and engineered by John Loder at Southern Studios in north London. They also featured sleeves designed by Gee Vaucher, often in conjunction with other artists, wherein the record's title and band name were set in 'stencil' style text in a black ring reminiscent of Robert Indiana and Jasper Johns' works. These sleeves usually folded out into large posters containing additional artwork and text.

The label also put out three editions of Bullshit Detector, compilations of demos and rough recordings that had been sent to the band which they felt represented the DIY punk ethic.

The catalogue numbers of Crass Records releases were intended to represent a countdown to the year 1984 (e.g., 521984 meaning "five years until 1984"), both the year that Crass stated that they would split up, and a date charged with significance in the anti-authoritarian calendar due to George Orwell's novel Nineteen Eighty-Four.

Although these vinyl records are now no longer pressed and their art out of print, many of the tracks have been collected and re-released on the A-Sides parts one and two compilation CDs. Crass' back catalogue, however, remains in print, both in vinyl and CD format.

Ex-Crass members Penny Rimbaud and Gee Vaucher continue to put out their creative works (for example, material by Last Amendment, and Vaucher's book Animal Rites) through Exitstencil, often in collaboration with other publishers such as the jazz label Babel Label and AK Press.

== Corpus Christi ==
Corpus Christi Records was a 'spin-off' from Crass Records, that enabled artists and performers to put out material supported by Crass through John Loder's Southern Studios, whilst not necessarily being tied to the latter label's 'corporate image' or anarchist ideology.

== Discography ==
=== Albums ===
- 621984 Crass - The Feeding Of The 5000
- 521984 Crass - Stations of the Crass
- 421984/2 Poison Girls - Chappaquiddick Bridge
- 421984/4 V/A - Bullshit Detector
- 421984/9 Poison Girls - Hex
- 321984/1 Crass - Penis Envy
- Bollox2u2 Crass - Christ: The Album
- 221984/3 V/A - Bullshit Detector Vol 2
- 221984/7 Dirt - Never Mind Dirt, Here's the Bollocks
- 121984/2 Crass - Yes Sir, I Will
- 1984/1 Kukl - The Eye
- 1984/207370 Hit Parade - Plastic Culture
- 1984/3 V/A - Bullshit Detector Vol 3
- 1984/4 Penny Rimbaud - Acts of Love
- CATNO 1 D & V - D & V
- CATNO 4 Kukl - Holidays in Europe
- CATNO 5 Crass - Best Before
- CATNO 7 Hit Parade - Nick Knack Paddy Whack
- CATNO 8 Crass - A Sides Part One, 1979-1982
- CATNO 9 Crass - A Sides Part Two, 1982-1984
- CATNO 10C Crass - Christ's Reality Asylum

=== Singles ===
- CRASS1 Crass - "Reality Asylum" / "Shaved Women" 7"
- 521984/1 Honey Bane - "You Can Be You" / "Girl on the Run" / "Porno Grows" / "Boring Conversation" 7"
- 421984/1 Crass / "Poison Girls - Bloody Revolutions" / "Persons Unknown" 7"
- 421984/3 Zounds - "Can't Cheat Karma" / "War" / "Subvert.Subvert.Subvert.Subvert." 7"
- 421984/5 Crass - "Nagasaki Nightmare" / "Big A Little A" 7"
- 421984/6 Crass - "Rival Tribal Rebel Revel" 7" (Flexi-disc free with "Toxic Grafity" fanzine)
- 421984/7 Poison Girls - "Statement" 7" Flexi-disc
- 421984/8 Poison Girls - "All Systems Go" / "Dirty Work" / "Promenade Immortelle" 7"
- 321984/1F Crass - "Our Wedding" 7" (Flexi-disc got with a coupon from "Loving" magazine)
- 321984/2 Flux Of Pink Indians - "Neu Smell" 7"
- 321984/3 Annie Anxiety - "Barbed Wire Halo" 7"
- 321984/4 Snipers - "Three Peace Suite" 7"
- 321984/5 Captain Sensible - "This Is Your Captain Speaking" 7"
- 321984/6 Dirt - "Object Refuse Reject Abuse" 7"
- 321984/7 Mob - "No Doves Fly Here" 7"
- CT1 Crass - "Merry Crassmass" 7"
- 221984/1 Conflict - "The House That Man Built" 7"
- 221984/2 Rudimentary Peni - "Farce" 7"
- 221984/4 Cravats - "Rub Me Out" 7"
- 221984/5 T, Andy - "Weary of the Flesh" 7"
- No number Crass - "Sheep Farming In the Falklands" 7" (Initially released as flexi, later as 121984/3)
- 221984/6 Crass - "How Does It Feel?" / "The Immortal Death" / "Don't Tell Me You Care" 7"
- 221984/8 Alternative - "In Nomine Patri" 7"
- 221984/9 Anthrax - "Capitalism Is Cannibalism" 7"
- 221984/10 Omega Tribe - "Angry Songs" 7"
- 221984/11 Sleeping Dogs - "Beware Sleeping Dogs" 7"
- 221984/12 Hit Parade - "Bad News" 7"
- 121984/1 D & V - "The Nearest Door" 7"
- 121984/3 Crass - "Sheep Farming In the Falklands" 7" (Formerly flexi-disc only)
- 121984/4 Crass - "Whodunnit?" 7"
- 121984/5 MDC - "Multi-Death Corporations" 7"
- 121984/6 "Lack Of Knowledge Grey" 7"
- 1984 Crass - "You're Already Dead" 7"
- CATNO 2 Jane Gregory - "Do Not Go" 7"
- CATNO 3 Lucky 7 - "Take Your Elbows Off the Table" (Choral Mix) / "Take Your Elbows Off the Table" (Orchestral Mix) 7" (Actually Steve Ignorant - unreleased, test pressings only)
- CATNO 6 Crass - "10 Notes On A Summer's Day" 12"

== See also ==
- Crass
- Crass Records discography
- Southern Records
