= Penny Rimbaud =

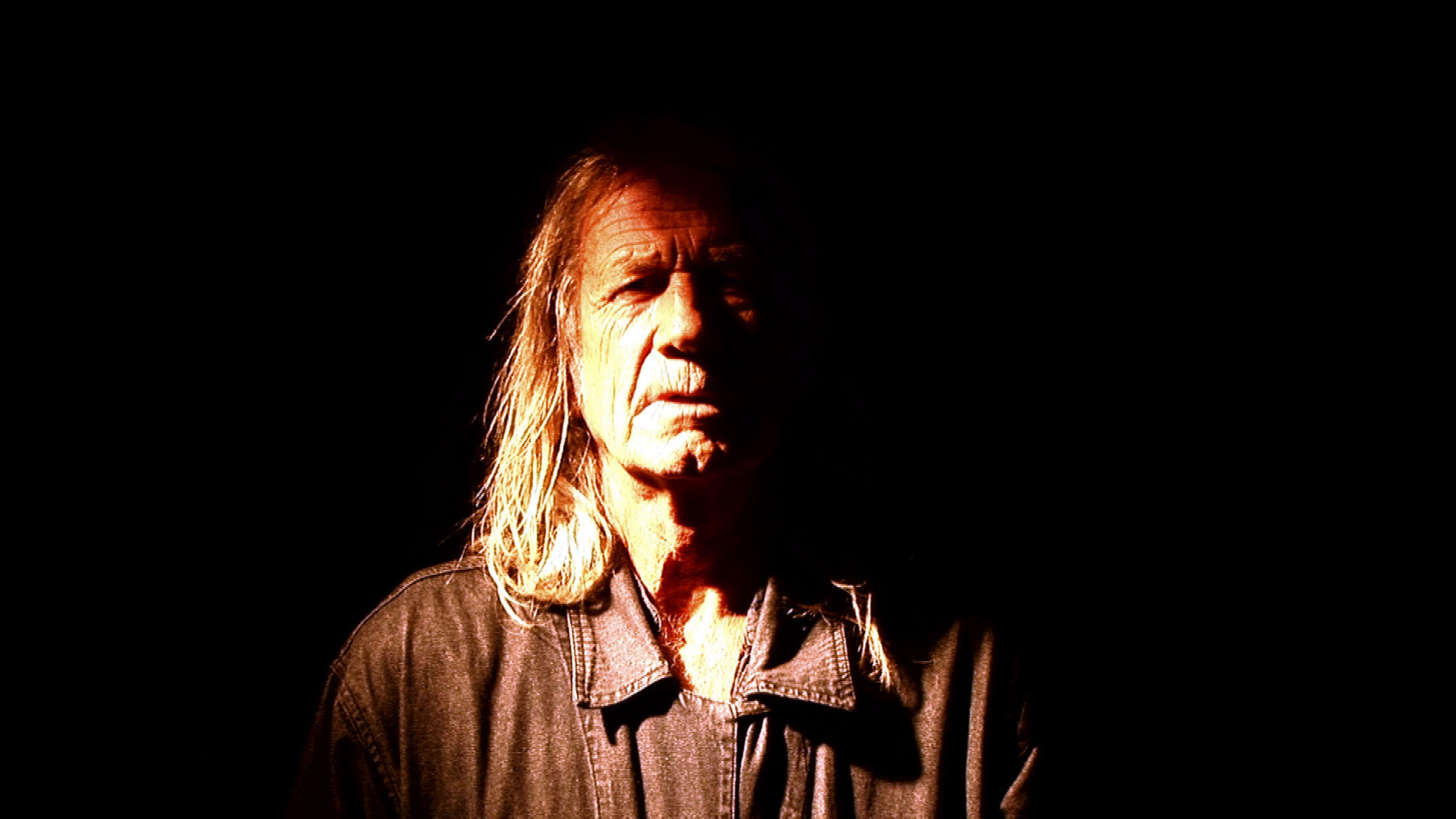
- Penny Rimbaud in Girlfriend in a Kimono, (2005)

Background information
- Born: Jeremy John Ratter; 8 June 1943 (age 83); Northwood, Middlesex, United Kingdom
- Genres: Anarcho-punk, spoken word
- Occupations: Writer, poet, philosopher, performance artist, musician
- Instruments: Drums, vocals
- Years active: 1960s–present
- Labels: Small Wonder, Crass, Exitstencilisms
- Website: web.archive.org/web/20220122172914/http://onoffyesno.com/ (archived)

Penny Lapsang Rimbaud (born Jeremy John Ratter, 8 June 1943) is a writer, poet, philosopher, painter, musician and activist. He was a member of the performance art groups EXIT and Ceres Confusion, and in 1972 was co-founder of the Stonehenge Free Festival, together with Phil Russell aka Wally Hope. In 1977 with Steve Ignorant, he co-founded the seminal anarchist punk band Crass and served as its drummer. Crass disbanded in 1984. Until 2000 Rimbaud devoted himself almost entirely to writing, returning to the public platform in 2001 as a performance poet working with Australian saxophonist Louise Elliott and a wide variety of jazz musicians under the umbrella of Last Amendment.

== Name ==
Ratter claims to have changed his name by deed poll in 1977, as, in his own words, he "wanted to be his own child". The surname was taken from that of the French symbolist poet Arthur Rimbaud; the forename was chosen because Rimbaud's brother Anthony would refer to him as "a toilet-seat philosopher" (a penny being the price to enter public toilets in those days).

== Early life ==
Rimbaud was expelled from two public schools: Brentwood School in South East England and Lindisfarne College in North Wales. In early interviews, he claimed to have studied philosophy at Magdalen College, Oxford, but later claimed that this story had been fabricated "so that they couldn’t disclaim my role as an intellectual."

== Artistic life ==
In 1964, Rimbaud appeared on TV's Ready Steady Go! to receive a prize from John Lennon after having won a competition to produce artwork depicting the Beatles' song "I Want to Hold Your Hand." Rimbaud worked briefly as an art teacher before becoming disillusioned with education, and then spent some time working as a coalman.

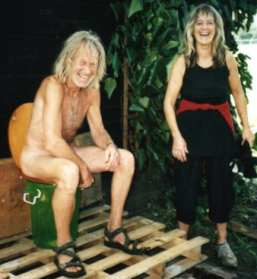
Penny Rimbaud (on a composting toilet) and Gee Vaucher, 2002

In 1967, inspired by the film Inn of the Sixth Happiness, Rimbaud and Gee Vaucher, both vegetarians, set up the anarchist/pacifist open house Dial House in the Epping Forest of southwest Essex, which has now become firmly established as a "centre for radical creativity."

=== Crass ===
At Dial House in the early 1970s, Rimbaud co-founded the Stonehenge Festival along with Phil Russell, better known as Wally Hope.

Crass Records released Acts of Love, an album of Rimbaud's poems set to classical music in 1985. A book of Gee Vaucher paintings accompanied the release.

=== Written works ===
Rimbaud's written works include the originally self-published Reality Asylum, a vitriolic attack on Christianity that appeared in heavily revised form on Crass' 1978 debut album The Feeding of the 5000, as a longer single and as a 45-minute spoken-word monologue. Other writings include: Rocky Eyed, an extended poem attacking prime minister Margaret Thatcher and her government following the 1982 Falklands War, which was recorded as the Crass album Yes Sir, I Will; The Death of Imagination (a "musical drama in 4 parts"); and The Diamond Signature (published by AK Press). Oh America is a response to the September 11, 2001 attacks and the United States' subsequent war on terror. It includes the line, "Give us justice which is not the searing spite of revenge, peace which is not the product of war nor dependent upon it."

== Current work ==
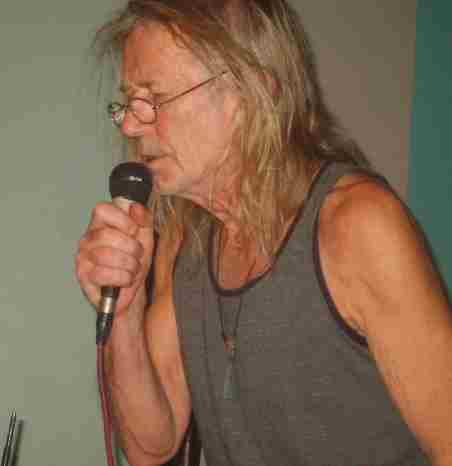
Penny Rimbaud performing with Last Amendment at The Vortex, Hackney, 30 November 2006

Rimbaud contributed several spoken-word tracks to the 2008 Japanther album Tut Tut Now Shake Ya Butt and spoken-word vocals for the Charlatans track "I Sing the Body Eclectic" on the album Who We Touch.

== Bibliography ==
- A Series of Shock Slogans and Mindless Token Tantrums (Exitstencil Press, 1982) (originally issued as a pamphlet with the LP Christ - The Album)
- Shibboleth: My Revolting Life (Penny Rimbaud, 1999, AK Press)
- The Diamond Signature (Penny Rimbaud, 1999, AK Press)
- An extensive interview with Rimbaud appears in issue 29 of The Idler magazine
- In The Beginning…Was the Word (Penny Rimbaud, 2005, Bracketpress)
- Freedom Is Such a Big Word (Penny Rimbaud, 2006, Bracketpress)
- Methinks (Penny Rimbaud, 2006, Bracketpress)
- How? (Penny Rimbaud, 2006, Bracketpress)
- The Conveniences of Philosophy (Penny Rimbaud, 2007, Bracketpress)
- Smile or Smirk? (Penny Rimbaud, 2007, Bracketpress)
- And Now It Rains (Penny Rimbaud, 2007, Bracketpress)
- I the Indigene & Africa Seems So Far Away (Penny Rimbaud, 2007, Bracketpress)
- Turn On, Tune In, Cop Out (Penny Rimbaud, 2008, Bracketpress)
- Nobody's Child (Penny Rimbaud, 2008, Bracketpress)
- The Last of the Hippies (Penny Rimbaud, 2008, Active Distribution)
- This Crippled Flesh – A Book of Philosophy and Filth (Penny Rimbaud, 2010, Bracketpress/Exitstencil Press)
- Particular Nonsense (essay) The Idler, No.43 'Back to the Land' May 2010

== Discography ==
See also Crass discography. Rimbaud plays on all Crass albums and singles.

- Christ's Reality Asylum (Crass Records, 1992)
- The Death of Imagination – Musical drama (Red Herring Records, 1995, featuring Eve Libertine, with vocals by anti-humanist artist A-Soma and music by A-Soma and Sarah Barton.)
- Savage Utopia (Babel Label, 2004, performed by Crass Agenda)
- How? (Babel Label, 2004 – Rimbaud's interpretation of Ginsberg's Howl)
- In the Beginning Was the WORD – Live DVD recorded in 2004 at the Progress Bar in London, performed by Crass Agenda
- Tut, Tut, Now Shake Ya Butt with Brooklyn-based duo Japanther (Truth Cult, 2007)
- Acts of Love – fifty poems set to music, featuring Eve Libertine, recorded 1984 (Existstencilism, 2012)
- Kernschmelze (Concerto For Improvised Piano) - Penny Rimbaud (Exitstencil Press, 2015)
- What Passing Bells (The War Poems of Wilfred Owen) - Penny Rimbaud (One Little Indian, 2018)
- War & Peace - Penny Rimbaud (One Little Independent Records, 2019)
- Christ's Reality Asylum - Penny Rimbaud, Eve Libertine, Hugh Metcalfe (One Little Independent Records, 2020)
- How? - Penny Rimbaud (One Little Independent Records, 2020)
- Arthur Rimbaud in Verdun - Penny Rimbaud (One Little Independent Records, 2020)
- You Stare - Penny Rimbaud, Eve Libertine, Marko Vojnić (Do It With Others Records, 2021)
- Corpus Mei - Penny Rimbaud & Youth (One Little Independent Records, 2021)
- Kernschmelze III - Penny Rimbaud & Kate Shortt (Caliban Records, 2022)
- S LENCE - Peter Vukmirovic Stevens & Penny Rimbaud (One Little Independent avant-garde subsidiary Caliban Sounds, 2022)
- You Stare - Marko Vojnić, Penny Rimbaud, Eve Libertine - Mikado Koko Generative Cut-up (Do It With Others Records, 2023)

== Filmography ==
- Girlfriend in a Kimono – as Rimbaud in Dominic Thackray's anti-romance, 2005.
- For These Who Die As Cattle – A recital of Wilfred Owen's War Poetry, with jazz cellist Kate Short, and pianist, Liam Noble, filmed at King's College Chapel 2016.
- How – A reinterpretation of Allen Ginsberg's classic 1954 poem 'Howl' with cellist Kate Short - filmed at London's Abney Park Chapel in Summer 2017.
- Time and Place – A lockdown movie originally shown Rebellion 2020 Online Festival. Final cut to be released in 2021, filmed by Skype.
