= Gee Vaucher =

British visual artist

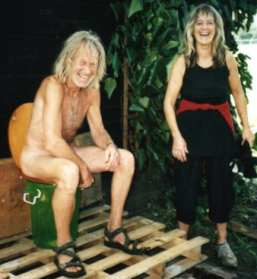
- Penny Rimbaud and Gee Vaucher photographed by Graham Burnett, 2002
- Born: 1945 (age 80–81); Dagenham, Essex, England
- Movement: Anarchism and protest-art

Gee Vaucher (born Carole Vaucher in 1945 in Dagenham, Essex, England) is a visual artist primarily associated with the anarcho-punk band Crass.

== Biography ==
Vaucher met her long-time creative partner Penny Rimbaud in the early 1960s when both were attending the South-East Essex Technical College and School of Art. The name 'Gee' derives from 'Grout', Rimbaud having responded to something Vaucher was complaining about with 'stop grouting' (rather than 'stop grousing'); "I said, 'you mean grousing'. Anyway, the Grout name stuck and everyone started calling me Grout, and then it gradually got shortened to Gee."

In 1967, inspired by the film Inn of the Sixth Happiness, they set up the anarchist/pacifist open house Dial House in Essex, UK, which has now become firmly established as a 'centre for radical creativity'.

In 2016, Vaucher was awarded an honorary doctorate from the University of Essex.

Vaucher is vegetarian.

== Works ==
Her work with anarcho-punk band Crass was seminal to the 'protest art' of the 1980s. Vaucher has always seen her work as a tool for social change, and has expressed her strong anarcho-pacifist and feminist views in her paintings and collages. Vaucher also uses surrealist styles and methods.

She continues to design sleeves for Babel Label, and also designed the sleeve for The Charlatans' Who We Touch album. Vaucher has exhibited at the 96 Gillespie gallery in London. In 2007 and 2008, the Jack Hanley Gallery in San Francisco and Track 16 in Santa Monica ran exhibitions titled "Gee Vaucher: Introspective", showing a wide selection of Vaucher's work.

On the day after Donald Trump's election victory in November 2016, the British Daily Mirror newspaper featured Vaucher's 1989 painting Oh America on its front page.

=== Published collections ===
In the foreword to her first book, a 1999 retrospective collection entitled Crass Art and Other Pre Post-Modernist Monsters, Ian Dury writes:

"In its original form, Gee's work is intricate and tactile, and while the imagery is sometimes almost overwhelming, the primary concerns are those of a painter; dealing with form and space. Mere newsprint would hardly do justice to its subtle tones. When the work is printed, the space becomes more simple and the graphic images take on a different life. The concerns are those of delivery, and the message is clear."

In her second book, Animal Rites: a pictorial study of relationships, she gives a commentary on the relationship between animals and humans, centered on the quote "All humans are animals, but some animals are more human than others."

=== Film ===
Vaucher's film Gower Boy, made in collaboration with pianist Huw Warren, debuted at the 14th Raindance Film Festival in London in October 2006.

== See also ==
- Dial House, Essex
- Anarchism in the arts

== Bibliography ==
- Crass Art and Other Pre Post-Modernist Monsters - A collection of work by Gee Vaucher (AK Press 1999)
- Animal Rites: a pictorial study of relationships (Exitstencil Books, 2004)
