= Omega Tribe (British band) =

English anarcho-punk band

- Also known as: The Tribe
- Origin: Barnet, London, England
- Genres: Anarcho-punk, post-punk
- Years active: 1981–1988, 1995, 2016–present
- Labels: Crass Records; Corpus Christi Records
- Formerly of: Poison Girls, Rubella Ballet, Fatal Microbes
- Members: Hugh Vivian, Emma Page, Rav Dano

Omega Tribe are an English anarcho-punk band, formed in Barnet, London in 1981. Their first run came to an end in 1988, the band had released one LP and two EPs. They briefly reformed in 1995 and from 2016 the band has been active again. Hugh Vivian is the only original member after fellow founder Daryl Hardcastle passed in 2024.

== History ==
The band formed in 1981 with the original three members living in Barnet. They went to the same together. The roles in the band were Hugh Vivian on guitar and vocals, Daryl Hardcastle on bass and Pete Shepherd on drums. They were fans of Crass and Poison Girls. Pete Fender, who had played with Poison Girls (and other bands), soon joined the band on guitar. Their first EP, Angry Songs, was produced by Penny Rimbaud and Fender for Crass Records in 1982.

Their subsequent LP, No Love Lost, (released by Corpus Christi Records, 1983) won the hearts of many hardened anarcho-punks and secured their place in the genre's history. A far more melodic style, encouraged by producer and their guitarist Fender, created a highly influential template that many other bands were to build on.

In 1983, the band released a recording from concert in Bradford. Called Live (reissued as Peace), it was cassette only and published by BBP Records.

In 1984, Sonny Flint joined on drums, and they took on a sax and flute player Jane Keay. Pete Shepherd the original drummer switched to playing additional percussion.

Fender departed early in 1984. Line-up changes were fairly frequent after this period and a 12" EP, "(It's a) Hard Life"/"Young John", was finally released in 1985 that showed a complete change of direction.

By 1986, after the departure of vocalist and founder-member Hugh, the band was known simply as The Tribe. The band continued to maintain a presence on the UK live circuit for a further year or so but recording opportunity evaded them. Sonny Flint departed in 1987 and the band split in 1988.

=== Post breakup ===
Omega Tribe reformed briefly to play guest spot at Vi Subversa's 60th Birthday Bash at London's Astoria 2 in June 1995. A short incognito tour under the name of Charlie showed promise, but the band's members had other interests and the project was short-lived.

A compilation CD, Make Tea Not War, was released in 2000 on Rugger Bugger Records and a cut-down vinyl LP version was also pressed. Both albums quickly sold out.

=== Reformation ===
In August 2016, Daryl Hardcastle and Sonny Flint asked Hugh Vivian if he would like to restart the band. They reunited and performed a limited number of dates between December 2016 and March 2017. They played Vi Day at the 2017 AWOD Festival. At the end of March 2017, Sonny Flint left the band.

By 2022, Emma Page had joined the band as drummer. In the same year, the band released New Peace Movement. Louder Than War described the band as more melodic than a lot of anarcho-punk peers. Saying that the band had a broad sound that in places reminded them of Chumbawamba.

In February 2024, founding member Daryl Hardcastle died after a short period of illness. The songwriter, singer and bassist was 59 years old. By March, the band had decided to carry on, saying it is what Hardcastle would have wanted. Rav Dano joined the band on bass.

The band's second LP, Power Pop Punk Rock, came out in June 2025 on Grow Your Own Records.

== Legacy ==
In 2017, Louder than War described them as anarcho-punk legends. Saying they had wider range of influences than many bands in the genre and describing the music as having a 'very human heart'.

== Discography ==
- Angry Songs EP (Crass Records 1982)
- No Love Lost LP (Corpus Christi Records 1983)
- Live CASSETTE (BBP Records, 1983, reissued as Peace)
- It's a Hard Life 12" EP (Corpus Christi Records 1985)
- Out Of My System EP (Grow Your Own Records 2020)
- New Peace Movement (Grow Your Own Records 2022)
- Hope Is A Moral Imperative EP (Grow Your Own Records 2023)
- Power Pop Punk Rock LP (Grown Your Own Records 2025)

=== Compilations ===
- Make Tea Not War CD/LP (Rugger Bugger Records 2000)

=== Compilation appearances ===
- Bullshit Detector, Volume 2 (Crass Records 1982)
