= Hex (Poison Girls album) =

Studio album by Poison Girls
- Released: 1979
- Recorded: April 1979
- Studio: Southern Studios, London N22
- Genre: Anarcho-punk
- Length: 26:41
- Label: Small Wonder, Xntrix Records
- Producer: Penny Rimbaud

Poison Girls chronology
Hex (1979)	Chappaquiddick Bridge (1980)

Professional ratings
Review scores
Source	Rating
AllMusic	2/5 stars

Hex is the debut EP by English anarcho-punk band Poison Girls, co-released in 1979 by Small Wonder and Xntrix Records. In a 2016 retrospective article following the death of Vi Subversa, The Independent considered the album "essentially one song". Trouser Press found the album to make "no grand statements" but liked "the guitar-based music".

== Track listing ==
Words and music by the Poison Girls

1. "Old Tarts Song"– 2:21
2. "Crisis"– 3:26
3. "Idealogically Unsound"– 2:40
4. "Bremen Song"– 7:15
5. "Political Love"– 2:31
6. "Jump Mama Jump"– 3:03
7. "Under the Doctor"– 2:49
8. "Reality Attack"– 5:25

== Personnel ==
Poison Girls

- Vi Subversa - guitar, vocals
- Richard Famous - guitar, vocals
- Bernhardt Rebours - bass
- Lance D'Boyle - drums

with:

- Eve Libertine - additional vocals

Technical

- John Loder - sound engineer
- Bernhardt Rebours - sleeve design
