= Where's the Pleasure? =

Studio album by Poison Girls
- Released: 1982
- Genre: Punk
- Label: Xntrix Records – XN2006
- Producer: Poison Girls, Simaen Skolfield, Stuart James

Poison Girls chronology
Chappaquiddick Bridge (1980)	Where's the Pleasure? (1982)	Songs of Praise (1985)

Professional ratings
Review scores
Source	Rating
AllMusic	3/5 stars

Where's the Pleasure? is the third studio album by UK band Poison Girls. It was released by Xntrix Records in 1982.

The album mostly moved away from the political topics of previous releases, focusing more on sexual matters.

== Critical reception ==
Trouser Press wrote: "Subversa’s weary, whisky-and-tobacco-stained voice is a husky but serviceable instrument that perfectly suits the material and lends a tragic, poetic air to the record."

== Track listing ==
All Tracks written by Poison Girls.

- Side A
1. Where's The Pleasure
2. Lovers Are They Worth It
3. I've Done It All Before
4. Whisky Voice
5. Ménage Abattoir
6. Take The Toys
7. Soft Touch
8. Take The Toys (Reprise)
- Side B
1. Velvet Launderette
2. Rio Disco Stink
3. Cry No More
4. Mandy Is Having A Baby
5. Fear Of Freedom

== Personnel ==
- Vi Subversa - vocals, guitar
