= Al Gregg =

English actor, screenwriter and musician (1963–2026)

- Born: 9 June 1963; West Brompton, London, England
- Died: May 2026 (aged 62)
- Occupations: Actor, screenwriter, musician

Al Gregg (9 June 1963 – May 2026) was an English actor, screenwriter and musician.

== Life and career ==
After leaving school at 16 he played guitar and sang in various punk bands including Three Minute Warning/Four Minds Crack, who are featured in Ian Glasper's 'A Country Fit For Heroes: DIY Punk in Eighties Britain' Vol II and were managed/produced by Rab Fae Beith The Wall punk band and Dave Parsons Sham 69. Al then joined The Wall, (who had been produced by Steve Jones of the Sex Pistols, Jimmy Pursey Sham 69), Pete Wilson and Dennis Munday Sham 69/The Jam and appeared in music magazines like Melody Maker, and recorded on the Wall's Day Tripper 12" and EP, recorded at the Crass Southern Studios in 1982. Recently the Wall have reformed and appeared at the Rebellion Festival punk festival in Blackpool and on UK tours.

After the band's split in 1983, he trained as an actor at the Rose Bruford College of Speech and Drama (1985–88); The Oxford School of Drama (1984/87); and was in two RADA productions; 'Worthless Thing'- Etcetera/Watford Palace Theatre 1999-2000; 'The Zoo Story' - Gielgud Theatre RADA 2004. His many television credits include EastEnders, Casualty, Conquest, Van Der Valk, The Bill, Soldier Soldier, Inspector Alleyn and Lovejoy. He has recently appeared in the films The Real American: Joe McCarthy; Operation Chastity; The Final; Dead Ideas; A Modest Proposal. Most recently Harrigan; Dr Easy; Squat; Write the Future, starring Wayne Rooney and directed by Alejandro González Iñárritu, has appeared in Fuelling the Future for the London Olympics/Paralympics 2012.

Al has voiced film trailers, video games and was a brand voice for many companies.

Gregg was the lead guitarist for rock singer Caroline Alexander (Organic/Universal) produced by Ace (Skunk Anansie) and also for Rip It Up (Ankh Music). He frequently appeared live, including headlining The Forum (2006) and supporting Girlschool at the London Astoria (2005). In 2007 and then 2016, Al re-appeared with the Wall at the 40th anniversary Rebellion Punk festival, at the Opera House, Winter Gardens, Blackpool, and also appeared with the band live on their UK tour, co headlining with Spizz Energi as well as recording new material. In February 2022 the four track 'Back to the Wall - Manchuria' EP by The Wall was released by Spectacle Music Ltd featuring two previously unreleased Wall songs written by Ian Lowery and two new songs written by Al Gregg, as a tribute to both Ian Lowery and Andy Griffiths. The EP received positive reviews from the likes of Louder than War and Phonotonal.

Al Gregg's novel The Wrong Outfit, about football and punk rock, published by AuthorHouse UK, was released in the autumn of 2010.

He co-wrote and composed the original music in the Punk play 'Reality Chokes', and appeared as one of the main characters Dan, both in London and at the Edinburgh Festival in 2009. His other writing includes two historical plays. He has also co-adapted with his brother Rob Gregg, Aristophanes' comedy 'Frogs Reimagined' as a play about music, for productions in Greece, Cyprus and at the Stockton Theatre, New Jersey in the US in 2014. Further musical co-adaptations of Shakespeare, Midsummer Night's Scream (performed at the Dante Hall Theatre, Atlantic City, US) in 2013. A further play with music about Syd Barrett of Pink Floyd and his alter ego Arnold Layne titled 'Piper' is due. He became the voice for the podcast animation series CodEye, written by Martin Kaluza and Martin Cooper with drawings by Luke Harkus-Jeffries.

On 12 May 2026, the official Facebook page for The Wall announced that Gregg had died the previous weekend, aged 62.

== Sources ==
- Gregg, Al (2010) The Wrong Outfit, AuthorHouse UK, ISBN 978-1-4520-0152-4
- Glasper, Ian (2004) Burning Britain: The History of UK Punk 1980–1984, Cherry Red Books, ISBN 1-901447-24-3
- Glasper, Ian (2025) A Country Fit For Heroes: DIY Punk in Eighties Britain, Earth Island Books, ISBN 9781916864245
