= Rubella (disambiguation) =

Rubella is an infection caused by rubella virus.

Rubella may also refer to:

- Rubella virus, the pathogenic agent of rubella
- Rubella vaccine, a vaccine against rubella
- Rubella Ballet, an English anarcho-punk band
