= Honey Bane =

English singer and actress

- Born: Donna Tracey Harrison; 1964 (age 61–62); London, England
- Genres: Anarcho punk, new wave
- Occupations: Musician, actress
- Instrument: Vocals
- Years active: 1978–present
- Labels: Crass Records, EMI/Zonophone
- Website: Official Website

Honey Bane (born Donna Tracy Harrison; 1964) is an English singer and actress, known for her 1981 UK Top 40 single "Turn Me On Turn Me Off".

== Early life and career ==
Honey Bane began her musical career at the age of 14 in 1978 when she formed the punk rock band the Fatal Microbes. The band released a split 12-inch record with anarcho-punk band Poison Girls the same year. The first single, "Violence Grows", garnered some press attention and was given positive reviews by the British music paper Sounds.

After the 1979 breakup of the Fatal Microbes, and a stint in a juvenile detention facility that garnered more press attention, Bane began a collaboration with Crass, while she was on the run from the Social Services after serving a sentence at the St. Charles Youth Treatment Centre in Essex. Lending lead vocals and backed by the band under the name Donna and the Kebabs, Crass released the EP You Can Be You in 1979. It was the debut release on Crass' newly founded label, Crass Records. The following year, Bane released her debut solo single, "Guilty", and sang vocals for Killing Joke on "What's the Matter" during a February 1980 gig at London's Venue club. The recording was later released on a bootleg album, Killing Joke - Live At The Venue LP.

In 1980, she met Sham 69 vocalist Jimmy Pursey, who began to manage her musical career. Later in the year, she toured as an opening act for UB40. That year she was signed to EMI/Zonophone records for a five-year recording contract.

In 1981, Bane began collaborating with her then manager, Jimmy Pursey. The collaboration resulted in a new single, "Turn Me On Turn Me Off", which peaked in the UK Singles Chart at No. 37, and Bane subsequently appeared performing the single on Top of the Pops. "Turn Me On Turn Me Off" marked a musical departure for Bane from punk rock to a new wave sound.

Bane would be teamed up with Alan Shacklock, Steve Levine and Nick Tauber, to work on several singles, released between 1981 and 1983. Only one more appeared in the UK Singles Chart ("Baby Love" – No. 58) and her musical career floundered, when Bane left her contract with EMI, frustrated with the direction her music was being forced in by her label.

In 1982, she appeared in the play Demonstration of Affection by Chris Ward opposite Richard Jobson of The Skids at London's Arts Theatre. In 1983, she gained a prominent role in the Mai Zetterling directed British film Scrubbers. Bane played the role of Molly and the film centred on the lives of young women incarcerated in a British girls' borstal. The film also featured actors Kathy Burke, Pam St. Clement, Robbie Coltrane and Miriam Margolyes.

Bane spent the remainder of the 1980s as a pin-up model for erotic magazines. During the 1990s, she fronted the band Dog's Tooth Violet. In 2006, she released the single, "Down Thing" / "Got Me All Wrong".

== Later career ==
In 2008, Bane appeared in a role in the Chris Ward written and directed short film, What Shall We Do with the Drunken Sailor, based on the life of artist/model Nina Hamnett, self-styled "Queen of Bohemia", starring Siobhan Fahey (ex-singer with Bananarama and Shakespears Sister), actor Clive Arrindel and Donny Tourette (frontman with punk band Towers of London).

In 2015, Bane released her first full studio album, Acceptance of Existence, which was over ten years in the making. She released it independently via her website, along with an Anthology CD titled, It's a Baneful Life... The Anthology 1978–2015, which features her complete works. Both titles were released on Bane's own label, You Can Be You Records.

In 2022, the label, One Little Independent (formerly, One Little Indian) reissued 12" pressings of classic Crass singles, which included Bane's You Can Be You EP. She performed poetry live at public events and continued to write music. The following year, Bane participated in Record Store Day UK, with an exclusive coloured 12 inch repressing of her Violence Grows single, which is released on 22 April 2023. The record is "bruised" black and blue and features new artwork and liner notes, including a message from Bane. The single is limited to 1500 copies.

AS of April 2023, Bane is currently planning a new album, but details are scarce at the time of writing.

== Discography ==
=== Singles ===
- 1978 - "Violence Grows" (12-inch split single)
- 1979 - "You Can Be You" (7-inch EP) UK Indie No. 3
- 1980 - "Guilty" (7-inch) UK Indie No. 9
- 1980 - "Baby Love" (7-inch) UK No. 58
- 1981 - "Turn Me On Turn Me Off" (7-inch) UK No. 37
- 1981 - "Negative Exposure" (7-inch)
- 1981 - "Jimmy... (Listen To Me)" (7-inch)
- 1982 - "Wish I Could Be Me" (7-inch and 12-inch)
- 1983 - "Dizzy Dreamers" (7-inch)
- 2006 - "Downthing" (CD)
- 2015 - "Violence Grew" (Digital Download)
- 2015 - "You Can Be You" (Celebratory CD Reissue)
- 2022 - "You Can Be You" (One Little Independent 12" Reissue)
- 2023 - "Violence Grows" (Record Store Day 12" Coloured Vinyl Exclusive)

=== Albums ===
- 2015 - It's a Baneful Life... The Anthology 1978–2015 (CD/Digital Download)
- 2015 - Acceptance of Existence (CD/Digital Download)
- 2023 - A Baneful Life (revised edition of ‘It’s A Baneful Life’) (CD/Digital Download)
