= Ski Patrol (band) =

- Origin: Brixton, London, England
- Genres: Post-punk
- Years active: 1979–1981
- Labels: Malicious Damage, Clever Metal
- Past members: Ian Lowery; Nick Clift; Peter Balmer; Bruce Archibald; Alan Cole; Francis Cook

Ski Patrol were a British post-punk band formed in London in 1979 by former The Wall and future Folk Devils singer Ian Lowery and Nick Clift of The Debutantes.

== History ==
Ski Patrol was formed in Brixton, London in the autumn of 1979 by members of two Sunderland, UK college bands, The Wall and The Debutantes. Founding members were singer Ian Lowery and guitarist Nick Clift. They took their band name from a song on John Cale's Slow Dazzle album. Inspired by the darkwave and punk-funk sounds and emotions of British post-punk bands like Joy Division, Gang Of Four, and A Certain Ratio, they were also influenced by the Jamaican rhythms and politically charged environment that was their new home. The band set about writing angular, moody songs that fused Lowery's dark lyrical pre-occupations with Clift's ringing, textured guitar chord phrasing. Joined by fellow North-Eastern transplants Peter Balmer (formerly of Stranded) on bass and drummer Bruce Archibald (the original drummer in The Wall), the band began playing shows on the London live circuit opening for The Carpettes. By December, they had recorded four songs at Alaska Studios in Waterloo, two of which became their first singles. "Everything Is Temporary" b/w "Silent Scream" was released in February 1980 on their own Clever Metal label with help from Rough Trade Records, and reached no. 44 on the UK Independent Singles Chart. Features in fanzines including Allied Propaganda, Mick Mercer's Panache, ZigZag and No Class followed. They quickly gained a regular audience at venues like The Rock Garden in the West End and The Moonlight Club in West Hampstead.

In early 1980, Archibald quit the band and was replaced by Alan Cole. More shows followed, and the band came to the attention of Malicious Damage, a label and management operation in West London that had already released music by Killing Joke and Red Beat. In June 1980, this new partnership produced the second single "Agent Orange" b/w "Driving". Largely inspired by the film Apocalypse Now, Lowery's lyrics referenced the defoliant used in the Vietnam War and the song itself was built around a pulsing three-note bassline, guitar harmonics and a metronomic beat. Synthesizer atmospherics on the track were provided by Killing Joke's Jaz Coleman. The single was released later in 1980 and became their best known song.

In early 1981, Peter Balmer had left to join Fad Gadget, and was replaced by bassist Francis Cook. The new line-up of the band recorded a session for the BBC's John Peel show in January 1981. Three tracks "Cut", "Extinguish" and "Where The Buffalo Roam" were broadcast on 19 January and repeated again later that year. A third single "Cut" b/w "Faith in Transition" was released on Malicious Damage in early Summer. The band's final recording session, in April 1981, with engineer Mark Lusardi yielded three new songs: "Version Of A Life", "Extinguish" and "Concrete Eternal", none of which were released at the time, as the band finally fell apart in August. Ian Lowery and Francis Cook went on to form F for Fake, with Lowery and Alan Cole later reuniting in Folk Devils, while Nick Clift went to work for Rough Trade. A fourth single, "Bright Shiny Things", was released by Clever Metal in September 1982.

Clift and Lowery re-united briefly in the second incarnation of Folk Devils in 1986, recording the EP The Best Protection for Beggars Banquet's Situation 2 label.

A collection of the band's work, Versions Of A Life (Recordings 1979-1981), which includes the three tracks from the final recordings session was released in 2014.

== Discography ==
=== Singles ===
- "Everything Is Temporary" (1980), Clever Metal – UK Independent no. 44
- "Agent Orange" (1980), Malicious Damage
- "Cut" (1981), Malicious Damage
- "Bright Shiny Things" (1981), Clever Metal

=== Compilation album ===
- Versions Of A Life (Recordings 1979-1981) (2014), Dark Entries/Definitive Gaze
