= Chappaquiddick =

Chappaquiddick may refer to:

- Chappaquiddick Island, a small island on the eastern end of Martha's Vineyard, Massachusetts
- Chappaquiddick incident, Ted Kennedy's July 1969 automobile accident which occurred on the island
- Chappaquiddick (film), a 2017 American docudrama based on the 1969 incident
- Chappaquiddick Tribe of the Wampanoag Indian Nation, a nonprofit organization that self-identifies as a Native American tribe in Massachusetts

== See also ==
- Chappaquiddick Bridge, a 1980 punk album by Poison Girls
- Chappaquiddick Skyline, a band fronted by Joe Pernice
- Chappaqua, New York, a hamlet in Westchester County
