= Chris Ward (playwright) =

English–Canadian director and playwright, born 1958

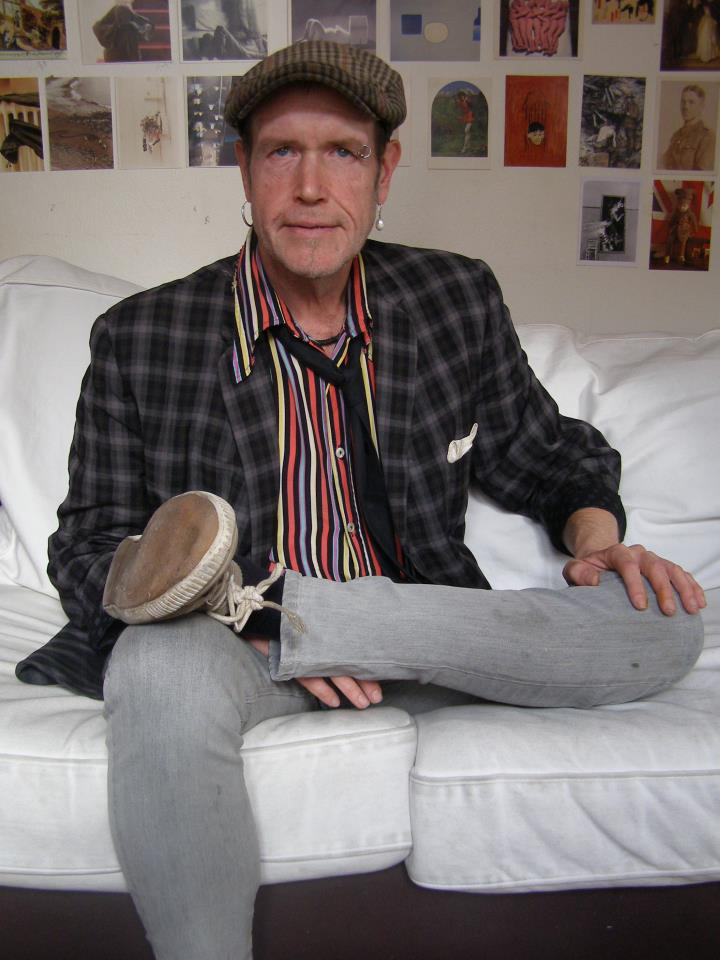
Chris Ward in 2015

Chris Ward (born 1958) is an English-Canadian film and theatre director and playwright.

== Life and career ==
From 1979 to 1982, Chris Ward attended the London International Film School. The school had no courses in screenwriting and so Ward began writing for the stage. His play Demonstration of Affection was produced at the Arts Theatre in London in June 1981, starring the musicians Richard Jobson (of the band the Skids) and Honey Bane (formerly of the band Fatal Microbes). The play generated controversy for its supposed depiction of "live sex" on stage.

Starting in 1981, he produced and directed his own work with the Wet Paint Theatre Company in various fringe and pub theatre venues in London, as well as performing dramatic scenes at punk concerts. The company, often described as "punk theatre" (a label which Ward rejects), was distinguished by its mixing of professionally-trained actors with musicians (often from punk bands) and other non-professional artistes. According to Ward, "We began to recruit from bands and chance encounters at gigs, squats, anarchy centres, and sometimes even from casual conversations in the street." The ethos was collaborative and similar to guerilla theater. Ward chose to recruit these inexperienced actors as he found that trained actors had difficulty expressing the raw emotion of his work. One reviewer described a performance as "rough, angry, unsubtle" as well as "not for the squeamish (nor for perfectionists)." In Demonstration of Affection, the actors smashed real chairs and bottles onstage, a theme which was repeated in Plastic Zion. Another play closed abruptly when its assistant director threatened the audience with a knife. Amongst the performers who passed through the ranks of Wet Paint were Jobson, Bane, Simon Tedd (Simon Scardanelli), Beki Bondage, Max Splodge, Michelle Brigandage, George Cheex (from !Action Pact!), Ruth Radish (from Hagar the Womb), and Jenny Runacre.

Ward's play about Jean Vigo, Love's A Revolution, was the basis of the 1998 film Vigo, directed by Julien Temple. Ward's play was adapted from Paulo Emilio Salles Gomez's Jean Vigo. Previously, Ward had collaborated with Derek Jarman on a number of unrealised film projects, including a film of Ward's play Camberwell Beauty and a proposed television project on the life of Jean Cocteau.

Plastic Zion was revived at the White Bear Theatre in London in 2006. In 2008, Wet Paint Theatre Company revived Demonstration of Affection and Planet Suicide at the Foundry in London.

In 2008 Ward wrote and directed the short film What Shall We Do with the Drunken Sailor?, based on the life of artist/model Nina Hamnett, the self-styled Queen of Bohemia. The film stars Siobhan Fahey (singer with Bananarama and Shakespears Sister), Clive Arrindel, Donny Tourette (frontman with the punk band Towers of London), and Honey Bane.

In 2012, Chris Ward's script, Hound: Visions in the Life of the Victorian poet Francis Thompson was staged at the Riverside Studios, Hammersmith, and then toured London's churches including St Giles-in-the Fields and in St Olav's (City of London) in May 2014. A film of Hound is in production with a cast including Wayne Sleep, Gary Shail, Toyah Willcox, Hazel O'Connor and Lex Stephenson. The role of Francis Thompson is played by Daniel Hutchinson.

The following year, 2013, he wrote and directed a feature film produced by Frank Schofield based on his play Camberwell Beauty with the performers Jenny Runacre, Rachel Darq, Clive Arrindell, and Lindsay Armaou (from the girl band B*witched) taking major roles. The film was released in 2014.

== Plays ==
- Vermouth (Pentameters Theatre, 1980)
- Demonstration of Affection (Cockpit/Arts Theatre, 1981)
- Castles in Spain (New End Theatre, 1981)
- Plastic Zion (Wet Paint, 1982)
- Camberwell Beauty (Wet Paint, 1982)
- Love's A Revolution, the life of Jean Vigo (Wet Paint, 1983)
- Amphibious Babies (Wet Paint, 1983)
- Cat Food (Wet Paint, 1984)
- Planet Suicide (Wet Paint, 1985)
- Furious Holiday (Wet Paint, 1987)
- Gods Drumming (Wet Paint, 1994)
- Ethel Lee and Grabs (Wet Paint, 1996)
- Hound: Visions in the Life of the Victorian poet Francis Thompson (Wet Paint, 2012)

== Films ==
- Vosper's Boys (1981)
- What Shall We Do With The Drunken Sailor (2008)
- Camberwell Beauty (2013)
- HOUND (Visions in the Life of the Poet Francis Thompson) (2025)
