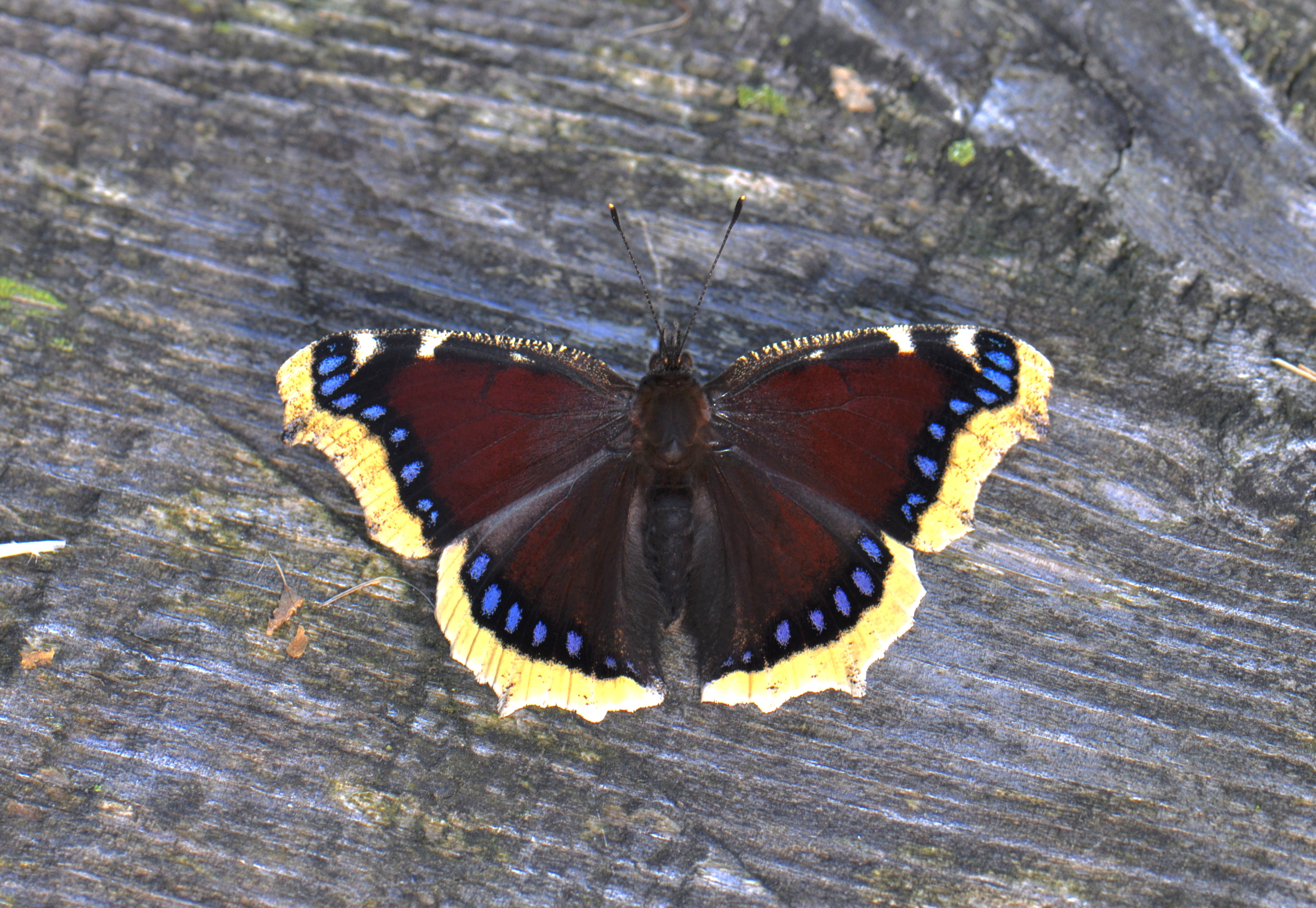
- Upperside
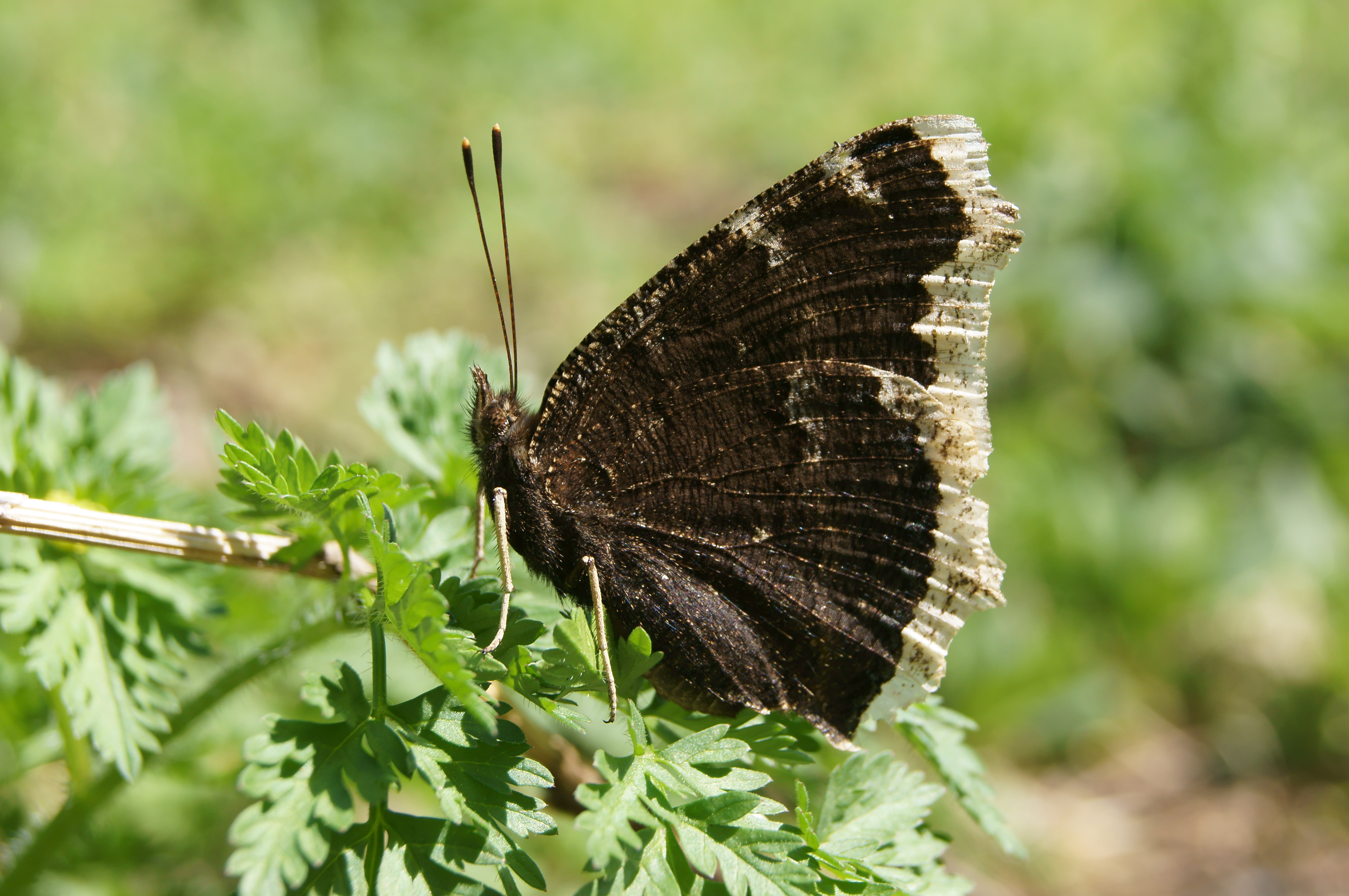
- Underside

Conservation status
- Secure (NatureServe)

Scientific classification
- Kingdom: Animalia
- Phylum: Arthropoda
- Clade: Pancrustacea
- Class: Insecta
- Order: Lepidoptera
- Family: Nymphalidae
- Genus: Nymphalis
- Species: N. antiopa

Binomial name
- Nymphalis antiopa (Linnaeus, 1758)

= Nymphalis antiopa =

Species of butterfly

Nymphalis antiopa, known as the mourning cloak in North America and the Camberwell beauty in Britain, is a large butterfly native to Eurasia and North America. The immature form of this species is sometimes known as the spiny elm caterpillar. Other older names for this species include grand surprise and white petticoat. A powerful flier, this species is sometimes found in areas far from its usual range during migration.

These butterflies have a lifespan of 11 to 12 months, one of the longest lifespans for any butterfly. It is the state insect of the U.S. state of Montana, adopted in 2001.

== Etymology ==
The specific epithet antiopa is thought to be derived from Antiope, a common name in Greek mythology.

=== North American name "mourning cloak" ===
In several European countries with Germanic languages, other than Britain, the name for this butterfly literally translates to "mourning cloak", such as German "Trauermantel", Dutch "rouwmantel", Swedish "sorgmantel" and Norwegian "sørgekåpe". Finnish "suruvaippa" is also a calque of the Germanic names. This suggests it is a name which came with Scandinavian or German rather than with British settlers, for whom this species would be considerably less familiar. Other common names include: Czech "Černopláštník" . "Babočka osiková". Polish "Rusałka żałobnik". Russian "Траурница" . Japanese "キベリタテハ" . Chinese "黄縁立羽". L. Hugh Newman likened the butterfly's pattern to a girl who, disliking having to be in mourning, defiantly let a few inches of a bright dress show below her mourning dress.

=== British name "Camberwell beauty" ===
The name originated from the discovery of two individuals at Coldharbour Lane in Camberwell in August 1748. Camberwell is in South London, about three miles south of London Bridge—in reporting this, the author Moses Harris named the species grand surprise or Camberwell beauty (Bretherton & Emmet, 1990).

In Britain, the English name is 'Camberwell beauty', but the Welsh name is 'y fantell alar', which means 'mourning cloak'.

== Subspecies ==
Subspecies include:

- N. a. antiopa (Linnaeus, 1758)
  - The nominotypical subspecies. Type-locality: "Sweden"
- N. a. hyperborea (Seitz, 1913) (Canada, Alaska)
  - This subspecies lays more amber-yellow eggs, instead of the olive-green. As the eggs develop, the coloration will change to lilac pinkish-purple. These larvae's spines are shorter and stouter than those of European mourning cloak larvae. and the spots bordering the wing edges may be more of a violet color.
- N. a. lintnerii (Fitch, 1857) (slightly larger than preceding; se Canada, eastern US)
- N. a. asopos (Fruhstorfer, 1909) (Japan)

== Distribution ==
The mourning cloak butterflies are distributed broadly around the northern hemisphere. They are commonly found throughout all of North America and northern Eurasia. Three subspecies of mourning cloak butterflies are found throughout North America: northern Nymphalis antiopa hyperborea Seitz, 1913; eastern N. a. lintnerii Fitch, 1857; southwestern N. a. thomsoni Butler, 1887. They can usually be found in hardwood forests, though they have been found in virtually all habitats. They may also be found as far as the northern part of South America, though they are typically not seen as frequently in southern states such as Florida, Louisiana, or Texas. They are also found in temperate and even arctic Asia.

Migrants arrive in Great Britain most years during summer and autumn, but numbers are usually very low. There is no evidence that the species breeds in Britain; it is thought that mild, wet winters prevent them from surviving there for very long. The 'Butterfly Farmer' L. Hugh Newman raised thousands for release at his 'farm' in Bexley, but none were seen the following spring. Specimens stored in his refrigerator for the winter, however, survived. In a book he said that Camberwell Beauty catches in England were suspiciously concentrated around London, Hull and Harwich, all these being ports in the timber trade with Scandinavia, and theorized that they had hibernated in stacks of timber which was then shipped to England, and had not traveled naturally.

== Morphology ==
=== Eggs ===
Mourning cloak eggs are amber-yellow or pale olive-green when first laid. Upon further development, the coloration of the eggs will change, becoming lilac-pink, and darkening to almost black, as they mature prior to hatching. The eggs are generally 0.7 by 0.9 mm in size. Laid on terminal shoots of the larval food-plant, encircling the stem. Later in season, when the leaves appear, females also lay the eggs on the upper surface.

=== Larvae ===
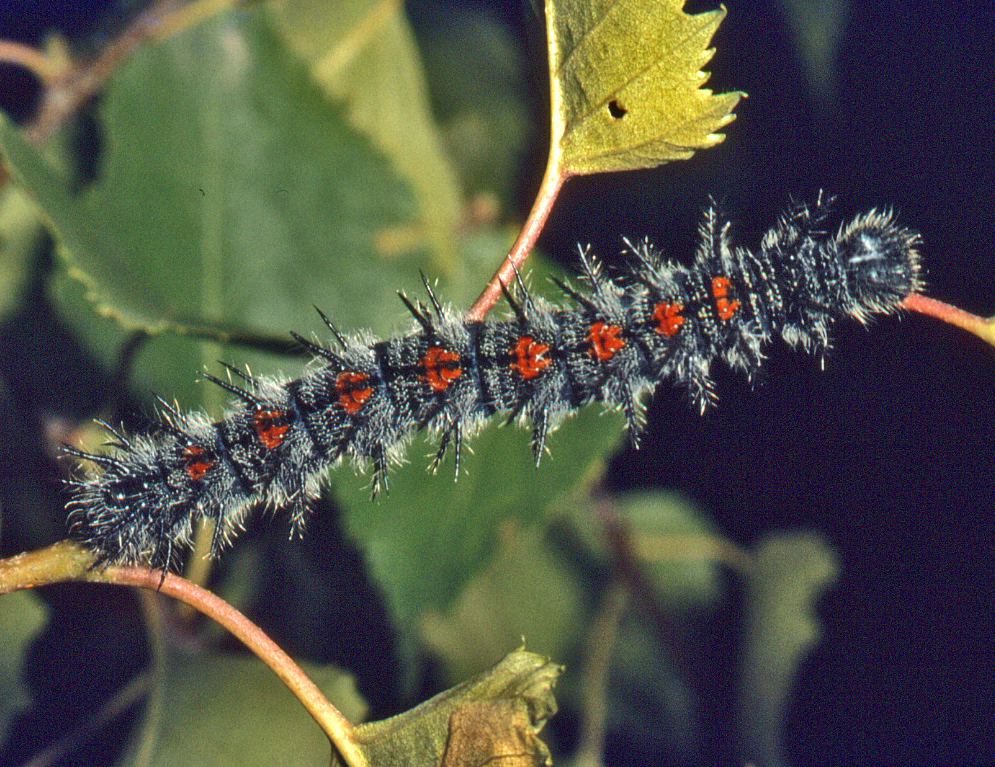
Caterpillar of Nymphalis antiopa

The spiny caterpillars are striking in appearance, with black bodies and a line of eight reddish-orange dots running down the back (aposematic, warning coloration). The prolegs are dark red. The body is covered with short hairs and black spines and white dots. The fully grown mourning cloak caterpillars attain two inches in length.

=== Pupae ===
Mourning cloak pupae are on average 0.8 inches (2.0 cm) in length, though they can reach over 1.1 inches (2.8 cm) in length. They tend to be a tan or brown gray, with two rows of sharp, red-tipped spikes protruding from the ventro-lateral side of the pupae. The chrysalis has a "beak", tubercles, and two head horns.

=== Adult ===
The mourning cloak butterfly is a large, unique butterfly, with special markings that do not match those of any other butterfly, making it easily distinguishable. It can have a wingspan up to four inches. The dorsal side of its wings are a dark maroon, or occasionally brown, with ragged pale-yellow edges. Bright, iridescent blue spots line the black demarcation between the maroon and the yellow. The ventral side of the wings has gray striations, with the same pale-yellow edges. They are a part of the family Nymphalidae, called the brush-footed butterflies due to their hairy front legs. The species does not display any obvious sexual dimorphism.

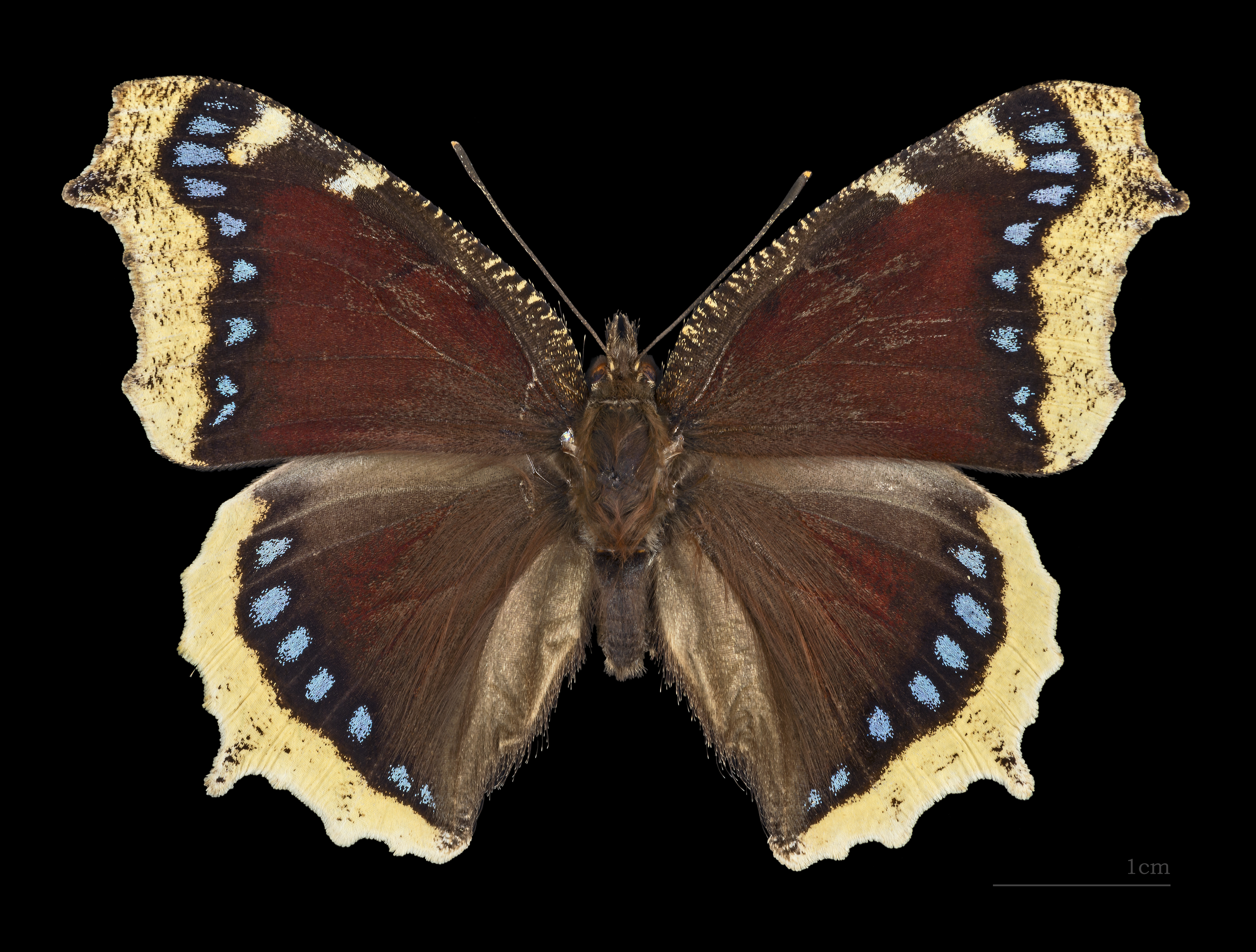
Male, dorsal side

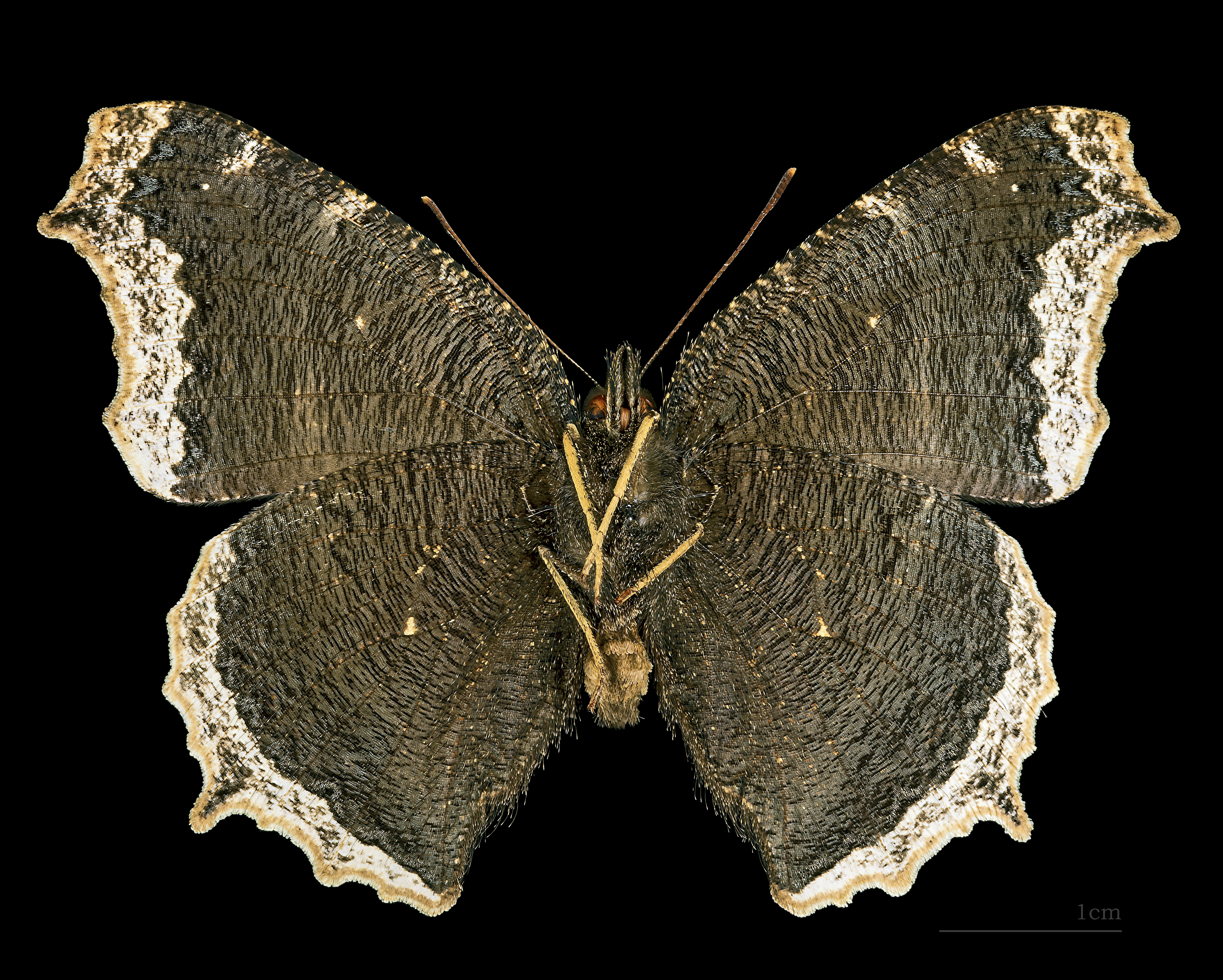
Male, ventral side

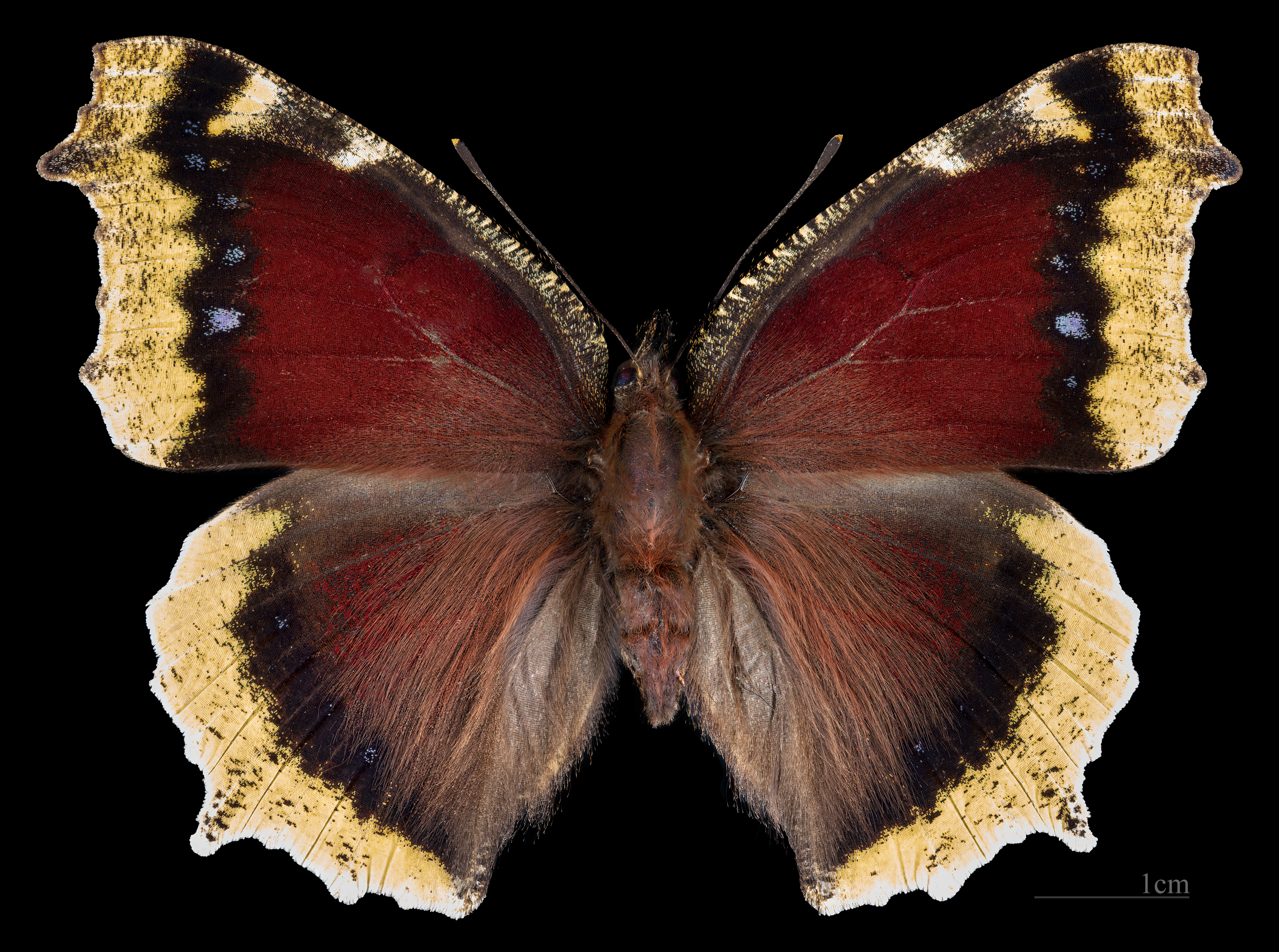
Aberrant form Ex larva ♂

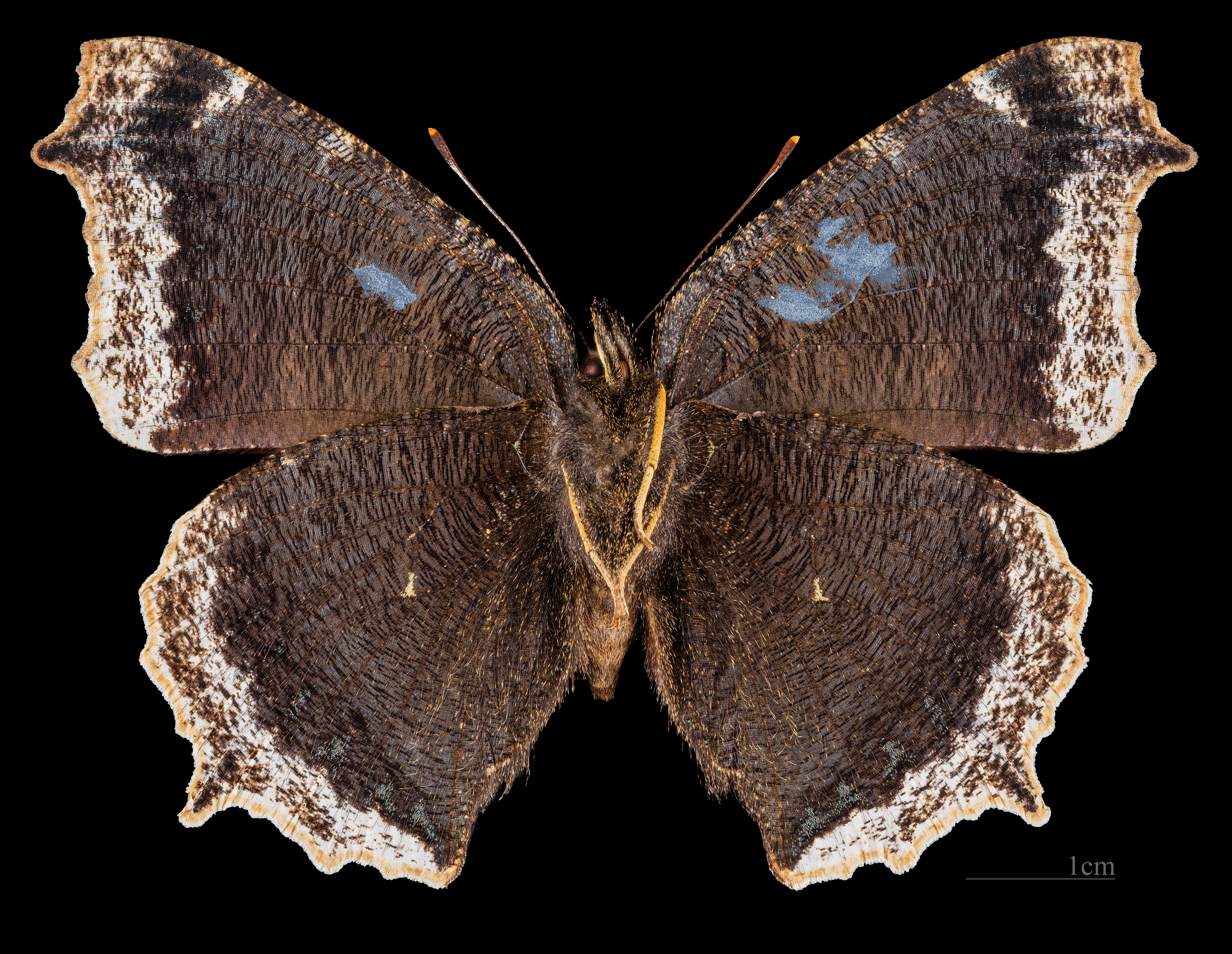
Aberrant form Ex larva ♂ △

== Reproduction and development ==
=== Mating system ===
Mourning cloak butterflies display polygynous mating behavior, where an individual male will mate with multiple females throughout one breeding season. He will either use a display site to attract females or fly around searching for females that are more widely dispersed in a process called scramble competition polygyny. This means that male mourning cloak butterflies primarily lek, or display territorial behavior, in which they settle and defend desirable areas, such as those that either offer increased probability of females or those that provide ample amounts of good resources. The more desirable territories will be able to increase the males' chances of reproductive success. Thus, lekking maximizes the males' ability to attract the most female butterflies, either by being in a prime location to view them or to have a location that females would want to visit. Locations of choice typically include sunny perches near ravines, wood margins, parks, gardens, lakes, ponds, around stream edges, or canyons in which males can perch and defend for multiple days. These locations can be more than an area of 300 square meters. Given the male-male competition for mating, this strategy offers males an ideal location in order to maximize success in territorial protection, and thus mating. Despite the fact that butterflies, particularly the mourning cloak butterflies, have an affinity for perches on high objects, they are not known to display any hilltopping behavior, where male butterflies fly up to perch on hill summits.

Spring marks the beginning of their mating season, when female mourning cloaks will find a host plant and begin to lay their eggs. Adult mourning cloak butterflies can first be seen in late spring through early summer. They then aestivate for the summer, where they will enter into a "dormant" state similar to that of hibernation. In concordance with this is the mourning cloak butterflies' exhibition of diapause, which is a suspension in development in response to certain conditions, such as environmental stimuli. They will break diapause once some, though not all, of the butterflies start to migrate through September and October. They then overwinter, and then restart their mating cycle throughout the spring, from April through June.

=== Life cycle ===
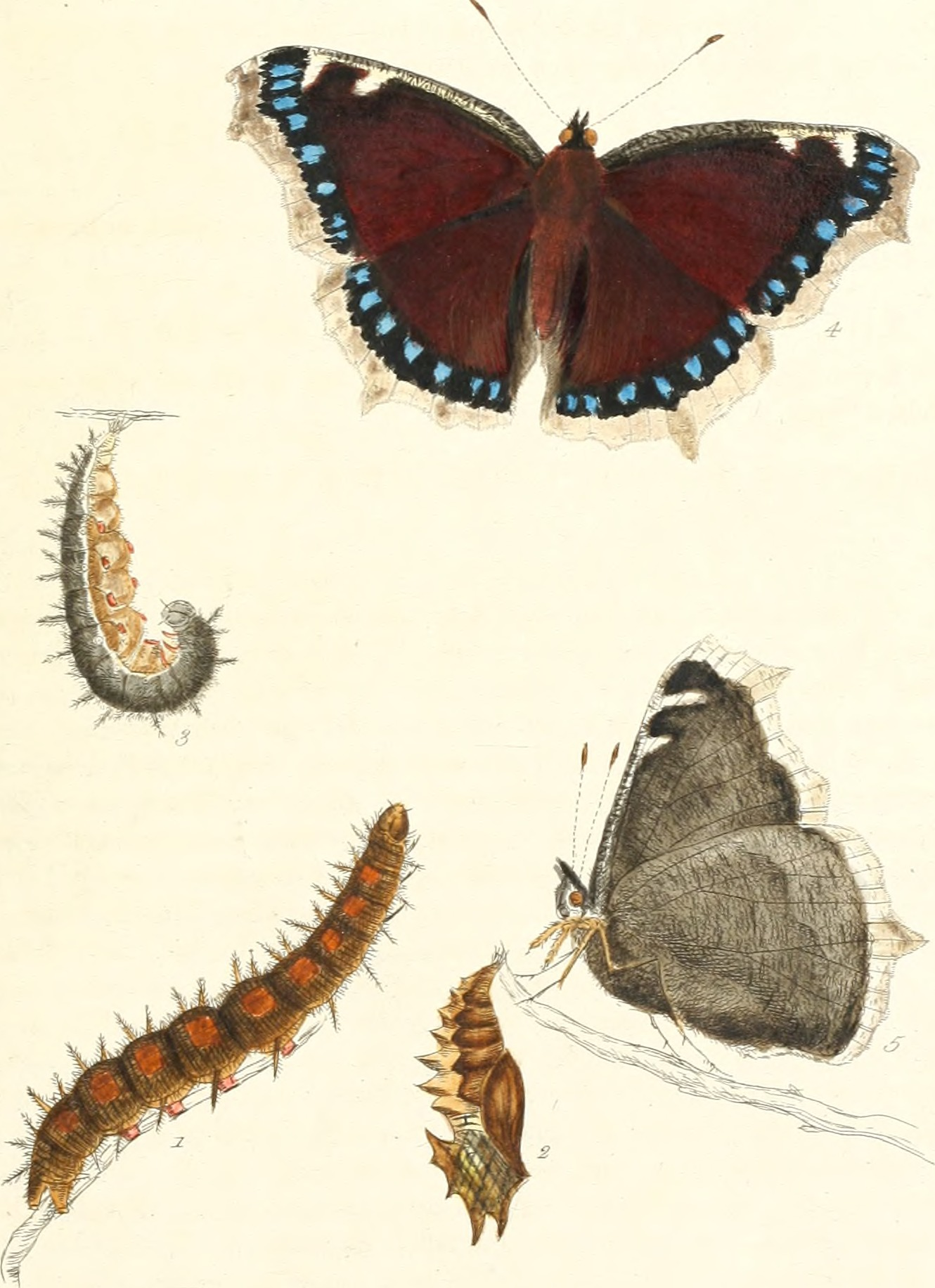
Illustration from The Papilios of Great Britain

Mourning cloaks, like all other butterflies, undergo complete metamorphosis. Egg →Larva (L1 ... L5) → Pupa → Adult. Before the leaves bud-out, Mourning cloaks are known to lay their eggs as ring clusters around the terminal twigs on host plants. The host plant selection is vital because it provides the food source for the young caterpillars. Females are known to have multiple broods, typically up to two to three. The newly hatched caterpillars will group together until they shed their skin—termed an instar for each shedding. This shedding event occurs four times throughout development in a process called ecdysis. The larvae experience a fifth skin shed to produce a fully grown caterpillar. The next stage in the mourning cloak's life cycle is to morph into a pupa and then cocoon in a process that encases the creature in a tan or gray chrysalis, which will hang from the stems of grass. This pupa stage allows for resting and further maturation. This metamorphosis takes approximately fifteen days. Following development as the chrysalis is the emergence of an adult mourning cloak butterfly.

Studies show that the mourning cloaks use endocrine mechanisms similar to other lepidopterans to regulate female-specific protein synthesis, oogenesis, and male and female reproductive gland development. Juvenile hormone (JH) is involved in the regulation of oogenesis and development of the male and female reproductive glands in the mourning cloak butterfly.

== Behavior ==
The adult butterflies hibernate during the winter months. Typical locations of overwintering include tree cavities and on the ground underneath loose tree bark (covered by snow). They often emerge from hibernation before the snow has completely melted, making it one of the first butterflies to take wing in the spring.

The mourning cloak is a non-migratory species but some sources suggest that a portion of the North American population migrates southward. Experiments carried out in Germany by Hubert Roer in 1962-68, documented a long-distance (one way) migration from Bonn to Greece (Chalkiditi).

== Ecology ==
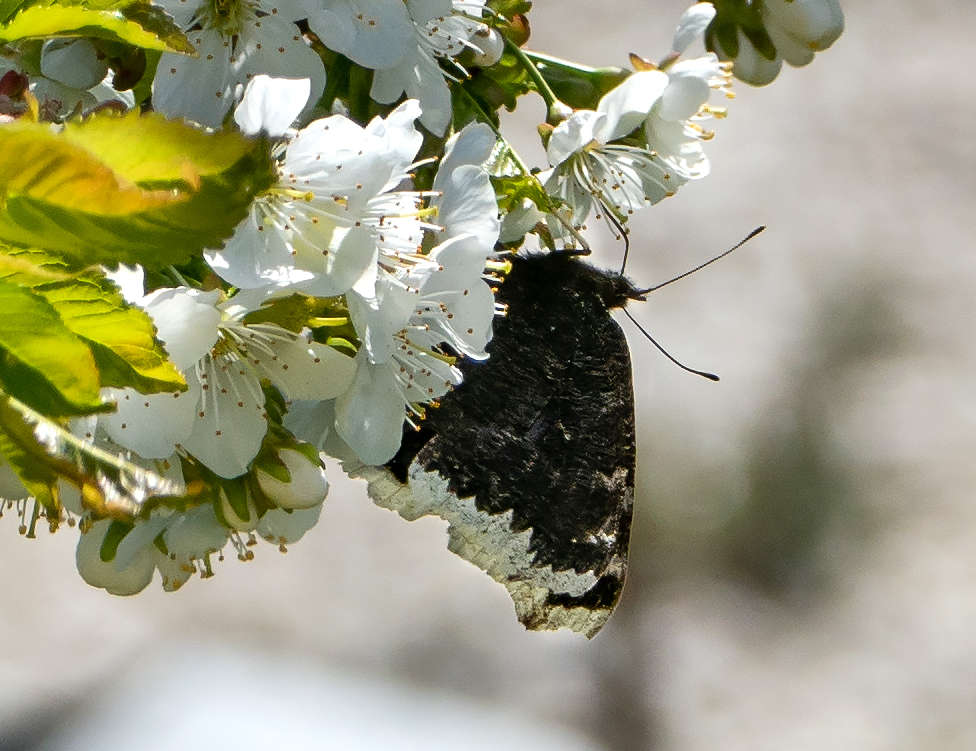
Mourning cloak nectaring on cherry blossoms

=== Larval food-plants ===
Upon hatching, the caterpillars will begin to eat the leaves of the larval food-plant. A large number of food-plant plants was recorded, such as willow (Salix nigra, Salix pentandra, Salix caprea, Salix aurita, Salix cinerea, Salix phylicifolia), American elm, hackberry, hawthorn, wild rose, Betula species (Betula verrucosa, Betula chinensis), Alnus incana and poplar. The caterpillars live gregariously in communal silken nest on the host-plant, until they disperse prior to pupation.

Adult mourning cloaks primarily feed on sap, ripe and fallen fruits and sugary exudate from aphids, very rarely seen nectaring on flowers.

=== Predation ===
The mourning cloak butterfly faces many predators throughout its development. The mourning cloak's eggs can be eaten by predators such as beetles, true bugs, ants, beetle larvae, wasps, assassin bugs, and mites. Some of the butterflies' major predators include praying mantises, assassin bugs, dragon flies, and vertebrate predators such as birds, reptiles, amphibians, and mammals.

=== Defense mechanisms ===
An anti-predation mechanism the mourning cloaks have employed as adult butterflies is camouflage. To do this, the butterflies fold their wings back when attached to trees as their folded wings will provide camouflage against the dark backdrop of the trees.

An additional anti-predation tactic used by the mourning cloaks is to join together with other butterflies in a perch and fly menacingly towards their attackers—most often birds or other butterflies.

Mourning cloaks also play dead by closing their wings tightly together and tucking their legs up against their body for protection and holding completely still. They will maintain this for a few minutes before returning to their natural healthy and lively behavior.

Further defense mechanisms include loud clicks when the mourning cloak flies away from a predator.

To protect themselves from the cold weather of their habitats, mourning cloaks will find areas under direct sunlight. This behavior, in conjunction with their darkly-colored wings, allows for maximum heat absorption.

Newly hatched mourning cloak caterpillars can display selfish behavior, such as siblicide, by eating non-hatched eggs. The larvae also group together for the duration of their development, preventing some predation by numbers. The larvae and pupae can also respond to disturbances by twitching simultaneously – this may be performed as a defense mechanism.

=== Pollination ===
Mourning cloak butterflies are not known to be significant pollinators, since their primary food source is sap of deciduous trees rather than flowering plants. However, they still can occasionally act as pollinators.

== Relationship to people ==
=== Pests ===
On occasions, the gregarious mourning cloak larvae will completely defoliate ornamental trees, in nurseries, plantations, and parks. Some areas that this damage has been documented have been Oregon and Canada. The young willows and poplars could be completely defoliated due to the caterpillars, though mature trees tend not to be affected.

=== Research ===
Mourning cloak butterflies have been a part of some epigenetics experiments testing to determine if the environment affects certain butterfly phenotypic characteristics. Scientists hypothesized that traumatic heat or cold shocks "during a critical period of its development can cause profound changes". The first experiments occurred in the 1890s. The mourning cloaks were temperature shocked at specific times in their development, which led to differences in pupae color. It was later learned that the color change was due to hormonal changes in response to varying temperatures.

=== Conservation ===
Mourning cloak butterflies are protected by law in Switzerland and Austria, though they generally have an increasing trend regarding population density in Finland. They also assume "safe" status in the Czech Republic. In general, the mourning cloak butterflies find areas that have experienced fire breaks to be more inviting, presumably because the fire breaks increase the amount of open space and clearings available to the butterflies, which is a more ideal habitat for these butterflies to live in.

== Popular culture ==
- The Camberwell Beauty figures in the short story "A Plague of Butterflies" by Fred M. White, published in The Chronicle, Adelaide, Australia, 28 December 1918.
- Camberwell Beauty is a buddleia cultivar raised by Elizabeth Keep at the East Malling Research Station.
- There is a large mosaic of a Camberwell Beauty on the wall of the Passmore Edwards library, baths and wash house in Burgess Park, a large park that is close to the south London suburb of Camberwell. The Camberwell Beauty was the emblem of the Samuel Jones paper company and was previously on their factory on nearby Southampton Way, but was moved when the factory was demolished in 1982. A photograph of the mosaic was used on the cover of Camberwell indie band The House of Love on their self-titled 1990 album.
- Camberwell Beauty is a novel by Louis Golding, published in 1935.
- "The Adventure of the Camberwell Beauty" is a short story by August Derleth, published in 1952 in Three Problems for Solar Pons. The Solar Pons stories are pastiche stories of the Sherlock Holmes tales.
- The Camberwell Beauty (ISBN 978-0-701-12067-2) is a collection of short stories by VS Pritchett, published in 1974.
- Camberwell Beauty (ISBN 978-0-316-85318-7) is the first novel by the comedian Jenny Eclair, published in 2000.
- Camberwell Beauty is a 2015 short film directed and written by Chris Ward and featuring Lindsay Armaou. The film is about the lead singer in a punk band, 'Camberwell Beauty', who undergoes plastic surgery to reconstruct her face after a motorbike accident, but is horrified to discover that she is now beautiful. It was originally a 1982 play, of the same name, by Ward.
- "Camberwell Beauty" is a track on the 2017 album Ealing Feeder by composer Sarah Angliss.
- Mourning Cloak Episode 10 Season 7 Fear The Walking Dead references the butterfly throughout the storyline.
