= The Very Things =

English post-punk band

- Origin: Redditch, England
- Genres: Post-punk
- Years active: 1983–1988
- Labels: Corpus Christi, Reflex, Strange Fruit, One Little Indian, Fire
- Spinoff of: The Cravats
- Members: The Shend; Robin Raymond; Gordon Disneytime; Jim Davis; Steven Burrows; Vincent Johnson; John Graham; Robert Holland; Paul Green

The Very Things are an English Dadaist post-punk band from Redditch, Worcestershire, England, formed in 1983 and active until 1988. The band reformed in 2024 and released a new album, Mr. Arc-Eye (Under a Cellophane Sky), on 26 July that year.

== History ==
When the Cravats split up in 1982, guitarist Robin Raymond (a.k.a. Robin R. Dalloway) and bassist/singer The Shend (a.k.a. Chris Shendo, born Chris Harz) formed The Very Things, recruiting drummer Gordon Disneytime (a.k.a. Robin Holland), bassist Jim Davis (guitarist with Redditch band CKV) for the first live gigs, followed by bassist Steven Burrows (a.k.a. Fudger O'Mad or Budge), a member of And Also the Trees. The band also originally had a horn section of Vincent Johnson, John Graham, Robert Holland, and Paul Green. Debut single "The Gong Man" was released on Crass's label in November 1983, with "The Bushes Scream While My Daddy Prunes" following in June 1984, now signed to Reflex Records. A short film was made based on the latter for Channel 4's The Tube. The band's debut album was released in August 1984, after which the band was trimmed to the core trio. Several singles and EPs followed over the next few years, although a cover of R. Dean Taylor's "There's a Ghost in My House" was withdrawn in 1987 due to the Fall's version appearing at the same time. By 1988, the band had split up, although they had recorded enough material for an album release on One Little Indian, the Motown-influenced Motortown. The original albums, along with a collection of non-album tracks, were reissued by Fire Records in 1994.

The Very Things recorded two Peel Sessions, in 1983 and 1987, and two tracks, "The Bushes Scream While My Daddy Prunes" and "This Is Motortown" featured in the Festive Fifty.

The Shend formed a new band, Grimetime, and has since gone on to an acting career, appearing in television series including EastEnders, Red Dwarf, The Bill, Men Behaving Badly and Torchwood.

== Discography ==
Chart placings are from the UK Independent Chart.

=== Albums ===
- The Bushes Scream While My Daddy Prunes (1984), Reflex; reissued 1994 by Fire Records
- Live at The Zap Club, Brighton (1987), B.P.
- Motortown (1988) One Little Indian, reissued (1994), Fire
- It's a Drug, It's a Drug, It's a Ha Ha Ha, It's a Trojan Horse Coming Out of the Wall (1994), Fire

=== Singles/EPs ===
- "The Gong Man" (1983), Corpus Christi
- "The Bushes Scream While My Daddy Prunes" (1984), Reflex - No. 21
- "Mummy You're a Wreck" (1985), Reflex - No. 11
- "This Is Motortown" (1986), DCL Electric - No. 14
- "Let's Go Out" (1988), One Little Indian - No. 22
- "The Peel Session (17.12.83)" (1988), Strange Fruit
