= Rubella Ballet =

English gothic anarcho-punk band

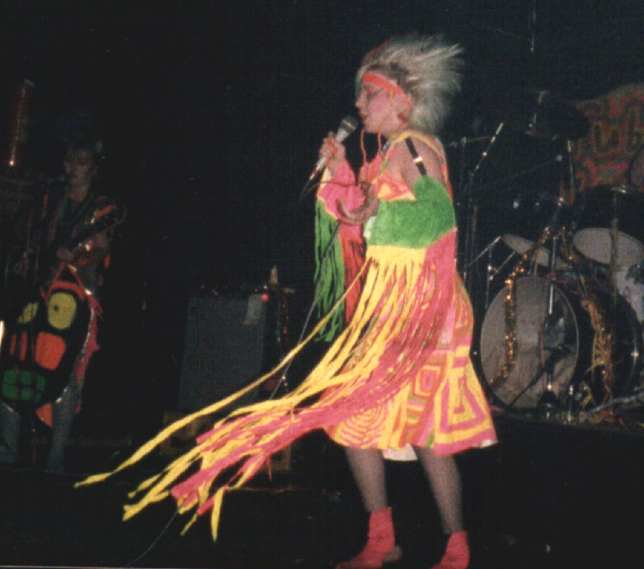
- Rubella Ballet playing at the Clarendon Club, London, Christmas Eve 1985

Background information
- Origin: London, England
- Genres: Punk rock, anarcho-punk, post-punk, gothic rock
- Years active: 1979–1991, 2000–present
- Labels: Xntrix, Ubiquitous
- Members: Sid Truelove; Zillah Minx; Emily Flea
- Past members: Gem Stone; It; Annie Anxiety; Womble; Sean; Adam; Rachel Minx; Steve Cachman; Pete Fender; Phil; Paris Ite

Rubella Ballet are an English gothic anarcho-punk band formed in 1979, who released several albums before splitting up in 1991. They reformed in 2000.

== History ==
The band was formed by drummer Sid Truelove (born Grant Carol, 18 April 1960, Sutton Coldfield, a former chef, later also the drummer with Flux of Pink Indians), former Fatal Microbes Pete Fender (Dan Sansom, guitar), Gem Stone (Gemma Sansom, bass) and It (Quentin North, also bass), with vocalists Annie Anxiety and Womble. Annie, Womble and It were involved only initially, left and were replaced by vocalist Zillah Minx (born Zillah Elaine Ashworth, 31 March 1961, Birkenhead). Fender and Stone were the son and daughter of Poison Girls singer Vi Subversa. The band used Poison Girls equipment to jam and write songs and their first performance was when they took to the stage at a Crass/Poison Girls concert. They had originally been called Rubella Babies. The band's first proper gig was a fundraiser for the Theatre Royal in Stratford, which ended in a riot, and the band played frequently, often asking audience members to put them up after gigs.

The new line-up were soon known for wearing brightly coloured dayglo clothes on stage, to differentiate themselves from the anarcho-punk bands who tended to wear black, 'army-surplus' style clothing. Pete Fender left at the end of 1982 and soon afterwards joined Omega Tribe as a full-time member, having been their early mentor and record producer.

The band released one album on cassette tape, entitled Ballet Bag (1981) and a 4 track 7-inch EP, Ballet Dance (1982), both for Poison Girls' XNTRIX Records, after rejecting the opportunity to put out a record on the Crass label. Adrian Thrills, reviewing the single in the NME stated "the Ballet have an appealing sharp edge to their claustrophobic punk thrash, a poppy surge and even a discernable funk readjustment...of course, they could always just be taking the piss". After releasing the "42f" single on Jungle Records (with Sean replacing Fender) the band started their own Ubiquitous label. Rubella Ballet toured extensively with Poison Girls and Crass, and recorded two John Peel sessions for BBC Radio. In 1984, they embarked on an ill-fated tour of Italy to promote "42f". The band had only been given single airline tickets and after a week of playing without getting paid, they returned to England by train.

The band's line-up underwent several changes before their next release, "Money Talks" (1985); Sean and Gem had left, to be replaced by Adam and Rachel Minx (Zillah's younger sister Rachel Irene Jane Ashworth), and Adam himself has replaced by Steve Cachman prior to the recording of the debut album At Last, It's Playtime, the same year, an album that has been described as "chugging mid-paced stuff, many of the tracks dominated by Zillah's steamroller-flat vox". The line-up stabilized over the next few years, the band recording a second album, If... in 1986. A compilation and a double live album followed, but it would be 1990 before the next studio album, At the End of the Rainbow. The band split up shortly after its release, Sid already playing in the dance band Xenophobia.

In 2000, the band reformed for a performance at the European Gathering festival in Milton Keynes, and have continued on and off since, with the core members Sid and Zillah joined by a varying line-up including original guitarist Fender. A retrospective covering the first half of the band's career, Anarchy in the U.V., including Ballet Bag, Ballet Dance, At Last It's Play Time, the 12-inch version of "Money Talks", and two previously unreleased tracks, was released in December 2008. A second volume was released in 2010, containing the remaining tracks from the band's back-catalogue. They went on to release Planet Punk in 2014 and Danger of Death in 2018. In late 2019, Emily Flea joined the band as bassist. Rubella Ballet continue to perform with their most recent release being Rich with Our Money in 2023.

== Discography ==
Chart placings shown are from the UK Indie Chart.

=== Albums ===
- Ballet Bag (1981), XNTRIX (cassette only, with booklet and badge)
- At Last It's Playtime (1985), Ubiquitous, DayGlo2
- IF (1986), Ubiquitous, DayGlo 4
- At the End of the Rainbow (1990), Brave/One Little Indian BND2LP
- Planet Punk (2014), Overground
- Danger of Death (2018), Overground
- Rich with Our Money (2023), No Romance

==== Compilations, live albums, remixes ====
- Cocktail Mix (1987), Ubiquitous, DayGlo5 (Ballet Bag + Ballet Dance)
- The Ballet's Birthday Box (double LP) (1988), Ubiquitous, DayGlo6 (two LPs with badge, poster, cut-out doll, sticker & booklet)
- Greatest Trips (1990), Brave/One Little Indian BND3CD
- Death Rock Daze (2007), UVP Productions UVP001 (Limited Edition)
- Anarchy in the U.V. (2008), Overground
- Nevermind the Day-Glo. (2010), Overground
- Ballet Bag plus 2× John Peel Sessions (2017), Dark Entries
- Day-Glo Daze (2018), Near Dark

=== Singles ===
- Ballet Dance EP (1982), XNTRIX – No. 6 UK Indie Chart
- "42f" (1984), Jungle, JUNG12 (12-inch) – No. 10 UK Indie Chart
- "Money Talks" (1985), Ubiquitous, DayGlo1
- "Arctic Flowers" (1986), Ubiquitous, DayGlo3 (12-inch)

== Video ==
- Freak Box (1984), Ubiquitous - Live concert, 60 min, VHS.
