= The Cravats =

English punk rock band

The Cravats are an English punk rock band originally from Redditch, England, founded in 1977. The 'classic' line up of Robin Dallaway (vocals, guitar), The Shend (vocals, bass guitar), Svor Naan (saxophone) and Dave Bennett (drums) remained constant between March/April 1978 until the close of 1982. Lead vocals in the original incarnation of the band were shared between Dallaway and The Shend. A reformed version of The Cravats including original members The Shend (vocals) and Svor Naan (saxophone), with Rampton Garstang (drums) has been performing since August 2009 and, since 2013 has included Viscount Biscuits (guitar) and Joe 91 (bass guitar).

== History ==
The Cravats were founded in 1977 by Robin Dallaway (vocals, guitar) and The Shend (bass guitar), with Martin Seys (guitar, vocals) and John 'Ethos' Yapp (drums). Svor Naan (saxophone) replaced Seys at the close of 1977. Ethos Yapp left shortly after this line up recorded the first single, "Gordon", in March 1978 and was replaced by Dave Bennett (drums). The first single by the Cravats was the self-financed "Gordon", released in 1978. On 31 July 1979, they recorded their first session for the John Peel show on BBC Radio 1. Soon after, they received a recording contract with Small Wonder Records. Three further Peel Sessions followed on 6 October 1980, 18 August 1981 and 15 November 1982. A first album, In Toytown, was released in 1980.

The band had a rest at the end of 1982 although a second Cravats LP, The Colossal Tunes Out, was released in 1983 on the Corpus Christi label. Dallaway and The Shend formed The Very Things, as well as DCL Locomotive and The Babymen - the latter two had originally featured Svor Naan on guitar. A final release by Dallaway and The Shend as The Cravats DCL was The Land of the Giants EP (1985), but this incarnation did not include either Naan, who had joined Pigbros, or Bennett who had joined The Poison Girls.

== Reformation ==
In 2006, a double CD compilation of Cravats singles and other material was released as The Land Of The Giants - The Best Of The Jazz-Punk Colossals on Overground Records. Included on this compilation is a new track "Seance" created with Paul Hartnoll of Orbital which was also released as a single. Seance was the last Cravats release with Dallaway as lead vocalist.

The Cravats' original members, The Shend and Naan, put together a "live ensemble" for the Rebellion Festival in August 2009. This "live ensemble" continued to play live with gigs in Dublin and London, and further appearances at Rebellion in August 2010, 2011, and 2012, at the Incubate Festival in Tilburg, All Tomorrows Parties and, as special guests of Steve Ignorant (Crass) at his final "Last Supper" show at the Shepherd's Bush Empire.

The Cravats' first LP, The Cravats In Toytown, was reissued in 2012 in both vinyl LP and CD formats. The CD version includes all five singles (A & B sides) originally released by Small Wonder including the band's first single "Gordon"/"Situations Vacant". It is accompanied by an additional CD with a complete remoulding of the original In Toytown 8 track masters by Penny Rimbaud (Crass).

On 11 March 2016, The Cravats released "Jingo Bells"/"Batterhouse", a limited edition 7" released on Overground Records. This was the first product of their new invigorated current incarnation of The Shend (vocals), Svor Naan (saxophone), Rampton Garstang (drums), Viscount Biscuits (guitar) and Joe 91 (bass guitar). The Cravats' third album, Dustbin of Sound, followed on Overground Records in October 2017. The band continue to receive enthusiastic reviews and regular radio plays including by Gideon Coe, Marc Riley and Henry Rollins. In May 2020 The Cravats' fourth album, Hoorahland, was released also on Overground Records. On this album the song 'Now The Magic Has Gone' features a guest performance from Jello Biafra.

In 2020 Overground Records reissued The Colossal Tunes Out on vinyl only.

== Discography ==
Chart placings are from the UK Independent Chart.

=== Albums ===
- The Cravats in Toytown (October 1980, Small Wonder, CRAVAT 1) No. 19 [rereleased 2015, Overground Records]
- The Colossal Tunes Out (1983, Corpus Christi, CHRIST IT'S 8) [rereleased 2020, Overground Records]
- Dustbin of Sound (2017, Overground Records)
- Hoorahland (2020, Overground Records)

=== Compilation albums ===
- The Land of the Giants (November 2006, Overground Records, OVER 112VP)

=== Singles ===
- "Gordon"/"Situations Vacant" (September 1978, Cravats, 7", CH 004, Small Wonder stamped on some copies)
- "Burning Bridges"/"I Hate the Universe"/"The End" (June 1979, Small Wonder, 7", SMALL 15)
- "Precinct"/"Who's in Here with Me" (August 1980, Small Wonder, 7" SMALL 24) No. 3 9
- "Firemen"/"A Flux in 3D: Divide" (March, 1981, Split Flexi Disc, issued free with Dutch magazine Vinyl)
- "You're Driving Me"/"I Am the Dreg" (March 1981, Small Wonder, 7", SMALL 25)
- "Off the Beach"/"And the Sun Shone" (November 1981, Small Wonder, 7", SMALL 26)
- "Terminus"/"Little Yellow Froggy" (February 1982, Glass Records, 7", GLASS 021)
- "Rub Me Out"/"When Will We Fall" (July 1982, Crass Records, 7", 221984/4) No. 15
- "In the Land of the Giants" (February 1986, Reflex, 12", 12RE 10) No. 44
- "Seance" (with Paul Hartnoll) (2006, Caroline True Records)
- "Jingo Bells"/"Batterhouse" (March 2016, Overground Records)
- "Blurred"/"Bigband" (2016, Overground Records)
- "Shy"/"Good for You" (2019, Overground Records)
