= 77: The Year of Punk and New Wave =

2006 book by Henrik Bech Poulsen

- Book cover, first edition
- Author: Henrik Bech Poulsen
- Language: English
- Publisher: Helter Skelter Publishing
- Publication date: 25 February 2006
- ISBN: 978-1900924924

77: The Year of Punk and New Wave (Helter Skelter Publishing, 2006) is a book by Henrik Poulsen that catalogues every punk rock band to have made a recording in the United Kingdom during the punk era. The book has about 200 entries starting with Acme Sewage Company and ending with the Zeros.
