= Ian Lowery =

English singer and poet (1956–2001)

- Born: 27 March 1956; Hartlepool, England
- Died: 14 July 2001 (aged 45) London, England
- Genres: Punk rock, post-punk, alternative rock
- Occupations: Singer-songwriter, poet
- Years active: 1978–2001
- Label: Situation Two
- Website: ianlowery.com

Ian Lowery (27 March 1956 – 14 July 2001) was an English vocalist and poet who fronted several bands, including The Wall, Ski Patrol, Folk Devils, and King Blank, as well as recording as a solo artist.

== Career ==
=== The punk rock years: the Prefabs and the Wall ===
Ian Lowery was born in Hartlepool in 1956. He studied art at Sunderland Polytechnic where in early 1978 he formed his first band, The Prefabs, along with Gordon Craig (guitar), Peter Balmer (bass, vocals), and Alan Henderson (drums), Lowery at the time going by the stage name 'Johnny Yen'. The band played regularly at local venues, but didn't release any records before splitting up later that year.

Lowery then formed The Wall with art college friends John "Joe" Hammond (lead guitar), Andy Gr/iffiths (bass), and Bruce Archibald (drums). A demo tape led to their signing by London independent label Small Wonder, who released the band's first two singles. After relocating to London, Lowery was sacked from the band after a disagreement over who should be the band's guitarist.

=== Ski Patrol, F for Fake, and Phantom White Limb ===
Having relocated to London, Lowery teamed up with another art college friend, Nick Clift, to form Ski Patrol, recruiting Balmer and Archibald to complete the lineup. The band released three singles and recorded a Peel session before splitting up in 1981. Lowery then formed the short-lived jazz-influenced F for Fake, which included former members of Ski Patrol. The band folded after recording a demo and playing live once. Lowery and Clift recorded a further single that was released under the Ski Patrol name in 1982.

Lowery and Clift then teamed up again in Phantom White Limb, which also included Hammond, Louie Sasportas, and Dave Cringle. They recorded four tracks which were set for release before the Malicious Damage label folded. The band split up shortly after.

=== Folk Devils ===
In 1983, Lowery and Kris Jozajtis formed Folk Devils, with the aim of producing music that was "a cross between Country Blues and Einstürzende Neubauten". Former Ski Patrol drummer Alan Cole and bassist Mark Whiteley completed the lineup. They had independent chart success with their first single, "Hank Turns Blue" in 1984, and recorded a Peel session in March 1984. After two EP releases (both indie hits), and two more Peel sessions, the band split up in 1986. Lowery formed a new lineup of the group, retaining Whiteley and teaming up again with Clift, with John Hamilton joining on drums. This second lineup was short-lived, with Robert Mune taking over on bass guitar, and saxophonist Saul Taylor added. Lowery was signed by Beggars Banquet subsidiary Situation Two, but the only release on the label had little impact, and the band split up in late 1987. The label subsequently released a compilation of the band's work.

=== King Blank, the Ian Lowery Group, solo work, and subsequent bands ===
Still contracted to Situation Two, Lowery recorded with a fluid lineup of musicians under the King Blank name. Collaborators included Bill Carter of the Screaming Blue Messiahs (on first single "Mouth Off"), Nigel Pulsford (later of Bush, former Folk Devil Jozajtis, Hugh Garrety, and Kevin Rooney. After 1988's The Real Dirt album and an appearance on Snub TV, Lowery adopted the name 'The Ian Lowery Group' for future work, releasing the album King Blank to * the Ian Lowery Group in 1989, preceded by the single "Need", which was described by Penny Kiley of the Liverpool Echo as "Demanding and dirty, loud, simple and repetitive. Four minutes long and not a superfluous second."

With his Situation Two contract ending in 1990, Lowery subsequently recorded as a solo artist, releasing the single "Time is Gone" in 1992.

In 1992, Lowery relocated to Edinburgh and teamed up with local musicians to form Drug of Choice, the band releasing the album Cooler in 1993. While in Edinburgh he also produced recordings by other bands and continued to write poetry.

Relocating to London in 1994, Lowery formed Blacklist, later to become Memory Zero. He went on to form SquareJohn in 1998 with two female violinists and in 2001 formed SlumRich along with Jim Ledbetter (drums), Nicky Green (guitar), and Joe Griephan (bass).

== Death and legacy ==
On 14 July 2001, Lowery was found dead in his London flat.

Several compilation albums including much previously unreleased material by Lowery and his various bands have been released since his death.

== Discography ==
=== with The Wall ===
- "New Way" (1979), Small Wonder
- "Kiss the Mirror"/"Exchange" (1979), Small Wonder – UK Independent no. 26
- A New Way to Peroxide (2021) (compilation)

=== with Ski Patrol ===
- "Everything is Temporary" (1980), Clever Metal – UK Independent no. 44
- "Agent Orange" (1980), Malicious Damage
- "Cut"/"Faith in Transition" (1981), Malicious Damage
- "Bright Shiny Things" (1982), Clever Metal
- Versions Of A Life (Recordings 1979-1981) (2014), Definitive Gaze (compilation)

=== with Folk Devils ===
- "Hank Turns Blue" (1984), Ganges – UK Independent no. 9
- "Beautiful Monster" (1984), Ganges – UK Independent no. 4
- Fire and Chrome EP (1985), Karbon – UK Independent no. 10
- "The Best Protection" (1987), Situation Two – UK Independent no. 22
- Goodnight Irony LP (1987), Situation Two
- The Best Protection & the BBC Sessions (2015), Beggars Banquet (compilation)
- Beautiful Monsters – Singles And Demo Recordings 1984-1986 (2016), Optic Nerve (compilation)

=== King Blank ===
- "Mouth Off" (1988), Situation Two
- "Uptight" (1988), Situation Two
- "Blind Box" (1988), Situation Two
- The Real Dirt (1988), Situation Two

=== The Ian Lowery Group ===
- "Need" (1989), Situation Two
- King Blank to * the Ian Lowery Group (1989), Situation Two

=== with Drug of Choice ===
- Cooler (1993), Three Lines

=== Solo ===
- "Ian Lowery Speaks" (1990), Eva-Tone Soundheets (flexi-disc)
- "Time Is Gone"/"Sucker Punch" (1992), Resivu
- Get Out the Sun (2014), Spectacle Music Ltd. (compilation)
- Ironic (2015), Spectacle Music Ltd. (compilation)
- Agent Orange'92 plus Drug of Choice Sessions (2017), Spectacle Music Ltd. (compilation)
- The Eye of the Beholder (2019), Spectacle Music Ltd. (compilation)
- But Even Stars Must Die (compilation)
