= The Wall (band) =

English punk rock band

- Origin: Sunderland, England
- Genre: Punk rock
- Years active: 1978–1983, 2007, 2016–2017, 2022–2025
- Labels: Small Wonder, Fresh, Polydor, No Future, Spectacle Music
- Past members: Al Gregg; Steve North; David Kennedy; Clive Bennett; Mark Gibson; Ian Lowery; John Hammond; Bruce Archibald; Nick Ward; Rab Fae Beith; Ivan Kelly; Claire Bidwell; Andy Forbes; Day Raven; Andy Griffiths; Mick Frangou

The Wall were an English punk rock band formed in Sunderland, England, in early 1978. They have released two studio albums.

== History ==
=== Early days ===
Formed in early 1978, the initial line-up was Ian Lowery (vocals), Andy Griffiths (bass, vocals), John Hammond (lead guitar, vocals), and Bruce Archibald (drums), and this line-up recorded the band's debut single, "New Way", which was issued in April 1979. Played regularly by BBC Radio 1 disc jockey John Peel, the single sold well over 10,000 copies. This success led Lowery and Griffiths to relocate to London, although Hammond and Archibald did not follow them permanently and were replaced by Nick Ward on guitar, and by Rab Fae Beith, former drummer with Patrik Fitzgerald (who The Wall had toured with) and The Pack. The band played many gigs around this time, with other Small Wonder bands such as Crass, and the Cockney Rejects. After meeting Paul Cook and Steve Jones, at a gig at the Moonlight Club, the two former Sex Pistols decided they wanted to work with the band, and produced the next single, the double A side "Kiss the Mirror" / "Exchange", The Wall becoming the first punk band to have a record produced by an ex Pistol. Rab became the band's manager, and when their first label Small Wonder ceased operating, he got them a deal with Fresh Records and went into the studio to record the next single "Ghetto", produced by Jimmy Pursey. Although originally recorded with Lowery on vocals, it would be re-recorded with new singer Ivan Kelly (formerly of Ruefrex). Lowery had decided that Ward should be replaced, but the rest of the band disagreed and instead decided that Lowery should go. Lowery went on to form Ski Patrol (with Archibald) and The Folk Devils, as well as recording solo work and was highly regarded by John Peel and later influenced Kurt Cobain and the post punk era. He died in 2001. Former Straps guitarist Andy Forbes was also added to the line-up when Ward decided to leave the band.

=== First album ===
The debut album, Personal Troubles and Public Issues produced by Pete Wilson, was released in late 1980. The band then toured the UK with the Angelic Upstarts. After the tour, an unprovoked drunken attack by Kelly on an elderly man while the band were walking through London, resulted in the singer being immediately sacked from the band, with Griffiths taking over on vocals. The band were given a support slot on the Stiff Little Fingers Go For It national tour, which was a success and recorded the Remembrance EP to coincide with the dates, with a stand-in bassist playing in the live shows. On returning from the tour, Claire Bidwell of The Passions joined on bass guitar, leaving Griffiths free to concentrate on vocals.

=== Second album ===
The band's second album, Dirges and Anthems was released in April 1982, with the band now signed to Polydor Records. Polydor insisted that "Epitaph" be released as a single, but it was outsold by the Hobby for a Day EP released on Fresh Records shortly before, and the band were dropped by Polydor. The Wall were reduced to a duo of Beith and Griffiths, with the addition of guitarist Al Gregg and Claire Bidwell on bass, who soldiered on for one last effort, the Day Tripper four track EP and 10 track 12-inch, in late 1982, before the group split up for good in 1983.

== Post breakup ==
Beith had a short spell with And Also the Trees before joining U.K. Subs in 1984, and running his own RFB record label. He later worked as a motorcycle mechanic.

A collection of the band's independent releases was issued in 1998 on Captain Oi!.

In August 2007, the band reformed for a headline appearance at the Blackpool Rebellion organised by Al Gregg through his Wall MySpace site, with seven of the original members, Andy Griffiths (vocals), Nick Ward (guitars), Al Gregg (guitars & bass), Andrew Forbes (guitars), John Hammond (guitars), Claire Bidwell (bass) and Mark Dyvig (drums); with a warm-up gig the previous night at The Thatched House in Stockport. This was followed by the release of a new live album in August 2009 on Captive Records (Opus Productions/Captive Records). Their debut album, Personal Troubles and Public Issues was re-issued in blue vinyl, and on CD, by Westworld Recordings on 13 May 2016. The Wall reformed in 2017/17 again to play the Opera House at Rebellion. This coincided with the release of the "Damnation Disco" 12-inch, released on Andy Forbes' own Riskaverse Records. There was also a successful UK tour and they played gigs with Spizz Energi.

Andy Griffiths, singer and original bassist, died of cancer during Covid in August 2020; Joe Hammond the band's original guitarist, died in March 2022; and the drummer/manager Rab Fae Beith, died in April 2023, also from cancer.

== Discography ==
Chart placings shown are from the UK Indie Chart.

=== Albums ===
- Personal Troubles and Public Issues (1980) Fresh FRESHLP2 (No. 18) CD: (2016) Westworld Recordings (WW0035CD)
- Dirges and Anthems (1982) Polydor POLS1048 initial copies had free 7-inch EP single (Plastic Smiles / Victims of Future Wars / Missing Presumed Dead) (RAB1)
- The Punk Collection (1998) Captain Oi! AHOY CD95
- The Wall - Live (2009) Opus/Captive Records CAPCD001
- A New Way to Peroxide (2021) (compilation of the Ian Lowery era) Spectacle Music Ltd

=== Singles and EPs ===
- "New Way" b/w "Suckers" / "Uniforms" (1979) Small Wonder SMALL13
- "Kiss the Mirror" / "Exchange" (September 1979) Small Wonder SMALL21 (No. 26)
- "Ghetto" b/w "Another New Day" / "Mercury" (April 1980) Fresh FRESH17 (No. 19)
- "Remembrance" b/w "Hsi Nao" / "Hooligan Nights" (April 1981) Polydor POSP260
- "Hobby for a Day" EP - "Hobby for a Day" / "8334" / "Redeemer" (July 1981) Fresh FRESH27 (No. 14)
- "Epitaph" b/w "Rewind" / "New Rebel" (November 1981) Polydor POSP365
- "Day Tripper" 4 track 7-inch EP/10 track 12-inch EP (December 1982) No Future 02.21 (No. 21)
- "Damnation Disco" 12-inch EP (June 2016) Riskaverse Records
- "Manchuria - Back to the Wall" 4 track EP (February 2022) Spectacle Music Ltd
