= The Zeros (English band) =

English punk band

- Origin: Walthamstow, London, England
- Genres: Punk rock
- Years active: 1977–1979, 2026-
- Labels: Small Wonder Records; ROK Records
- Past members: Steve Godfrey; Phil Gaylor; Steve Cotton; Paul Miller
- Website: The Zeros (UK) myspace page

The Zeros were an English punk band formed in 1977. They were one of "the early English punk groups", as chronicled in Henrik Poulsen's book 77: The Year of Punk and New Wave.

The band is not well documented or recognised online but small pieces of information can be found if you dig deep.

Spotify has mistakenly grouped this band (The UK Zeros) with the US band. If looking for this band’s songs on Spotify then try not to confuse it with the US band’s songs, as they will appear as the same band.

== Career ==
Originally a trio, they were led by Steve Godfrey (guitar/vocals, b.1959, Walthamstow, London), the cousin of Jerry Shirley of Humble Pie. The two other members were Phil Gaylor (drums/vocals) and Steve Cotton (bass/vocals). They released a single called "Hungry" in November 1977 on the Small Wonder Records label. "Hungry" was No 1 on the NME punk chart. That same month, they recorded four songs, including "Hungry", for BBC Radio 1 with John Peel. Paul Miller (guitar/vocals) joined in early 1978. The same year Hugh Stanley Clark became their manager and re-signed the band to "The Label". They released a second single a year later, "What's Wrong with Pop Group".

Sometime in the 2000s, Steve Godfrey created a Myspace page, and posted the Zeros entire discography as well as a series of previously unheard recording sessions and demos.

== Discography ==
=== 7" singles ===
- 1977 - "Hungry" b/w "Radio Fun" (Small Wonder Records)
- 1979 - "What's Wrong with Pop Group" (featured on the "What's Wrong with Pop Group" / "Decisions" split single) (ROK Records) (b/w "Decisions" by Action Replay)
- 2018 - Lost Boys : 1977-1979 (Only Fit for the Bin Records)

== See also ==
- Timeline of punk rock
- List of Peel sessions
- List of British punk bands
