= Camera Obscura (duo) =

English synthpop duo

Camera Obscura are a new wave/synth-pop band formed in 1982 in York, England, by Peter Oldroyd and Nigel James. They signed to Small Wonder Records in 1983 and reached no. 32 on the UK Indie Chart with the single "Destitution". In 1986 the band split, but reformed for a tour of Germany in 2005 after signing to German label Anna Logue Records. They have since released an album of recordings from 1983, Horizons of Suburbia, two singles "Strange Faces" and "Strange Faces 2006" and a live EP from a show in Hannover, Germany.

== Discography ==
=== Albums ===
- Horizons of Suburbia (2005), Anna Logue
- Live in Hannover (8-10-2005) (2007), Anna Logue (with "Strange Faces 2006" 7-inch single)

=== Singles ===
- "Destitution" (1983), Small Wonder
- "Village of Stars" (1983) (unreleased)
- "Strange Faces" (2006), Anna Logue
