= Chappaquiddick Bridge =

Studio album by Poison Girls
- Released: 1980
- Recorded: May–June 1980
- Studio: Southern Studios, London
- Genre: Punk
- Label: Crass – 421984/2PG
- Producer: Penny Rimbaud

Poison Girls chronology
Hex (1979)	Chappaquiddick Bridge (1980)	Where's the Pleasure? (1982)

Chappaquiddick Bridge is the debut studio album by UK band Poison Girls, released in 1980.

== Track listing ==
All tracks written by Poison Girls.

- Side A
1. "Another Hero"
2. "Hole in the Wall (Thisbe's Song)"
3. "Underbitch"
4. "Alienation"
- Side B
1. "Pretty Polly"
2. "Good Time (I Didn't Know Sartre Played Piano)"
3. "Other"
4. "Daughters and Sons"
5. Hidden Track State Control - Rock 'n' Roll
- Single sided flexi-disc, 7" (added at first copies without any cover)
1. "Statement"

== Personnel ==
- Bernhardt Rebours - bass, synthesizer, piano
- Lance D'Boyle - drums, percussion
- Nil - violin
- Gem Stone - vocals
- Vi Subversa - vocals, guitar
- Richard Famous - vocals, guitar

Technical

- John Loder - engineer, recording
- Gee Vaucher - cover photography
