= Stephen Dalton (photographer) =

British wildlife photographer (born 1937)

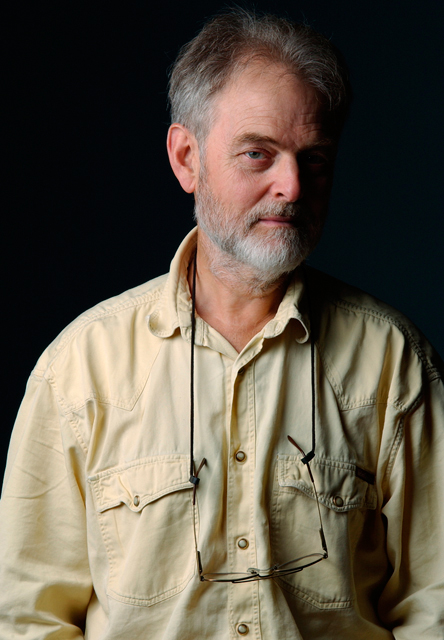
- Dalton in 2012
- Born: 1937 (age 88–89); Surrey
- Spouse: Liz
- Awards: Silver Progress Medal, Royal Photographic Society; Fritz Steiniger Prize, GDT
- Scientific career
- Fields: Nature Photography

Stephen Dalton (born 1937) is an English wildlife photographer and author. He is known for his pioneering work, from the early 1970s onward, in high-speed nature photography. He was the first person to record pin sharp images of insects in flight. His work covers a wide variety of animals: from amphibians and birds to mammals and invertebrates.

== Life and work ==
Dalton was born in Surrey in 1937 and from a young age was an enthusiast for nature and photography. His father, a Royal Air Force officer, had been a bird photographer, and he had a godfather who collected butterflies, moths, and beetles. In the early 1960s he took a full-time photography diploma at London's Regent Street Polytechnic, about which he later recalled, "I had some of the happiest days of my life studying something I became fascinated by".

Dalton's first published article was in Geographical, the magazine of the Royal Geographical Society. He went on to supply images to the Natural History Picture Agency (NHPA) run by the entomologist L. Hugh Newman, whom he had met one day while out chasing wildlife with his camera. Later, when Newman retired, Dalton bought the business, and his NHPA became the UK's premier nature photography library. Dalton sold the agency in 2006.

Dalton started his work on insect photography in the early 1970s, before infrared beams or lasers, using a custom-made arrangement of lenses and mirrors, and a custom-made high-speed shutter. Working with an electronics specialist he devised a flash tube/capacitor combination which provided the required combination of high-power flash and extremely short flash duration. After two years of experimentation he was able for the first time to obtain sharp photographs of insects in flight.

Dalton's first full-colour book, Borne on the Wind (1975) included photographs that showed for the first time insects captured in free flight.

Dalton continues to live with his wife in the farmhouse in Sussex where most of his work has been done. His latest book, My Wood (2017) is a study of a wood he has owned since 1998.

== Critical reception ==
In 2015 the Society of German Wildlife Photographers (GDT) awarded Dalton the Fritz Steiniger Prize. The citation notes that "The results of his experiments in high-speed flash photography and his subsequent publications were landmark events in the world of photography and caused a great stir worldwide" and that "his work of fascinating intensity and striking beauty has set visual and artistic standards that are still valid today".

One of Dalton's insect images was chosen to be carried on NASA's Voyager spacecraft, as part of a series of records designed to convey something of the science and culture of mankind to possible extraterrestrial beings.

== Bibliography ==
- 1967 Ants from Close-up (with L. Hugh Newman)
- 1968 Bees from Close-up
- 1971 Looking at Nature
- 1975 Borne on the Wind (The extraordinary world of insect flight)
- 1982 Caught in Motion (high-speed nature photography)
- 1983 Split Second
- 1986 The Secret Life of an Oakwood
- 1988 Secret Lives
- 1989 At the Water's Edge
- 1990 Vanishing Paradise with George Bernard (life in a tropical rainforest)
- 1992 The Secret Life of Garden
- 1999 The Miracle of Flight (the evolution and mechanism of flight)
- 1999 Secret Worlds
- 2008 Spiders: Ultimate Predators
- 2017 My Wood

== Awards ==
- Hood Medal, Royal Photographic Society, 1971
- Progress Medal and Honorary Fellowship of the Royal Photographic Society, 1977
- Fritz Steiniger Prize, Gesellschaft Deutscher Tierfotografen (Society of German Wildlife Photographers), 2015

== Exhibitions ==
- The Photographers' Gallery, London, 1973
- How We Are: Photographing Britain, Tate Britain, London, 2007
- Montier-en-Der festival, France, 2009
