= Folk Devils =

1980s English post-punk ensemble

- Origin: London, England
- Genre: Post punk
- Years active: 1983–1987 2016 - to-date
- Label: Situation 2
- Members: Kris Jozajtis; Mark Whiteley; Nick Clift; David Hodgson
- Past members: Ian Lowery; Alan Cole; Kris Jozajtis; Mark Whiteley; John Hamilton; Rob Downs; Nick Clift; Saul Taylor
- Website: http://www.folkdevils.co.uk

Folk Devils are an English 1980s post-punk ensemble born of the Notting Hill, West London music scene.

== History ==
Founding member Ian Lowery had previously been the original singer in late 1970s punk rock band The Wall and then signed to Killing Joke's Malicious Damage label as leader of the group Ski Patrol. Politics and the general tensions that seemed endemic to the Killing Joke scene led Ian to leave Ski Patrol and recruit long-time friend of Jaz Coleman - Alan Cole on drums, Kris Jozajtis on guitar (now Dr Kris Jozajtis at Greenfaulds High School) and Mark Whiteley, from Wales, on bass to form another group, Folk Devils, in 1983. Mark had been active in both the London and Welsh music scene. He worked with Anrhefn, Wales' seminal punk band and with the ill-fated Hack Hack on the album Despite Amputations. He left the band midway through a gig at The Fridge in Brixton unhappy with the band, their label (Shout Records), and musical direction. A fight ensued and Mark became a Folk Devil.

The sound was a bastardised blend of punk, blues, and amphetamine fuelled angst with the music often walking a fine line between a patchwork of brilliant musicianship and violence. The political and ideological canvass for Folk Devils was the miners strike, Thatcher's Britain, mass unemployment and the flooding of Britain's streets with heroin and despair. Both Mark and Ray Gange were to become deeply, almost fatally, involved in the early 80s drug scene.

Initially managed by Ray Gange, star of The Clash's film Rude Boy, the Folk Devils first single "Hank Turns Blue" recorded for £180 (allegedly the bands combined dole money) and released on the label Ganges Records and distributed through Rough Trade resided at number three in the indie charts for six weeks being kept off the top spot only by New Order and Depeche Mode.

Three Peel sessions followed in quick succession. Subsequent recordings were critically acclaimed and musicians such as Jason Pierce of Spiritualized still regard the Folk Devils as a highly influential musical force. Having recorded the Beautiful Monster E.P. (their final release on Ganges Records) in 1985 with 'punk' producer and IRS stalwart Richard Mazda and the 1986 Fire and Chrome EP which was well received throughout Europe, chemicals and chaos finally caused the band to disintegrate as their first and only album Goodnight Irony was released by Situation Two. Folk Devils, as Brian Taylor of Killing Joke's management, said at the time, "were a force of nature live and were never quite able to capture that ferocity on record". Ian Lowery died in 2001 having continued to work throughout the late '80s and the early '90s with Nigel Pulsford of Bush on the King Blank project and the Ian Lowery Group. Mark Whiteley went on to work with a variety of bands including Shredder (1994), Big Black Cloud (1995–1997) and Subliminal (1997–2001). Shredder were formed in Dartmoor prison in 1993 and on Mark's release in 1994 were invited to tour with The Stranglers.

In 2001, following Ian's death and three years of studio work with the Subliminal Project, Mark decided to change direction. Like Kris, Mark pursued an academic career and became a criminological researcher and tutor at Cardiff University. He worked on a study on heroin use in Wales and became a regular contributor to debates on TV and radio. In May 2009 he worked with the BBC on a Week In Week Out documentary exploring the heroin scene in Wales with John Cale.

In November 2015, a digital-only release album entitled The Best Protection and the BBC Sessions was made available. And, in September 2016 a collected works album entitled Beautiful Monsters was released on the Optic Nerve label and the band resurfaced to play live with a line-up including David Hodgson (vocals), Mark Whiteley (bass), Kris Jozajtis (guitar), Nick Clift (guitar) and John Hamilton (drums). Several gigs were arranged for July 2017 and the band have released long-overdue new material (Forever EP) and a live recording of their gig in March 2024 at the 100 club (BrokenHeads).

== Discography ==
Chart placings shown are from the UK Indie Chart.

=== Singles ===
- "Hank Turns Blue" (1984) Ganges (no. 9)
- "Beautiful Monster" (1984) Ganges (no. 4)
- Fire & Chrome EP (1985) Karbon (no. 10)
- "It Drags On" (1985) (withdrawn)
- "The Best Protection" (1987) Situation 2 (no. 22)

=== Albums ===
- Goodnight Irony (1987) Situation 2
- The Best Protection and the BBC Sessions (2015) Beggars Banquet (digital only)
- Beautiful Monsters (2016) Optic Nerve
