= The Carpettes =

English punk rock band

- Origin: Houghton-le-Spring, Tyne and Wear, England
- Genres: Punk rock, power pop
- Years active: 1977–1981, 1996–present
- Labels: Small Wonder, Beggars Banquet
- Members: George Maddison; Jimmy Devlin
- Past members: Neil Thompson; Paul Thompson; Kevin Heard; Tim Wilder; Simon Smith; Jim Cosgrove

The Carpettes are an English punk rock band from Houghton-le-Spring, Tyne and Wear, England, formed in 1977, who released two albums on Beggars Banquet Records and recorded two Peel sessions. They split up in 1981, but reformed in 1996.

== History ==
The band was formed in 1977 by Neil Thompson (vocals, guitar), George Maddison (bass), and Kevin Heard (drums) (all three had played together since 1974 in Brown Sugar), The band's first release, the Radio Wunderbar EP, released on the Walthamstow-based indie label Small Wonder. The band named their follow-up single "Small Wonder" in the label's honour. They recorded two sessions for John Peel's BBC Radio 1 show in 1978, however between these two sessions, Kevin Heard was to be replaced by former Young Bucks drummer Tim Wilder. In 1979, they signed to Beggars Banquet Records, who issued their debut album, Frustration Paradise, towards the end of that year. A second album followed in 1980, with a final single released in December that year, before the band split up in June 1981 after war drove them apart.

The band reunited in 1996 to perform at the first Holidays in the Sun festival, with Thompson and Maddison joined by Thompson's brother Paul. This led to a permanent reunion and the release of a new album in 2002, Fair Play to 'Em. In 2005 Neil Thompson left the band and was replaced with Jimmy Devlin, a member of the Glasgow-based Just Another Dream. A final album was recorded featuring Paul Thompson playing drums on several tracks and another Glaswegian, Jim Cosgrove on the rest of the album. This was released on the Texas-based NDN Record label followed by a tour of Germany.

In 2009, Maddison and Devlin collaborated to record three new Carpettes songs, "When I`m Gone", "The Only Way to Be" and a cover of the Tom Waits song "Hold On" which were made available online.

In mid 2011, The Carpettes toured the US for the first time supported by Houston-based band The Shadow, led by Henrik Poulsen. They covered 4000 miles and did 12 shows in Houston, Austin, San Antonio, El Paso, Las Vegas, San Francisco, Los Angeles, San Diego and Phoenix.

In August 2026 The classic line up from the first two albums featuring Neil Thompson on guitar, George Maddison on Bass and Tim Wilder on Drums are getting together to play the Rebellion festival in Blackpool.

== Discography ==
=== Albums ===
- Frustration Paradise (1979) Beggars Banquet
- Fight Amongst Yourselves (1980) Beggars Banquet table
- Fair Play to 'Em (2002) DIW
- Live at Last – Tokyo 2003 (2004) Last Years Youth Records
- The Carpettes (2005) NDN

Compilations

- The Early Years (1997) Overground
- The Best of The Carpettes (2000) Anagram
- Frustration Paradise/Fight Amongst Yourselves (2000) Captain Oi!
- Small Wonders (2003) Last Years Youth Records

=== Singles ===
- Radio Wunderbar EP (1977) Small Wonder
- "Small Wonder" (1978) Small Wonder
- "I Don't Mean It" (1979) Beggars Banquet
- "Johnny Won't Hurt You" (1980) Beggars Banquet
- "Nothing Ever Changes" (1980) Beggars Banquet
- "The Last Lone Ranger" (1980) Beggars Banquet
- "It Doesn't Matter" (2002) DIW
- "No Chance" (2004) Last Years Youth Records
- 80's Demos EP (2007) SnapsMusic
