= Small Wonder Records =

British independent record label

- Founded: 1977
- Founder: Pete and Mari Stennett
- Defunct: 1988
- Genre: Punk, post-punk
- Country of origin: United Kingdom
- Location: London, England

Small Wonder Records was a British independent record label owned and managed by Pete and Mari Stennett, that specialised in releasing records by punk rock and post-punk bands. It operated out of a record shop of the same name at 162 Hoe Street, Walthamstow, London. Artists to have released on the label include Bauhaus, Crass, the Cure, the Cravats, Patrik Fitzgerald, Puncture, Cockney Rejects, the Carpettes, Poison Girls and Angelic Upstarts.

The shop and label's logo, as featured on its famous paper bags, was of a well-dressed Edwardian family; the mother was white while the father and vicar were black. The baby in the picture was mixed race and according to Pete Stennett provided him with the inspiration for the name 'Small Wonder'.

== Discography ==
=== Albums ===
- Cravat-1 The Cravats - Cravats in Toytown

=== Singles ===
- Small One Puncture - "Mucky Pup" / "You Can't Rock n Roll in a Council Flat" 7"
- Small Two The Zeros - "Hungry" / "Radio Fun" 7"
- Small Three The Carpettes - How About Me and You 7" (4-track EP)
- Small Four Patrik Fitzgerald - Safety-Pin Stuck in My Heart 7" (6-track EP)
- Small Five Menace - "GLC" / "I'm Civilised" 7"
- Small Six Patrik Fitzgerald - Backstreet Boys 7" (4-track EP)
- Small Seven Leyton Buzzards - "19 & Mad" / "Villain" / "Youthanasia" 7"
- Small Eight Punishment of Luxury - "Puppet Life" / "The Demon" 7"
- Small Nine The Carpettes - "Small Wonder" / "2 NE 1" 7"
- Small Ten Demon Preacher - "Little Miss Perfect" / "Perfect Dub" 7"
- Small Eleven The Cure - "Killing an Arab" / "10.15 Saturday Night" 7" (later re-released on Fiction Records)
- Small Twelve Nicky & the Dots - "Never Been So Stuck" / "Linoleum Walk" 7"
- Small Thirteen The Wall - "New Way" / "Suckers" / "Uniforms" 7"
- Small Fourteen Molesters - "Disco Love" / "Commuter Man" 7"
- Small Fifteen The Cravats - The End 7" (3-track EP)
- Small Sixteen Menace - "Last Year's Youth" / "Carry No Banners" 7"
- Small Seventeen Murder the Disturbed - Genetic Disruption 7" (3-track EP)
- Small Eighteen Molesters - "End of Civilisation" / "Girl Behind the Curtain" 7"
- Small Nineteen Cockney Rejects - "Flares 'n' Slippers" / "Police Car" / "I Wanna Be a Star" 7"
- Small Twenty Fatal Microbes - "Violence Grows" / "Beautiful Pictures" / "Cry Baby" 7"
- Small Twenty-One The Wall - "Exchange" / "Kiss the Mirror" 7"
- Small Twenty-Two English Subtitles - "Time Tunnel" / "Sweat" / "Reconstruction" 7"
- Small Twenty-Three Proles - "Soft Ground" / "SMK" 7"
- Small Twenty-Four The Cravats - "Precinct" / "Who's in Here with Me?" 7"
- Small Twenty-Five The Cravats - "You're Driving Me" / "I Am the Dreg" 7"
- Small Twenty-Six The Cravats - "Off the Beach" / "And the Sun Shone" 7"
- Small Twenty-Seven Anthrax - They've Got It All Wrong 7" (4-track EP)
- Small Twenty-Eight Camera Obscura - "Destitution" / "Race in Athens" 7"
- RT/SW-001 Angelic Upstarts - "Murder of Liddle Towers" / "Police Oppression" 7" (reissue of Angelic Upstarts label press)
- Weeny 1 Patrik Fitzgerald - Paranoid Ward EP 12" 9-track EP, also on 7"
- Weeny 2 Crass - Feeding of the Five Thousand 12" (18-track EP, later reissued on the Crass label)
- Weeny 3 Poison Girls / Fatal Microbes - "Closed Shop" / "Piano Lessons" / "Violence Grows" / "Beautiful Pictures" 12"
- Weeny 4 Poison Girls - Hex 12" (8-track EP, reissued on Crass)
- Teeny 1 Frank Sumatra - Te Deum 12" (4-track EP)
- Teeny 2 Bauhaus - "Bela Lugosi's Dead" / "Boys" / "Dark Entries" (demo) 12" (white vinyl, 5,000 only - reissued many times)

== See also ==
- List of record labels
