= L. Hugh Newman =

British entomologist, author and broadcaster

L. Hugh Newman

Leonard Hugh Newman (3 February 1909 - 23 January 1993) was a British entomologist, author and broadcaster. He wrote many popular books on insects, especially butterflies and moths. With Peter Scott and James Fisher, he was a resident member of the team who presented "Nature Parliament" on BBC radio's Children's Hour in the 1950s. He ran a butterfly farm in Kent (which he inherited from his father), supplying among others Sir Winston Churchill, who bought many butterflies for his house at Chartwell. A collection of Newman's entomological photographs is held by the library of the Natural History Museum in London.

== Bibliography (incomplete) ==
- Talking of butterflies, moths and other fascinating insects (1946)
- Butterfly haunts (1948)
- British moths and their haunts (1949)
- Butterflies on the wing (1949)
- Moths on the wing (1950)
- Stand & stare (1950) with W. J. C. Murray
- Transformations of butterflies and moths (1952)
- Nature parliament: A book of the broadcasts (1952) with James Fisher and Peter Scott
- Linger and look (1952)
- Nature's way : questions and answers on animal behaviour (1952) with W. J. C. Murray
- How's your pet? (1953)
- The observer's book of common British insects and spiders (1953)
- Butterfly farmer (1953)
- Butterflies of the fields and lanes, hills and heathland (1954)
- Garden and woodland butterflies (1954)
- Wander and watch (1954) with W. J. C. Murray
- Butterflies of day and night : a book of beautiful butterflies and magnificent moths (1954)
- Instructions to young naturalists (1956) with Maxwell Knight and W. E. Swinton
- Looking at butterflies (1959)
- Hawk-moths of Great Britain and Europe (1965)
- Man and insects (1965)
- Living with butterflies (1967) His 1967 book offers anecdotes of the butterfly farm and its doings in a conversational, informative mode, making the practicalities and adventures of his life and times memorable. Rich with natural history, it is a treasure not only for the entomological reader, but anyone who has a love of the outdoors and the issues of ecological preservation that face us all.
- Create a butterfly garden (1967), with Moira Savonius
- Ants from close up (1968), with Stephen Dalton
- The complete British butterflies in colour (1968)
