= Fatal Microbes =

English punk rock band

- Origin: England
- Genres: Punk rock, post-punk
- Years active: 1978–1979
- Labels: Small Wonder, XNTRIX
- Past members: Honey Bane; Gem Stone; Pete Fender; Scotty Barker; It

Fatal Microbes were an English punk rock band formed in 1978. The main line-up of the band consisted of Honey Bane on vocals, Gem Stone on drums, Pete Fender on guitar and Scotty Barker on bass.

The band's name is regarded as a reference to the theme of disgust and toxicity, explored and embraced by many punk rock acts in the late 1970s and early 1980.

== History ==
In 1979 Small Wonder and XNTRIX Records co-released a split 12-inch EP entitled "Violence Grows", which also featured the Epping-based Poison Girls (whose singer, Vi Subversa, was also mother to Gem Stone and Pete Fender). In the same year Fatal Microbes released a 7-inch single featuring "Violence Grows" on the punk rock record label Small Wonder Records. The single was championed by British DJ and radio presenter John Peel.

Honey Bane later had a career as a solo artist, a film and stage actress and a model. Pete Fender subsequently went on to form Rubella Ballet with Gem Stone (bass) and Sid Ation (drums). Fender later released a 7-inch EP, "Four Formulas", under his own name on XNTRIX records. Fender and 'It' had formed the band Punktuation in 1977. With an average age of 13 years, they were amongst the youngest punk bands in the country at the time. Scott Barker went on to become a founding member of the legendary 'Old Reenies' (sometimes spelt 'Ol Rene's') with former Sods front man Kevin Jones and former No Warning guitarist Martin Brown. Scott Barker now lives in Spain and continues to perform.

The band's songs were included in the compilation album for Rip It Up and Start Again compilation released in 2006 through V2 Records.

== Former members ==
Main line-up

- Honey Bane – vocals
- Gem Stone (Gemma Sansom) – drums
- Pete Fender (Dan Sansom) – guitar
- Scotty Boy Barker (Scott Barker) – bass

Other former members

- It (Quentin North) – bass

== Discography ==
Singles

- "Violence Grows" (1979; split single with Poison Girls)
- "Violence Grows b/w Beautiful Pictures + Cry Baby" (Small Wonder Records 1979)
