= Vi Subversa =

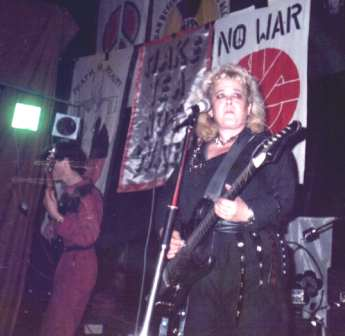
- Subversa performing in 1982

Background information
- Born: 20 June 1935; London, England, United Kingdom
- Died: 19 February 2016 (aged 80)
- Genres: Anarcho punk
- Occupations: Musician, singer
- Instruments: Vocals, guitar
- Years active: 1975–2016
- Labels: Crass, XNTrix, Cooking Vinyl

Frances Sokolov (20 June 1935 – 19 February 2016), better known by her stage name Vi Subversa, was the lead singer, lyricist and rhythm guitarist of British anarcho-punk band Poison Girls.

== Biography ==
Subversa was born of Ashkenazi Jewish parents. She spent two years in Israel in the late 1950s working in a ceramic pottery in Beersheba under Nehemia Azaz, before returning to the United Kingdom. She had two children, Pete Fender (born Daniel Sansom, 1964) and Gem Stone (born Gemma Sansom, 1967), who both became members of the punk bands Fatal Microbes and Rubella Ballet.

Subversa's first public performance was at The Body Show at Sussex University in 1975. In 1979, at 44 years old and a mother of two, she released her first single with the Poison Girls. Her lyrics were written from a radical feminist punk perspective.

She is featured in the documentary film She's a Punk Rocker.

Subversa's last musical venture was with the cabaret trio Vi Subversa's Naughty Thoughts, which she formed with Michael Coates and Judy Bayley. She played her final live performance with Naughty Thoughts at Brighton's Green Door Store on 5 December 2015, with The Cravats.

Subversa's son Pete Fender announced on Facebook on 19 February 2016 that she had died, following a short illness.
