= Poison Girls =

English anarcho-punk band

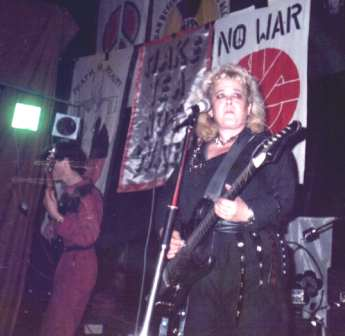
- Poison Girls performing at the squatted Zig Zag Club in London, 18 December 1982

Background information
- Origin: Brighton, England
- Genre: Anarcho-punk
- Years active: 1976–1987
- Labels: Crass Records; X-N-Trix Records
- Past members: See members section

The Poison Girls were an English anarcho-punk band from Brighton. The singer/guitarist, Vi Subversa, was a middle-aged mother of two at the band's inception, and wrote songs that explored sexuality and gender roles, often from an anarchist perspective. The original Poison Girls line-up also included: Lance D'Boyle (drums); Richard Famous (guitar/vocals); Nil (tapes/bass/electric violin); and Bernhardt Rebours (bass/synthesiser/piano).

== History ==
Poison Girls formed in Brighton in 1976, before moving to Burleigh House in Essex, near to Dial House, the home of fellow anarchist band Crass, with whom they worked closely for a number of years, playing over 100 gigs with the band. In 1979 they contributed to the revival of the peace movement by playing a number of benefit gigs with Crass and paying for the production of the first CND badges since CND's heyday. Again in 1979, and again with Crass, they proved influential to the establishment of the short lived Wapping Autonomy Centre by contributing the track Persons Unknown to a split single with Crass (who contributed Bloody Revolutions) and raising over £10,000. Their song Bully Boys, an attack on violent machismo led to the band being attacked by members of the National Front.

In July 1981, a gig in Perth with Crass turned into a riot when National Front sympathisers interrupted it. Violence broke out and the bands stopped the show repeatedly. A recording of the concert was later released by Pomona Records.

The band set up the label X-N-Trix alongside a publishing arm for the Impossible Dream magazine and recording studios for other artists. Though their last studio recording to date was in 1985, a number of Poison Girls compilations have since been released, and their songs frequently appear on punk anthologies.

Poison Girls were involved with the production of Aids – The Musical, through a company called The Lenya Hobnoobs Theatre Company. They did another show called Mother Russia was a Lesbian in 1992, and reunited for a show at the London Astoria II in 1995, celebrating the 60th birthday of Vi Subversa. Currently, Richard Famous works as a painter and decorator. The pair performed as That Famous Subversa, until Subversa's death in February 2016.

== Members ==
- Vi Subversa - vocals/guitar
- Richard Famous - guitar/vocals
- Lance d’Boyle (Gary Lance Robins) - drums/backing vocals (1976–84)
- Bella Donna - bass (1976–77)
- Pete Fender - bass (1978, 1984)
- Scott Barker - bass (1978)
- Bernhardt Rebours - bass/synth/piano/backing vocals (1979–81)
- Nil - tapes.(1979–1981), electric violin and Bass (1980–1995)
- Chris Grace - bass (1982–83)
- Mark Dunn - bass (1983–84)
- Cynth Ethics (Sian Daniels) - synth/vocals (1983–85)
- Martin Heath - bass (1984)
- Max Vol - bass (1984–87)
- Agent Orange - drums (1984–87)
- Andy Demetriou - bass (1989–89)

== Discography ==
=== Albums ===
- (1979) Hex (EP - X-N-Trix Records, re-released in 1980 on Crass Records)
- (1980) Chappaquiddick Bridge (plus "A Statement" flexi disc - Crass Records)
- (1982) Where's the Pleasure? (X-N-Trix Records)
- (1985) Songs of Praise (features cover artwork by Clifford Harper - X-N-Trix Records)

=== Live ===
- (1981) Total Exposure (X-N-Trix Records)

=== Singles ===
- (1979) "Closed Shop" / "Piano Lessons" (split 12" single with Fatal Microbes - X-N-Trix Records / Small Wonder Records)
- (1980) "Persons Unknown" (joint single with Crass as a benefit to raise funds to start an Anarchist Centre - Crass Records)
- (1980) "Bully Boys" / "Pretty Polly" (flexi disc free with fanzine In The City #15)
- (1980) "All Systems Go!" (7" - Crass Records)
- (1983) "Are You Happy Now?" / "White Cream Dream" (12" - Illuminated Records)
- (1983) "One Good Reason" (7" - Illuminated Records)
- (1984) "I'm Not A Real Woman" (12" - X-N-Trix Records)
- (1985) "The Price of Grain and the Price of Blood" (12" - Upright Records)

=== Compilations ===
- (1984) 7 Year Scratch (double compilation from previous releases plus live material - X-N-Trix Records)
- (1984) Who? What? Why? When? Where? (song "The Offending Article" included on compilation by Conflict, Mortarhate Records). The album had little circulation on its initial release, but gained greater currency when re-released in 2003.
- (1995) Statement - The Complete Recordings (4 CD boxed set with accompanying lyric and history booklets - Cooking Vinyl)
- (1995) Real Woman (Cooking Vinyl Records)
- (1997) Their Finest Moments (Nectar Masters Records)
- (1998) Poisonous (Recall 2 cd Records)
- (2025) Persons Unknown: The Complete Recorded History (7 CD boxed set with lyric and history booklet - PM Press, Cooking Vinyl, Free Dirt, Active Distribution)
