= Winter (Amebix song) =

Single by Amebix
- B-side: "Beginning of the End"
- Released: 1983
- Genre: Crust punk
- Length: 5:32
- Label: Spiderleg Records

Amebix singles chronology
"Who's the Enemy" (1981)	"Winter" (1983)	"No Sanctuary" (1984)

"Winter" is the debut single and second overall release by the British crust punk band Amebix, released during their original run in 1983 on Spiderleg Records, with "Beginning of the End" as the B-side.

The single reached number 18 on the UK Indie Chart, staying on the chart for 7 weeks.

The single was re-released as part of the compilation No Sanctuary: The Spiderleg Recordings in 2008 on Alternative Tentacles. The A-side was also rerecorded by the reformed band in 2009, as a part of the Redux EP.

"Winter" was included in NME's 'Ultimate Summer Playlist', having been chosen by Pink Eyes of Fucked Up.

== Track listing ==
A-side

1. "Winter" – 5:32

B-side

1. "Beginning of the End" – 3:34

== Personnel ==
- The Baron – vocals, bass
- Stig – guitar
- Virus – drums
