= Theta (disambiguation) =

Theta (Θ or θ) is the eighth letter of the Greek alphabet.

Theta may also refer to:

== Science and mathematics ==
- Θ (set theory), the least ordinal α such that there is no surjection from the reals onto α
- Theta (gastropod), a genus of sea snails
- Theta functions, special functions of several complex variables
- Theta meson, a hypothetical meson in quantum physics
- Theta representation, a particular representation of the Heisenberg group of quantum mechanics
- Theta wave, in biology
- Theta*, a pathfinding algorithm in computer science
- $f = \Theta(g)$, a Bachmann–Landau notation in computational complexity theory
- The denotation for potential temperature
- A common symbol for a variable of the measure of an angle
- SARS-CoV-2 Theta variant, one of the variants of SARS-CoV-2, the virus that causes COVID-19

== Business ==
- GM Theta platform, an automobile platform of General Motors
- Theta Networks a telecommunications software company

== Music ==
- Theta (musician), a Greek musician
- Theta (album), by Brymo, 2022

== Other uses ==
- Theta (finance), in quantitative finance, a first order derivative of an option pricing formula versus time
- Theta role, in linguistics
- Theta, Gauteng, a suburb of Johannesburg, South Africa
- An IPA symbol for voiceless dental fricative
- Hyundai Theta engine a four cylinder gasoline engine made by Hyundai.
- Kappa Alpha Theta, a North American collegiate sorority

== See also ==
- Thetan, in Scientology, the spirit or soul
