= Evolution (Subhumans EP) =

EP by Subhumans
- Released: 1983
- Recorded: 29 January 1983
- Genre: Punk rock
- Label: Bluurg Records
- Producer: Subhumans

Subhumans chronology
The Day The Country Died (1982)	Evolution (1983)	Time Flies... But Aeroplanes Crash (1983)

Evolution is the fourth EP released by the anarcho-punk band Subhumans. It was also the band's first vinyl release on their own label, Bluurg Records (bar the "Wessex '82" split EP). The EP was also released as part of the 1985 "EP-LP" compilation, which compiles the band's first four EP's onto a single record.

== Track listing ==
1. "Evolution"

2. "So Much Money"

3. "Germ"

4. "Not Me"

5. “Song No.35” (untitled bonus track on the original record; later to be named on the “Unfinished Business” EP)

== Personnel ==
- Dick Lucas - vocals
- Bruce - guitar
- Grant - bass
- Trotsky - drums
- Nick Lant - cover artwork
- John Loder - engineer
