= Redux =

Redux may refer to:

== Arts and media ==
- Redux (literary term), an adjective meaning "brought back, restored" used in literature, film and video game titles
- "Redux" (The X-Files), a two-part episode of The X-Files
- "Redux" (Homeland), an episode of Homeland
- Redux (album), an album by Adam Ant
- Redux (EP), an EP by Amebix
- Redux: Dark Matters, a Dreamcast video game subsequently released online
- Redux Redux, a 2025 American science fiction film

== Other uses ==
- Redux (adhesive), an aircraft adhesive
- Redux (drug), a weight-loss drug withdrawn in 1997
- Redux (software), a JavaScript library for managing state of user interfaces

== See also ==
- Redus, surname
- Remix
- Redox
