= Shilpa Narayan =

American singer-songwriter

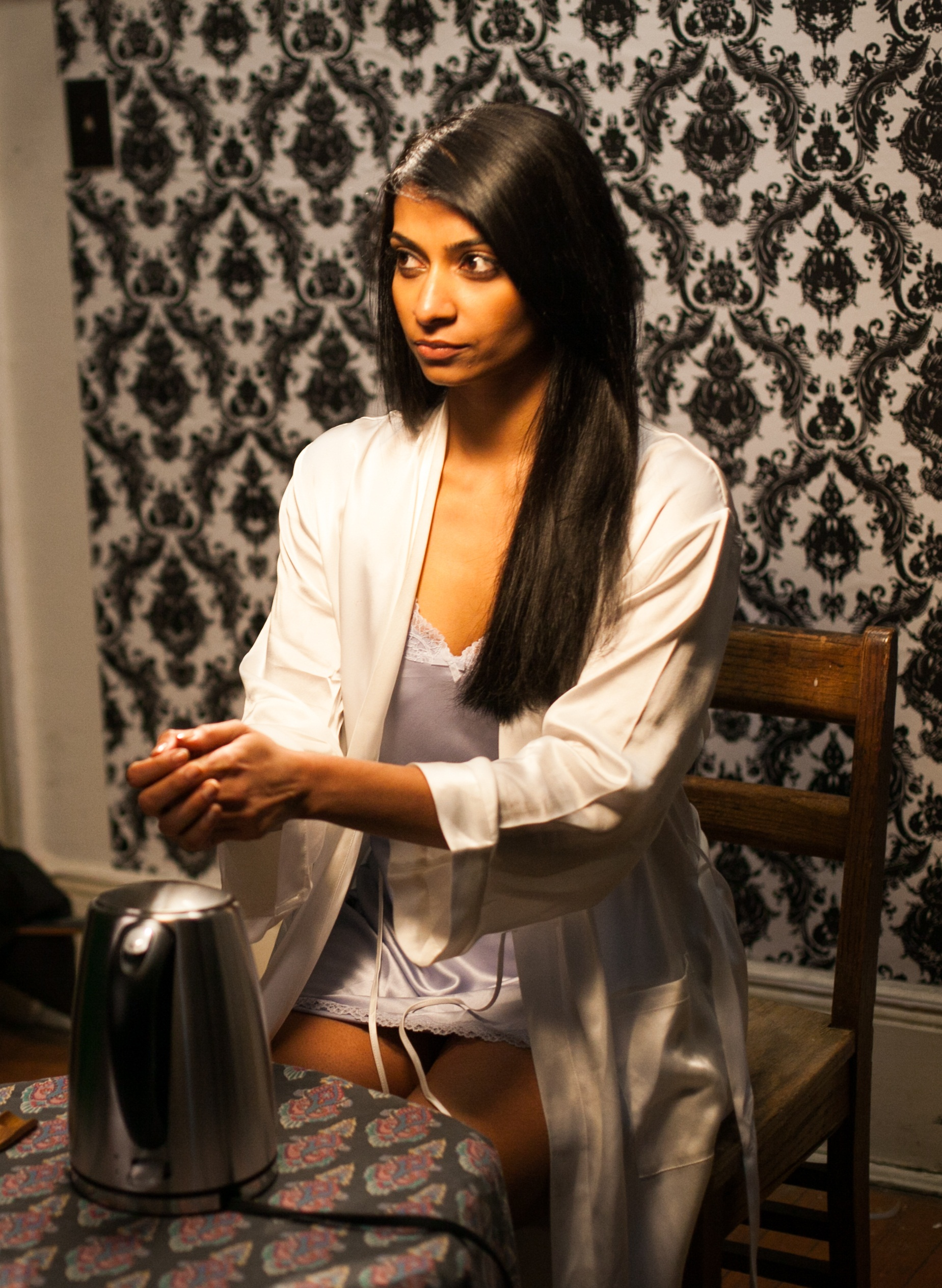
- Shilpa Narayan

Background information
- Born: Atlanta, Georgia, US�
- Origin: New York City
- Genres: Pop, Electro, EDM, Pop rock, RnB
- Occupation: Singer-songwriter
- Years active: 2012–present
- Website: shilpanarayan.com

Shilpa Narayan is a pop/R&B singer-songwriter based in New York City. She released her debut album Stand Alone in 2012, along with the singles Stand Alone and Change Your Mind. She has worked with hip-hop artists such as Waka Flocka, Wale and Culture Shock, and performed at New York Fashion Week in 2010.

== Early life ==
Shilpa Narayan was born in Raleigh, North Carolina, to a journalist mother and engineer father, and also lived in Atlanta, Georgia, during her childhood. She studied business and marketing at Georgia Tech. She began posting videos of herself singing on YouTube, and subsequently moved to New York City. She won an open mic contest at Don Hills, which helped her obtain a small management deal, and introduced her to various producers and musicians in the city.

== Career ==
Narayan started off her career by releasing her debut album Stand Alone in 2012. In 2013 she collaborated with MySpace Records to release her debut single Renegade, an international hit based around an electro/tribal dance beat.

In 2015, she partnered with Yahoo! Music to release her second album Through Haze which included the tracks "Baby Go Home" and "Pinch Me".

Narayan has performed on several music channels and portals, including MTV, VH1, BBC Radio, Yahoo! Music, MTV Indies, AOL Music, Vibe Magazine, Okayplayer, RyanSeacrest.com, Channel One News, ArtistDirect and Carson Daly's The Voice. She performed at the Indian Film Festival in New York City in 2016, and at Diwali in Times Square in 2013 and 2016. She has also performed in Canada and China.

== Discography ==
- Stand Alone (2012)
- Renegade (2013)
- Through Haze (2015)
