= Time Flies... but Aeroplanes Crash =

Time Flies...but Aeroplanes Crash

EP by Subhumans
- Released: October 1983
- Recorded: 5/10 August 1983 (tracks 1–3, 5 and 8), 29 July 1983 (tracks 4, 6 and 7)
- Genre: Punk rock, anarcho-punk
- Length: 19:28
- Label: Bluurg Records
- Producer: Subhumans

Subhumans chronology
Evolution (1983)	Time Flies...but Aeroplanes Crash (1983)	From the Cradle to the Grave (1984)

Time Flies...but Aeroplanes Crash is the fifth EP by the anarcho-punk band Subhumans. Unlike their previous EP's, "Time Flies..." was released as a 12" record, and features both live and studio tracks - the live tracks being taken from an aborted live album, recorded at Feltham Football Club. The record also features the piano-based song "Susan", written by Steve Hamilton - a friend of vocalist Dick.

In 1990, this EP, along with the band's sixth EP "Rats" was compiled as the "Time Flies + Rats" record, therefore collecting all of the band's remaining EP's (bar 1998's "Unfinished Business") that weren't featured on the "EP-LP" compilation.

It was rated two stars by AllMusic.

== Track listing ==
1. "Get Out of My Way"
2. "First Aid"
3. "Word Factory"
4. "People are Scared" (Live)
5. "Susan"
6. "I Don't Wanna Die" (Live)
7. "Everyday Life" (Live)
8. "Work. Rest. Play. Die"

== Further track information ==
Both "Get Out of My Way" and "First Aid" were songs originally written by the Stupid Humans - the band that guitarist Bruce (plus original Subhumans drummer Andy) played in before the band's formation.

== Personnel ==
- Dick Lucas - vocals, piano
- Bruce - guitar
- Grant Jackson - bass
- Trotsky - drums
- Steve Collinson - engineer
- Steve Hamilton - lyrics to "Susan"
