= Subhumans (British band) =

British anarcho-punk band

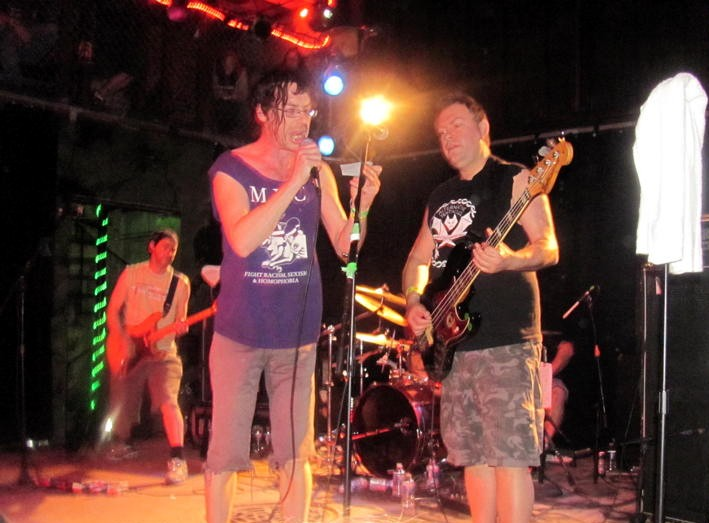
- Subhumans performing in 2011

Background information
- Origin: Warminster, Wiltshire, England
- Genres: Anarcho-punk, hardcore punk
- Years active: 1980–1985, 1991, 1998; 2004–present
- Labels: Spiderleg, Bluurg
- Members: Dick Lucas; Bruce Treasure; Phil Bryant; Trotsky
- Past members: Steve Lucas; Herb; Grant Jackson; Andy Gale

Subhumans are an English/UK punk rock band formed in the Warminster and Melksham areas of Wiltshire in 1980. Singer Dick Lucas had formerly been in another local band, the Mental, and other members had been in The Stupid Humans. The band's musical style is typically classified as hardcore punk or anarcho-punk.

== History ==
The band was formed in 1980, guitarist Bruce and drummer Andy were accompanied by original bassist Grant, previously from the band Audio Torture. The band was initially known as Superhumans due to insistence from Bruce's mother but changed their name to Subhumans when Dick joined the band later the same year. By the end of 1980, drummer Andy had left and was replaced by Trotsky.

The band released a demo in 1981. It was heard by members of the band Flux of Pink Indians, after being sent to them by Graham Burnett of the New Crimes fanzine, and the band were so impressed that they offered Subhumans a record release on their newly founded label Spiderleg Records. The group's debut EP, Demolition War, subsequently appeared on Spiderleg Records in December 1981.

Subhumans released two more EPs in 1982, Reasons for Existence and Religious Wars, as well as founding their record label, Bluurg Records. Although initially focused on releasing cassette recordings, the label produced its first vinyl release with the "Wessex '82" EP, which featured one track each by the Subhumans ("No Thanks"), The Pagans, Organised Chaos, and The A-Heads.

The band's first LP, The Day The Country Died was released in 1982 on Spiderleg Records. Generally considered a classic of the anarcho-punk era, it was followed shortly after by the Evolution EP, which was also the band's first record (bar the "Wessex '82" split) to be released on their own label. The band released Time Flies... But Aeroplanes Crash later that same year, a 12" EP consisting of both studio and live tracks - the live tracks taken from an aborted live album. Towards the end of the year, original bassist Grant left the band (shortly before the recording sessions for their second album) and was replaced by Phil of the Pagans. (Bruce Treasure, Andy Gale, Grant Jackson, Trotsky and Phil Bryant all attended Kingdown Comprehensive School in Warminster, England).

The following year, the band released their second album, From the Cradle to the Grave. The release demonstrated a notable musical development for the band, particularly with the title track - a progressive piece that took up the album's entire second side and ran for almost 17 minutes. It was followed by one last EP, Rats, in January 1985, and the EP-LP release - a compilation album comprising the band's first four EPs.

Subhumans broke up at the end of 1985, after recording their third album Worlds Apart, with musical differences being cited as the main reason for the split. A final 12" record (1986's 29:29 Split Vision) was also recorded and released posthumously and demonstrated just how far the band's musical leanings had altered from their initial hardcore punk stylings. Lucas subsequently joined Culture Shock in 1986 and then formed the political ska punk band Citizen Fish in 1990. A second Subhumans compilation album was released the same year (Time Flies + Rats), which comprised the two later EPs absent from the EP-LP release.

Subhumans had a brief reunion for a couple of shows in about 1991, and a more comprehensive return in 1998, which included UK and US concerts. This resulted in a semi-permanent return of the band as a touring entity, including at least two major tours of North America in the twenty-first century – the Live in a Dive recording released on Fat Wreck Chords being a product of the second tour recorded at the Showcase Theatre in Corona, CA. The band also recorded and released a new EP, Unfinished Business, in 1998, which consists of previously unreleased songs from the band's original incarnation.

Since then, Subhumans have recorded a new album, Internal Riot, and self-released it on Bluurg Records in September 2007. They toured in Europe throughout 2007, and a month-long U.S. tour began on 24 August that year. They have maintained a live presence ever since.

For nearly a decade, Subhumans continued to make multiple live performances across the UK and the US, and on 13 September 2019, Subhumans released a new album titled Crisis Point, which was the band's first album in 12 years. The album covered several modern-day issues while moving back into the anarcho-punk genre, with its messages and general punk tune in the song.

== Legacy ==
In an interview with The Guardian in 2016, the band was citied along with a number of other British Anarcho-punk bands of the early 80s as being an influence to the American avant-garde metal group Neurosis.

Subhumans have been covered by acts such as Queens of the Stone Age, and MDC. Travis Barker of blink-182 has worn a Subhumans t-shirt in public on multiple occasions. Fat Mike of NOFX has also spoken about his love for Subhumans.

== Discography ==
Studio albums

- The Day the Country Died (1982)
- From the Cradle to the Grave (1984)
- Worlds Apart (1985)
- 29:29 Split Vision (1986)
- Internal Riot (2007)
- Crisis Point (2019)

Extended plays

- Demolition War (1981)
- Reasons for Existence (1982)
- Religious Wars (1982)
- Evolution (1983)
- Time Flies... but Aeroplanes Crash (1983)
- Rats (1984)
- Unfinished Business (1998)

Compilation albums

- Demolition Wars Parts I-III (1981)
- EP-LP (1985)
- Time Flies + Rats (1990)

Live albums

- Football Bootleg: Live in Bristol 2001 (2001)
- Live in a Dive (2004)
- All Gone Live (2007)

=== Miscellaneous ===
- Wessex '82 (split with the Pagans, Organized Chaos and the A Heads, 1982)
- Birmingham Foundry (video, live at Birmingham Foundry, Barn End, 1998)

== Band members ==
Current

- Dick Lucas – lead vocals, piano (1980–present)
- Bruce Treasure – guitar, backing vocals (1980–present)
- Phil Bryant – bass (1983–present)
- Trotsky – drums (1980–present)

Former

- Grant Jackson – bass (1980–1983)
- Andy Gale – drums (1980)

== See also ==
- Citizen Fish
- Punk ideology
