= Neu Smell =

EP by Flux of Pink Indians
- Released: 1981
- Recorded: Southern Studios, London
- Genre: Anarcho-punk
- Length: 9:21
- Label: Crass Records
- Producer: Penny Rimbaud

Flux of Pink Indians chronology
Neu Smell (1981)	Strive To Survive Causing The Least Suffering Possible (1983)

Neu Smell is the debut 7" EP by British anarcho-punk band Flux of Pink Indians, released in 1981 on Crass Records. It is notable for the inclusion of the song "Tube Disaster".

"Tube Disaster" was originally recorded by some members' former band The Epileptics, with lyrics inspired by the 1975 Moorgate tube crash. Drummer Sid Truelove joined the band whilst also a member of Rubella Ballet and explained the origins of "Sick Butchers" and "Background of Malfunction" to The Quietus:

“We were asked to record the single for Crass only a week after I joined the band and we only had one good new song! [...] They had nothing to work with so I decided to donate two songs I had written for Rubella Ballet. Once this was discovered I got into hot water with Zillah [Minx, Rubella Ballet’s vocalist/ Truelove’s partner]. ‘What do you mean you gave them to Flux?!’ I was lost for words when I realised I had given Flux possibly the best two songs we had!”

The original release reached number 2 in the UK Independent Charts.

In 2024 Neu Smell was repressed as 12" single by One Little Independent as part of the "2 By 2 And Back Again" series.

== Track listing ==
=== Pig-Side ===
1. "Neu Smell"
2. "Tube Disaster"
3. "Poem"

=== Bacon-Side ===
1. "Sick Butchers"
2. "Background of Malfunction"

== Personnel ==
- Colsk Latter – vocals
- Derek Birkett – bass
- Andy Smith – guitar
- Neil Puncher – guitar
- Sid Attion (AKA Sid Truelove) – drums
- Eugene Crowley – synthesizer on "Poem"
- Penny Rimbaud – producer
- John Loder – engineer

== Packaging ==
The EP was issued in a six-panel foldout sleeve featuring band photos, lyrics, credits, and artwork. The vinyl includes matrix etchings:

- Side A: ALL ANIMALS ARE EQUAL
- Side B: BUT SOME ARE MORE EQUAL THAN OTHERS

== Legacy ==
Louder Than War noted:

"This single was one of the first really pointed and explicit animal rights focused records from the punk milieu. [...] While the songs shot straight at the emotions, the facts and details on the poster sleeve made more salient arguments to appeal to the thinking side of the brain."

At the age of 18, Napalm Death vocalist Lee Dorrian became a vegetarian after hearing the EP.

In 2003 the U.K. Subs recorded a cover version of "Tube Disasters" for the Angry Songs & Bitter Words compilation album, which was a benefit for the Rape Crisis charity.

In 2009, rap artist Professor Green sampled the bassline from "Tube Disaster" for his single "Hard Night Out".

In 2023 "Tube Disasters" was included on the compilation album Cease & Resist - Sonic Subversion & Anarcho Punk In The UK 1979-1986 released on the Optimo label.

In a primer on Anarcho Punk in The Wire magazine, Louis Pattison stated that:

"Neu Smell is perhaps the quintessential anarcho-punk EP, a furious, utterly earnest indictment of a sick society. 'Tube Disasters' [is] bookended with apocalyptic poetry and delivered with a guitar sound that shrieks like cattle bound for the abattoir."
