= Grief (photograph) =

Photo by Dmitry Baltermants (1942)

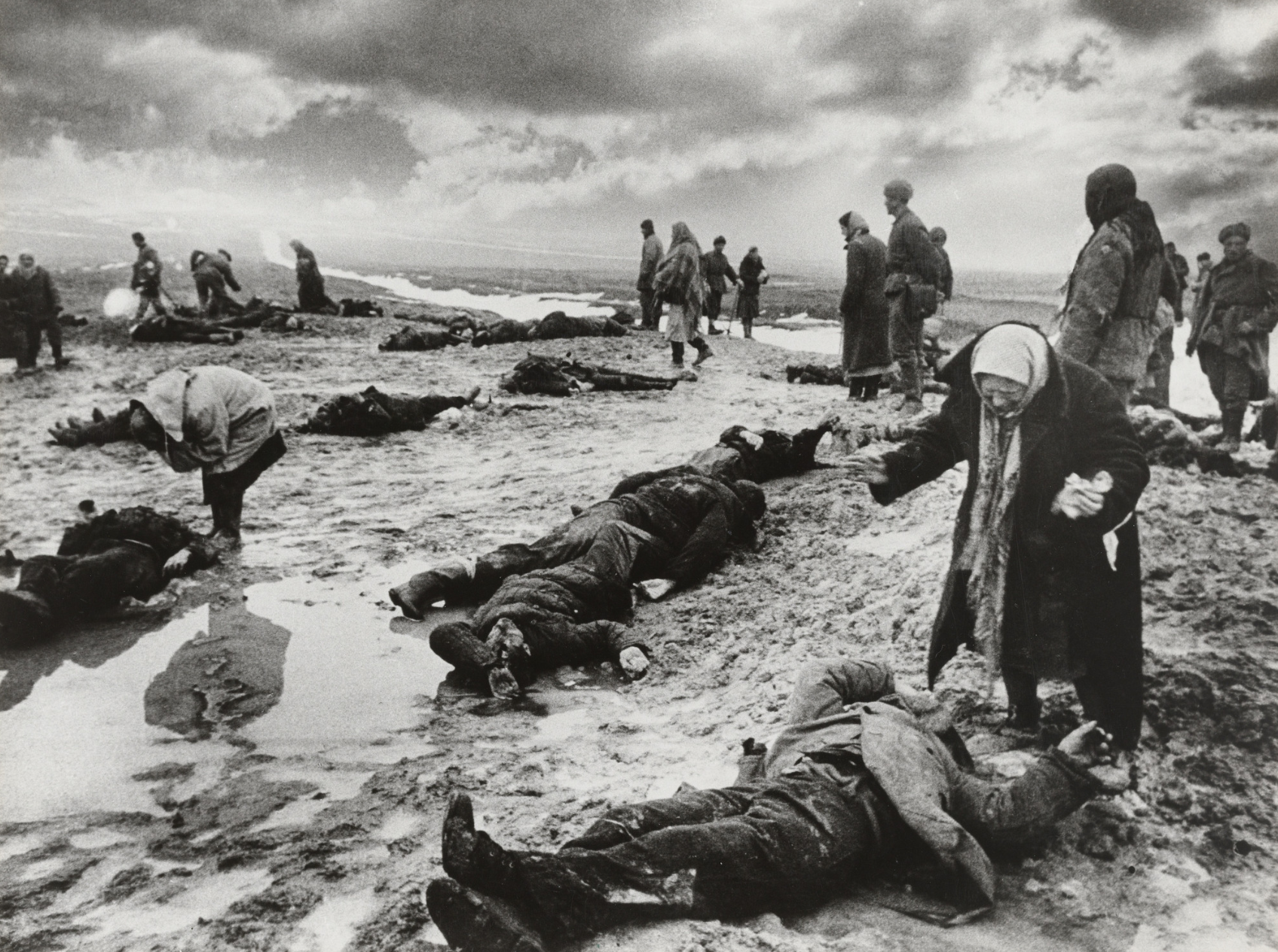
Grief

Grief is a World War II photograph of international fame made by Soviet photographer Dmitry Baltermants in the area of Kerch, Crimea on 2 January 1942. The photograph depicts the site of a massacre of civilians by the Germans: grief-stricken people wander across a field, searching for relatives among the corpses lying in the muddy snow. The history of the photo is detailed in the 2020 book by David Shneer Grief: The Biography of a Holocaust Photograph.

The photo was first published at an exhibition prepared by Italian photographer Caio Mario Garrubba in 1960s. Garrubba found the photo in the archives of Baltermants. Baltermants modified it with the clouds from another photo. In the Soviet Union the photo was published only in 1975.

== In popular culture ==
Grief appeared (cropped and uncredited) on the cover of the album No Sanctuary by British crust punk band Amebix, released in November 1983, and on the cover of a second pressing of the Japanese heavy metal band Dir En Grey album, The Marrow of a Bone.

The photo is on the cover of David Shneer's book about the photograph.
