= No Sanctuary =

No Sanctuary may refer to:

- No Sanctuary (album), an album by Amebix
- "No Sanctuary" (The Walking Dead), an episode of The Walking Dead TV series
