= Religious Wars (EP) =

EP by Subhumans
- Released: 1982
- Recorded: 9 May 1982
- Genre: Anarcho-punk, hardcore punk
- Label: Spiderleg
- Producer: Subhumans

Subhumans chronology
Reasons for Existence (1982)	Religious Wars (1982)	Wessex '82 (1982)

Religious Wars is the third EP by the anarcho-punk band Subhumans. It was released on Spiderleg Records in 1982, and rereleased as part of the EP-LP compilation on Bluurg Records in 1985.

== Track listing ==
1. "Religious Wars"
2. "Love Is..."
3. "It's Gonna Get Worse"
4. "Work Experience"

== Personnel ==
- Dick Lucas - vocals
- Bruce - guitar
- Grant - bass
- Trotsky - drums
- Steve C. - engineer
