= Redux (EP) =

EP by Amebix
- Released: July 2010
- Recorded: 2009
- Label: Profane Existence
- Producer: Roy Mayorga

Amebix chronology
Monolith (1987)	Redux (2010)	Sonic Mass (2011)

Professional ratings
Review scores
Source	Rating
PunkNews.org	4/5 stars

Redux is an EP by the British crust punk band Amebix. It is a three-track studio release with a bonus downloadable live track. The album was recorded in 2009 after original Amebix members Rob and Stig met with drummer Roy Mayorga (Stone Sour, Soulfly, Nausea) to record some songs for a documentary about the band. The first three tracks are re-recordings of older songs while the fourth track was recorded live on their US re-union tour in 2009.

The album was released in CD, vinyl, and digital formats. Both the CD and vinyl versions had the first three songs with a card for a download of the digital version, which included the live bonus track.

== Track list ==
1. "Arise" - originally recorded for the Arise! LP
2. "Winter" - originally recorded for the "Winter" single
3. "Chain Reaction" - originally recorded for the Monolith LP
4. "Progress (Live)" - recorded live in 2009
