= The Day the Country Died =

Studio album by Subhumans
- Released: December 1982
- Recorded: 22 June–26 June 1982 at Pickwick Studios in Corsham, England
- Genre: Anarcho-punk
- Length: 34:56
- Label: Spiderleg
- Producer: Subhumans

Subhumans chronology
| Wessex '82 (1982) | The Day the Country Died (1982) | Evolution (1983) |

Professional ratings
Review scores
| Source | Rating |
|---|---|
| Allmusic | 4/5 stars |

The Day the Country Died is the debut studio album by the English anarcho-punk band Subhumans. It was released in December 1982 through Spiderleg Records. It was recorded in five days in June 1982. The album was later re-released via Bluurg, the band's own record label.

The album is influenced by the novel Nineteen Eighty-Four by George Orwell. The most obvious sign of such an influence is the song "Big Brother"; Big Brother is the dictatorial political leader figure in Orwell's novel. The song revolves around how "Big Brother is watching you", and when Dick Lucas sings "there's a TV in my front room and it's screwing up my head", it is a comparison between the telescreen in the novel which monitored citizens constantly and excessive viewing of mass media. Today, there is a huge amount of video surveillance in the United Kingdom, showing the foresight of this subject matter. Like the novel, the album has dystopian overtones.

It also describes a world ravaged by war, most likely our world which arguably is, this is suggested by track titles such as "Dying World" and "All Gone Dead". The latter contains lyrics like "So long to the world, that's what they said, it's 1984 and it's all gone dead", which can be seen as another reference to Nineteen Eighty-Four.

The Day the Country Died is widely regarded as a classic punk rock album.

== Information ==
Four of the tracks on the album had previously been performed by the Stupid Humans, the band that Bruce was in before forming Subhumans. "All Gone Dead", "Ashtray Dirt", "Killing" and "New Age" all appeared on the Stupid Humans’ 1980 demo tape. The "nihilist" section, between "I Don't Wanna Die" and "No", is from the chorus of an earlier Subhumans track, "Song No. 35".

== Track listing ==
All tracks are written by Subhumans, except where noted.

| No. | Title | Length |
|---|---|---|
| 1. | "All Gone Dead" (written by Bruce Treasure) | 1:56 |
| 2. | "Ashtray Dirt" (written by Treasure) | 1:22 |
| 3. | "Killing" (written by Treasure) | 1:49 |
| 4. | "Minority" | 1:17 |
| 5. | "Mickey Mouse Is Dead" | 2:45 |
| 6. | "Nothing I Can Do" | 2:30 |
| 7. | "Dying World" | 2:57 |
| 8. | "Subvert City" | 4:14 |
| 9. | "Big Brother" | 1:55 |
| 10. | "New Age" (written by Treasure) | 1:49 |
| 11. | "I Don't Wanna Die" | 1:30 |
| 12. | "No" | 1:49 |
| 13. | "Zyklon-B-Movie" | 2:12 |
| 14. | "'Til the Pigs Come Round" | 2:01 |
| 15. | "No More Gigs" | 2:52 |
| 16. | "Black and White" | 3:36 |
| Total length: | | 34:56 |

== Personnel ==
Subhumans

- Dick Lucas – lead vocals
- Bruce Treasure – guitar, backing vocals
- Grant Jackson – bass
- Trotsky – drums

Other

- Subhumans – production
- Steve Collinson – engineering, mixing
- Harvey Birrell – mastering
- Nick Lant – cover art
- Simone S. – photography
