= Strive to Survive Causing Least Suffering Possible =

- Cover of the 1983 LP

Studio album by Flux of Pink Indians
- Released: January 1983
- Genres: Anarcho-punk; Post-punk
- Length: 33:41
- Label: Spiderleg

Flux of Pink Indians chronology
Neu Smell (1981)	Strive to Survive Causing Least Suffering Possible (1983)	The Fucking Cunts Treat Us Like Pricks (1984)

Strive to Survive Causing Least Suffering Possible is the debut album by the anarcho-punk band Flux of Pink Indians. It was released in January 1983 through the band's own label Spiderleg Records.

The album entered the indie album chart at number 10 on 31 January, and reached number 1 on 14 February. It reached number 79 on the official UK album chart.

The album was issued on compact disc through One Little Indian in 1989. It contained all the tracks from the Neu Smell EP as a bonus, though in a different order than the one in which they appear on the EP and mislabelled. The album was repressed on vinyl through Let Them Eat Vinyl in 2008, and a deluxe two-disc LP and three-disc CD editions were issued in 2013 through One Little Indian, containing demos and live recordings.

Professional ratings
Review scores
Source	Rating
The Encyclopedia of Popular Music	3/5 stars
Uncut	8/10 stars
Sounds	4/5 stars
Vive Le Rock	10/10 stars

== Reception ==
A review in Maximum Rocknroll stated:

"I have a hard time finding fault with this album. Once again, if you don’t like your punk political, steer clear, because FLUX is dynamite. The whole LP is a marvelously orchestrated opera of poetic condemnations of our nuclear world that builds up to a climactic musical explosion. The production is superb, and a booklet is included. My copy’s grooves are already worn down.

The 1992 book The Guinness Who's Who of Indie and New Wave Music commented of the album, "Alongside standard thrash numbers were highly perceptive attacks on consumer society. The anti-religious 'Is Anybody There' [sic] was a particularly effective example, using simple but jarring lyrics to emphasize its point."

In 2012 Sean Forbes of the Rough Trade shop (and bands including Hard Skin) told Record Collector magazine that the release was "The most inspiring album of all time. Musically, lyrically, aesthetically and politically spot on. It reminds me of bunking off school on the day of release and going to Small Wonder in Walthamstow to buy it."

A review of a reissue of the album in Uncut magazine in 2013 states: "An extended harangue – even the drumming is hectoring and dogmatic [...] Flux’s conviction is daunting still. [...] Strive To Survive… stands undefeated; three chords and, maybe, the truth."

In 2021, Jeff Walker of Carcass included the record as one of his five favourite punk albums and one of the reasons for him becoming a vegetarian.

== Track listing ==
Side One
No.	Title	Length
1.	"Song for Them"	0:37
2.	"Charity Hilarity"	1:29
3.	"Some of Us Scream, Some of Us Shout"	2:00
4.	"Take Heed"	2:31
5.	"TV Dinners"	4:35
6.	"Tapioca Sunrise"	4:37

Side Two
No.	Title	Length
7.	"Progress"	1:42
8.	"They Lie, We Die"	3:08
9.	"Blinded by Science"	2:37
10.	"Myxomatosis"	2:19
11.	"Is There Anybody There?"	3:50
12.	"The Fun Is Over"	2:16

1989 CD bonus tracks (Neu Smell)
No.	Title	Length
13.	"Sick Butchers"	2:27
14.	"Background of Malfunction"	2:47
15.	"Poem"	0:37
16.	"Tube Disasters"	2:44
17.	"Poem End"	0:44
Total length:		43:00
