= Demolition War =

EP by Subhumans
- Released: December 1981
- Recorded: 8 August 1981
- Genres: Anarcho-punk, hardcore punk
- Length: 15:02
- Label: Spiderleg
- Producers: Steve C., Subhumans

Subhumans chronology
Demolition War (1981)	Reasons for Existence (1982)

Demolition War is the first EP released by the anarcho-punk group Subhumans. It was originally released on Spiderleg Records in 1981, and was also released as part of the EP-LP compilation on Bluurg Records in 1985.

== Track listing ==
No.	Title	Length
1.	"Parasites"	2:37
2.	"Drugs of Youth"	2:00
3.	"Animal"	2:46
4.	"Society"	1:43
5.	"Who's Gonna Fight in the Third World War?"	2:10
6.	"Human Error"	3:46
Total length:		15:02

== Personnel ==
- Dick Lucas - vocals
- Bruce - guitar
- Grant - bass
- Trotsky - drums
- Steve C. - producer
