= Worlds Apart (Subhumans album) =

Studio album by Subhumans
- Released: 1985
- Recorded: 10–16 April 1985
- Genre: Punk rock, anarcho-punk, progressive punk
- Length: 42:43
- Label: Bluurg
- Producer: Subhumans

Subhumans chronology
From the Cradle to the Grave (1983)	Worlds Apart (1985)	EP-LP (1985)

Professional ratings
Review scores
Source	Rating
Allmusic	4/5 stars

Worlds Apart is the third studio album by the English anarcho-punk band Subhumans. It was released shortly after the band's initial demise in 1985.

== Track listing ==
1. "33322" - 1:21
2. "British Disease" - 2:40
3. "Heads of State" - 2:30
4. "Apathy" - 2:43
5. "Fade Away" - 2:55
6. "Businessman" - 2:02
7. "Someone Is Lying" - 4:24
8. "Pigman" - 2:32
9. "Can't Hear the Words" - 1:52
10. "Get to Work on Time" - 3:05
11. "Carry on Laughing" - 3:15
12. "Straightline Thinking" - 2:55
13. "Ex-Teenage Rebel" - 4:40
14. "Powergames" - 3:33
15. "33322" - 1:59
