= Sonic Mass =

Studio album by Amebix
- Released: 23 September 2011
- Recorded: Rock Cottage, Derbyshire; The Lodge Recording Studio, Northampton, United Kingdom
- Genre: Crust punk, heavy metal, post-metal
- Length: 43:30
- Label: Amebix Records
- Producer: Roy Mayorga

Amebix chronology
Redux (2010)	Sonic Mass (2011)

Professional ratings
Review scores
Source	Rating
Punknews.org	4.5/5 stars
Sputnikmusic	4.3/5

Sonic Mass is the fourth studio album by the British crust punk band Amebix, released on 23 September 2011 through the band's own label, Amebix Records. It was also their first full-length album since 1987's Monolith.

An animated music video was made for the track "Knights of the Black Sun"; it was released on 3 June 2011.

== Track listing ==
No.	Title	Length
1.	"Days"	4:05
2.	"Shield Wall"	1:54
3.	"The Messenger"	4:16
4.	"God of the Grain"	4:14
5.	"Visitation"	6:46
6.	"Sonic Mass (Part 1)"	3:37
7.	"Sonic Mass (Part 2)"	3:54
8.	"Here Comes the Wolf"	3:46
9.	"The One"	5:12
10.	"Knights of the Black Sun"	5:46

== Personnel ==
Amebix

- The Baron Rockin von Aphid (Rob Miller) — vocals, bass
- Stig Da Pig (Chris Miller) — guitars
- Roy Mayorga — drums, keyboards

Miscellaneous staff

- Joe Willes — assistant engineer
- Toby Hanson — second engineer
- Roy Mayorga — engineering, mixing, production
- Ted Jensen — mastering
- Fin McAteer — design, art direction, photography
- Andy Lefton — artwork
