= Theta (musician) =

Θ (theta)
- Origin: Drama, Greece/Tromsø, Norway
- Genres: Hardcore punk; dark ambient
- Labels: Acroplane; ADVV; Hel Audio; HgM; High North Music; Industrial Coast; Soft Error; TIEP; zoharum; chondritic sound
- Website: https://thetasounds.org/

Θ (theta) is a musician originating from Drama, Greece, living in Tromsø, Northern Norway, since 2007. Θ has music influences stretching from DIY hardcore punk to classic experimental musicians like Xenakis. Θ soundtracks dystopic landscapes with dark ambient and drone sounds using noise sources, probabilistic sequencing and some times melodies. His dark and reflective music draws inspiration from interactions on the threshold between nature and technology. Θ conducts sound experiments using metaphysics, biometrics and various sound sources, such as hardware synthesizers, field recordings, recordings of acoustic elements of daily life, such as construction areas, awkward basements and kitchen ware. The result requires focused attention, in order that the listener experiences how "minimalistic cave sounds" manipulate perception.

Θ is half of the duo metatag and has been collaborating with Tau Cross, WAR//PLAGUE, Mitsumidai and others. Θ is signed with High North Music.

== Discography ==
Solo work:

- 2020 Θ cover in IC X Eyehategod (Industrial coast)
- 2020 Θ - angst (Industrial Coast)
- 2020 Θ cover in Industrial Conflict (Industrial coast)
- 2020 Θ cover in Coastal Clash Soundsystem (Industrial coast)
- 2020 Θ track in Heal The People, Heal The Land (A Beautiful Idea)
- 2020 Θ vs. agent of doom Virus Battle 3: Hendra Vs Black Death (HgM)
- 2020 Θ - isolation frequency (Soft Error)
- 2019 Θ (theta) - distract (dead media recordings)
- 2019 Θ (theta) - requiem (TIEP)
- 2019 Θ (theta) - 1÷1 (self-released)
- 2019 Θ (theta) - matter (ADVV)
- 2018 Θ (theta) - Hello X (Ice-9: project, podcasts)
- 2018 Θ (theta) - orogen (ADVV)
- 2016 Θ (theta) - last (Hel Audio)
- 2013 Θ (theta) - æ ω (Hel Audio)

Collaborative work and contributions:

- 2020 metatag - four (MarsMelons)
- 2020 ISØLATIØN - Pandemic (Deathbed tapes)
- 2019 Θ (theta) - Reclaimed structures (Acroplane recordings)
- 2019 Dreadcore - Schematics (Acroplane recordings)
- 2018 WAR//PLAGUE - Into The Depths (Organize and arise/phobia)
- 2017 Tau Cross - Pillar of Fire (Relapse)
- 2017 metatag - no backup (Game of life)
- 2017 Θ (theta) & Mitsumidai - The Hand OST
- 2016 Θ (theta) & Mitsumidai - Uptake Fear OST (Hel Audio)
- 2015 metatag - surrender (Hel Audio)
- 2014 Θ with EOAS - cloud of drones
- 2014 metatag - transmission (Hel Audio)
- 2013 Θ with EOAS - true night sky
