= Amebix =

British crust punk band

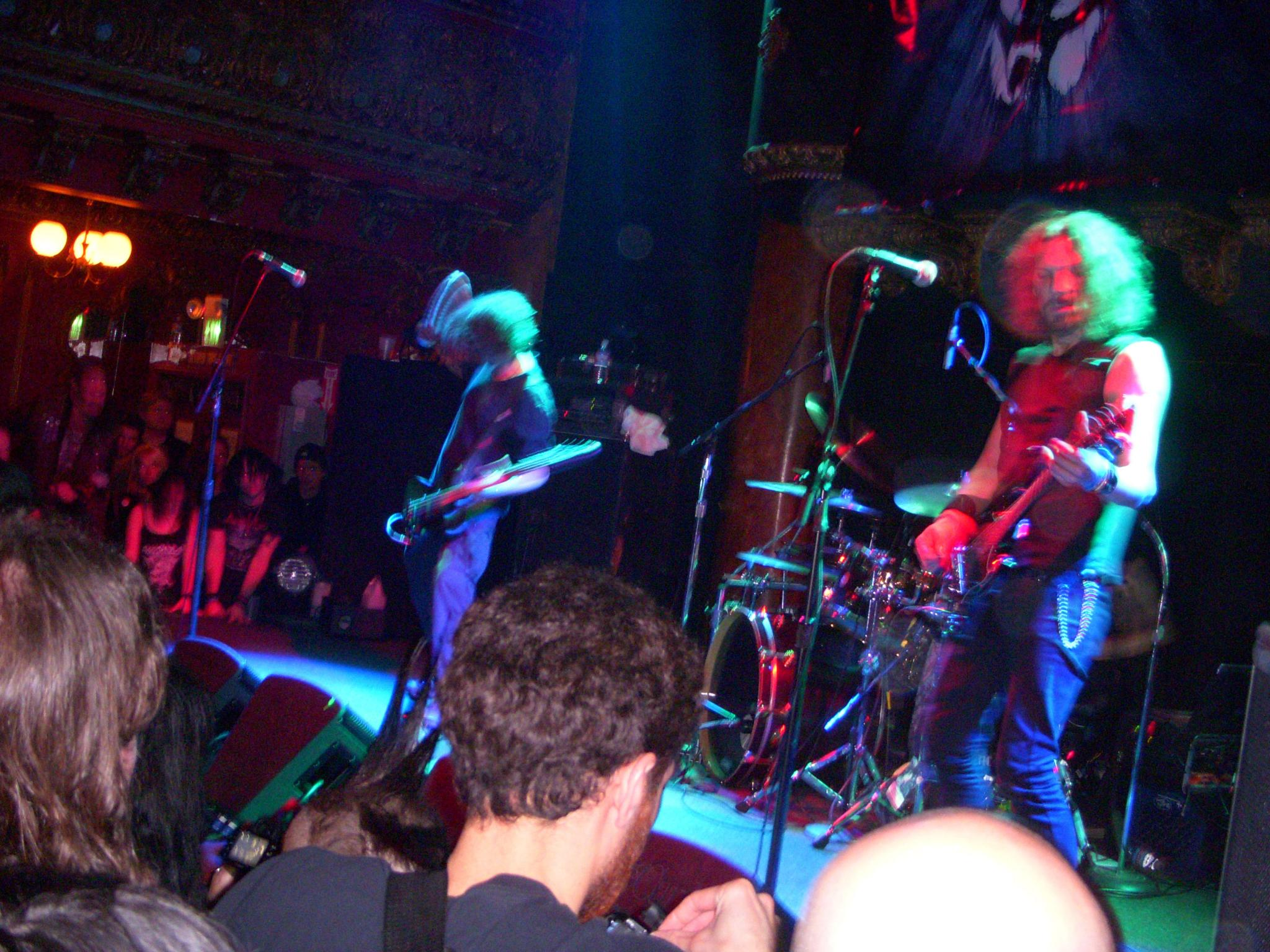
- Amebix performing live in 2009

Background information
- Also known as: The Band with No Name (1978–1979)
- Origin: Tavistock, Devon, UK
- Genres: Crust punk; post-punk
- Years active: 1978–1987, 2008–2012
- Labels: Spiderleg, Heavy Metal, Alternative Tentacles, Moshpit Tragedy
- Spinoffs: Zygote, Tau Cross, False Fed
- Past members: Rob "the Baron" Miller; Chris "Stig" Miller; Andy Billy Jug; Martin Baker; Virus; Ric Gadsby; Norman Butler; Clive; George; Jenghiz; A. Droid; Robert "Spider" Richards; Roy Mayorga

Amebix were an English crust punk band from Tavistock, Devon. A pioneer of the crust punk genre, Amebix's merger of anarcho-punk and post-punk with elements of heavy metal, particularly early extreme metal, inspired musicians who would go on to define the genres of grindcore, black metal, death-doom and metalcore.

Formed in 1978 as the Band with No Name, the band's two consistent members were brothers Rob "the Baron" Miller (vocals, bass) and Chris "Stig" Miller (guitar). The band's earliest releases were post-punk, before beginning to adopt elements of heavy metal music on their debut album No Sanctuary (1983). This album was one of the earliest examples of the crust punk genre, a style which the band would codify with its follow up Arise! (1985). Shortly after the release of their third album Monolith (1987), the group disbanded. The band reunited in 2008, along with drummer Roy Mayorga, a lineup which released their fourth album Sonic Mass (2011), before disbanding again in 2012.

== History ==
=== 1978–1980: Formation ===
In 1978 Rob Miller was involuntarily discharged from his role as an Air Training Corps sergeant in 1978, due to being intoxicated while on duty when stationed in the Netherlands. The same year, his older brother, Chris "Stig" Miller returned to Devon from Jersey. This led the pair to plan forming a band together. They initially came together under the name the Band with No Name, in reference to Clint Eastwood's character the Man with No Name. This founding lineup included Rob Miller on vocals, Chris Miller on guitar, Clive Barnes on bass and Andy Hoare on drums.

In 1979 the band changed its name to Amebix. The name was created from parts of words and sounds to create a word with its own meaning, and Stig Miller has said is "something that has no real meaning outside of itself". The idea of creating such a name was inspired by a mantra given to Stig Miller by a local "guru" when he was thirteen years old, to help him improve his behaviour in school. The band recorded a self-titled six-track demo. Miller was working as a journalist and was sent by his publisher to review a live performance of anarcho-punk band Crass at Abbey Hall in Plymouth. He presented the demo to the band, who included the track University Challenged on their Bullshit Detector compilation.

=== 1981–1984: Who's the Enemy and No Sanctuary ===
In 1981 Miller and Amebix relocated to Peter Tavy and began living with new drummer Martin Baker in Glebe House, the former site of a Saxon burial ground. However, soon after Baker's parents forced him to depart from the band, relocated to London where he was diagnosed with paranoid schizophrenia. The song "Largactyl" was written about his experience. After Baker's departure from the band, the band moved to Gunnislake in Cornwall to live with newly recruited keyboard player Norman Butler. They then relocated to Bristol, where they began squatting with local punk bands like Disorder and Chaos UK. They released their debut EP Who's the Enemy on 28 August 1982 through Spiderleg Records, whom they had been turned onto in the brief period they were living with Crass. The EP peaked at number 33 on the UK Independent Singles and Albums Charts. In early 1983 they released single "Winter", which reached number 18 on the UK Indie Chart, staying on the chart for 7 weeks.

In November 1983 they released their first album No Sanctuary, which reached the top 10 of the U.K. Independent Music Albums Chart. It gained them the attention of Dead Kennedys vocalist Jello Biafra, who signed them to his record label Alternative Tentacles. This led to their subsequent European headline tour. While in Bologna, Italy, Miller and the other members of Amebix were arrested for vandalism of a squat.

=== 1985–1987: Arise!, Monolith and first disbandment ===
Hiring drummer Robert "Spider" Richards in 1985, the band's second album Arise! was released on 14 September 1985 through Alternative Tentacles. It peaked at number 3 on the U.K. Independent Music Chart.

They soon after relocated to Bath, Somerset and halted their squatting. In 1987 they released their third album Monolith through Heavy Metal Records. However Amebix soon began facing major writer's block, which led them to disband in 1987. Following the disbandment, Spider, George, and Stig went on to perform in Zygote.

=== 2008–2012: Sonic Mass and second disbandment ===
In 2008 the Miller brothers reformed Amebix, accompanied by drummer Roy Mayorga. On 25 July 2010 they released the EP Redux through Profane Existence. On 22 July 2011, they released the 12" single "Knights of the Black Sun". On 23 September 2011 they released their fourth studio album Sonic Mass. In November 2012, the band parted ways once again.

In 2014 Rob "The Baron" Miller joined forces with Jon Misery (Misery), Andy Lefton (War//Plague) and Michel "Away" Langevin of Voivod to form Tau Cross.

In 2019 Stig Miller and Mayorga briefly formed a band with Casey Chaos, recording eighteen songs but never releasing any or deciding on a name. In 2023, Stig Miller and Mayorga formed False Fed with Jeff Janiak of Discharge on vocals and JP Parsons on bass.

== Musical style ==
Amebix began their career playing music heavily indebted to Killing Joke. They first embraced metal influences on their 1983 album No Sanctuary, which was one of the earliest releases in the crust punk genre. However, the album retained much of the band's early post-punk sound, to the extent that Altaride Chronicles magazine called the album "post-punk crust". The crust punk sound was codified on their subsequent album Arise (1985). The group however continued to differentiate themselves from the other groups in the genre, by continuing to use elements of post-punk, with Maximum Rocknroll writer Joao Seixas describing them as "expanding on what Killing Joke began with, a Motörhead-inspired sense of rock'n'roll songwriting, and adding a taste of what can be described as deathrock-oriented post-punk guitar atmosphere."

Amebix have cited influences including Bauhaus, Killing Joke, Joy Division, Black Sabbath, Motörhead, Crass, Brian Eno, the Stranglers, Devo, Pink Floyd, Accept, Mercyful Fate, Siouxsie and the Banshees, Magazine, Bruce Springsteen, Neil Young, T. Rex, Iggy Pop, Lou Reed, Sex Pistols, Hawkwind, Stiff Little Fingers, Cockney Rejects, Procol Harum, David Bowie and Bad Brains. Furthermore, the members of Amebix and first-wave black metal band Celtic Frost tape traded with one another, leading to some shared musical characteristics.

=== Legacy ===
By being one of the first bands to blend anarcho-punk and heavy metal music, Amebix are often cited as one of the key bands that helped to create the crust punk genre, and as being influential to many extreme metal bands, especially black metal bands.

They have been cited as an influence by musicians including Sven Erik Kristiansen of Mayhem, Napalm Death, Doom, From Ashes Rise, Gallhammer, Rudimentary Peni, Integrity, Nausea, Disclose, Bolt Thrower, Septic Tank, Starkweather, Mortiis, Heresy, Born Dead Icons, Hellbastard, Deathspell Omega, SECT, Winter, Sepultura and Deviated Instinct. In an interview with The Guardian in 2016, the band was cited along with a number of other British anarcho-punk bands of the early 1980s as being an influence to the American post-metal group Neurosis.

== Members ==
=== Final line-up ===
- Rob "the Baron" Miller – vocals (1978–1987; 2008–2012), bass (1979–1987; 2008–2012)
- Chris "Stig" Miller – guitar, backing vocals (1978–1987; 2008–2012), keyboards (1978–1979)
- Roy Mayorga – drums, percussion, keyboards (2008–2012)

=== Past members ===
- Clive Barnes – bass (1978–1979)
- Andy "Billy Jug" Hoare – drums (1978–1981)
- Ric Gadsby – bass (1979)
- Martin Baker – drums (1981)
- Norman Butler – keyboards (1981–1984)
- Virus – drums (1981–1985; died 2015)
- Jenghiz – keyboards (1984)
- George Fletcher – keyboards (1984–1986)
- Robert "Spider" Richards – drums (1985–1987)
- Andy Wiggins – keyboards (1986–1987)

== Discography ==
=== Studio albums ===
- No Sanctuary (1983, 12", Spiderleg Records)
- Arise! (1985, LP/CD, Alternative Tentacles)
- Monolith (1987, LP/CD, Heavy Metal Records)
- Sonic Mass (2011, LP/CD, Easy Action & Amebix Records)

=== EPs ===
- Who's the Enemy (1982, 7", Spiderleg Records)
- Redux (2010, 12", CD, DD, Profane Existence)

=== Live albums ===
- V živo (1986)

=== Compilation albums ===
- The Power Remains (1993, LP, Skuld Releases)
- No Sanctuary: The Spiderleg Recordings (2008, LP+7"/CD, Alternative Tentacles)
- Bullshit Detector Vol 1: University Challenged (1980, LP, Crass Records, Bullshit Detector)

=== Singles ===
- "Winter" (1983, 7", Spiderleg Records)
- "Knights of the Black Sun" (2011)

=== Demos ===
- Amebix (1979, self-released)
- Right to Ride (1987, self-released)
