= From the Cradle to the Grave (album) =

Studio album by Subhumans
- Released: 1984
- Recorded: 10–14 October 1983
- Genre: Punk rock, anarcho-punk
- Length: 41:28
- Label: Bluurg
- Producer: Subhumans

Subhumans chronology
Time Flies... But Aeroplanes Crash (1983)	From the Cradle to the Grave (1984)	Rats (1984)

Professional ratings
Review scores
Source	Rating
Allmusic	2/5 stars

From the Cradle to the Grave, released in 1984, is the second album by the anarcho-punk band "Subhumans".

== Track listing ==
1. "[Untitled Track]" – 0:44 (The original title on the cover and label is a pair of musical notes, apparently intended to indicate that the track is an instrumental.)
2. "Forget" – 1:20
3. "Waste of Breath" – 1:58
4. "Where’s the Freedom?" – 3:25
5. "Reality Is Waiting for a Bus" – 2:14
6. "Us Fish Must Swim Together" – 3:29 (The original title on the cover and label is a simple abstract drawing of a fish, similar to an ichthys.)
7. "Wake Up Screaming" – 5:22
8. "Adversity" – 2:41
9. "Rain" – 3:13
10. "From the Cradle to the Grave" - 16:53

== Personnel ==
- Dick Lucas – vocals
- Bruce – guitar/vocals, bass on track 10
- Trotsky – drums
- Phil – bass
