= Not So Brave =

Compilation album by Flux of Pink Indians
- Released: 1997
- Recorded: 1980–1982
- Genre: Anarcho-punk; Hardcore punk
- Label: Overground Records

Flux of Pink Indians chronology
Uncarved Block (1986)	Not So Brave (1997)

Professional ratings
Review scores
Source	Rating
AllMusic	2.5/5 stars
The Encyclopedia of Popular Music	3/5 stars

Not So Brave is a compilation album of songs by the anarchist punk band Flux Of Pink Indians, released by Overground Records in 1997. Tracks 1–8 are from their demo "Strive," track 9 is an alternative mix, track 10 is an album version for the compilation album Wargasm, tracks 11–16 are their first demo, and tracks 17–25 are live tracks recorded at the Triad in the Bishop's Stortford.

== Track listing ==
1. Progress - 1:39
2. Blinded By Science - 2:46
3. The Fun Is Over - 2:04
4. Some Of Us Scream, Some Of Us Shout - 1:49
5. Tapioca Sunrise - 4:11
6. Is There Anybody There? - 3:04
7. Myxomatosis - 2:48
8. Take Heed - 2:08
9. Background of Malfunction - 2:38
10. Tapioca Sunrise - 4:00
11. Tube Disaster - 2:32
12. Sick Butchers - 2:26
13. Left Me to Die - 2:17
14. Background of Malfunction - 3:00
15. Is There Anybody There? - 4:02
16. Life after Death - 4:17
17. Sick Butchers - 2:14
18. Take Heed - 2:21
19. Progress - 1:37
20. TV Dinners - 4:16
21. Tube Disaster - 2:35
22. Myxomatosis - 2:26
23. They Lie, We Die - 3:02
24. 1970's have been made in Hong Kong - 3:08
25. The Fun Is Over - 2:09

== Personnel ==
- Colin Latter - vocals (all tracks)
- Derek Birkett - bass guitar, backing vocals (all tracks)
- Kev Hunter - guitar, backing vocals (tracks 1–8, 10, 17–25)
- Martin Wilson - drums (tracks 1–8, 17–25)
- Neil Puncher - guitar (Tracks 9, 11–16)
- Andy Smith - guitar (Tracks 9, 11–16)
- Sid Attion - drums (Tracks 9, 11–16)
- Spider (normally drummer for the band The System) - drums (Track 10)
