= Rob Miller (musician) =

- Also known as: The Baron Rockin Von Aphid; the Baron; Aphid
- Origin: Tavistock, Devon, England
- Genres: Crust punk
- Occupations: Musician, swordsmith
- Instruments: Vocals, bass
- Years active: 1978–present
- Labels: Spiderleg, Alternative Tentacles, Moshpit Tragedy, Heavy Metal, Relapse
- Website: www.castlekeep.co.uk

Rob Miller, also known by the stage name the Baron Rockin Von Aphid or simply the Baron or Aphid, is an English musician and swordsmith. Beginning his musical career in 1978, he is primarily known as the lead vocalist and bass player of pioneering crust punk band Amebix. He also plays in the international supergroup Tau Cross.

== Early life ==
Miller grew up near Tavistock in Devon with his older brother Chris. His father was a gunsmith, descended from Scottish mercenaries who fought for royals in Sweden and Norway. He spent his childhood playing with submachine guns and flintlocks.

== Career ==
=== Amebix: 1978–1987 ===
When Miller was involuntarily discharged from his role as an Air Training Corps sergeant in 1978, due to being intoxicated while on duty when stationed in the Netherlands. The same year, Chris Miller returned to Devon from Jersey, wanting to form a band. This led to the formation of the Band with No Name, with Rob Miller on vocals, Chris Miller on guitar, Clive Barnes on bass and Andy Hoare on drums. In 1979, the band changed its name to Amebix, and recorded a self-titled six-track demo. Soon after, when Miller was sent, by the publication he was a journalist for, to review a live performance of anarcho-punk band Crass at Abbey Hall in Plymouth, he presented the demo to the band, who included the track University Challenged on their Bullshit Detector compilation. In 1981, Miller and Amebix relocated to Peter Tavy and began living with new drummer Martin Baker in Glebe House, the former site of a Saxon burial ground. After Baker's departure from the band, the band moved to Gunnislake in Cornwall to live with newly recruited keyboard player Norman Butler. They then relocated to Bristol, where they began squatting with local punk bands like Disorder and Chaos UK. They released their debut EP Who's the Enemy on 28 August 1982 through Spiderleg Records, whom they had been turned onto in the brief period they were living with Crass. The EP peaked at number 33 on the UK Independent Singles and Albums Charts. In November 1983 they released their first album No Sanctuary, which reached the top 10 of the U.K. Independent Music Chart, and gained them the attention of Dead Kennedys vocalist Jello Biafra, who signed them to his record label Alternative Tentacles. This led to their subsequent European headline tour. While in Bologna, Italy, Miller and the other members of Amebix were arrested for vandalism of a squat. Alternative Tentacles released the band's second album Arise! on 14 September 1985, which peaked at number 3 on the U.K. Independent Music Chart. They soon after relocated to Bath, Somerset and halted their squatting. In 1987 they released their third album Monolith through Heavy Metal Records. However Amebix soon began facing major writer's block, which led them to break up in 1987.

=== Beginning swordsmithing: 1988–2007 ===
After Amebix's dissolution, Miller and his girlfriend Jen separated, which left him homeless and with no contact to his children. Soon after, he was involved in a motorcycle accident which broke his arm and destroyed the only clothes he owned. While working in a hotel, Miller met a man whom he described as having "very abstract ideas about mythology", which led to him wanting to a pursue a career as a swordsmith. In 1991, he moved to the Isle of Skye, where he designed his first sword for a local.

=== Sonic Mass: 2008–2012 ===
In 2008, Miller reformed Amebix with his brother and Roy Mayorga. On 23 September 2011 they released their fourth studio album Sonic Mass. In November 2012, the band parted ways once again.

=== Tau Cross: 2013–present ===
In 2013, Miller formed Tau Cross. On 19 May 2015, they released their self-titled debut album through Relapse Records. On 21 July 2017, they released their second album Pillar of Fire. In July 2019, Tau Cross were suddenly removed from their contract with Relapse Records, after it was discovered that Miller had thanked a prominent Holocaust denier, Gerard Menuhin, in the liner notes for their up-and-coming third album Messengers of Deception. The rest of the band soon distanced themselves from his views on the topic, which led to him continuing the band without any of the then-members.

== Personal life ==
Miller identifies as gnostic and believes that the universe is an illusion created by a powerful force, that "is not conscious of the fact that it's not God itself".

Politically, he is an anarchist, however does not believe that any one person has the right to impose their politics onto another.

He has a son named Richard, to a woman he had a relationship with in the '80s.

== Discography ==
With Amebix

- No Sanctuary (1983)
- Arise! (1985)
- Monolith (1987)
- Sonic Mass (2011)

With Tau Cross

- Tau Cross (2015)
- Pillar of Fire (2017)
- Messengers of Deception (2020)
