= Uncarved Block (album) =

Studio album by Flux of Pink Indians
- Released: 1986
- Genre: Post-Punk, Tribal
- Length: 35:46
- Label: One Little Indian
- Producer: Adrian Sherwood

Flux of Pink Indians chronology
The Fucking Cunts Treat Us Like Pricks (1984)	Uncarved Block (1986)	Not So Brave (1997)

Professional ratings
Review scores
Source	Rating
The Encyclopedia of Popular Music	3/5 stars

Uncarved Block is the third and final studio album by Flux of Pink Indians who, by then, were known simply as Flux. It was released in 1986. The album was produced by Adrian Sherwood.

The bassist of Flux of Pink Indians, Derek Birkett, started the One Little Indian record label. Uncarved Block was the label's first album release.

The album's title was inspired by Benjamin Hoff's book The Tao of Pooh.

The musicians credited on the sleevenotes are Adrian Sherwood, Bob, Bonjo I (African Head Charge), Brian Pugsley, Coal (Colin Latter), Smuff, Kenny, Wellington, Lu, Martin, Paul White, Ray Shulman, Shal, Style Scott (Dub Syndicate), Sue Churchill, Tan and Tim.

The album artwork was by Paul White.

According to Sean Forbes, one promotional device for the album was the issuing of 25 numbered wooden blocks.

== Reception ==
A critical review for the New Musical Express stated "...Flux are merely caught up in the intracies [sic] of sixth-form wordplay and alienated white-boy funk which is marked most by that post-industrial, pre-Chernobyl shakedown stamp."

The 1992 book The Guinness Who's Who of Indie and New Wave Music called Uncarved Block "the most unexpected of the band's three studio albums, delivering more polemic allied to dance and funk rhythms which left their previous audience totally non-plussed. It was a brave effort, and one which, alongside their debut, stands up to repeated listening."

In his 2013 book Taoism for Dummies, Jonathan Herman noted that:

"More than half the album’s song titles echo Taoist language, and surprisingly, some of it is Taoist language from sources other than the classical texts: 'Nothing is Not Done,' 'Value of Nothing,' 'Backward,' 'Just ls,' and 'Youthful Immortal.' If you're used to the Tao Te Ching presented with sublime calligraphy, pastoral landscapes, and earthy musical tableaux, the Flux’s discordant synthesizers and bizarre sound effects are sure to jolt your picture of Taoism."

In 2016 Adrian Sherwood included the track "The Value of Nothing" on his Sherwood At The Controls vol. 2 1985-1990 retrospective compilation album and singer Josh Haden rated Uncarved Block as one of this top ten albums of all time.

In 2021, Luke Younger (aka sound artist Helm) selected Uncarved Block as one of his favourite albums in a feature for The Quietus, explaining: "This was one of those records I put on with no expectations and then as soon as it was on I was like 'wow, this is fucking amazing'. It sounded nothing like I expected it to... It takes that whole collage thing... and creates this really interesting intersection between punk, dub and industrial."

== Track listing ==
=== Side one ===
1. "Value of Nothing" - 2:47
2. "Youthful Immortal" - 5:33
3. "Just Is" - 1:06
4. "Children Who Know" - 7:49

=== Side two ===
1. "Backward" - 2:40
2. "Footprints in the Snow" - 6:16
3. "Nothing Is Not Done" - 4:32
4. "Stonecutter" - 5:04
