= Redus =

Redus is a surname. Notable people with the surname include:

- Gary Redus (born 1956), American baseball player
- Frog Redus (born Wilson Robert Redus, 1905–1979), American baseball player

== See also ==
- Redux (disambiguation)
- Reedus
