= Kronstadt Uprising (band) =

English anarcho-punk band

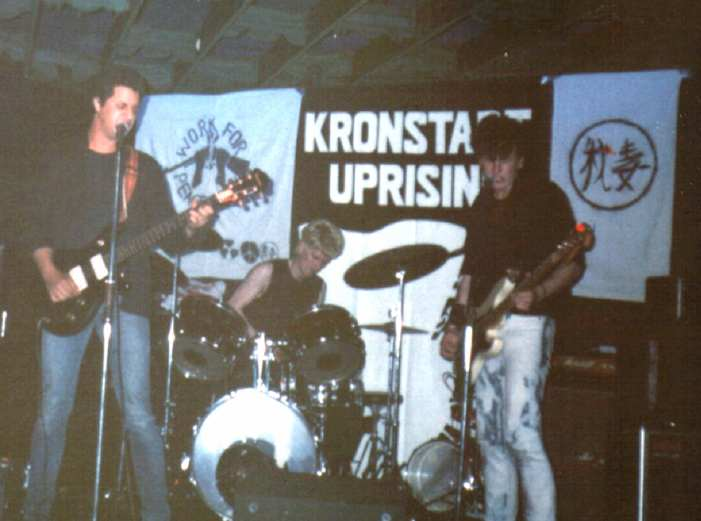
Kronstadt Uprising, pictured performing at 'Sids' nightclub, Southend-on-Sea, 1983

Kronstadt Uprising were an anarcho-punk band from Southend-on-Sea, Essex, England during the 1980s.

== History ==
Named in tribute to the events of the Kronstadt rebellion the band were formed in 1981 by Steve Pegrum joined by Spencer Blake, Paul Lawson and Andy Fisher (although in 1982 the band were to become a three-piece with Paul Lawson taking on both guitar and vocal duties). Nick 'Filf' Robinson of the Sinyx was also briefly in the band, providing additional guitar. They recorded their first demo late in 1981, a track of which was picked up by Crass and brought the band wider attention on volume two of the Bullshit Detector series of compilation albums released by Crass Records. During the mid-1980s the band moved away from their original anarcho-punk roots, and began to incorporate influences from glam rock as well as acts such as Johnny Thunders. After a period of many line-up changes KU finally split up in 1986.

The band released two EPs, "The Unknown Revolution" (Spiderleg Records) and "Part of the Game" (Dogrock Records). A twenty three track retrospective CD, Insurrection, which includes most of the band's recordings including demo tapes, etc., was released in November 2000.

== Discography ==
=== Singles ===
- "The Unknown Revolution EP": "Blind People" / "Dreamers of Peace" / "End of Part One" / "Xenophobia" (Spiderleg Records, SDL 12, 1983)
- "Part of the Game" / "The Hosemen" (Dog Rock Records, SDL 108, 1985)

=== Albums ===
- Insurrection (Overground Records, OVER 85VPCD, 2000)

=== Compilation albums ===
- "Receiver Deceiver" appeared on Bullshit Detector Volume Two (Crass Records, CRASS 221984/2, 1982)
- "Blind People" appeared on Anti-War (Overground Records, OVER 103VPCD, 2005)
- "Xenophobia" appeared on Burning Britain: A Story of Independent UK Punk 1980 – 1983 (Cherry Red Records, CRCDBOX53 CD, 2018)
- "Blind People" appeared on Southend Punk – Volume 1 (Angels in Exile Records, AIECD 004, 2020)

== Sources ==
- Glasper, Ian (2014). "Kronstadt Uprising". The Day the Country Died: A History of Anarcho Punk 1980–1984. PM Press. pp. 96–100. ISBN 978-1-60486-516-5. OCLC 887704000.
