= Monolith (Amebix album) =

Studio album by Amebix
- Released: 1987
- Recorded: SAM Studios, Bristol; May/June 1987
- Genre: Crust punk, thrash metal, post-punk
- Length: 44:00
- Label: Heavy Metal (original release); Moshpit Tragedy (2008 re-release); Easy Action (2016 remaster)
- Producer: Amebix

Amebix chronology
Arise! (1986)	Monolith (1987)	Redux (EP) (2011)

Monolith is the third studio album by the British crust punk band Amebix, released in 1987 by Heavy Metal Records. Shortly after its release, Amebix disbanded, and Monolith would be their final studio album until they reunited in 2008 and released Sonic Mass in 2011.

The album was re-released in 2008 as a sliding-scale download by Moshpit Tragedy Records. The album was remastered and re-released again in 2016 on Easy Action Records.

== Track listing ==
No.	Title	Length
1.	"Monolith" (instrumental)	3:10
2.	"Nobody's Driving"	5:23
3.	"The Power Remains"	4:33
4.	"Time Bomb"	4:27
5.	"Last Will and Testament"	5:00
6.	"I.C.B.M."	6:05
7.	"Chain Reaction"	5:27
8.	"Fallen from Grace"	4:14
9.	"Coming Home"	5:44

== Critical reception ==
Professional ratings
Review scores
Source	Rating
Punknews	3/5 stars

While significantly less positive than its predecessor Arise!, Monolith was generally appreciated by Punknews. It was mainly metal-oriented, with aspects of anarcho-punk. The review stated that no particular song was worthy of note, but that the album was generally worthwhile.

== Personnel ==
Amebix

- The Baron Rockin von Aphid (Rob Miller) — bass, vocals
- Stig da Pig (Chris Miller) — guitar, backing vocals
- Spider (Robert Richards) — drums
- A. Droid (Andy Wiggins) — keyboards

Additional personnel

- Cath — flute on "Monolith"
- ARj — backing vocals on "Coming Home"
