= The Fucking Cunts Treat Us Like Pricks =

Studio album by Flux of Pink Indians
- Released: 31 March 1984
- Genres: Anarcho-punk; noise rock; experimental rock
- Label: Spiderleg

Flux of Pink Indians chronology
Strive to Survive Causing Least Suffering Possible (1983)	The Fucking Cunts Treat Us Like Pricks (1984)	Uncarved Block (1986)

Professional ratings
Review scores
Source	Rating
The Encyclopedia of Popular Music	2/5 stars

The Fucking Cunts Treat Us Like Pricks is the second studio album by the English anarcho-punk band Flux of Pink Indians. It was released as a double album on the band's own Spiderleg Records in 1984.

The album's lyrical content concerned violence between men and women, based on the experiences of a band member who had been sexually assaulted. The title was a Dada-style ploy to get attention for this social message.

The album featured artwork by Crass guitarist Andy Palmer.

A 2016 primer on Anarcho Punk in The Wire magazine noted the influence of Art Ensemble of Chicago and Whitehouse and described the album as:

"Rudimentary punk blasts are hard panned, drenched in distortion, subjected to scything tape edits and littered with sampled footage of pornography, or snatches of the BBC Radio One Steve Wright In The Afternoon show. Segments about domestic violence flow into dispassionate recitations of injuries sustained by Falklands soldiers."

The Fucking Cunts Treat Us Like Pricks reached number two on the UK Indie Chart, spending fifteen weeks on the chart in total. Music Week listed the album in its Indie Album Chart as "The F.......................................".

== Obscenity controversy ==
When reissued in 1986 on band member Derek Birkett's own One Little Indian label, the album was banned by several major retailers including HMV and Our Price due to its sexually explicit title and cover art.

In September 1987, Greater Manchester Police raided independent record shop Eastern Bloc following an alleged complaint by a member of the public. Copies of the album were seized and one of the owners, Martin Price, was warned that he could face prosecution under the Obscene Publications Act for "indecent display" as the album had been promoted in the shop's window. The Director of Public Prosecutions determined that prosecution was not viable. Under the direction of Chief Constable James Anderton the shop was charged with displaying "Obscene Articles For Publication For Gain". Martin Price represented the shop in court The case was eventually dropped by the police after several adjournments, due to costs. Price (who would later be a member of techno group 808 State) felt that this meant that morality could be bought, as he had been prepared to go to court to defend his, but the police had put a price on theirs.

The band, its two record labels, and its publishing company, Second Wind, were also charged under the Obscene Publications Act. Charges against One Little Indian were dropped in March 1988.

== Critical reception ==
Shortly after the album was released, the band stated in a fanzine interview:

"...the reaction to The Fucking Cunts Treat Us Like Pricks has actually distanced us from punk rock, because most punks, in Britain at least, haven't liked it. But judging from letters and people we've come into contact with, people who aren't into punk have really liked it. We'd never put out anything that we didn't feel was up to scratch, musically or lyrically. I think that record is amazing. There's a lot of people who don't like that record because it's not based in rock and roll."

Singer Colin Latter would subsequently describe the album as "...rubbish. A total waste of time."

A review in Maximum Rocknroll stated:

"On this bizarre and surprising double album, FLUX alternates between strangely mixed, highly inflammatory hardcore attacks and bursts of industrial noise. Most of the material here is rather unpleasant listening, though the vitriolic lyrics and some of the studio effects are remarkably compelling. I’m not sure whether I like it or not, but it’s certainly challenging."

The New Musical Express review of the album included: "This heroically ugly double LP has very little to do with 'punk'. It's a vast dog-eared canvas of sounds and visions in revolt, Thatcher's Britain force fed into a swollen stomach and the resultant vomit recorded on vinyl."

The 1992 book The Guinness Who's Who of Indie and New Wave Music described the album as "little short of a directionless cacophony".

In 2013, Uncut magazine suggested that the album was "seemingly rejecting music as a bourgeois conceit".

The 2016 The Wire magazine primer stated that:

"At any given moment you could persuade yourself it was a visionary masterpiece, or a directionless disaster, and then persuade yourself of the opposite within two minutes... [the album] felt if not quite like self-sabotage, at least an attempt to shake off the misery of the present by creating something unrepeatable, impossible to assimilate."

Also in 2016, writer and academic Nigel Ball reflected on how the release had influenced him as a teenager:

"...why have I picked this record out as changing my perspective of just what music can be? Firstly because it taught me the value of not rejecting something on first listen — I learned to love this record. Secondly because it was deliberately challenging and it shocked me out of my then musical complacencies. Thirdly because I got into its experimental nature. This, I thought, is what punk should be all about. Not because it is aggressive, but because it is attempting to explore new ground beyond the conventional, and anarcho-punk, like punk rock before it, had become conventional with their rockisms and formulas. Fucking Pricks… is punk, sure, but it is also noise, industrial, jazz, and Dada. It is also extremely and unapologetically political."

== Legacy ==
"In the end, the album title chosen by the Sex Pistols was cleared of obscenity charges, and indeed was soon looking relatively quaint, in the light of subsequent LPs such as that perennial family singalong favourite, Flux of Pink Indians' The Fucking Cunts Treat Us Like Pricks (1984, also prosecuted for obscenity, also acquitted)."

— Max Décharné, Vulgar tongues: an alternative history of English slang (2016)

The title of the album appears as a piece of graffiti in David Peace's 2002 novel Nineteen Eighty Three: Book Four of the Red Riding Quartet. It is also used in dialogue in Julian Gough's 2011 novel Jude In London.

English post-punk band Bilge Pump released a 10" EP titled The Fucking Cunts Still Treat Us Like Pricks on Gringo Records in 2010.

In 2019, comedian Stewart Lee ironically claimed that "80s anarcho-punks Flux of Pink Indians were privately dismayed by the Countryside Alliance's misappropriation of their album The Fucking Cunts Treat Us Like Pricks to soundtrack its campaign against rural post-office closures." at the conclusion of an extended routine about right wing individuals adopting left-wing songs.

== Track listing ==
=== Side one ===
1. "Punk"
2. "Mind Fuckers Fucking Minds"
3. "Hard Sell"
4. "Love Song"
5. "Mickey on Tuneoil"

=== Side two ===
1. "Desire"
2. "Blood Lust Rite"
3. "The Falklands War"

=== Side three ===
1. "Punk"
2. "Life We Make"
3. "Trouble at the Heart"
4. "The Sun (The Paper That Supports Our Boys and Rapes Our Girls)"
5. "Shadow of Abuse"
6. "Very Funny"

=== Side four ===
1. "Cure for the Coprolite"
