= Who's the Enemy =

EP by Amebix
- Released: 28 August 1982
- Genre: Post-punk
- Length: 14:22
- Label: Spiderleg Records

Amebix chronology
Who's the Enemy (1982)	No Sanctuary (1983)

Who's the Enemy is an extended play and the first studio release overall by the British crust punk band Amebix. It was released on Spiderleg Records on 28 August 1982.

The EP was re-released as part of the compilation No Sanctuary: The Spiderleg Recordings in 2008 on Alternative Tentacles.

== Track listing ==
No.	Title	Length
1.	"Carnage"	5:04
2.	"Curfew"	2:40
3.	"Belief"	2:51
4.	"No Gods, No Masters"	3:47

== Personnel ==
Amebix

- The Baron Rockin von Aphid (Rob Miller) — vocals, bass
- Stig Da Pig (Chris Miller) — guitar
- Virus (Neil Worthington) — drums
- Norman — keyboards
