= Theta, Gauteng =

- Location within Gauteng Location within South Africa
- Coordinates: 26.232°S 28.004°E
- Country: South Africa
- Province: Gauteng
- Municipality: City of Johannesburg
- Main Place: Johannesburg

Area
  - Total: 0.58 km^{2} (0.22 sq mi)

Population (2011)
  - Total: 0
  - Density: 0.0/km^{2} (0.0/sq mi)
- Time zone: UTC+2 (SAST)

Theta is a suburb of Johannesburg, South Africa. It lies south-west of the Johannesburg CBD and is adjacent to Booysens Reserve. The suburb was originally developed for science, industrial and research businesses. It is located in Region F of the City of Johannesburg Metropolitan Municipality.

== History ==
Prior to the discovery of gold on the Witwatersrand in 1886, the suburb lies on land on two of the original farms called Mooifontein and Vierfontein. The suburb's name originates from the Greek letter Theta.
