= Arise! (Amebix album) =

Studio album by Amebix
- Released: 14 September 1985
- Genres: Crust punk, heavy metal
- Length: 38:20
- Label: Alternative Tentacles
- Producer: Jason Rosenberg

Amebix chronology
No Sanctuary (1983)	Arise! (1985)	Monolith (1986)

Arise! is the second studio album by the British crust punk band Amebix, released on 14 September 1985 through Alternative Tentacles. It was reissued on CD and vinyl in 2000 with two bonus tracks recorded in 1987. The album was remastered a second time in 2014.

== Background ==
"The Moor" is based upon "Requiem" by György Ligeti, famously used in the Lunar monolith sequence in 2001: A Space Odyssey.

"Largactyl" is a misspelled version of the proprietary name the antipsychotic medication chlorpromazine. It was written in response to (and somewhat in honour of) previous drummer Martin Baker being diagnosed with paranoid schizophrenia and being involuntarily institutionalised by his parents.

Lyrics from "The Darkest Hour" are taken from And When I Die by Laura Nyro.

== Track listing ==
No.	Title	Length
1.	"The Moor" (instrumental)	3:05
2.	"Axeman"	3:30
3.	"Fear of God"	3:08
4.	"Largactyl"	3:45
5.	"Drink and Be Merry"	6:03
6.	"Spoils of Victory"	4:14
7.	"Arise!"	5:18
8.	"Slave"	3:50
9.	"The Darkest Hour"	4:50

2000 re-issue bonus tracks
No.	Title	Length
10.	"Right to Ride"	6:06
11.	"Beyond the Sun"	6:09

== Critical reception ==
Professional ratings
Review scores
Source	Rating
AllMusic	4/5 stars
Punknews	5/5 stars

Reviews of the album, and its re-masterings, were positive across reviews.

AllMusic praised its successful merging of genres, combined with "tribal rhythms and apocalyptic aesthetic" with bleak yet hopeful lyrics. They also noted its major role in inspiring later metal bands such as Sepultura and Neurosis.

Punknews was extremely positive, describing the original as a major advancement on both the band's prior efforts but also that of other similar bands. Again the ability to blend genres with both power and darkness remarked on, counterbalanced by moments of lyrical hope. The 2014 remastering was also appreciated, with certain intricacies given greater sharpness and notability, further improving the complexity of the album.

The Quietus also felt Arise! trod new ground, with yet more mention of its metal/punk genre combo, and added Gallhammer to the bands inspired by it.

== Personnel ==
Amebix

- The Baron Rockin von Aphid (Rob Miller) – bass, vocals
- Stig da Pig (Chris Miller) – guitar, backing vocals
- George Fletcher – keyboard
- Spider (Robert Richards) – drums

Guest musicians

- Gabba Cox, Mark Byrne – backing vocals

Additional personnel

- Jason Rosenberg – production, design, concept
- George Horn – remastering (2000 re-release)
