= Tau Cross (band) =

Heavy metal band

- Genres: Crust punk; heavy metal; punk rock
- Years active: 2013–present
- Label: Relapse
- Members: Rob Miller
- Past members: Andy Lefton; Jon Misery; Tom Radio; James Adams; Michel Langevin

Tau Cross is a rock band founded by Rob Miller of England's Amebix.

== Controversy ==
Tau Cross' third album, Messengers of Deception, was originally scheduled for release on 9 August 2019 via Relapse Records. In July 2019, however, Relapse chose to sever its relationship with the band and cancel the album's release due to Miller's inclusion of Gerard Menuhin, a Holocaust denier, in his thanks list, submitted to the label in the late stages of production. Shortly thereafter the other four members of the band issued a joint statement expressing their lack of previous knowledge about, and desire not to be associated with, Menuhin's work and Miller's interest in it. Within a week Miller had "released" guitarist Andy Lefton and drummer Michel Langevin and made an ambivalent public statement about the status of the remaining members, expressing his resolve to continue the band alone if necessary. Miller eventually self-released the album in December 2020, after resurfacing with a new lineup for the band.

== Musical style ==
Tau Cross' musical style is primarily described as crust punk, punk rock and heavy metal, with many critics referring to it as a continuation of the style of Miller's previous band Amebix The band have also been described as alternative rock, gothic rock, traditional doom metal, post-punk, progressive rock and thrash metal and industrial. Citing influences such as Killing Joke, Black Sabbath, Pink Floyd, Joy Division and 16th century English mysticism, their music has also been compared to the work of Motörhead, Prong and New Model Army.

== Members ==
Current

- Rob "The Baron" Miller - bass, vocals
- The Kurgan - guitars
- Talamh - drums

Former

- Andy Lefton - guitar
- Jon Misery - guitar
- Tom Radio - bass
- James Adams - keyboards
- Michel "Away" Langevin - drums

== Discography ==
- Tau Cross (2015)
- Pillar of Fire (2017)
- Messengers of Deception (2020)
