= Flux of Pink Indians =

English punk rock band

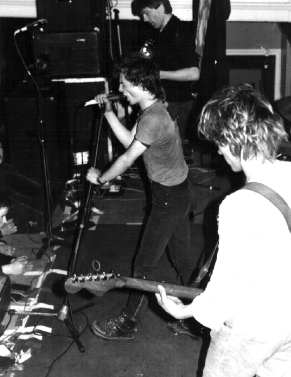
- Flux of Pink Indians performing live at Digbeth Civic Hall, Birmingham, 1981

Background information
- Also known as: Flux
- Origin: Bishop's Stortford, Hertfordshire, England
- Genres: Anarcho-punk; post-punk
- Years active: 1980–1986
- Labels: Crass; Spiderleg; Overground; One Little Indian; Dr. Strange
- Past members: Colsk Latter; Derek Birkett; Andy Smith; Neil Puncher; Sid; Dave "Bambi" Ellesmere; Simon Middlehurst; Kev Hunter; Martin Wilson; Louise Bell

Flux of Pink Indians was an English punk rock band from Bishop's Stortford, Hertfordshire, active between 1980 and 1986.

== Biography ==
The band formed in Hertfordshire, England in 1980 from the remaining members of The Epileptics (who during the first half of 1979 changed their name to Epi-X, owing to letters of complaint from The British Epilepsy Association) by Colsk Latter (vocals) and Derek Birkett (bass guitar) with guitarists Andy Smith and Neil Puncher, and drummer Sid Ation (who was also a member of Rubella Ballet).

The group signed with the Crass Records label in 1981. Their debut EP Neu Smell was released on Crass in 1981; it featured indie hit "Tube Disasters". Flux of Pink Indians released their debut album in 1983, Strive to Survive Causing Least Suffering Possible, through their own label, Spiderleg Records.

They released a second album in 1984, The Fucking Cunts Treat Us Like Pricks. This was banned by many British retailers, and copies were seized by Greater Manchester Police from the Eastern Bloc record shop, which was charged with displaying "Obscene Articles For Publication For Gain".

Ation left the group to work full-time with Rubella Ballet, and was replaced by Bambi, formerly of Discharge, while Smith was replaced by Simon Middlehurst. However, both departed for their original band, The Insane. While auditioning for their replacements, Puncher also left; the line-up was completed by former Darlex and Epileptics guitarist Kev Hunter, and drummer Martin Wilson. An extensive interview with the band appeared in No Class fanzine.

By 1986, the band had shortened their name to Flux and released their third album, Uncarved Block, which was produced by Adrian Sherwood and featured several members of the On-U Sound Records label.

Flux disbanded in 1987.

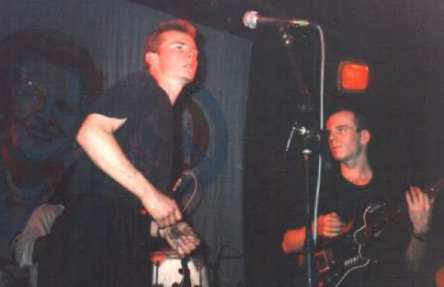
Flux performing material from Uncarved Block, University of London, 1986

Birkett, making use of his experiences with Spiderleg, set up One Little Indian Records. Latter went on to form the dance-influenced Hotalacio, and was joined by drummer Wilson and guitarist Middlehurst.

In 2007, the band re-formed for an intended one-off gig supporting ex-Crass vocalist Steve Ignorant for his "The Feeding of the 5000" gig at London's Shepherd's Bush Empire in November of that year. The Strive To Survive-era line-up (Latter, Hunter and Wilson) was joined by ex-Decadence Within bass player Ian Glasper, replacing Birkett, and as a result of their well-received set the band played another three gigs in 2008, in Bradford, Dijon and London.

== Legacy ==
In 2009, rap artist Professor Green sampled the group's bassline from "Tube Disasters" for his single "Hard Night Out".

The band and their album Uncarved Block were mentioned in the 2013 book Taoism for Dummies, under the sidebar titled "An uncarved Flux of Pink anarchy".

In an interview with The Guardian in 2016, the band was cited along with a number of other British anarcho-punk bands of the early '80s as being an influence to the American avant-garde metal group Neurosis.

In 2019 actor Martin Freeman spoke to The Telegraph about his older brother's influence on him as a child: "...he was a proper squatting, commune-dwelling teenage punk. He listened to heavy anarcho-punk bands like Poison Girls, The Clash, Flux of Pink Indians, and he always seemed to be out doing interesting things like getting arrested."

== Members ==
=== Original lineup ===
- Colin "Colsk" Latter (vocals)
- Derek Birkett (bass guitar)
- Andy Smith (guitar)
- Neil Puncher (guitar)
- Sid Ation (drums)

=== Later members ===
- Dave "Bambi" Ellesmere (drums)
- Simon Middlehurst (guitar)
- Kev Hunter (guitar)
- Martin Wilson (drums)
- Louise Bell (guitar)
- Tim Kelly (guitar)

== Discography ==
Chart placings shown are from the UK Independent Chart unless stated otherwise.

=== Flux of Pink Indians ===
==== LPs ====
- Strive to Survive Causing Least Suffering Possible (1983, Spiderleg Records, LP, SDL8) No. 1 (UK Albums Chart No. 79) (reissued 1987 on One Little Indian)
- The Fucking Cunts Treat Us Like Pricks (1984, Spiderleg Records) No. 2 (reissued 1987 on One Little Indian)
- Uncarved Block (1986, as 'Flux' – One Little Indian) No. 16

==== EPs ====
- Neu Smell (1981, Crass Records, 7", No. 2 – re-released in 2024, One Little Indian, 12")
- Taking a Liberty (7" – Spiderleg Records – 1984)

==== Compilations ====
- Neu Smell / Taking a Liberty EP (12" – One Little Indian – 1987, No. 30)
- Strive to Survive & Neu Smell (CD – One Little Indian – 1989)
- The Fucking Cunts Treat Us Like Pricks / Taking a Liberty (CD – One Little Indian – 1989)
- Not So Brave (LP – Overground Records – 1997)
- Live Statement (LP – Overground Records – 2002)
- Fits and Starts (CD – Dr. Strange Records – 2003)

=== The Licks ===
- 1970's E.P. (1979, Stortbeat Records, 7", BEAT8)

Tracks: "1970s Have Been Made in Hong Kong" / "System Rejects" / "Hitler's Still a Nazi" / "War Crimes"

=== The Epileptics ===
- Last Bus to Debden EP (1981, Spiderleg, 7", SDL2) No. 17
- 1970's E.P. (1982, Spiderleg, 7", SDL1) (re-recording of The Licks EP with Penny Rimbaud of Crass on drums) No. 21
