= Wessex '82 =

EP by The Subhumans, The Pagans, Organized Chaos and The A-Heads
- Released: 1982
- Recorded: 1982
- Genre: Punk rock
- Label: Bluurg Records

The Subhumans, The Pagans, Organized Chaos and The A-Heads chronology
Religious Wars (1982)	Wessex '82 (1982)	The Day the Country Died (1982)

Wessex '82 is a split EP release by UK punk bands The Subhumans, The Pagans, Organised Chaos and The A-Heads. Each band contributed one track to the record. This was also the first vinyl release on the Subhumans' own label, Bluurg Records.

== Track listing ==
1. Subhumans – "No Thanks"
2. The Pagans – "Wave Goodbye to Your Dreams"
3. Organized Chaos – "Victim"
4. A-Heads – "No Rule"

== Personnel ==
- Adrian Pickford – cover artwork
- Steve Collinson – engineering (track 4)
