= Culture Shock (band) =

English ska punk band

- Origin: Warminster, Wiltshire, England
- Genres: Anarcho-punk, ska punk
- Years active: 1986–1989, 2012–present
- Label: Bluurg
- Members: Dick Lucas, Jasper Pattison, Bill, Alex Gordon
- Past members: Nigel Johnston, Paul Taylor
- Website: cultureshockuk.bandcamp.com

Culture Shock are an English ska punk band formed in Warminster, Wiltshire in 1986 by Dick Lucas, previously of the Subhumans.

== Band history ==
Culture Shock have played hundreds of gigs, including frequent appearances at free festivals, and released six studio albums on the Bluurg record label. Lucas' lyrics were mostly concerned with social and political issues, from cruelty to animals, Northern Ireland, war, and social alienation, but were far from angry rants, often finding a positive and empowering perspective.

Culture Shock split at the end of 1989, as Bill and Nige both had young families to support. Dick went on to form Citizen Fish with Jasper, the bassist on Culture Shock's final album, and two other former members of the Subhumans. Nigel died in 1993.

== Reformation ==
Interest in the band was revived by the release of the Everything CD retrospective in 2012; Culture Shock reformed as a gigging band and have been playing since 2013. The line-up remains the same except with Alex (from Citizen Fish) on guitar.

== Members ==
- Dick Lucas – vocals
- Bill – drums
- Jasper Pattison – bass guitar
- Alex Gordon – guitar

=== Former members ===
- Paul Taylor – bass guitar on Go Wild and Onwards & Upwards
- Nigel Johnston – guitar, vocals

== Discography ==
=== Albums ===
- Go Wild (1986), Fish 18
- Onwards & Upwards (1988), Fish 20
- All the Time! (1989), Fish 23
- Attention Span (2016)
- The Humanity Show (2018)
- Mandemic (2021)

=== Compilation albums ===
- Everything (3CD/MP3) (2012), Fish 51

=== Cassette-only releases ===
- "Living History" (demo) (April 1986), Bluurg Tapes 66
- "Live at the Fish", Earth Zone
- "Reality Stop No.44" (demo) (December 1986), Bluurg Tapes 71
- Hot and Sweaty (live compilation), Bluurg Tapes 79

=== Compilation appearances ===
- Crisis Point EP
- Stonehenge EP
- Open Mind Surgery LP
- Travellers Aid Trust (2LP & CD), Flicknife

== See also ==
- Punk ideology
- List of anarcho-punk bands
