= One Little Independent Records =

UK record label

- Parent company: Spiderleg Records
- Founded: 1985
- Founder: Derek Birkett
- Genre: Punk rock
- Country of origin: United Kingdom
- Location: London
- Official website: olirecords.com

One Little Independent Records (formerly One Little Indian Records) is an English independent record label. It was founded in 1985 by former Flux of Pink Indians bassist Derek Birkett, his wife Sue Birkett and former Flux guitarist Tim Kelly.

Its previous name was inspired by the "philosophies of the Indigenous People of the Americas". In the 1990s it set up a number of subsidiary labels.

== History ==
=== 1980s ===
Many of the early releases on the label stemmed from the founders' anarcho-punk connections. These included reissues of two albums by Flux of Pink Indians, and new releases by several acts previously associated with Crass Records: D & V, The Babymen (featuring members of The Cravats), Annie Anxiety Bandez and the Sugarcubes (who included Björk and other former members of anarcho-punk band K.U.K.L.) The first album release on the label was Uncarved Block by Flux.

Other early signings included A.R. Kane., Kitchens of Distinction and The Shamen.

=== 1990s ===
Success continued with Alabama 3, Björk, Chumbawamba, Skunk Anansie, Sneaker Pimps.

Beginning in 1990, the label created several autonomous satellite imprints including Clean-up Records, Partisan Records and Fat Cat Records,. Artists on the labels included Alabama 3 (A3), Sigur Rós, and Sneaker Pimps. Elemental Records was added to the roster in 1995.

The song titles of The Shamen's 1996 album Hempton Manor form an acrostic, spelling out "Fuck Birket" in an acrimonious reference to label co-founder Derek Birkett, who wanted the group to move back into more commercial territory.

In 1997 and 2001, the company also acquired some of the old Rough Trade Records and Nude Records labels, and the rights to several albums previously released by spinART Records.

=== 2000s ===
In 2009, Paul McCartney, along with Youth, released an album called Electric Arguments under the name of The Fireman through One Little Indian.

In June 2020, in response to worldwide protests following the murder of George Floyd, it was announced that the company's name would be changed from One Little Indian Records to One Little Independent Records with immediate effect, and that the company would donate money towards organisations which promote and assist Native American communities in North America. In a written statement, Birkett said:

The last few weeks have been a monumental learning curve ... Following the receipt of an eye-opening letter from a Crass fan that detailed precisely why the logo and label name are offensive, as well as the violent history of the terminology, I felt equally appalled and grateful to them for making me understand what must be changed.

== Controversies ==
In 1986, the label's reissue of the Flux of Pink Indians album The Fucking Cunts Treat Us Like Pricks was banned by several major retailers including HMV and Our Price due to its sexually explicit title and cover art. Copies of the album were seized by police from Manchester's Eastern Bloc record shop, which was charged with displaying "Obscene Articles For Publication For Gain". The label and its publishing company, Second Wind, were also charged under the Obscene Publications Act. All cases were eventually dropped.

In 1992, The Shamen's single "Ebeneezer Goode" provided the label with its first number 1 hit on the UK Charts. The Sun and The Daily Telegraph alleged that the song encouraged drug use, and the Broadcasting Standards Council ruled that it should not have been broadcast by the programme Top of the Pops.

== Notable artists ==
- Árný Margrét
- Ásgeir
- Björk
- Cody Chesnutt
- Daisy Chainsaw
- Emilíana Torrini
- Foxtrott
- Fufanu
- Gabríel Ólafs
- Galya Bisengalieva
- God Damn
- Jesse Malin
- Kathryn Williams
- Manu Delago
- Marry Waterson
- Olga Bell
- Penelope Trappes
- Queenadreena
- Sijya
- Samaris
- Sarasara
- Sinéad O'Connor
- Skunk Anansie
- The Shamen
- The Sugarcubes
- Tusks
- Wild Palms

== Reception ==
Amazing Radio has characterised the label as "consistently brilliant" and as having "a rich musical history".

== See also ==
- Category:One Little Independent Records artists
- List of independent UK record labels
- List of record labels
- Spiderleg Records
