= Spiderleg Records =

Record label from the UK

- Founded: 1981
- Distributor: Rough Trade
- Genre: anarcho-punk
- Country of origin: United Kingdom
- Location: London

Spiderleg Records was an independent record label founded by UK anarcho-punk band Flux of Pink Indians in 1981.

The band set up the label after releasing their first EP on the Crass Records label, which taught them the skills necessary to run such a project and provided them with the seed cash.

The first record to be put out was a re-recording of older material made when Flux of Pink Indians were known as The Epileptics. This was an EP entitled 1970s Have Been Made in Hong Kong, which had originally been released by the small Bishop's Stortford based label Stortbeat. However, the band fell into dispute with Stortbeat when the label allegedly re-released the single without paying the band owed royalties. The re-recording for Spiderleg is also notable for featuring Penny Rimbaud of Crass on drums as the original Epileptics drummer was not available.

The band not only used the label to release their own material, but gave opportunities to like-minded punk bands to put out records, including The Subhumans, who in a similar fashion set up their own Bluurg label. Other bands which had their first vinyl releases on Spiderleg were The System, Amebix, Antisect and Kronstadt Uprising.

Spiderleg Records had considerable success, with several hits on the UK Indie Chart, including a number one album with Flux of Pink Indians' Strive To Survive Causing The Least Suffering Possible, which also reached number 79 on the UK Album Chart.

The final releases on the label were an Antisect LP and Flux of Pink Indians EP in 1984.

In 1985, Derek Birkett, bass player of Flux of Pink Indians, his wife Sue Birkett and former Flux guitarist Tim Kelly set up the highly successful label One Little Indian Records, now known as One Little Independent Records, whose releases have included material by Björk, The Shamen, Skunk Anansie, Queen Adreena and Chumbawamba, amongst others.

== Releases ==
chart positions shown from the UK Indie Chart

- SDL 1 - The Epileptics: 1970s Have Been Made in Hong Kong EP (#21)
- SDL 2 - The Epileptics: Last Bus to Debden live 7" (#17)
- SDL 3 - The Subhumans: Demolition War EP (#13)
- SDL 4 - The System: Warfare EP (#18)
- SDL 5 - The Subhumans: Reasons for Existence EP (#11)
- SDL 6 - Amebix: Who's the Enemy EP (#33)
- SDL 7 - The Subhumans: Religious Wars EP (#7)
- SDL 8 - Flux of Pink Indians: Strive to Survive Causing Least Suffering Possible LP (#1)
- SDL 9 - The Subhumans: The Day the Country Died LP (#3)
- SDL 10 - Amebix: Winter 7" (#18)
- SDL 11 - The System: The System Is Murder 7" (#16)
- SDL 12 - Kronstadt Uprising: The Unknown Revolution EP
- SDL 13 - Flux of Pink Indians: The Fucking Cunts Treat Us Like Pricks double LP (#2)
- SDL 14 - Amebix: No Sanctuary 12" album (#9)
- SDL 15 - Antisect: In Darkness There Is No Choice LP (#3)
- SDL 16 - Flux of Pink Indians: Taking a Liberty EP (#5)

== See also ==
- List of record labels
- List of independent UK record labels
- One Little Indian Records
