= Peter Tavy =

Village in Devon, England

Coordinates: 50.579°N 4.100°W

- Village
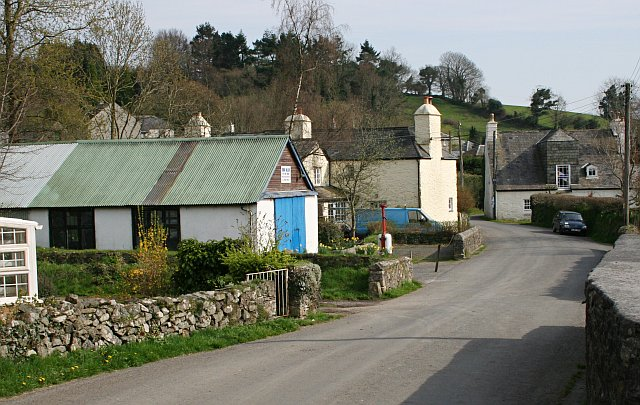
- St Mary's church

- Location within Devon
- Population: 296 (2021 census)
- Civil parish: Peter Tavy
- District: West Devon
- Shire county: Devon
- Region: South West
- Country: England
- Sovereign state: United Kingdom
- Police: Devon and Cornwall
- Fire: Devon and Somerset
- Ambulance: South Western

Peter Tavy (/ˈteɪvi/) is a village and civil parish 3 miles (4.8 km) along the A386, northeast of Tavistock, in the West Devon district, in the county of Devon, England. It is named after the River Tavy. St Peter's Parish Church is largely built of granite and has a buttressed west tower. In 2021 the parish had a population of 296.

Near Peter Tavy Moor, marked by a granite post, is the grave of George Stephens (d. 1763), who is said to have committed suicide after losing the prospect of marriage to Mary Bray, a farmer's daughter. He was buried outside the parish boundary, as was the custom for suicides, and it is said that his ghost still haunts the nearby moor to this day.

At Willsworthy is a former manor house with a chapel (converted into a house).

The village has a 15th-century inn, the Peter Tavy Inn.
