= No Sanctuary (album) =

Studio album by Amebix
- Released: November 1983
- Genre: Crust punk; post-punk
- Length: 26:35
- Label: Spiderleg Records

Amebix chronology
Who's the Enemy (1982)	No Sanctuary (1983)	Arise! (1985)

No Sanctuary is the first album by the British crust punk band Amebix. It was released in November 1983 through Spiderleg Records. It entered the Independent Albums Chart at No. 12 on 26 November 1983, and reached No. 9 the following week.

The music is one of the earliest examples of crust punk, and combines it with post-punk. The album artwork is a photograph "Grief" by Dmitry Baltermants that depicts a 1942 Nazi massacre of Jews in the Crimean city of Kerch.

The album was re-released as part of the compilation No Sanctuary: The Spiderleg Recordings in 2008 on Alternative Tentacles.

== Track listing ==
No.	Title	Length
1.	"Battery Humans"	4:05
2.	"Control"	4:02
3.	"Progress?"	3:35
4.	"Sanctuary"	3:56
5.	"The Church Is for Sinners"	3:16
6.	"Sunshine Ward"	5:48
7.	"Moscow Madness" (instrumental)	1:53

== Personnel ==
- The Baron Rockin von Aphid (Rob Miller) — bass, vocals
- Stig Da Pig (Chris Miller) — guitar
- Virus (Neil Worthington) — drums
- Norman — keyboard
