= Dick Lucas (singer) =

British singer

- Lucas (left) with Gray Madder, 1995
- Born: 21 February 1961 (age 65); Trowbridge, Wiltshire, England
- Occupation: Singer

Dick Lucas (born 21 February 1961) is a British vocalist and lyricist of several punk rock bands. He is best known for being the vocalist of the British anarcho-punk band Subhumans and the ska-punk band Citizen Fish that he co-founded in 1990.

== Biography ==
Lucas started his career as a vocalist in the Mental from March 1979 to August 1980. He then joined the Subhumans in September 1980.

With the breakup of Subhumans in the mid-1980s came another band, Culture Shock, from 1986, followed by a short silence from Lucas, after which he co-founded Citizen Fish.

In 1995, Lucas's abstract novel Write the Way Up was published (an audio version of which was released in 2012 by Bluurg Records).

During early 2010, he contributed a spoken piece about the 7 July 2005 London bombings for Global Parasite's song "Seven Seven".

Lucas also appeared in the 2007 film Punk's Not Dead, where he discussed his views on punk rock and other philosophical issues.
