= The Queers discography =

Band

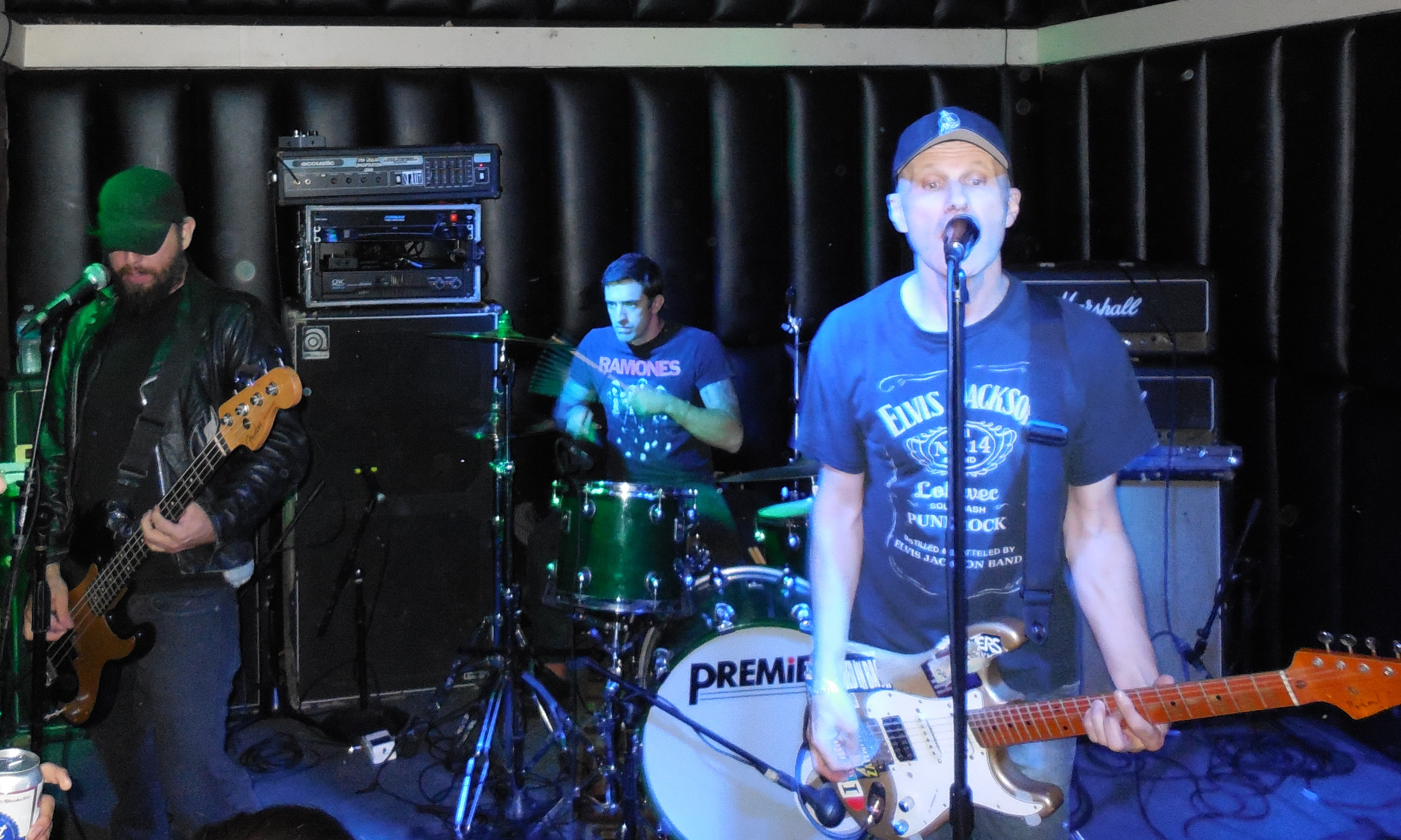
- The Queers performing in 2014
- Studio albums: 13
- EPs: 22
- Live albums: 9
- Compilation albums: 4
- Singles: 1
- Video albums: 1
- Music videos: 3
- Split albums: 1
- Other appearances: 15

The discography of the Queers, an American punk rock band, consists of 13 studio albums, 9 live albums, 4 compilation albums, 1 video album, 3 music videos, 22 EPs, 1 single, and 1 split album.

After forming in 1981, the Queers released two EPs in the early 1980s, Love Me (1982) and Kicked Out of the Webelos (1984), both on band leader Joe Queer's Doheny Records imprint. Their first album, Grow Up, was released in 1990 through British independent record label Shakin' Street Records. The band then signed to Lookout! Records, who reissued Grow Up and released the subsequent studio albums Love Songs for the Retarded (1993), Beat Off (1994), Move Back Home (1995), and Don't Back Down (1996), as well as the compilation albums A Day Late and a Dollar Short (1996) and Later Days and Better Lays (1999). The Queers also released a cover version of the Ramones' Rocket to Russia album in 1994 through Selfless Records, as well as two live albums and a number of EPs through other labels during these years.

The band then moved to Hopeless Records, releasing the studio albums Punk Rock Confidential (1998) and Beyond the Valley... (2000) and the live album Live in West Hollywood (2001). They returned to Lookout! for the Today EP (2001) and album Pleasant Screams (2002), but soon parted ways with the label again. A split album with Italian band the Manges, titled Acid Beaters, was released in 2003 through Stardumb Records, followed by 2004's stopgap album Summer Hits No. 1 on Suburban Home Records, consisting of new recordings of songs from the Queers' back catalog.

In 2006 the Queers followed several other former Lookout! artists in rescinding their master tapes and licensing rights from the label. They signed to Asian Man Records, who released their eleventh studio album, Munki Brain (2007), and also reissued all of their Lookout! albums (excepting Later Days and Better Lays), having all of them remastered (and all but A Day Late and a Dollar Short and Pleasant Screams remixed) by the band's longtime collaborator Mass Giorgini. Licensing rights to several of these reissues subsequently passed to Dayton, Ohio-based Rad Girlfriend Records. A twelfth studio album, Back to the Basement, followed on Asian Man in 2010. The Queers also released 8 split EPs with various other bands between 2004 and 2018. Most recently, the Queers re-recorded both of their Hopeless albums, issuing Beyond the Valley Revisited: Live at Loud & Clear Studios in 2016 through Asian Man and Punk Rock Confidential Revisited in 2018 through Asian Man, Rad Girlfriend, and the band's own new imprint, All Star Records.

== Studio albums ==
Year	Album details	Notes
1990	Grow Up: Released: 1990; Label: Shakin' Street (YEAH-HUP 10); Formats: LP	Reissued by Lookout! Records in 1994 on CD (LK 90), and by Asian Man Records in 2007 on LP and CD (ASM 144).
1993	Love Songs for the Retarded: Released: April 13, 1993; Label: Lookout! (LK 66); Formats: LP, CS, CD	Reissued by Asian Man Records in 2006 on CD and in 2012 on LP (ASM 136), by Recess Records in the U.S. and Gonna Puke Records in Italy in 2009 on LP (Recess 107, GPK 030), and by Rad Girlfriend Records in 2017 on CD (RGF 070).
1994	Rocket To Russia: Released: 1994; Label: Selfless (SFLS 28); Formats: LP	Limited to 2,000 copies. Reissued by Clearview Records in 1998 on CD (CRVW 28), and by Liberation Records in 2001 on CD (L 37838).
1994	Beat Off: Released: July 14, 1994; Label: Lookout! (LK 81); Formats: LP, CS, CD	Reissued by Asian Man Records in 2007 on CD and in 2014 on LP (ASM 142).
1995	Move Back Home: Released: May 10, 1995; Label: Lookout! (LK 114); Formats: LP, CS, CD	Reissued by Asian Man Records in 2007 on CD and in 2013 on LP (ASM 143), and by Recess Records in 2007 on LP (Recess 132).
1996	Don't Back Down: Released: August 27, 1996; Label: Lookout! (LK 140); Formats: LP, CS, CD	Reissued by Asian Man Records in 2007 on CD and in 2012 on LP (ASM 146), and by Rad Girlfriend Records in 2017 on CD (RGF 071).
1998	Punk Rock Confidential: Released: October 6, 1998; Label: Hopeless (HR 636); Formats: LP, CS, CD	
2000	Beyond The Valley...: Released: May 16, 2000; Label: Hopeless (HR 643); Formats: LP, CD	
2002	Pleasant Screams: Released: April 9, 2002; Label: Lookout! (LK 270); Formats: LP, CD	Reissued by Asian Man Records in 2007 on CD (ASM 147), and by Rad Girlfriend Records in 2017 on CD (RGF 072).
2004	Summer Hits No. 1: Released: October 19, 2004; Label: Suburban Home (SHM 8041); Formats: CD	
2007	Munki Brain: Released: February 6, 2007; Label: Asian Man (ASM 141); Formats: CD	Issued on LP by Recess Records (Recess 106), and on CD in Spain by MediaDavid Production (MD 0002) and in Switzerland Leech Records (LEECH 073).
2010	Back to the Basement: Released: November 16, 2010; Label: Asian Man (AM 210); Formats: LP, CD	
2018	Punk Rock Confidential Revisited: Released: 2018; Label: All Star / Asian Man / Rad Girlfriend (RGF 078); Formats: LP, CD	
2020	Save The World	
2021	Reverberation	

== Live albums ==
Year	Album details	Notes
1994	Shout at the Queers: Released: 1994; Label: Selfless (SFLS 28); Formats: LP	Limited to 666 copies. The first 100 copies included the "Love Me" / "Louie Louie" single.
1995	Suck This: Released: 1995; Label: Clearview (CRVW 37); Formats: LP, CD	
2001	Live in West Hollywood: Released: October 2, 2001; Label: Hopeless (HR 658); Formats: CD	
2006	Weekend at Bernie's: Released: May 21, 2006; Label: Doheny (DR 004); Formats: CD	
2008	CBGB OMFUG Masters: Live February 3, 2003 – The Bowery Collection: Released: 2008; Label: MVD Audio (MVDA 4671); Formats: CD	
2009	Alive in Hollyweird: Released: March 24, 2009; Label: Punk Rock Social (PRS 001); Formats: CD/DVD	
2010	Live in Philly '06: Released: 2010; Label: Universal Warning (UWR 027); Formats: LP	
2013	Olé Maestro: Released: 2013; Label: MediaDavid Produccions (MD CD007); Formats: CD	
2016	Beyond the Valley Revisited: Live at Loud & Clear Studios: Released: 2016; Label: Asian Man (AM 294); Formats: LP	

== Compilation albums ==
Year	Album details	Notes
1992	A Proud Tradition: Released: 1992; Label: Doheny (U33568M); Formats: 7"	Combines the EPs Love Me (1982) and Kicked Out of the Webelos (1984). Reissued by Selfless Records in 1993 (SFLS 21).
1994	Limited Edition Double Pack: Released: 1994; Label: Doheny (E404Y07) / Selfless (SFLS 27); Formats: 7"	Limited to 400 copies. Combines a bootleg version of Kicked Out of the Webelos with the mis-pressed version of Too Dumb to Quit!
1996	A Day Late and a Dollar Short: Released: January 23, 1996; Label: Lookout! (LK 130); Formats: CD	Reissued by Asian Man Records in 2007 (ASM 145).
1999	Later Days and Better Lays: Released: March 23, 1999; Label: Lookout! (LK 216); Formats: CD	

== Video albums ==
Year	Album details
2007	The Queers Are Here: Released: February 20, 2007; Label: MVD Visual (DR 4545); Formats: DVD

== Music videos ==
Year	Song	Director	Album
1996	"Don't Back Down"	Isaac Camner	Don't Back Down
1996	"Punk Rock Girls"	Jennifer Kaufman	Don't Back Down
1998	"Tamara Is a Punk"		Punk Rock Confidential

== EPs ==
Year	Album details	Notes
1982	Love Me: Released: 1982; Label: Doheny (E210X85); Formats: 7"	
1984	Kicked Out of the Webelos: Released: 1984; Label: Doheny (E404Y07); Formats: 7"	
1993	Too Dumb to Quit!: Released: 1993; Label: Doheny (U35835M); Formats: 7"	Reissued by Selfless Records in 1994 (SFLS 27); 500 copies were mis-pressed with a jazz recording on the B-side, and released with the title It's Not Our Fault.
1993	Live in Chicago 4/18/93: Released: 1993; Label: V.M.L. (VML 002); Formats: 7"	Limited to 1,500 copies.
1994	The Queers / Pink Lincolns – Live at Some Prick's House: Released: 1994; Label: Just Add Water (JAW 001); Formats: 7"	
1994	Look Ma No Flannel!: Released: 1994; Label: Clearview (CRVW 35); Formats: 7"	
1995	Surf Goddess: Released: February 20, 1995; Label: Lookout! (LK 108); Formats: 7", CD	
1995	2/24/95, Fireside Bowl – Chicago, IL: Released: 1995; Label: V.M.L. (V.M.LIVE 001); Formats: 7"	
1995	My Old Man's a Fatso: Released: 1995; Label: Woundup (WR 07); Formats: 7"	
1995	The Queers / Sinkhole – Love Ain't Punk: Released: 1995; Label: Ringing Ear (RER 008); Formats: 7"	
1996	Bubblegum Dreams: Released: July 1996; Label: Lookout! (LK 158); Formats: 7"	
1998	Everything's O.K.: Released: May 19, 1998; Label: Hopeless (HR 631); Formats: 7", CD	
1998	88 Fingers Louie / The Queers – Right on Target: Released: 1998; Label: Hopeless; Formats: CD	
2001	Today: Released: February 20, 2001; Label: Lookout! (LK 260); Formats: CD	
2004	Disgusteens / The Queers – Split Disc from Japan & USA: Released: August 25, 2004; Label: Stiffeen (SRCD 1028); Formats: CD	
2008	The Queers / The Hotlines: Released: August 25, 2008; Label: Devil's Jukebox (DJB 66617); Formats: 7"	
2009	The Queers & The Atom Age: Released: 2009; Label: Asian Man (AM 180); Formats: 7"	
2011	The Queers / The Riptides – Buy It You Scum: Released: 2011; Label: Asian Man; Formats: 7"	
2011	The Queers and Killtime: Released: 2011; Label: Gonna Puke (GPK 032); Formats: 7"	
2015	The Queers / Antagonizers ATL: Released: 2015; Label: Sexy Baby (SBR 1033); Formats: 7"	
2017	The Queers Regret Making a Record with Bassamp & Dano: Released: 2017; Label: Failure Records & Tapes (FR&T 031); Formats: 7"	
2018	The Queers / Chris Barrows: Released: April 21, 2018; Label: Rad Girlfriend (RGF 075); Formats: 7"	

== Singles ==
Year	Release details	Notes
1994	"Love Me" / "Louie Louie": Released: 1994; Label: Selfless; Formats: 7"	Limited to 100 copies, included with the first 100 copies of Shout at the Queers.

== Split albums ==
Year	Album details
2003	Acid Beaters: Released: November 4, 2003; Label: Stardumb (SDR 35); Formats: LP

== Other appearances ==
The following Queers songs were released on compilation albums. This is not an exhaustive list; songs that originally appeared on the band's albums, EPs, or singles are not included.

Year	Release details	Track(s)
1992	Blame and Burn: Released: 1992; Label: Flush (FPV 003); Format: 7"	"I Live This Life"
1994	Punk USA: Released: May 6, 1994; Label: Lookout! (LK 77); Format: LP, CS, CD	"Blabbermouth"
1995	Water Music: Released: 1995; Label: Just Add Water (JAW 002); Format: CD	"I Met Her at the Rat" (single version)
1996	Here Comes the Summer: The Undertones Tribute Compilation: Released: 1996; Label: Munster (MR 103)/Square Target (STD 05); Format: LP, CD	"Get Over You" (originally performed by the Undertones)
1996	Pipeline! Live Boston Rock on WMBR: Released: April 12, 1996; Label: Slow River (VA 016); Format: CD	"I Met Her at the Rat" (live)
1997	More Bounce to the Ounce: Released: June 24, 1997; Label: Lookout! (LK 154); Format: LP, CD	"The Kids Are Alright" (originally performed by the Who); "This Sandal Shit Has Got to Stop"
1998	Hopelessly Devoted to You Too: Released: May 19, 1998; Label: Hopeless (HR 632); Format: CD	"Like a Parasite" (non-album version)
1999	Short Music for Short People: Released: June 1, 1999; Label: Fat Wreck Chords (FAT 591); Format: LP, CD	"I Hate Your Fucking Guts"
2000	Hopelessly Devoted to You Vol. 3: Released: October 3, 2000; Label: Hopeless (HR 648); Format: CD	"Rip It Up" (originally performed by Little Richard)
2003	Serving the Best in Rock & Roll: Released: 2003; Label: Peephole (PEEP 001); Format: CD	"Baby Girl"
2004	That's Life! At the Wild at Heart, Vol. 2: Released: 2004; Label: Wild at Heart (WAH 003); Format: CD	"This Place Sucks" (live)
2006	We'll Inherit the Earth: A Tribute to the Replacements: Released: October 3, 2006; Label: 1-2-3-4 Go! (GO! 21); Format: CD	"Unsatisfied" (originally performed by the Replacements)
2007	Let's Do It for Lance!: Released: 2007; Label: Jerk Off (JO 0014) / Vinehell (VH 015) / No Idea / Cat Food Money / Tic Tac Totally; Format: CD	"About the She" (originally performed by J Church)
2008	A Tribute to Unnatural Axe: Ruling the World from the Backseat: Released: 2008; Label: Lawless (LL 008); Format: LP	"No Surfin' in Dorchester Bay" (originally performed by Unnatural Axe)
2009	Insubordination Fest: Baltimore MD '08: Released: 2008; Label: Insubordination (ISR 080); Format: CD/DVD	"Girl About Town" (live, originally performed by Helen Love)
