= Don't Back Down (album) =

- Left to right on the cover: Hugh O'Neill, Joe Queer, and B-Face

Studio album by the Queers
- Released: August 27, 1996
- Recorded: May 3–11, 1996
- Studios: Big Sound, Westbrook, Maine
- Genre: Punk rock
- Length: 40:54
- Label: Lookout! (LK 140)
- Producers: Larry Livermore, Mass Giorgini, JJ Rassler

The Queers chronology
Bubblegum Dreams (1996)	Don't Back Down (1996)	Everything's O.K. (1998)

Don't Back Down is the sixth studio album by the American punk rock band the Queers, released in August 1996 by Lookout! Records. The band and Lookout! president Larry Livermore, who served as executive producer, sought to balance the sounds of the Ramones and the Beach Boys, and enlisted the help of former Queers guitarist JJ Rassler and Cub singer Lisa Marr. The album's title track is a cover version of the Beach Boys song of the same name; it also features covers of the Hondells' "Little Sidewalk Surfer Girl" and Hawaiian punk band the Catalogs' "Another Girl". The album produced the band's first music videos, for "Punk Rock Girls" and "Don't Back Down".

Don't Back Down was the final Queers album with the lineup of singer and guitarist "Joe Queer" King, bassist Chris "B-Face" Barnard, and drummer Hugh O'Neill, and the last of four albums the band recorded for Lookout! during the 1990s. After its release, the band fractured over the possibility of signing to another label. King, who had been the only constant member since the band's formation, continued with new members and signed the group to Hopeless Records. The Queers returned to Lookout! in 2001 for the Today EP and the album Pleasant Screams, but soon parted ways with the label again. After they rescinded their master recordings from Lookout! in 2006, Don't Back Down was reissued by Asian Man Records the following year, having been remixed and remastered by producer Mass Giorgini and with the tracks from the Bubblegum Dreams EP added.

== Background and writing ==
For the Queers' first album for Lookout!, 1993's Love Songs for the Retarded, the band had entered the studio with a fully developed and rehearsed set of songs. It went on to become their highest-selling album, with sales surpassing 100,000 copies. Their subsequent two Lookout! albums, while selling well, suffered from rushed writing and production: For 1994's Beat Off, recorded in Chicago, producer Ben Weasel insisted on a no-frills punk rock sound, eschewing the guitar and vocal overdubs which label head Larry Livermore felt "were fundamental to their Beach Boys-meet-the-Ramones style". 1995's Move Back Home, recorded in Lafayette, Indiana and produced by Livermore, was marred by the band's issues with heroin; many of the songs were written in the studio, and Livermore was so dissatisfied with the result that he removed his name from the album. Lookout!'s Chris Appelgren also felt that Move Back Home failed to progress the band's songwriting. Reflecting on these albums in 2007, band leader Joe King (a.k.a. Joe Queer) called both "mediocre" and said that they did not measure up to albums being put out by their peers and labelmates, especially Weasel's band Screeching Weasel and the Mr. T Experience, led by "Dr. Frank" Portman: "We knew we were capable of more. We had to show we could run with the big dogs. Ben Weasel and Dr. Frank were hitting a home run every time they stepped up to the plate so felt we had something to prove."

For the band's next album, both Queer and Livermore were determined to strike a balance between the styles of the Ramones and Beach Boys. Queer reached out to JJ Rassler, who had been the Queers' guitarist in the mid- to late 1980s and played on the band's first album, Grow Up (1990). "Me and Joe's past history proves, among other things, that we are dyed in the wool Beach Boys fans, with the exception of Mike Love", wrote Rassler in 2007, citing The Beach Boys Today! as their favorite album; "So I figured this held potential for serious fun. We traded cassettes of song ideas and over the next couple weeks got a core of collaborative tunes that we could add to those he'd already written." Livermore flew across the country from Berkeley, California, Queer came south from his home in Portsmouth, New Hampshire, and they met at Rassler's home in Boston to work on song arrangements. Rassler suggested covering "Little Sidewalk Surfer Girl", a 1965 surf single by the Hondells. Queer also reached out to Lisa Marr, whose Vancouver-based band Cub was releasing records through Lookout! and had toured with the Queers and the Muffs in August 1995. Exchanging cassette tapes by mail, the two co-wrote "I Can't Get Over You": "He sent me a cassette tape with the chorus and the music and I wrote the verses", recalled Marr; "It was one of those absolutely effortless songs that seem to write themselves." Queer had the idea for he and Marr to sing vocal harmonies on the song in the style of the Association.

Rassler joined the Queers to rehearse the songs at a studio in Portsmouth. Bassist Chris "B-Face" Barnard had the idea to cover the Beach Boys' 1964 song "Don't Back Down", which became the title of the album. A music video was later released for the song, directed by Isaac Camner and inspired by the beach party films of the 1960s, with the band performing on a beach to a group of dancers, sunbathers, and surfers. They also covered "Another Girl" by Hawaiian punk band the Catalogs; at the time, the original song was only available on a cassette tape that the Catalogs sold at their shows (after the song gained recognition by being covered on Don't Back Down, the Catalogs recorded a new version for wider release on an EP, but it went unreleased until 2008). The rest of the album would consist of, according to Queer, "typical Queers fare" such as "No Tit", "I'm OK, You're Fucked", and a new recording of the Grow Up song "Love Love Love". "Born to Do Dishes" had previously been recorded in a demo session with producer Jim Tierney; the band wrote the song in the studio in only 5 minutes. This recording, along with an early demo of "No Tit", were later released on the 1999 compilation album Later Days and Better Lays.

== Recording ==
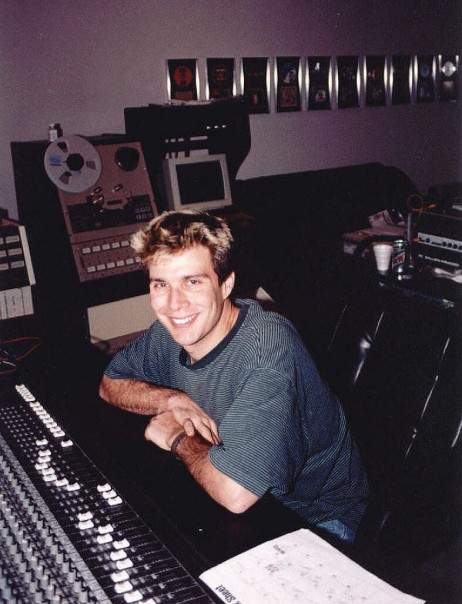
Mass Giorgini recorded, mixed, and produced Don't Back Down.

Rather than traveling to Chicago or Lafayette, as they had for their previous four studio albums, the Queers wanted to record Don't Back Down closer to their home in Portsmouth. Livermore insisted that they use audio engineer Mass Giorgini, who had recorded Love Songs for the Retarded, Beat Off, and Move Back Home. "We had made a conscious decision not to use Mass but at least we were in a different studio", recalled Queer; "He did a great job but we were adamant that myself, [drummer Hugh O'Neill], and JJ produce. We wanted a more raw sound, indicative of the way the band sounded [live]." The album was recorded May 3–11 at Big Sound Studios in Westbrook, Maine. Livermore was present and served as executive producer as well as recording handclaps, while Giorgini and Rassler were credited as the album's producers; Giorgini also recorded and mixed the sessions, while Rassler performed additional guitar and vocals on the album. Lisa Marr joined the band in the studio to sing backing vocals, and performed lead vocals on "I Can't Get Over You" while Queer sang the backing vocals; an alternate take of the song, with Queer on lead vocals and Marr on backups, was later released on Later Days and Better Lays. "We added Brill Building touches to counterbalance the harder tunes like 'No Tit'", said Rassler, "and layered background vocals like on 'Little Honda'—that was a blast to record."

The last song recorded for the album was "Punk Rock Girls". Queer had not completed the lyrics, and reached out to Frank Portman for help; unable to get in contact with Portman, he completed the lyrics in just a few minutes' time, referencing Portman in the line "Me and Dr. Frank have both decided that we love them more than toast" (referring to the Mr. T Experience song "More Than Toast" on their 1993 album Our Bodies Our Selves). Chris Horne of Portland, Maine garage rock band the Brood played Farfisa organ on the track. The song's lead vocals were the last thing recorded for the album. "As soon as I did it we knew it was a killer track", recalled Queer. A music video, the band's first, was filmed for the song, directed by Jennifer Kaufman and with a cameo appearance by Portman. "Punk Rock Girls" was also chosen to lead off the Bubblegum Dreams EP, which was released a month ahead of the album and also included three outtakes from the sessions: the original song "Never Ever Ever" and cover versions of the Beach Boys' "Little Honda" and the Muffs' "End It All", with Marr singing backing vocals.

Around the same time as the Don't Back Down sessions, Joe Queer was putting together a compilation album for Lookout! titled More Bounce to the Ounce, bringing various bands into Portsmouth's Fishtracks Studio to record. Cletus, a band from Charleston, South Carolina, recorded a cover version of the Queers' "Granola-Head" for the album. Cletus singer Johnny Puke, who openly used heroin and at whose apartment shock rocker GG Allin had died from an accidental heroin overdose in 1993, changed the lyric "hanging out and getting drunk" to "hanging out and shooting junk". Livermore, who was in the studio, objected to this, especially in light of the Queers' previous issues with heroin use, and refused to release the song with that lyric. Puke protested, yelling "I'll fucking kick your ass right here, Livermore!", but ultimately relented and sang the song with the original lyrics. During the recording of Don't Back Down, Queer was clowning around in between takes doing impressions of Puke's rant, and Giorgini recorded him saying "He didn't say that, he said 'I'll kick your fucking ass right here, Livermore!'" This, along with some other studio banter, was added to the compact disc release of Don't Back Down as a hidden track.

== Reception ==
Reviewing the album for AllMusic, critic Kembrew McLeod rated it 4 1/2 stars out of 5, saying "It doesn't get any better than this. On Don't Back Down the rip-roaring punk songs with no melody ('No Tit', for instance) are more than counterbalanced by the many mind-blowingly catchy songs ('Punk Rock Girls', 'Number One', 'Janelle, Janelle', ad nauseam). Some of the songs, dare it be said, even surpass many of Brian Wilson's perfect pop songs." Reflecting on the album in 2014, Lookout!'s Chris Appelgren, who had done its layout, said that it "was not a misstep in any way. For [it] we all agreed not to fuck around. Loving the Beach Boys as I do, it really spoke to me. I loved the photos and the simple art we did and the response was great. Joe is always talking about different cool projects and sometimes they come together, sometimes they don't, but inspired by Dr. Frank and Ben Weasel, riding a wave of successful touring, being clean and just kicking ass, they cut what I think is the band's best album."

Joe Queer recalled that the album was well-received and, along with the wave of popularity that Lookout! was experiencing in the mid-1990s, helped the band reach a wider audience: "Once it was recorded we knew we had a good album. The fans liked it, so it was great. Shows got bigger and reviews were good. It was a good time. Felt good to move on musically too." The album's success attracted the attention of Epitaph Records head Brett Gurewitz, who offered to sign the band. This led to a dispute with Lookout! and disagreements between the band members, resulting in the dissolution of this lineup of the Queers. Barnard, who had been with the Queers since 1990, joined the Groovie Ghoulies. O'Neill, who had been with the band since 1986 (minus a forced leave of absence in 1993–1994 to deal with his heroin addiction), completed drug rehabilitation but was diagnosed with a brain tumor and died in early 1999. The Epitaph deal having fallen through, Queer, who had also completed drug rehabilitation, formed a new lineup of the Queers and signed the band to Hopeless Records. The band returned to Lookout! for the 2001 Today EP and 2002 album Pleasant Screams, but chose to again leave the label, which by that time was floundering.

== Reissue ==
In 2006 the Queers followed several other former Lookout! artists in rescinding their master tapes and licensing rights from the label, invoking a clause in their contract citing delinquent royalty payments. They signed to Asian Man Records, who reissued all of the band's Lookout! albums in 2007, each having been remixed and remastered by Giorgini at his Sonic Iguana Studio in Lafayette, Indiana. For Don't Back Down's reissue, Queer and Rassler wrote liner notes reflecting on the writing and recording of the album, and the tracks from the Bubblegum Dreams EP were added as bonus tracks. Reviewing the reissue for Punknews.org, reviewer Tom Trauma rated it 4 1/2 stars out of 5, saying "Love Songs for the Retarded might be the Queers' most popular album, but Don't Back Down isn't far behind. It remains a definitive document of what summer is supposed to sound like."

== Track listing ==
Writing credits adapted from the album's liner notes.

No.	Title	Writer(s)	Length
1.	"No Tit"	Joe Queer, Chris "B-Face" Barnard, Hugh O'Neill	1:29
2.	"Punk Rock Girls"	Queer	2:42
3.	"I'm OK, You're Fucked"	Queer, B-Face, O'Neill	1:00
4.	"Number One"	Queer, JJ Rassler	3:10
5.	"Don't Back Down" (originally performed by the Beach Boys)	Brian Wilson, Mike Love	1:58
6.	"I Only Drink Bud"	Queer, B-Face, O'Neill	2:05
7.	"I Always Knew"	Queer	2:57
8.	"Born to Do Dishes"	Queer, B-Face, O'Neill, Jim Teirney	1:56
9.	"Janelle, Janelle"	Queer, Rassler	2:44
10.	"Brush Your Teeth"	Queer, B-Face, O'Neill	1:16
11.	"Sidewalk Surfin' Girl" (originally performed by the Hondells as "Little Sidewalk Surfer Girl")	Mike Curb, Harley Hatcher	2:00
12.	"Another Girl" (originally performed by the Catalogs)	Les Hernandez	1:47
13.	"Love Love Love"	Queer	2:47
14.	"I Can't Get Over You" (featuring Lisa Marr; followed by a hidden track of studio banter)	Queer, Rassler, Lisa Marr	13:03
Total length:			40:54

Bonus tracks on 2007 reissue, from the Bubblegum Dreams EP (1996)
No.	Title	Writer(s)	Length
15.	"Never Ever Ever"	Queer, Rassler	3:09
16.	"Little Honda" (originally performed by the Beach Boys)	Wilson, Love	2:32
17.	"End It All" (originally performed by the Muffs; followed by a hidden track of studio banter)	Kim Shattuck	12:35
Total length:			49:03

== Personnel ==
Credits adapted from the album's liner notes.

The Queers

- Joe Queer (Joe King) – lead vocals, guitar
- B-Face (Chris Barnard) – bass guitar, backing vocals
- Hugh O'Neill – drums

Additional performers

- JJ Rassler – guitar, backing vocals, producer
- Lisa Marr – backing vocals, lead vocals on "I Can't Get Over You"
- Chris Horne – Farfisa organ

Production

- Larry Livermore – executive producer, handclaps
- Mass Giorgini – audio engineer, mixing engineer, producer; remixing and remastering of 2007 reissue

Artwork

- Nancy Horton – photographs
- Chris Appelgren – layout
- Skylar Suorez – layout of 2007 reissue
