= Later Days and Better Lays =

Compilation album by The Queers
- Released: March 23, 1999
- Recorded: 1991–1996
- Genre: Punk rock
- Label: Lookout! (LK 216)
- Producers: Jim Tierney, Mass Giorgini

The Queers chronology
Punk Rock Confidential (1998)	Later Days and Better Lays (1999)	Beyond the Valley... (2000)

Later Days and Better Lays is a compilation album by the American punk rock band the Queers, released in March 1999 by Lookout! Records. It combines a 14-song demo tape from 1991 with some demos recorded in the lead-up to their 1996 album Don't Back Down, as well as some outtakes from that album's recording sessions. The compilation fulfilled the band's contractual obligations to Lookout!, following seven years and four studio albums on the label. They moved on to Hopeless Records, but would return to Lookout! for the Today EP (2001) and album Pleasant Screams (2002) before parting ways with the label again.

== Background and material ==
=== 1991 demo ===
The first 14 tracks on Later Days and Better Lays comprise a demo tape that the Queers had recorded in May 1991 with producer Jim Tierney. The band had gone through a number of lineup changes and periods of inactivity since forming in 1982, before the lineup of singer, songwriter, and guitarist "Joe Queer" King, drummer Hugh O'Neill, and bassist Chris "B-Face" Barnard solidified in 1990. By 1991 King was co-owner of a café and bar in Exeter, New Hampshire called Joe's Place, where O'Neill and Barnard worked as dishwashers. Around this time King befriended Ben Weasel, whose band Screeching Weasel soon signed to Berkeley, California-based Lookout! Records. The Queers' goals at the time were modest: "Things were desperate", King later recalled, "I made no money to speak of. We just wanted to do one great punk rock album that we'd release ourselves and play with Screeching Weasel at least once."

To this end, the band recorded the demo tape of new material and sent it to Weasel, who passed a copy on to Lookout! head Larry Livermore and suggested that he sign the Queers to the label. "The songs were irresistibly melodic;" Livermore recalled in his 2015 memoir, "a couple of the slower numbers, heavily influenced by doo-wop and the Beach Boys, were almost heartbreakingly beautiful. Joe King was ten years younger than me, but we'd obviously grown up listening to a lot of the same music." He felt the demo was almost good enough to put out itself, but thought it worth getting the band into a studio to re-record it with better production. The Queers signed to Lookout!, and recorded their 1993 album Love Songs for the Retarded at Sonic Iguana Studio in Lafayette, Indiana with audio engineer Mass Giorgini, produced by Weasel and with Livermore present for the sessions. Nine songs from the 1991 demo were re-recorded for the album ("Granola Head", "I Hate Everything", "I Won't Be", "I Can't Stop Farting", "Night of the Livid Queers", "Monster Zero", "Teenage Bonehead", "Hi Mom It's Me", and "Feeling Groovy"). In the liner notes for Later Days and Better Lays, King opined that the material on the demo tape was better in some respects because the band had been more relaxed and not as rushed as they were during the album session.

Another song from the demo, "Nobody Likes Me", was written during the band's formative years in the early 1980s. A version recorded in January 1993 with original member Wimpy Rutherford (real name Jack Hayes) on lead vocals was released on the 1994 EP Look Ma No Flannel! Three other songs from the demo tape ("Too Many Twinkies", "Half Shitfaced", and "I Live This Life") were re-recorded for the band's second album for Lookout!, 1994's Beat Off. The recordings of "Nobody Likes Me", "Too Many Twinkies", "Half Shitfaced", and "I Live This Life" from the 1991 demo were included on the 1996 compilation A Day Late and a Dollar Short.

=== Don't Back Down demos and outtakes ===
The remaining seven tracks on Later Days and Better Lays were recorded just prior to and during the sessions for the band's fourth Lookout! album, 1996's Don't Back Down. "Born to Do Dishes" was recorded in a late-night demo session with Tierney; the band wrote the song in the studio in only 5 minutes. The next day, fellow Lookout! acts the Mr. T Experience and the Riverdales were performing in town (along with Boris the Sprinkler), so King invited Mr. T Experience frontman "Dr. Frank" Portman to record harmony on the song's chorus. An early demo version of "No Tit" is also included on Later Days and Better Lays; both "No Tit" and "Born to Do Dishes" were re-recorded for Don't Back Down. Also included on Later Days and Better Lays is a new recording of "Junk Freak", a song from the Queers' 1990 debut album, Grow Up; this version was recorded prior to Don't Back Down when the band needed a song for inclusion in a video, but they never finished the recording and King did not add his vocals until completing the track for inclusion on this compilation.

The Don't Back Down outtakes include three tracks previously released on 1996's Bubblegum Dreams EP: the original song "Never Ever" and cover versions of the Beach Boys' "Little Honda" and the Muffs' "End It All", with Lisa Marr of the band Cub singing backing vocals. Later Days and Better Lays also includes an alternate vocal version of "I Can't Get Over You": On the version used on Don't Back Down, Marr sang the lead vocals and King sang the backups; on this alternate version, King sang the leads and Marr the backups. Finally, a cover version of the Beach Boys' "God Only Knows" (another Don't Back Down outtake) is included as a hidden track.

The success of Don't Back Down attracted the attention of Epitaph Records head Brett Gurewitz, who offered to sign the band. This led to a dispute with Lookout! and disagreements between the band members, resulting in the dissolution of this lineup of the Queers. Barnard, who had been with the Queers since 1990, joined the Groovie Ghoulies. O'Neill, who had been with the band since 1985 (minus a forced leave of absence in 1993–1994 to deal with heroin addiction), completed drug rehabilitation but was diagnosed with a brain tumor and died in early 1999. The Epitaph deal having fallen through, Queer, who had also completed drug rehabilitation, formed a new lineup of the Queers and signed the band to Hopeless Records. The band was still under contract to do one more album for Lookout!, however, so King put together Later Days and Better Lays to fulfill this obligation. The Queers returned to Lookout! for the 2001 Today EP and 2002 album Pleasant Screams, but chose to again leave the label, which by that time was floundering.

== Reception ==
Reviewing the album for The Washington Post, Mark Jenkins wrote that "the Queers have always kept it simple and stupid, but these demos reveal that they started with all the chops necessary for blitzkrieg boppers like 'I Hate Everything' and 'Nobody Likes Me.'" Mike DaRonco of AllMusic rated it 2 1/2 stars out of 5, remarking that "The snotty, 12-year old Ramones mentality is still there, but the sound quality and production isn't; they are demos, after all. Casual fans are better off just buying Love Songs [for the Retarded], but if you're a dedicated fan, add Later Days and Better Lays to the collection." Scott Heisel of Punknews.org also rated it 2 1/2 stars out of 5, calling it "interesting, but not innovative. All the recording session songs have been left as they were, with no polishing at all, which gives it that famous rough Queers sound, but it's nothing we haven't heard before. There are also some alternate versions of songs on here with different words, vocals, etc., which makes this more of a die-hard collectors' item than anything else."

== Track listing ==
All tracks are written by Joe Queer, except where noted

No.	Title	Length
1.	"Granola Head"	2:17
2.	"I Hate Everything"	1:51
3.	"Murder in the Brady House" (written by Ben Weasel; originally performed by Screeching Weasel)	2:06
4.	"I Won't Be"	2:12
5.	"Nobody Likes Me"	2:14
6.	"I Can't Stop Farting"	1:46
7.	"Night of the Livid Queers"	2:30
8.	"Monster Zero"	3:11
9.	"Too Many Twinkies"	2:01
10.	"Teenage Bonehead"	2:53
11.	"Half Shitfaced"	2:09
12.	"Hi Mom It's Me"	1:05
13.	"I Live This Life"	1:57
14.	"Feeling Groovy"	2:22
15.	"Born to Do Dishes"	2:04
16.	"Junk Freak"	3:26
17.	"No Tit"	1:23
18.	"Little Honda" (written by Brian Wilson and Mike Love; originally performed by the Beach Boys)	2:49
19.	"End It All" (written by Kim Shattuck; originally performed by the Muffs)	2:29
20.	"I Can't Get Over You" (written by Queer and Lisa Marr)	3:05
21.	"Never Ever" (written by Queer and JJ Rassler; followed by the hidden track "God Only Knows", written by Wilson and Tony Asher, originally performed by the Beach Boys)	7:56
Total length:		53:46

- Tracks 5, 9, 11, and 13 previously released on A Day Late and a Dollar Short
- Tracks 18, 19, and 21 previously released on Bubblegum Dreams
- The remaining tracks, including the hidden track, are previously unreleased

== Personnel ==
Credits adapted from the album's liner notes and those of Don't Back Down and Bubblegum Dreams.

The Queers

- Joe Queer (Joe King) – lead vocals, guitar
- B-Face (Chris Barnard) – bass guitar, backing vocals
- Hugh O'Neill – drums

Additional performers

- Frank Portman – backing vocals on "Born to Do Dishes"
- JJ Rassler – extra guitar, backing vocals, and producer on tracks 18–21
- Lisa Marr – backing vocals on tracks 18–21

Production

- Jim Tierney – producer of tracks 1–17
- Mass Giorgini – audio engineer, mixing engineer, and producer of tracks 18–21
- Larry Livermore – executive producer of tracks 18–21
