= Beat Off =

Studio album by the Queers
- Released: July 14, 1994
- Recorded: April 1–7, 1994
- Studio: Flat Iron (Chicago)
- Genre: Punk rock
- Length: 24:53
- Label: Lookout! (LK 81)
- Producer: Ben Weasel

The Queers chronology
Shout at the Queers (1994)	Beat Off (1994)	Surf Goddess (1995)

Alternative cover
- Cover of the 2007 reissue

Beat Off is the fourth studio album by the American punk rock band the Queers, released in 1994 by Lookout! Records. Recorded during a time when the Queers' usual drummer, Hugh O'Neill, was on a forced leave of absence from the band to deal with heroin addiction, it featured Screeching Weasel drummer Dan Panic and guitarist Dan Vapid added to the lineup. It was the third and final Queers album produced by Screeching Weasel singer Ben Weasel, who insisted on a no-frills punk sound for the album and removed Vapid's tracks from the final mix without his knowledge.

After the Queers rescinded their master recordings from Lookout! in 2006, Beat Off was reissued by Asian Man Records the following year, having been remixed and remastered by recording engineer Mass Giorgini.

== Background ==
The Queers had a reputation as heavy drinkers and regular drug users, and by 1993 the members had developed problems with heroin use. Lookout! Records head Larry Livermore, who was in the studio with the band for 1993's Love Songs for the Retarded and for Beat Off, later recalled that singer and songwriter Joe King had decided to sober up, but that while he was able to cut back his alcohol consumption, heroin remained an issue for both him and drummer Hugh O'Neill:

When Joe decided to clean up, there would be no half measures. The guy who'd helped litter the cover of Love Songs for the Retarded with empty Budweiser bottles laid down the law: no booze allowed in the studio or backstage anytime he was playing, recording, or practicing. Joe talked a good game about alcohol, but his real problem, like Hugh's, was drugs. I would never see him take another drink, but there would be times when it was painfully obvious he was messed up on junk. When he stayed clean—which, to his credit, was most of the time—he was a joy to work with. But as soon as heroin re-entered the picture, his songwriting would dry up, he'd grow irritable and contentious, and there'd be little point in even trying to talk to him.

King was trying to quit heroin, and staged an intervention for O'Neill involving Livermore and several of O'Neill's friends and family members. "The intervention felt doubly awkward", wrote Livermore, "because Joe, who'd organized and led it, hadn't been off heroin that long himself." O'Neill was forced to take a leave of absence from the band to deal with his addiction. Jay Adelberg, drummer of the Hartford, Connecticut-based band Forklift, filled in with the Queers, performing on the live album Shout at the Queers; their cover version of the Ramones' 1977 album Rocket to Russia (released as part of Selfless Records' Ramones covers album series); and "Blabbermouth", their contribution to the 1994 Ben Weasel-curated compilation album Punk USA.

The Beat Off recording sessions were scheduled to take place partway through a U.S. tour, but O'Neill was once again sidelined by addiction. The Queers therefore called upon Screeching Weasel drummer Dan Panic, and also added his bandmate Dan Vapid as a second guitarist. "Hugh was strung out and couldn't do the tour", recalled King in 2014, "so Panic and Vapid jumped in. We had to do an album in the middle of the tour and just used Panic 'cause he was there. He was a bit busy on drums but kept a steady beat. Weird fucker to tour with; Vapid, me, and [bassist Chris "B-Face" Barnard] were like a gang, and then there was Panic. We used to laugh at him because he was so strange. I did like him a lot, though, and I know he drove Ben crazy and I could see why, but I always liked Panic." In addition to Beat Off, Panic and Vapid would perform on the Queers' subsequent live album, Suck This (1995), and Vapid—having been forced out of Screeching Weasel—would play on 1995's Surf Goddess EP.

== Recording ==
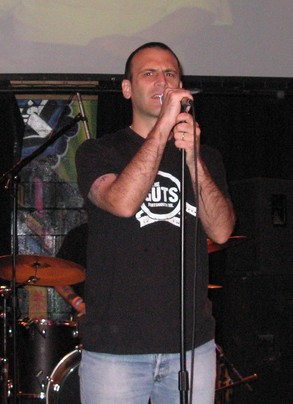
Beat Off was the third and final Queers album produced by Ben Weasel (pictured in 2007).

Beat Off was recorded and mixed from April 1 to April 7, 1994, at Flat Iron Studios in Chicago, with Mark Schwartz and Mass Giorgini as recording and mixing engineers. Ben Weasel, who had produced both 1993's Love Songs for the Retarded and the Queers' cover of Rocket to Russia, served as record producer. As he had for Love Songs for the Retarded, Livermore flew out from Berkeley, California, to be present for the recording sessions. According to him, Weasel insisted on a no-frills punk rock sound for Beat Off, which differed from his and King's vision for the album:

The mood was distinctly different from the genial, drunken chaos that had accompanied the making of Love Songs for the Retarded. During the Love Songs sessions, Ben had been efficient, good-natured, and accommodating. In Chicago I found him curt, brusque, and, at times, just plain rude. Above all I was baffled by his refusal to let the Queers record the guitar and vocal overdubs that were fundamental to their Beach Boys-meet-the-Ramones style. He kept insisting that we needed to go for a more basic punk sound. I'd been talking with Joe about this record for months. A more basic punk sound was not at all what he'd had in mind. But Ben was a hard guy to say no to, especially in light of all he'd done to help the Queers. "It's your record, not his," I said to Joe. "I can talk to him for you." Joe sighed, and told me there was no point in bringing it up, that it would just end in a big argument.

Dissatisfied with Weasel's stylistic approach, King and Livermore made plans for another recording session with Giorgini at his Sonic Iguana Studios in Lafayette, Indiana, later that summer to work on songs with fuller arrangements, resulting in the Surf Goddess EP. Beat Off would be the last Queers album produced by Weasel. One of its songs, "Ben Weasel", was a tribute to him, with the lyrics "Ben Weasel – 'He's an asshole' / Ben Weasel – 'He's a jerk' / Ben Weasel – You just hate him 'cuz he don't hafta work". "Mirage" is a cover version of the 1967 song by Tommy James and the Shondells, and was later re-recorded for Surf Goddess. Some of the other songs dated back several years: "Live This Life", "Half Shitfaced", and "Too Many Twinkies" had been recorded in May 1991 for a demo tape the Queers had made for Weasel, in hopes of convincing him to work with them (the contents of this demo were later released on the 1999 compilation Later Days and Better Lays).

== Removal of Vapid's tracks ==
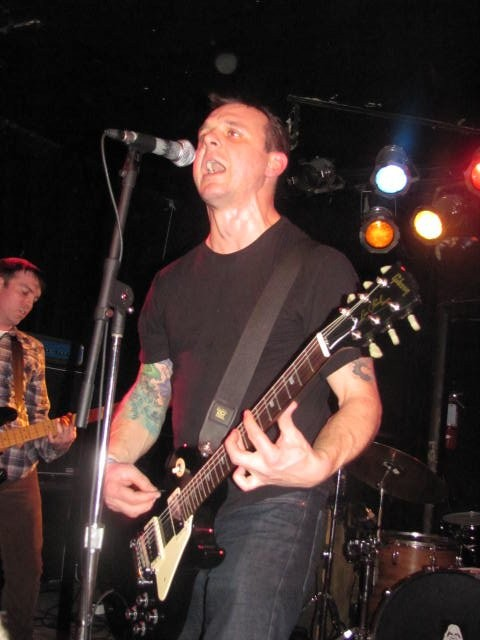
Guitar and vocal tracks recorded by Dan Vapid (pictured in 2011) were removed from the final mix by Ben Weasel.

Although he had recorded guitar and backing vocals for Beat Off in the studio, was credited in the liner notes, and was included in photographs on the album sleeve as a member of the band, Dan Vapid was surprised to learn, after the album's release, that Weasel had removed his tracks from the final mix. He did not learn this until royalty payments were issued for the album's sales and he, unlike the other members, did not receive any:

Of course I thought this was a mistake at first, so I called Lookout Records to find out what was going on. They had no idea why I wasn't paid, so I called Ben Weasel to see what the problem was. And that was when I got the truth. Ben Weasel, who produced the record, had taken all of my tracks off of the recording. I guess he had told Joe he needed to let me know that I was not on the record and would not be paid for my work. however, Joe never let me know that I was taken off the record—neither did Larry Livermore, who was at the recording session and was aware of the situation. Joe, B-Face, Dan Panic, and Larry all later called me to apologize for the situation. They all seemed to point an accusatory finger at Ben, saying that they wanted my tracks on the record, but Ben adamantly insisted that my tracks should not be used and that I should not be paid.

In his 2015 memoir How to Ru(i)n a Record Label: The Story of Lookout Records, Livermore wrote that during this time "erratic and inexplicable behavior was becoming the norm with Ben", who had developed agoraphobia and refused to tour, was obsessing over money, and was determined to kick Panic out of Screeching Weasel. Though he did not go through with firing Panic, Weasel instead forced Vapid out of the band, replacing him with Green Day's Mike Dirnt for Screeching Weasel's subsequent album How to Make Enemies and Irritate People, recorded two months after the Beat Off sessions. Vapid later stated that when he returned from touring with the Queers, Weasel claimed that he had developed a drinking problem and gave him an ultimatum: stop drinking or be replaced in Screeching Weasel; Vapid chose to quit, and said that when Dirnt was brought in to replace him "that is when I knew what the 'drinking problem' malarkey was all about." "The official story was that Vapid had voluntarily left," said Livermore, "but when I saw Dan a couple days later, he could barely hold back his tears." He also noted that although Weasel complained about Panic and Vapid, he had formed a new band with both of them, the Riverdales, shortly after breaking up Screeching Weasel following the completion of How to Make Enemies and Irritate People: "Despite Ben's claims that they were 'impossible' to work with, he seemed to have no problems recording Beat Off with them. There could have been other things going on behind the scenes that I was unaware of, but kicking Vapid out of Screeching Weasel looked to me like a pointless power play."

== Artwork ==
The artwork for Beat Off was created by Lookout!'s Patrick Hynes and Chris Appelgren, with Hynes providing the design of the band's name and album title while Appelgren provided the rest of the artwork and did the layout. The album marked the debut of the "Queers cat", a mascot Appelgren created for the band based on old Felix the Cat images he had "borrowed" for the artwork of Love Songs for the Retarded. The cover photograph, credited to "Julie #9", showed a live Queers audience giving the camera the finger.

== Reception ==
Reviewing Beat Off for AllMusic, Kembrew McLeod commented that it "takes a step back, or so it seems, from the melodic growth shown between Grow Up and Love Songs for the Retarded. Actually, the ratio between melodicism versus dissonant, high-speed punk is probably the same as on Love Songs, but Queers fans have come to expect more." Livermore later wrote that he felt the album suffered from rushed and lackluster production, while King called it and the Queer's following studio album, 1995's Move Back Home, "mediocre", saying they did not measure up to albums put out during the same period by the band's peers, specifically Screeching Weasel's My Brain Hurts (1991), Green Day's Dookie (1994), and the Mr. T Experience's Love Is Dead (1996).

== Reissue ==
In 2006 the Queers followed several other former Lookout! artists in rescinding their master tapes and licensing rights from the label, invoking a clause in their contract citing delinquent royalty payments. They signed to Asian Man Records, who reissued all of the band's Lookout! albums in 2007, each having been remixed and remastered by Mass Giorgini at his Sonic Iguana Studios in Lafayette, Indiana. For its reissue, Beat Off was given new artwork including a different cover photograph (also taken by Julie #9), and new liner notes written by Ben Weasel extolling the virtues of King's songwriting and authenticity. This release also added a cover version of the Angry Samoans' "My Old Man's a Fatso", an outtake from the Beat Off sessions originally released as the title track of an EP put out by independent record label Woundup Records.

== Track listing ==
Writing credits adapted from the album's liner notes.^{[I]}

No.	Title	Writer(s)	Length
1.	"Steak Bomb"	Joe Queer	0:48
2.	"Drop the Attitude Fucker"	Queer	1:40
3.	"You Make Me Wanna Puke"	Queer, Chris "B-Face" Barnard, Dan Vapid	2:07
4.	"Teenage Gluesniffer"	Queer, Ben Weasel	2:35
5.	"Ben Weasel"	Queer	2:16
6.	"Voodoo Doll"	Queer, JJ Rassler	3:01
7.	"Mirage" (originally performed by Tommy James and the Shondells)	Ritchie Cordell	2:56
8.	"Grounded"	Queer, B-Face, Vapid	1:45
9.	"Live This Life"	Queer	1:37
10.	"Half Shitfaced"	Queer, Barnard	1:30
11.	"Too Many Twinkies"	Queer, B-Face, Hugh O'Neill	1:13
12.	"All Screwed Up"	Queer	3:25
Total length:			24:53

Bonus track on 2007 reissue, from the EP My Old Man's a Fatso (1994)
No.	Title	Writer(s)	Length
13.	"My Old Man's a Fatso" (originally performed by the Angry Samoans)	"Metal Mike" Saunders	1:22
Total length:			25:15

== Personnel ==
Credits adapted from the album's liner notes. Although Dan Vapid is credited on the album with having performed guitar and backing vocals, producer Ben Weasel removed his tracks from the final mix.

The Queers

- Joe Queer (Joe King) – lead vocals, guitar
- B-Face (Chris Barnard) – bass guitar, backing vocals
- Dan Vapid (Dan Schafer) – guitar, backing vocals
- Dan Panic (Dan Sullivan) – drums

Production

- Ben Weasel – producer
- Mass Giorgini – audio engineer, mixing engineer; remixing and remastering of 2007 reissue
- Mark Schwartz – audio engineer, mixing engineer

Artwork

- Patrick Hynes – Beat Off logo
- Chris Appelgren – artwork, layout
- Julie #9 – cover photographs
- Skylar – layout of 2007 reissue

== Notes ==
I On the original Lookout! Records release of Beat Off, Joe King (aka Joe Queer) is credited as writer of all tracks with the exceptions of "Teenage Gluesniffer", co-written by Ben Weasel; "Half Shitfaced" and "All Screwed Up", co-written by Chris "B-Face" Barnard; and "Mirage", which is credited to "T. Hart". The 1996 compilation album A Day Late and a Dollar Short credits demo versions of "Half Shitfaced" and "Too Many Twinkies" to Queer and Barnard, while the 1999 compilation Later Days and Better Lays credits other demo versions of these tracks to Queer alone. The 2007 reissue of Beat Off on Asian Man Records credits the tracks as listed in the track listing above, but mistakenly credits "Half Shitfaced" solely to Barnard and "Mirage" to Tommy James (Tommy James and the Shondells albums credit Ritchie Cordell as the writer of "Mirage").
