= A Day Late and a Dollar Short (disambiguation) =

A Day Late and a Dollar Short is a 2002 novel by Terry McMillan.

A Day Late and a Dollar Short may also refer to:

- A Day Late and a Dollar Short (album), 1996, by The Queers
- "A Day Late and a Dollar Short", a song by Ian Gillan from Dreamcatcher, 1997
- "A Day Late, a Dollar Short", a song by Hanoi Rocks from Twelve Shots on the Rocks, 2002
