= Everything's OK =

Everything's OK may refer to:

- Everything's OK (EP), a 1998 EP by The Queers
- Everything's OK (album), a 2005 album by Al Green
