= Everything's O.K. =

EP by The Queers
- Released: May 19, 1998
- Recorded: February 12–14, 1998
- Studio: Big Sound Studios, Westbrook, Maine
- Genre: Punk rock
- Label: Hopeless (HR 631)
- Producer: Mass Giorgini

The Queers chronology
Don't Back Down (1996)	Everything's O.K. (1998)	Punk Rock Confidential (1998)

Everything's O.K. is an EP by the American punk rock band the Queers, released in May 1998 by Hopeless Records.

== Track listing ==
1. "Everything's O.K." (from the album Punk Rock Confidential)
2. "Queerbait"
3. "Get a Life and Live It Loser"
4. "I Enjoy Being a Boy"

== Personnel ==
- Joe Queer – guitar, vocals
- Geoff Useless – bass, vocals
- Rick Respectable – drums, vocals
