= Jon Cougar Concentration Camp =

American punk rock band

- Origin: San Diego, California, United States
- Genres: Punk rock
- Years active: 1994–1999, 2009–present
- Labels: Livid, BYO, Mutant Pop
- Members: Chris Fields; Dave Swain; Chip Fracture

Jon Cougar Concentration Camp is an American punk rock band from San Diego, California, United States.

== History ==
Jon Cougar Concentration Camp was formed in January 1994 in San Diego by Chris Fields, Clint Graham, Travis Spatter, and Travis Milligan. The band named themselves after a pun on musician John Cougar Mellencamp. They played their first show at The Casbah on January 31, 1994, and less than two months later self-released their first 7” EP. This would be the only recording with Clint and Travis, who both left the band. Bass guitarist Dave Swain was eventually added and the band continued as a trio.

Their eponymous debut album came in 1995 on Second Guess Records. Til Niagara Falls was released on punk label BYO Records in 1997. This would be followed up by two more albums in 1998, Melon an album of new JCCC material, and Too Tough to Die a track for track cover of the Ramones album of the same name.

During a break between tours and recording Dave and Chris joined The Queers and played on their album Punk Rock Confidential. Dwarves frontman Blag Dahlia (who had produced Melon) also invited Chris to join his band. Chris would join The Dwarves, and after being overwhelmed by being in three bands, left the Queers and ended Jon Cougar Concentration Camp. A final JCCC album Hot Shit was released in 1999.

After a ten-year hiatus the band reunited in 2009. They recorded another song for song cover album, this time a version of Screeching Weasel's My Brain Hurts titled My Hair Hurts. It was released on Livid Records as a vinyl only release in November 2009.

Jon Cougar Concentration Camp was included in the list of "100 Best Band Names of All Time" by Paste Magazine in December, 2009.

In 2015, the band released the four-track EP Armageddon Party on Rad Girlfriend Records, their first release of original music in 15 years.

== Discography ==
=== Studio albums ===
- Jon Cougar Concentration Camp (That's Il-Legal -- Go Get Them) (1995)
- 'Til Niagara Falls... (1997)
- Melon (1998)
- Too Tough to Die (1998)
- Hot Shit (1999)
- My Hair Hurts (2009)
- Armageddon Party (EP) (2015)

=== Compilation albums ===
- No More Room in Hell (2000)
