= Toothless George =

American punk rock musician

Toothless George (born Yurgi F. Šiugždinis; June 1, 1973) is a Lithuanian-American punk rock musician. He is best known for his work with The Halflings, Toothless George & His One-Man Band, and Percocettes. George is a former professional skateboarder and currently lives in Tokyo, Japan.

== History ==
=== Early life ===
Šiugždinis was born in Vilnius, Lithuania, and raised in West Chester, Pennsylvania. His father worked at a gas station, and his mother was a truck driver. He was turned onto punk rock in 1985 accidentally, while attending North Coventry Elementary. He said in Scratched Magazine, “Me becoming a punk rocker had nothing to do with the music. I listened to New Edition, and L.L. Cool J. No one would let me sit at their lunch table except the punk rock kids. That why I’m a punk rocker. I got into the music later.”

=== Musical History ===
One of the first bands that Toothless George played in was the straight edge hard core band Bound By Blue with Matt Summers (Shark Attack) and Matt Smith (Shark Attack, Rain on the Parade). After Bound By Blue disbanded, he and Smith performed in the punk rock group Mao & The Chinese Revolution from their beginning in 1987 until they disbanded in 1993. They released one 7” on Creep Records. Soon thereafter, George founded the Halflings with Matt Drastic (Teen Idols, The Queers) and Donnie Switchblade. They ultimately broke up in 1996. They had released four 7” vinyl records, and were featured on twelve various artist compilations. Shortly thereafter, George put the band back together one last time with Steve Ferrell (Kid Dynamite) and Dave Sausage (The Boils) but never played out with that line up.

In 2001, George joined The Bedrockers, with his older brother Ed Rocker. While with The Bedrockers, George started performing as a one-man band on the side- playing guitar, bass drum, snare drum, two tambourines, harmonica, and singing simultaneously. When The Bedrockers broke up in 2003, the one-man band became his full-time band. He has released two e.p.’s, one full album, and has been featured on three compilations. Toothless George, and girlfriend, Cole Della-Zucca started The Percocettes together in 2006. They released two c.d.’s and performed hundreds of shows in The United States, Europe, and Japan.

In 2007, Toothless George was awarded Barrymore Award for a theatrical musical he wrote with Brat Productions.

== Discography ==
=== Mao & The Chinese Revolution ===
1. "Live at Unisound" cassette (Self Released) 1990
2. "Live at Sabatino's" cassette (Self Released) 1991
3. "America's Finest" 7-inch(Creep Records) 1993

=== The Halflings ===
1. "Memory Lapse" 7-inch (Creep Records) 1994
2. v/a - "120 Days..." VHS/BETA (Groove Productions) 1994
3. The Diplomats & The Halflings 2/3 song split 7-inch (Pink Rock/Alien Records) 1995
4. v/a - "Matthau Records Compilation" (Matthau Records) 1995
5. "Frabbajabba!" 7-inch (Creep Records) 1995
6. v/a - "Dad, I Can't Breathe" L.P. (Creep Records) 1995
7. "A Kiss For Christmas" 7-inch single (Switchblade Records) 1995
8. v/a - "Suburban Voice Sampler" Suburban Voice Magazine) 1997
9. v/a - "So Punk, Barely Visible To The Naked Eye" CD (Ripped Records) 1996
10. v/a - "Got A Minute?" CD (Microcosm Records) 1997
11. v/a - "Punk Will Eat Itself" cassette (PWEI Zine) 1995
12. v/a - "Rookies In Underwear" cassette (Insane Records) 1995
13. v/a - I'm A Luck Dragon" CD (Atrayu Records) 19??
14. v/a - "Exploitational Sampler" CD (Creep Records) 1996
15. v/a - "Stop Homophobia" Vol. II 7-inch (Turkey Bastor Records) 1995
16. v/a - "What Are You Looking At!" CD (Switchblade Records) 1996
17. "I Don't Wanna Go To School" CD/10" (Unreleased) 1997
18. "Runaround Sue" 7-inch (Double A Records) 1999
19. v/a- "Punk Station 2" cassette (WFMU 91.1FM) 1996

=== The Bedrockers ===
1. "Suck Knob On Zero" 5 song CD (Self Released) 2002
2. "Code Blue" Promo CD (Self Released) 2002
3. v/a - "Punk Vs. Emo" Double CD (Fast Music/Mindset Records) 2003
4. v/a - "Say Ten Sampler" CD (Say-Ten Records) 2003
5. v/a - "Play It Loud" Vol. II (Freddie & Cary's Label) 2003
6. "When We Meet Again" CD-R (Self Released) 2003
7. v/a - "Everlasting Sampler" CD (Wonka Vision Records) 2004
8. v/a - "Voices In The Wilderness" CD (DIY & Proud Records) 2005

=== Toothless George & His One-Man Band ===
1. "Live In NYC!" Limited Edition 5 song CD-R (Strip Tees Record Division) 2004
2. "Lone Wolf" 4 song 7-inch (Jett Black Records) 2004
3. "Live In NYC!" 5 song CD (Strip Tees Record Division) 2004
4. v/a - "Get Outta Philly!" CD (Tick Tick Tick Records) 2005
5. "Lone Wolf" 6 song CD (Schuylkill Records) 2005
6. v/a - "Philly Roller Girls Presents: Hellybilly Horrors vs. Urban Legends" DVD 2006
7. "Promo" 2 song CD (Strip Tees Record Division) 2006
8. "Lone Wolf" 9 song LP (Criminal Records) 2006
9. v/a - "Killed By A One-Man Band" 7-inch (Squoodge Records & Drunk'nRoll Schallplatten) 2006
10. v/a - "Attack Of The One-Man Bands!" Double CD (Rock N Roll Pergatory Records) 2007
11. "The Sound Of Titties" 25 song CD (Strip Tees Record Division)2007
12. v/a - "God Save The Queers" CD (Asian Man Records) 2008
13. "& The Heavy Metal Hookers" (Strip Tees Record Division) 2009
14. v/a - "Flogging Margarette Original Soundtrack" DVD (Warner Brothers) 2008

=== Toothless George & His Ten-Man Band ===
1. "Long In The Tooth! - Tenth Anniversary Show Live" LP (Self Released) 2013

=== Percocettes ===
1. "Seventeen" b/w "Inflatable Girl" 2 song CD (Self Released) 2007
2. "Say It To My Fist!" 4 song CD (Self Released) 2009

=== Cylon 78 ===
1. Self Titled digital E.P.

=== Poison Hearts (A.C.) ===
1. "Hostile City" digital single (Self Released) 2019
2. "Has-Beens & Wannabes" digital single (Self Released) 2020

== Bibliography ==
1. "Angel of the Aegean" Memoirs (Strip Tees Books) 2007
2. "One Night Only" (Strip Tees Books) 2011
3. "Band Together" (Strip Tees Books) 2012
4. "Fuck America: Travel Guide for Fuckin' Enthusiasts" Coloring Book (Strip Tees Books) 2016
5. "A Celebration of Pride" Coloring Book (Strip Tees Books) 2017
6. "Fuck Trump" Coloring Book (Strip Tees Books) 2018

== Links ==
- Official website
