= The Hotlines =

English pop punk band

- Origin: Brighton, England
- Genres: Pop punk
- Years active: 2007–2012
- Labels: Monster Zero Records; Devil's Jukebox Records
- Members: Ben - main vocals & lead guitar Matt - rhythm guitar & backing vocals Leon - lead guitar Kyle - bass & backing vocals Nick - keys, percussion & backing vocals Will - drums
- Past members: Max - drums Rory - bass
- Website: Official website

The Hotlines were an English pop punk band, who formed in Brighton in 2007. They released a split 7-inch record with American pop punk band the Queers in 2008, followed by a self-titled debut album in 2009. Both releases were on Devil's Jukebox records. Their follow-up record, The Return Of... The Hotlines was released on 10-inch vinyl on Monster Zero Records in 2011. During this time they have toured all over Europe. Their sound has often been compared to early Green Day, with nods to the Beach Boys and the Ramones.

== Discography ==
=== Studio albums ===
- The Hotlines (2009) Devil's Jukebox Records
- Can't Stop Partying (2012) Devil's Jukebox Records

=== EPs ===
- self titled (CDEP) 2007, Bubblegum Attack Records
- untitled (split 7-inch with Radio Days) 2007, Nothing To Prove Records
- untitled (split 7-inch with The Queers) 2008, Devil's Jukebox Records
- The Return Of... The Hotlines (2011) Monster Zero Records

=== Compilations ===
- When The Kids Go Go Go Crazy - A Tribute To The Groovie Ghoulies, 2008, Kamikaze Records
- Where The Fun Never Sets Volume 2, 2008, Cabana 1 Records
