= Olé Maestro =

Live album by The Queers
- Released: 2013
- Recorded: 2009
- Venue: Gruta 77, Madrid, Spain
- Genre: Punk rock
- Label: MediaDavid Produccions

Olé Maestro is a live album by the band The Queers. It was recorded live, 100% overdub free, at Gruta77 venue in Madrid, Spain, on November 14, 2009. And it was released on CD in May 2013 by MediaDavid Produccions. It contains 38 tracks and a comic inside the booklet.

== Band ==
- Joe Queer – Vocals & Guitar
- Dangerous Dave – Bass guitar & Backing vocals
- Lurch Nobody – Drums

== Credits ==
- Recorded by Astray
- Mixed by David Rosell at Can Pardaler Studios, Barcelona
- Mastered at Monoposto Studios in Düsseldorf, Germany
- Foh engineering by Carlos Zaragoza

== Artwork ==
Full artwork, comic and photos by Joel Abad from Grafficants Studio, Barcelona.

== Comments ==
- "Always loved to play Madrid and Gruta77 is the right place, so why not to record a live album there? Sold out shows since the early days, now almost 20 years after, is the best gift we could make to our spanish fans, because in Madrid gigs people from all country are coming all the way to the capital to have a funny punk rock night." (Joe Queer)

== Track listing ==
1. "Tamara Is a Punk"
2. "No Tit"
3. "You're Tripping"
4. "Wimpy Drives Through Harlem"
5. "Steak Bomb"
6. "Drop the Attitude Fucker"
7. "I Can't Stop Farting"
8. "Night of the Vivid Queers"
9. "Tulu Is a Wimp"
10. "I Want It Now"
11. "Monster Zero"
12. "I Spent the Rent"
13. "Nothing to Do"
14. "Hi Mom, It's Me!"
15. "Granola-Head"
16. "I Hate Everything"
17. "Kicked Out of the Webelos"
18. "S.L.U.G."
19. "Ursula Finally Has Tits"
20. "Don't Back Down"
21. "Punk Rock Girls"
22. "Girl About Town"
23. "Born to Do Dishes"
24. "Like a Parasite"
25. "Debra Jean"
26. "The Kids Are Alright"
27. "Love Love Love"
28. "Another Girl"
29. "Cindy's On Methadone"
30. "Fuck the World"
31. "This Place Sucks"
32. "Sheena Is a Punk Rocker"
33. "See You Later Fuckface"
34. "I Wanna Be Happy"
35. "Noodlebrain"
36. "Teenage Bonehead"
37. "Feeling Groovy"
38. "Wipe Out"
