= Summer Hits No. 1 =

Studio album by The Queers
- Released: October 19, 2004
- Recorded: Q Division - Somerville, MA
- Genre: Pop punk, punk rock
- Label: Suburban Home; SH-8041

The Queers chronology
Pleasant Screams (2002)	Summer Hits No. 1 (2004)	Weekend at Bernie's (2006)

Summer Hits No. 1 is an album by pop punk band The Queers. It features the then-current lineup doing 14 new recordings of old songs along with one new song. The album features cover art by Takayuki Hashimoto.

== Track listing ==
1. "This Place Sucks"
2. "Monster Zero"
3. "You're Tripping"
4. "Kicked Out of the Weblos"
5. "Love Love Love"
6. "Another Girl"
7. "My Old Man's a Fatso"
8. "I Wanna Be Happy"
9. "Ursula Finally Has Tits"
10. "Like a Parasite"
11. "Psycho Over You"
12. "Punk Rock Girls"
13. "Aishiteruyo Kanojo"
14. "The Kids Are Alright"
15. "Fuck This World"

== Personnel ==
- Joe Queer - Vocals, Guitar
- Phillip Hill - Bass, Vocals
- Dusty Watson - Drums, Vocals
