= A Day Late and a Dollar Short (album) =

- The original album cover, showing Wimpy Rutherford (right) performing with the Queers in 1994 (Joe Queer at left)

Compilation album by The Queers
- Released: January 23, 1996
- Recorded: 1982–1994
- Studios: Fishtracks and Reelization (Portsmouth, New Hampshire)
- Genre: Punk rock
- Length: 65:01
- Label: Lookout! (LK 130)
- Producers: Bruce Pingree, Norm Thibeault, Hugh O'Neill, Jim Tierney

The Queers chronology
Move Back Home (1995)	A Day Late and a Dollar Short (1996)	Bubblegum Dreams (1996)

Alternative cover
- Cover of the 2007 reissue, showing the Queers performing at a pool party in 1982 (Joe Queer on guitar, drummer Tulu seated)

A Day Late and a Dollar Short is a compilation album by the American punk rock band the Queers, released in January 1996 by Lookout! Records. It collects material recorded between 1982 and 1994, most of it with original member Wimpy Rutherford. It includes the band's first two EPs, 1982's Love Me and 1984's Kicked Out of the Webelos, several demo tracks recorded in 1991, 16 tracks recorded during a January 1993 reunion with Rutherford, and a complete set of early songs recorded live on radio station WFMU in 1994 with Rutherford on lead vocals.

After the Queers rescinded their master recordings from Lookout! in 2006, A Day Late and a Dollar Short was reissued by Asian Man Records the following year, having been remastered by the band's longtime studio collaborator Mass Giorgini.

== Material ==
=== Love Me ===
The album's first 13 tracks comprise the Queers' first two EPs, Love Me (1982) and Kicked Out of the Webelos (1984). The band had formed in 1982 in Portsmouth, New Hampshire, with the lineup of Joseph King on guitar and lead vocals, Scott Gildersleeve on bass guitar and backing vocals, and Jack Hayes on drums; they took the respective pseudonyms Joe Queer, Tulu, and Wimpy Rutherford. This lineup never performed live, but recorded their first songs at local studio Fishtracks with recording engineer Bruce Pingree, who served as de facto producer. These included "We'd Have a Riot Doing Heroin"; "Terminal Rut", written about Rutherford; and "Fagtown", which was about their hometown. For "I Want Cunt", Queer played bass while Tulu played guitar and sang lead vocals. On "Trash This Place", the band members recorded voices for the background and then sped up the tape to mimic the Ramones song "We're a Happy Family".

The band's friend Brian Barrett was hanging out in the studio wearing a T-shirt that read "Beat me, bite me, whip me, fuck me, cum all over my tits, tell me that you love me, then get the fuck out"; deciding that they needed one more song, they invited their older drinking buddy William H. "Pappy" McClaren into the recording booth, plied him with alcohol, and asked him to read the phrase on Barrett's shirt repeatedly while they played instrumental parts they had made up on the spot. McClaren began to improvise, saying lines such as "Hey big boy, if you can't run with the big dogs, you better stay on the porch." The band kept the first take, titled it "Love Me", and made it the B-side and title track of their first EP. Only 200 copies were pressed; in a do it yourself fashion, the band made up their own record label imprint, Doheny Records, and issued it in a plain white sleeve without artwork or an insert, hand-writing the credits and other comments on the sleeves.

=== Kicked Out of the Webelos ===
Tulu moved to New York City after Love Me, but Queer and Rutherford continued to write new songs, bringing in new bassist Keith Hages, formerly of Los Angeles punk band the Berlin Brats. Coming up with 7 new songs in a single afternoon, they called Tulu and convinced him to return to Portsmouth to record another EP with the Queers. They drove to New York to pick him up, occasioning them to write the song "Wimpy Drives Through Harlem". Rutherford switched from drums to being the band's lead vocalist, singing in an over-the-top faux British accent. Queer stayed on guitar and sang backing vocals, while Tulu switched to drums: "I ended up doing what Micky Dolenz and Tommy Ramone had done (though obviously on a much smaller scale)," he recalled in 2007, "which was willing myself to play drums because I had a certain sound in mind which I felt was crucial for the type of songs we were doing." This lineup recorded the Kicked Out of the Webelos EP at Reelization Studios with recording engineer and local radio disc jockey Norm Thibeault. Like Love Me, it was issued under the Doheny Records imprint in a white paper sleeve without cover art. This lineup of the Queers only lasted a few months, and played only five shows before breaking up.

=== Reunion with Rutherford ===
The next 16 tracks on A Day Late and a Dollar Short are from a January 1993 reunion with Rutherford. Joe Queer had revived the Queers in the mid-1980s, with a number of members coming and going from the lineup over the next several years and sporadic recording sessions resulting in the band's first album, 1990's Grow Up. By this time the lineup had solidified with Queer, drummer Hugh O'Neill, and bassist Chris "B-Face" Barnard, who recorded the band's second album, Love Songs for the Retarded, in November 1992. Wimpy Rutherford had left Portsmouth, but returned for the Christmas holidays that December. While in town, he rejoined the Queers for some live performances and to record some of the songs they had written in the early 1980s but had not recorded, including "Wimpy Drives Through Harlem", "I Like Young Girls", "Nobody Likes Me", "I'm Nowhere at All", "Nothing to Do", and a cover version of Richard Harris's 1968 hit "MacArthur Park". Queer had found a pair of old rehearsal tapes which included the band's complete set list from 1983; they had been teaching Hages the songs at the time and were calling out the chord changes, which made it easy for the band to re-learn the parts to the old songs by listening to the tapes.

The tracks were recorded in a single session at a small 8-track studio in Portsmouth, with Rutherford on lead vocals, Queer on rhythm guitar and backing vocals, B-Face on bass, O'Neill on drums and serving as producer, and Queer's roommate Harlan playing lead guitar. 13 of these tracks were issued on three EPs: Too Dumb to Quit! on Doheny Records (1993), Look Ma No Flannel! on Clearview Records (1994), and My Old Man's a Fatso on Woundup Records (1995). Following this material on A Day Late and a Dollar Short are three previously unreleased outtakes from the session: alternate takes of "Wimpy Drives Through Harlem" and "Nothing to Do", and a recording of the Grow Up song "Gay Boy". This lineup of the Queers performed a 16-song set on radio station WFMU in New Jersey on April 11, 1994, which is included as the final track on A Day Late and a Dollar Short. Rutherford also performed with the band at a 1994 show in El Paso, Texas; a photograph taken by Heidi Smith of this performance was used for the album cover.

=== 1991 demos ===
The remaining four tracks on the album are versions of "Nobody Likes Me", "Too Many Twinkies", "Half Shitfaced", and "I Live This Life" from a demo tape that Queer, B-Face, and O'Neill had recorded in May 1991 with producer Jim Tierney to give Ben Weasel a sample of their new material, in the hopes of getting to perform with his band Screeching Weasel and convincing him to produce Love Songs for the Retarded. The entire 14-song demo tape was later released on the 1999 compilation album Later Days and Better Lays.

== Reception ==
Reviewing A Day Late and a Dollar Short for AllMusic, critic Kembrew McLeod rated it 4 stars out of 5 and wrote that it was "good for completists, but maddening to listen to because the recording and songwriting quality veers all over the place."

== Reissue ==
In 2006 the Queers followed several other former Lookout! artists in rescinding their master tapes and licensing rights from the label, invoking a clause in their contract citing delinquent royalty payments. They signed to Asian Man Records, who reissued all of the band's Lookout! albums in 2007. For its reissue, A Day Late and a Dollar Short was remastered by recording engineer Mass Giorgini, who had worked with the Queers in a studio capacity since 1992. The album was given a new cover and artwork, and new liner notes written by Queer, Rutherford, and Tulu reflecting on the band's early years.

== Track listing ==
Writing credits adapted from the album's liner notes.

No.	Title	Writer(s)	Length
1.	"We'd Have a Riot Doing Heroin" (from Love Me, 1982)	Scott "Tulu" Gildersleeve	1:02
2.	"Terminal Rut" (from Love Me, 1982)	Tulu, "Joe Queer" King, Jack "Wimpy Rutherford" Hayes	0:34
3.	"Fagtown" (from Love Me, 1982)	Tulu	0:30
4.	"I Want Cunt" (from Love Me, 1982)	Tulu	0:23
5.	"Trash This Place" (from Love Me, 1982)	Queer	1:38
6.	"Love Me" (from Love Me, 1982)	Tulu, William H. "Pappy" McClaren	3:57
7.	"Kicked Out of the Webelos" (from Kicked Out of the Webelos, 1984)	Queer, Rutherford	1:24
8.	"Tulu Is a Wimp" (from Kicked Out of the Webelos, 1984)	Queer, Rutherford	1:09
9.	"At the Mall" (from Kicked Out of the Webelos, 1984)	Queer, Rutherford	1:03
10.	"I Spent the Rent" (from Kicked Out of the Webelos, 1984)	Queer, Rutherford	0:24
11.	"I Don't Wanna Work" (from Kicked Out of the Webelos, 1984)	Queer, Rutherford	1:56
12.	"I'm Useless" (from Kicked Out of the Webelos, 1984)	Queer, Rutherford	1:11
13.	"This Place Sucks" (from Kicked Out of the Webelos, 1984)	Queer, Rutherford	0:52
14.	"Wimpy Drives Through Harlem" (from Look Ma No Flannel!, 1994)	Queer, Rutherford	1:23
15.	"I Like Young Girls" (from Look Ma No Flannel!, 1994)	Queer, Rutherford	1:44
16.	"Nuni in New York" (from Look Ma No Flannel!, 1994)	Tulu	0:53
17.	"Nobody Likes Me" (from Look Ma No Flannel!, 1994)	Queer, Rutherford	2:00
18.	"Nothing to Do" (from Too Dumb to Quit!, 1993)	Tulu	0:53
19.	"I'm Nowhere at All" (from Too Dumb to Quit!, 1993)	Queer, Rutherford	1:05
20.	"MacArthur Park" (originally performed by Richard Harris; from My Old Man's a Fatso, 1994)	Jimmy Webb	1:37
21.	"Too Much Flesh for Tulu" (from Look Ma No Flannel!, 1994)	Queer, Rutherford	0:28
22.	"Fuck You" (from Too Dumb to Quit!, 1993)	Chris "B-Face" Barnard	1:01
23.	"I Didn't Want None" (from Look Ma No Flannel!, 1994)	Queer	1:40
24.	"Meat Wagon" (from My Old Man's a Fatso, 1994)	Queer, Rutherford	0:28
25.	"Didn't Puke" (from Too Dumb to Quit!, 1993)	Tulu	1:05
26.	"Bonehead" (from Too Dumb to Quit!, 1993)	Queer, Rutherford	2:24
27.	"Wimpy Drives Through Harlem" (alternate take)	Queer, Rutherford	1:54
28.	"Nothing to Do" (alternate take)	Tulu	0:50
29.	"Gay Boy"	Queer, Rutherford	2:09
30.	"Nobody Likes Me" (demo version, 1991)	Queer, Rutherford	2:10
31.	"Too Many Twinkies" (demo version, 1991)	Queer, B-Face	1:59
32.	"Half Shitfaced" (demo version, 1991)	Queer, B-Face	2:06
33.	"I Live This Life" (demo version, 1991)	Queer	1:54
34.	"Live Broadcast WFMU 4/11/94" ("We'd Have a Riot Doing Heroin" / "Terminal Rut" / "Fagtown" / "I Want Cunt" / "Tulu Is a Wimp" / "At the Mall" / "I Spent the Rent" / "I Don't Wanna Work" / "I'm Useless" / "This Place Sucks" / "Kicked Out of the Webelos" / "Nobody Likes Me" / "MacArthur Park" / "I'm Nowhere at All" / "Nothing to Do" / "I Like Young Girls")		19:15
Total length:			65:01

== Personnel ==
Credits adapted from the album's liner notes.

=== The Queers ===
- Joe Queer (Joe King) – guitar (all tracks except track 4), bass guitar (track 4), lead vocals (tracks 1–3, 5, and 30–33), backing vocals (tracks 4, 7–29, and 34)
- Tulu (Scott Gildersleeve) – bass guitar (tracks 1–3, 5, and 6), guitar (track 4), drums (tracks 7–13), backing vocals (tracks 1–3 and 5), lead vocals (track 4)
- Wimpy Rutherford (Jack Hayes) – drums (tracks 1–6), lead vocals (tracks 7–29 and 34)
- Keith Hages – bass guitar (tracks 7–13)
- B-Face (Chris Barnard) – bass guitar and backing vocals (tracks 14–34)
- Hugh O'Neill – drums (tracks 14–34), producer (tracks 14–29)

=== Additional performers ===
- Pappy (William H. McClaren) – lead vocal on track 6
- Harlan Miller – lead guitar (tracks 14–29 and 34)

=== Production ===
- Bruce Pingree – producer and audio engineer (tracks 1–6)
- Norm Thibeau – producer and audio engineer (tracks 7–13)
- Jim Tierney – producer (tracks 30–33)
- Mass Giorgini – remastering of 2007 reissue

=== Artwork ===
- Heidi Smith – cover photograph
- Skylar – layout of 2007 reissue
