= Dusty Watson =

American drummer

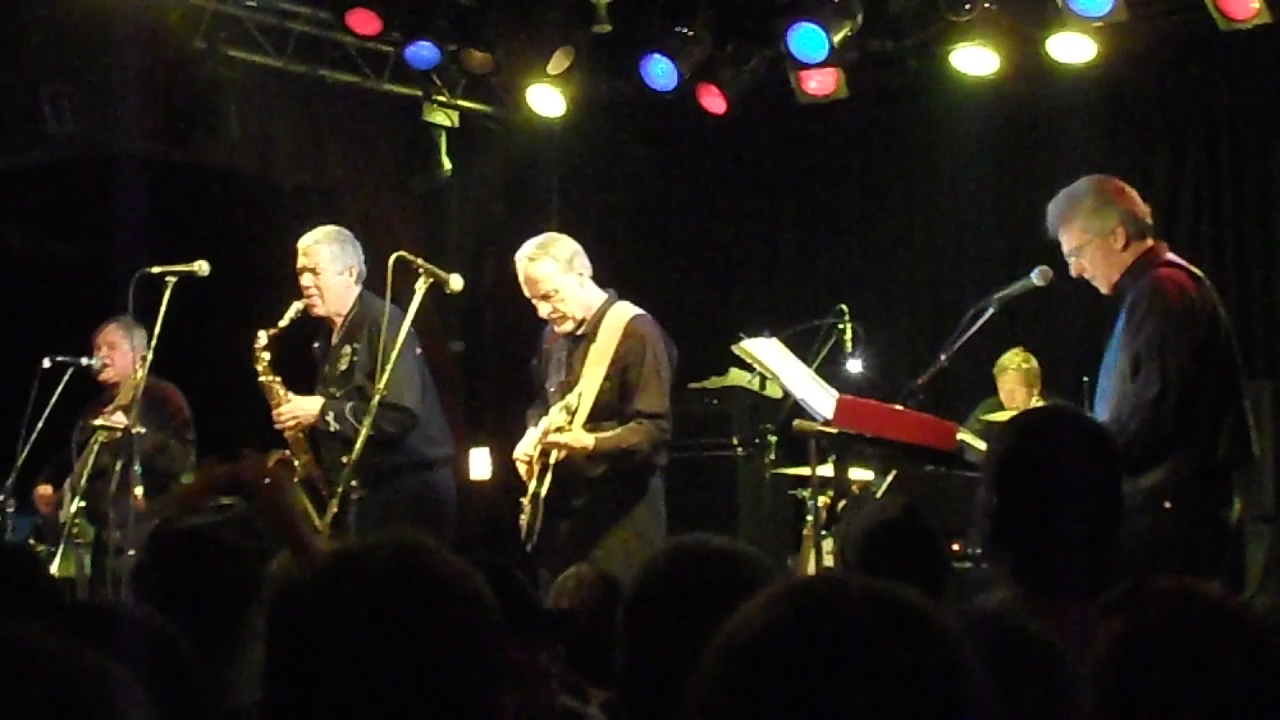
Dusty Watson (second from right, in the back row) performing as part of The Sonics in 2014

Dustin "Dusty" Watson is an American drummer who has played with various bands and solo artists.

== Biography ==
Earning a scholarship to Stan Kenton Band Clinics and joining the Musicians Union at age 17, he formed local California punk band The Press and by the end of the 1970s he was also an original member of Jon and the Nightriders and The Stepmothers. After leaving The Runaways, Lita Ford asked Watson to join her original line up. He recorded her debut album, Out for Blood, and toured with her from 1980 through 1984. After that he joined the band Legs Diamond, whom he would play with until 1993. During this period, Watson did side work in a number of notable bands, including Concrete Blonde, Channel 3 and talk show host Wally George.

After leaving Legs Diamond, he played drums on hip hop group Boo-Yaa T.R.I.B.E.'s albums Metally Disturbed and Angry Samoans and toured Europe. He went on to join Sugartooth, but the band quickly broke up after they were dropped by Geffen Records. Shortly after this he started the instrumental surf band Slacktone with co-founder Dave Wronski and started touring with Agent Orange (whom he would continue to work with through 2009). In 1997, he joined Dick Dale's backing band The Del-Tones, recording and touring with them through 2006.

Watson has recorded with Canadian born rocker Neil Merryweather, with whom he played in the Lita Ford band. He later joined The Queers to play on their albums Acid Beaters and Summer Hits No. 1.

He has drummed with the Supersuckers and Rhino Bucket. He also joined the psychedelic punk rock/thrash metal, BLOODHOOK, recording their debut full-length album at the legendary Van Nuys, California recording studio, Sound City.

Watson has also played with Becky Barksdale, Davie Allan and the Arrows, Slacktone, the Surfaris, The Balboas, The Sonics, and The Bellrays, and Nashville Pussy
