= Live in West Hollywood =

Live album by The Queers
- Released: October 2, 2001
- Recorded: The Troubadour - West Hollywood, CA in 2000
- Genre: Pop punk, punk rock
- Label: Hopeless; HR-658
- Producer: Donnel Cameron, Ramón Bretón

The Queers chronology
Beyond the Valley... (2000)	Live in West Hollywood (2001)	Pleasant Screams (2002)

Professional ratings
Review scores
Source	Rating
AllMusic	2.5/5 stars
Punknews.org	5/5 stars

Live in West Hollywood is a live album recorded at the Troubadour by pop punk band The Queers.

== Track listing ==
1. "We'd Have a Riot Doing Heroin" - 1:56
2. "This Place Sucks" - 0:40
3. "Tulu Is a Wimp" - 0:58
4. "I Want Cunt" - 0:21
5. "Monster Zero" - 2:00
6. "You're Tripping" - 1:37
7. "I Live This Life" - 1:43
8. "Tamara's a Punk" - 1:40
9. "Mirage" (Tommy James and the Shondells cover) - 2:45
10. "No Tit" - 1:26
11. "Blabbermouth" - 1:03
12. "I Can't Stand You" - 1:13
13. "Hi Mom, It's Me" - 0:45
14. "Granola Head" - 1:56
15. "Noodlebrain" - 2:44
16. "My Old Man's a Fatso" (Angry Samoans cover) - 1:17
17. "Fuck You" - 0:54
18. "I'm Not a Mongo Anymore" - 1:18
19. "I Will Be With You" (Mr. T Experience cover) - 1:45
20. "Kill That Girl" (The Ramones cover) - 2:10
21. "Kicked Out of the Weboloes" - 0:57
22. "I Hate Everything" - 1:14
23. "Teenage Bonehead" - 2:06
24. "Love Love Love" - 2:30
25. "Another Girl" - 1:40
26. "I Only Drink Bud" - 1:55
27. "Punk Rock Girls" - 2:52
28. "Ursula Finally Has Tits" - 2:25
29. "I Like Young Girls" - 1:39
30. "Nothing to Do" - 1:07
31. "Fuck the World" - 3:37
