= Suck This =

Live album by The Queers
- Released: 1995
- Venues: The Jam Room, Columbia, South Carolina
- Genre: Punk rock
- Label: Clearview (CRVW 37)

The Queers chronology
2/24/95, Fireside Bowl – Chicago, IL (1995)	Suck This (1995)	Love Ain't Punk (1995)

Suck This is the second live album by the American punk rock band the Queers, released in 1995 by independent record label Clearview Records. It was recorded live in the studio at the Jam Room in Columbia, South Carolina and released as a single-sided picture disc, and reissued on compact disc in 1998. It was the band's only live album recorded during the period when Screeching Weasel members Dan Vapid and Dan Panic were also in the Queers.

== Reception ==
Reviewing the album for AllMusic, critic Mike DaRonco rated it 4 stars out of 5 and said that in comparison to the band's previous live album, Shout at the Queers (1994), "the production is a lot tighter, the lineup features Danny Panic and Danny Vapid from Screeching Weasel fame and the songs blast from one track to the next without a breather (excluding 'Beer Break', which only lasts for a few seconds anyway). This is the definitive Queers live album that does them justice." In an overview of the band written for Trouser Press, Ira Robbins said that both live albums "capture the breathless rush of a Queers set with enthusiastic abandon."

== Track listing ==
Writing credits adapted from the liner notes of the band's other albums.

No.	Title	Writer(s)	Length
1.	"Squid Omelet"	Joe Queer
2.	"We'd Have a Riot Doing Heroin"	Scott "Tulu" Gildersleeve
3.	"This Place Sucks"	Queer, Jack "Wimpy Rutherford" Hayes
4.	"Tulu Is a Wimp"	Queer, Rutherford
5.	"I Want Cunt" (listed as "I Want It Now")	Tulu
6.	"Monster Zero"	Queer
7.	"fuck up" (the band begins "Noodlebrain" but makes a mistake and starts over)
8.	"Noodlebrain"	Queer
9.	"Granola-Head"	Queer
10.	"Hi Mom, It's Me!"	Queer
11.	"Teenage Bonehead"	Queer
12.	"beer break" (the band announces a momentary pause to drink beer)
13.	"I Spent the Rent"	Queer, Rutherford
14.	"Nothing to Do"	Tulu
15.	"My Old Man's a Fatso" (originally performed by the Angry Samoans)	"Metal Mike" Saunders
16.	"Fuck You"	Chris "B-Face" Barnard
17.	"Fuck the World"	Queer, Ben Weasel
18.	"I Hate Everything"	Queer
19.	"Ursula Finally Has Tits"	Queer
20.	"You're Tripping"	Queer

== Personnel ==
Credits adapted from the album's liner notes.

- Joe Queer (Joe King) – lead vocals, guitar
- Dan Vapid (Dan Schafer) – guitar, backing vocals
- B-Face (Chris Barnard) – bass guitar, backing vocals, artwork
- Dan Panic (Dan Sullivan) – drums
