= Back to the Basement =

Back To The Basement

Studio album by The Queers
- Released: November 16, 2010
- Studio: Loud and Clear, Atlanta
- Genre: Pop punk
- Length: 22:11
- Label: Asian Man (AM 210)
- Producer: Joe Queer, Dangerous Dave

The Queers chronology
Munki Brain (2007)	Back To The Basement (2010)

Back To The Basement is the eleventh studio album by punk rock band The Queers, released in 2010.

== Release ==
On June 3, 2010, Back To The Basement was announced for release in four months' time.

== Track listing ==
All tracks are written by Joe Queer, except where noted

No.	Title	Length
1.	"Rollerdog"	2:02
2.	"Back To The Basement"	2:07
3.	"Titfuck"	1:01
4.	"Outta My Skull"	2:00
5.	"Pull Me Out Of It"	1:41
6.	"Psychedelic Mindfuck"	3:38
7.	"I Knew GG When He Was A Wimp"	0:50
8.	"I'm Pissed"	0:47
9.	"White Minority" (written by Greg Ginn, originally performed by Black Flag)	1:09
10.	"Don't Touch My Hat"	1:35
11.	"Fucked In The Head"	0:56
12.	"Everyday Girl"	3:23
13.	"Keep It Punk"	2:02

== Personnel ==
Credits adapted from the album's liner notes.

The Queers

- Joe Queer (Joe King) – lead vocals, guitar, producer
- Dangerous Dave (Dave Swain) – bass guitar, backing vocals, producer
- Hog Log – drums

Additional performers

- Platelunch Danny – guitar, backing vocals
- Thomas Habit – bass guitar, backing vocals

Production

- Shelby P. – audio engineer, mixing engineer
- Johnny Love – mastering

Artwork

- Paolo Proserpio – photographs
- Kyle McQueen – illustrations
- Leslie Hampton – layout and design
