= Munki Brain =

Studio album by the Queers
- Released: February 6, 2007
- Studios: Sonic Iguana, Lafayette, Indiana
- Genre: Pop punk
- Label: Asian Man (ASM 141)
- Producer: Mass Giorgini

The Queers chronology
Weekend at Bernie's (2006)	Munki Brain (2007)	Back to the Basement (2010)

Professional ratings
Review scores
Source	Rating
Allmusic	3.5/5 stars
Punknews.org	4/5 stars

Munki Brain is an album by pop-punk band the Queers.

== Release ==
On October 13, 2006, the band's upcoming album was titled Munki Brain. On December 29, 2006, "Houston We Have a Problem" was posted on Asian Man Records' Myspace account; it was followed two days later by "I Think She's Starting to Like Me". On January 14, 2007, the album's track listing and cover artwork was posted online. In January and February 2007, went on a tour of the US with support from the Heart Attacks, Teenage Rehab, the Riptides and the Mansfields. On January 23, Munki Brain was made available for streaming, before being released by Asian Man Records on February 6. Following this, they went on an East Coast tour in April 2007, a West Coast tour with the Methadones, the Manges, and Black Tie Bombers in May and June 2007, and then a European trek with Marky Ramone in July 2007. In May and June 2008, the band toured the US as part of the Asian Man Records Tour with various labelmates, which included an appearance at the Insubordination Fest. They appeared at the 2009 South by Southwest music conference.

== Track listing ==
Writing credits adapted from the album's liner notes.

No.	Title	Writer(s)	Length
1.	"Overdue"	Joe Queer, Lisa Marr	2:47
2.	"Houston We Have a Problem"	Queer	2:09
3.	"I Don't Get It"	Queer, Ben Weasel	2:15
4.	"Duke Kahanamoku"	Queer	3:16
5.	"I Think She's Starting to Like Me"	Queer	1:45
6.	"Girl About Town" (originally performed by Helen Love)	Helen Love	2:24
7.	"Whatever Happened to Philthy Phil?"	Queer	1:45
8.	"I Can't Stay Mad at You" (originally performed by Skeeter Davis)	Gerry Goffin, Carole King	2:15
9.	"Tangerine"	Weasel	2:13
10.	"Something in My Heart"	Queer, Marr	2:58
11.	"I'm a Fool" (originally performed by Ricky Nelson)	Joey Cooper, Red West	2:23
12.	"Monkey in a Suit"	Queer, Mass Giorgini, Phillip Hill	2:18
13.	"Brian Wilson"	Queer, Marr	2:32

== Personnel ==
Credits adapted from the album's liner notes.

The Queers

- Joe Queer (Joe King) – guitar, lead vocals
- Phillip Hill – bass guitar, backing vocals
- Lurch Nobody – drums (all tracks except "I Think She's Starting to Like Me" and "Brian Wilson")

Additional performers

- Lisa Marr – vocals
- Mike Nolte – guitar, keyboard, vocals, photographs
- Nathan Bice – drums on "Brian Wilson"
- Dan Lumley – drums on "I Think She's Starting to Like Me"
- Vanesa Toquero – keyboards on "Duke Kahanamoku" and “I Think She’s Starting to Like Me”
- Mass Giorgini – backing vocals and tenor saxophone on "Duke Kahanamoku" and backing vocals on “I Think She’s Starting to Like Me”
- Peter "Blackie" Black – lead guitar on "Whatever Happened to Philthy Phil?"
- Rick Miller – lead guitar on "Duke Kahanamoku"

Production

- Mass Giorgini – producer, audio engineer
- Jorge Orillac – assistant audio engineer

Artwork

- Tony Dovi – photographs, album design, layout
