= Punk Rock Confidential (album) =

Studio album by The Queers
- Released: October 6, 1998
- Genre: Punk rock, Pop punk
- Label: Hopeless; HR-636
- Producer: Mass Giorgini & Joe Queer

The Queers chronology
Don't Back Down (1996)	Punk Rock Confidential (1998)	Later Days And Better Lays (1999)

Professional ratings
Review scores
Source	Rating
Allmusic	link

Punk Rock Confidential is the sixth full-length album by pop punk band The Queers and their first album released on Hopeless Records.

== Background and recording ==
After the 1996 album Don't Back Down, The Queers went through changes, including founding member Joe King getting clean from drugs and alcohol, drummer Hugh O'Neill leaving due to health issues and bassist B-Face moving over to the Groovie Ghoulies. The lineup change also caused their longtime label Lookout! Records to drop them. With new members Geoff Useless and Rick Respectable, the band released Everything's O.K. EP which became their first release on Hopeless Records. The band followed that up by recording Punk Rock Confidential in Big Sound Studios, in Westbrook, ME and Sonic Iguana in Lafayette, IN. The liner notes for the album list the band as Joe Queer on guitar and vocals, Jon Cougar Concentration Camp members Dangerous Dave and Chris Cougar Concentration Camp (aka Chris Field) on guitars and bass respectively and Steve Stress on drums. Additionally, it expresses gratitude in particular to bass guitarist Jeff Useless.

== Punk Rock Confidential Revisited ==
Due to issues with royalties, the band decided to re-record the album as they didn't have the rights to re-issue it So in 2018, Punk Rock Confidential Revisited was released on vinyl by Asian Man Records and CD by Rad Girlfriend Records.

== Track listing ==
1. "Tamara Is a Punk" – 2:03
2. "Everything's Okay" – 2:12
3. "I Didn't Puke" (Scott “Tulu” Gildersleeve) – 1:05
4. "Mrs. Brown, You've Got an Ugly Daughter" (Song Title inspired by Herman's Hermits) – 2:48
5. "The Sun Always Shines Around You" – 3:05
6. "Rancid Motherfucker" – 1:51
7. "Punk Rock Confidential" – 1:45
8. "Today I Fell in Love" – 3:11
9. "Pretty Flamingo" (Manfred Mann) – 2:10
10. "Motherfucker" – 1:55
11. "Like a Parasite" (Ben “Weasel” Foster & Joe “Queer” King) – 2:52
12. "Idiot Savant" – 2:39
13. "I Enjoy Being a Boy" (The Banana Splits) – 3:30
14. "Don't Mess It Up" – 3:28
15. "Sayonara Sucker" – 3:40
16. "Punk Rock Confidential Revisited (hidden track)" - 0:53

== Album cover ==
The cover is a colorized production photo from the film "Santo el Enmascarado de Plata vs. La invasión de los marcianos (El Santo vs. The Martian Invasion)." This was a vehicle for Mexican professional wrestler 'El Santo'.

== Personnel ==
- Joe Queer – Guitar, Lead Vocals
- Dangerous Dave – Guitar, Vocals
- Geoff Useless – Bass
- Chris Fields – Drums

NOTE – Due to a royalty issue, Hopeless Records lists Chris Fields on Bass and Steve Stress on Drums even though they never actually saw any sort of royalty.
