= Beyond the Valley... =

Beyond The Valley...

Studio album by The Queers
- Released: May 16, 2000
- Genre: Pop punk, punk rock
- Label: Hopeless Records; HR-643

The Queers chronology
Later Days And Better Lays (1999)	Beyond The Valley... (2000)	Live In West Hollywood (2001)

Professional ratings
Review scores
Source	Rating
AllMusic	2.5/5 stars
The Encyclopedia of Popular Music	3/5 stars
Kerrang!	3/5 stars
Pitchfork	6.0/10

Beyond The Valley... is an album by pop-punk band The Queers. It was released in 2000 via Hopeless Records.

== Critical reception ==
Stewart Mason of AllMusic called the album "one of the odder entries in the Queers' extensive catalog," stating that it is "much darker and less overtly funny album than almost anything the band has ever done." Pitchfork writer Michael Sandlin criticized the juvenile quality of the songs, but conceded that they are "more cute and melodic than you might expect" and have "some tasty, ass-kicking lead guitar parts . . . the kind that are quickly becoming extinct in modern rock." The Washington Post wrote: "If attacking a 'punk rock snob' in 'Babyface (Boo-Hoo-Hoo)' is fair comment, many of these tracks traffic in misogyny, homophobia and second-rate hooks. The Queers can still bash out a two-minute rocker with vigor, but this album's attitude is tired."

== Track listing ==
All songs written by Joe Queer, except where noted.

1. "Uncouth" (Chris Barrows, Queer) – 1:39
2. "Little Rich Working Class Oi-Boy" – 1:39
3. "Strangle The Girl" – 2:33
4. "I'm Not A Mongo Anymore" – 1:12
5. "Stupid Fucking Vegan" (Queer, Wimpy Rutherford) – 1:53
6. "In With The Out Crowd" – 2:41
7. "I Wanna Know" – 2:13
8. "Journey To The Center Of Your Empty Fucking Skull" – 2:17
9. "I Hate Your Fucking Guts" – 1:35
10. "Babyface (Boo-Hoo-Hoo)" – 3:30
11. "My Cunt's A Cunt" – 2:02
12. "I Just Called To Say Fuck You" (Queer, Rutherford) – 2:45
13. "Just Say Cunt" – 1:37
14. "Theme From Beyond The Valley Of The Assfuckers" – 5:10

== Personnel ==
- Joe Queer – Vocals, guitar
- Dangerous Dave – Bass, vocals
- Lurch Nobody – Drums, vocals
- Joe Brien – Guitar solos on "Oi Boy" and "Babyface (Boo-Hoo-Hoo)"
- Wimpy Rutherford – Vocals on "I Just Called To Say Fuck You" and "Stupid Fucking Vegan"
