= Pleasant Screams =

Studio album by The Queers
- Released: April 9, 2002; June 19, 2007 (reissue)
- Recorded: Sonic Iguana - Lafayette, IN
- Genre: Pop punk, punk rock
- Label: Lookout! Records; LK-270; Asian Man Records (reissue); ASM-147
- Producer: Mass Giorgini

The Queers chronology
Live In West Hollywood (2001)	Pleasant Screams (2002)	Summer Hits No. 1 (2004)

Professional ratings
Review scores
Source	Rating
Allmusic	link
Punknews.org	link
Robert Christgau	(2-star Honorable Mention)

Pleasant Screams is the eighth album by pop punk band The Queers and the sixth album released on Lookout! Records before they rescinded their master rights from the label. It was reissued by Asian Man Records with bonus tracks, all from the Today EP.

== Track listing ==
All songs written by Joe Queer, except where noted.

1. "Get a Life and Live It" - 1:58
2. "See Ya Later Fuckface" (King/Weasel) - 1:58
3. "I Wanna Be Happy" (Ramone/King/Weasel) - 3:05
4. "Danny Vapid" - 2:03
5. "I Never Got the Girl" - 2:55
6. "It's Cold Outside" (The Choir) - 2:47
7. "Psycho Over You" (Weasel/Dirty Walter) - 2:33
8. "Generation of Swine" - 1:53
9. "Tic Tic Toc" (Metal Mike Saunders) - 1:58
10. "I Don't Want You Hanging Around" (Weasel) - 2:17
11. "Homo" - 1:57
12. "You Just Gotta Blow My Mind" (Donovan) - 2:15
13. "Debbie Be True" (Fantastic Baggies) - 2:09
14. "Molly Neuman" - 14:40

== Reissue bonus tracks ==
1. "Yeah Well Whatever" - 2:01
2. "I Don't Wanna Go to the Moon" - 1:56
3. "I've Had It with You" - 1:04
4. "I'm the Boy for You" - 2:38
5. "Salt Lake City" (The Beach Boys cover) - 2:25

== Personnel ==
- Joe Queer - Guitar, Vocals
- Dangerous Dave - Bass, Keyboards, Vocals
- Matt Drastic - Drums
- Gretchen Smear - Lead Vocals on "You Just Gotta Blow My Mind"
- Philip Hill - Guitar, Vocals
- Dan Lumley - Drums on "Molly Neuman"
