= Grow Up (The Queers album) =

- Cover of the original release

Studio album by the Queers
- Released: 1990
- Recorded: 1986–1988
- Studio: Fort Apache South, Boston
- Genre: Punk rock
- Length: 34:23
- Label: Shakin' Street (YEAH-HUP 010)
- Producer: Sean Slade

The Queers chronology
Kicked Out of the Webelos (1984)	Grow Up (1990)	A Proud Tradition (1992)

Grow Up is the debut album by the American punk rock band the Queers. Recorded in multiple sessions between 1986 and 1988, with various band members and session musicians backing singer and guitarist Joe King (aka Joe Queer), it was originally released as an LP record in 1990 by British label Shakin' Street Records. However, the label went out of business after only 1,000 copies were pressed. The Queers had more copies pressed themselves, continuing to list Shakin' Street as the record label, but when they failed to pay their bill the pressing plant destroyed all but approximately 160 copies, which the band released with a photocopied album cover.

In 1993 the Queers signed to Lookout Records, who released their second album, Love Songs for the Retarded. Lookout reissued Grow Up the following year, altering the cover art and track order and having the album remixed by Ben Weasel of the band Screeching Weasel. After the Queers rescinded their master recordings from Lookout in 2006, Grow Up was reissued by Asian Man Records the following year; for this edition, the cover art and track order were altered again and the album was remixed by King, former Queers guitarist JJ Rassler, and Mass Giorgini, who had engineered and produced many of the band's later records. Five demo tracks recorded in 1986 were also added to this edition. A remastered edition of the original album, in its original mix, was released in 2025.

== Background and recording ==
Since forming in 1981, the Queers had gone through several lineups centered around singer and guitarist Joe King, aka Joe Queer. On their debut EP Love Me (1982), the lineup was King, bassist Scott "Tulu" Gildersleeve, and drummer Jack "Wimpy Rutherford" Hayes. On 1984's Kicked Out of the Webelos EP, Wimpy had switched to lead vocals and Tulu to drums, with King on guitar and Keith Hages on bass. By 1986 drummer Hugh O'Neill had joined and Bobby Gaudreau was the band's singer, with King and bassist Kevin Kecy. This lineup recorded a demo session at Fort Apache Studios in Roxbury, Boston, with John Felice of the Real Kids as record producer. They had also asked JJ Rassler, former guitarist of DMZ and then of the Odds, to produce; The Queers had befriended Rassler through Kecy, and had played as openers for the Odds on several occasions. Rassler showed up to the recording session, but did not stay since Felice was already producing. The recordings from this session went unreleased until Grow Up was reissued in 2007.

Gaudreau's time as the band's singer was brief; After his departure, Rassler joined the Queers as second guitarist and vocalist. "Joe was trying to teach me the tunes," he later recalled, "and the more he kept singing them, the more I added harmonies and lead fills. So after an hour of him saying 'You sing this lead' and me saying 'OK, you sing this back-up' we just said fuck it, you sing what you're trying to teach me and I'll sing what I'm trying to teach you. It immediately sounded great." King and Rassler began writing songs together, several of which would be recorded for what became Grow Up.

Kecy took a leave of absence from the band due to health issues and was replaced by Evan Shore, who played with the Queers for a year and later recalled that during that time "we had only one full band rehearsal, which was really my audition where we simply ran through their live set." The lineup of King, Rassler, O'Neill, and Shore recorded a session at Fort Apache with Sean Slade as recording engineer and Jimmy Miller, a record producer best known for his work with the Rolling Stones. King, Rassler, and Shore all later wrote that, in lieu of payment, Miller asked that the band bring him ingredients for his favorite martinis and promise to buy drugs from him. "A win/win situation if ever we saw one", said King; "It was a mess from the start as almost everyone was gone on drugs and booze. Evan and Sean were the only sober ones." Miller's contribution was minimal, according to Shore: "He basically just hovered over Sean, martini in hand, pointing to various dials and making subtle suggestions." During this session the band recorded takes of the instrumentals "Strip Search" and "Squid Omelette", the latter titled after a dish that a friend had recently ordered at a restaurant. They also recorded "Rambo Rat" and one other song, but were not able to finish versions of "I Met Her at the Rat" and "I Don't Wanna Get Involved with You" due to running out of time to complete overdubbing and mixing. They also ran out of money and could not pay the studio for the session, so Fort Apache refused to turn over the tapes. To raise the funds, the Queers played a benefit which they called "Queerstock" at a local bar; though the show ran late and the band only got to play three songs, they were able to raise enough money to purchase the tapes from the studio. Like the Felice-produced session, these recordings went unused until the 2007 reissue of Grow Up.

According to King, the material on the original release of Grow Up came from three separate recording sessions conducted at Fort Apache, all produced and engineered by Slade.^{[I]} O'Neill joined another band called the Two Saints and went on a European tour with them, so for one of the sessions the Queers brought in Jeebs and Magoo Piranha, of Boston band the Piranha Brothers, to play drums and bass, respectively. Reviewing the album's master tapes in 2007, King and Rassler tried to determine which drummers and bassists played on which recordings, but could not identify them all. "Back then it was a revolving door as far as the lineup", said King. "The bass players kept coming and going. At various times we had Kevin Kecy, Greg Urbaitis, Evan Shore, and Magoo Piranha. I even ended up overdubbing some bass parts myself. Hugh and I would have periodic fights so Jeebs Piranha played drums on a couple of songs. Sean Rowley played rhythm guitar somewhere but don't ask me on what." They concluded that the Piranha brothers played on "Squid Omelet" and "Strip Search", and possibly on "Burger King Queen", and that King, Rassler, and O'Neill played on everything else. When the original album was reissued in 2025, the Piranhas were credited as having played on "Squid Omelet", "Junk Freak", "Burger King Queen", and "Strip Search".

== Reissues ==
The Queers' second album, Love Songs for the Retarded, was released in 1993 by Lookout Records. Produced by Ben Weasel, who had brought the band to the attention of label head Larry Livermore, it was recorded by Mass Giorgini at his Sonic Iguana Studio in Lafayette, Indiana. It sold well, and the label made plans to re-release Grow Up. The original mix tapes could not be found, so Weasel remixed the album for its reissue on Lookout, but the basic production level of the original recordings made it difficult for him to improve the sound of the tracks. Livermore was uncomfortable with some of the lyrics, particularly the song "Gay Boy" and the line "we may be the Queers but we ain't no fags" in "Junk Freak", worrying that fans of the label would find them homophobic. "Joe and Hugh came from a different generation, both culturally and chronologically, than most Lookout punks", he later wrote. "They'd grown up—as had I—during a time when the casual use of terms like 'fags' was so common that most people barely even noticed, let alone thought about it." Feeling that removing the offending songs would necessitate new artwork, make the album too short, and change its "basic character", while re-recording the songs or editing out the lyrics would "sound like crap", he settled on having the band include a disclaimer in the new liner notes stating "We know some of these lyrics are pretty insensitive but we didn't write these songs to hurt anybody's feelings. We are older now and even if we aren't any smarter, we're not as dumb either." He later reflected that this was not very effective:

It wasn't ideal. Even with the disclaimer, I felt ambivalent about the record. But it had so many great songs—and only a couple troublesome ones—that it seemed a shame not to put it out. Certain people, of course, weren't going to be happy no matter what we did. Some were offended that I released Grow Up at all; others were outraged that I was trying to "censor" the Queers.

In 2006 the Queers followed several other former Lookout artists in rescinding their master tapes and licensing rights from the label, invoking a clause in their contract citing delinquent royalty payments. They signed to Asian Man Records, who reissued all of the band's Lookout albums in 2007, each having been remixed and remastered by Giorgini at Sonic Iguana. For Grow Up the track order and artwork were altered again (though all editions use the same cover photograph of King, taken by Harry Bartlett) and King and Rassler assisted with the remixing. Different takes of "Junk Freak" and "Rambo Rat" were used than had appeared on the original album, including the version of "Rambo Rat" recorded with bassist Evan Shore and produced by Jimmy Miller; King explained that these were intended to be the versions on the original release, but he had switched them for different takes "against my better judgment, and the wishes of Hugh" because he was fighting with Rassler at the time, and that the versions on the reissue "are far better than the ones on the old Lookout release. JJ absolutely rips it up on both these songs".

The 2007 reissue also added the five tracks from the 1986 John Felice-produced demo session, with Bobby Gaudreau singing and Kevin Kecy on bass, as bonus tracks. The master tapes had been lost, so for this release the tracks were mastered from a Compact Cassette copy of the recordings which Gaudreau sent to King. They include an early version of "Feeling Groovy", which was later re-recorded for Love Songs for the Retarded; on the demo version, the tape ended before the song concluded, so King, Rassler, and Giorgini looped the tape to end the track. The demo also includes early versions of "Gay Boy" and "Goodbye California", with King singing the lead vocal on the latter track and Gaudreau singing backups, since Gaudreau had difficulty hitting some of the notes. The remaining demo tracks are a cover version of Iggy Pop's "Dog Food", followed by "Slug", a song written by Joey Ramone for the Ramones. In his liner notes for the release, King recalled the thrill of exchanging songs with one of his idols:

Joey Ramone sent us a cassette of a song called "Slug" he wrote that Johnny Ramone didn't want to do. We started playing it and no one believed it was by the Ramones as it wasn't on any Ramones albums at that time. Joey told us he wanted to record "Love Love Love" and we should do "Slug". The Ramones never did record "Love Love Love" but we were more than happy to record "Slug". Having Joey say he wanted to do our song was a thrill I will never forget.

A demo recording of "Slug", recorded by the Ramones, did eventually surface on the 1990 compilation album All the Stuff (And More) Volume Two. For the Grow Up reissue, King, Rassler, and Shore wrote new liner notes reflecting on this period of the Queers' history and on the various recording sessions that comprised the album.

In 2025 King reissued the original mix of Grow Up on his All Star Records label in a remastered form, with new liner notes again describing the recording sessions and lineup changes that gone into the making of the album.

== Reception ==
Reviewing the 1994 edition of Grow Up, Stewart Mason of AllMusic remarked, "Coming after 1993's excellent Love Songs for the Retarded, Grow Up's flaws are pretty obvious: near bootleg-quality sound, a comparative lack of catchy tunes, and some of leader Joe King's most obnoxious lyrics. On the other hand, 'Junk Freak' is an entertaining statement of purpose, and 'Gay Boy' finally addresses the suspicions of homophobia surrounding the band's name (as do King's revised liner notes on the Lookout! release). More to the point, two songs illustrate what makes King's more puerile moments worthwhile; the winsome pop-punk love songs 'I'll Be True to You' and 'I Met Her at the Rat', a giddy tale of punk rock love set at Boston's famed punk club, are sweet, funny, and bubblegum-level catchy. This is the side of the Queers that King would develop more fully in later releases."

== Track listing ==
All tracks are written by Joe Queer, except where noted.

No.	Title	Length
1.	"Squid Omelet"	2:14
2.	"Junk Freak"	3:28
3.	"Love Love Love"	3:04
4.	"Boobarella"	3:05
5.	"I Met Her at the Rat"	3:12
6.	"I'll Be True to You" (written by Gerry Goffin and Russ Titelman; originally performed by the Hollies as "Yes I Will")	3:12
7.	"Goodbye California"	2:24
8.	"Rambo Rat"	3:03
9.	"Gay Boy"	3:03
10.	"Burger King Queen" (written by Queer and JJ Rassler)	2:45
11.	"I Don't Wanna Get Involved with You"	2:28
12.	"Strip Search" (written by Queer and Rassler)	2:25
Total length:		34:23

1994 Lookout Records reissue track listing
No.	Title	Length
1.	"Squid Omelet"	2:14
2.	"Love Love Love"	3:04
3.	"Boobarella"	3:05
4.	"I Met Her at the Rat"	3:12
5.	"I'll Be True to You" (written by Gerry Goffin and Russ Titelman; originally performed by the Hollies as "Yes I Will")	3:12
6.	"Burger King Queen" (written by Queer and JJ Rassler)	2:45
7.	"Junk Freak"	3:28
8.	"Gay Boy"	3:03
9.	"Rambo Rat"	3:03
10.	"I Don't Wanna Get Involved with You"	2:28
11.	"Goodbye California"	2:24
12.	"Strip Search" (written by Queer and Rassler)	2:25
Total length:		34:23

2007 Asian Man Records reissue track listing
No.	Title	Length
1.	"Squid Omelet"	2:14
2.	"Goodbye California"	2:24
3.	"Rambo Rat"	3:35
4.	"Burger King Queen" (written by Queer and JJ Rassler)	2:45
5.	"Junk Freak"	3:54
6.	"I Don't Wanna Get Involved with You"	2:28
7.	"Gay Boy"	3:03
8.	"I Met Her at the Rat"	3:12
9.	"Boobarella"	3:05
10.	"Love Love Love"	3:04
11.	"I'll Be True to You" (written by Gerry Goffin and Russ Titelman; originally performed by the Hollies as "Yes I Will")	3:12
12.	"Strip Search" (written by Queer and Rassler)	2:25
13.	"Feeling Groovy" (1986 demo)	3:45
14.	"Dog Food" (1986 demo; written and originally performed by Iggy Pop)	2:59
15.	"Slug" (1986 demo; written by Joey Ramone; originally performed by the Ramones)	2:14
16.	"Gay Boy" (1986 demo)	3:27
17.	"Goodbye California" (1986 demo)	2:23
Total length:		50:09

== Personnel ==
On the original Shakin' Street release of Grow Up, the members of the Queers are listed as Joe King, Hugh O'Neill, Sean Rowley, and Greg Urbaitis, with JJ Rassler, Kevin Kecy, and Magoo and Jeebs Piranha credited as session players. The edition self-released by the Queers after Shakin' Street went out of business lists only the band's 1990 lineup of King, O'Neill, and B-Face (Chris Barnard). The 1994 edition released by Lookout Records lists this lineup and also credits Rassler, Urbaitis, and the Piranhas as session players, but omits Rowley and Kecy. The 2007 reissue on Asian Man Records lists the band members as King, Rassler, and O'Neill, with the rest of the contributors listed as session players, including Bobby Gaudreau on the bonus tracks; Evan Shore is unlisted, but his role in the recordings is discussed in the liner notes, along with his account of the recording session he took part in. As mentioned above, King and Rassler could not determine on which tracks King, Urbaitis, and Kecy played bass guitar, or which tracks Rowley contributed to. The 2025 reissue of the album's original mix credits King, Rassler, O'Neill, and Urbaitis as the band members and Kecy, the Piranhas, Shore, and Rowley as session players, with the Piranhas credited as playing on four tracks. The list below is adapted from these different sets of album notes.

The Queers

- Joe Queer (Joe King) – guitar on all tracks; lead vocals on all tracks except 13–16 on 2007 edition (performed backing vocals on these tracks); bass guitar (tracks indeterminate); remixing and remastering of 2007 edition
- JJ Rassler – guitar and backing vocals on tracks 1–12 (all editions); remixing and remastering of 2007 edition
- Hugh O'Neill – drums and backing vocals on all tracks except "Squid Omelet", "Junk Freak", "Burger King Queen", and "Strip Search"

Additional musicians

- Bobby Gaudreau – lead vocals on tracks 13–16 of 2007 edition; backing vocals on track 17 of 2007 edition
- Kevin Kecy – bass guitar (tracks indeterminate, but including tracks 13–17 of 2007 edition)
- Jeebs Pirhana – drums on "Squid Omelet", "Junk Freak", "Burger King Queen", and "Strip Search"
- Magoo Pirhana – bass guitar on "Squid Omelet", "Junk Freak", "Burger King Queen", and "Strip Search"
- Sean Rowley – rhythm guitar (tracks indeterminate)
- Evan Shore – bass guitar on the 2007 edition version of "Rambo Rat"
- Greg Urbaitis – bass guitar (tracks indeterminate)

Production

- Sean Slade – audio engineer of all tracks except 13–17 on 2007 edition, producer of all tracks except 3 and 13–17 on 2007 edition
- John Felice – audio engineer and producer of tracks 13–17 on 2007 edition
- Jimmy Miller – producer of "Rambo Rat" on 2007 edition
- Ben Weasel – remixing of 1994 edition
- Mass Giorgini – remixing and remastering of 2007 edition

Artwork

- Harry Bartlett – photographs
- Jack Stevenson – design
- Chris Appelgren – graphic construction of 1994 edition
- Yosef Glushien – layout of 2007 edition

== Notes ==
I In his notes for the 2007 reissue of Grow Up, King states that the material on this edition was recorded at four different sessions, the earliest of which is the 1986 demo produced by John Felice (material from which was only included on the 2007 reissue, not the original release or the 1994 reissue). He also states that the version of "Rambo Rat" used on this reissue (in place of the one on the original and 1994 editions) came from the Jimmy Miller-produced session with Shore on bass, but that "we never used anything from that session until now." In his notes for the 2025 reissue of the album's original mix, King states that the material on the original version came from three different recording sessions, all conducted at Fort Apache with producer and engineer Sean Slade.
