= Love Songs for the Retarded =

Studio album by the Queers
- Released: April 13, 1993
- Recorded: November 7–8, 1992
- Studios: Sonic Iguana, Lafayette, Indiana
- Genre: Punk rock
- Length: 36:00
- Label: Lookout! (LK 066)
- Producer: Ben Weasel

The Queers chronology
| A Proud Tradition (1992) | Love Songs for the Retarded (1993) | Too Dumb to Quit! (1993) |

Love Songs for the Retarded is the second studio album by the American punk rock band the Queers, released in 1993 by Lookout! Records. It was the first of five studio albums the band would record for Lookout!, and their first by the lineup of singer and guitarist "Joe Queer" King, bassist Chris "B-Face" Barnard, and drummer Hugh O'Neill. It was also their first collaboration with Screeching Weasel frontman Ben Weasel, who produced the album and co-wrote two of its songs (he would also produce the band's next two studio efforts, and co-wrote a number of songs with King which were used on later Queers and Screeching Weasel records), and the first of three Queers albums recorded at Sonic Iguana Studio in Lafayette, Indiana, with audio engineer Mass Giorgini, who would continue to work with the band on and off for the next 14 years as a producer and engineer. Love Songs for the Retarded became the Queers' highest-selling album, with sales surpassing 100,000 copies.

After the Queers rescinded their master recordings from Lookout! in 2006, Love Songs for the Retarded was reissued by Asian Man Records the following year, having been remixed and remastered by Giorgini.

== Background ==
The Queers had gone through a number of lineup changes and periods of inactivity before the lineup of singer, songwriter, and guitarist "Joe Queer" King, drummer Hugh O'Neill, and bassist Chris "B-Face" Barnard solidified in 1990. By 1991 King was co-owner of a café and bar in Exeter, New Hampshire called Joe's Place, where O'Neill and Barnard worked as dishwashers. Around this time King befriended Ben Weasel, whose band Screeching Weasel soon signed to Berkeley, California-based Lookout! Records. The Queers' goals at the time were modest: "Things were desperate", King later recalled, "I made no money to speak of. We just wanted to do one great punk rock album that we'd release ourselves and play with Screeching Weasel at least once." To this end, in May 1991 the band recorded a 14-song demo tape of new material to send to Weasel (9 of these songs would be recorded for Love Songs for the Retarded, while 3 more would be recorded for 1994's Beat Off; the entire demo tape was later included on the 1999 compilation album Later Days and Better Lays).

Upon listening to the band's new songs, Weasel suggested to Lookout! head Larry Livermore that he sign the Queers to the label, and convinced King to send Livermore a copy of the demo. "The songs were irresistibly melodic;" Livermore recalled in his 2015 memoir, "a couple of the slower numbers, heavily influenced by doo-wop and the Beach Boys, were almost heartbreakingly beautiful. Joe King was ten years younger than me, but we'd obviously grown up listening to a lot of the same music." He felt the demo was almost good enough to put out itself, but thought it worth getting the band into a studio to re-record it with better production. He contacted King at Joe's Place and offered to sign the Queers to Lookout!: "My cook Don answered the phone and said it was Larry Livermore", King recalled in 2014. "I of course knew what that meant—though I'd never spoken to him—and he asked if we wanted to do a record with them because he liked our songs." King asked Weasel to serve as record producer, and Livermore traveled to Chicago to meet the Queers, who were staying there with Weasel. Livermore was pleased to find that he got along well with the band, especially King, who shared Weasel's fondness for wisecracks and stories but was easier-going, less cynical and acerbic. With Weasel already having assured King that Lookout! was reliable when it came to paying its bands, a deal was quickly struck.

== Recording ==
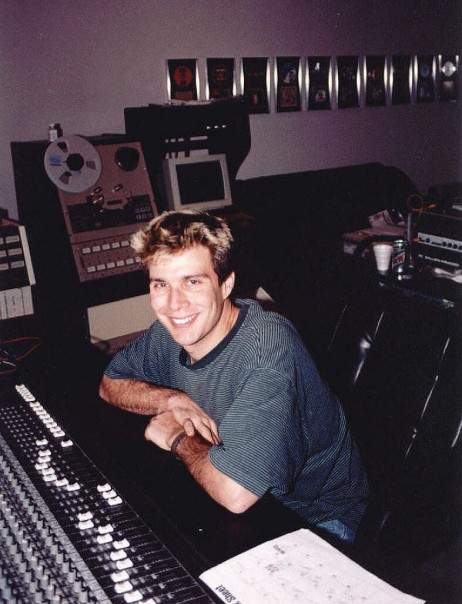
Love Songs for the Retarded was the first Queers album recorded with Mass Giorgini (pictured in 1996), who would work on six more of their studio albums.

Love Songs for the Retarded was recorded in November 1992 with audio engineer Mass Giorgini at his Sonic Iguana Studio in Lafayette, Indiana, where Screeching Weasel had recorded their album Wiggle that summer. King, B-Face, and King's roommate Harlan rented a cargo van and drove over 1,000 miles from the band's hometown of Portsmouth, New Hampshire to Chicago, meeting up with Livermore, Weasel, and Screeching Weasel guitarist Dan Vapid to head south to Lafayette. O'Neill, who was flying out from Boston, missed his flight and did not arrive to the studio until the afternoon of recording. According to the album's liner notes, the recording session lasted from 9:30 PM on Saturday, November 7 to 9:30 PM the following day "with about five hours in between for an uneasy slumber".

At the time, the Queers were heavy drinkers and regular drug users. B-Face later recalled "We partied like crazy. It's all I knew—I had no idea there were other punk bands that weren't like us [...] Lord knows Joe and Hugh did [...] I generally just stuck to booze, although I got my first taste of hard drugs from those guys." This party lifestyle followed them into the studio, as Livermore recalled: "If you've seen the [album] cover photo—a bleary-eyed band surrounded by a staggering array of bottles—you'll have some idea what the recording session looked like [...] I was tempted to say something as I helped unload cases of Budweiser along with the band's signature bass cabinet with its spray-painted slogan, 'THE QUEERS ARE HERE'. But I kept my mouth shut [...] Ben had the sense to go easy on his own drinking, and Mass didn't drink at all, but a couple band members were on the way to being completely blotto by the time we were done setting up the mics." Nevertheless, he found that the band was so well-rehearsed that their intoxication hardly affected their performance, the songs flowing almost effortlessly while Giorgini worked eagerly and Weasel kept everyone on task: "Ben was determined to crank out [the album] in two days flat. He approached it the same way he had [Screeching Weasel's 1991 album] My Brain Hurts: one or two takes and done for nearly every song [...] It helped immensely, too, that the band came in with a fully developed and rehearsed set of songs. In all my years working with the Queers, it was the only time that would happen."

King similarly recalled the session going swiftly, but felt that the material on the demo tape was better in some respects because the band had been more relaxed and not as rushed as they were during the album session: "We busted out all the songs and the next day [O'Neill] few out around 2 PM. I did vocals and we banged it out quick. It was fun, though all of us in the Queers knew we could have done better at home. Still, if Lookout was paying for it we were honored to go do it. Ben was a real inspiration, as even then I highly respected his songwriting." Weasel shares writing credit with King on two of the album's tracks, "Fuck the World" and "I Can't Stop Farting". A version of "Fuck the World" recorded by Screeching Weasel was later included on the 2005 reissue of Wiggle. "I Can't Stand You" was written by Ron Nole, a.k.a. Ronnie Parasite, of the New Jersey punk band the Parasites.

Though uncredited, Livermore and the others at the studio performed gang vocals on the album, including the songs "You're Tripping" and "I Hate Everything". To his disappointment, Livermore "couldn't quite nail" the backing vocals on "Debra Jean", despite having practiced the song for weeks in advance. King's roommate Harlan performed the guitar lead on "Night of the Livid Queers". B-Face did the artwork and layout for the LP sleeve and insert, to which Lookout's Chris Appelgren added illustrations including a "borrowed" Felix the Cat comic strip in which Felix demonstrates the five senses by getting drunk, and an image of Felix playing the banjo from the 1927 Educational Pictures feature Uncle Tom's Crabbin'; Appelgren later developed this into the "Queers cat", a character he included in the artwork of several of the band's subsequent releases. He also adapted B-Face's layout for the compact disc release of the album.

== Reception ==
Reviewing Love Songs for the Retarded for AllMusic, Kembrew McLeod said that "most of the album alternates between the guitar-driven pure pop craft of 'Daydreaming' and the less melodic, raging punk of 'Monster Zero'. It is, nonetheless, a giant leap from their first album, Grow Up." Critic Robert Christgau gave the album an honorable mention, summarizing that "for 16 songs in 36 minutes, they [heart] Ramones and rhyme with 'beers'."

== Reissue ==
In 2006 the Queers followed several other former Lookout! artists in rescinding their master tapes and licensing rights from the label, invoking a clause in their contract citing delinquent royalty payments. They signed to Asian Man Records, who reissued all of the band's Lookout! albums in 2007, each having been remixed and remastered by Giorgini at Sonic Iguana. For its reissue, Love Songs for the Retarded was given new artwork derived from the original LP release. This version of the album was re-released in 2017 by Rad Girlfriend Records.

== Track listing ==
All tracks are written by Joe Queer, except where noted

| No. | Title | Length |
|---|---|---|
| 1. | "You're Tripping" | 1:52 |
| 2. | "Ursula Finally Has Tits" | 2:32 |
| 3. | "I Hate Everything" | 1:23 |
| 4. | "Teenage Bonehead" | 2:20 |
| 5. | "Fuck the World" (written by Queer and Ben Weasel) | 2:31 |
| 6. | "I Can't Stop Farting" (written by Queer and Weasel) | 1:45 |
| 7. | "Feeling Groovy" | 2:21 |
| 8. | "Debra Jean" | 3:27 |
| 9. | "Hi Mom, It's Me!" | 0:59 |
| 10. | "Noodlebrain" | 2:27 |
| 11. | "I Can't Stand You" (written by Ronnie Parasite) | 1:16 |
| 12. | "Night of the Livid Queers" | 2:20 |
| 13. | "Granola-Head" | 2:24 |
| 14. | "I Won't Be" | 2:10 |
| 15. | "Monster Zero" | 2:17 |
| 16. | "Daydreaming" | 3:49 |
| Total length: | | 36:00 |

== Personnel ==
Credits adapted from the album's liner notes.

The Queers

- Joe Queer (Joe King) – lead vocals, guitar
- B-Face (Chris Barnard) – bass guitar, backing vocals
- Hugh O'Neill – drums, backing vocals, artwork, layout

Production

- Ben Weasel – producer
- Mass Giorgini – audio engineer; remixing and remastering of 2007 reissue

Artwork

- Chris Appelgren – artwork, layout
- Lisa A. Wills – photographs
