= The Queers =

American punk rock band

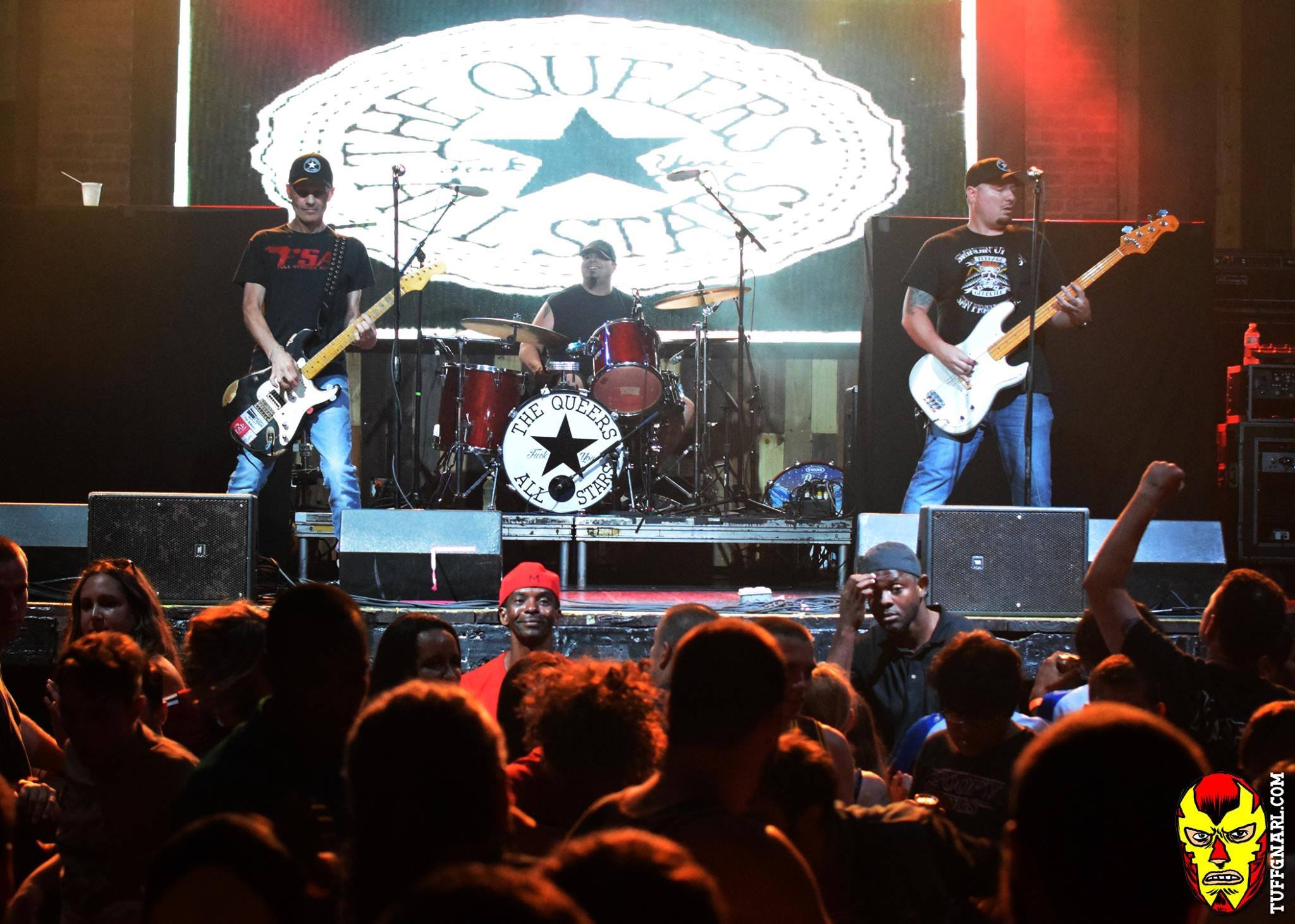
- The Queers live at Revolution in Ft. Lauderdale, FL – June 11, 2017

Background information
- Origin: Portsmouth, New Hampshire
- Genres: Punk rock; pop punk
- Years active: 1981–1984; 1985–1989; 1990–present
- Labels: Lookout!; Asian Man; Hopeless
- Members: Joe Queer; Ginger Fanculo; Hoglog Rehab

The Queers are an American punk rock band, formed in 1981 by Portsmouth, New Hampshire native Joe King (a.k.a. Joe Queer) along with Scott Gildersleeve (a.k.a. Tulu), and Jack Hayes (a.k.a. Wimpy Rutherford). With the addition of Keith Hages (ex-guitarist of Berlin Brats) joining on bass in 1983 the band started playing their first public performances. The revised line-up played a total of six live shows between 1983 and 1984. This earliest era of The Queers formation initially broke up in late 1984; however, Joe Queer re-formed the band with an all-new line-up in 1986. In 1989, after several more band line-up changes the band signed with Shakin' Street Records to released a compilation of sessions from 1986 called Grow Up. The album earned the band notability within New England, their debut album was 1993's Love Songs for the Retarded, on Lookout! Records, their following grew.

In 2006, after releasing six albums on Lookout! Records, the band rescinded their master rights from the label, citing breach of contract over unpaid royalties. Later that year they signed with Asian Man Records.

The Queers' cover of "Wipe Out" was featured in the 2007 Columbia Pictures and ImageWorks Studios mockumentary film Surf's Up, produced by Sony Pictures Animation and National Geographic Films.

The staff of Consequence ranked the band at number 28 on their list of "The 100 Best Pop Punk Bands" in 2019.

== History ==
The Queers were formed in 1981 in Portsmouth, New Hampshire. The original line-up consisted of guitarist/vocalist Joe "Queer" King, bassist Tulu, and drummer Wimpy Rutherford. Tulu introduced Joe Queer and Wimpy Rutherford to The Ramones in 1976 but it would be another five years before they formed the Queers shortly after Joe King returned to New Hampshire having spent a summer in Manhattan Beach, California. While Queer was on the west coast he saw many of the original Los Angeles punk rock bands including the Zeros, the Germs, Black Flag, the Dickies, Fear, and Angry Samoans. All three had previously played in earlier bands before forming the Queers including the Objects, the Falling Spikes, the Bugs, and the Monsignors. Tulu and the Objects released an album in 1980 (recorded live in 1978) and released a solo single in 1981 under his given name. Tulu stated that their band moniker had nothing to do with homosexuality, and meant queer as in someone strange or an outsider.

The 1981–1982 original line-up rehearsed in Tulu's basement but never publicly performed. Their earliest songs were cover songs by the Dave Clark Five, the Monkees, and the Ramones. In 1982 Joe Queer, Tulu, and Wimpy were hanging out and listening to punk rock records that Joe had purchased while living in Manhattan Beach, California and had brought back home to New Hampshire. While the Ramones and Black Flag were the original lineup main influences, two further punk rock records were also a big inspiration for the budding punk rock group. TV Party EP by Black Flag and The Queer Pills EP by the Angry Samoans were significant influences on the groups band moniker, overall sound, rejection of punk rock trendy fashion fads, and irreverent lyric subject matter while the Blood Sausage EP by the Meatmen was the catalyst for writing original songs. After listening to Blood Sausage, the band members were all collectively of the opinion that they could "do much better" and commenced to writing original songs. Tulu then wrote the Queers' first classic, "We'd Have A Riot Doing Heroin", right on the spot "in about two minutes" and the band was born. Their earliest original songs were subsequently recorded on the Queers' debut record. After releasing the Love Me EP, the group disbanded for a few months while Tulu temporarily moved to New York City, New York in late 1982. While the band was on temporary hiatus, Joe and Wimpy got together and over the course of a few hours in one day wrote enough new songs for a new record. A phone call was made to Tulu to inform him that they had written a great new batch of songs, discussed re-forming the band, and recording another EP. After a fortnight, Joe and Wimpy drove to New York City, located Tulu, and drove back to New Hampshire with newfound enthusiasm and confidence. In 1983 the new line-up found Joe remaining on guitar while Wimpy switched from drums to lead vocals (at the insistence of Tulu and Joe) and Tulu from bass to drums, while their friend Keith Hages (ex Berlin Brats) joined on bass. This line-up recorded the Kicked Out of the Webelos EP and performed approximately six live shows (The Masonic Temple, a local pool party, and an outdoor open field gig; all three shows were located in Portsmouth, New Hampshire. The new line-up also played Geno's Rock club in Portland, Maine along with two further shows), and broke up for a second time in 1984. Shortly after the breakup the Webelos EP was released and Wimpy then went to college in Arizona, Tulu moved to Boston, Massachusetts and reformed the Mosignors, while Joe owned a successful restaurant café while remaining in New Hampshire. While never releasing a proper album at the time, the 1996 compilation A Day Late and a Dollar Short compiled the Love Me EP (1982), the Kicked Out of the Webelos EP (1984), a studio session dating from 1993 recording original songs that were written in 1983 but not recorded in the band's original era, demo tracks in 1991, and an East Orange, New Jersey live performance in 1994 on independent community radio station WFMU.

In 1985, Joe formed a new version of the band with DMZ guitarist J. J. Rassler, bassist Kevin Kecy, and drummer Hugh O'Neill. The band broke up again in 1989 after King bought a restaurant, but the next year were re-formed by King and O'Neill, with Sean Rowley on rhythm guitar and new bassist B-Face. Sean Rowley left the band in 1990 to attend art school. In 1989 this line-up released compilation of recordings from 1986 Grow Up, on a small English label called Shakin' Street Records. When Grow Up caught the attention of Screeching Weasel frontman Ben Weasel, he convinced Lookout! Records owner Larry Livermore to sign the Queers, who released their debut album, Love Songs for the Retarded, on Lookout! in 1993. To promote the album, the band went on tours with Screeching Weasel and Rancid.

By now, the band had developed problems with drug and alcohol use. Larry Livermore, who was in the studio with the band for Love Songs for the Retarded, recalled that while Joe King was able to stop drinking, heroin remained an issue for both King and Hugh O'Neill. The other members staged an intervention for O'Neill, who was forced to take a leave of absence from the band to deal with his addiction.

Jay Adelberg filled in on drums, performing on the live album Shout at the Queers; their 1994 cover version of the Ramones' 1977 album Rocket to Russia (released as part of Selfless Records' Ramones covers album series); and "Blabbermouth", their contribution to the 1994 Ben Weasel-curated compilation album Punk USA.

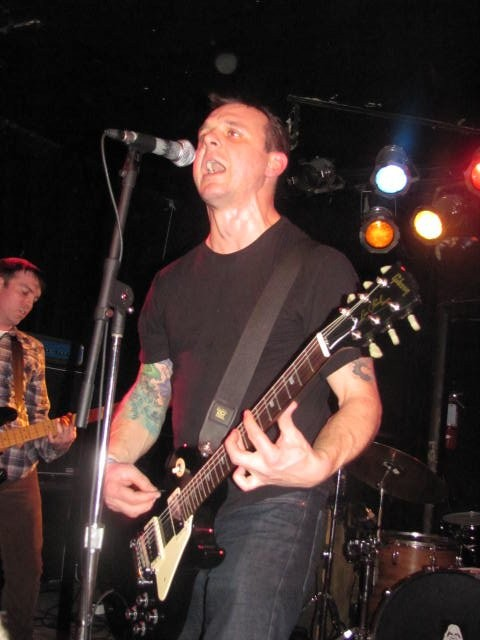
Dan Vapid

The recording for the band's next album, 1994's Beat Off, was scheduled to take place partway through a U.S. tour, but O'Neill was once again sidelined by addiction. The Queers instead recruited Screeching Weasel drummer Dan Panic, and also added his bandmate Dan Vapid as a second guitarist. Panic and Vapid would record Beat Off with the Queers, though Vapid's guitar parts were removed from the album before its release. They also played on the subsequent live album, Suck This (1995), and Vapid would play on 1995's Surf Goddess EP. For the 1995 studio album Move Back Home, O'Neill returned, and the classic line-up of King, B-Face, and O'Neill would record one more album together with 1996's Don't Back Down, which also saw the return of JJ Rassler on guitar. The album also marked the last release with Lookout! Records. The band had been offered a three-album deal with Epitaph Records, which King was in favor of, but B-Face and O'Neill weren't. The rift over this caused King to replace them with bassist Dave Swain from Jon Cougar Concentration Camp, and The Dwarves drummer Chris Fields. After leaving the Queers, B-Face would play bass for Chixdiggit!, the Mopes, and the Groovie Ghoulies, while O'Neill developed brain cancer, dying on January 20, 1999.

In 2014, Joe Queer posted statements in support of Ferguson, Missouri police officer Darren Wilson who shot and killed Michael Brown in what was ultimately ruled self-defense after several investigations. In response to protests and a petition against his comments, the group's promoter cancelled a performance scheduled in Ottawa; according to King, the venue agreed to host the show without the promoter.

== Musical style and influences ==
The Queers play a Ramones-derived style of pop punk. Their lyrics are generally humorous and irreverent, common themes including girls, love, drugs, alcohol and having fun. Musically the band deviates slightly from the driving rhythm guitar sound of the Ramones and augments their songs with harmony vocals and guitar solos. They have been described by Livermore as "The Ramones meets The Beach Boys". Ben Weasel of Screeching Weasel infrequently collaborates on songwriting with Joe Queer. The band is well known for the variety of cover versions they include on their records and during live performances. Bands/artists covered by The Queers include The Beach Boys, Ramones (including a complete re-recording of the Rocket to Russia album), Unnatural Axe, The Nobodys, Angry Samoans, The Mr. T Experience, Skeeter Davis, The Fantastic Baggys, The Who, The Undertones, The Hobos, Tommy James and The Shondells, Helen Love, The Catalogs (from Hawaii, featuring Les Hernandez of The Quintessentials), The Banana Splits and many more.

Tom DeLonge of Blink-182, and Mike Herrera of MxPx, have cited The Queers as an influence. In 2008, a tribute album titled God Save The Queers was released, which featured covers by bands including Dwarves, Screeching Weasel, Teengenerate, New Bomb Turks, The Jolts, Hard-Ons, Toys That Kill, Parasites, Toothless George, and The Unlovables.

== Members ==
Since its formation, the band has gone through a few line-up changes, with Joe Queer as the only constant member. The band currently consists of Joe Queer (guitar/vocals), Ginger Fanculo (bass), and Hoglog Rehab (drums). The first line-up was Joe Queer, Tulu, Keith Hages and Wimpy Rutherford. The mid-1980s line-up was Joe Queer, JJ Rassler, Hugh O'Neill with Kevin Kecy or Evan Shore. The best-known line-up is from the 1990s Lookout Records era: Joe Queer, B-Face and Hugh O'Neill. After leaving Lookout Records, B-Face and Hugh O'Neill left and Dangerous Dave joined. The Queers continue to actively tour and a new record is in the works. In 1999, former drummer Hugh O'Neill died of brain cancer at the age of 41.

Current members

- Joe Queer (a.k.a. Joseph P. King) – guitar, lead vocals (1981–present)
- Alex Martin (a.k.a. Hoglog Rehab) – Drums (2011–present)
- Ginger Fanculo – Guitar/Bass (touring) (2018–present)

Former part-time and fill-in members

- Tulu (a.k.a. Scott Gildersleeve) (bass/drums) (1981–1984, 2001 with "Drunken Cholos" original Queers reunion) (died March 2015)
- Wimpy Rutherford (a.k.a. Jack Hayes) (drums/lead vocals) (1981–1984, 1993, 2001 with "Drunken Cholos" original Queers reunion, "special guest" live gig appearances)
- Keith Hages (bass, backing vocals) (1983-1984)
- Bobby Gaudreau (lead vocals) (1985-1986)
- Kevin Kecy (bass, backing vocals) (1985-1986)
- Hugh O'Neill (a.k.a. Hubie) (drums, backing vocals) (1985-1993, 1995–1998) (died January 20, 1999)
- Joseph Hughes (drums) (1986–1988)
- J.J. Rassler (lead guitar, backing vocals) (1987–1988)
- Evan Shore (bass, backing vocals) (1987–1988)
- Danny McCormack (guitar) (1987-1988)
- Magoo Piranha (bass, backing vocals) (1987–1988)
- Jeebs Piranha (drums) (1987–1988)
- Greg Urbaitis (bass) (1988-1990)
- Young Sean Rowley (a.k.a. Sean Rowley) (guitar) (1988–1990)
- B-Face (a.k.a. Chris Barnard) (bass, backing vocals) (1990–1998)
- Jay Adelberg (drums) (1993)
- Harlan Miller (guitar) (1993)
- Dan Vapid (a.k.a. Dan Schafer) (guitar, backing vocals) (1994, 2002, 2014 Love Songs... tour)
- Danny Panic (a.k.a. Dan Sullivan) (drums) (1994)
- Metal Murf Cretin (a.k.a. Sean Murphy) (guitar) (1995-1997)
- Erick Coleman (guitar) (1995–1996)
- Hunter Oswald (drums) (1995)
- Kato Cretin (guitar) (1996)
- Chris Cougar Concentration Camp (a.k.a. Chris Fields) (guitars, backing vocals) (1997-1999)
- Dangerous Dave (a.k.a. Dave Swain) (bass, backing vocals) (1998-2002, 2007-2015)
- Geoff Palmer (a.k.a. Geoff Useless) (bass, backing vocals) (1998, 2001 with "Drunken Cholos" original Queers reunion, 2006–2007)
- Rick Respectable (a.k.a. Rick Orcutt) (drums, backing vocals) (1998)
- Steve Stress (a.k.a. Steve Visneau) (drums) (1998–2000)
- Lurch Nobody (a.k.a. Justin Disease) (drums, backing vocals) (2000-2001, 2006-2011)
- Isaac Lane (bass) (2001)
- Phillip Hill (bass, backing vocals) (2002–2006, 2007)
- Matt Drastic (a.k.a. Matt Yonker) (drums) (2002-2004)j
- Dusty Watson (drums, backing vocals) (2004, 2009)
- Dave Trevino (drums) (2004–2006)
- Andrew Griswold (drums) (2005)
- Ben Vermin (bass) (2006, 2007)
- Ryan Kwon Doe (drums) (2006)
- Jeff Dewton (guitar) (2007)
- Adam Woronoff (drums) (2007, 2009-2010)
- Jonathon Mackey (drums) (2010)
- Bear Williams (drums) (2012)
- Josh Goldman (bass, backing vocals) (2013, 2015)
- Wyatt Peterson (bass, backing vocals) (2015)
- Chris May (a.k.a. Cheeto Bandito, a.k.a. Cheeto Mayhem) (bass, backing vocals) (2017–2022)
- Geoff Armstrong (bass) (2018)
- Mick Francis (bass, backing vocals) (2022)
- Robbie Rotten (bass, backing vocals) (2022–2023)
- Alessandro Osella (a.k.a. Ose, a.k.a. Troy Torino) (bass, backing vocals) (2022 40th anniversary Queers tour, 2024, 2026)
- Liquid Drain - O (a.k.a Wayno Barrows) (Lead Dishwasher, Backup Vocals) 1985 The Sparky’s Tour

== Discography ==
Studio albums

- Grow Up (1989) (compilation of recordings from 1986)
- Love Songs for the Retarded (1993)
- Rocket To Russia (1994)
- Beat Off (1994)
- Move Back Home (1995)
- Don't Back Down (1996)
- Punk Rock Confidential (1998)
- Beyond The Valley... (2000)
- Pleasant Screams (2002)
- Munki Brain (2007)
- Back to the Basement (2010)
- Save The World (2020)
- Reverberation (2021)
