= The Black Sheep Band =

Chicago-based punk rock supergroup

- Part of the band at Million Yen Studio

Background information
- Origin: Chicago, Illinois, U.S.
- Genres: Punk rock, post-hardcore, hardcore punk
- Years active: 2010–2011 · 2026
- Label: Underground Communique Records
- Spinoffs: Stiff Little Fingers
- Members: Henry Cluney; Bruce Foxton; Jim Reilly
- Past members: Jake Burns; Eric Spicer; Dan Vapid; Herb Rosen; Gina Knapik; Dan Knapik; Sensitive Pete; Mike Byrne; James Toland; Scott Haynes

The Black Sheep Band is an American punk rock supergroup that made a record for charity in 2011 called A Chicago Punk Rock Collaboration For The Kids, Vol 1. Members of the band include well-known musicians and punk pioneers such as Jake Burns of Stiff Little Fingers, Dan Vapid of Screeching Weasel, Eric Spicer of Naked Raygun, Mike Byrne and Sensitive Pete both of The Methadones, James Toland of Micro Penis, Gina Knapik of Venom Lords, Dan Knapik of Not Rebecca, Herb Rosen from Rights Of The Accused and jazz saxophonist Scott Haynes.

The record was recorded by Jeff Dean of Million Yen Studios (and also guitarist for The Bomb, Noise By Numbers, Dead Ending, Explode and Make up and All Eyes West).

The band has never performed live all together but members of the band have performed some Black Sheep Band songs with their own bands and were joined by other BSB members.

Proceeds of the record benefit Children's Memorial Hospital in Chicago.

== Discography ==
- A Chicago Punk Rock Collaboration For The Kids, Vol 1, 2010
