= Jeff Dean (musician) =

American musician

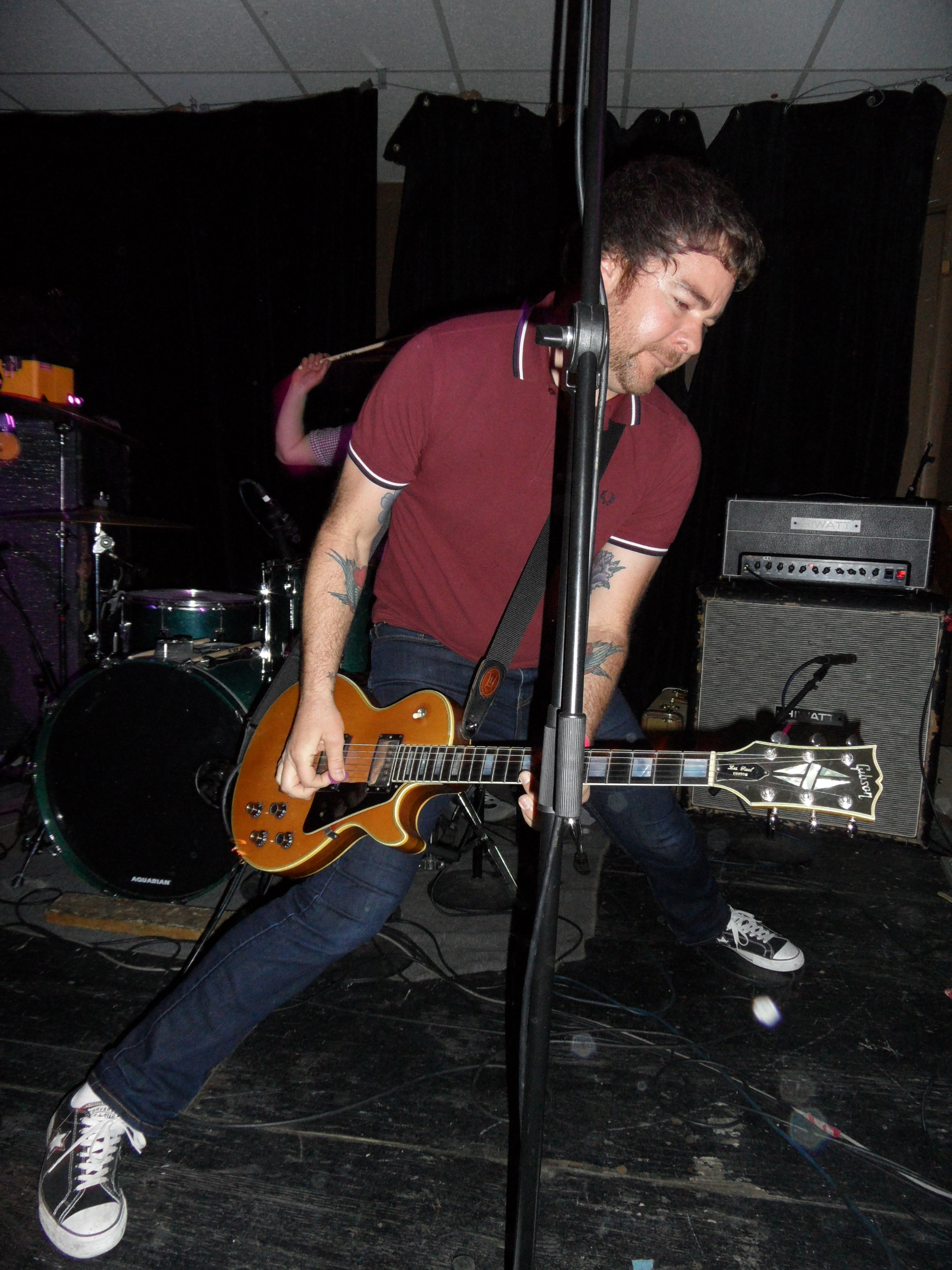

Background information
- Born: Jeffery Dean
- Origin: Las Vegas, Nevada
- Genres: Punk rock, Pop punk, Hard Core
- Occupations: Musician, Recording Engineer
- Instrument: Guitar
- Years active: 1993–present
- Labels: Asian Man, Jump Start, No Idea, Thick

Jeff Dean is a punk rock musician and recording engineer based in Chicago, Illinois. He is best known for playing guitar in The Bomb with Jeff Pezzati of Naked Raygun, and Noise By Numbers with Dan Vapid of The Methadones. He currently plays in Deep Tunnel Project.

In addition to these bands, he is lead guitarist for All Eyes West, Explode and Make Up, and Dead Ending. Dean has also played in Tomorrows Gone, Cleon's Down, Yesterday's Heroes, Zero in Trust, The Story So Far, Four Star Alarm and Certain People I Know. Additional bands he has played, toured, and written with include Faded Grey, Textbook, Horace Pinker, Pink Avalanche and Schizoid. He is a recording engineer at Million Yen Studio in Chicago, IL.

== Tomorrows Gone ==
Jeff Dean got his start in music with Las Vegas-based hardcore band Tomorrows Gone in 1994, joining the group early on in their existence after their original guitarist left the band to play metal. Dean played guitar on all of Tomorrows Gone's releases and temporarily played bass for the band's live shows in 1995. In 1996, Dean moved from Las Vegas to Detroit, while Tomorrows Gone vocalist Lance Wells moved to California. Despite the distance, Dean remained with the band until their breakup in 1997.

== The Bomb ==
The Bomb was formed in 1999 by Jeff Pezzati of Naked Raygun. Producer Steve Albini (Shellac, Big Black) recorded their first two records, 'Arming' and 'Torch Songs'. Current members include Jeff Dean, Sensitive Pete (The Methadones, Naked Raygun) and Mike Soucy (The Methadones, Dan Vapid and the Cheats).

== Noise By Numbers ==
Noise By Numbers started in 2008 with Dan Vapid (vocals, guitar), Jeff Dean (guitar), Rick Uncapher (bass) and Neil Hennessy (drums). Hennessy left after the first album and was replaced by Jimmy Lucido. A second album was released August 2011.

== Dead Ending ==
Formed in Chicago in 2012, Dead Ending is a super group of Chicago-based punk rock musicians Joe Principe (Rise Against) on bass, Derek Grant (Alkaline Trio) on drums, Vic Bondi (Articles of Faith) on vocals and Jeff Dean on guitar.

== All Eyes West ==
A post punk rock band from Chicago featuring Justin Miller on Bass and Jon Drew on drums with Jeff Dean on guitar.

== Discography ==
=== Tomorrows Gone 1993-1997 ===
- S/T 7” – Element Records

Compilations:

- My Parents Went To Las Vegas And All They Bought Me Was This Fucking 7” – Bucky Records
- Making Human Junk – Hybrid Records
- In Words of One Syllable – Catchphraze Records

Collections:

- No Way to Make Time Stand Still 1993-1997 – World On Fire Records
- This Music Will Survive (The Complete Recordings) – Underground Communique Records

=== Yesterdays Heroes 1994-1995 ===
- No Guts, No Glory (CD) – Spartan Records

Compilations:

- Backstreets of American Oi! – Sta Press Records

=== Cleons Down 1995-1997 ===
- S/T 7” – Ulitarian Records

Compilations:

- The Big Fix – Allied Recordings
- The Michigan Compilation – Enerject Records
- Blood, Sweat, and Tears – General Records

Collections:

- I’ve Got a Plan – World On Fire Records

=== Zero In Trust 1997-1998 ===
Compilations:

- Blood, Sweat, and Tears – General Records
- Reveal the Character – Elkion Records

=== The Story So Far 1999 – 2002 ===
- When Fortune Smiled (CD) – Hopeless Records

Compilations:

- Disarming Violence – Fast Music
- Hopeless 50 – Hopeless Records
- The World I Know (A Tribute To Pegboy) – Underground Communique Records

=== The Bomb 2002 – 2014 ===
- Indecision (LP) – Thick/No Idea Records
- Speed is Everything (LP) – No Idea Records
- The Challenger (LP) – No Idea Records
- Axis of Awesome (EP) – No Idea Records

Compilations:

- Mean it Man – Thick Records
- Hair! – Thick Records

=== Four Star Alarm 2006-2008 ===
- S/T (CD) – Thick Records
- Tilted 7” – Underground Communique
- The Siren Sound (CD) – Solidarity Recordings

Compilations:

- Life After SUGAR Tribute – LAS:T Recordings
- Poison The World 3 – Poison City Records
- Hours and Hours: A Tribute to SEAWEED – Engineer Recordings

=== Explode And Make Up 2006 – 2014 ===
- S/T (LP) – Underground Communique
- Hellmouth split 7” – Underground Communique

Compilations:

- Hair! – Thick Records

=== Certain People I Know 2009-2010 ===
- S/T (LP) – Count Your Luck Stars Records

=== Noise By Numbers 2009 – 2012 ===
- Yeah Whatever (LP) – Asian Man Records
- Over Leavitt (LP) – Jump Start Records
- High on Drama (EP) – Jump Start Records
- So Quickly 7” – Art of the Underground Records
- Cheap Girls split 7” – Suburban Home Records
- The Magnificent split 7” – Solidarity Recording

=== All Eyes West 2010 – PRESENT ===
- S/T (LP) – Jump Start Records
- Doomer (LP) – Jump Start Records
- With Wade (EP) – Underground Communique
- Break Anchor split 7” – Sideone Dummy Records
- Above Them split 7” – Jump Start Records
- Easy Creatures split 7” – Jump Start Records
- Like Lightning (LP) – Jump Start Records

=== Dead Ending 2012 – PRESENT ===
- DE 1 (EP) – Alternative Tentacles Records
- DE 2 (EP) – Alternative Tentacles Records
- DE 3 (EP) – Bridge 9 Records
- Class War 7” – Alternative Tentacles Records
- Shoot The Messenger (LP) – Alternative Tentacles Records
- What you believe/Pain Killer 7” – Alternative Tentacles Records

=== Tight Night 2012 – PRESENT ===
- Volume (LP) – Little Rocket Records

=== Moral Mazes 2014 - PRESENT ===
- Magic Tommy Jackson 7” – Bridge 9 Records

=== Airstream Futures 2016 – PRESENT ===
- Great Britain (tour EP)
- Spirale Infernale (LP) - Paper and Plastick Records
- En Avoir Marre (EP)
- IF I/PR Nightmares 7”– Little Rocket Records
- Le Feu et Le Sable (LP) – Little Rocket Records

Compilations:

- Volume One – Serial Bowl Records
- Launch 17 – Little Rocket Records
- Volume 3 – Hell Hath No Fury Records
- The First Five Years – Scary Clown Presents
