= Noise by Numbers =

American pop punk band

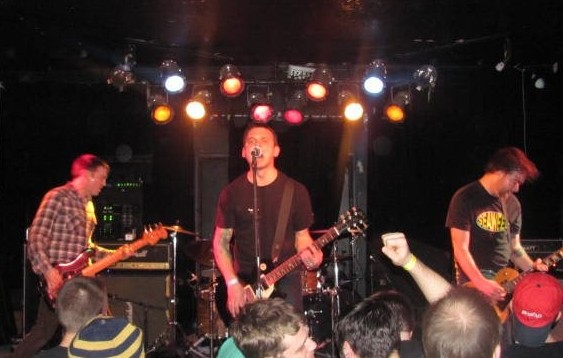
- Noise by Numbers live in Chicago in 2011

Background information
- Origin: Chicago, Illinois, US
- Genres: Pop punk
- Years active: 2008–present
- Labels: Asian Man, Solidarity
- Members: Dan Schafer; Jeff Dean; Rick Uncapher; Jimmy Lucido
- Past members: Neil Hennessy
- Website: noisebynumbers.com

Noise by Numbers is an American pop punk band featuring Dan Schafer (Screeching Weasel, the Queers, the Methadones, Sludgeworth), Jeff Dean (The Bomb, All Eyes West, Four Star Alarm, The Story So Far, Dead Ending), Rick Uncapher (Textbook, Dan Vapid and the Cheats, Woolworthy), and Jimmy Lucido (Nightmare Air). Their sound has been described as reminiscent of Hüsker Dü, the Replacements, Dinosaur Jr., Naked Raygun and the Effigies.

== History ==
The band formed in late 2008 when long-time friends Dan Schafer and Jeff Dean started writing songs together. They recruited bassist Rick Uncapher (Textbook, Woolworthy) and drummer Neil Hennessy (The Lawrence Arms, Smoking Popes) to complete the line up. They recorded their first album, Yeah, Whatever... with Matt Allison at Atlas Studios, which was released in November 2009 on Asian Man Records (CD/Digital) and Solidarity Recordings (vinyl). Hennessy left the band after recording the album and was replaced by Jimmy Lucido (Light FM, The Strays, Bang Bang). The band's second album, Over Leavitt, was recorded by Jeff Dean, produced by Jon Drew (Fucked Up, Tokyo Police Club) and was released August 2, 2011.

Mike Soucy, of The Methadones, has also played drums with the band live.

The band has performed with acts such as Rise Against, Alkaline Trio, Hey Mercedes, Small Brown Bike, Banner Pilot, 88 Fingers Louie, The Bollweevils, and Bomb the Music Industry. They have also taken part in various festivals, including Insubordination Fest, Windy City Sound Clash and Fest 9, and they toured the East Coast in August 2010.

== Members ==
- Dan Schafer - vocals/guitar
- Jeff Dean - guitar
- Rick Uncapher - bass
- Jimmy Lucido - drums

=== Past members ===
- Neil Hennessy - drums

== Reception ==
Jim DeRogatis of the Chicago Sun-Times, said the band "inject a heaping dose of sing-along melody into every propulsive and hard-hitting groove"

Byrne Yancey, of Punknews.org, described the band as a "supergroup".

AMP said "Think early ALKALINE TRIO meets PINHEAD GUNPOWDER East Bay stuff.".

Jordan Baker, of pastepunk.com, described the band as having "an unmistakable Chicago pop-punk sound" with "plenty of infectious melodies".

The band was named as one of the "100 Bands You Need to Know About in 2012" by Alternative Press in the March 2012 issue.

== Discography ==
=== Albums ===
- Yeah, Whatever... (2009, Asian Man, Solidarity)
- Over Leavitt (2011, Jump Start Records)
- High on Drama (EP) (2015, Jump Start Records)

=== Singles ===
- "So Quickly"/"Under The Milky Way" 7" (2009, Art of The Underground Records No. 43)
- "Between Planets" (w/ “My Wandering Days are Over” by Cheap Girls) 7" (2011, Suburban Home Records)
- Split 7" w/ The Magnificent (2011, Solidarity Recordings)

=== Compilation appearances ===
- Plea For Peace (2010, Solidarity) includes "Paris In September"
- Asian Man Records: Vol. 1 (2010, Asian Man) includes "Cold Embrace"
