= Mike Soucy =

American drummer (born 1917)

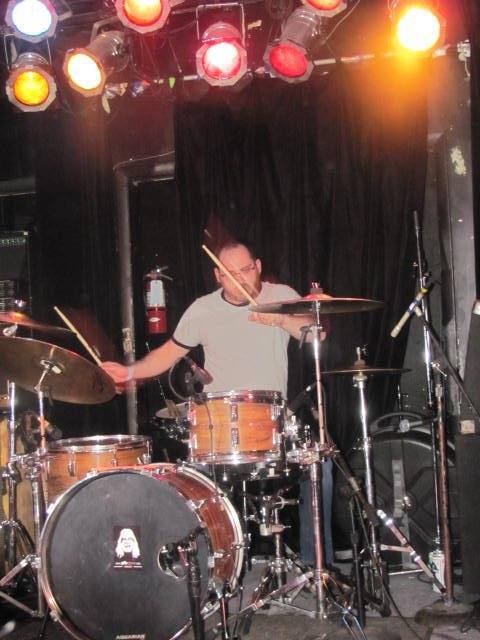

Background information
- Born: Michael Soucy; September 8, 1971 (age 54); Boston, Massachusetts, U.S.
- Origin: Woonsocket, Rhode Island, U.S.
- Genres: Punk rock, Pop punk
- Occupation: Musician
- Instrument: Drums
- Years active: 2003–present
- Labels: No Idea, Thick, Red Scare Industries, Asian Man, Duchess

Michael "Mike" Soucy (born September 8, 1971) was born in Boston, MA and grew up in Woonsocket, RI. Soucy joined The Methadones in 2002 and played with them until their official hiatus in 2011. He is currently the drummer for Airstream Futures and formerly of The Bomb and Dan Vapid and the Cheats and has also played live with Noise By Numbers. Soucy plays the same green Ludwig super classic drums that he bought back in 1992. He alternates between a Pearl Ultracast snare and CandC Drum company snares. He also uses Zildjian cymbals and Vic Firth 3A sticks.

On December 18, 2018, Soucy joined bandmates Dan Vapid and Simon Lamb on stage at the Black Moon Gallery, in Oak Park, IL playing tambourine.

== Partial discography ==
=== The Methadones ===
- Career Objective – Thick Records (2003)
- Not Economically Viable – Thick Records (2004)
- 21st Century Power Pop Riot – Red Scare Industries (2006)
- This Won't Hurt... – Red Scare Industries (2007)
- The Methadones/The Copyrights Split – Transparent Records (2008)
- The Methadones – Asian Man Records (2010)

=== The Bomb ===
- Indecision – No Idea Records (2005)
- Speed Is Everything – No Idea Records (2009)
- The Challenger – No Idea Records (2011)
- Axis of Awesome – No Idea Records (2015)

=== Dan Vapid and the Cheats ===
- Dan Vapid and the Cheats – Torture Chamber Records (2012)
- Two – Torture Chamber Records (2013)

=== Airstream Futures ===
- Spirale Infernale - Paper and Plastick (2018)
