= A Chicago Punk Rock Collaboration for the Kids, Vol 1 =

A Chicago Punk Rock Collaboration For The Kids, Vol 1

EP by The Black Sheep Band
- Released: June 6, 2010
- Recorded: 2010
- Genre: Punk Rock
- Length: 9:46
- Language: English
- Label: Underground Communiqué Records
- Producer: James Toland, Leah Bohannon

A Chicago Punk Rock Collaboration For The Kids, Vol 1 is a 4-song EP by the Chicago Punk Rock super group The Black Sheep Band.

The band's members included Jake Burns, Eric Spicer of Naked Raygun, three members of The Methadones (Dan Vapid, Mike Byrne and Sensitive Pete) and several others. Three original songs and one cover song are included on this 12" EP, which is a charity project to benefit Children's Memorial Hospital in Chicago Illinois.

== Track List ==
- I Could Be Into You, If You Were Into Me 2:29

Words and Music By Dan Vapid, Methadones Music ASCAP

- Black Sheep 3:08

Words and Music By The Black Sheep Band, Black Sheep Band Music ASCAP

- Tell Me I'm The One 1:50

Words and Music By Gina Knapik & Dan Knapik, The Insane Have Always Loved Me ASCAP & Gorehound Music ASCAP

- Love Song 2:19

Words and Music By Algy Ward, Rat Scabies, Captain Sensible, Dave Vanian, Ace Records Ltd/Roudrunner Records and Music Publishing
