= The Methadones (album) =

Studio album by The Methadones
- Released: 2010
- Recorded: 2008–2010
- Genre: Punk rock, pop punk
- Label: Asian Man

The Methadones chronology
The Methadones/The Copyrights Split (2008)	The Methadones (2010)

The Methadones is the last album by punk rock band The Methadones. It was released on November 16, 2010, by Asian Man Records. The album contains five new songs, six songs from The Methadones/The Copyrights Split with the remaining songs coming from out of print singles.

== Track listing ==
1. "Murmurs in the Dark" – 2:39
2. "Undecided" – 2:40
3. "Arial" – 3:24
4. "April Rain" – 3:42
5. "Self Destruct" – 3:44
6. "3-2-1" – 1:20
7. "Imperfect World" – 1:25
8. "Under The Skyline" – 1:58
9. "On The Clock" – 1:58
10. "Easter Island" – 3:44
11. "What Do You Believe In?" – 2:23
12. "Showing Me The Way" – 3:02
13. "Gary Glitter" – 3:37
14. "Over The Moon" – 2:41
15. "I Believe" – 2:28
16. "Exit 17" – 2:34
- Tracks 6–11 are from The Methadones/The Copyrights Split EP.
- Track 12 is an outtake from the This Won't Hurt... session.
- Tracks 13 and 14 are from the "Gary Glitter" single.
- Tracks 15 and 16 are from the "Exit 17" single.

== Personnel ==
- Dan Vapid – guitar, vocals
- Mike Byrne — guitar, vocals
- Sensitive Pete – bass, vocals
- Mike Soucy – drums
