= The Fighters (band) =

American pop-punk band

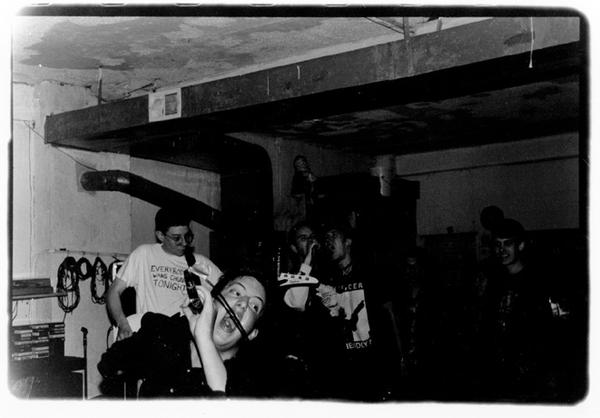

Background information
- Also known as: Thermonocularous
- Origin: Chicago, Illinois, U.S.
- Genres: Pop punk; hardcore punk; punk rock; melodic hardcore
- Years active: 1993–1995, 2001, 2005
- Label: Rocco Records
- Past members: Jason Mojica; Paul Koob; CJ Heimberger; Jim Milak; Mike McKee; Don Shrader

The Fighters were an American pop-punk band from Chicago and part of the punk rock subculture of the Midwestern United States in the early 1990s. Formed in 1993, the band's style included guitar-driven, energetic punk with gang vocals and humorous lyrics. They embraced the DIY ethic in recording and releasing records on lead-singer Jason Mojica's Rocco Records label, booking their own tours, and organizing punk rock shows in non-traditional venues such as laundromats. Members of The Fighters were involved in creating the third edition of the Maximumrocknroll DIY resource guide, Book Your Own Fuckin' Life, and were active participants in the Underdog Records collective, which helped distribute Chicago-area punk music around the world.

After disbanding in 1995, guitarist Paul Koob went on to play with well-known indie rock band Joan of Arc before becoming a graphic designer, and lead singer Jason Mojica joined ska-punk / power-pop band The Eclectics before starting a career as a journalist and filmmaker.

== History ==
The Fighters was formed in 1993 by Jason Mojica, Paul Koob, Mike McKee, and Don Shrader. The four had met while attending St. Joseph High School in Westchester, Illinois, where they collaborated on self-published comic books and zines under the monikers Rocco Comics, and Rocco Publishing. The world of small-press comics and zines that was cataloged at the time by Factsheet Five also served as the gateway for the group to other subcultures, including DIY punk rock. The four decided to form The Fighters halfway into their first school year, and used available technology to help with long-distance songwriting: "Mojica would call up Koob and hum a melody, Koob would process the murmuring into a guitar riff and the two would have a jam session over the phone" reported the Daily Egyptian. Within their first month of forming, The Fighters had their first in-person practice session and recorded and released their first 7-inch EP, Give 'em the Business–the first release under the spinoff Rocco Records imprint Give 'em the Business received a positive review from Maximum Rocknroll founder Tim Yohannan. Yohannan would later entrust the third edition of the DIY resource guide Book Your Own Fuckin' Life to Mojica and the Rocco team, which featured The Fighters. Mojica and Yohannan bonded over an earnest love for the punk scene and its DIY ethos "What drives so many people to work their asses off to the extent of becoming total maniacs in this wacky world we call punk?" Mojica was quoted as saying in Underground: The Subterranean Culture of DIY Punk Shows. "Satisfaction, belonging, 'fame', the desire to escape ordinary life, and just plain fun are a few of the reasons," he continues, "but it all comes down to love."

The band played around Chicago and the midwest in the summer of 1993. When the group gained popularity, Mojica decided to drop out of school to devote more time to the band and the record label, while Shrader left the band and returned to SIU. The Fighters found a new drummer in 16-year-old C.J. Heimberger, whose speed, energy, and humor changed the direction of the band's music, as evidenced on The Fighters' second EP, 1994's Breaking Bones for Laughs.

As punk music grew it's mainstream popularity in the mid-90s due to the success of bands like Green Day and The Offspring, The Fighters–who had previously only played basements and other DIY venues–began being offered shows at larger, more established venues like Metro Chicago, leading to some controversy in the scene. As Brian Czarnik, drummer of Chicago punk band The Bollweevils, explains in his book, Just Words, "This venue was viewed as the establishment... and had a history of not really caring about the local punk scene. The Metro's first punk show in more than a decade was to be headlined by The Bollweevils, along with Propaghandi, 88 Fingers Louie, and The Fighters. Propagandhi, however, backed out at the last minute, citing concerns with what they perceived as the Metro's corporate sponsors. The Fighters played one other show at Metro, primarily staying to their basement-show DIY roots.

The Fighters were inducted into the annals of Chicago punk history in the summer of 1994 when they performed live on WZRD, becoming part of the station's taped archives alongside the Effigies, Naked Raygun, and others. The Fighters were also a favorite band of The Don and Dave Show on Northwestern University's WNUR.

The Fighters toured the U.S. twice, and recorded a total of 16 songs released on 7-inch EPs and various punk complications before breaking up in May, 1995 with a farewell show was a sold-out performance at The Fireside Bowl.

== Studio recordings ==
The Fighters' first two studio recordings were produced by Chuck Uchida of Chicago punk legends The Defoliants at his Attica Studios in Chicago, Illinois. The remainder of the band's recordings were made at Sonic Iguana in Lafayette, Indiana and were produced by Mass Giorgini of Rattail Grenadier, and Jeff Hansel.

== Indie comics connections ==
- The cover art for The Fighters' second EP, Breaking Bones for Laughs was done by small press comics legend, Matt Feazell and features his iconic characters The Amazing Cynicalman and Antisocialman. Mojica has publicly stated that Feazell is responsible for introducing him to small press publishing and ultimately to punk rock.
- Breaking Bones for Laughs also featured a comic adaptation of the lyrics to the song The Flying Father by The Fighters' guitarist, Paul Koob, who is the artist and creator of the Hamster Man comic series.
- Indie comics artist Terry LaBan did the cover art for The Fighters split 7-inch EP with Winepress, The Rambling Boys of Pleasure
- The Fighters song Fat Boy is reportedly about a staff member of The Comics Journal, published by Fantagraphics Books.

== Reunions ==
The Fighters reunited for the first time in January 2001 for a reunion show at The Cubby Bear, also featuring Sludgeworth, Oblivion, and Gear. It was the venue's first punk show since 1988. The group reunited for a second time in December 2005 for a show at Darkroom, in Chicago.

== Band members ==
- Jason Mojica - Lead vocals (1993–1995, 2001, 2005)
- Paul Koob - Guitar, backup vocals (1993–1995, 2001, 2005)
- Mike McKee - Bass guitar, backup vocals (1993–1995, 2001)
- C.J. Heimberger - Drums (1994–1995, 2001, 2005)
- Jim Milak - Bass guitar (1994–1995, 2001, 2005)
- Don Shrader - Drums (1993)

== Discography ==
=== EPs ===
- Give 'em the Business (Rocco Records, 1993)
- Breaking Bones for Laughs (Rocco Records, 1994)
- The Rambling Boys of Pleasure (with Winepress) (Rocco Records, 1994)
- Motor Man (Rocco Records, 1995)

=== Compilation appearances ===
- A Very Punk Christmas - "The Night Before Christmas" (Rocco Records, 1993)
- Ground Rule Double - "The Evil Man & The Nice Boy" (Divot / ActionBoy 300 Records, 1996)
- Dad, Are We Punk Yet? - "Dance Like a Fool" (Harmless Records, 1995)
- Teenage Kicks - "Home is Where the Heart Is" (Custodial Records, 1995)
