= Sitting Army =

Studio album by Cobra Skulls
- Released: July 10, 2007
- Recorded: Pus Cavern
- Genre: Punk rock
- Length: 29:53
- Label: Red Scare Industries

Cobra Skulls chronology
Draw Muhammad (2006)	Sitting Army (2007)	American Rubicon (2009)

Professional ratings
Review scores
Source	Rating
Punknews.org	link

Sitting Army is the first full-length studio release by American punk rock band Cobra Skulls. It was released by Red Scare Industries on July 10, 2007.

== Track listing ==
All songs written by Cobra Skulls.

1. "Cobra Skullifornia" - 3:05
2. "Faith Is A Cobra" - 3:02
3. "The Cobra and the Man-Whore" - 2:12
4. "Don't Count Your Cobras Before They Hatch" - 1:41
5. "Charming the Cobra" - 3:16
6. "Use Your Cobra Skulls" - 1:45
7. "I'll Always Be A Cobra Skull (Folk Off!)" - 1:48
8. "Anybody Scene My Cobra?" - 1:44
9. "Cobra Skulls Lockdown" - 2:27
10. "¡Hasta Los Cobra Skulls Siempre!" - 1:42
11. "Cobra Skulls Graveyard" - 1:44
12. "Cobra Skulls Jukebox" - 2:18
13. "Cobracoustic" - 2:48

== Personnel ==
- Chad Cleveland - Drums
- Devin Peralta - Bass, Vocals, Music, Lyrics, album art
- Charlie Parker - Guitar
- Joe Johnston - Engineer
- Eric Broyhill - Mastering
- Dusty Hartman - Photos
- Bill Nutt - Art Direction, Layout
