= Direct Hit! =

American punk rock band

- Origin: Milwaukee, Wisconsin, United States
- Genre: punk rock
- Years active: 2007–present
- Labels: Fat Wreck Chords, Red Scare Industries
- Spinoff of: The Box Social
- Members: Nick Woods; Devon Kay; Logan Stang; Joram Zbichorski
- Past members: Maura Weaver; Steve Maury; Danny Walkowiak; Robbie Schroeder; Mike Esser; Alex Hill; Jackson Fothergill; Peter Woods; Kyle Stembaugh; Kyle Motor; Layne Knutson; Chris Gandolfo; Jake Witter; Andy Roemer; Brian Peoplis; Andrew Kloman

Direct Hit! is a Milwaukee-based punk rock band formed in 2007 by singer/guitarist Nick Woods. Its current lineup consists of Nick Woods, Devon Kay, Joram Zbichorski, and Logan Stang.

== History ==
In 2007, while playing with indie rock group The Box Social, Nick Woods had the idea to start a pop punk band that would release music "like comic books," favoring the rapid and consistent release of short EPs over the slow and sporadic traditional approach of full-length records. From 2008 to 2010, Direct Hit! released a series of five EPs for free online in addition to a split 7-inch with the band Mixtapes before signing to Kind of Like Records.

In 2011, Direct Hit! released Domesplitter, their debut full-length which collected ten re-recorded fan favorites from their previous releases.

From 2011 to 2013, the band released five more splits before returning to the studio to record their second full-length record, a concept album titled Brainless God, released by Red Scare Industries. Described as a document of "the final days of a world staring down total nuclear Armageddon," the album follows a serial killer and his would-be victim as the two escape a Satanic cult while trying to find truth and redemption before Armageddon. Bass tracks on the album were recorded with studio musicians Mike Kennerty and Peter J. Woods, as bassist Robbie Schroeder was not replaced by Steve Maury until after Brainless God was recorded. The album was featured on Punk News's "Top 20 Records of the Year" list, where it was called "a finely tuned blast of tooth-melting punk rock goodness." Alternative Press gave the album four out of five stars and described it as "just one great punk-rock song after the next."

In cooperation with Red Scare Industries, Good Land Records, and Wall of Youth, Direct Hit! produced an album-length short film in conjunction with the record. The film was released in chapters across a number of news and media sites including Vice and The A.V. Club.

In February 2014, Direct Hit! was featured as one of the "Top Ten Wisconsin Bands To Watch" by the Milwaukee Journal Sentinel. In September 2014, Nick Woods was a guest on the television show Last Call with Carson Daly, where he was interviewed about Direct Hit!. In November 2014, Woods wrote an article for Vice's Noisey, detailing how Direct Hit! consistently tours without losing money.

Direct Hit! have performed at venues such as The Knitting Factory, Bottom of the Hill, Webster Hall, Asbury Lanes, First Unitarian Church of Philadelphia, and festivals such as Riot Fest, The Fest, Pouzza Fest, Summerfest, Insub Fest, and D4th of July.

They have toured with or opened for bands such as Blink-182, NOFX, Rise Against, A Wilhelm Scream, Dillinger Four, Good Riddance, The Suicide Machines, Off With Their Heads, The Flatliners, Pears, Mixtapes, Cheap Girls, Red City Radio, Masked Intruder, Smoking Popes and Guerilla Poubelle.

In March 2016, the band announced they had signed to Fat Wreck Chords, and their first studio album with the label, Wasted Mind, was released on June 24 of the same year.

After releasing its second LP with Fat Wreck in 2018, Crown of Nothing, Steve Maury and Danny Walkowiak parted with the band, with long-time fill-in drummer Logan Stang taking over for Walkowiak while Direct Hit returned to a rotating group of bass players, including Joram Zbichorski, Josh Goldman, and Jake Levinson. Joram Zbichorski, also a member of Devon Kay's other project Devon Kay & The Solutions, became the band's full time bass player in late 2019.

== Members ==
=== Current ===
- Nick Woods – vocals, guitar (2007–present)
- Devon Kay – guitar, backing vocals (2011–present)
- Logan Stang - drums (2019–present)
- Joram Zbichorski - bass, backing vocals (2019–present)

=== Former ===
- Maura Weaver - guitar, backing vocals (2020–2024)
- Danny Walkowiak – drums (2009–2019)
- Steve Maury – bass, backing vocals (2013–2019)
- Robbie Schroeder – bass (2010–2013)
- Mike Esser – guitar (2010–2011)
- Alex Hill – keyboards (2010)
- Jackson Fothergill
- Peter Woods
- Kyle Stembaugh
- Kyle Motor
- Layne Knutson
- Chris Gandolfo
- Jake Witter
- Andy Roemer
- Brian Peoplis
- Andrew Kloman
- Sarah Woods

== Discography ==
=== Studio albums ===
- Domesplitter (2011, re-released in 2017)
- Brainless God (2013)
- More of the Same (2015)
- Wasted Mind (2016)
- Crown of Nothing (2018)

=== EPs ===
- #1 (2008)
- #2 (2009)
- #3 (2009)
- #4 (2010)
- #5 (2010)
- Split with Mixtapes (2010)
- Split with Tit Patrol (2011)
- Split with Jetty Boys (2011)
- Split with Hold Tight (2012)
- Split with The Haverchucks (2012)
- Split with Braver (2012)
- Split with The Priceduifkes (2014)
- Making a Midwesterner (with The Brokedowns) (2016)
- Human Movement (with PEARS) (2017)
- Local Coverage 2K19 (2019)
- Christmas at Ground Zero (2021)
- Beacon 1 (with Decent Criminal) (2023)
- ONE ONE ZERO (Single b/w MxPx - ONE ZERO ZERO) (2024)

=== Compilation appearances ===
- Red Scare Industries: 10 Years of Your Dumb Bullshit (Red Scare Industries); "Bad Trip on Holy Ghost!" (2014)
