= Resister =

Resister may refer to:

- somebody who resists, like a war, tax, or draft resister
- Resister (album), an album by The Decline
- Resister (song), a song by Japanese singer ASCA

== See also ==
- Resistor, a common electronic component
