= Dan Vapid and the Cheats =

American Band

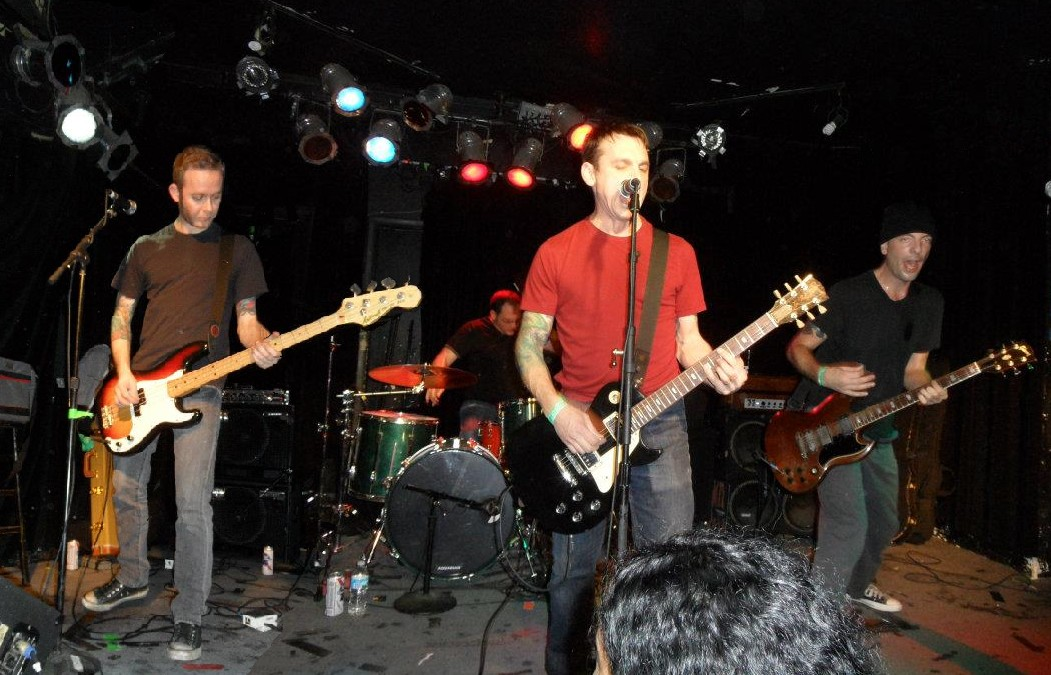
- In Chicago, 2012

Background information
- Origin: Chicago, Illinois
- Genres: Punk rock; pop punk; power pop
- Years active: 2011-present
- Members: Dan Vapid; Simon Lamb; Dillon Dunnagan; Gabe Usery
- Past members: Mike Byrne; Rick Uncapher; Mike Soucy
- Website: bandcamp

Dan Vapid and the Cheats are a pop punk band from Chicago that features former members of Screeching Weasel, The Riverdales, The Methadones, Noise By Numbers, The Vindictives, Sludgeworth and The Bomb.

== History ==
Following the demise of Screeching Weasel after the SXSW debacle, Schafer formed a new band called Dan Vapid and the Cheats featuring bassist Simon Lamb (Screeching Weasel, Riverdales), guitarist Mike Byrne (Methadones, Vindictives) and drummer Mike Soucy (Methadones, The Bomb). The band was originally intended to be a one-off project that would play songs from throughout Vapid's career at a concert to be held over the Memorial Day weekend of 2011, the same weekend that Screeching Weasel was meant to play if they had not disbanded. However, following the concert Vapid decided to keep the band as an ongoing entity. They recorded their debut album in October 2011, with Justin Perkins producing, at the Mystery Room.

Mike Byrne left the band before their appearance at Riot Fest in September, 2012 when the band performed as a trio. In January, 2013 a new line-up was introduced with Simon Lamb moving over to guitar and Rick Uncapher (Noise By Numbers, Textbook, Woolworthy) joining on bass. The band's second album, entitled Two was released in July 2013.

Rick Uncapher and Mike Soucy were replaced by Dillon Dunnagan and Gabe Usery by the time the band released its third album Three in March 2019. The band released its fourth album Escape Velocity in November 2021.

== Band members ==
- Dan Vapid: Lead Vocals/guitar
- Simon Lamb: Guitar/Vocals (formerly bass/vocals)
- Dillon Dunnagan: (bass/vocals)
- Gabe Usery: (drums/vocals)

Former Members:

- Mike Byrne: guitar
- Rick Uncapher: Bass
- Mike Soucy: Drums

== Discography ==
=== Singles ===
- Dan Vapid and The Cheats / Jetty Boys (split 7-inch, 2012 - Merman Records)
- Dan Vapid and The Cheats / Masked Intruder (The Wedding 7-inch, 2013 - Solidarity Recordings)

=== Albums ===
- Dan Vapid and the Cheats (Torture Chamber, 2012)
- Two (Torture Chamber, 2013)
- Three (Eccentric Pop, 2019)
- Escape Velocity (Eccentric Pop, 2021)
- Welcome To Dystopia (Eccentric Pop, 2022)

== Reception ==
- "they bobbed their way through about a thousand concise, hook-loaded power-chord jams" (Kevin Warwick, Chicago Reader, 2012)
- "Vapid's affinity for writing solid, catchy tunes is at the forefront of this record. Even though there are a lot of comparisons to previous bands, there is a unique sound here that has a little something that those other bands didn't have. The songs have a kind of timeless quality, which I think is a testament to Vapid's ability to craft really great songs." (Punknews.org)
- "Regardless of what particular style of punk or pop Vapid is playing throughout the record, one thing is clear: he is enjoying himself. It is the most confident-sounding record Vapid has ever released. With The Cheats, Vapid has come into his own." (Moria Dailey, ChicagoMusic.org, 2012)
