= Uncapher =

Uncapher is a surname. Notable people with the surname include:

- Keith Uncapher (1922–2002), American computer engineer and manager
- Rick Uncapher (born 1970), American bass player
