= Jason Mojica =

American journalist

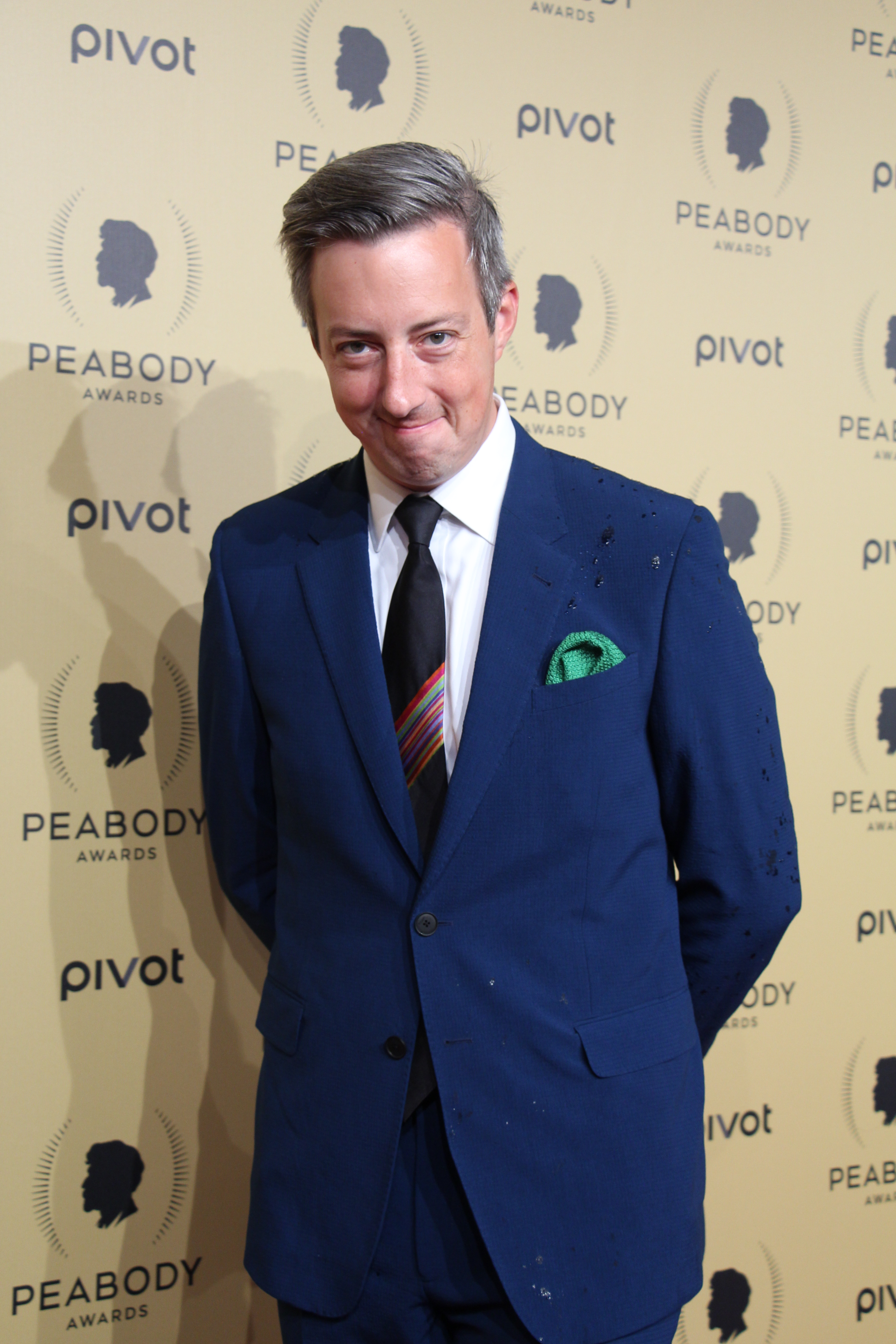
- Born: 1974 (age 51–52); Cicero, Illinois, U.S.
- Education: George Washington University (BA)
- Known for: Founding Editor of VICE News, member of The Fighters

Jason Mojica (born 1974) is an American journalist, film producer, and musician. He is the co-founder and treasurer of IXNAY PAC, a super PAC devoted to "getting Donald Trump and his cronies out of office." Previously, he was the founding editor-in-chief of VICE News, and in 2013 became one of the first Americans to meet Kim Jong Un when he led the team that brought Dennis Rodman and the Harlem Globetrotters to North Korea. In November 2017, Vice Media fired Mojica after allegations made by several women that he had sexually harassed them surfaced.

== Early life and education ==
Jason Mojica was born in Cicero, Illinois, in 1974. He attended Southern Illinois University in Carbondale for one year before dropping out, although he later earned a degree in Political Communication from George Washington University in Washington, D.C. at the age of 34. After commencing his studies, however, Mojica explained that he never felt part of the university community: "I'm a 31-year-old male. Do you really want me living in a dorm?" Mojica said in offering an "awkward explanation" as to why he had decided to live off-campus. Mojica further described himself during his time in college as "'that grumpy man' who doesn't want students to distract others trying to learn."

Mojica had originally dropped out of college to become the front man of The Fighters, a punk rock band he formed with high school friends. Mojica also began his own indie record label, Rocco Records, and opened his own coffee house, Jinx Cafe, and bought a video rental store. He explained that the decision to return to college was an "attempt to think inside the box and learn how to write a business letter."

In 2006, Mojica and two friends crowdfunded, produced and directed the documentary Christmas in Darfur? with their company, 77 International. It was one of the first feature-length documentaries to be distributed online for free.

In 2009, Mojica became a producer and correspondent for The Listening Post, a weekly media review and analysis program airing on Al Jazeera English.

== Career ==
=== Rocco Entertainment Group ===
While he was a sophomore in high-school, Mojica started a small press that initially published photocopied minicomics, but later grew into a magazine publisher and record label. The company was active from 1989 to 1999.

==== Rocco Comics ====
In 1989, at the age of 15, Mojica started publishing comic books written and drawn by him and his friends under the moniker Rocco Comics. The comics were predominantly in the minicomic format and printed in runs of 100 to 500. Titles included Hamster Man, Mundane Tales, and Hey Shakey Jake, Are You Out of Your Fuckin’ Crazy!?. Over time the circle of contributors grew to include such established underground and indie cartoonists Jay Lynch, Grass Green, Terry Laban, Carole Sobocinski, Matt Feazell, Reed Waller, and Jim Siergy.

==== Rocco Publishing ====
In 1992, while attending Southern Illinois University, Mojica started to expand Rocco's scope beyond comics with the publication of pop culture-oriented zine called No Shirt, No Shoes, No Service. In 1994, Mojica organized a team of volunteers to compile info about DIY punk bands, venues, record labels, and zines when Rocco Publishing teamed up with Maximum Rocknroll to publish the third edition of resource guide Book Your Own Fuckin’ Life, which has been called “the DIY publication that kept bands on the road for decades". The premiere of Shake! spoofed Playboy’s iconic first issue, swapping Marilyn Monroe for Hugh Hefner on the cover and the centerfold. Mojica’s accompanying story about the Playboy empire was less-than-flattering, so when someone at the company got a hold of it and sent it to Hefner, Mojica was “sure he would either sue us or try to destroy us." Instead, the Chicago Reader reported, “Hefner loved it, despite the references to dogs and dexies, and wanted ten more copies.”

==== Rocco Records ====
In 1993, Mojica launched the midwest-centric punk rock record label, Rocco Records. The label, which predominantly released 7” vinyl EPs, released records by 88 Fingers Louie, The Bollweevils, The Mushuganas, Apocalypse Hoboken, Cap’n Jazz, The Parasites, The Volatiles, Winepress, and Mojica's own band, The Fighters.

=== VICE Media ===
Mojica joined VICE Media in 2011, and contributed segments for "The Vice Guide to Everything," which Mojica described as "60 Minutes meets Jackass.... Hard hitting international news meets damaged genitals." He later produced online "tentpole" documentaries, including two Webby Award-winning films: The Vice Guide to Congo and The Rebels of Libya.

==== "Basketball diplomacy" in North Korea ====
In March 2013, Mojica became one of the first Americans to meet reclusive North Korean leader Kim Jong-un. Mojica and Vice Media co-founder Shane Smith are said to have had the idea of gaining access to film in North Korea by appealing to Kim's reported love of basketball by proposing "a goodwill game of basketball with North Korea's national team." The Vice crew brought with them 5-time NBA Champion Dennis Rodman and three members of the Harlem Globetrotters. The New York Times media critic David Carr wrote at the time: "Vice gained a share of infamy by getting access to the North Korean leader Kim Jong-un and the notoriously secretive country he leads through a caper involving Dennis Rodman and the Harlem Globetrotters, a stunt that drew attention, invective and clicks."

According to a later article in The New Yorker, the "cheerful scene—billed as 'basketball diplomacy'—was soon complicated by developments in U.S.–North Korean relations." After Rodman's visit, North Korea... scrapped its 1953 armistice with South Korea and threatened a preemptive nuclear attack on the United States.... What had seemed like a bold P.R. stunt by Vice now looked like cozying up to a dangerous dictator." At one point Rodman stood up at the banquet and told Kim, "Sir, you have a friend for life." The New Yorker went on to say that in the context of "recent reports of cannibalism among a starving population, those remarks and current headline on the Vice Web site that ‘North Korea has a friend in Dennis Rodman and Vice’ seem a bit, well, tasteless.” Mojica has called such criticism "sanctimonious."

While in Pyongyang, Mojica and the other members of the Vice crew attended a lavish dinner hosted by Kim. "It was the most surreal experience of my life," Mojica said. "Um... so Kim Jong Un just got the #VICEonHBO crew wasted... no really, that happened," Mojica later tweeted. The piece's on-air correspondent Ryan Duffy told the Associated Press, "Dinner was an epic feast. Felt like about 10 courses in total. I'd say the winners were the smoked turkey and sushi, though we had the Pyongyang cold noodles earlier in the trip and that's been the runaway favorite so far." Mojica, Duffy, and the others were criticized on social media and on news sites for their tweets and comments praising the celebration, in lieu of the fact that millions of North Koreans have died of starvation. The website Gawker intermingled Mojica's tweets with images of starving infants and children on the verge of death. New York magazine commented: "Aside from the brutal slave-labor camps, the routine rape and torture of political prisoners, mass starvation extreme enough to induce episodes of cannibalism... North Korea sounds like a blast!" Shane Smith complained that a State Department official reprimanded him, saying: "We would have hoped they would have taken the food from the banquet and given it to the starving people."

The trip was severely criticized by the Obama administration, leading White House press secretary Jay Carney to say that, "Instead of spending money on celebrity sporting events to entertain the elites of that country, the North Korean regime should focus on the well-being of its own people who have been starved, imprisoned, and denied their human rights." A State Department spokesperson said: "Clearly you've got the regime spending money to wine and dine foreign visitors, when they should be feeding their own people."

==== Launch of VICE News ====
After the first season of the Vice show on HBO, Mojica became the founding Editor-in-Chief and Executive Producer of the company's stand-alone digital news platform, Vice News. The site launched in March 2014 with coverage of the conflict and unrest in Afghanistan Crimea, Gaza, Kyrgyzstan, South Sudan, and Venezuela. One media critic noted that "the trailer for the forthcoming news channel gives a clear look at what Vice is interested in: unrest, conflict, revolution, persecution."

In August 2014, Vice News became the first news organization to embed with the Islamic State. The resulting documentary, The Islamic State, received worldwide news coverage, has been viewed more than 13 million times online, and won a 2014 Peabody Award and a National Magazine Award.

Such work led the New York Times then-media critic David Carr, who had previously been severely critical of Vice, to write: "Being the crusty old-media scold felt good at the time, but recent events suggest that Vice is deadly serious about doing real news that people, yes, even young people, will actually watch." Carr wrote of the ISIS documentary in particular, "The ISIS story scans as both propaganda and remarkable journalism, some of it filmed in Syria, the most dangerous place in the world to be a reporter right now." More broadly, Carr wrote, he was "glad that someone's willing to do the important work of bearing witness, the kind that can get you killed if something goes wrong."

Others were more critical, with some suggesting that in making the film about the Islamic state, Vice had colluded with a terrorist organization; lending legitimacy to those allegations was that Vice refused to disclose the conditions it had agreed to get permission from ISIS to film the group. At a panel discussion at NYU, Mojica said, "I can certainly say that there is no collusion between Vice News and the Islamic State as much as there is a bit of sparring and each of us probably trying to get something different out of [the experience]... [B]ut that was a very unique case and it comes with, of course, conditions in order to get in and get out with your life. You understand you're operating under a very peculiar set of rules." Notably, "Mojica declined to elaborate when asked what 'conditions,' specifically, were agreed upon with the militants," according to a report in The Huffington Post. Kevin Sutcliffe, who headed Vice's programming in Europe, told The Huffington Post that its filmmakers "hadn't been able to travel freely during his reporting trip inside Syria and [were] always accompanied by a minder from the Islamic State."

==== Allegations of sexual harassment and termination by Vice ====
In November 2017, Vice Media formally suspended Mojica pending an investigation of allegations into sexual harassment made against him by several past and current employees. The following month, Mojica was terminated after an internal company investigation. The company said in a memo sent to employees: "Vice Media fired three employees for behavior ranging from verbal and sexual harassment to other behavior that is inconsistent with our policies, our values, and the way in which we believe colleagues should work together."

That internal corporate investigation was prompted by investigative stories in The New York Times and The Daily Beast examining allegations of sexual harassment regarding several senior male executives in the company.

The Times reported at the time: "An investigation by The New York Times has found four settlements involving allegations of sexual harassment or defamation against Vice employees, including its current president. In addition, more than two dozen other women, most in their 20s and early 30s, said they had experienced or witnessed sexual misconduct at the company — unwanted kisses, groping, lewd remarks and propositions for sex. The settlements and the many episodes of harassment the women described depict a top-down ethos of male entitlement at Vice, where women said they felt like just another party favor at an organization where partying often was an extension of the job."

Several women specifically accused Mojica of such misconduct. The Times' expose reported, for example, that "Abby Ellis, a former Vice journalist, said that in 2013 Mr. Mojica... tried to kiss her against her will. She said that she yelled at him and hit him with an umbrella multiple times. She said that she faced other unwanted advances from Mr. Mojica after the incident. Ms. Ellis said that after the episode she felt that their relationship soured and that she was missing out on newsroom opportunities." Mojica responded by saying that he had been "misreading a moment" by "foolishly trying to kiss Abby." Mojica further told the newspaper, “I was quickly rebuffed, and I immediately apologized.”

A second woman employed by Vice, Helen Donahue, alleged that Mojica had "grabbed her breasts and buttocks at a company holiday party", the Times reported. Mojica said that he did not "remember doing anything of the sort."

The Times also reported that Vice had earlier settled a potential lawsuit "for an unknown amount" of money with Martina Veltroni, a former employee, who alleged that while he was her supervisor, Mojica "retaliated against her after they had a sexual relationship" and later "derailed her career at Vice." Attorneys for Vice originally denied the allegations against Mojica, claiming that Veltroni was attempting to “recast her consensual and desired sexual relationship with her former supervisor” into a false claim of harassment, before reversing course and settling the matter before it would ever reach court. Mojica himself admitted the sexual relationship with a subordinate, but denied that he ever "retaliated against" Veltroni.

Several other women came forward to allege that Mojica, as their supervisor, dismissed their claims of sexual harassment by other men in the company, and were told they had to tolerate such behavior to keep their own jobs. A former Vice associate producer, Phoebe Barghouty, told The Daily Beast, that after she complained to Mojica about incidents of sexual harassment by other men in the company directed against her, Mojica told her: "The thing about working in this industry, is that we have people going into war zones and the only people willing to do that are sociopaths. And you just have to deal with that because that's the only kind of person who can get that story." Mojica responded by making the claim that Barghouty's recollection was incorrect and inconsistent with his attitudes.

=== IXNAY PAC ===
In August 2018, Mojica, with Trace Crutchfield, co-founded IXNAY PAC, an independent expenditures-only anti-Trump political action committee." During the 2020 United States presidential election, IXNAY launched a podcast produced by Mojica and hosted by Crutchfield. Guests have included former Trump administration official Anthony Scaramucci, former member of the Weather Underground Bill Ayers, and Dead Kennedys frontman Jello Biafra.

According to documents filed with the FEC, Mojica serves as the PAC's treasurer. As of the committee's pre-general election filing in October of 2020, the PAC had raised just over $10,000.

== Filmography ==
2018: Shelter (Executive Producer)

2017: Jim & Andy: The Great Beyond (Co-Executive Producer)

2017: A World in Disarray (Executive Producer)

2014: The Islamic State (Executive Producer)

2014: Last Chance High (Executive Producer)

2013: The Hermit Kingdom (Producer)

2012: Bride Kidnapping in Kyrgyzstan (Producer)

2011: North Korean Labor Camps (Producer)

2011: The VICE Guide to Congo (Producer)

2008: Christmas in Darfur? (Producer and Director)

== Awards and nominations ==
2016: Alfred I. duPont-Columbia University Awards – Selfie Soldiers

2016: National Magazine Award – Selfie Soldiers

2015: National Magazine Award – The Islamic State

2015; News & Documentary Emmy Award (Nominee, Outstanding Coverage of a Breaking News Story in a News Magazine) - Russian Roulette, The Invasion of Ukraine

2015; News & Documentary Emmy Award (Nominee, Outstanding Coverage of a Breaking News Story in a News Magazine) - Outstanding Interview, "The Architect"

2014: Peabody Award – Last Chance High

2014: Peabody Award – The Islamic State

2014: IDA Award (Nominee, Best Short Form Series) – Last Chance High

2014: IDA Award (Nominee, Best Short Form Series) – The Islamic State

2013: Webby Award (Online Film & Video: News & Politics, Series) – VICE News

2013: Webby Award, People's Choice (Online Film & Video: News & Politics, Series) – VICE News

2012: Webby Award (Online Film & Video: Documentary, Individual Episode) – The Rebels of Libya

2012: Webby Award (News and Politics: Individual Episode) – The VICE Guide to Congo
