= PEARS =

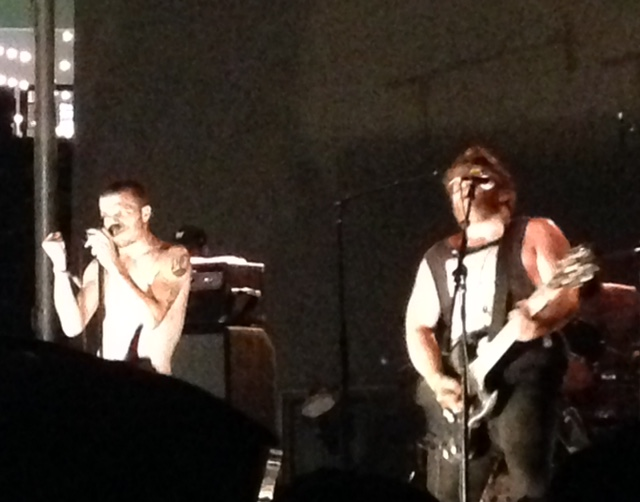
- PEARS live at Riot Fest in Denver, 2015

Background information
- Origin: New Orleans, Louisiana, United States
- Genres: Hardcore punk, punk rock, melodic hardcore
- Years active: 2014-present
- Labels: Fat Wreck Chords, Anxious & Angry, Gunner Records
- Members: Zach Quinn; Brian Pretus; Erich Goodyear; Jarret Nathan
- Past members: John Bourgeois; Tim Harman; Alex Talbot; John Komar; Pat Decline
- Website: www.pearstheband.com

PEARS is an American hardcore punk band formed in 2014 in New Orleans, Louisiana.

== History ==
The band was formed in early 2014 by Zach Quinn and Brian Pretus, a year after the breakup of their previous band The Lollies. Quinn and Pretus enlisted former bandmate Alex Talbot to play bass and friend John Bourgeois as their drummer. The band played their first show on Mardi Gras Day with Epitaph Records band Off With Their Heads, which gained the interest of Ryan Young. After a short run with two drummers Bourgeois (who recorded Go To Prison) and Tim Harman (who went out on their 1st tour), PEARS enrolled Jarret Nathan of the Philadelphia band Push Ups.

PEARS debut album Go To Prison was self-released by the band, and was later released on vinyl through Anxious and Angry records. The band went on United States tours with bands such as Dwarves, Red City Radio, Teenage Bottlerocket, Off With Their Heads, Direct Hit, Lagwagon, and The Suicide Machines; and their first European tour with Red City Radio off the heels of a European release of the record by German punk label Gunner Records

The band is currently signed to Fat Wreck Chords, and released their sophomore album, Green Star, on April 1, 2016. Band members Zach Quinn, Erich Goodyear, and Brian Pretus are also in the band Little Bags.

== Discography ==
=== Studio albums ===
- Go to Prison (2014, Anxious & Angry; 2015 re-release, Fat Wreck Chords)
- Green Star (2016, Fat Wreck Chords)
- Human Movement (2017, Fat Wreck Chords, split album with Direct Hit!)
- Pears (2020, Fat Wreck Chords)

=== EPs ===
- ...In Diapers (2014, self-released)
- Letters to Memaw (2015, Fat Wreck Chords)

== Videography ==
- Forever Sad
- Victim to Be
- Framework
- Breakfast
- Punks in Vegas Sessions
- Green Star

== Members ==
=== Current ===
- Zach Quinn - Vocals
- Brian Pretus - Guitar, Backing vocals
- Erich Goodyear - Bass, Backing vocals
- Jarret Nathan - Drums

=== Past ===
- John Bourgeois - drums
- Tim Harman - drums
- Alex Talbot - bass, backing vocals
- John Komar - bass, backing vocals
- Pat Decline - Bass, backing vocals **
- Hayden Pickford - Bass, backing vocals **
- Chris Aiken (Strung Out) - Bass, Backing Vocals **
- Rob Ramos (Strung Out) - Bass, Backing Vocals **
- David Friedman - Bass, Backing Vocals **

** = Bass players for PEARS / Strung Out Australia/New Zealand tour 2016. These people are referred to as "The Down Under 5", and Pat Decline of The Decline (band) remains an honorary member, as the only member of the PEARS Australian Chapter.
