= American Rubicon =

Studio album by Cobra Skulls
- Released: July 7, 2009 (digital); July 14, 2009
- Recorded: March–April 2009
- Genre: Punk rock
- Label: Red Scare Industries

Cobra Skulls chronology
Sitting Army (2007)	American Rubicon (2009)	Agitations (2011)

Professional ratings
Review scores
Source	Rating
Punknews.org	4.5/5 stars

American Rubicon is the second full-length album from punk rock band Cobra Skulls. It was digitally released by Red Scare Industries on July 7, 2009, with a physical release following one week later on July 14. It is the band's first release with guitarist Adam Beck, who joined the band in 2008 after the departure of Charlie Parker.

The band entered the studio in late March 2009 to record the album. The album was finished and final details were announced on June 15, 2009. The same day, the band posted a new song, titled "H.D.U.I. (Honorary Discharge Under the Influence)", on their Myspace page. The song details frontman Devin Peralta's encounter with an Iraq War veteran who was discharged from the military for intentionally driving under the influence in the desert.

The title of the tenth track, "I Used to Like Them When They Put 'Cobra' in the Titles", is in reference to the band's previous album, Sitting Army, in which every track had the word "cobra" in the title.

== Track listing ==
All tracks are written by Cobra Skulls.

No.	Title	Length
1.	"Time and Pressure"
2.	"There's a Skeleton in My Military Industrial Closet"
3.	"Rebel Fate"	2:52
4.	"Muniphobia"
5.	"Thicker Than Water"
6.	"H.D.U.I. (Honorary Discharge Under the Influence)"	2:34
7.	"Overpopulated"
8.	"Problems With Preconceptions"
9.	"Willful State of Denial"
10.	"I Used to Like Them When They Put 'Cobra' in the Titles"
11.	"Bad Apples"
12.	"Timing"
13.	"Back to the Youth"
14.	"Dead Inside"
15.	"Agree to Disagree"
16.	"One Day I'll Never"
17.	"Exponential Times"

== Personnel ==
- Devin Peralta - vocals, bass
- Adam Beck - guitar
- Chad Cleveland - drums
