= The Decline (band) =

Australian skate punk band

- From left to right: Ray, Pat, Ben, Josh - Photo by Neve Dolin

Background information
- Origin: Perth, Australia
- Genres: Skate punk; Punk rock; Melodic Hardcore; Pop-punk
- Years active: 2005–present
- Labels: Pee Records (Australia) Bearded Punk Records (Europe); Thousand Island Records (North America); Disconnect Disconnect (UK); Bird Attack Records (United States); Bells on Records (Japan); Inya Face Records (Japan); Cargo Records/Finetunes (Europe/UK) Oxford Records (United States)
- Members: Pat Decline; Ben Elliott; Ray Ray; Josh Barker
- Past members: Harry; Dan Cribb; Nathan Cooper; James "Doody" Davies
- Website: www.thedecline.com.au

The Decline are an Australian skate punk band from Perth who formed in 2005. They have been signed to Adelaide punk label Pee Records since 2011 and have released four studio albums and one compilation album. The band's current line-up consists of vocalist/guitarist Pat Decline, vocalist/guitarist Ben Elliott, bassist Ray Ray and drummer Josh Barker.

The Decline are currently distributed internationally by Thousand Island Records (North America), Bearded Punk Records (Europe), Disconnect Disconnect Records (UK) and Milestone Sounds (Japan).

In the past they have been distributed by Bird Attack Records (United States), Oxford Records (United States), Bells On Records (Japan), Inya Face Records (Japan) and Cargo/Finetunes (Europe).

The Decline have toured extensively and have played shows in Australia, Europe and the United Kingdom, The United States, Mexico, Costa Rica, South America and Japan. They have toured with notable bands including Face To Face, Ignite, C.J. Ramone, A Wilhelm Scream, The Flatliners, Teenage Bottlerocket, Useless ID, Versus The World, Implants, Direct Hit, Local Resident Failure, Much The Same, The Fullblast, Belvedere (band) and MakeWar.

== History ==
=== The early years (2005–2010) ===
The Decline were formed in Perth, Western Australia in 2005 by school friends Pat Dolin, Dan Cribb and James Davies. The Decline performed at numerous punk shows in Perth during their formative years, most notably as an opening act for Frenzal Rhomb at Club Capitol in Perth on December 8, 2007. At this time, all of the members of The Decline were underage and lied about their age in order to be able to play the show. Between 2005 and 2008 The Decline were also joined by guitarists John Knowles and then James Bajrovic. In April 2008 Nathan Cooper was added to the lineup and The Decline recorded and independently released their first EP, The Same Kind.

In August 2009, The Decline recorded their debut album "I'm Not Gonna Lie To You" at The Blasting Room in Fort Collins, Colorado, with Bill Stevenson and Jason Livermore. The album was released independently on March 19, 2010, and generated the first Australian tours for the band.

=== I'm Not Gonna Lie To You and Are You Gonna Eat That (2010–2015) ===
In early 2010, James Davies left the band. His final show was supporting No Fun At All and The Flatliners at Amplifier Bar in Perth on March 11, 2010. Davies was replaced by Harry, who first performed with The Decline on the album launch tour for I'm Not Gonna Lie To You in April 2010.

In June and July 2010 The Decline embarked on The Pinkeye Tour with Newcastle Skate Punk band Local Resident Failure. The tour visited South Australia, Victoria and New South Wales and included both urban and rural shows.

In 2011, The Decline signed to Australian punk and hardcore record label Pee Records and recorded and released their next album, "Are You Gonna Eat That?", on September 23, 2011. This album spawned a large touring cycle for the band in Australia, and was followed by their first international tours in 2013 in Europe, and in Japan with Useless ID and Implants.

In November of 2013, The Decline received a nomination for "Punk Act Of The Year" at the West Australian Music Awards.

On March 3, 2014, The Decline appeared at the Soundwave Festival in Perth alongside Less Than Jake and Alkaline Trio. During this performance The Decline announced their upcoming fully crowd-funded EP Can I Borrow A Feeling and debuted new songs Yahweh or the Highway and Cool Kids Can't Die. Can I Borrow A Feeling was released on April 18, 2014, and was supported by a national tour.

=== Resister (2015–2019) ===
On January 5, 2015, bassist and vocalist Dan Cribb announced his and guitarist Nathan Cooper's departure from The Decline. On January 9 of the same year, Pat Decline announced that longtime friends of the band, Ben Elliott and Ray Chiu would be taking over guitar and bass duties respectively, and that The Decline were entering the studio to begin working on their third studio album. Subsequently, The Decline released a new single entitled "Giving Up Is A Gateway Drug" and embarked on a national tour, performing headline shows and as a support act for Local Resident Failure, Guttermouth and Frenzal Rhomb. This was shortly followed by a second single; I Don't Believe which featured guest vocals by Cameron Baines from the Australian punk band Bodyjar.

On June 12, 2015, the band released their third studio album "Resister" through Pee Records. Resister was distributed internationally by Bird Attack Records (United States), Finetunes (Europe) and Bells On Records (Japan). In support of the album, the band went on a worldwide tour. This included appearances at European summer festivals including Punk Rock Holiday, Brakrock EcoFest, KNRD Fest, Dumb & Dumber Fest, Resurrection Fest and Rebellion Fest. The tour also included European club shows supporting Teenage Bottlerocket, a full tour of the United States including an appearance at The Fest in Gainesville, FL, a tour of Japan supporting Useless ID and Versus The World and a Mexican tour supporting A Wilhelm Scream. After which, The Decline were invited to support A Wilhelm Scream in Australia the following May.

In October of 2015, The Decline were nominated for "Best Punk/Hardcore Act" at the West Australian Music Awards.

In March 2016, Pat Decline played bass in PEARS during their Australian tour with Strung Out. In May of 2016, The Decline's single "I Don't Believe" was nominated for "Punk Song of the Year 2015" at the WAM Song of the Year competition.

In July 2016, The Decline embarked on the second touring cycle for their album Resister, visiting Europe and the United Kingdom during summer for festival season and club shows with The Flatliners, or Manchester's Fair Do's. Following this, The Decline toured The United States with MakeWar and the Australian East Coast with Local Resident Failure on The Pinkeye Tour; Round 2.

In October of 2016, The Decline were nominated for "Best Punk/Hardcore Act" at the West Australian Music Awards. In November of 2016, The Decline were featured on a Teenage Bottlerocket tribute album for Brandon Carlisle compiled by Ramone To The Bone Records, covering the song "Can't Quit You".

In May of 2017, The Decline's single "Can't Have Both" was nominated for "Punk Song of the Year 2016" at the WAM Song of the Year competition. "Can't Have Both" was also nominated in the "Metal Song of the Year" and "Pop Song of the Year" categories, however it did not win in any category.

In June 2017, The Decline performed at Jera On Air festival in The Netherlands and supported CJ Ramone throughout Germany and The Netherlands. In August 2017, The Decline and Direct Hit embarked on a co-headlining tour of Australia. After the conclusion of these shows, The Decline commenced a West Coast tour of The United States with San Diego's Caskitt. Jared Stinson of Sic Waiting filled in on bass during these shows.

In October 2017, The Decline played on the We Are One Tour in South America supporting Face To Face, Ignite, The Fullblast and Much The Same. The tour visited Brazil, Argentina, Chile, Peru, Colombia and Costa Rica.

=== Flash Gordon Ramsay Street (2019–2023) ===
Flash Gordon Ramsay Street album cover.

In July 2019, The Decline released a new single entitled Verge Collection which featured guest vocals by Stacey Dee from Bad Cop/Bad Cop. Verge Collection was supported by a national Australian tour during which Josh Barker from The Bob Gordon's filled in on drums for Harry, who had broken his arm and dislocated his shoulder in a mountain biking accident. During this tour, The Decline announced the upcoming release of their fourth studio album, "Flash Gordon Ramsay Street".

Flash Gordon Ramsay Street was released on Pee Records on August 30, 2019, and followed with an Australian tour supported by Nerdlinger that October. Flash Gordon Ramsay Street featured guest vocals by Nuno Pereira from A Wilhelm Scream on the track War. Flash Gordon Ramsay Street was distributed internationally by Bearded Punk Records (EU), Disconnect Disconnect Records (UK) and Thousand Island Records in North America, marking the closure of The Decline's contract with Bird Attack Records in the USA.

Subsequently, The Decline were announced on festivals in Europe and as a support act for Lagwagon for the following summer, however these shows did not go ahead due to the COVID-19 pandemic and were rescheduled for the following years.

In 2020, The Decline re-released their debut album I'm Not Gonna Lie To You on vinyl LP for the first time, and released a split EP with Sic Waiting on 7" vinyl which contained two new songs by each band. In 2021, The Decline re-released their second album Are You Gonna Eat That on a 12" picture disc to celebrate the album's 10th anniversary. In June 2022 at a show supporting Frenzal Rhomb in Perth, The Decline were joined on stage by their ex-guitarist Nathan Cooper, who performed some songs with the band.

In August 2022, The Decline commenced the Flash Gordon Ramsay Street European tour which had been rescheduled in 2020, appearing at summer festivals and as an opening act for Lagwagon, Mad Caddies, Get Dead, Useless ID, Belvedere, Anti-Flag and The Flatliners. This tour included The Decline’s first performance in Scandinavia. During this tour, The Decline played a cover of "The Answer Is Still No" by No Use For A Name each night in honour of the 10th anniversary of Tony Sly's death. A studio recording of this cover was subsequently released on digital streaming services.

On December 23, 2022, The Decline and fellow Pee Records band Nerdlinger both released a Christmas single with identical lyrics. Over the following weeks both bands posted on social media, claiming to be the original author of the lyrics and accusing the other of plagiarism. On January 7, 2023, The Decline posted a cameo video of Australian singer Shannon Noll who encouraged both bands to "shake hands and make up". On January 13, 2023, both The Decline and Nerdlinger posted a photo on Instagram of Pat Decline and Scott McNairn shaking hands and announced that they were "friends again".

In March 2023, The Decline toured the Australian East Coast supporting A Wilhelm Scream and Knife Hands.

=== Magical Misery Tour (2023–present) ===
On July 28, 2023, The Decline announced their upcoming album "Magical Misery Tour" - an 18 song collection featuring all of the band’s non-album singles from 2015-2023. A new single entitled Hillsong of the Damned was also announced, featuring Jay Whalley from Frenzal Rhomb. Magical Misery Tour was released on Pee Records on August 25, and was distributed internationally by Bearded Punk Records, Disconnect Disconnect Records, and Thousand Islands Records.
On November 10 of the same year a music video for The Most Expensive Chips I’ve Ever Had was released, composed of cameos by skate-punk bands around the world.
In May 2024, The Decline supported Canadian skate-punk band Belvedere (band) on their Australian tour.
In February 2025, two of The Decline's songs featured in Invisible Boys - an Australian TV series on Stan (streaming service) based on the novel by Holden Sheppard.
In February 2026, The Decline supported Authority Zero on their Australian tour. During this tour, Dal Failure from Frenzal Rhomb filled in on guitar and vocals.

== Band members ==
=== Current members ===
- Pat Decline – lead vocals, guitar (2005–present)
- Ben Elliott – lead vocals, guitar (2015–present)
- Ray Ray – bass, backing vocals (2015–present)
- Josh Barker – drums (2026–present) (fill-in 2019-2024)

=== Former members ===
- Harry – drums (2010–2026)
- Dan Cribb – lead vocals, bass (2005–2015)
- Nathan Cooper – guitar (2008–2015)
- James "Doody" Davies – drums (2005–2010)

=== Touring musicians ===
- Jared Stinson – bass (2017)
- Kadin Hall – drums (2021)
- Tom Manton – bass (2024)
- Dal Failure – guitar & vocals (2026)
- Joe Rossetto – drums (2026)

=== Studio musicians ===
- Brody Simpson – Drums (2026)

== Influences ==
The Decline have affirmed in interviews that their biggest influences and musical inspiration comes from the melodic, fast style of punk music that they grew up listening to, including other Australian bands such as Frenzal Rhomb and Bodyjar.

== Discography ==
=== Albums ===
- "I'm Not Gonna Lie To You" (2010)
- "Are You Gonna Eat That?" (2011)
- "Resister" (2015)
- "Flash Gordon Ramsay Street" (2019)
- "Magical Misery Tour" (2023)

=== EP's ===
- "The Same Kind" (2008)
- "Can I Borrow A Feeling?" (2014)

=== Split 7-inch EPs ===
- "4 Way WA Punk Split 7"" (2013, with Scalphunter, The Bob Gordons & Silver Lizard)
- "Great Thieves Escape 3" (2016, with Bad Cop Bad Cop, Success & The Bob Ross Effect)
- "Local Resident Failure Vs The Decline" (2017, with Local Resident Failure)
- "Year Of The Crow/Stay Awake" (2020, with Sic Waiting)

=== Singles ===
- "Life Sentence" (2008) ^
- "You Died, Losing 16 Experience Points" (2009) ^
- "Half A Beer" (2010) ^
- "We Lied" (2010) - CD release
- "In The Headlights (It Is Grey)" (2011) ^
- "Excuse Me" (2011) ^
- "Worlds Apart II" (2011) ^
- "Treasure Island Was A Sausage Fest" (2014) ^
- "Giving Up is a Gateway Drug" (2015) ^
- "I Don't Believe" (2015) ^
- "Can't Have Both" (2016) ^
- "Verge Collection" (2019) - CD release
- "The More You Know" (2019) ^
- "Brovine" (2019) ^
- "It Was Always You" (2019) ^
- "War" (2019) ^
- "Fast Food" (2020) ^
- "Kenneth" (2022) ^
- "Absent Mindlessness" (2022) ^
- "The Answer Is Still No" (2022) ^ +
- "The Werewolf Of Fever Swamp" (2022) ^
- "I Never Cared About Christmas..." (2022) ^
- "Hillsong of the Damned" (2023) ^

^Digital release only

+No Use For A Name cover song

== Music videos ==
| Year | Song | Director | Album |
|---|---|---|---|
| 2010 | "Pope'd In The Eye" | Simone Yule & Nathan Cooper | I'm Not Gonna Lie To You |
| 2012 | "Shit Yeah" | Nathan Cooper | Are You Gonna Eat That? (The Decline album) |
| 2012 | "Excuse Me" | Archer Phan | Are You Gonna Eat That? (The Decline album) |
| 2013 | "In The Headlights (It Is Grey)" | Aiden Edwards | Are You Gonna Eat That? (The Decline album) |
| 2014 | "66B" | Nathan Cooper | Are You Gonna Eat That? (The Decline album) |
| 2015 | "Almost Never Met You" | Andre Junior, James Moretta & The Decline | Resister (album) |
| 2016 | "I Don't Believe" | Andre Junior & James Moretta | Resister (album) |
| 2019 | "Verge Collection" | JJ De Ceglie | Flash Gordon Ramsay Street |
| 2019 | "The More You Know" | Ray Ray | Flash Gordon Ramsay Street |
| 2019 | "Brovine" | Mike Foxall of X-Ray Studios | Flash Gordon Ramsay Street |
| 2019 | "It Was Always You" | Chris Thompson of Stryder Sound, Grayson Joines & The Decline | Flash Gordon Ramsay Street |
| 2019 | "War" | Billy Izzard & The Decline | Flash Gordon Ramsay Street |
| 2021 | "Changing My Shoes" - Quarantine Video | Ray Ray & The Decline | Flash Gordon Ramsay Street |
| 2022 | "Smashed Avo" | Ray Ray & The Decline | Flash Gordon Ramsay Street |
| 2023 | "Get Hyrule, Save Zelda" | Grayson Joines & Neve Dolin | Flash Gordon Ramsay Street |
| 2023 | "Hillsong Of The Damned" - Lyric Video | Ray Ray | Magical Misery Tour |
| 2023 | "The Most Expensive Chips I've Ever Had" | Ray Ray | Magical Misery Tour |

== Film and television ==
| Year | Film/Series | Director | Song | Info | Streaming |
|---|---|---|---|---|---|
| 2016 | Can't Win, Do Try | JJ De Ceglie | Almost Never Met You | Independent Film | Amazon, Tubi, Apple TV, Plex |
| 2025 | Invisible Boys | Nicholas Verso | A Crash Course In Emotional English | Based on the novel by Holden Sheppard | Stan (streaming service) |
| 2025 | Invisible Boys | Nicholas Verso | The More You Know | Based on the novel by Holden Sheppard | Stan (streaming service) |

== Awards and nominations ==
=== WAM Awards and WAM Song Of The Year Competition ===
The West Australian Music Awards, or "WAM Awards" are an annual awards night celebrating West Australian music. WAM also hold an annual Song Of The Year awards night.

| Year | Nominee / work | Award | Result | Ref. |
|---|---|---|---|---|
| WAM Awards of 2013 | The Decline | Punk Act Of The Year | Nominated | |
| WAM Awards of 2015 | The Decline | Best Punk/Hardcore Act | Nominated | |
| WAM Song Of The Year Awards - 2016 | I Don’t Believe | Punk Song Of The Year | Nominated | |
| WAM Awards of 2016 | The Decline | Best Punk/Hardcore Act | Nominated | |
| WAM Song Of The Year Awards - 2017 | Can't Have Both | Punk Song Of The Year | Nominated | |
| WAM Song Of The Year Awards - 2017 | Can't Have Both | Pop Song Of The Year | Nominated | |
| WAM Song Of The Year Awards - 2017 | Can't Have Both | Metal Song Of The Year | Nominated | |

== Trivia ==
- The song "Shit Yeah" contains two samples spoken by Comedian and Actor Will Forte on Tim and Eric Awesome Show, Great Job!.
- The Decline have used samples from films Clerks, Dogma and Chasing Amy by director Kevin Smith on their tracks "I'm Not Alright", "Yahweh Or The Highway" and "I Don't Believe"
- The song "Addison" is named after Addison Hall-Butson, the daughter of Ross Butson; The Decline's manager.
