= Death in Venice (disambiguation) =

Death in Venice may refer to:

- Death in Venice, a 1912 novella (Der Tod in Venedig) by German author Thomas Mann
- Death in Venice (film), a 1971 film (Morte a Venezia) by Luchino Visconti starring Dirk Bogarde
- Death In Venice (opera), an opera by Benjamin Britten, first performed in 1973
- Death in Venice, as made into a ballet by John Neumeier, for his Hamburg Ballet company, in December 2003

== See also ==
- Death in Venice Beach, a 2020 album by California punk rock band The Bombpops
