= The Box Social =

American rock band

- Origin: Mequon, Wis., US
- Genres: Alternative rock Pop-rock
- Years active: 2002–2008
- Labels: Bright Ideas; No Karma; Qdot
- Past members: Nick Junkunc; Nick Woods; Dave Griesbach; Brian Peoplis; Mike Ewing; Adam Melberth; Matt Kuehl

The Box Social were an American band from Mequon, Wisconsin, often described as pop rock and sometimes as grunge revival. Critics have compared their sound to Smashing Pumpkins, Franz Ferdinand and Lou Reed, with some songs compared positively to AC/DC and others negatively to Weezer. Critics praised Nick Woods' vocals, noting that he actually sings rather than screaming, and comparing his vocals to Jack White. Woods was later a member of Direct Hit. The band formed in 2002, and released three EPs and one full-length album called Get Going before splitting in 2008.

== Members ==
- Nick Junkunc - guitar/vocals (2002–2008)
- Nick Woods - guitar/vocals (2002–2008)
- Brian Peoplis - drums (2002–2008)
- Dave Griesbach - bass/vocals (2006–2008)
- Adam Melberth - bass (2005–2006)
- Matt Kuehl - bass (2004–2005)
- Mike Ewing - bass (2002–2004)

== Discography ==
- Get Going (2007)
- Blown To Bits (EP, 2005)
- Golly Gee Whiz! (EP, 2004)
- What, Too Soon? (EP, 2003)
