= Ethyline =

American alt rock band from Chicago (1996–2004)

- Origin: Chicago, Illinois, United States
- Genre: Alternative rock
- Years active: 1996–2004
- Label: Wild West/Fluid Recordings
- Spinoff of: Sludgeworth
- Members: Matt Bessemer (vocals); Adam White (guitar); Dave McClean (guitar); Mike Hooten (Strat) (bass); Brian Mcquade (1997-2003); George Rice (2003-2004) (drums)

Ethyline was an American alternative rock band from Chicago, Illinois consisting of Matt Bessemer (vocals), Adam White (guitar), Dave McClean (guitar), Mike Hooten (bass), and Brian Vermin/ George Rice (drums).

The band was formed by members of the band Sludgeworth, but chose a more melodic sound as demonstrated on their debut album, Jitters. Their music reached a European audience by way of the German released compilation album Piranha - Music That Bites! Vol.2 on the record label Virgin. The song 'Wings' was featured on this compilation and the film Masterminds with Patrick Stewart and has since gone some way to leave a legacy for the band. After the release of their debut album Jitters they toured Europe in September 1999 visiting the Netherlands, Germany, Denmark and Sweden.

Their second album Long Gone was released on Wild West/ Fluid Recordings and songs were featured in television episodes of Party of Five, Dawson's Creek, Dangerous Minds, Grosse Pointe, The Sopranos episode Denial, Anger, Acceptance, and the movie Whiteboyz.

== Discography ==
=== Albums ===
- Jitters (CD) LP/CD (Wild West Records, 1996)
- Long Gone (CD) LP/CD (Fluid Recordings, 2001)

=== Singles & EPs ===
- Black and Blue (CD) CD/Maxi (Wild West Records, 1996)
- Dry Me Out! (7") 7" (Wild West Records, 1996)
- Wings (CD) CD/Maxi (Wild West Records, 1996)

=== Compilations ===
- Sampler Rock Sound - Volume 3 (CD) CD (Rock Sound [FRA], 1996)
- Piranha: Music That Bites! Vol.2 (CD) CD (Virgin, 1996)
