= The Sidekicks =

American indie rock band

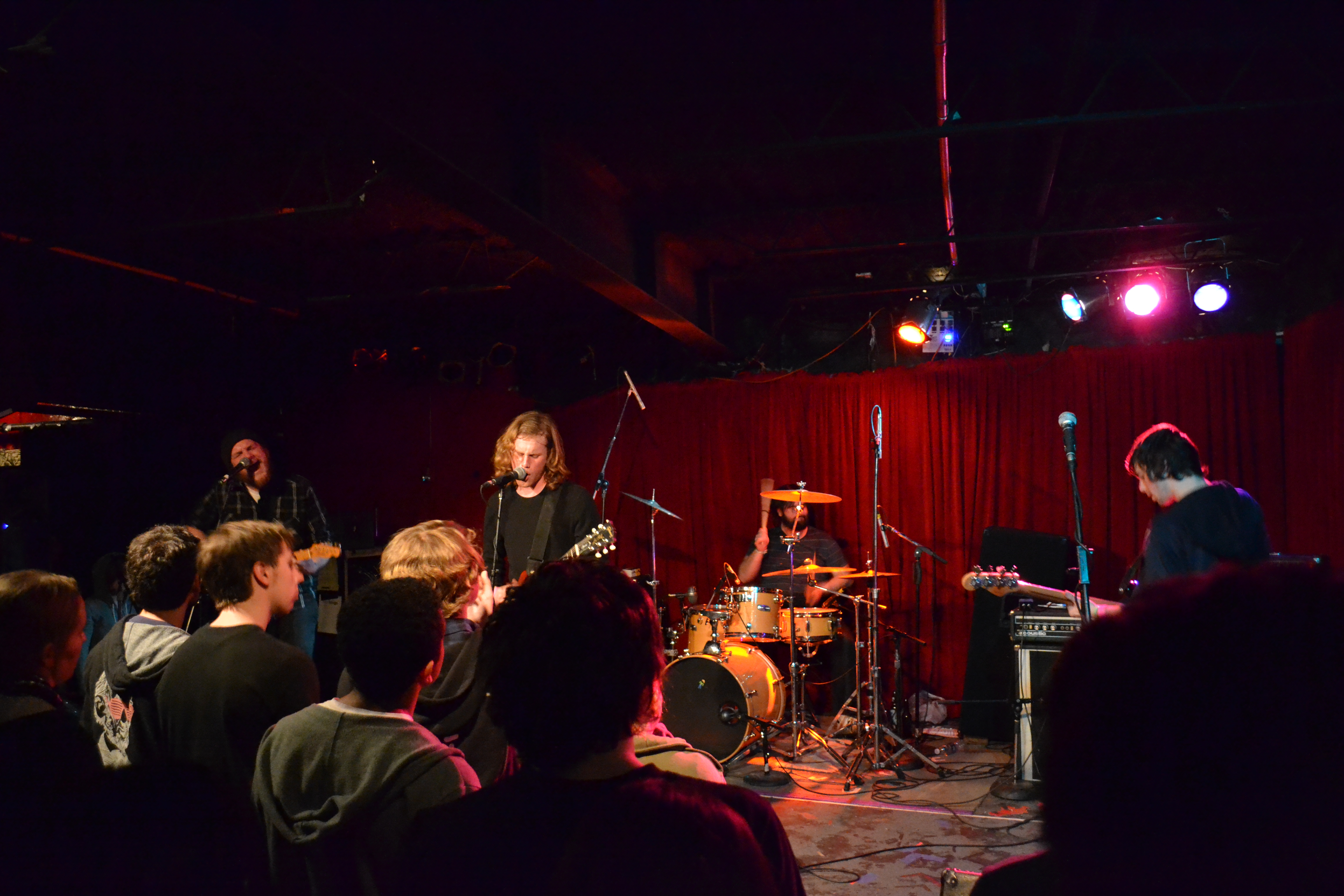

Background information
- Years active: 2006 - 2022
- Labels: Epitaph Records, Red Scare Industries
- Website: www.sidekicksohio.net

The Sidekicks were an American indie rock band from Cleveland, Ohio.

== History ==
The Sidekicks released their first full-length album, So long, Soggy Dog in 2007. The following year, they released the 7" single Sam. In 2009, The Sidekicks released their second full-length album Weight of Air. The Sidekicks released a split with the band Tigers Jaw in 2011. In 2012, The Sidekicks released their third full-length album Awkward Breeds, as well as an EP, Grace. The Sidekicks signed to Epitaph Records in 2014. The Sidekicks released their fourth full-length album Runners In The Nerved World, in 2015. Their fifth and final full-length album, Happiness Hours, was released in 2018.

The band disbanded in December 2022.

== Band members ==
- Steve Ciolek (Vocals & Guitar)
- Toby Reif (Guitar & Vocals)
- Ryan Starinsky (Bass & Vocals)
- Matt Climer (Drums)
