= Cobra Skulls =

American punk rock band

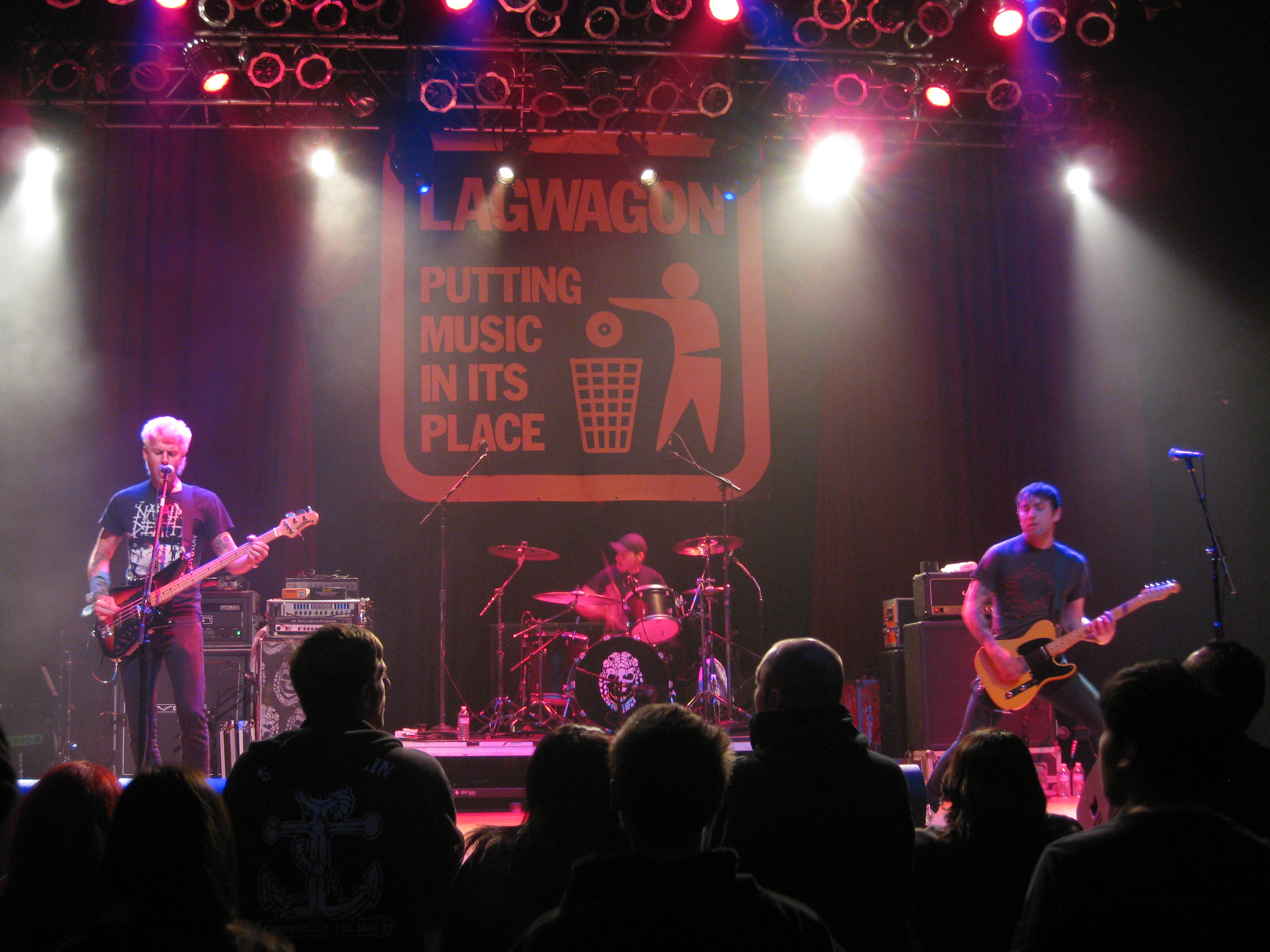
- Left to right: Peralta, Swarm, and Texieira in 2012

Background information
- Origin: Reno, Nevada, United States
- Genres: Punk rock
- Years active: 2005–2013: 2018–present
- Labels: Fat Wreck Chords, Red Scare Industries
- Members: Devin Peralta; Tony Teixeira; Luke Swarm
- Past members: Charlie Parker; Chad Cleveland; Adam Beck

Cobra Skulls are an American punk rock band originally from Reno, Nevada, United States, but later based in the San Francisco Bay Area. They have released three studio albums, five EPs, and three 7" splits.

== History ==
Cobra Skulls were formed in Reno, Nevada, in 2005 by Devin Peralta (bass, vocals), Charlie Parker (guitar) and Chad Cleveland (drums). They released an EP titled Draw Muhammad in 2006. The EP caught the attention of Red Scare Industries who signed the band and released their debut album Sitting Army in 2007. They released a 7" titled Never Be a Machine in 2008.

To promote the album the band went on tour with Against Me!, Mad Caddies, and the Loved Ones, opening shows for them. During the 2007 tour the band added a second guitarist, Adam Beck.

On August 20, 2008, the band announced they had parted ways with guitarist Charlie Parker.

Their second album American Rubicon was released in 2009. Leading up to its release the band participated in the Old Skars and Upstarts Tour with Anti-Nowhere League and Duane Peters. Followed by a west coast tour opening for the Lawrence Arms and Teenage Bottlerocket.

The band signed with Fat Wreck Chords in March 2010. Around this time Chad Cleveland left the band and was replaced by drummer Luke Swarm.

On August 3, 2010, the band announced on their MySpace blog page that they were recording a new five-song EP with Fat Mike This would be released as 2011's Bringing The War Home. One of the songs from the EP, a cover of "Give you Nothing" by Bad Religion, was also featured on the 2010 Bad Religion tribute album Germs Of Perfection.

In 2012 the band parted ways with guitarist Adam Beck, who was replaced by former Nothington bassist Tony Teixeira. In October 2012, the band released the "Eagle Eyes" 7-inch with Fat Wreck Chords, and also premiered a video for the title-track.

In a December 2013 interview with the San Francisco Gate, Peralta announced the band would be "hanging up the hat." They played three final shows that month opening for Good Riddance.

In 2018 the band announced they'd be playing Punk Rock Bowling, which marks the first time playing together in 5 years. They've been playing periodically ever since.

== Post-Cobra Skulls ==
In 2016, Devin Peralta, Tony Teixeira, and Luke Swarm formed a new band, Boys on the Wall. The band released their debut, self-titled album on June 21, 2016.

== Musical style ==
Devin Peralta is half Argentinian and sings some songs in Spanish as can be heard with the tracks "¡Hasta Los Cobra Skulls Siempre!" (from Draw Muhammad EP) and "Use Your Cobra Skulls" (from Sitting Army). While the first track is sung completely in Spanish, the latter track mixes both English and Spanish (not to be confused with Spanglish). "Thicker Than Water" (from American Rubicon LP) also contains lyrics in Spanish.

== Band members ==
- Devin Peralta – vocals and bass (2005–present)
- Luke Swarm – drums (2010–present)
- Tony Teixeira – guitar (2012–present)

== Discography ==
=== Studio albums ===
- Sitting Army (Red Scare Industries, 2007)
- American Rubicon (Red Scare Industries, 2009)
- Agitations (Fat Wreck Chords, 2011)

=== EPs ===
- Eat Your Babies (self-released, 2005)
- Draw Muhammad (Red Scare Industries, 2006)
- Never Be a Machine (Red Scare Industries, 2008)
- Bringing The War Home (Fat Wreck Chords, 2011)
- Eagle Eyes (Fat Wreck Chords, 2012)

=== Splits ===
- Cobra Skulls/Beercan 7" split (Humaniterrorist, 2006)
- Cobra Skulls/Andrew Jackson Jihad 7" split (Suburban Home Records, 2009)
- Cobra Skulls/Larry and his Flask 7" split (Asian Man Records, 2013)

=== Music videos ===
- Rebel Fate (2009)
- Eagle Eyes (2012)
- You Know I Know (2024)

=== Compilation appearances ===
- Rock Against Malaria (Eunuch Records, 2009)
- Untitled 21: A Juvenile Tribute To Swingin' Utters (Red Scare Industries, 2010)
- Germs Of Perfection: A Tribute To Bad Religion (Spin Magazine, 2010)
- Our Lips Are Sealed - A Tribute To THE GO GO's (Solidarity Recordings, 2013)
