= Not Economically Viable =

Studio album by The Methadones
- Released: November 16, 2004
- Genre: Punk rock, pop punk
- Length: 40:03
- Label: Thick

Professional ratings
Review scores
Source	Rating
Punknews.org	3/5 stars

Not Economically Viable is the third album by punk rock band The Methadones. It was released in 2004 by Thick Records. The release was intended as a concept album with a theme inspired by the film Falling Down.

== Reception ==
Upon the albums release, Brian Schultz of Punknews.org described parts of the album as filler. He concluded, "Not Economically Viable is a good album, and perhaps the band's best effort yet, but suffers drastically from a first half in need of serious stitchwork and some tighter threading in the remaining portions."

Stephen Haag of PopMatters notes the despair, pity and “girl problems” present in the album. He concludes "The album is a dozen high-octane punk songs; the Methadones do one thing and they do it well."

Stewart Mason of AllMusic compares the lyrics of the album to those of X, calling them more impressionistic. He writes "the album completes the Methadones' slow transition from garagey punks ... into a more polished power pop outfit".

== Track listing ==
1. "Bored Of Television" - 3:17
2. "Mess We Made" - 3:15
3. "Sorry to Keep You Waiting" - 4:07
4. "What Went Wrong" - 2:51
5. "Annie" - 3:08
6. "Million Miles" - 4:00
7. "Turning Inside Out" - 3:38
8. "Less Than Zero" - 2:04
9. "Hit a Nerve" - 3:14
10. "Transistor Radio" - 2:23
11. "Suddenly Cool" - 4:39
12. "Straight Up Pop Song" - 4:07
