= Resister (album) =

Studio album by The Decline
- Released: June 12, 2015
- Genre: Punk rock
- Length: 32:00
- Label: Pee Records (Australia); Bird Attack Records (United States); Finetunes (Europe); Bells On Records (Japan)

The Decline studio album chronology
Are You Gonna Eat That? (2011)	Resister (2015)	Flash Gordon Ramsay Street (2019)

Resister is the third studio album by the Australian skate punk band The Decline, released on June 12, 2015 on the Pee Records label and distributed internationally by Bird Attack Records (United States), Finetunes (Europe) and Bells On Records (Japan). In support of the album, the band went on a worldwide tour, including the United States, Mexico, Japan, Europe and Australia.

== Track listing ==
No.	Title	Length
1.	"New Again"	01:54
2.	"Giving Up is a Gateway Drug"	03:01
3.	"I Don't Believe"	02:23
4.	"Almost Never Met You"	02:27
5.	"The Blurst of Times"	02:56
6.	"You Call This A Holiday?"	03:19
7.	"Camberwell Street"	02:23
8.	"Broken Bones"	02:49
9.	"Wrecking Ball"	01:41
10.	"You're Not The Waitress"	02:16
11.	"Little Voices"	00:29
12.	"Underworld Tour"	02:50
13.	"Start Again"	03:27

== Personnel ==
- Pat Decline – lead vocals, guitar
- Harry – drums
- Ben Elliott – lead vocals, guitar
- Ray Ray – bass, backing vocal
- Adam Round - Producer, Mixer, Engineer
- Sam Allen - Producer, Mixer, Engineer
- Jason Livermore - Mastering
- Mark McEwen & Brody Simpson - Additional Editing
- Cam Baines (Australian punk band Bodyjar) - Guest Vocals in "I Don't Believe"
