= This Won't Hurt... =

Studio album by The Methadones
- Released: July 10, 2007
- Recorded: Atlas Studios
- Genres: Punk rock, pop punk
- Length: 33:08; 37:42 (Reissue)
- Label: Red Scare

The Methadones chronology
21st Century Power Pop Riot (2006)	This Won't Hurt... (2007)	The Methadones/The Copyrights Split (2008)

This Won't Hurt... is the fifth studio album by punk rock band The Methadones. It was released on July 10, 2007 by Red Scare Industries. In 2022, the album was re-released with the bonus track "Take Me to Japan", including a vinyl pressing.

== Reception ==
Weeks after release in 2007, Brian Schultz of Punknews.org wrote, "the Methadones haven't necessarily progressed terribly far beyond their old selves, but there have been enough subtle changes through the years to finally call them unique," noting that fans of the band would enjoy it.

Ramsey Kanaan of AMP criticized the vocal effects on several of the songs, saying, "it’s a good CD, but a few notches below their last few efforts."

Multiple punk zines reviewed the album. Andy Darling for Maximum Rocknroll called the record "really well written and well played melodic punk," noting, "this is power pop for the new millennium" A review of the album in Razorcake expresses surprise "that it was within poppunk’s molecular structure to mature along with its audience and practitioners?" Joachim Hiller of the German language Ox praised the classic three-chord structure, noting the record still felt contemporary.

== Track listing ==
1. "Six Degrees Of Separation" – 1:27
2. " Getting Older / Losing Touch" – 3:14
3. "Poor Little Rich Girl" – 3:17
4. "Street In My Hometown" – 2:16
5. "Turning Up The Noise" – 3:11
6. "Where Did You Hide The Sun?" – 1:57
7. "Falling Forward" – 3:24
8. "Alcohol Makes The World Go Around" – 2:42
9. "Break Out Of My Head" – 2:30
10. "Starting Line" – 2:54
11. "I Believe" – 2:36
12. "Already Gone" – 3:40

=== Vinyl/digital bonus track ===
13. "Take Me To Japan" – 4:34
