= The Bomb (band) =

American punk rock band

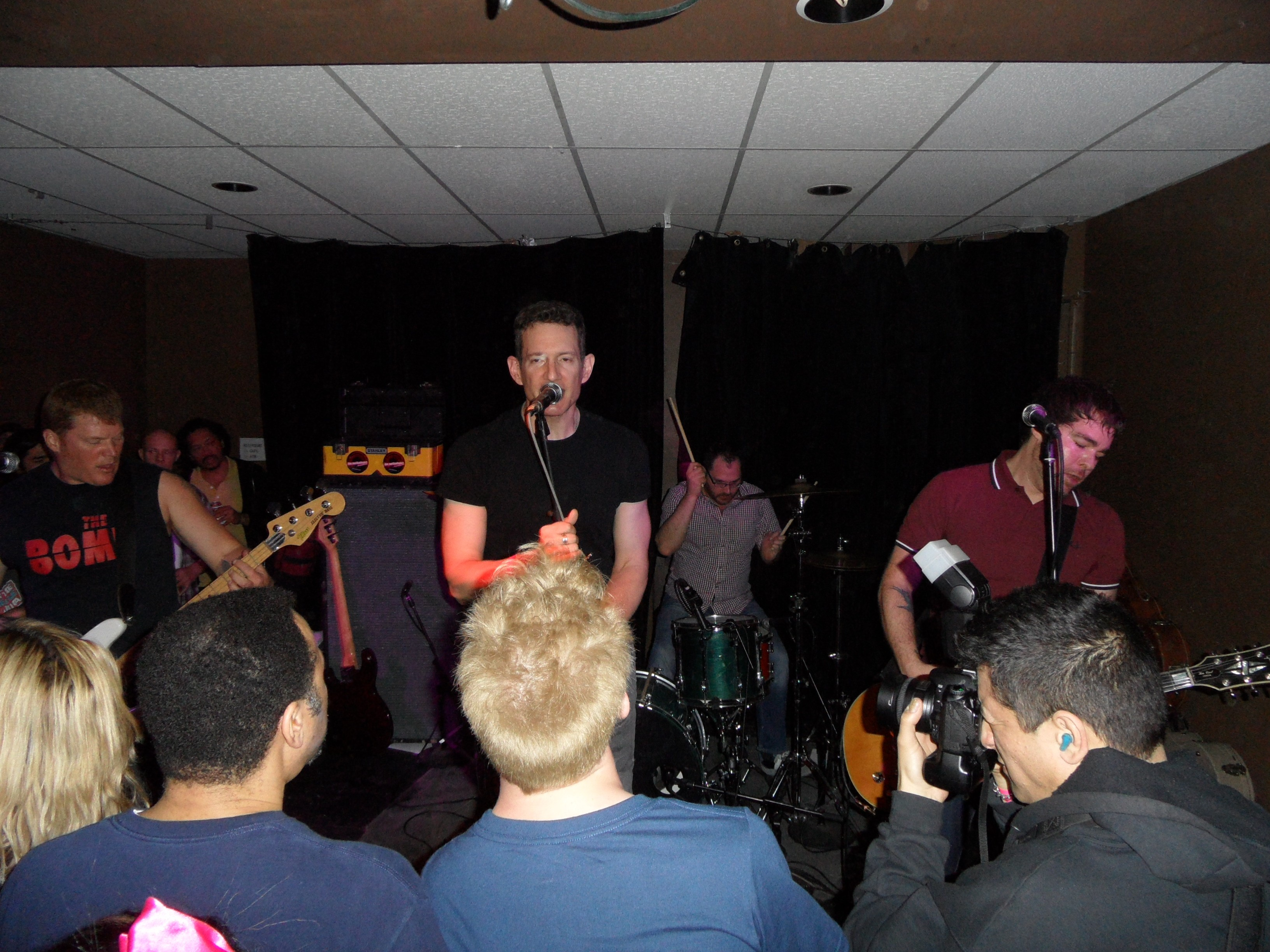
- The Bomb in Chicago 2012

Background information
- Origin: Chicago, Illinois, United States
- Genres: Punk rock
- Years active: 1999-Present
- Labels: Jettison Music, No Idea, Thick
- Members: Jeff Pezzati; Jeff Dean; Sensitive Pete; Mike Soucy
- Past members: John Maxwell; Paul Garcia; Steev Custer
- Website: Myspace

The Bomb started in 1999, formed by Jeff Pezzati of Naked Raygun. Despite the band's quiet beginnings, Steve Albini (Shellac), Big Black, recorded half of their first LP, Torch Songs, which featured the original line-up of John Maxwell (The Mangos) on guitar and Paul Garcia on drums and backing vocals (Death and Memphis), with Steev Custer (Death and Memphis) taking over bass duties. In 2002, Jeff Dean (Noise By Numbers, Explode and Make Up, All Eyes West & Dead Ending) replaced Maxwell on guitar, and in 2003 Custer and Garcia were replaced by Pete Mittler (The Methadones, Naked Raygun), Mike Soucy, The Methadones, Jetlag). This has been the definitive line up of the band.

Not to be confused with the earlier San Francisco band, Bomb (1986-1993).

== Press Notoriety ==
- "The Bomb, which is enough like Naked Raygun to appeal to old-school fans, but unique enough to please Punk/Post Punk fans who wouldn't know a Naked Raygun from a Jesus Lizard" - City Beat Cincinnati
- "Chicago has never produced a better rock band than Naked Raygun, and it's too bad they're not around anymore to remind us of why. But Raygun singer Jeff Pezzati still occasionally struts his stuff with this quartet, and "Indecision" upholds the legacy: brisk melodies, anthem-ready choruses, brutish guitars and drums, all honed to a fine point by the production of ex-Jawbox maestro J. Robbins. " - Our picks for the best local indie releases of 2005 - Greg Kot - Chicago Tribune
- "Not that anyone is going to confuse The Bomb's sonic, three-minute epics with the current crop of pop-tart fluff like Britney and Christina. Songs like "I Need You" and "Can Jeannie Come Out Tonight?" are steeped in influences that emulate the muscular melodies of The Jam ("Just their first two albums," [Jeff Pezatti] clarifies) and Cheap Trick with a Buzzcocks aesthetic thrown in for good measure. Occasionally they do subliminally ape their predecessors, but they always manage to transcend the sum of their record collections, in large part because of Pezatti's now patented "whoa ho" refrains and foreboding delivery." (Curt Baran, Chicago Tribune)

== Discography ==
=== EPs ===
- ...Arming (Modern) (1999)
- The Axis Of Awesome (No Idea) (2015)

=== Albums ===
- Torch Songs (Jettison) (2000)
- Indecision (Thick) (2005)
- Speed Is Everything (No Idea) (2009)
- The Challenger (No Idea) (2011)

=== Compilation appearances ===
- Magnetic Curses: A Chicago Punk Rock Compilation (Thick) (2000) - "Can Jeannie Come Out Tonight"
- AMP Sampler Volume 17 (Amp Magazine) (2005) - "Indecision"
- Ox-Compilation #62-Ach, Hatte Ich Nur Auf Mutten Gehort... (Ox Fanzine) (2005) - "Indecision"
- Mean It Man (Thick) (2005) - "Indecision", "Failures"
- Hair: Chicago Punk Cuts (Thick) (2006) - "Spaceman"
- No Idea Presents: Fest 8 (No Idea) (2009) - "Spaceman"
- BYAF VII: The Comp (Part Two) (Make-That-A-Take) (2013) - "The Kids"
