= Masked Intruder =

American punk rock band

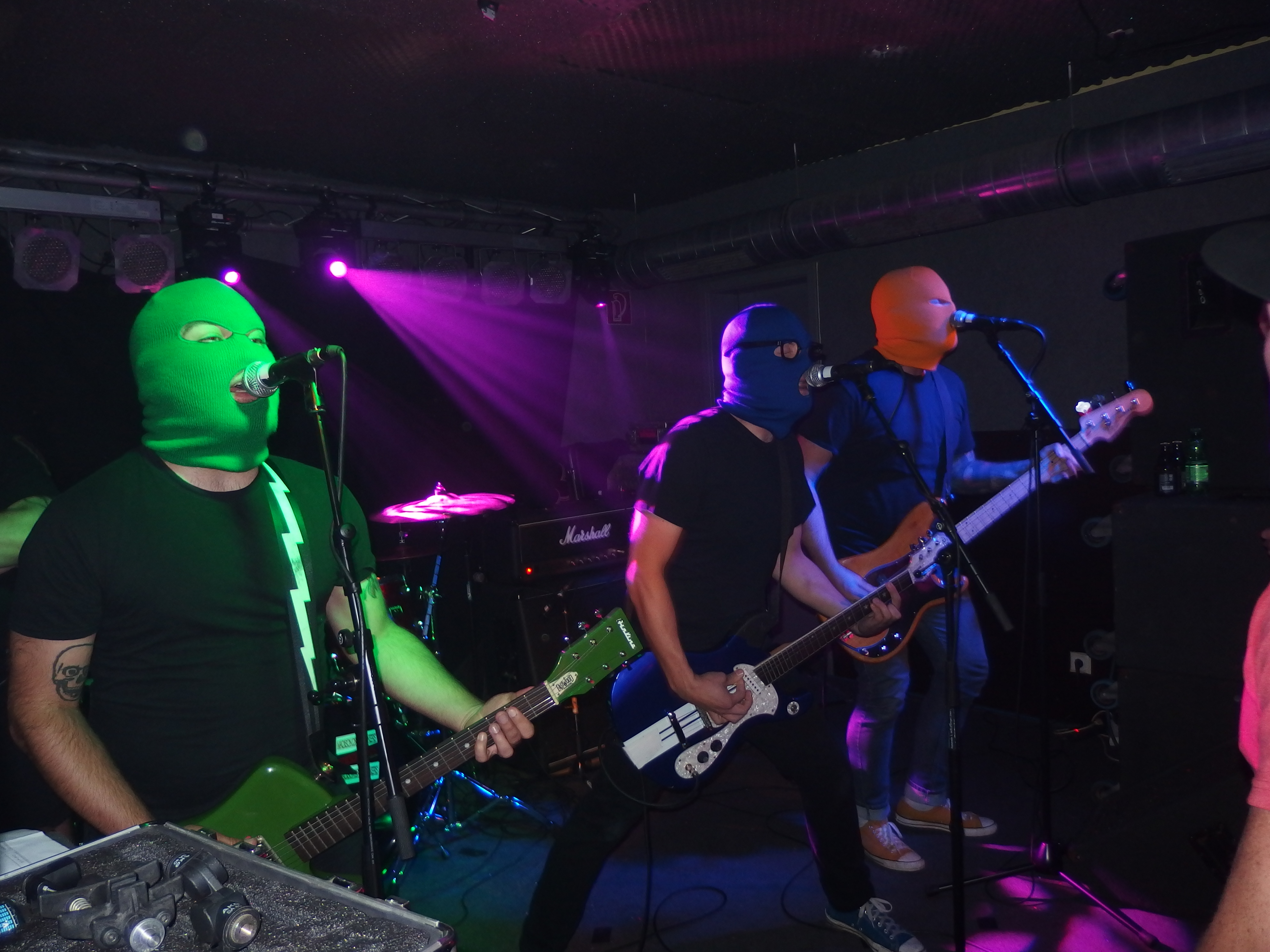
- Masked Intruder performing in September 2014; from left to right: Intruder Green, Intruder Red (off-camera) Intruder Blue and Intruder Yellow

Background information
- Origin: Madison, Wisconsin, U.S.
- Genres: Punk rock; pop punk; power pop
- Years active: 2010–present
- Labels: Pure Noise; Fat Wreck Chords; Red Scare; Solidarity; Hang Up
- Members: Intruder Blue; Intruder Green; Intruder Red; Officer Bradford; Intruder Purple
- Past members: Intruder Yellow (in Jail)
- Website: maskedintruderband.com

Masked Intruder is an anonymous American rock band from Madison, Wisconsin.

The members of the band are Intruder Yellow (bass, backing vocals), Intruder Green (rhythm guitar, backing vocals), Intruder Red (drums, backing vocals), and Intruder Blue (lead vocals, lead guitar). The band claims Intruder Yellow is currently in jail. They are known for wearing different colored ski masks and shoes on stage, using color-coded instruments, and never revealing their identities in publicity photos. They are also known for their early pop punk sound with their fast-paced songs, usually about love. Their self-titled debut album was released by Red Scare in 2012 and then re-released by Fat Wreck Chords in 2013. When live and sometimes in videos, Masked Intruder is watched by Officer Bradford, a cop who acts as a hypeman for the band and a plot device for the band's music videos.

== History ==
=== Formation and Masked Intruder (2010–2013) ===
Intruder Blue and Intruder Green claim to have met and formed the band while in jail. The band has claimed their first show was at The Frequency in their hometown of Madison, Wisconsin.

=== III and recent activity (2019–present) ===
Masked Intruder were included in the exhibits on display at the Punk Rock Museum in Las Vegas, while Intruder Blue also gave guided tours in April 2023.

Following continued questioning on if the band was still together, Blue made a post on the band's Facebook page giving an update on their activities on April 22, 2023. In the post he claimed that the band was still together, but that multiple complications have halted their activities. Additionally, he also confirmed that they were writing new music, and that it will be released when the time is right.

== Band members ==
=== Current members ===
- Intruder Blue - lead vocals, lead guitar (2010–present)
- Intruder Green - rhythm guitar, backing vocals (2010–present)
- Intruder Red - drums, backing vocals (2010–present)

=== Former members ===
- Intruder Yellow (Jason Kalsow) - bass, backing vocals (2010–2019)

=== Touring members ===
- Officer Bradford (Jackson Bradford) - hypeman (2010–present)
- Intruder Purple - bass, backing vocals (2019–present)

== Discography ==
=== Studio albums ===
- Masked Intruder (2012, Red Scare Industries)
  - Re-released on Fat Wreck Chords in 2013
- M.I. (2014, Fat Wreck Chords)
- III (2019, Pure Noise Records)
- [Super Masked Intruder] III Turbo (2020, Pure Noise Records)

=== Extended plays ===
- Incriminating Evidence: 2011 Demos (2011, self-released)
  - Re-released on Red Scare Industries
- First Offence (2012, Red Scare Industries, Hang Up Records)
- Masked Intruder/The Turkletons (2012, Hang Up Records, split with The Turkletons)
- The Wedding 7" (2013, Solidarity Recordings, split with Dan Vapid and the Cheats)
- Red Scare Across America (2013, Red Scare Industries, split with Elway and Sam Russo)
- Under the Mistletoe 7" (2013, Fat Wreck Chords: 7", Red Scare Industries: digital format)
- Love and Other Crimes (2016, Pure Noise Records)

=== Singles ===
Year	Title	Album/EP
2012	"Stick ‘Em Up (I Have A Knife)"	First Offense
2014	"The Most Beautiful Girl"	M.I.
2014	"Take What I Want"	Love and Other Crimes
2019	"No Case"	III
2019	"Please Come Back To Me"	III
2019	"All of My Love"	III

=== Compilation albums ===
Title	Album details
III Turbo	Released: July 14, 2020; Label: Pure Noise; Format: Digital download, streaming

=== Compilation appearances ===
- Our Lips Are Sealed: A Tribute to the Go Go's (2013, Solidarity Recordings)
  - Features the non-album track "We Got the Beat"
- Red Scare Industries: 10 Years of Your Dumb Bullshit (2014, Red Scare Records)
  - Features the track "I Don't Mind"
- Fat Music Vol. 8 Going Nowhere Fat (2015, Fat Wreck Chords)
  - Features the track "The Most Beautiful Girl"

=== Music videos ===
- "I Don't Wanna Be Alone Tonight" (2013)
- "Crime Spree" (2014)
- "The Most Beautiful Girl" (2014, Lyric Video)
- "Beyond a Shadow of a Doubt" (2016)
- "First Star Tonight" (2017)
- "No Case" (2019)
- "All of My Love" (2019)

== Filmography ==
Year	Title	Role	Notes
Unknown	Chic-a-Go-Go	Themselves	Performed the song "Unrequited Love"
