= Rick Uncapher =

American bass player (born 1970)

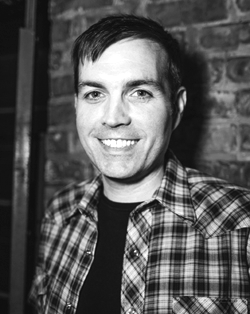

Background information
- Born: March 3, 1970 (age 55); Pittsburgh, PA
- Genres: Punk rock, Pop punk
- Occupation: Musician
- Instrument: Bass
- Years active: 1995–present
- Labels: Asian Man, Underground Communique Records, Solidarity, Boss Tuneage, Jump Start Records
- Member of: Noise by Numbers
- Formerly of: Dan Vapid and the Cheats, Textbook, Woolworthy, The Addisons
- Website: runcapher.com

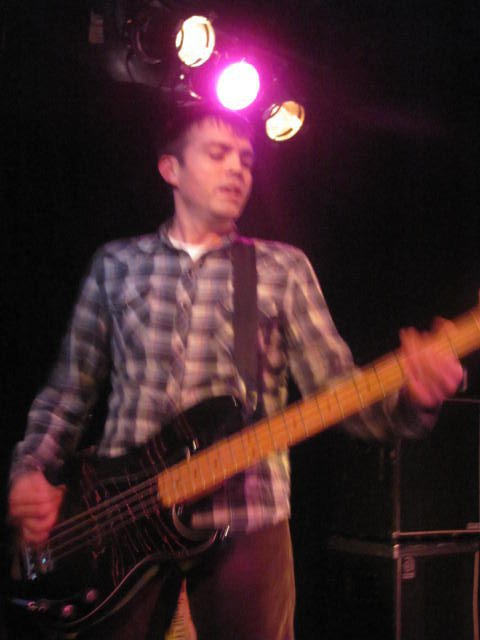
With Noise by Numbers, Chicago 2011

Richard Uncapher (born March 3, 1970) is an American bass player who was born and raised Pittsburgh, Pennsylvania and lives in Chicago, Illinois. He has played in many different bands in Chicago, the most notable bands being Dan Vapid and the Cheats, Noise by Numbers, Textbook, Woolworthy, and The Addisons.

== Partial discography ==
=== Woolworthy ===
- Sweet Second Place (1998)
- Blasted Into Ashes (2001, Boss Tuneage)
- Recycler (1996-2002) (2002, Boss Tuneage)

=== Textbook ===
- The Great Salt Creek (2005, Playing Field Recordings)
- Boxing Day Massacre (2008)
- Out of My Universe EP (2011)
- All Messed Up (2014, Torture Chamber Records)
- On The B-Side (Best of 2000 - 2015) (2016, Paper + Plastick Records)

=== Noise by Numbers ===
- Yeah, Whatever... (2009, Asian Man Records, Solidarity Recordings)
- Over Leavitt (2011, Jump Start Records)
- High on Drama EP (2015, Jump Start Records)

=== Dan Vapid & the Cheats ===
- Two (2013, Torture Chamber Records)
