= Red City Radio =

American punk rock band

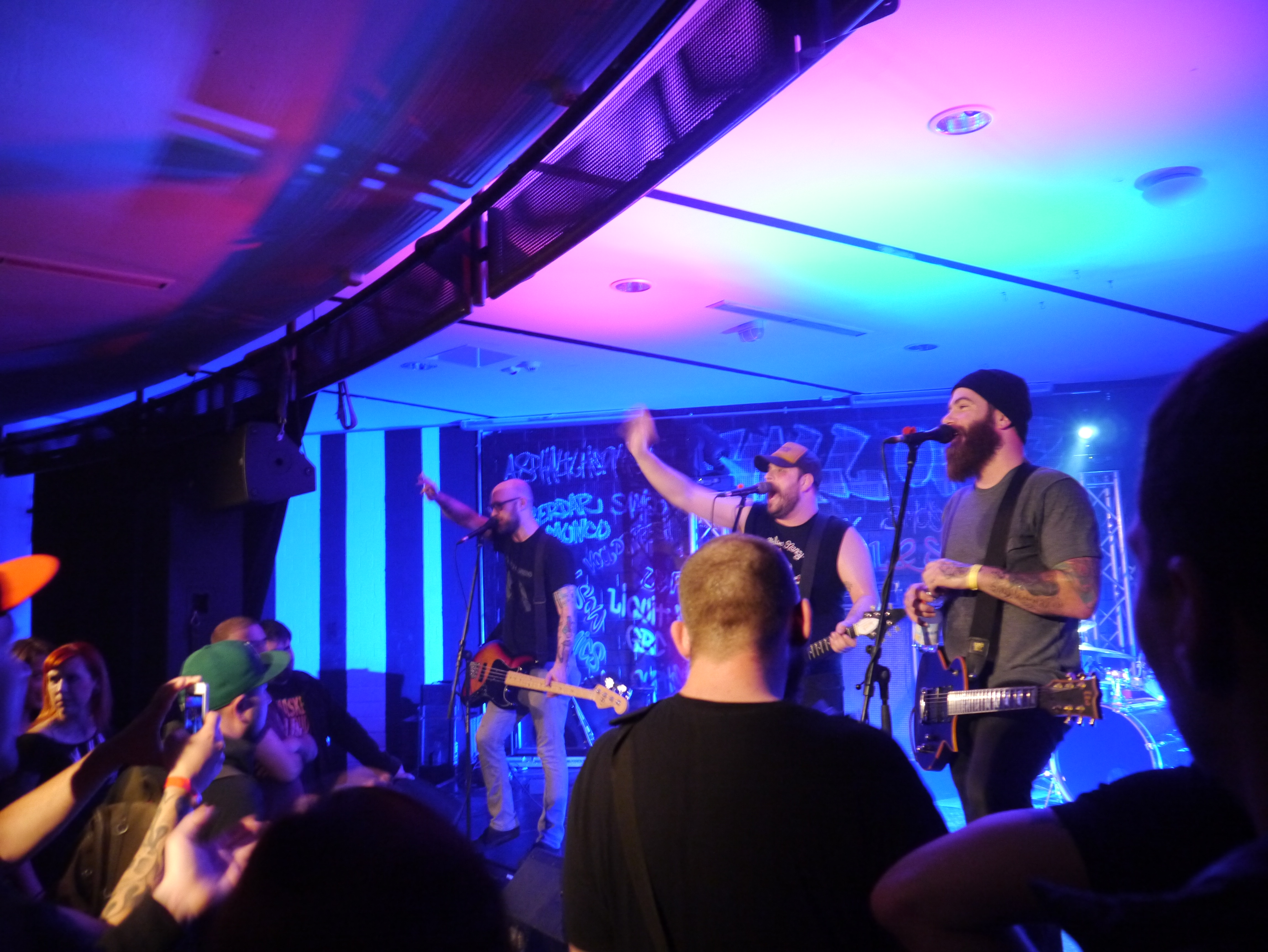

Background information
- Origin: Oklahoma City, Oklahoma, United States
- Genres: Punk rock, alternative rock, pop punk
- Years active: 2007-2023
- Labels: Staple Records, Paper + Plastick, Pure Noise Records
- Past members: Garrett Dale; Ryan Donovan; Dallas Tidwell; Derik Envy; Jonathan Knight; Paul Pendley; Justin Porterfield
- Website: redcityradio.com

Red City Radio was an American punk rock band from Oklahoma City, Oklahoma, formed in 2007. The band's lineup consisted of Garrett Dale, Ryan Donovan, Derik Envy and Dallas Tidwell.

== History ==
The band has released an EP, To the Sons and Daughters of Woody Guthrie, three full-length albums, The Dangers of Standing Still, Titles (on the Paper + Plastick label), and Red City Radio, as well as two split EPs and a digital single. In 2014, one of the band's lead singers, Paul Pendley, left the band and was replaced by Ryan Donovan, formerly in the Red Scare Industries punk band Nothington. Garrett Dale is now the band's only lead singer and songwriter. Red City Radio have toured in Europe, Russia, Canada as well as in the U.S.

== Line-up ==
Garrett Dale - lead vocals, guitar (2007–present)
Ryan Donovan - guitar, backing vocals (2014–present)
Derik Envy - bass (2019–present)
Dallas Tidwell - drums, backing vocals (2007–present)

Previous members
Paul Pendley - guitar, lead and backing vocals (2007–2014)
Justin Porterfield - bass (2007–2009)
Jonathan Knight - bass, backing vocals (2009–2019)

== Discography ==
- Midwestern Hymnal EP (split) (2007, The Independent Record Company)
- To the Sons and Daughters of Woody Guthrie EP (2009, The Independent Record Company)
- split EP with The Great St. Louis (2010, All In Vinyl)
- The Dangers of Standing Still (2011, Paper + Plastick)
- split EP with The Gamits (2011, Paper + Plastick)
- Titles (2013, Paper + Plastick)
- Chronic Dookie EP (2015, Gunner Records)
- Red City Radio (2015, Staple Records)
- SkyTigers EP (2018, Red Scare Industries)
- Paradise (2020, Pure Noise Records)

== Videography ==
- "We Are the Sons and Daughters of Woodie Guthrie"
- "Two Notes Shy of an Octave"
- "I'm Well You're Poison"
- "Two Outta Three Ain't Rad"
- "Punks in Vegas Sessions"
