= Sensitive Pete =

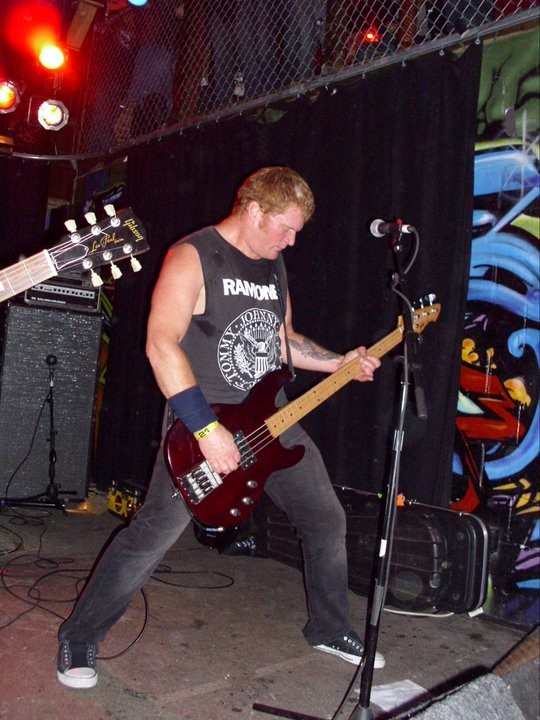

Background information
- Origin: Chicago, Illinois
- Genres: Punk rock, pop punk
- Occupation: Musician
- Instruments: Vocals, bass guitar
- Years active: 1989–present
- Labels: Lookout!, Asian Man, Recess, Selfless Records, Fat Wreck Chords

Sensitive Pete is best known as the bass player for The Bollweevils, Naked Raygun, The Methadones, The Bomb, Explode And Make Up, and the Neutron Bombs.

== Biography ==
Pete grew up on the north west side of Chicago. His mother is a Chicago police officer. Pete started playing guitar and bass guitar at the age of 12 years. When Pete was 16 he joined his first band, named Last Vatican Council. He was part of the original line-up of the Methadones, which started in 1993. That version of the band soon disbanded but the band reformed in 2000 and lasted until 2010.

In 2003 Pete joined The Bomb, the side-project band for Naked Raygun lead vocalist Jeff Pezzati.

In 2011 Pete was invited to fill in on bass for a convalescing Pierre Kezdy of Naked Raygun. He left Naked Raygun in June 2014.
