= The Bollweevils =

Punk band from Chicago

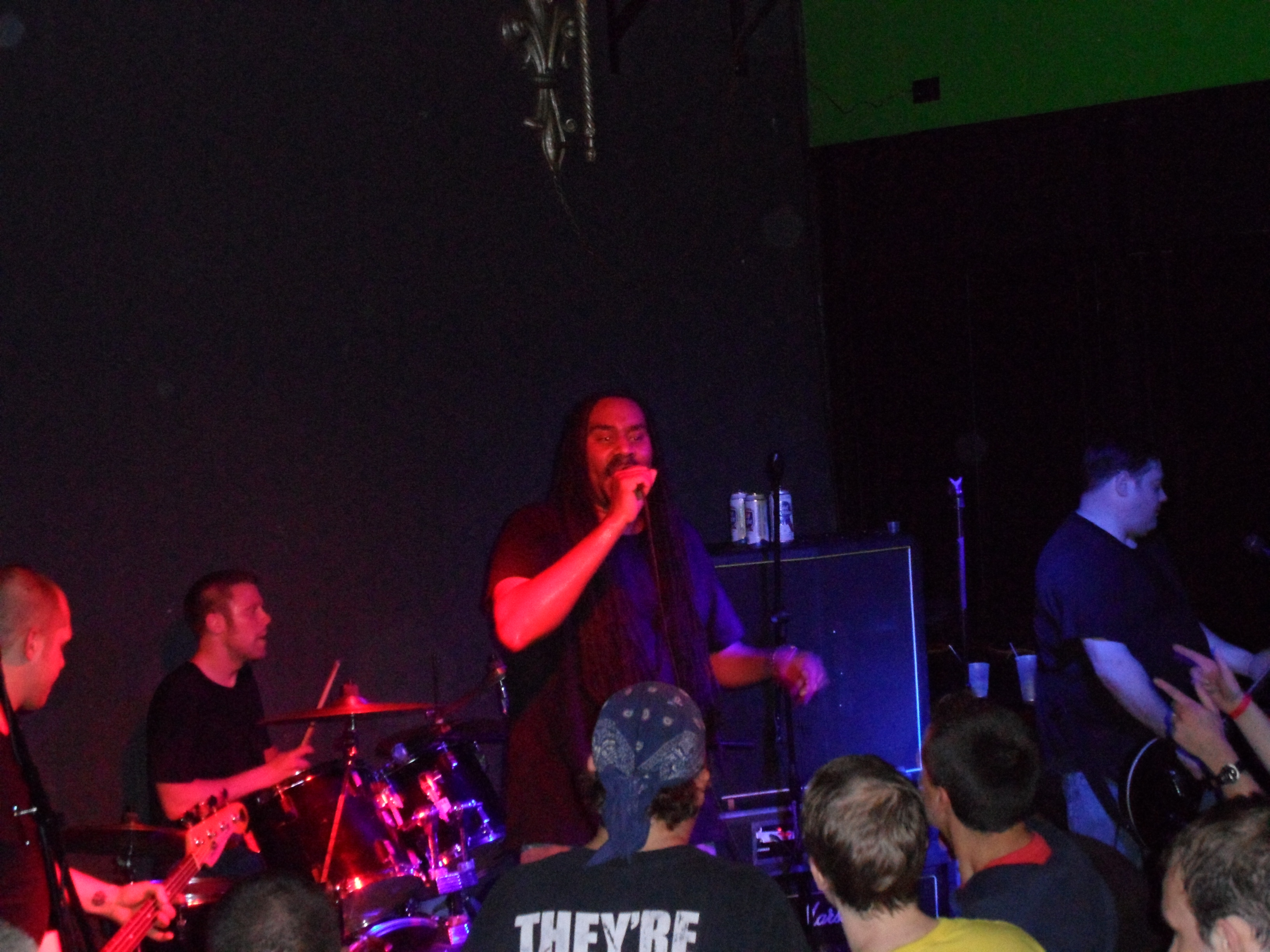

Background information
- Origin: Chicago
- Genres: Punk rock
- Years active: 1989–1996, 2003; 2006-present
- Labels: Go Deaf Records LLC; Dr. Strange Records; Red Scare
- Members: Daryl Wilson; Ken Fitzner; Pete Mumford; Joe Mizzi
- Past members: Bob Skwerski; Brian Czarnik; Brett Friesen; Pete Mittler
- Website: thebollweevils.bandcamp.com

The Bollweevils is a punk band from Chicago.

The members consist of Daryl Wilson on vocals, Joe Mizzi on bass, Ken Fitzner ("Ken Weevil") on guitar, and Pete Mumford on drums.

Former members include founding bass player, Bob Skwerski, Brian Czarnik (who played simultaneously in Oblivion) on drums later replaced by Brett Friesen (who played simultaneously in Houseboy). Pete Mittler played bass from 2017-2023. The Bollweevils formed during the Naked Raygun era which was where the band members met and also, for whom they eventually opened.

The group released a number of albums on Dr. Strange Records; though, their first, minor releases were on Underdog Records (Chicago). The group's current record label, Go Deaf Records LLC, is owned and operated by the band. The Bollweevils released a new album, "Essential," on Red Scare Industries in 2023. It was their first album release in 14 years.

== History ==
In a 2011 interview, Ken Weevil detailed the band's origins and their opening for Naked Raygun in 1989: "I sent a letter with a tape to Naked Raygun. I had forgot to include a phone number. I just wanted to let them know that I loved the band. One day, I got a letter back asking us if we wanted to play with them at the Metro. It was the Metro's 9th anniversary show. We opened the show." The show was the first with Darryl Wilson as lead vocalist.

In the summer of 1993, the band went on a cross-country road tour with the Smoking Popes and 88 Fingers Louie.

The Bollweevils' July 4, 1995 show at the Metro was recorded by Elliott Dicks and Robby Campbell and released on Dr. Strange Records as Weevillive. While Bollweevils shows were normally peaceful affairs the July 4th show was notable as Wilson, after Metro security became physically aggressive with audience members, declared the band would never play the Metro again. Famously, an audience member declared over the PA: "Let the fucking kids have fun, assholes."

== Hiatus (1996–2003) ==
Ultimately, the Bollweevils dissipated when Daryl completed medical school and became a doctor. Ken started a new band, The Feds. The Bollweevils played their 'last' show at the Fireside Bowl on Saturday, November 2, 1996 headlining after bands The Fixtures, The Undesirables, The Freeze, and Whatever.

== Reunions and Current Lineup ==
The Bollweevils reunited for one show in late 2003 for WLUW, the college radio station at Loyola University Chicago, and then again on November 3 and played a show at Double Door and November 5, 2006, for Riot Fest at the Congress Theater, which Naked Raygun headlined. The group says it will play another show if they can get 1000 friends on their MySpace account. In 2007, the group posted on their official website: "The Bollweevils reunion at Riot Fest 2006 wasn't a one-off deal and we're all super stoked to say that we’re a band again".

In 2011, The Bollweevils amicably parted ways with founding bassist, Bob Skwerski, and recruited bass player, Miguel Perez.

The band was performing actively and working on new music as of 2012.

== Discography ==
=== Albums ===
- Stick Your Neck Out! (released 1994 on Dr. Strange Records)
- History of the Bollweevils, Part I (released 1995 on Dr. Strange Records) - compilation of pre-Stick Your Neck Out releases
- Heavyweight (released 1995 on Dr. Strange Records)
- Weevillive (released 1996 on Dr. Strange Records) - live album
- History of the Bollweevils, Part II (released 1999 on Dr. Strange Records) - compilation of post-Stick Your Neck Out releases
- Essential (2023 Red Scare)

=== Minor releases ===
- "A Very Punk Christmas" (Various Artists, 2×7″ released 1993 on Rocco Records/Further Beyond Records)
- "Viva Chicago" (Bollweevils / 88 Fingers Louie split 7-inch covering classic Chicago punk, released 1994 on Rocco Records)
- A Deadly Duo (Bollweevils/The Freeze split, released 1996 on Dr. Strange Records)
- "Carol EP" (Bollweevils/4-Squares split) released 1997 Dr. Strange Records Quincy Shanks Records: 4-Squares Releases
- Plan 7-inch From Outer Space! (Bollweevils/Sleepasaurus split, released 1997 on Motherbox Records)
- Doc Hopper/ Bollweevils split (released 1997)
