= Sludgeworth =

American punk rock band

- Origin: Chicago, Illinois
- Genre: Punk rock
- Years active: 1989–1992; 2007; 2008; 2022-present
- Labels: Lookout!, Johann's Face, Red Scare
- Spinoff of: Screeching Weasel
- Members: Dan Schafer (vocals); Adam White (guitar); Dave McClean (guitar); Mike Hooten (Strat) (bass); Brian Vermin (drums)

Sludgeworth is an American punk rock band from Chicago consisting of Dan Schafer (vocals), Adam White (guitar), Dave McClean (guitar), Mike Hootenstrat (bass), and Brian Vermin (drums).

The band was formed in 1989 as a side project from Screeching Weasel, a band that Dan and Brian were in. Later that year, the two decided to leave Screeching Weasel to focus full-time on Sludgeworth. The band released their first self-titled EP in 1990, followed by a full-length album, What's This? in 1991. That same year, Dan Schafer joined a resurrected Screeching Weasel. Sludgeworth announced their split in late 1992.

The breakup was due to musical differences between Schafer and the other members, with the former wanting to continue playing pop punk and the others wanting to not be restricted by that definition. Sludgeworth played their last show in early 1993. The rest of the group formed Ethyline (initially called Pound) with a new singer. In 1995, a collection of their music was released by Lookout! Records on the compilation album Losers of the Year.

In 2007, the band announced they would reunite for that year's Riot Fest. The group also appeared at Insubordination Fest in 2008, which resulted in a live CD/DVD release.

In 2022, the band announced their official reunion and their official repressing of Losers of the Year via Red Scare Industries. On May 27, 2024, the band launched the EP, Together Not Together.

On April 28, 2026, the band announced their second studio album, Second Time Around, released on June 19 of the same year through Red Scare Industries.

== Discography ==
Albums

- What's This? (Johann's Face Records, 1991)
- Second Time Around (Red Scare, 2026)

EPs

- Sludgeworth (Roadkill Records, 1990)
- Brightside (self-released, 1992)
- Together Not Together (Red Scare, 2024)

Compilations

- Losers of the Year (Lookout Records, 1995, re-released on Red Scare, 2022)
- Insubordination Fest '08: Live From Baltimore (Insubordination Records, 2009)
