= Red Scare Industries =

American punk rock record label

- Founded: 2004
- Founder: Toby Jeg
- Genre: Punk rock
- Country of origin: U.S.
- Location: Chicago, Illinois
- Official website: www.redscare.net

Red Scare Industries (sometimes referred to as Red Scare Records) is a punk rock record label. The label was established in San Francisco (but moved to Chicago) by Toby Jeg, a former Fat Wreck Chords employee.

Jeg started the label in 2004 when his friend Brendan Kelly from The Lawrence Arms needed a new label to release the EP for his new band, The Falcon. Since its inception, Red Scare has released material for bands, including The Lillingtons, Cobra Skulls, The Copyrights, Sundowner, Teenage Bottlerocket, and more. In 2010 and 2011, albums released by Red Scare artists The Menzingers and The Sidekicks were named album of the year by punknews.org.

Additionally, the label has collaborated with non-Red Scare artists on projects, including "Red Oktoberfest," an annual weekend music festival in Chicago which has featured bands such as The Lawrence Arms, American Steel, and Off With Their Heads, and the Swingin' Utters tribute album, Untitled 21: A Juvenile Tribute to the Swingin' Utters, which most notably featured the Dropkick Murphys.

== Artists ==
=== Current artists ===
- Arms Aloft
- Brendan Kelly & The Wandering Birds
- Broadway Calls
- The Brokedowns
- Bullets To Broadway
- Elway
- The Falcon
- Fléau
- Good Friend
- Guerilla Poubelle
- Heart & Lung
- The Holy Mess
- The Heat Tape
- Joe McMahon
- No Trigger
- Ramona
- Reaganomics
- SACK
- Sam Russo
- Sicko
- Sludgeworth
- Tightwire
- The Bollweevils
- Tired Radio
- Vultures United
- Won't Stay Dead

=== Former artists ===
- Billy Liar (active with Pirates Press Records)
- The Bombpops (active with Fat Wreck Chords)
- The Copyrights (active with Fat Wreck Chords)
- Cobra Skulls (active with Fat Wreck Chords)
- Direct Hit (active with Fat Wreck Chords)
- Druglords Of The Avenues (active with Pirates Press Records)
- Enemy You (disbanded)
- La Plebe (disbanded)
- Laura Jane Grace (active with Polyvinyl Record Co.)
- The Lillingtons (disbanded)
- Nothington (disbanded)
- MakeWar (active with Fat Wreck Chords)
- Masked Intruder (active with Pure Noise Records)
- The Isotopes (active with Stomp Records)
- The Methadones
- The Menzingers (active with Epitaph Records)
- The Lippies (disbanded)
- Red City Radio (active with Pure Noise Records)
- The Riptides (active with Pirates Press Records)
- The Sidekicks (disbanded)
- Sincere Engineer (active with Hopeless Records)
- Success (disbanded)
- Sundowner (active with Fat Wreck Chords)
- Teenage Bottlerocket (active with Pirates Press Records)
