= The Methadones =

American punk rock band

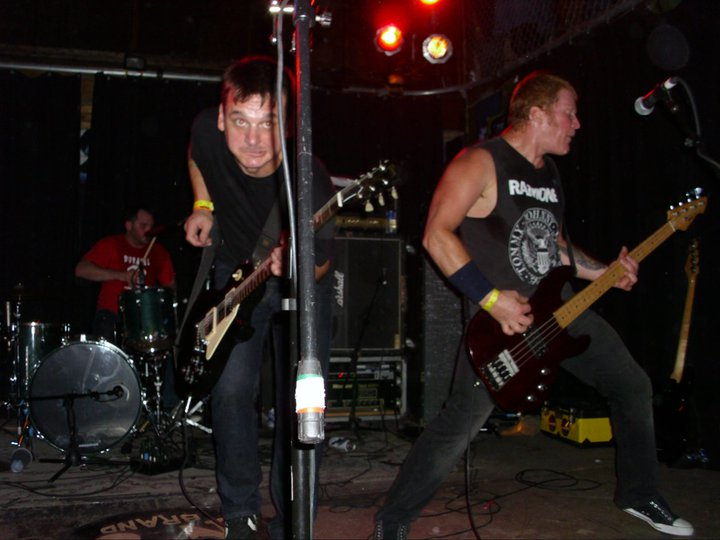
- Live in Chicago, November 2010.

Background information
- Origin: Chicago, Illinois, United States
- Genres: Punk rock
- Years active: 1993, 1999–2010, 2011, 2014, 2020, 2022-present
- Labels: A-F; Thick; Red Scare; Transparent; Asian Man
- Members: Dan Vapid; Simon Lamb; Sensitive Pete; Mike Soucy
- Past members: Mike Byrne; Pat Buckley; Dan Panic; B-Face; Dan Lumley; Matt Drastic; Ken Fused; Joe Principe

The Methadones are a Punk rock band formed in 1993 by guitarist/vocalist Dan Vapid in Chicago, Illinois. The Methadones initially lasted only a few shows before Vapid put them to the side to focus on his main band Screeching Weasel. By 1999 Dan was no longer a member of Screeching Weasel or his other band The Riverdales, and decided to restart The Methadones with B-Face of The Queers on bass, and Dan Lumley on drums. The band recorded their first album Ill at Ease in 2001. After the recording, B-Face and Lumley left the band. Schafer formed a new lineup of The Methadones with guitarist Mike Byrne, bassist Sensitive Pete, and drummer Mike Soucy.

On June 11, 2010, The Methadones announced their disbandment on their Myspace page stating that, "it's been 10 years and we've had a lot of fun, but we all agree that it's just time."

The band published a collection of five brand-new songs, all of their 7" songs, and a few bonus tracks for their farewell album, simply titled The Methadones.

The Methadones reunited for a few songs during a performance of Dan Vapid and the Cheats at the Cobra Lounge in Chicago on May 27, 2011, and again in October 2014, for a show celebrating the 10th anniversary of Red Scare Industries.

Currently the band has been making some sporadic appearances since 2020.

== Band members ==
- Dan Vapid - vocals, guitar (1993, 1999–2010, 2011, 2014, 2020, 2022–present)
- Sensitive Pete - guitar, bass (1993, 2001–2010, 2011, 2014, 2020, 2022–present)
- Pat Buckley - drums (1993)
- Dan Panic - drums (1993)
- B-Face - bass (1999–2001)
- Mike Byrne - guitar (2001–2010, 2011, 2014)
- Dan Lumley - drums (1999–2001)
- Simon Lamb (2020, 2022–present)
- Mike Soucy - drums (2003–2010, 2011, 2014, 2020, 2022–present)
- Ken Fused - guitar (2007)

== Discography ==
=== Studio albums ===
- Ill at Ease – A-F Records, September 25, 2001
- Career Objective – Thick Records, July 15, 2003
- Not Economically Viable – Thick Records, November 16, 2004
- 21st Century Power Pop Riot – Red Scare Industries, June 6, 2006
- This Won't Hurt... – Red Scare Industries, July 10, 2007

=== Extended Plays ===
- Love On Layaway – Red Scare Industries, May 30, 2025

=== Split albums ===
- The Methadones/The Copyrights Split – Transparent Records, Jun 2008

=== Singles ===
- "I Believe" – Underground Communique! Records, June 26, 2009
- "Gary Glitter" - It's Alive Records, 2009

=== Compilation albums ===
- The Methadones – Asian Man Records, November 16, 2010

=== Compilation appearances ===
- 1157 Wheeler Avenue: A Memorial For Amadou Diallo – Failed Experiment Records, June 25, 2002
- Sex and Subversion – Thick Records, October 28, 2003
- Go Kart MP300 – Go Kart Records, October 28, 2003
- AMP Presents Vol. 4 – American Music Press, February 22, 2005
- Take Me Down To The Punkrock City – Squash, June 1, 2005
- Mean It Man – Thick Records, September 13, 2005
- Punk Rock Mix Tape – FastMusic, 2006
- Hair: Chicago Punk Cuts – Thick Records, September 12, 2006
- I Killed Punk Rock - Bouncing Betty Records, October 3, 2006
- Plea For Peace Vol. 2 - Asian Man Records, April 24, 2007
- Insubordination Fest 2009 - Insubordination Records, May 4, 2010
- Red Scare Industries: 10 Years of Your Dumb Bullshit - Red Scare Industries, September 9, 2014
