= Insubordination Fest =

American annual punk rock music festival

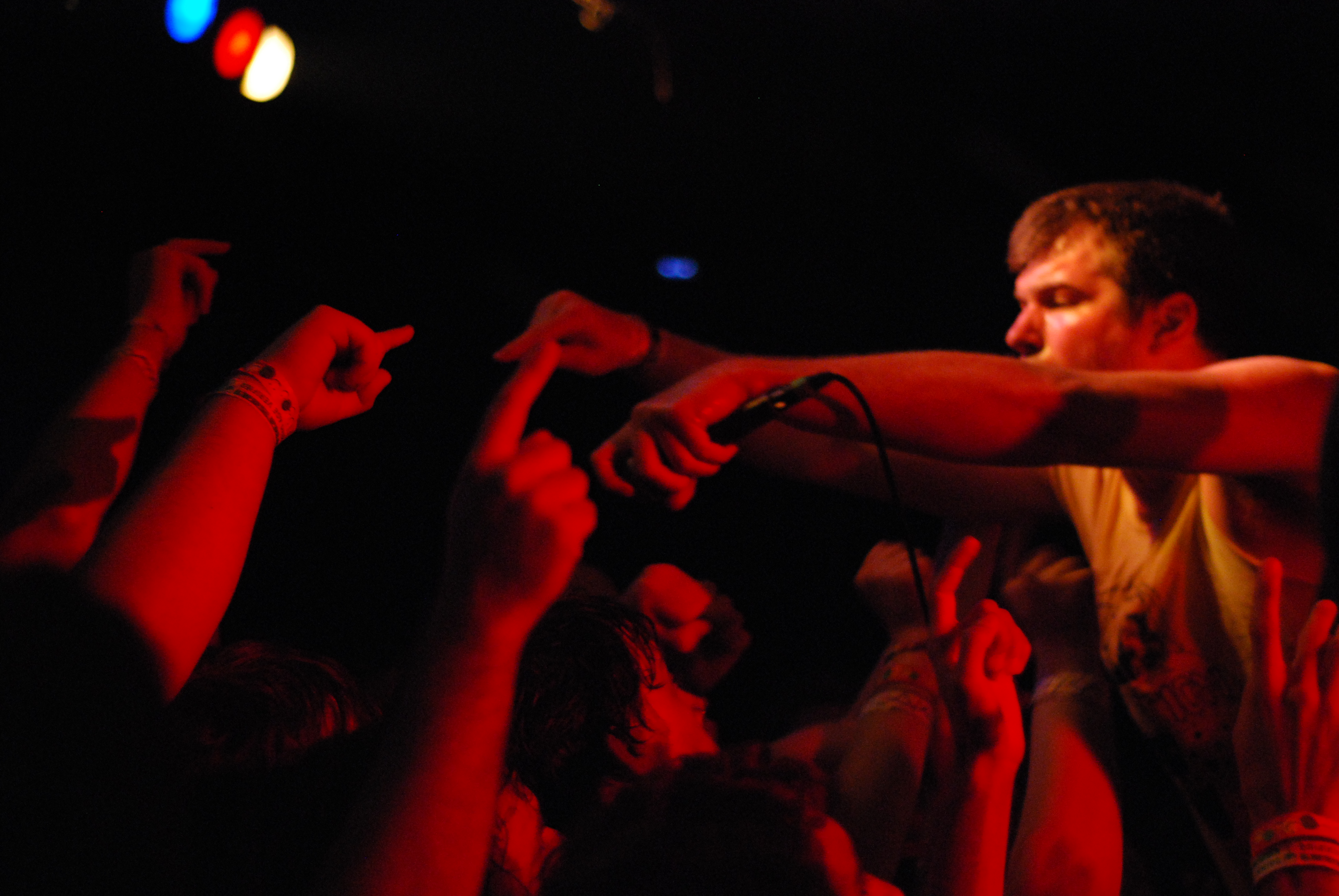
- The Dopamines
- Genre: Punk rock, pop punk, power pop
- Date: Summer
- Frequency: Annual
- Locations: Baltimore, Maryland, United States
- Years active: 2006-2013
- Participants: Musicians
- Organizer: Insubordination Records

Insubordination Fest was an American annual punk rock music festival held in Baltimore, Maryland, that usually took place over three days, in late June.

The festival started in 2006 as a tenth-anniversary showcase for Insubordination Records, and has been held every summer since. In the past, the festival has been headlined by bands such as Dillinger Four, Less Than Jake, The Mr. T Experience, The Queers and Teenage Bottlerocket.

== Lineups by year ==
=== 2006 ===
- The Apers
- A Study in Her
- The AV Club
- Beatnik Termites
- Big In Japan
- Charlie Brown Gets a Valentine
- The Copyrights
- Delay
- The Ergs!
- Geisha Lightning
- Hot Cops
- Johnie 3
- John Stamos Project
- The Mopes
- Peabodys
- Pea Shooter
- The Proteens
- The Prozacs
- Stabones
- The Steinways
- Sick Sick Birds
- Slaughterhouse 4
- The Tattle Tales
- Team Stray
- Tokyo Super Fans
- The Unlovables
- Vents
- Varsity Wierdos
- Zoinks!

=== 2007 ===
July 5–7, The Sidebar (Thursday) and The Ottobar (Friday and Saturday)

- The Apers
- The AV Club
- Backseat Virgins
- Banner Pilot
- Beatnik Termites
- Ben Weasel
- Big In Japan
- Chinese Telephones
- The Copyrights
- Dead Mechanical
- Dear Landlord
- Egghead
- The Ergs!
- For Science
- The Guts
- Head
- The Hi-Life
- Joe Jitzu
- Karmella's Game
- The Leftovers
- Lemuria
- The Methadones
- Modern Machines
- The Mr. T Experience
- Nancy (band)
- The Paper Dragons
- The Parasites
- Peabodys
- The Proteens
- The Prozacs
- Retarded
- The Riptides
- Short Attention
- Sick Sick Birds
- The Steinways
- The Tattle Tales
- Teenage Bottlerocket
- Team Stray
- The Unlovables
- Varsity Weirdos
- Vena Cava
- Groovie Ghoulies were originally scheduled to play but did not because of the band's break up earlier that year. Head was booked to replace them. Members of the band did, however, appear as guests during The Mr. T Experience set.
- Guff was also originally scheduled to play but did not. Banner Pilot was booked to replace them.
- The God Damn Doo Wop Band was on the final schedule, but did not play.

=== 2008 ===
June 26–28, The Ottobar (Thursday Pre-show), Recher Theatre (Friday) and Sonar (Saturday)

- The 20 Belows
- Agent Orange
- Ann Beretta
- The AV Club
- Backseat Virgins
- Beatnik Termites
- Be My Doppleganger
- Chinese Telephones
- Cletus
- The Copyrights
- The Crumbs
- The Drunken Cholos
- Dateless
- Dead Mechanical
- Dear Landlord
- Ded Bugs
- Deep Sleep
- Doc Hopper
- The Ergs!
- Fear of Lipstick
- Festipals
- For Science
- Full of Fancy
- The Guts
- The Hextalls
- Karmella's Game
- The Leftovers
- Lemuria
- Moral Crux
- Nancy
- Off With Their Heads
- Project 27
- Parasites
- The Proteens
- The Queers
- The Riptides
- The Steinways
- Short Attention
- Sloppy Seconds
- Sludgeworth
- Sweet Baby
- The Tattle Tales
- Teenage Rehab
- Sick Sick Birds
- Team Stray
- Weston
- Zatopeks
- Double Dagger, Clint Maul, Head Home, Sleepwall and The Swims also played at the Toxic Pop/Wallride Records showcase stage at The Talking Head Club inside Sonar.

=== 2009 ===
June 25–27, The Ottobar (Thursday Pre-show) and Sonar (Friday and Saturday)

- The 20 Belows
- The Abducted (reunion)
- The Adorkables
- The Apers
- The AV Club
- The Backseat Virgins
- Banner Pilot
- Be My Doppelganger
- Beatnik Termites
- Boris the Sprinkler
- The Challenged
- Charlie Brown Gets a Valentine
- The Copyrights
- The Cretins
- Dead Mechanical
- The Dead Milkmen
- Dear Landlord
- Deep Sleep
- Dillinger Four
- The Dopamines
- Egghead
- The Fiendz
- The Festipals
- The Firecrackers
- Full of Fancy
- The Gateway District
- Groovie Ghoulies
- The Guts
- The Hextalls
- House Boat
- The Jetty Boys
- John Walsh
- Karmella's Game
- The Kung Fu Monkeys
- Le volume était au maximum
- The Leftovers
- Lemuria
- The Loblaws
- The Marshmallows
- The Max Levine Ensemble
- The Methadones
- One Short Fall
- Pansy Division
- Parasites
- The Proteens
- The Prozacs
- Psyched to Die
- Rational Anthem
- The Repellents
- The Resistors
- The Secretions
- The Serlingtons
- Short Attention
- The Shuttlecocks
- Sick Sick Birds
- The Sidekicks
- Spodie
- Squirtgun
- The Steinways
- Sucidie
- Teenage Bottlerocket
- Teen Idols
- Toys That Kill
- Underground Railroad to Candyland
- The Unlovables

=== 2010 ===
June 24–26, The Ottobar (Thursday Pre-show) and Sonar (Friday and Saturday)

- American Steel
- Automatics
- Be My Doppelganger
- Beatnik Termites
- Black Wine
- Charlie Brown Gets a Valentine
- Chinese Telephones
- Dead Mechanical
- Dear Landlord
- Dirt Bike Annie
- The Dopamines
- The Firecrackers
- Flamingo Nosebleed
- House Boat
- The Huntingtons
- Impulse International
- Jetty Boys
- Kepi Ghoulie and Friends
- Kobanes
- The Leftovers
- Less Than Jake
- Like Bats
- MC Chris
- Max Levine Ensemble
- The Menzingers
- The Methadones
- Nancy
- Night Birds
- Noise by Numbers
- Off with Their Heads
- Pillowfights
- Protagonist
- The Proteens
- The Prozacs
- The Quarantines
- The Queers
- Sandworms
- The Scissors
- Shutouts
- The Side Project
- The Slow Death
- Smokejumper
- Smoking Popes
- The Steinways
- Teenage Bottlerocket
- Tenement
- Varsity Weirdos
- Zatopeks
- The Creeps, Fear Of Lipstick, The Hamiltons, The Hextalls, Old Wives, The PG-13s, The Roman Line and The Visitors also played at the "Canada Invasion Presented by Merman Records" at the Sonar's second stage on Friday.
- Barrakuda McMurder, the recording project of Steinways frontman, Grath Madden, were on the bill, but only as a stand-in for a surprise reunion set by The Steinways.
- The Sidekicks were scheduled to appear for the second year in a row but cancelled the week of the festival and were replaced by Like Bats.
- The Kung Fu Monkeys were originally scheduled to play, but did not.

=== 2011 ===
August 11–13, The Ottobar

- Army Coach
- Be My Doppelganger
- Chixdiggit
- Connie Dungs
- The Copyrights
- Danny Vapid and the Cheats
- Dead Mechanical
- Dear Landlord
- Direct Hit
- The Dopamines
- Fatal Flaw
- The Firecrackers
- House Boat
- Iron Chic
- The Jetty Boys
- Karmella's Game
- Kepi Ghoulie
- Kurt Baker
- The Marshmallows
- Max Levine Ensemble
- Mikey Erg
- Mixtapes
- The Murderburgers
- The Potatomen
- The Quarantines
- Shutouts
- Slow Death
- Sun Puddles
- Vacation
- Young Hasselhoffs

=== 2012 ===
June 21–23, The Ottobar

- Be My Doppelganger
- Beatnik Termites
- Billy Raygun
- Bobby Joe Ebola and the Children MacNuggits
- Braceface
- Candy Hearts
- City Mouse
- The Copyrights
- Dan Vapid and the Cheats
- Dead Mechanical
- Dear Landlord
- Dewtons
- Dopamines
- Dr. Frank and Friends
- Fatal Flaw
- The Firecrackers
- House Boat
- Isotopes
- Lipstick Homicide
- Mean Jeans
- Mikey Erg!
- Mixtapes
- Night Birds
- Parasites
- Plow United
- Promdates
- Rational Anthem
- Slow Death
- Smokejumper
- Teenage Bottlerocket
- Trashkanistan
- The Unlovables
- Weekend Dads
- Weston were originally scheduled to play, but dropped off due to a band member being unable to make it.

=== 2013 ===
June 27–29, The Ottobar

- Beatnik Termites
- The Borderlines
- Candy Hearts
- The Capitalist Kids
- City Mouse
- The Copyrights
- Dan Vapid and the Cheats
- Dead Mechanical
- The Dewtons
- Direct Hit
- Dog Party
- Ex-Friends
- Fatal Flaw
- The Firecrackers
- Flamingo Nosebleed
- The Hellstroms
- Hospital Job
- House Boat
- Isotopes
- Jetty Boys
- Kepi Ghoulie
- Kepi-rights (Kepi Ghoulie with The Copyrights as a backing band)
- Lipstick Homicide
- The Marshmallows
- The Meeps
- Mikey Erg!
- The Mopes
- Night Birds
- Paper Dragons
- Plow United
- The Quarantines
- Rational Antheim
- Schroeder and the Brillo Pad
- Screaming Females
- Sick Sick Birds
- Slow Death
- The Steinways
- Team Stray
- Tight Bros.
- Tonight We Strike
- Trashkanistan

== CD/DVDs ==
During 2007, a live CD/DVD was released compiling various performances from that year's festival. Additionally CD/DVD sets were released compiling the entirety of some bands' set that year including The AV Club, Dead Mechanical, The Guts, The Leftovers, Paper Dragons, Short Attention, The Steinways, Varsity Weirdos and Wimpy Rutherford.

== See also ==
- Culture of Baltimore
- List of punk rock festivals
- List of historic rock festivals
