= Rivethead (disambiguation) =

Rivethead or rivet-head may (aside from the head of a rivet) refer to:

- A rivethead, obsolete (ca. 1940s) slang for an American automotive industry assembly line worker
- A rivethead, in the 1980s a slang for a member of the heavy metal subculture, especially an Iron Maiden fan
- A rivethead, in the 1990s onward, a participant in the subculture surrounding electro-industrial, EBM and industrial rock music
- Rivethead, a punk rock band from Minneapolis, Minnesota on Recess Records in the early 2000s; members went on to form Dear Landlord, Banner Pilot, and Off with Their Heads.
