= Let It Rock =

Let It Rock may refer to:

- Let It Rock (magazine), a British monthly music magazine published between 1972 and 1975
- Sex (boutique), formerly Let It Rock, a London fashion boutique

== Albums ==
- Let It Rock (1973 compilation), an album by Atlantic Records
- Let It Rock (Great White album)
- Let It Rock (Ronnie Hawkins album)
- Let It Rock: The Jerry Garcia Collection, Vol. 2, a 2009 album by the Jerry Garcia Band
- Let It Rock!, an album by The Connection

== Songs ==
- "Let It Rock" (Chuck Berry song) covered by The Rolling Stones, Dave Edmunds, The Wildebeests, Skyhooks
- "Let It Rock" (Kevin Rudolf song), featuring Lil Wayne
- "Let It Rock", a song by Bon Jovi from Slippery When Wet
