= The Dopamines =

American punk rock band

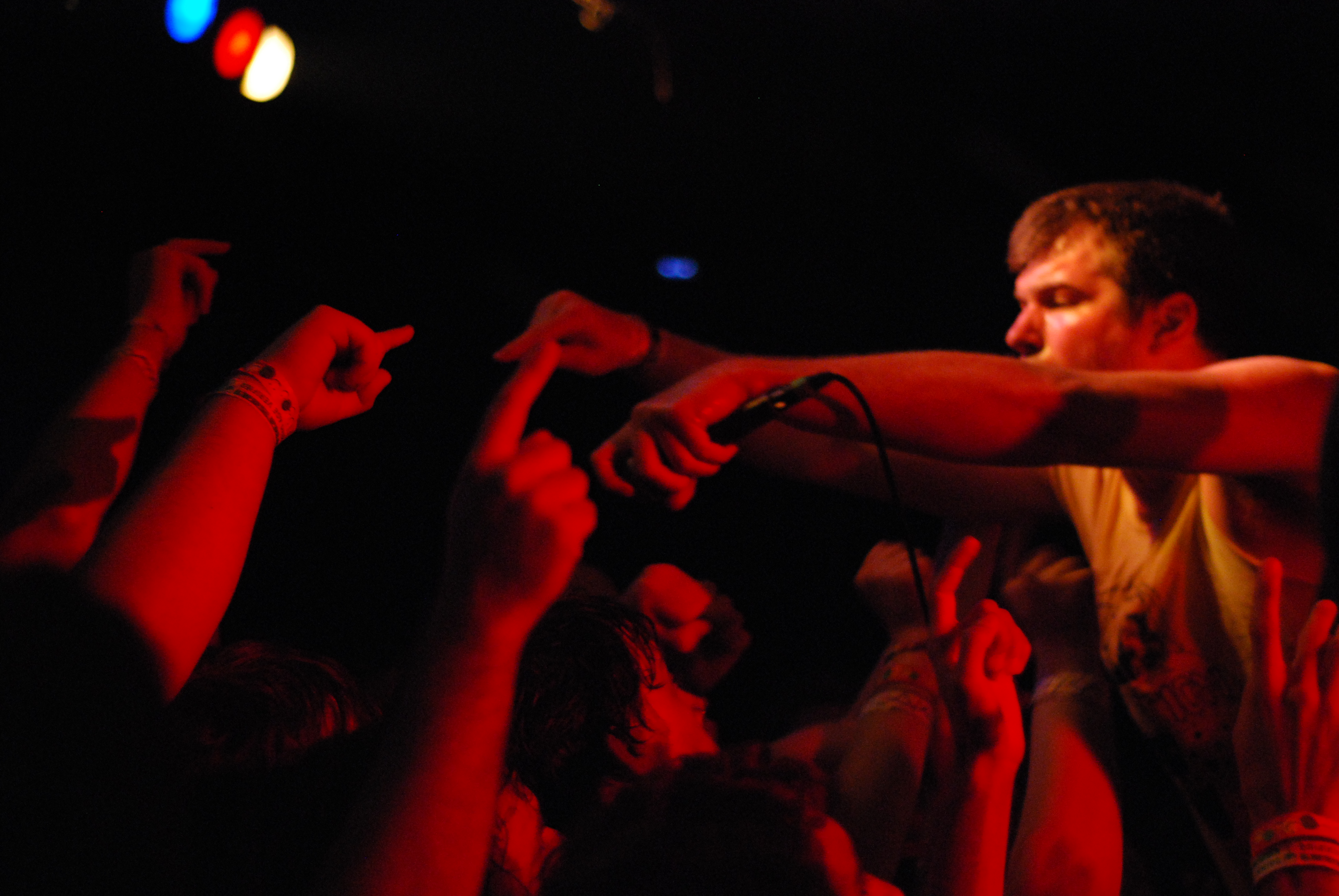
- The Dopamines

Background information
- Origin: Cincinnati, Ohio
- Genre: Punk rock
- Years active: 2006-present
- Labels: Rad Girlfriend Records; It's Alive Records; Paper + Plastick; Bearded Punk Records (EU); Plasterer (UK); Brassneck (UK)
- Members: Michael Dickson; Jon Lewis; Jon Weiner; Josh Goldman
- Past members: Matt Hemingway; Mikey Erg

The Dopamines are an American punk rock band originating from Cincinnati, Ohio, formed in late 2006 by Matt Hemingway (drums), Jon Lewis (guitar, vocals) and Jon Weiner (bass, vocals). In 2008, Hemingway left the band and was replaced by Michael Dickson. Their loud style of punk has been compared to Midwestern punk bands like Dillinger Four.

Occasionally, the band had toured with a second guitarist, including Mikey Erg from The Ergs! Since 2013, Josh Goldman has been the band's second guitarist.

== History ==
Jon Lewis and Matt Hemingway played together in the Cincinnati punk band Black Tie Bombers (which also featured Ryan Rockwell of Mixtapes), while Lewis and Jon Weiner played together in Ukraine Crane. Together they formed The Dopamines and recorded a self-titled album in 2008, which was received positively. The punk-rock fanzine Razorcake described, "…they sound like they're having the times of their lives, playing to a sweaty basement of wigging-out friends. That energy and the precision how they play make this record a fun, strong listen."

Later that year, The Dopamines played Insubordination Fest, in Baltimore, which was part of the band's tour with The Leftovers. At the festival, video crews recorded the band's set, which were later released as a live CD/DVD titled Live From Baltimore.

In 2009, a new song, "My Future's so Bright I Have to Wear Night Vision Goggles", appeared on Volume III of the Traffic Street Records "Dangerous Intersections" 4-way split series along with Todd Congelliere, Apocalypse Meow, and Closet Fairies. Later that year, the band released a split 7-inch with The Copyrights titled "Songs About Fucking Up".

In 2010, the band released its second album "Expect The Worst" on Paper + Plastick Records, and went on tour with Paper + Plastick founder Vinnie Fiorello's band Less Than Jake. The new album was recorded by Less Than Jake guitarist Roger Lima and Teen Idols drummer Matt Yonker, and mixed by Descendents guitarist Stephen Egerton.

In March 2011, the band started recording a new album, produced by Yonker; the album, Vices, was released in June 2012. The band released their fourth album Tales of Interest on Red Girlfriend Records in June 2017.

On June 20th, 2024, Jon Weiner announced he was leaving the band to follow Jesus Christ. The split was amicable.

== Band members ==
Current members

- Jon Lewis- guitar, vocals (2006–present)
- Michael Dickson- drums (2008–present)
- Josh Goldman- guitar (2013–present)

Former members

- Matt Hemingway- drums (2006-2008)
- Jon Weiner- bass, vocals (2006–2024)

Touring members

- Mikey Erg- guitar

== Discography ==
=== Studio albums ===
- Dopamines (2008) (It's Alive Records)
- Expect the Worst (2010) (Paper + Plastick)
- Vices (2012) (It's Alive Records)
- Tales of Interest (2017) (RGF Records US - Bearded Punk Records EU - RGF/Plasterer UK)
- 80/20 (2024) (RGF Records US - Bearded Punk Records EU - RGF/Brassneck UK)

=== Live albums ===
- Live from Baltimore (2009) (Insubordination Records)

=== EPs ===
- Soap And Lampshades (2009) (Cold Feet Records)

=== Splits ===
- Dopamines/Til Plains (2008) (split 7-inch) (It's Alive Records)
- Songs About Fucking Up (2009) (split 7-inch with The Copyrights) (It's Alive Records)
- Portrait Parle (2011) (split 7-inch with Dear Landlord) (Paper + Plastick)

=== Music videos ===
- Public Domain (2010)
- More Chords, Better Value (2012)
- Business Papers (2012)
- 083133 (Ollie's Song) (2019)
- King of Swilling Powers (2019)

=== Compilation appearances ===
- Dangerous Intersections III (2009) (Traffic Street Records)
- The Thing That Ate Larry Livermore (2012) (Adeline Records)
