= Kurt Baker =

Kurt Baker may refer to:

- Kurt Baker (rugby union)
- Kurt Baker (musician)
