= The Manges 'R' Good Enough =

Studio album by The Manges
- Released: October 6, 2001
- Recorded: New York City, New York
- Genre: Pop punk
- Label: Stardumb
- Producer: Tony Kowalski

The Manges chronology
| The Manges 'R' Good Enough (2001) | Go Down (2006) |

The Manges 'R' Good Enough is the debut album recorded by The Manges and was released on October 6, 2001, by Stardumb Records. It was recorded in a studio in New York City with Tony of the Kowalskis. This album includes guest appearances by Joe Queer of The Queers, Kitty Kowalski and Mike 'Vacant Lot'.

== Track listing ==
1. I'm a Monkey
2. Blame Game
3. Elvis Has Left the Building
4. I'll Take You to Hawaii
5. I Hate Rats
6. 80s Soldier
7. Kids Are at the Mall
8. Miss Evil
9. Now or Never
10. The Goonies 'R' Good Enough
11. Rumble in Chinatown
12. Yeah (Late Nite Song)

== Credits ==
- Vocals, Guitar – Andrea Caredda
- Bass – Massimo Zannoni
- Drums – Manuel Cossu
- Lead Guitar [Additional] – Mike "Vacant Lot" Hoffman
- Lead Guitar, Rhythm Guitar – Steve Boltz
- Mastered By – Tony 'Guru' Kowalski
- Producer – Tony 'Guru' Kowalski
- Recorded and Mixed By – Forrest Hart, Tony 'Guru' Kowalski
