= Gateway District =

Gateway District may refer to:

- Alaska Gateway School District, which coverers the eastern interior of Alaska
- Gateway Regional School District (Massachusetts)
- Gateway District (Minneapolis), Minnesota, United States
- The Gateway (Salt Lake City), Utah, United States
- The Gateway District, a pop punk band from Minneapolis, Minnesota

== See also ==
- Gateway (disambiguation)
