= Acid Beaters =

Studio album (split) by The Queers/Manges
- Released: November 4, 2003
- Genre: Pop punk
- Label: Stardumb Records

Professional ratings
Review scores
Source	Rating
AllMusic	3/5 stars

Acid Beaters is a split album featuring American pop punk band The Queers and Italian pop punk band the Manges. The album's title is a play on words of the Ramones album Acid Eaters.

== Track listing ==
1. "Chewy Chewy"- The Queers
2. "Ft. Lauderdale" – The Queers
3. "Girl About Town" – The Queers
4. "Sunday Morning" – The Queers
5. "Wipeout" – The Queers
6. "With a Girl Like You" – The Queers
7. "Frontline" – Manges
8. "Surrender" – Manges
9. "Barrage of Hate" – Manges
10. "Saving Private Pierson" – Manges
11. "I Don't Wanna Live in Hell" – Manges
12. "Morphine" – Manges
