= Even in Blackouts =

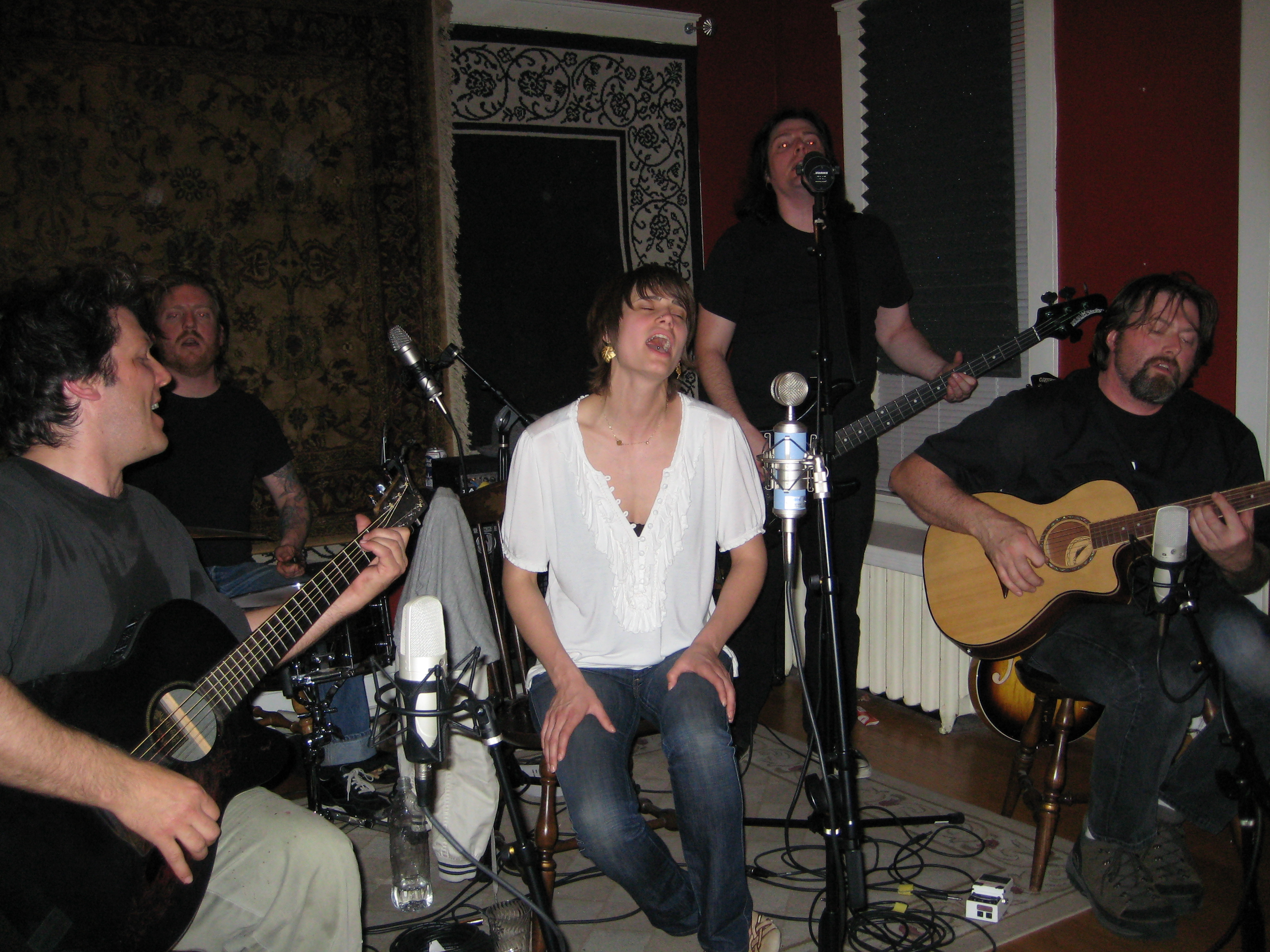

Background information
- Origin: Chicago, Illinois
- Genre: Punk rock
- Years active: 2002—2009, 2017—Present
- Label: Lookout!
- Members: John 'Jughead' Pierson, Liz Eldredge
- Past members: Phillip Hill; Dan Lumley; Scott Conway; Bice; Dan Lipman; Brad Lipman; James Anthony Gilbert
- Website: eveninblackouts.blogspot.com

Even in Blackouts, known occasionally by the acronym EiB, are an acoustic pop-punk band from Chicago, Illinois. The band was formed in 2002 by veteran pop-punk guitarist John 'Jughead' Pierson following the demise of the punk band Screeching Weasel, for which Pierson had performed since 1986. The core of the band is formed by lead vocalist Liz Eldredge and Pierson, although a number of additional musicians have performed with the band. Even in Blackouts have been lauded by critics and fans alike for their musicianship and sense of innovation in bringing pop-punk to a new format. The energy and intimacy of Even in Blackout's live performances have attracted particular acclaim.

== History ==
The story supposedly begins in Sicily, where guitarist and "punk rock renaissance man" John 'Jughead' Pierson had been visiting his friends in the Italian band, The Manges, following the dissolution of his previous band Screeching Weasel. Pierson rented a flat in Palermo with the intention of relaxing, but could not stay away from music. There he wrote the song "Missing Manifesto". He decided to create the world's first acoustic pop-punk band, and called it "Even in Blackouts" in reference to their capability to perform without electricity.

Once back in Chicago, Pierson set about recruiting a group of younger musicians to fill out the band, including Eldredge as lead vocalist. Producer Mass Giorgini discovered Eldredge outside Sonic Iguana Recording Studio, where she had been waiting for some friends to finish recording, and Giorgini introduced her to Pierson.

Pierson had initially intended for the band only to perform live, a reflex reaction perhaps to the studio-bound fate of Screeching Weasel, which didn't play a live show between 1994 and late 2000. But in late 2002, EiB released its debut record, Myths & Imaginary Magicians. The album was originally released on Pierson's own label, limited to 2,000 copies, and sold exclusively through online independent music store Interpunk. When fans of Screeching Weasel heard of the album, they bought up all of the available copies and Pierson re-released the album with Lookout! Records in March 2003. The album featured covers of Screeching Weasel's "Hey Suburbia," Operation Ivy's "Knowledge" and Yazoo's "Only You".

In December 2008, Pierson announced the band will be breaking up, with their last show being March 14, 2009, being held in his basement.

At a party in 2017, they talked about getting back together for a new album. They spent the next two years working on "Romantico!", releasing it to the public on May 3, 2019.

== Members ==
- Liz Eldredge, lead vocals (2002–current)
- John Jughead, guitar (2002–current)
- Scott "Gub" Conway, guitar (2006–current)
- Phillip Hill, bass (2006–current)
- Bice, drums (2004–current)
- Dan Lipman, guitar (2002–2005)
- Brad Lipman, bass guitar (2002–2005)
- Dan Lumley, drums (2002–2004)
- James Anthony Gilbert "Kelly Summers" [guitar, vocals] (2002-2003)

== Discography ==
Albums
Year	Title	Label	Other information
2002	Myths and Imaginary Magicians	Lookout!	Originally self-released by Jughead, the album was re-issued in 2003 by Lookout! Includes covers of "Hey Suburbia" by Screeching Weasel, "Knowledge" by Operation Ivy, and "Only You" by Yazoo
2005	Zeitgeist's Echo	Knock Knock	A darker and more ambitious record than its poppier predecessor. Includes a cover of the '60s hit "One Fine Day" by The Chiffons
2006	The Fall of the House of Even	For Documentation Only Recordings	Released on October 31, 2006. Contains covers of "I Can See Clearly Now" by Johnny Nash and Little Trip To Heaven by Tom Waits.
2009	Thresholds From The Basement	Little Mafia Records	Released on April 5, 2009. Contains a cover of "Randy Scouse Git" by The Monkees .
2019	ROMANTICO!	Stardumb Records	Released on May 3, 2019. Released on CD, Black Vinyl, and Pink/Yellow marbled Vinyl .

EPs
Year	Title	Label	Other information
2003	Foreshadows on the Wall	Knock Knock	Six song EP featuring many songs that were later re-recorded for Zeitgeist's Echo. Includes a cover of "Every Night" by Screeching Weasel
