= The Copyrights =

American pop punk band

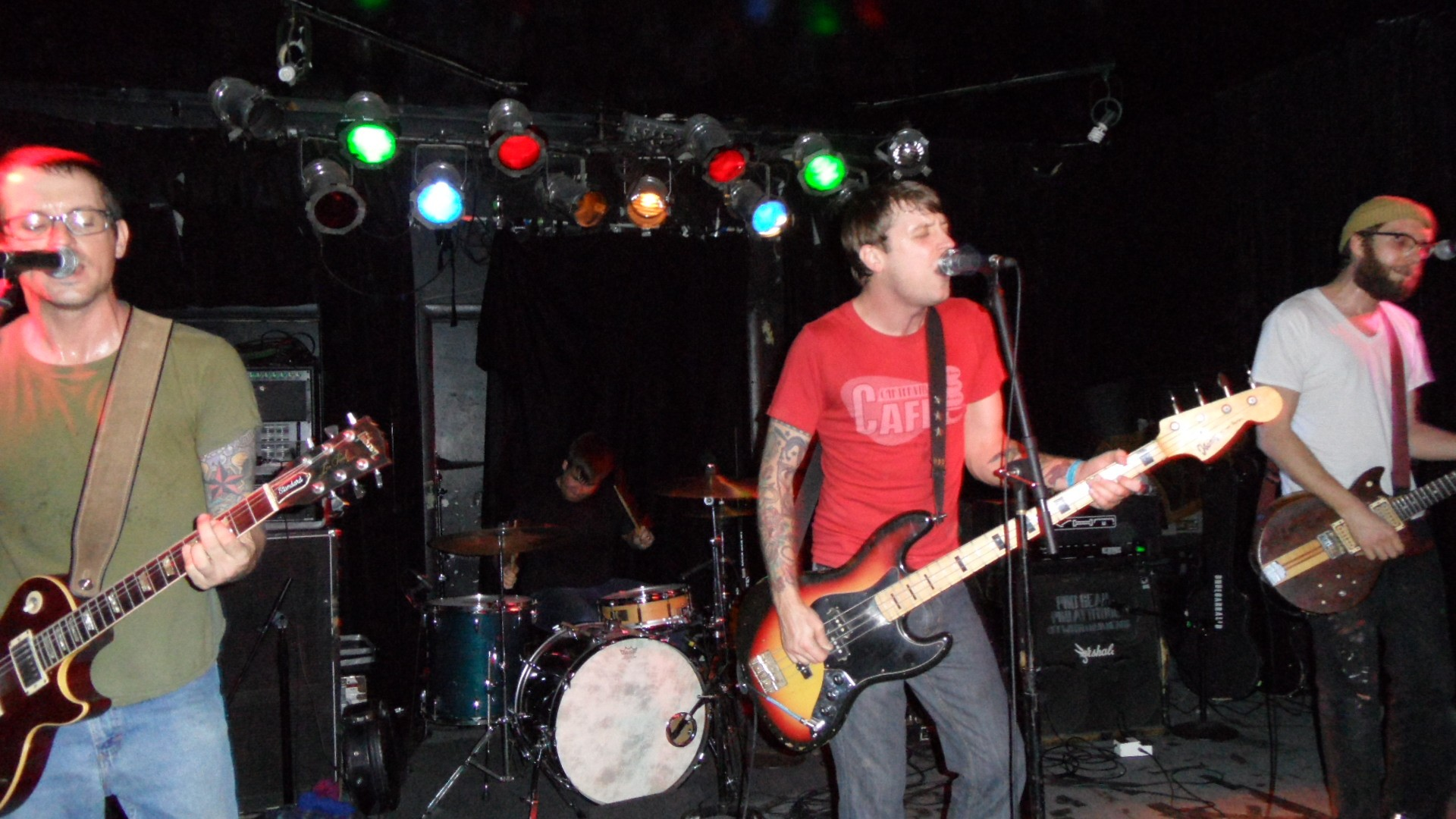
- The Copyrights performing in Chicago in 2013

Background information
- Origin: Carbondale, Illinois
- Genres: Pop-punk; punk rock
- Years active: 2002–present
- Labels: Insubordination; It's Alive; Red Scare Industries; Transparent; No Idea; Fat Wreck Chords
- Members: Adam Fletcher; Brett Hunter; Luke McNeill; Kevin Rotter
- Past members: Jeff Funburg; Ken Clifford; Nick O'Neal; Justin Telephone
- Website: The Copyrights

The Copyrights are a pop-punk band from Carbondale, Illinois, made up of Adam Fletcher (lead vocals, bass), Brett Hunter (vocals, guitar), Kevin Rotter (vocals, guitar), and Luke McNeill (drums). They are currently signed to Fat Wreck Chords. They are known for what Alternative Press calls "both the sloppy, slacker pop-punk of, say, early Green Day with the slightly more polished sheen of Teenage Bottlerocket or recent Bouncing Souls".

== History ==
The Copyrights were formed in 2002 in Carbondale, Illinois. Before long, the punk scene was "buzzing about these kids from southern Illinois redefining pop punk with fun lyrics, big hooks, and infectious choruses that you couldn't help but sing along with."

In 2003 they released their first album, We Didn't Come Here to Die, which was produced by Mass Giorgini. Their next album, Mutiny Pop, was released in 2006. When Make Sound was released in 2007, Punknews.org, a respected source for news of all things punk, called them "one of pop-punk's finest bands". Learn the Hard Way followed in 2008. Independent entertainment periodical Verbicide called the band's fifth effort, North Sentinel Island, released in 2011, a "deeper-than-usual slice of power-punk."

Leading up to their next full-length album, the band issued the No Knocks EP on Fat Wreck Chords, a release New Noise Magazine called "a continuation of the same great quality pop punk that The Copyrights have been delivering for over 12 years now." In their review, Alternative Press stated the difficult task of writing catchy music is one "Illinois pop-punk four-piece the Copyrights have mastered throughout the past decade since their humble beginnings." The band's next album, Report, was released August 26, 2014, on Red Scare Industries. Vice imprint Noisey called the album "the stuff that keeps pop punk alive. The good pop punk, anyway."

In 2019, the group released a collaboration with Kepi Ghoulie of the Groovie Ghoulies, an entirely redone version of the classic Ghoulies' album Re-animation Festival. Referencing her personal connection to the original album in her review for Razorcake, Kayla Greet said "this re-imagining of one of my favorite records actually makes me like The Copyrights more."

The band has toured with the likes of Kepi Ghoulie, Masked Intruder, The Falcon and Teenage Bottlerocket. In 2012, the band played the premier Belgium rock festival, Groezrock. Over the years, The Copyrights have had headlining slots at festivals like Baltimore's Insubordination Fest, Bergamo, Italy's Punk Rock Raduno and Gainesville's The Fest.

In August 2021, it was announced the band had signed with Fat Wreck Chords and would be releasing their seventh studio album, Alone In A Dome in October of that year. Punknews.org gave the album four stars out of five.

== Other projects ==
Several other notable punk acts feature members of The Copyrights:

- The Heat Tape
- No Idea Records' Dear Landlord
- It's Alive Records' Hospital Job
- Rad Girlfriend Records' Starter Jackets

Guitarist Brett Douglas Hunter is also a burgeoning name in the Nashville art scene, where gallery owner Julia Martin told The Tennessean his work "evokes pure joy from everyone that comes in contact with it".

== Discography ==
=== Studio albums ===
- We Didn't Come Here to Die (2003) (Insubordination Records)
- Mutiny Pop (2006) (Insubordination Records)
- Make Sound (2007) (Red Scare Industries)
- Learn the Hard Way (2008) (Red Scare Industries)
- North Sentinel Island (2011) (Red Scare Industries)
- Report (2014) (Red Scare Industries)
- Alone in a Dome (2021) (Fat Wreck Chords)

=== EPs ===
- Button Smasher (2004) (It's Alive Records)
- Nowhere Near Chicago (2005) (It's Alive Records)
- Chicago Smasher (2009) (It's Alive Records)
- ”Dead Flowers” b/w “Carmelita” (2009) (Art of the Underground)
- Crutches (2011) (It's Alive Records)
- No Knocks (2014) (Fat Wreck Chords)
- New Ghosts (2024) (Fat Wreck Chords)

=== Splits ===
- Handclaps & Bottlecaps (acoustic split with Zatopeks) (2006) (It's Alive Records)
- The Methadones/The Copyrights Split (2008) (Transparent)
- Songs About Fucking Up (2009) (split 7-inch with The Dopamines) (It's Alive Records)
- The Copyrights/The Brokedowns split 7-inch (2009) (No Idea Records)
- The Copyrights/Grey Area/The Reveling//Luther split 7-inch (2011) (Black Numbers Records)
- The Copyrights/Kepi Ghoulie Observation Wagon (2019) (Red Scare Industries [US], Stardumb Records [Europe/UK])

=== Compilations ===
- Shit's Fucked (2013) (It's Alive Records) (collects singles & compilation tracks from 2004 to 2010)

=== Live albums ===
- Live in Italy 2019 (2020) (self released)
