= Prozac (disambiguation) =

Prozac is a proprietary name for the antidepressant drug fluoxetine.

Prozac or similar permutations may also refer to:

- Prozac+, an Italian punk band
- Prozak (rapper), American rapper
- Prozzäk, a Canadian pop band
- The Prozacs, American musical group
- "Prosac", a 1996 single by Tomcraft

== See also ==
- Prozac Nation (book), a memoir by Elizabeth Wurtzel published in 1994
  - Prozac Nation (film), a 2001 film based around the book
