= The Prozacs =

American punk rock band

- Origin: Westfield, Massachusetts
- Genres: Pop punk, punk rock
- Years active: 2001–present
- Labels: Outloud! Records, Cheapskate Records, Cabana 1 Records, Pop-A-Pill Records, Knowhere Records, Irresponsible Records, No Breaks Records, Water slide Records, Voodoo Doll Records, Jerk off Records, This Is Just A Record Label, River Monster Records, Punkerton Records
- Members: Jay Gauvin; Jimmy Craig; Greg Russian; Michael Grover

The Prozacs are an American punk rock / pop punk band formed in 2001 by Jay Gauvin (aka J Prozac) in Westfield, Massachusetts, and has toured nationally and internationally and has appeared at events such as Insubordination Fest and Vans Warped Tour, Germany's Puke Fest and Italian Festivals Punk Rock Raduno and Metapalooza Fest. The band has released five studio albums and several splits, EP'S and compilation albums on various independent labels.

== History ==
The band formed in September 2001 as a side project of Jay Gauvin of The GrandPrixx. The original line up of Jay on guitar and vocals, Kevin Bouvier of Honkey Dorey on guitar, Matt Santos of Honkey Dorey on drums and Dave Nocrasz on bass and vocals, lasted only three months. This line up wrote nine songs together and played three shows. By spring of 2002, Dave moved to guitar, Colin Vicalvi joined on bass and Justin Cohen on drums. This lasted until July, then the band recorded a 16-song demo near Cleveland Ohio with Ralf Vermin (of the Ohio band The Vermin) on drums. Marty Beach who was in "The GrandPrixx" with Jay joined on drums in September 2002, rounding out the first steady lineup of The Prozacs. (In an interesting side note, Marty was intended to be the original drummer in September 2001 and attended and jammed at the very first practice, but in a weird circumstance, Matt Santos was also there and wound up being chosen)

The band's first album, Thanks For Nothing, was recorded in the fall of 2002 and released on May 16, 2003. September 2003, Marty and Dave left the band, shortly after completing an East Coast tour with The Vents and several high-profile shows, including New England's Skate Fest. Glenn Robinson and Pete Camera of Irresponsible Records label mate band The Paranoids joined on drums and guitar. In April 2004 the Monsters Night Out CDEP was recorded, followed by Glenn and Pete's departure, and released in August 2004 on Cheapskate Records. A North East USA tour with Darlington and Johnie 3 in the band's first incarnation as a three-piece, with Mike Allan on drums took place in August 2004. Mike left in September and Justin Cohen returned on drums for the remainder of 2004. The band released a split 7-Inch with Johnie 3 in early 2005 entitled Turntable Not Included, featuring Justin Cohen on drums. In January 2005, Matty Prozac joined on drums, Karl Ourand on guitar and sometimes bass, and that spring, a live album was recorded at CBGB in New York City.

Sean Watson replaced Colin on bass in mid 2005. The band released the Odds N' Ends 7-inch, Summer Sounds four-way split and a split CD with Johnie 3 entitled We Should Split. The band toured the East Coast and Midwest and played constantly through 2005 and 2006, including playing the Ernie Ball stage at Vans Warped Tour in Northampton, Massachusetts, the first Insubordination Fest in Baltimore in 2006 and tours with The Apers and Johnie 3. Insub Fest would be Karl's last show with the band, being briefly replaced by Andrew Strikeout in the fall of 2006 on guitar before going on as a three-piece again.

By March 2007 the Pieces 7-inch and the band's sophomore album Questions, Answers, And Things Never Found were released, followed by the release of Stickin' With It, a split with New Hampshire punk band The Guts. Sean left the band after 2007s summer Midwest/East Coast tours with Johnie 3, including Insub Fest 2007 where Ben Weasel listed The Prozacs in the top 10 performers of that year on the Fat Wreck Chords website. Jed Dion of the Western Mass band No Intention briefly joined on guitar in the fall of 2007, followed by the brief return Coliano Prozac on bass for a couple months before being replaced by Bernie Nobody in December 2007 for the band's third album, Playing The Chords We Love, which began recording in the spring of 2008 and released on CD by Cheapskate Records in December 2008 and LP by Knowhere Records and No Breaks Records in 2009. In the spring of 2008, J Prozac proposed to his then fiancé Andy Nihilate, who frequently guest sang at shows and on albums, on stage, mid song during a performance at a local venue filled with friends, family and Andy's roller derby team. Matty Prozac and Bernie left the band prior to the album's completion and release in mid 2008.

Jimmy Craig and Adam Taylor joined the band on drums and bass in mid 2008 and this new trio supported the release of Playing The Chords We Love and recorded a split 7-inch with the Canadian band McRackins called Somebody Out There Loves Us. Adam briefly left the band in 2009, being replaced by Pete Martone on bass, before returning a few months later, with the addition of Rob Sarno on guitar. Sporadic weekend tours and shows were played in 2009 throughout 2011 with the line up of J Prozac, Jimmy Craig, Adam Taylor and Rob Sarno. This era occasionally saw Matty Prozac filling in on drums, including at Insubordination Fest 2010 and Knowhere Fest in Michigan. The band did a week long tour in the fall of 2009 with Las Vegas band Murder Majesty, including shows in Las Vegas, Arizona and New Mexico, as a 3-piece, with Matty Prozac on drums and touring bassist Bill Crumpton. During this era with Jimmy Craig on drums, Adam Taylor on bass and Rob Sarno on guitar, the band released a split CD with Italian punk band Super White Garlic, entitled Broken Smiles, a split 7-inch with No Intention called Another Bright Idea and the Cleaning Out The Closet collection album. Rob Sarno left the band in the fall 2011, leaving the trio of J Prozac, Jimmy Craig and Adam Taylor once again.

In the spring/summer of 2012, J Prozac was in the process of recording his debut solo album Here is My Heart, as well as writing new material, outside of The Prozacs with ex-drummer Matty Prozac and friend Rocco on bass, initially called J Prozac and The Other Guys but only lasting five practices before halting. Jon Kane joined on for the last couple practices of The Other Guys before joining on guitar with The Prozacs that summer. Adam Taylor left the band in the fall of 2012 and was replaced by John Novak on bass. Jimmy Craig left the band at the end of 2012, with Matty joining back on drums officially for the first time since 2008. Going into 2013, the new line up of J Prozac, Matty Prozac, Jon Kane and John Novak lasted only five months and released a split 7-inch with Chicago band The Kobanes featuring the song Dancing Larry as tribute to WMASS legend Larry Howes. The song was originally written by J Prozac with Jimmy Craig on drums as Larry was an important figure and friend to both of them for nearly 2 decades.

During The Prozacs downtime after the Matty, Jon and John lineup disbanding in the spring of 2013, J Prozac was working remotely with Bil McRackin of the Vancouver, Canada band McRackins. After months of trading demos and writing collaborations, J flew to Vancouver for a week in the summer of 2013 to hit the studio with Bil to record what would become the album Doubtfire.

Jimmy and Adam returned to The Prozacs in June 2013, with Adam again leaving for good in November. In January 2014, J Prozac and Jimmy Craig started J Prozac & The Stilettos with Jeff & Scott Blood of The Uncomfortables / Pajama Slave Dancers and J's wife Andy Nihilate in order to promote and perform J's solo album, Prozacs material and future ventures. This line up eventually became Stiletto Bomb. The idea was to move away from being The Prozacs, so Jimmy and J contributed songs as Stiletto Bomb that were initially headed for the next Prozacs album. The band performed live with a mix of Prozacs, J Prozac and new songs as Stiletto Bomb. The Prozacs collection CD Is This How It Ends? was released in 2014 to serve as closure of the band and features the recordings of the band between 2009 - 2013.

With Jimmy on drums and Stiletto Bomb pulling away from playing J Prozac and The Prozacs material, J began playing live and writing again with Matty Prozac on drums and performing both as J Prozac or The Prozacs with Paul Basile joining on bass. Paul left the band in August 2014 and was replaced by Nic Cross of Nice Try Kid thru December 2014. In early 2014, J, Matty and Paul entered the studio to record the J Prozac single Jessica Is Getting Married along with rough tracks for 8 other songs that were left incomplete. During the second half of 2014 with Nic on bass, the idea was to rebrand The Prozacs as The Sonic Diffusers or J Prozac & The Sonic Diffusers but the name change did not stick with performances still booked as J Prozac and new material written and recorded during these incarnations headed for future Prozacs releases. In November 2014 Stiletto Bomb entered the studio to record the In The Dark EP but Jimmy Craig was replaced by Matty Prozac on drums before its release in July 2015.

From January - September 2015 The Prozacs were on hiatus without a lineup other than J. While not an active band in that time, J and Paul finished up 2 songs from a previous recording session for a split seven inch record, this time with Texas pop punker Darlington that was released in 2015. In September 2015 The Prozacs returned for a one-off show with J Prozac, Jimmy Craig and Paul Basile. In the following weeks Matty Prozac came back to the band on drums along with Paul on bass and Nic Cross on lead guitar. The band picked up where it left off in 2014 with new material in the works and put focus on completing a new full-length album. In 2016 a six-song EP titled A Little Something was released on Outloud & Pop-A-Pill Records. The songs on the EP were the completed recordings from the Jessica Is Getting Married sessions. The band entered the studio in early 2016 to begin recording their 4th (and first since 2008) studio album Exist. In November the band celebrated its 15-year Anniversary with a local show along with Stiletto Bomb and the 30 year hometown reunion of Pajama Slave Dancers. By January 2017, Matty and Nic had left the band and Jimmy Craig joined back on drums. Nic Cross joined back in August 2017 for the release of "Exist" on Outloud Records.

Throughout 2017, Jay and Jimmy worked on new material, entering the studio in January 2018 to record a tribute song of the Italian band The Manges. Also recorded was the material that became a split 7-inch with fellow Massachusetts band Marko & The Bruisers and the band's 5th studio album Ambivalence, which was released in the summer of 2019 on Outloud Records. During 2017/2018 the band line up was mainly Jay and Jimmy, with Paul Basile and Nic Cross mainly serving as the live band, but not much involved in the writing of Ambivalence. Matty Prozac would occasionally fill in on drums or join the band on stage as an additional backing vocalist. Lincoln Zinzola of the Massachusetts youth punk band Color Killer would also make frequent appearances on stage with the band. The band performed many regional and East Coast shows in 2018, including with The Queers, Huntingtons, The F.U.'s, Beatnik Termites and the Hartford, CT Vans Warped Tour.

Near the end of 2018, Paul and Nic both left the band with Matty Prozac officially back, but this time on bass. The trio of J Prozac, Jimmy Craig and Matty Prozac, the longest standing members in the band's history, along with Andy Nihilate of Stiletto Bomb on vocals as well, traveled to Germany in January 2019 to play Puke Fest with Beatnik Termites, Zatopeks, Chromosomes, Sewer Rats and more. Two other shows were also played in Germany and Netherlands with Burger Weekends, The Hawaiians and The Evil O'Brians. A small run of shows followed that spring in Tennessee, Indiana and Ohio with St. Louis band The Radio Buzzkills.

Late spring 2019, Jed Dion of No Intention, who was briefly in the band in 2007, joined on guitar once again. J and Jimmy entered the studio in June with 7 new songs with no set destination. The band performed an album release show for Ambivalence which included guest appearances by J Prozacs children and Andy Nihilate for a 6-song Stiletto Bomb set performed with The Prozacs. October 2019, Matty Prozac was replaced on bass by Kyle Carnage of New Hampshire's The Labor Pains. The band continued to play shows as well as preparing a set of Screeching Weasel, The Mopes and Even In Blackouts songs for a show in Boston as the backing band for John Jughead Pierson of the mentioned bands, along with other guests like B-Face of The Mopes, Bice of Even In Blackouts and Andy Nihilate. Unfortunately the worldwide pandemic that shut everything down in March 2020 preventing the show from happening.

For most of 2020 and into the summer of 2021, no shows were played as the pandemic was in effect. In September 2020 J connected with original Prozacs drummer Marty Beach and friend Lou Smith of Albany, NY band Lurking Class to start a new side project, once again under the name Sonic Diffuser. In February 2021, Marty and J entered the studio with 4 new songs and a cover. 4 of these songs became combined with the 7 songs J and Jimmy began recording in 2019 to complete what would become J Prozacs second solo album Won't Let Go for Rum Bar Records on CD and River Monster Records on LP, released in 2022. The last song went to a compilation as Sonic Diffuser.

In the summer of 2021 The Prozacs entered the studio and recorded the new song Blah, Blah, Blah as the new track for the band's 20 Year Anniversary career spanning release Fan Favs And Wannabe Hits and the only recording to feature the J, Jimmy, Jed and Kyle lineup. After getting back to live shows in August 2021 and playing around New England and the East Coast, Kyle Carnage left the band in December 2021 and was replaced by local bassist Greg Russian of Trash Mammals.

In October 2021 J Prozac, Marty Beach and Lou Smith went into the studio to record 2 covers of The Lillingtons to be released as J Prozac and 3 more originals for Sonic Diffuser. During 2022 to celebrate 20 years since the original Prozacs demos were recorded, This Is Just A Record Label released Welcome To Camp Cheerful. This is the original 16 song demo recorded live in Ohio in 2002 featuring J Prozac, Coliano Prozac, Dave Nocrasz and Ralf Vermin.

Throughout 2022 and 2023 the band played shows all over New England, the East Coast and Mid-West while enlisting several fill in players along the way. In August 2023 the We Scream EP was released with Outloud Records consisting of the recordings done initially for Sonic Diffuser, but once again the project never got off the ground and was absorbed by The Prozacs.

== Band members ==
Jay Prozac (current)
Jimmy Craig (current)
Adam Taylor
Matty Prozac
Jon Kane
John Novak
Rob Sarno
Dave Nocrasz
Kevin Bouvier
Matt Santos
Coliano Prozac
Justin Accident
Ralf Vermin
Marty Beach
Glenn Robinson
Pete Camera
Mike Allen
Karl Ourand
Sean Chin-nuts
Andrew Strikeout
Jed Intention
Bernie Nobody
Paul Basile
Nic Cross
Pete Martone
Kyle Carnage
Greg Russian (current)
Matt Futon
Michael Grover (current)

== Discography ==
=== Studio albums ===
- Thanks For Nothing CD (2003)
- Questions, Answers, And Things Never Found CD (2007)
- Playing The Chords We Love CD/LP(2008)
- Exist CD (2017)
- Ambivalence CD/LP (2019)

=== EPs ===
- Monsters Night Out CDEP (2004)
- Odds N' Ends 7-inch (2006)
- Pieces 7-inch (2007)
- A Little Something CDEP (2016)
- We Scream CDEP (2023)
- No Way Out 7-inch (2025)

=== Live albums ===
- Live At CBGB (2005)
- Welcome To Camp Cheerful (2022)

=== Compilation albums ===
- Cleaning Out The Closet (2010)
- Is This How It Ends? (2014)
- Fan Favs And Wannabe Hits! (2021)

=== Splits ===
- Prozacs/Johnie 3 7-inch (2005)
- Summer Sounds 4 Band Split CD (2005)
- Prozacs/Johnie 3 CD (2006)
- Prozacs/The Guts 7-inch (2007)
- McRackins/Prozacs 7-inch (2009)
- Prozacs/Super White Garlic CD (2010)
- Prozacs/ No Intention 7-inch (2011)
- Prozacs/Kobanes 7-inch (2013)
- Prozacs/Darlington 7-inch (2015)
- Prozacs/Marko and the Bruisers 7-inch (2018)
- Prozacs/Downstrokes 12-inch/CD (2024)
