= Heart Beats Pacific =

Studio album by Banner Pilot
- Released: October 25, 2011
- Recorded: June–July, 2011; The Terrarium, Minneapolis
- Genre: Punk rock, pop punk
- Length: 36:45
- Label: Fat Wreck Chords
- Producer: Jacques Wait

Banner Pilot chronology
Collapser (2009)	Heart Beats Pacific (2011)	Souvenir (2014)

Professional ratings
Review scores
Source	Rating
Punknews.org	4/5 stars
Sputnikmusic	4.5/5 stars
Scene Point Blank	7.8/10 stars

Heart Beats Pacific is the third studio album by the American punk band Banner Pilot. The album was recorded in June and July 2011 and was then released by Fat Wreck Chords on CD and LP on October 25 the same year. Heart Beats Pacific is the second studio album by Banner Pilot on this label.

== Track listing ==
1. "Alchemy" – 2:15
2. "Forty Degrees" – 2:15
3. "Red Line" – 3:11
4. "Spanish Reds" – 3:28
5. "Eraser" – 2:50
6. "Expat" – 3:55
7. "Isolani" – 3:12
8. "Calling Station" – 3:23
9. "Western Terminal" – 3:32
10. "Intervention" – 3:43
11. "Division Street" – 5:05

== Performers ==
- Nick Johnson - vocals, guitar
- Nate Gangelhoff - guitar, bass
- Corey Ayd - guitar, vocals
- Dan Elston-Jones - drums
