= Resignation Day =

Studio album by Banner Pilot
- Released: August 12, 2008
- Genre: Punk rock
- Length: 30:43
- Label: Go-Kart Records

Banner Pilot chronology
Banner Pilot / Monikers (2007)	Resignation Day (2008)	Collapser (2009)

Resignation Day is the first album released by Banner Pilot. The record was originally released in 2008, but due to the original album being mastered improperly, it was remixed and re-released with two extra tracks in 2010 on Fat Wreck Chords. The track 'Wired Wrong' features a spoken word part taken from The Subterraneans by Jack Kerouac.

== Track listing ==
1. "Overwinter" - 2:04
2. "Cut Bait" - 1:49
3. "Speed Trap" - 2:16
4. "Empty Your Bottles" - 1:48
5. "Saltash Luck" - 2:53
6. "Wired Wrong" - 3:45
7. "Baltimore Knot" - 2:33
8. "Absentee" - 2:15
9. "Milemarking" - 2:46
10. "Shell Game" - 2:52
11. "No Transfer" - 2:17
12. "Barker" - 3:25
