= Souvenir (Banner Pilot album) =

Studio album by Banner Pilot
- Released: April 15, 2014
- Recorded: October–December, 2013; The Terrarium, Minneapolis
- Genre: Punk rock, pop punk
- Length: 38:52
- Label: Fat Wreck Chords
- Producer: Jacques Wait

Banner Pilot chronology
Heart Beats Pacific (2011)	Souvenir (2014)

Professional ratings
Review scores
Source	Rating
Alternative Press	4/5 stars
Sputnikmusic	3.5/5 stars
Cryptic Rock	3/5 stars

Souvenir is the fourth studio album by the American punk band Banner Pilot. Souvenir was recorded in October–December 2013 and released on April 15, 2014 by Fat Wreck Chords on LP and CD. It is the third studio album by Banner Pilot on this label.

== Track listing ==
1. "Modern Shakes" – 2:29
2. "Effigy" – 2:57
3. "Dead Tracks" – 3:22
4. "Heat Rash" – 2:47
5. "Fireproof" – 2:40
6. "Letterbox" – 4:03
7. "Shoreline" – 3:20
8. "Hold Fast" – 2:42
9. "Colfax" – 3:09
10. "Springless" – 3:01
11. "Matchstick" – 3:06
12. "Summer Ash" – 5:22

== Performers ==
- Corey Ayd - guitar
- Nate Gangelhoff - guitar, bass
- Nick Johnson - vocals
- Dan Elston-Jones - drums, piano
