= Let It Rock! =

Studio album by The Connection
- Released: June 25, 2013
- Studio: Thundering Sky Studios, Berwick, Maine
- Genre: Rock and roll
- Label: King Yum/Collectors Club; SP; Ghost Highway/Rumble

The Connection chronology
Connection Collection, Vol. 1 (2012)	Let It Rock! (2013)	First Time (EP) (2013)

Singles from The Connection
- 1. "Crawling from the Wreckage (Of a Saturday Night)" Released: May 27, 2013

Let It Rock! is the Connection's first full-length LP, released in June 2013. While all rock and roll, the songs on Let It Rock! are otherwise diverse in nature, and one of them incorporates touches of country music. A single, "Crawling from the Wreckage (Of a Saturday Night)", was released before the album as a 7-inch single.

Let It Rock! was album of the summer on El Sotano Radio in Madrid, Spain, in 2013. Goldmine magazine named Let It Rock number 14 on its Top 20 Albums of 2013, stating, "A helping of punk energy, plenty of pop songwriting smarts and a whole lotta rock and roll attitude sums up these New Hampshire boys."

== Overview ==
=== Production ===
The record features two covers: "Connection" by the Rolling Stones, and Chuck Berry's classic "Let it Rock." The other tracks are original Marino/Palmer compositions. According to Marino, "Some of the songs are like the first album ... that 1964 AM radio, three chord [sound], and then we have some other songs where they sound more like a 1972 Rolling Stones' song. We have saxophone, piano ... I tune my guitar to the Keith Richards tuning ... we just let it rip."

=== "Crawling from the Wreckage" ===
Released earlier than the album on May 27, 2013, was a promo single "Crawling from the Wreckage (Of a Saturday Night)." The song is an original Marino/Palmer composition, and is an up-tempo number that pays homage to Dave Edmunds and his 1979 Graham Parker-penned song, "Crawling from the Wreckage."

=== Album release ===
In June 2013, The Connection's first full-length LP Let It Rock! was released in the US on King Yum Records and Collectors Club Records. By December 2013, the album was released in Spain. The American LP record had 13 tracks, and there were 14 tracks in Europe. The album was then reissued as a 22-track CD by adding the songs from the Connection Collection Vol.1 EP. This version was released in Japan.

=== Reception ===
Let It Rock! was album of the summer on El Sotano Radio in Madrid in 2013. Goldmine Magazine named Let It Rock number 14 on its Top 20 Albums of 2013, stating, "A helping of punk energy, plenty of pop songwriting smarts and a whole lotta rock and roll attitude sums up these New Hampshire boys." According to a review, "There is no one—no one—on the scene today that does rock 'n' roll better than The Connection. Their music takes us back to the early days of rock innocence and exuberance when people like Eddie Cochran, Chuck Berry, the Rolling Stones and the Fab Four sang songs that affirmed the uncontaminated perceptions of youth ... The Connection prove beyond a shadow of a doubt that rock still has its vibrance, its power and its relevance in the 21st century."

== Track listing ==
No.	Title	Writer(s)	Length
1.	"Wrong Side of 25"	Marino/Palmer	03:04
2.	"She's a Keeper"	Marino/Palmer	02:27
3.	"The Way Love Should Be"	Marino/Palmer	02:29
4.	"Crawling from the Wreckage (Of a Saturday Night)"	Marino/Palmer	02:03
5.	"Nothing About Me"	Marino/Palmer	04:15
6.	"Susan"	Marino/Palmer	02:21
7.	"Thinking About Leaving"	Marino/Palmer	02:17
8.	"Girls in This Town"	Marino/Palmer	04:21
9.	"Haze"	Marino/Palmer	02:33
10.	"Day by Day"	Marino/Palmer	01:54
11.	"Not How It's Gonna Be"	Marino/Palmer	02:44
12.	"Connection"	The Rolling Stones	02:04
13.	"Melinda"	Marino/Palmer	02:37
14.	"Let It Rock"	Chuck Berry	02:12

== Personnel ==
- Brad Marino – vocals, guitar
- Geoff Palmer – lead guitar, vocals
- Bobby Davis – bass
- Zack Sprague – drums
- Kris Rodgers – piano
