= The Manges =

Italian pop punk band

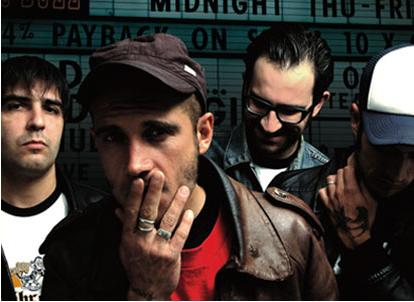

Background information
- Origin: La Spezia, Italy
- Genres: Pop punk
- Years active: 1993–present
- Members: Andrea Caredda; Riccardo Motosi; Massimo Zannoni; Manuel Cossu
- Website: www.manges.it

The Manges are an Italian pop punk band that formed in La Spezia in 1993.

The band's first release was a 2000 split with the McRackins titled Amp Records Battle Royale! In 2001 the Manges recorded their debut album The Manges 'R' Good Enough for Stardumb Records. The album drew comparisons to the Ramones and included a cover of Cyndi Lauper's "Goonies 'R' Good Enough".

The band is closely associated with The Queers, having gone on a European tour with the band; in 2003 the two bands recorded the split album Acid Beaters together. Former Queers bassist Phillip Hill produced the Manges second album Go Down. American punk band Screeching Weasel covered the Manges song "I Will Always Do" on their album Teen Punks in Heat.

== Discography ==
=== Studio albums ===
- The Manges 'R' Good Enough (2001)
- Go Down (2006)
- Bad Juju (2010)
- All Is Well (2014)
- Punk Rock Addio (2020)
- Book Of Hate For Good People (2022)

=== Live albums ===
- Rocket to Hollywood (2009)

=== Splits albums ===
- AMP Records Battle Royale! Split w/ The Mcrackins (2001)
- Acid Beaters Split w/ The Queers (2003)

=== Compilations ===
- Rocket to You 93-99 (1999)
- Rocket to You 93-03 (2003)
- Everything Released On 7" 1993-2013 (2013)

=== 7" singles ===
- "I Was A Teenage Rocker" (1996)
- "Manges" (1997)
- "All Good Cretins Go To Heaven" (1998)
- "Clean Cut Kids" (1999)
- "Mandy" / "Breakdown" (2000)
- "Barrage Of Hate" / "Havana Affair" (2003)
- "Vengeance Is Mine" (2006)
- "Kitty And The Manges" (2006)
- "Mayo Y Los Manges" (2009)
- "Art Of The Underground: Single Series, Vol. 36" (2009)
- "The Bud Spencer And Terrance Hill Experience" (2009)
- "Bad Juju" / "Sri Lanka" (2012)
- "Plan Honolulu" - Original Motion Picture Soundtrack (2014)
- "Lone Commando (All Is Well)" / "Steadfast Tin Soldier" (2014)

=== 7" split singles ===
- The Manges / Boyz Nex' Door (1995)
- Octopus Compilation (1995)
- The Manges / Egg Ebb (1997)
- Ramones Tribute (1997)
- The Manges / Raggity Anne (1998)
- Hook Up Bikini Girls (2000)
- The Manges / Hard-Ons (2010)
- The Manges / Fast Food (2012)
- The Manges / HEAD (2012)
- The Manges / The Apers (2012)
- The Manges / CJ Ramone (2015)
- The Manges / The Peawees (2017)
