= The New Trocaderos =

American rock band

- Origin: New England; Los Angeles, California
- Genres: Rock 'n' roll, power pop, indie rock, garage rock
- Years active: 2013–present
- Labels: Uncle Mike's RnR, Ghost Highway Recordings, Kool Kat Musik
- Members: Brad Marino, Geoff Palmer, Kurt Baker, Kris Rodgers, Rick Orcutt
- Website: The New Trocaderos on Bandcamp

The New Trocaderos is an independent American rock 'n' roll/power pop/indie rock/garage rock band formed in November 2013 by New England natives Brad Marino and Geoff Palmer of The Connection, and Kurt Baker of the Kurt Baker Band. The group has released several EPs including The New Trocaderos and Frenzy in the Hips, with John Borack of Goldmine Magazine calling the band "sort of a mini-supergroup" and describing its sound as "a louder version of mid-'70s Dave Edmunds all hopped up on stimulants." Their first full-length album, Thrills & Chills, was released on August 20, 2015, and a vinyl release and sold out tour of Spain took place in October. Pop that Goes Crunch described the band's music as "timeless rock ‘n’ roll for the modern world."

== History ==
=== 2013: Founding and first releases ===
The rock band The New Trocaderos formed in 2013 when musicians Brad Marino and Geoff Palmer of The Connection began collaborating with Kurt Baker to record two rock 'n' roll / powerpop songs written by Los Angeles songwriter and producer Michael Chaney. Initially they recorded two songs for The New Trocaderos (EP), then three more for the Kick Your Ass EP. "Luckiest Man In The World" was recorded in February, 2015 for Frenzy in the Hips, a CD containing all six tracks recorded by the band up to that point.

Released in 2013, the band’s debut EP was titled The New Trocaderos. "Money Talks" features Marino on lead vocal, while "The Kids" features Baker on lead vocal. Both songs feature Geoff Palmer on lead guitar, Baker on rhythm guitar and bass, and Marino on rhythm guitar and drums. The New Trocaderos was released in Spain as a 45-RPM vinyl single by Ghost Highway Recordings. The Ghost Highway cover art is a reference to the influence The Rolling Stones has had on band members.

Jeffrey Raskin at Pop That Goes Crunch! called the EP "good old-fashioned rock and roll done flawlessly," while PowerPopaholic described it as "a wild collaboration with songwriter/producer Michael Chaney." It was positively received by radio DJ and E Street Band guitarist Steven Van Zandt, who made "The Kids" a Coolest Song in the World (March 5, 2014) on his Little Steven’s Underground Garage Sirius XM radio station, and also placed "Money Talks" into heavy rotation. Underground Garage DJs Drew Carey and Bill Kelly put "The Kids" on their lists of Top Ten favorite songs of 2014.

=== 2014: Kick Your Ass and Frenzy in the Hips ===
External videos
- The New Trocaderos - "The Kids" (Dec 23, 2013)
- The New Trocaderos - "Dream Girl" (Oct 14, 2014) - both this track and "The Kids" (above) were chosen as a "Coolest Song in the World"

In 2014, the band brought in Craig Sala on drums and Kris "Fingers" Rodgers on keyboard. The New Trocaderos' second EP, a three-song collection of original songs titled Kick Your Ass, was released in October 2014 on the Uncle Mike's RnR label. In March, Kick Your Ass was released on vinyl in Spain by Ghost Highway Recordings as a three-song 45. Reviewer John Borack of Goldmine Magazine gave Kick Your Ass an "A" rating, calling the band "sort of a mini-supergroup" and describing the release as "a louder version of mid-‘70s Dave Edmunds all hopped up on stimulants." In December 2014, Lord Rutledge at the FasterandLouder blog named Kick Your Ass his EP of the Year, stating, "there's not one hit here but rather three of them - each one taking inspiration from a different period of rock n' roll...[The New Trocaderos] do their heroes proud by crafting songs good enough to hold up in any era." Van Zandt made the EP's track "Dream Girl" a Coolest Song in the World on January 4, 2015, premiering it on a show dedicated to the Beatles and in which he interviewed Paul McCartney.

The band's EP Frenzy in the Hips was released on February 6, 2015 by Uncle Mike's RnR, and is being distributed by Kool Kat Musik. The EP includes the five tracks from the band's previous releases, plus the new, original song, "Luckiest Man In The World", "another bristling slice of hook-filled rockin’ pop rooted deeply in the British Invasion and garage rock sounds of the 1960s." The review blog Powerpop Carolina wrote in a positive review that, "If you’re familiar with Rockpile... then this is the record for you." In response to the EP, Something Else Reviews wrote that "The New Trocaderos offer a feisty fusion of garage punk, power pop, and rockabilly that reaches deep into the heart and groin."

=== 2015: Thrills & Chills ===
The New Trocaderos went into the studio in June 2015 to record new original material, including "What The Hell Did I Do," "I'm So Bad, "Love And Hate" and "Crazy Little Fool." Fifteen songs were recorded. Twelve are on Thrills & Chills while three were held back for a future EP. The three original members of the band plus more recent members Kris "Fingers" Rodgers and Rick "Stix" Orcutt took part, as did guest vocalists Kim Shattuck, Palmyra Delran and Line Cecile Dahlmann. Marino's friend Steve Philp was enlisted to play harmonica and slide guitar. The recording and mixing took place in Portsmouth, New Hampshire. Thrills & Chills was released on CD on August 20, 2015, and a vinyl release and supporting tour of Spain took place in October.

"[The album] shows that Chaney can write, and The New Trocaderos can sing and play, in virtually any style that is part of the basic rock idiom — blues, country, rockabilly, jangle pop, power pop, doo-wop, punk rock, garage rock, etc.... [the songs] alternate between glee, pathos, self-deprecation, anger, lust, passion, disinterest, and humor."

— Pop that Goes Crunch

The LP met with a uniformly positive reception from critics. It received praise from both Goldmine Magazine and Power Pop News, which described the songs as "an artistic leap forward." Faster and Louder went so far as to call it "a lock for album of the year," while Pop that Goes Crunch proclaimed it "year-end Top 10 stuff" and "timeless rock ‘n’ roll for the modern world." It was named Album of the Week for August 23, 2015 by the website 50thirdand3rd. Faster and Louder named the album No. 1 on its list of the "Top Ten Albums of 2015" in December. Labor of Love from The Connection was named #3, and Play It Cool from Kurt Baker was named #2, giving "The New England Mafia" a clean sweep of the top three positions. Real Gone described Thrills & Chills as "sharply produced and with choruses designed to stick with the listener in double quick time," Beverly Paterson of Something Else Reviews wrote that "[T]he New Trocaderos are the genuine article...breathing fire and fury into their insanely catchy tunes...pounding garage rock grooves and crafty pop detours."

=== 2015: "Girl Band" - The Dahlmanns ===
After Line Cecilie Dahlmann guest appeared to sing backup on four songs on Thrills & Chills, the Norwegian pop band The Dahlmanns, her main group, released as a single the Michael Chaney composition "Girl Band". The Dahlmanns previously had performed the Kurt Baker composition "He's A Drag".

"Girl Band" was released through Pop Detective Records and was named "The Coolest Song in the World" by Little Steven's Underground Garage during the week of Thanksgiving, 2015. Faster and Louder named Michael Chaney its Songwriter of the Year in its 2015 Lord Rutledge Awards on December 23, 2015, writing "Chaney's songwriting brings to mind those classic late '60s albums by The Kinks, Rolling Stones, and Beatles - but in a fully original and relevant way."

=== 2016: Tommy and The Rockets - Beer and Fun and Rock 'n' Roll ===
In April 2016, the album Beer and Fun and Rock 'n' Roll was released by Tommy and The Rockets, a Danish group led by Thomas Stubgaard. Nine of the CD/LP's ten songs were written by Stubgaard and New Trocaderos' songwriter, Michael Chaney. The tenth song was a solo Chaney composition. New Trocaderos Brad Marino, Kris "Fingers" Rodgers, and Geoff Palmer were involved in the project, with multi-instrumentalist Marino on drums, Rodgers on organ and piano, and Palmer engineering part of the album and mixing all of it. The release met with a positive response from rock legend Ed Stasium (producer/engineer The Ramones, The Smithereens, Talking Heads, Mick Jagger), with reviewer John M. Borack of Goldmine Magazine calling the music "melodic sunshine seamlessly melding The Ramones, The Beach Boys and bubblegum." Richard Rossi of PowerPopNews opined that "[T]he songs are...the essence of the Beach Boys, Rockpile and The Ramones all rolled into one."

== Members ==
Current as of 2015

- Brad Marino - rhythm and lead guitar, drums, tambourine, vocals
- Geoff Palmer - lead and rhythm guitar, acoustic guitar, vocals
- Kurt Baker - bass, lead and rhythm guitar, vocals
- Kris "Fingers" Rodgers – keyboards
- Rick "Stix" Orcutt – drums

Supporting musicians

- Craig "One-Take" Sala – drums on "Kick Your Ass"
- Steve Philp - harmonica and slide guitar on Thrills & Chills
- Nick Mainella – saxophone on Thrills & Chills
- Chris Klaxton - trumpet on Thrills & Chills
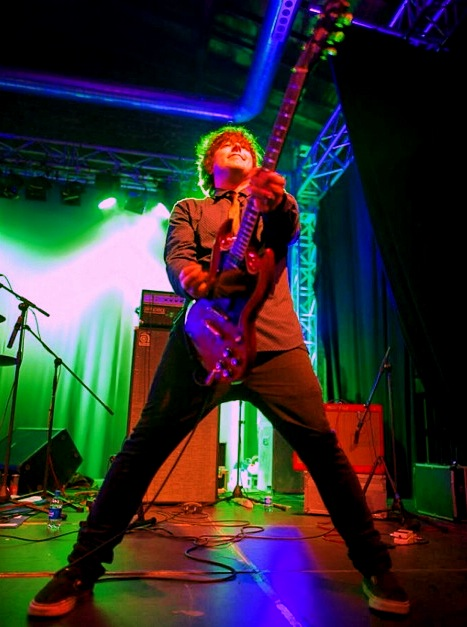
Geoff Palmer

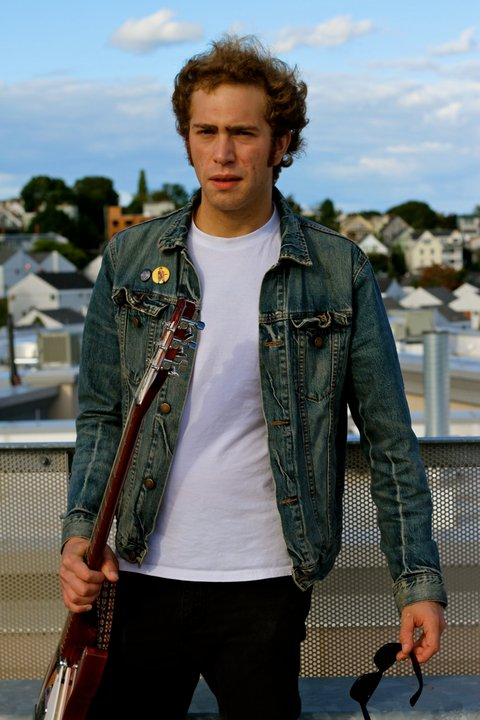
Kurt Baker

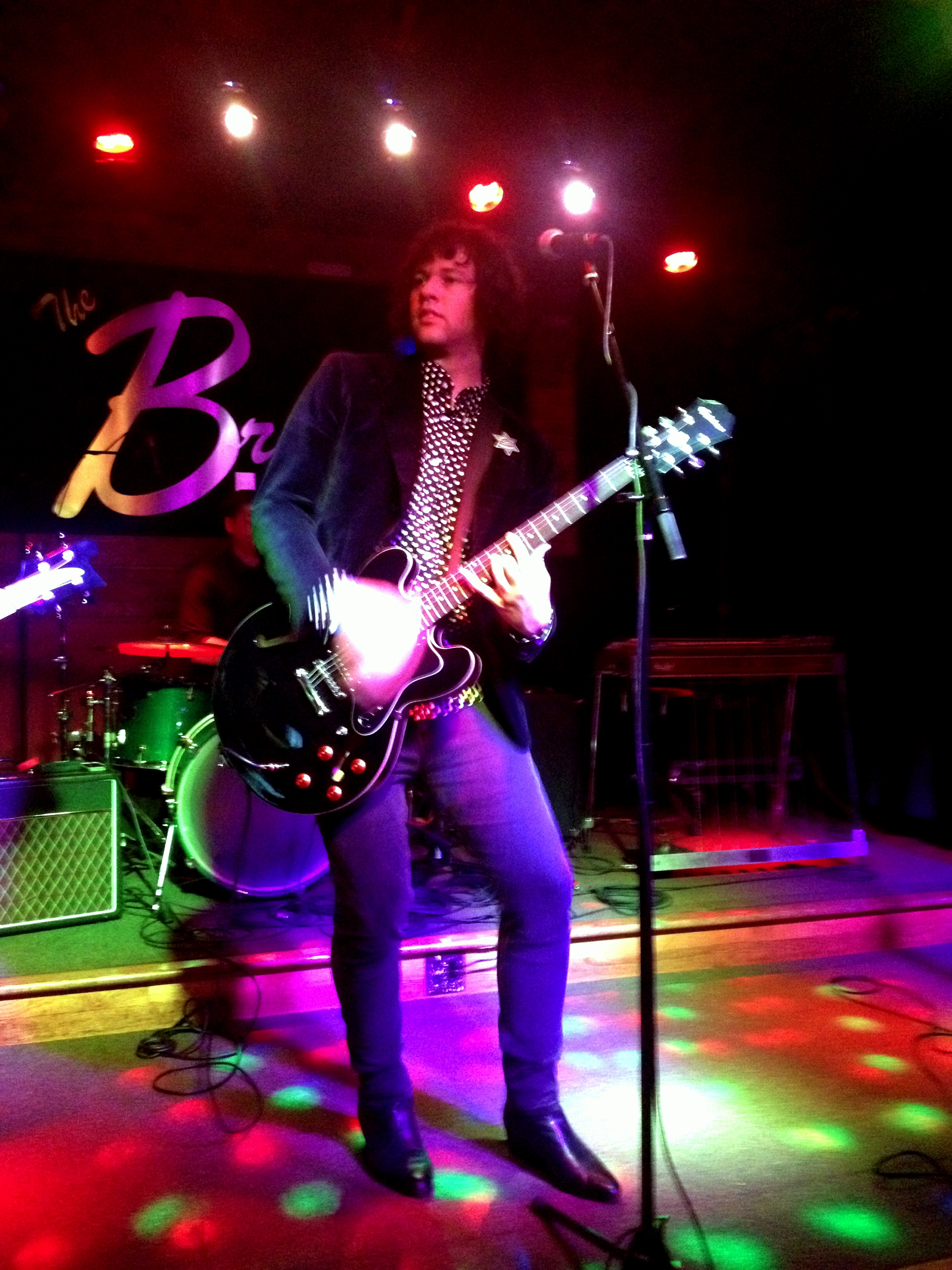
Brad Marino

== Discography ==
=== Albums ===
Albums by The New Trocaderos
Year	Album title	Release details
2015	Thrills & Chills	Released: August 20, 2015; Label: Uncle Mike's RnR (USA); Format: Digital download, CD, Vinyl LP, Ghost Highway Records/KOTJ Records (Madrid, Spain)

=== Extended plays ===
EPs by The New Trocaderos
Year	Album title	Release details
2013	The New Trocaderos (EP)	Released: 2013; Label: Uncle Mike's RnR (USA) / Ghost Highway Recordings (Spain); Format: CD, digital, vinyl
2014	Kick Your Ass (EP)	Released: October 2014; Label: Uncle Mike's RnR (USA) / Ghost Highway Recordings (Spain); Format: CD, Digital, Vinyl
2015	Frenzy in the Hips (EP)	Released: February 6, 2015; Label: Uncle Mike's RnR; Distributor: Kool Kat Musik; Format: CD

=== Singles ===
Selected songs by The New Trocaderos
Year	Title	Album	Release details
2013	"Money Talks"	Single - A side	Written by M. Chaney
2013	"The Kids"	Single - B side	Written by M. Chaney
2014	"Kick Your Ass"	Kick Your Ass	45-RPM vinyl single
