= Collapser =

Studio album by Banner Pilot
- Released: September 1, 2009
- Genre: Punk rock
- Length: 34:16
- Label: Fat Wreck Chords

Banner Pilot chronology
Resignation Day (2008)	Collapser (2009)	Heart Beats Pacific (2011)

Professional ratings
Review scores
Source	Rating
Punknews.org	4/5 stars

Collapser is the second album released by Banner Pilot. It was released on September 1, 2009 on Fat Wreck Chords. 330 copies were made on colored vinyl. Collapser was the #14 album of 2009 on punknews.org.

== Track listing ==
1. "Central Standard" - 2:50
2. "Pensacola" - 1:49
3. "Greenwood" - 3:10
4. "Starting At An Ending" - 3:16
5. "Skeleton Key" - 3:02
6. "Northern Skyline" - 2:58
7. "Drains To The Mississippi" - 3:05
8. "Farewell To Iron Bastards" - 2:41
9. "Empty Lot" - 2:21
10. "Hold Me Up" - 2:47
11. "Losing Daylight" - 2:54
12. "Write It Down" - 3:23

== Personnel ==
- Nick Johnson - Guitar, Vocals
- Nate Gangelhoff - Bass
- Corey Ayd - Guitar, Backing Vocals
- Danny Elston-Jones - Drums
