= Kurt Baker (musician) =

American singer

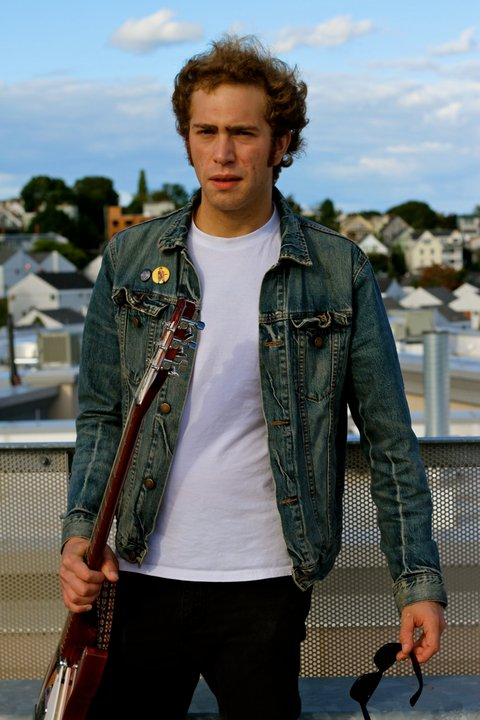

Background information
- Born: Kurt Milton Baker; January 31, 1987 (age 39); Portland, Maine, USA
- Genres: Alternative rock, rock, power pop, punk rock, indie rock, indie pop
- Instruments: Vocals, bass, guitar
- Years active: 2000–present
- Labels: Wicked Cool Records, Oglio, Jolly Ronnie, Collector's Club, Torreznetes Entertainment, Rumble Records, Dirty Witch Records, Pop Out Records
- Member of: The Kurt Baker Band, The New Trocaderos
- Formerly of: The Leftovers, Wimpy & the Medallions, Bullet Proof Lovers
- Website: www.kurtbakermusic.com

Kurt Milton Baker (born January 31, 1987, in Portland, Maine) is an American musician, songwriter, music producer, and multi-instrumentalist. He is best known for his work in the Pop-Punk group The Leftovers and his own band The Kurt Baker Band.

== Overview ==
Baker has released several solo projects with his Power Pop group The Kurt Baker Band, which plays punk rock music inspired by pop music of the 1960s, 1970s, and 1980s.

Baker was the founding member, bass player, singer, & songwriter of the notable pop/punk outfit The Leftovers, which formed in 2002 and released several records on Rally Records, Insubordination Records and Oglio Records. The group toured extensively and played London, England's celebrated Roundhouse Theater before disbanding in 2010.

Baker's blend of Beach Boys and Beatles-styled melodies has earned him the praise of Larry Livermore (founder of Lookout Records), Ben Weasel (Screeching Weasel) and Jaret Reddick (Bowling For Soup). After the release of The Leftovers' last album, 2009's Eager to Please on Oglio Records, which featured guests ranging from Brett Anderson (The Donnas)) to Coz Canler (The Romantics), and an extensive tour of the US and Europe, Baker decided to focus on going solo.

Baker's debut solo EP Got It Covered was released on Oglio Records. Produced by Los Angeles based pop producer, Linus of Hollywood, Got It Covered features Baker's take on some of his favorite Power Pop songs of the 70s and 80s and features guests Kay Hanley (Letters To Cleo) and Adam Marcello (Katy Perry). Baker also has worked with Tommy Dunbar (the Rubinoos), Kim Shattuck (the Muffs), and Parry Gripp (Nerf Herder).

Baker's second solo effort and first post-Leftovers record to feature new original songs, Rockin’ For A Living, was released in October 2011 and was named the Number No. 1 (Power Pop) record of the year by writers (David Bash) founder of the (International Pop Overthrow) festival and music critic/author (John M. Borack) in (Goldmine Magazine). Said Borack, who ranked Baker's record far above that of long-time influence Nick Lowe, "Baker and his band barrel their way through a deliriously catchy group of stellar original tunes (“Just Forget About It" and "Don’t Steal My Heart Away" in particular deserve induction in that mythical Power Pop Hall of Fame) that owe big ‘ol debts to early Elvis Costello and the aforementioned Rubinoos. Hooks, energy and panache to spare – what's not to love?"

The Kurt Baker Band toured across Europe playing sold out shows in Spain and Italy in support of Rockin' For A Living and enlisted Adam Cargin who drummed on albums by Screeching Weasel and the Riverdales.

In 2012, Baker released the EP titled Want You Around on Jolly Ronnie Records. It featured guest appearances by Dan Vapid and Rev. Nørb. Following the release of Want You Around, and tours of the Midwest and East Coast (supporting acts such as Tommy Stinson and The Offspring, Kurt and the gang prepared to release the follow-up to Rockin’ for a Living, an ambitious 10-song LP titled Brand New Beat. It was recorded and produced by Wyatt Funderburk, and was released on Geoff Palmer (The Connection) and Kurt's new independent label (Collector's Club Records) on October 30, 2012.

Steven Van Zandt, founder of the Sirius XM radio station "Little Steven's Underground Garage" and original member of Bruce Springsteen's E Street Band selected two songs from Brand New Beat – "She Can Do It All" and "Weekend Girls"—as 'The Coolest Song in the World,' in 2013. Also in that year, Baker and his bandmate Palmer self-released the 45 vinyl single "Girl's Got Money", which quickly sold out. On March 2, 2014, Van Zandt, also known as the character Silvio Dante from The Sopranos, named The New Trocaderos' song "The Kids" the Coolest Song in the World. On it, Baker sings lead and background vocals and plays bass and electric rhythm guitar. Brad Marino and Geoff Palmer, long-time friends and the founding members of New England rockers The Connection, fill in The New Trocaderos' lineup.

In the spring of 2014, Baker joined Bullet Proof Lovers, a punk rock n' roll group from San Sebastian, Spain consisting of members from notable acts Nuevo Catecismo Católico and Discipulos de Dionisos.

2014 also saw the formation of the Kurt Baker Combo a group based in León, Spain that followed where The Kurt Baker Band left off and incorporating garage rock and pub rock influences. They released a full length live album titled "Muy Mola Live" which was recorded in Kenosha, Wisconsin followed by two full length studio albums titled "In Orbit" and "Let's Go Wild" on Steven Van Zandt's Wicked Cool Records.

In early 2020, Kurt Baker reunited with longtime collaborator Wyatt Funderburk and the Kurt Baker Band to record the full-length album "After Party", which was subsequently released on October 23. Billboard cited the single "I Like Her A Lot" as one of "10 Cool New Pop Songs To Get Your Mind Off Of Politics".

The year 2023 saw the release of the full-length "Rock N Roll Club". Baker also started DJing on "Little Steven's Underground Garage" with his program "The Buzz Electric".

Baker now resides in New York City, working in the music industry while playing with his new line up "Kurt Baker & The 3 AM's".

== Discography ==
=== Kurt Baker ===
- "Undertow Afterglow" 45/LP (2026) (Wicked Cool Records)
- "Live at Sala Z" CD/LP (2024) (Hundreds of Records)
- "Rock N Roll Club" CD/LP (2023) (Wicked Cool Records)
- "Anchors Up" 45/EP (2023) (Wicked Cool Records)
- "Keep It Tight" 45/EP (2021) (Wicked Cool Records)
- "After Party" CD/LP (2020) (Wicked Cool Records)
- "The Lost Weekend EP" (2017) (Wicked Cool Records)
- "Play It Cool" (2015) (Rum Bar Records)
- "Brand New B-Sides" (2014) (Rum Bar Records)
- "Rough" – Spanish ONLY Release (2014) (Rumble Records)
- ¡VIVA KURT BAKER! – Spanish ONLY Release (2013) (Rumble Records)
- Girl's Got Money (2013) (Collector's Club Records)
- Brand New Beat (2012) (Collector's Club Records)
- Want You Around 45 (2012) (Jolly Ronnie Records)
- For Spanish Ears Only – Outtakes and Demos – Spanish ONLY Release (2011) (Rumble Records)
- "Dance With Me Tonight / I Don't Wanna Get Involved" 45 (2011) (Torreznetes Entertainment)
- Rockin' for a Living (2011) (Oglio Records)
- Got it Covered (2010) (Oglio Records)
- "Hanging On the Telephone/ Pump It Up" 45 (2010) (Oglio Records)

=== Kurt Baker Combo ===
- "Can't Go Back" (2019) (Wicked Cool Records)
- "(I Can't Help) Failing In Love" (2019) (Wicked Cool Records)
- "Let's Go Wild" (2018) (Wicked Cool Records)
- "In Orbit" (2016) (Wicked Cool Records)
- "Give It Up" (2015) (Hidden Volume Records)
- "Muy Mola Live" (2014) (Ghost Highway Recordings)

=== The Leftovers ===
- Eager to Please (2009) (Crappy/Oglio Records)
- Single Series Volume 21 (2007) (EP) (Art of the Underground)
- On The Move (2007) (Rally Records)
- Insubordination Fest 2007 (2008) (Live) (Insubordination Records)
- Steppin' On My Heart (2006) (EP) (Rally Records)
- Party Tonight! (2006) (Cheapskate Records)
- Stop Drop Rock N Roll (2004) (Muscle City Records)
- Mitton Street Special (2003) (EP) (Zuke'd On Phonics)

=== Wimpy and The Medallions ===
- Still Headed Nowhere – Wimpy and The Medallions (2013) Collector's Club Records

=== The New Trocaderos ===
- "Money Talks / The Kids" (2013)
- Kick Your Ass EP (2014)
- Frenzy in the Hips EP (2015)
- Thrills & Chills LP (2015)
- New Trox EP (2017)

=== Bullet Proof Lovers ===
- Bullet Proof Lovers – Self Titled EP (2019) Ghost Highway Recordings
- Bullet Proof Lovers – Shot Through The Heart (2017) Ghost Highway Recordings
- Bullet Proof Lovers – I Am My Radio EP (2017) Ghost Highway Recordings
- Bullet Proof Lovers – Bullet Proof Lovers (2014) Ghost Highway Recordings

=== K7s ===
- K7s – Take 1 (2018) (Stardumb Records)
- K7s – Mondo Bizarro (2021)(Stardumb Records)

=== The Gold ===
- The Gold (2019) (Penniman Records)
- Dead Roses/Too Far Gone (2018) (Penniman Records)
