= The Gateway District =

Pop-punk band from Minneapolis

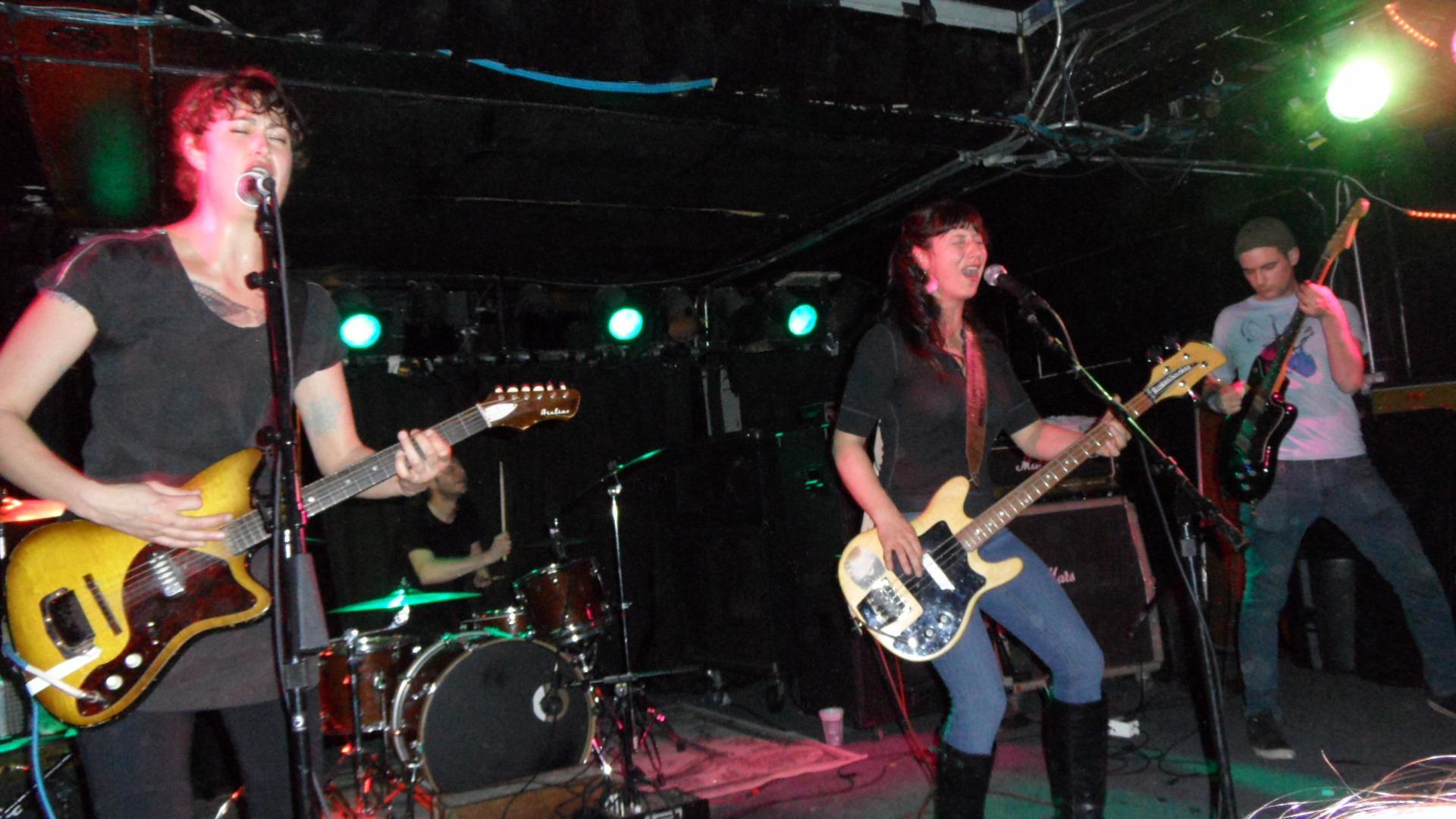
- L-R: Maren Macosko, Brad Lokkesmoe, Carrie Bleser, Nate Gangelhoff

Background information
- Origin: Minneapolis, Minnesota
- Genres: Pop punk, punk rock
- Years active: 2006–present
- Labels: It's Alive Records
- Members: Maren Macosko, Carrie Bleser, Nate Gangelhoff, Brad Lokkesmoe
- Website: Bandcamp

The Gateway District are a pop punk band from Minneapolis that feature members of several other bands, including the Soviettes, Banner Pilot, the Salteens, Dear Landlord, Rivethead and Off with Their Heads.

== Background ==
The band originally formed as a side project when the Soviettes and Rivethead stopped performing in 2006, but even though all of the band members are still active in other projects, they have continued with this project.

The band is named after a part of Minneapolis (around Hennepin and Washington) that was considered the heart of the city at one time.

== Band members ==
- Maren Macosko – guitar/vocals (The Soviettes)
- Carrie Bleser – bass/vocals (The Salteens)
- Nate Gangelhoff – guitar (Banner Pilot, Off with Their Heads, Rivethead)
- Brad Lokkesmoe – drums (Dear Landlord, Rivethead)

== Discography ==
=== EPs ===
- The Gateway District (2006, Rock Bottom Records)
- Partial Traces (2014, Salinas Records)

=== Albums ===
- Some Days You Get the Thunder (2009, It's Alive Records)
- Perfect's Gonna Fail (2011, It's Alive Records)
- Old Wild Hearts (2013, It's Alive Records)

=== Compilation appearances ===
- Punk Rock Pot Luck Vol. #2 (track: River Trash) (2009, Punk Rock Review)
- Show 'Em the Hand II (tracks: Run Away, Keeps Track Of The Time) (2011, It's Alive Records)
- Our Lips Are Sealed (track: Tonite) (2013, Solidarity Recordings)

== Reception ==
- "This Minneapolis indie rock band practices the art of kicking out the jams" (Annie Sparrows, MPR News)
- "The Gateway District have constructed a well put-together album that never runs out of steam or drags, as it works that thick, overdriven Jawbreaker base into an insistent cohesive work." (Joe Briggs, Punknews.org)
- "Some Days You Get The Thunder is just a straightforward, bass-heavy pop-punk record with deep, catchy and perfect female vocals that aren’t polished or poppy like we see so often these days. (Bobby Gorman, The Punk Site)
- "The Gateway District bring an accessible style of bouncy pop punk on their debut release, Some Days You Get the Thunder." (Loren Green, City Pages)
- "The band's ability to write a hook is plenty evident on Old Wild Hearts, perhaps no more so than on "Tell You Why," with a sugary-sweet anthemic chorus that may be the catchiest thing the band have written." (Darren McLeod, Punknews.org)
- "On their debut album, the Gateway District manage to sound like the post-punk professionals they are and at the same time to maintain a salutary level of relaxed noisiness." (Rick Anderson, Allmusic)
