= Let It Rock (1973 compilation) =

Compilation album by Various Artists
- Released: 1973
- Recorded: 1955–1973
- Genre: Rock
- Length: 31:24
- Label: Atlantic K40455
- Producer: Various

Let It Rock is a 1973 compilation album issued to celebrate the 25th anniversary of Atlantic Records. Featuring tracks from the mid-1950s to the mid-1970s, the album highlights the blues and soul roots of the label and offers glimpses of how those roots had developed over time. It is notable for its inclusion of early tracks by artists later to become major acts, and of original versions of tracks later to become classics. It was compiled by Charlie Gillett and Dave Laing (editor of Let It Rock magazine), who also provided the sleeve notes.

== Track listing ==
=== Side One ===
- "Boogie Woogie Country Girl" (Turner) - Joe Turner (2:42)
- "Party Party" (Beard/Willet) - Dean Beard (2:14)
- "Rave On!" (West/Petty/Tilgheman) - Sonny West (2:11)
- "Weekend" (Gibb) - The Kingsmen (2:12)
- "Swingin' Baby Doll" (Gates) - David Gates (3:00)
- "I'm a Hog for You Baby" (Leiber/Stoller) - The Coasters (1:57)

=== Side Two ===
- "Long Tall Sally" (Penniman/Johnson/Blackwell) - Barbara Green (2:05)
- "I Can Tell" (E. McDaniel/Smith) - John Hammond (3:20)
- "Waiting For A Train" (Rodgers) - Boz Scaggs (2:40)
- "Back in the USA" (Berry) - MC5 (2:35)
- "Junko Partner" (Shad) - Dr. John (4:27)
- "Pack Fair and Square" (Big Walter Price) - The J. Geils Band (2:01)

== The Album Cover ==
The sleeve was designed by David Willis and Flying Colours and features a humorous take on the Statue of Liberty. Instead of a torch, she holds up a microphone typical of those used in the mid-1950s, and flashes her legs.

== Notes ==
All are sourced from the sleeve notes:
