= Fatal Flaw =

Fatal Flaw may refer to:

- Hamartia
- The Fatal Flaw, 2026 album by Paris Paloma
- The Fatal Flaw: A Special Edition of 20/20, 2022 American four-part television documentary series
- Kojak: Fatal Flaw, 1989 episode of television series Kojak
