= Banner Pilot =

Punk band from Minnesota, United States

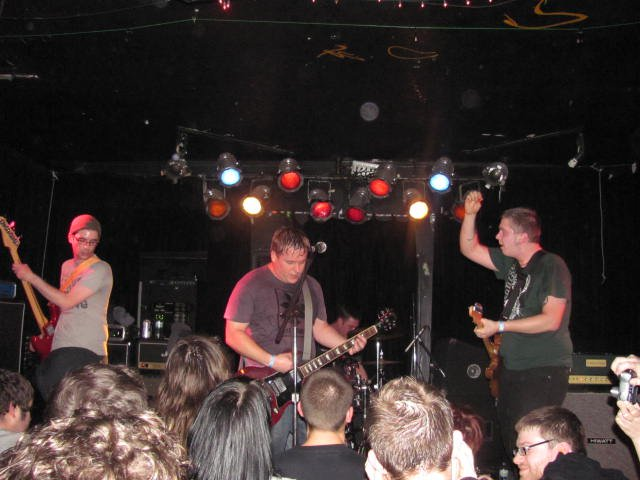
- Banner Pilot in Chicago, 2011

Background information
- Origin: Minneapolis, Minnesota, United States
- Genres: Punk rock, melodic hardcore
- Years active: 2005-present
- Labels: Fat Wreck Chords, Go-Kart Records, Kiss of Death Records
- Members: Nick Johnson; Nate Gangelhoff; Danny Elston-Jones; Jeff Matika
- Past members: Mike Johnson; Corey Ayd
- Website: http://bannerpilot.net/

Banner Pilot is a punk band from Minneapolis, Minnesota, United States. Their music is influenced by acts such as Jawbreaker, The Lawrence Arms, Screeching Weasel, and Hot Water Music.

== History ==
The band was formed by Nate Gangelhoff and Nick Johnson in 2005 following the dissolution of their previous band, Rivethead. The two self-released a demo the same year, garnering positive reviews from both Punknews and Razorcake. The following year they released the EP Pass the Poison and toured the East Coast, drawing the attention of Go-Kart Records.

In late 2007 and early 2008, the band recorded their Go-Kart Records debut full length, Resignation Day. Mike left the band to return to school and Corey was recruited as a replacement for their summer West Coast tour.

In April, 2009, Banner Pilot was signed to Fat Wreck Chords. Their first album for the label, titled Collapser was released on September 1, 2009. Shortly after they embarked on an East Coast tour in support of the album with labelmates Dead to Me and Teenage Bottlerocket that included an appearance at The Fest in Gainesville, Florida.

Fat Wreck Chords also released a remixed and remastered version of the band's first album, Resignation Day in 2010.

In April, 2010, the band did a European tour, which included a stop at Groezrock, an annual music festival in Belgium.

In July, 2013, it was announced that the band had written 13 new songs and were working on a 14th for an upcoming album, which would feature 11 or 12 of the best songs. The group's next album, Souvenir, was eventually released in April 2014.

In April 2025, they were announced as one of the supporting bands for The Fest in Gainesville, Florida.

== Band members ==
=== Current members ===
- Nick Johnson - Lead Vocals, Rhythm Guitar (2005–present)
- Nate Gangelhoff - Bass (2005–present)
- Danny Elston-Jones - Drums (2005–present)
- Jeff Matika - Lead Guitar (2014–present)

=== Past members ===
- Mike Johnson - Lead Guitar (2005–2008)
- Corey Ayd - Lead Guitar (2008–2014)

=== Touring Members ===
- Kody Templeman - Additional Guitar, Additional Vocals (2024-present)

== Other projects ==
Nate is a guitarist in the punk band The Gateway District and occasionally plays with Off With Their Heads. He is also a writer, having recently released a book that is a compilation of his zines entitled You Idiot. Corey is the guitarist/vocalist for Minneapolis punk band The Manix.

== Discography ==
=== Studio albums ===
- Resignation Day (2008)
- Collapser (2009)
- Heart Beats Pacific (2011)
- Souvenir (2014)

=== EPs ===
- Pass the Poison (2006)

=== Split releases ===
- Banner Pilot / Monikers (2007)
