= The Leftovers (American band) =

American pop punk band

- Origin: Portland, Maine, USA
- Genres: Pop punk, power pop
- Years active: 2002–2011
- Labels: Oglio Records
- Members: Kurt Baker; Andrew Rice; Adam Woronoff; Matt Anderson
- Past members: Drew Perez (Guitar, vocals)

The Leftovers were an American pop punk band from Portland, Maine, made up of Kurt Baker (bass, vocals), Andrew Rice (guitar, vocals), Matt Anderson (guitar, vocals), and Adam Woronoff (drums).

== History ==
The band formed in 2002, and gained a following by releasing an E.P. entitled Mitton Street Special. Two years later they released their first full-length album, 2004's Stop, Drop, Rock n Roll. In 2007 the band released their third album On the Move. The album was recorded at Butch Vig's Smart Studios and was produced by Ben Weasel.

The band has recently finished recording their upcoming album Eager To Please, due out on Oglio Records in the spring of 2009. To promote the album the band went on a Summer tour where they opened for Bowling For Soup and Teen Idols.

In addition to playing with The Leftovers, drummer Adam Woronoff has also played in The Queers.

== Discography ==
=== Studio albums ===
- Stop Drop Rock N Roll (2004) (Muscle City Records)
- Party Tonight! (2006) (Cheapskate Records)
- On the Move (2007) (Rally Records)
- Eager to Please (2009) (Crappy/Oglio Records)

=== Other ===
- Mitton Street Special (2002) (EP) (Zuke'd on Phonics)
- Steppin' on My Heart (2006) (EP) (Rally Records)
- Single Series Volume 21 (2007) (EP) (Art of the Underground)
- Insubordination Fest 2007 (2008) (Live) (Insubordination Records)
