= Phillip Hill =

American bass and guitar player

Phillip Hill is an American musician and songwriter. He is best known as the guitarist and co-founder of the Nashville punk rock band Teen Idols with bassist Matt Benson.

== Early life and education ==
Hill was born in Nashville, Tennessee to mother Phyllis Hill and father Ralph Emery on November 3, 1972. Growing up in a musical surrounding in Nashville, he was banking the keys on the piano and learning his first chords on guitar at the age of 3. Hill formed his first band at the age of 13, and within a few years was playing professional concerts around the Southeast as a hired guitarist or bass guitarist in various hard rock bands. Hill began writing his own songs and soon founded his own band, Teen Idols, at the age of 19 in the spring of 1992. The band was soon topping the local college radio charts with its first recordings.

Hill graduated from Hillsboro Comprehensive High School in 1992 with awards in recording sciences and musicianship under the instruction of the Grand Ole Opry soundman, Vic Gabany.

== Career ==
He has been involved in several pop punk bands, including Teen Idols, Screeching Weasel, Common Rider, Even in Blackouts, and The Queers. Hill has also worked extensively as a recording engineer. His audio engineering credentials appear on numerous albums with a wide spectrum of musical styles, from the punk rock sounds of bands such as Anti-Flag, Rise Against, Screeching Weasel and his own band, Teen Idols, to thrash metal, country, folksy-blues, and bluegrass.

At the age of 20, he was hired in an audio/visual position at Nashville's premier amusement park, Opryland U.S.A. While at Opryland, Hill worked as a video switcher on the stage production of Hee Haw Live, as well as running a spotlight for such performers as George Jones, Tammy Wynette, Alabama, Tanya Tucker and the Oak Ridge Boys.

After assisting in the engineering of Teen Idols recordings at the Sonic Iguana Studios in Lafayette, Indiana, in 1996, Hill was offered a job as an engineer by the producer Mass Giorgini. This position led Hill to move to Lafayette, where he soon became involved with many studio projects in the pop-punk musical genre.

Hill is currently a freelance musician and songwriter.

== Discography ==
The following albums were recorded with Teen Idols:

- Teen Idols
- Pucker Up
- Full Leather Jacket

== Personal life ==
He resides in his home town of Nashville with his wife Presley Deen and their two sons.
