= Night Birds (band) =

- Origin: New Jersey, United States
- Genres: Punk rock
- Years active: 2009–2023
- Labels: Dirtnap Records, Fat Wreck Chords

Night Birds were an American punk rock band from New Jersey.

== History ==
Night Birds were formed in the spring of 2009 after the breakup of The Ergs!, when former Ergs! bassist Joe Keller joined forces with vocalist Brian Gorsegner and guitarist Mike Hunchback. The band named themselves after the 1970 film Nightbirds, a film by cult horror director Andy Milligan.

Initially self-releasing a four-song demo, their first EP, a self-titled 7-inch, was released in 2010 as a joint effort between Dirtnap Records and Grave Mistake Records. In 2011, Night Birds released their debut full-length, The Other Side of Darkness,on Grave Mistake Records.

In early 2012, guitarist Mike Hunchback departed the group as their performance schedule became more demanding, and was replaced by PJ Russo. Hunchback would go on to play in Worriers and Screeching Weasel.

The band followed up with the album Born to Die in Suburbia in 2013, their final release with Grave Mistake. Later that year, they released the EP Maimed for the Masses, their first release for Fat Wreck Chords.

After cycling through more than half a dozen drummers, Darick Sater became the an official member in 2015. That same year, they released their third LP, Mutiny at Muscle Beach. Night Birds released their final EP Roll Credits in 2018, featuring guest vocals from Jerry A. of Poison Idea. In 2022, they issued a compilation titled Maimed for the Masses (distinct from the 2013 EP), collecting demos, outtakes, and rarities from their career.

The band played their final show on December 30, 2023 in Asbury Park, New Jersey.

== Band members ==
- Brian Gorsegner – vocals (2009–present)
- Joe Keller – bass (2009–present)
- PJ Russo – guitar (2012–present)
- Darick Sater – drums (2015–present)
- Mike Hunchback – guitar (2009–2012)
- Ryan McHale – drums (2009–2015)

== Discography ==
=== Studio albums ===
- The Other Side of Darkness (2011, Grave Mistake Records)
- Born to Die in Suburbia (2013, Grave Mistake Records)
- Mutiny at Muscle Beach (2015, Fat Wreck Chords)

=== EPs and compilations ===
- Night Birds (2010, Dirtnap/Grave Mistake)
- Fresh Kills Vol. 1 (2011, Grave Mistake)
- Maimed for the Masses (2013, EP – Fat Wreck Chords)
- Roll Credits (2018, Fat Wreck Chords)
- Maimed for the Masses (2022, compilation – Grave Mistake)
