= The Apers =

Dutch pop punk band

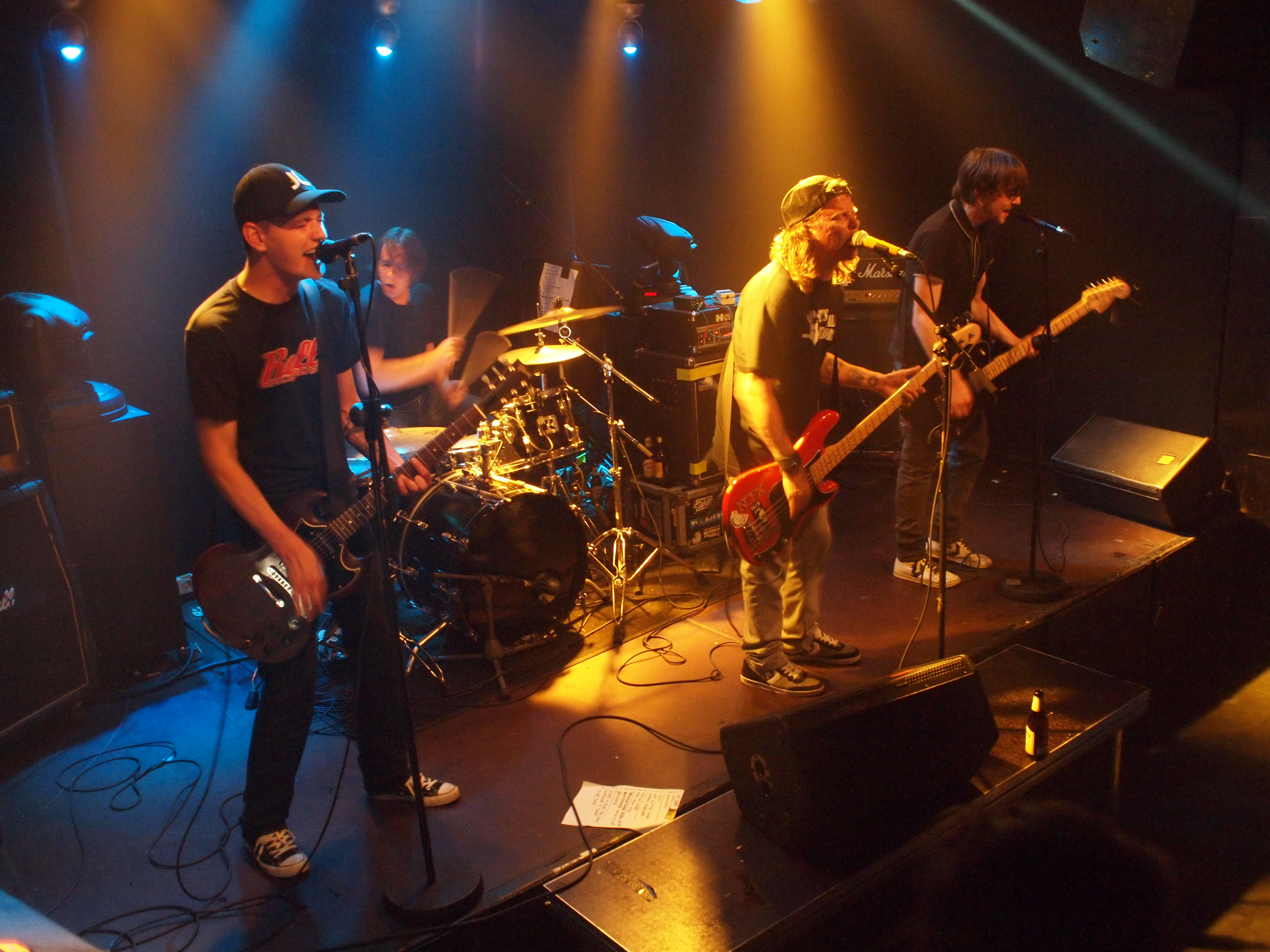
- The Apers - Live concert in 2012

Background information
- Origin: Rotterdam, Netherlands
- Genres: Pop punk
- Years active: 1996–present
- Labels: Asian Man, Stardumb, Insubordination
- Members: Kevin Aper; Kelvin Centerfold; Ivo Backbreaker; Mikey Bat Bite

The Apers are a Dutch pop punk band who formed in Rotterdam in 1996. They have released their first three albums on Stardumb Records, then released their 2007 album Reanimate My Heart on Sonic Rendezvous Records in Europe, and Insubordination Records in the US, before moving on to Asian Man Records. They have played about 700 shows all over Europe and the USA. The band is often compared to Screeching Weasel, not lastly because of frontman Kevin Aper's snotty vocal delivery, reminiscent of Ben Weasel.

== Band members ==
Current members:

- Kevin Aper – vocals, bass guitar
- Ivo Backbreaker – drums
- Michael Stoel – guitars

Past members:

- Jerry Hormone – guitars, backing vocals (2000–2005)
- Marien Nicotine – guitars, backing vocals (1996–2007)
- Kelvin Centerfold – guitars (2005–2010)

== Discography ==
=== Studio albums ===
- The Apers - 2001
- The Buzz Electric - 2003
- Skies Are Turning Blue - 2005
- Reanimate My Heart - 2007
- You Are Only as Strong as the Table You Dance On - 2009
- Confetti on the Floor - 2014

=== Live albums ===
- Live at the Eldorado - 2012

=== Compilations ===
- The Wild & Savage Apers - 2004
- Still Cruisin' After All These Beers - 2010

=== Splits ===
- Retarded/Apers - 2005
- 20 Belows/Apers - 2008
- Apers/Sons Of Buddha - 2011
- The Riptides & The Apers - What About The Monster - 2013

=== EPs ===
- Teenage Drama Every Kid Will Understand - 2000
- Surprise! - 2023

=== Singles ===
- Eyes Open Wide - 2001
