= Teen Idols =

American pop punk band

- From left: Matt Yonker, Keith Witt, Heather Tabor, and Phillip Hill

Background information
- Origin: Nashville, Tennessee, United States
- Genres: Pop punk, punk rock
- Years active: 1992–2003, 2008–2010
- Labels: House O' Pain, Honest Don's, Fueled by Ramen
- Members: Phillip Hill; Keith Witt; Chris Mason; Yvonne Szumski
- Past members: Jemima Kate; Nathan Bice; Kevin Sierzega; Heather Tabor; Matt Yonker; Wes White; Roxanne "Rocksan" Biggerstaff; Keaton Sims; Janell Saxton; Steve Saxton; Matt Benson; Chris Trujillo

The Teen Idols were a pop punk band originally from Nashville, Tennessee. They were formed in 1992 by Phillip Hill and originally broke up in 2003. The band reunited in 2008 in Chicago, Illinois, with a retooled lineup before breaking up again in 2010.

== History ==
The band was formed in 1992 in Nashville, Tennessee and quickly gained local popularity while playing at venues such as Lucy's Record Shop and receiving frequent airplay on Nashville college radio. During the mid-90s, they released several EPs under the local indie label, House O' Pain. In 1996, the Nashville Music Association nominated the band for their Independent Artist of the Year award. A year later, the Teen Idols released their first full-length album under the indie label Honest Don's Records. They released two other albums under the Honest Don's label before signing to Fueled by Ramen in early 2003. Around that time, Keith Witt left the band and Kevin Sierzega (formerly of Detroit-based P.T.'s Revenge) took over the vocals. Shortly thereafter, the band released the album Nothing to Prove in July 2003, but broke up during the subsequent tour. During their heyday, the Teen Idols headlined many tours in the U.S. and played support with other notable bands such as NOFX, Anti-Flag, Less Than Jake, and The Queers.

After the breakup of the Teen Idols, Tabor, Yonker, and Witt joined forces with Geis and Gui from Rehasher and have toured and recorded as the band Bullets to Broadway. The band released one album, Drink Positive, and supported Lagwagon and Lawrence Arms on US legs as well as Less Than Jake on their 2006 European tour. Yanker went on to play with The Queers, Ben Weasel, The Methadones and would own Drastic Sounds Recording Studio in Nashville. Hill did duties with many bands including The Queers, Screeching Weasel, and Even in Blackouts.

In December 2008, the Teen Idols announced that they had decided to come out of retirement and would soon be making new records and playing shows again. In early 2009, the Teen Idols announced a tentative agreement to sign with Fat Wreck Chords but an official contract never materialized. Later that year, guitar player Phillip Hill was hospitalized with four broken ribs and a collapsed lung after trying to break up a fight. Because he lacked health insurance, an account was set up to help raise money for his medical bills. The band broke up again in June 2010.

Former bassist Roxanne "Rocksan" Biggerstaff, who later worked as a professional wrestling valet in various promotions, especially under the ring name BellaDonna as part of the early 2000s stable The Disciples of the New Church in Total Nonstop Action Wrestling (TNA), died on January 21, 2019. She was 39.

== Members ==
=== Final lineup ===
- Phillip Hill – guitar (1992–2010)
- Keith Witt – vocals (1995–2000, 2008–2010)
- Chris Mason – drums (2009–2010)
- Yvonne Szumski – bass (2009–2010)

=== Former members ===
- Jemima Kate – bass (2008–2009)
- Nathan Bice – drums (2008–2009)
- Kevin Sierzega – vocals (2001–2003)
- Heather Tabor – bass (1996–2003)
- Matt Yonker - drums (1996–2003)
- Wes White – drums (1994–1996)
- Roxanne "Rocksan" Biggerstaff – bass (1995–1996; died 2019)
- Keaton Sims – vocals (1994–1995)
- Janell Saxton – bass (1992–1995)
- Steve Saxton – drums (1992–1994)
- Matt Benson – vocals (1992–1993)
- Chris Trujillo – drums (1992)

== Discography ==
=== Studio albums ===
- Teen Idols (1997)
- Pucker Up (1999)
- Full Leather Jacket (2000)
- Nothing to Prove (2003)

=== Singles and EPs ===
- Old Days, Old Ways (EP) (1993)
- Nightmares (EP) (1994)
- Let's Make Noise (EP) (1995)
- Teen Idols Split with Mulligan Stu (EP) (1996)
- V.M.Live Presents Teen Idols (EP) (1996)
- Teen Idols/Khrissy (split EP) (1996)
- Teen Idols/Spread (split EP) (1999)
- The Dysfunctional Shadowman Split CD (2003)

=== Compilation appearances ===
- I Can't Believe It's Not Water (1996)
- Four On the Floor (1998)
- Short Music for Short People (1999)
- Honest Don's Greatest Shits (1999)
- Another Round of Golf, Vol 5 (2003)
- Untitled 21: A Juvenile Tribute to the Swingin' Utters (2010)
