= Geoff Palmer (musician) =

American singer-songwriter (born 1980)

Geoff Palmer (aka Geoff Useless)
- Geoff Palmer in Italy with the Kurt Baker band

Background information
- Also known as: Geoff Useless
- Born: Geoffrey C Palmer; January 17, 1980 (age 46); Wakefield
- Origin: Portsmouth, New Hampshire, and Madison, Wisconsin, U.S.
- Genres: Punk rock, power pop, folk punk, rock and roll
- Occupation: Musician - Singer-songwriter
- Instruments: Guitar, bass, vocals, drums
- Years active: 1996–present
- Labels: Stardumb, Wicked Cool, Livid, Rally, Hopeless, Suburban Home, Doheny
- Member of: The Connection
- Formerly of: The New Trocaderos, Wimpy and The Medallions, The Queers, The Guts, The Drunken Cholos, The Nobodys
- Website: https://geoffpalmer.bandcamp.com

Geoffrey Palmer (born January 17, 1980), also known by the stage name Geoff Useless, is an American musician. Born in Wakefield, Massachusetts, he played bass, provided backing vocals for The Queers, and provided guitar and lead vocals for The Guts and The Nobodys.

Currently, Palmer co-writes songs for, and plays lead guitar in a traditional rock and roll and power pop band called The Connection. He signed with Stardumb Records on August 13, 2018.

== Biography ==
Palmer was born in 1980 in Wakefield, Massachusetts. As a teenager, he became the bassist for the Portsmouth, New Hampshire punk rock band The Queers. He played on the band's 1998 releases Everything's OK and Punk Rock Confidential. Following his departure from The Queers, he was the singer and guitarist for The Nobodys. Shortly thereafter, he formed the band The Guts. Originally known as She's a Guy, The Guts were formed by Palmer, bassist Nate Doyle and drummer Rick Orcutt, whilst students at Portsmouth High School.

=== The Guts and solo career ===
The Guts released their first album Sensitive side of The Guts in 2001. In 2003 they put out their second full-length album Say Goodbye to Fun and the EP So What If We're On DBD? After going a hiatus, the band reformed in 2006, and performed a worldwide tour with stops in North America, Canada, and Europe, adding Courtney Denison, of The Lanterns, as their second guitarist for the European dates. That year they re-released a compilation of early material entitled Sometimes You Just Can't Win, as well as a new EP called Mucho Punk Rock N' Roll.

In 2007, the band played Insubordination Fest, play a set of their original songs, and sets backing up Screeching Weasel singer Ben Weasel, and former Queers singer Wimpy Rutherford. CD/DVD sets from the show of The Guts and Wimpy Rutherford with The Guts, were released on Insubordination Records in 2008. That year they would also release what would be their last full-length album, Let it Go, which was recorded at Butch Vig's Smart Studios.

=== The Connection ===
Palmer started The Connection in 2011 with Brad Marino. The Connection's debut album New England's Newest Hit Makers was released in the summer of 2011. The band has toured Europe twice and has gained a following in the power pop genre, playing shows with The Flamin' Groovies, Mark Lindsay, Richie Ramone, The Figgs, Muck and The Mires and Paul Collins of The Nerves and The Paul Collins Beat. The Connection's song "Seven Nights to Rock" was picked by Steven Van Zandt and his SiriusXM radio show "Little Steven's Underground Garage" as the "Coolest Song in The World", which the band would also receive three more times over the next year with the Marino/Palmer compositions "Comes 'n' Goes," "Crawling From The Wreckage of A Saturday Night," and "Girls In This Town".

In early 2014, the Rock and Roll Hall of Fame and Museum selected The Connection to perform at its 11th annual "It's Only Rock and Roll" Spring Benefit to "an exclusive audience of 1,000 Rock and Roll Hall of Fame VIPs." The event took place at Cleveland's Public Hall (Auditorium), at which the Rock and Roll Hall of Fame Induction ceremony is held, proceeds of which went to the Rock and Roll Hall of Fame and Museum's music education activities.

=== Solo career and other endeavors ===
Geoff Palmer released his first solo album Don't Stop in 2010. In early 2011, he collaborated on a folk punk solo project with other musicians around Portsmouth called The Geoff Useless (Band).

In 2012, Palmer founded Collector's Club Records with fellow New England musician Kurt Baker. The label has released albums and singles by The Connection, Baker, and Wimpy and The Medallions, which features the original vocalist for The Queers Wimpy Rutherford.

In November 2013, Palmer, Brad Marino, and Kurt Baker released a two-track CD as The New Trocaderos, again receiving "Coolest Song In The World" status from Steven Van Zandt. In September 2014, the trio recorded a second EP entitled "Kick Your Ass." On January 4, 2015, the song "Dream Girl" was named "Coolest Song In The World" yet again; the thirteenth time (including four Kurt Baker "Coolest Songs" and one Kris Rodgers "Coolest Song") that a song featuring Palmer went on to receive "Coolest Song" honors.

On August 13, 2018, Geoff signed with Stardumb Records and has released five albums with them to date.

In 2022, Palmer contributed to the ongoing Ramones tribute series by covering the infamous 1989 Dee Dee King rap album Standing in the Spotlight, released on Dee Dee's birthday through Stardumb Records. Dee Dee's wife, Vera Ramone, who the song Baby Doll is written for, provided a quote for the LP's hype sticker:

"This tribute album to the late and great DEE DEE RAMONE/KING by GEOFF PALMER is just as fun and entertaining as the original from 1989. Geoff and his bandmates have done a fantastic rendition of "Standing in the Spotlight" with a fresh and updated spin. I'm sure Dee Dee would feel honored and proud by this kind gesture, just as I am. Many thanks from both of us! - Vera Ramone King (a/k/a Baby Doll)."

== Personal life ==
Palmer currently lives in Madison, Wisconsin.

== Discography ==
=== The Queers ===
- Everything's OK – The Queers (1998) Hopeless Records
- Punk Rock Confidential – The Queers (1998) Hopeless Records
- "Split 7inch with The Adam Age" (2009) Asian Man Records

=== The Nobodys ===
- I've Been Everywhere – The Nobodys (2000) Suburban Home Records

=== JJ Nobody and The Regulars ===
- "Rock 'n' Roll Doesn't End At 2:00" (2001) Hopeless Records

=== The Drunken Cholos ===
- Livin La Vida Loca – The Drunken Cholos (2001) Hopeless Records

=== The Guts ===
- Sensitive side of The Guts (LP) (2001)
- Say Goodbye to Fun (LP) (2003)
- So What If We're On DBD? (EP) (2003)
- Sometimes You Just Can't Win (Compilation) (2006)
- Mucho Punk Rock N' Roll (EP) (2006)
- Stickin' With It (split w/ The Prozacs) (EP) (2007)
- Let it Go (LP) (2008)
- Insubordination Fest 2007 (Live) (2008)
- Insubordination Fest 2007 (w/ Wimpy Rutherford) (Live) (2008)
- A Safe Return to the Forest (split w/ The Jizz Kids) (EP) (2009)
- Songs Of Freedom (LP) (2012)
- O.F.S.C. (Single) (2023)

=== Solo ===
- Tell Me What – EP – Geoff Useless (2009) Livid Records
- Don't Stop – Geoff Useless / Geoff Palmer (2010) Livid Records
- This One's Gonna Be Hot – Vinyl EP – Geoff Palmer (2019) Vinyl (Stardumb Records)
- Pulling Out All The Stops LP – Geoff Palmer (2019) Vinyl (Stardumb Records)/ CD (Rum Bar)
- Many More Drugs – Vinyl EP – Geoff Palmer (2021) Vinyl (Stardumb Records)
- Charts & Graphs LP – Geoff Palmer (2021) Vinyl (Stardumb Records)/ CD (Rum Bar)
- Standing in the Spotlight LP – Geoff Palmer (2022) Vinyl / CD (Stardumb Records)
- An Otherwise Negative Situation LP – Geoff Palmer (2023) Vinyl / CD (Stardumb Records)
- Live At Punk Rock Raduno LP – Geoff Palmer (2024) Vinyl - Punk Rock Raduno Records
- Kodak Flash 12 inch EP – Geoff Palmer (2025) Vinyl (Stardumb Records)

=== Geoff Palmer & Lucy Ellis ===
- In Spite of Ourselves single – Geoff Palmer & Lucy Ellis (2020)
- "Your Face is Weird" - album – Geoff Palmer & Lucy Ellis (2020) vinyl Stardumb / CD Rum Bar

=== The Connection ===
- Stop Talking EP – The Connection (2011) Fun With Asbestos Records
- New England's Newest Hit Makers – The Connection (2011) Collector's Club Records
- Seven Nights To Rock EP – The Connection (2012) Collector's Club Records
- split with The Cry – The Connection (2013) Mooster Records
- "The Connection" – The Connection (2013) King Yum Records
- "Crawling from the Wreckage of a Saturday Night" – The Connection Collector's Club Records
- "Let It Rock" – The Connection (2013) King Yum Records
- "A Christmas Gift For" – The Connection (2014)
- "Labor of Love" – The Connection (2015)
- "Just For Fun" – The Connection (2016)
- "Wish You Success" – The Connection (2018)

=== Kurt Baker ===
- "Dance With Me Tonight / I Don't Wanna Get Involved" 45 Kurt Baker (2011) Torreznetes Entertainment
- Rocking for a Living – Kurt Baker CD/LP (2011)
- Want You Around – 45 Kurt Baker (2012) Jolly Ronnie Records
- Brand New Beat – Kurt Baker (2012) CD/LP Collector's Club Records
- "Girls Got Money / Yeah? Yeah!" 45 – Kurt Baker (2013) Collector's Club Records
- Play it Cool – Kurt Baker CD/LP (2015)
- The Lost Weekend EP – Kurt Baker (2017)
- "After Party" – Kurt Baker CD/LP (2020) (Wicked Cool Records)
- "Keep It Tight" 45/EP (2021) (Wicked Cool Records)
- "Rock N Roll Club" CD/LP (2023) (Wicked Cool Records)
- "Anchors Up" 45/EP (2023) (Wicked Cool Records)
- "LIVE AT SALA Z" – Kurt Baker CD/LP (2024) Hundreds of Records

=== KEWPID ===
- TUNNEL OF LOVE b/w STAR CROSSED EP – (cas)single (2021) Memorable But Not Honorable Tapes

=== Wimpy and The Medallions ===
- Still Headed Nowhere – Wimpy and The Medallions (2013) Collector's Club Records

=== The New Trocaderos ===
- "Money Talks / The Kids" (2013)
- Kick Your Ass EP (2014)
- Frenzy in the Hips EP (2015)
- Thrills & Chills LP (2015)
