= Off with Their Heads (band) =

American punk rock band

Off With Their Heads
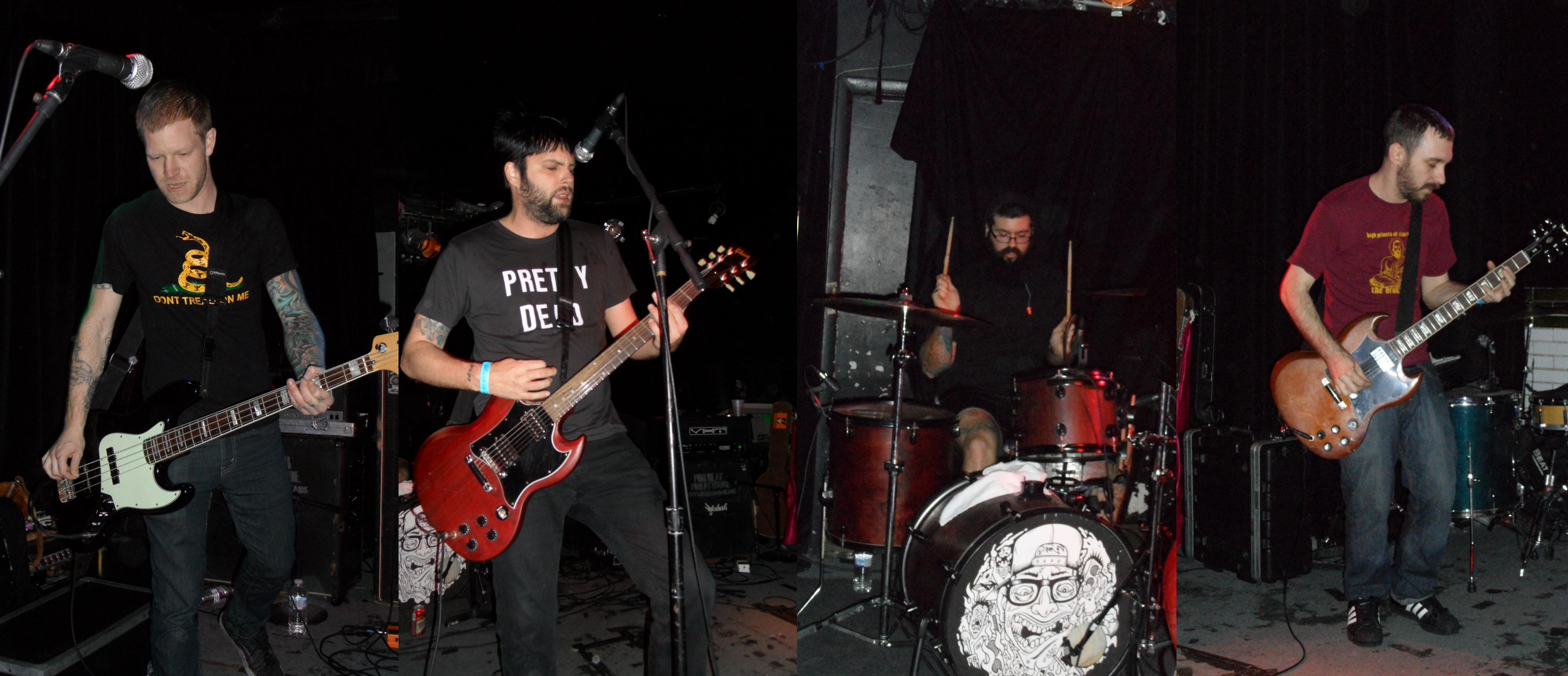
- Chicago 2013

Background information
- Origin: Minneapolis, Minnesota, U.S.
- Genres: Punk rock; melodic hardcore; hardcore punk
- Years active: 2002–present
- Labels: Epitaph Records; No Idea Records; Chunksaah Records; Recess Records
- Members: Ryan Young; Kyle Manning; Kevin Rotter
- Past members: John Polydoros; Robbie Smartwood; Erik Siljander; Paddy Costello; Alex Ulloa; Nate Gangelhoff; Zack Gontard; Mike Rose; Dan Jensen; Josh Jordan; Dave Strait; Jim Domenici; Paul Anderson; Mark Borders; Ryan Fisher; Steve Port; Mario Bourzac; Mike Yannich; Justin Francis; Trent Langill
- Website: Official Website

Off With Their Heads is an American punk rock band formed in 2002 from Minneapolis, Minnesota, United States. Since their formation, they have often featured a rotating line-up of tour players, due to members of the band often touring with other music acts. Singer/guitarist Ryan Young has noted that having different musicians helps keep the band fresh.

== History ==
On September 10, 2008, Off With Their Heads self-released a music video for "Fuck This, I'm Out"

In late 2009, the band was chosen as one of Beyond Race Magazine's "50 Emerging Artists," resulting in a spot in the publication's No. 11 issue (with Bodega Girls and J. Cole on the cover), as well as an exclusive Q&A for the magazine's site.

In February 2010, it was announced that Off With Their Heads signed to Epitaph Records, with a new record due for June 1 of that year.

After Ryan Young suffered a nervous breakdown, the band dropped off of a Canadian Tour with The Flatliners in late 2013. The band took extended time from touring and only played sporadic shows over the course of 2014, later returning to the road in 2015.

According to the No Idea website, the band had planned to release The '69 Sound, a second singles collection of more recent split 7-inch material. However, this has since been refuted by No Idea, who commented saying "This thing will never happen."

In 2016 Ryan Young and Polydoros embarked on an acoustic tour in support of their acoustic album "Won't Be Missed"

In August 2019 the band released their fourth full-length album "Be Good" and a nationwide tour followed, many dates which were canceled due to the 2020 COVID-19 pandemic. The band announced in May 2020 that due to the COVID-19 pandemic they would not be playing anymore live shows in 2020. In May 2020 the band put out their second acoustic album "Character" which features old and new Off With Their Heads songs as well as covers performed by a once again changed OWTH lineup.

In 2023 the band toured with Canadian band Single Mothers.

=== Line-up ===
While the line-up has never been stable, in addition to Ryan Young, the band also included Justin Francis for most of its history. Though Francis eventually stopped touring with OWTH, he continued to write and record songs as the band's drummer and had played on every Off With Their Heads album through 2013's “Home.” Similarly, Zack Gontard (who joined in 2006) no longer toured with the band, he remained their guitarist (and backing vocalist) for the purpose of recording through 2013. 2019's “Be Good” is the first album to not feature the pair.

=== Anxious and Angry ===
In March 2014 Ryan Young launched a podcast and online retail store titled Anxious and Angry. The podcast previously consisted of interviews with musicians, writers, comedians, and others as well as answering fan submitted questions usually relating to mental health. Though the overall theme of the podcast is mental health though the interviews did often provide stories and other information about the guest. As of 2019 the podcast went away from the guest format and went forward with OWTH drummer Kyle Manning serving as a permanent co-host. The Anxious and Angry online retail store carries music, apparel, art, and other items from Off With Their Heads, as well as several other artists. It also serves as the exclusive distributor of the Anxious and Angry "flexi singles". The site takes its name from a lyric from the Off With Their Heads song "Nightlife".

=== 2019 Vancouver tour accident ===
At about 12:30 am on October 12, 2019, in the Downtown Eastside neighborhood of Vancouver, a member of the band had gone to retrieve the vehicle after the show. At some point returning to the venue, victim Desiree Evancio was dragged under the trailer being towed by the vehicle. Initial reports have stated that the driver was given a breathalyzer test, detained, interviewed, and released shortly afterward. Upon further investigation, a Vancouver Police spokesperson stated that "We can confirm that new evidence indicates the victim walked between the van and cargo trailer as it was stopped in traffic," further adding "the driver would not have known that this was occurring as they were driving." A police spokesperson added there was "a degree of alcohol impairment" but did not speak to whether the driver had exceeded the legal limit. Investigators were still working to determine "what role, if any, that alcohol impairment had" in the incident, but did not clarify whether they were referring to the driver, the victim, or both.

Evancio suffered extensive life-altering injuries and has undergone numerous surgeries. Doctors prognosticate that she will remain in hospital for six months to one year; a GoFundMe account is seeking to raise $1 million for associated costs.

== Releases ==
=== Studio albums ===
- From the Bottom (2008)
- In Desolation (2010)
- Home (2013)
- Won't Be Missed (Acoustic Album) (2016)
- Be Good (2019)
- Character (Acoustic Album) (2020)
- Calm / Collected (Acoustic Album, combining 'Won't Be Missed' and 'Character') (2022)

=== EPs and singles ===
- Fine Tuning The Bender 7-inch (2003)
- To Hell with This and All Of You 7-inch (2004)
- Hospitals (2006)
- High Fives for the Rapture 7-inch (2006)
- Art of the Underground Single Series 7-inch (2006)
- Trying to Breathe 7-inch (2010)
- I Will Follow You (shaped picture disc) (2010)

=== Flexi singles ===
- Harsh Realm (Laura Jane Grace cover) red Flexi-Disc single (2014)
- Communist Daughter (Neutral Milk Hotel cover) blue Flexi-Disc single (2014)
- On the Attack (Langhorne Slim and the Law cover) white Flexi-Disc single (2015)
- Sorrow (Bad Religion cover) black Flexi-Disc single (2015)
- Broken Songs (Jim Ward cover) green Flexi-Disc single (2016)
- Theme Song (Acoustic) green Flexi-Disc single (2016)
- Wonder Beer (Naked Raygun Cover Featuring Deadaires) (2017)
- Straight to Hell (Hank III cover) yellow Flexi-Disc single (2018)
- Why Do We (Samiam cover) picture blue Flexi-disc single (2018)
- Stay with Me (The Dictators cover) picture black Flexi-disc single (2019)
- My Own Summer/Shove It (Deftones cover) picture blue Flexi-disc single (2020)

=== Live albums ===
- Insubordination Fest 2008 CD/DVD (2008)
- Live at the Atlantic Series: Vol. Two 7-inch (2009)
- Jump Start Records Live: Volume 4 (Digital Exclusive)(2011)
- Live from the Rock Room (Vinyl Exclusive) (2018)
- Don't tell me how to (2020)
- Live Dec 9th 2017 (2020)

=== Splits ===
- J Church Split 7-inch (“Grin and Bear It”) (2006)
- Blotto Split 7-inch (2007)
- Practice Split 7-inch (2007)
- Four Letter Word Split 7-inch (“One For the Road”) (2007)
- Dear Landlord Split 7-inch (2007)
- Dukes of Hillsborough Split 7-inch (2007)
- The Measure [SA] Split 7-inch (2007)
- Tiltwheel Split 7-inch (2007)
- Small Pool Records 4 Way Split Series Vol. 1 12-inch (2007)
- Under the Influence Lemuria split 7-inch (2009)
- Detournement Split 7-inch (2010)
- No Friends Split 6" (2010)
- Riverboat Gamblers and Dead to Me Split 7-inch (2011)
- Discharge Split 7-inch (2012)
- Morning Glory Split 7-inch (2013)
- Crusades Split Flexi-Disc (2017)

=== Compilation albums ===
- All Things Move Toward Their End (Compilation of split 7-inch tracks and compilation appearances)(2007)
- Password Is Password (Compilation of Flexi-disc series Covers) (Digital Exclusive) (2020)

=== Compilation appearances ===
- "S.O.S." Twin Cities Hardcore: Bring It Together (2006)
- "Goddamn Job" We'll Inherit the Earth...A Tribute to the Replacements (2006)
- “Please Don't Call the Cops on Me” and “Big Mouth” Art of the Underground Single Series Volume:2 (2006)
- "I May Be a Lot of Shitty Things, but at Least I'm Not a Rapist Like You" ,"My Everyday Life", and "Die Young" The 4-Way Split Series Chapter One (2007)
- "Idiot" My Life in a Jugular Vein (2007)
- "I Am You" No Idea Presents: Fest 7 (2008)
- "Headlights...Ditch!" Let Them Know (2009)
- "I Am You"” Skate Rock Vol. 1 (2009)
- "Go On Git Now" Husk! Husk! Twin Cities Scene Comp (2009)
- "Hard to Admit" (Recorded Live At The Atlantic No Idea Presents: Fest 8 (2009)
- "I Am You" Punk Rock Pot Luck Vol. #2 Punk Rock Review (2009)
- "Scarred By Love" Four Score and Four Shitty Label Compilations Ago... (2009)
- "NicFit" My America: A Tribute to Quincy Punx to Benefit The West Memphis Three (2010)
- "Next in Line" Untitled 21: A juvenile Tribute to Swingin' Utters (2010)
- "Rikki Rae" Terminal Decay (2012)
- "Nightlife" Rock Sound 100% Vol. #17 (2013)
- "Nightlife" Groezrock '15 Sampler (2015)

=== Music videos ===
- "Fuck This, I'm Out" (2008)
- "Keep Falling Down" (2009)
- "Drive" (2010)
- "Clear the Air" (2011)
- "Nightlife" (2013)
- "Seek Advice Elsewhere" (2013)
- "Start Walking" (2013)
- "Don't Make Me Go" (2013)
- "Disappear" (2019)
- "No Love" (2019)
- "Be Good" (2020)
- "Let It All" (2021)
