= Stardumb Records =

Dutch independent record label

- Founder: Stefan Tijs
- Distributor(s): Sonic Rendezvous
- Genre: Punk, Pop punk
- Country of origin: The Netherlands
- Official website: http://www.stardumbrecords.com/

Stardumb Records is a small independent record label based in Rotterdam, The Netherlands that was launched in 2000. It is regarded as the best known European label specializing in 1990s-style pop-punk.

== History ==
Stardumb Records started its operation in 2000. Their first release was a 7-inch by local band The Apers, and releases by similar pop punk bands inspired by the sound of Lookout! Records artists followed. Their roster included Italy's The Manges, and Retarded, and the UK's Zatopeks while they also released records by US bands like The Groovie Ghoulies, The Methadones, The Queers, Geoff Palmer as well as Darlington. Stardumb is the best known European label for this type of music. Their releases have been reviewed by numerous publications.

== Notable bands ==
- The Apers
- Darlington
- The Groovie Ghoulies
- The Manges
- The Methadones
- The Queers
- Geoff Palmer

== See also ==
- List of record labels
