= 1967 in Michigan =

- Decades: 1940s; 1950s; 1960s; 1970s; 1980s
- See also: History of Michigan; Historical outline of Michigan; List of years in Michigan; 1967 in the United States

Events from the year 1967 in Michigan.

The Associated Press (AP) rated the top stories in Michigan for 1967 as follows:

1. Civil rights, including the 1967 Detroit riot, smaller disturbances in Pontiac, Flint, Grand Rapids, Jackson, and Benton Harbor, and the fight in the Michigan Legislature for an open housing law;
2. Gov. George W. Romney's November 18 announcement that he was a candidate for the Presidency of the United States and his campaign for the 1968 Republican Presidential nomination;
3. The Michigan Legislature's enacting a state income tax in July, taxing personal income at 2.6% and corporate income at 9.6%;
4. Teachers strikes in Detroit and elsewhere that closed schools in September and part of October for more than half a million students;
5. The Coho salmon boom after the species was introduced to the state's waters, drawing large crowds to the state's resort areas in the fall, and a September storm that killed seven fishermen near Frankfort;
6. Problems in the automobile industry, including lower sales, price increases, safety issues, a two-month strike at Ford Motor Co., local strikes that halted production by Chrysler, and negotiation of new contracts with the United Auto Workers (UAW) that provided for $4.70 per hour wage increases and $1.00 per hour benefits increases over three years;
7. A Teamsters strike resulting in violence, including one death in Michigan, against truckers refusing to honor the strike;
8. The selection of Robben Wright Fleming as President of the University of Michigan;
9. Blizzards that struck the state in January and February; and
10. An investigation into the Michigan Highway Department.

The AP and United Press International (UPI) also selected the state's top sports stories as follows:

1. The 1967 Detroit Tigers season, ending with a close race for the American League pennant, finishing in second place, one game behind the Boston Red Sox (AP-1, UPI-1);
2. The selection of Joe Schmidt as the Detroit Lions' head coach (UPI-2), and his signing a five-year contract to serve in that position (AP-3);
3. The collapse of the 1967 Michigan State Spartans football team, compiling a 3–7 record after two consecutive years contending for the national championship (AP-2, UPI-6);
4. The selection of Dave Bing as the NBA Rookie of the Year (AP-8, UPI-4);
5. The surprise retirement of Detroit Red Wings' goalie Roger Crozier on November 10 (AP-10 [tie], UPI-3);
6. Alumni unhappiness over the 4–6 record compiled by the 1967 Michigan Wolverines football team (AP-4);
7. Mel Farr who finished fifth in rushing in the NFL and was selected by the UPI as the NFL Rookie of the Year (UPI-5);
8. The Michigan high school basketball tournament (AP-5);
9. The 1966–67 Detroit Red Wings' failure to make the playoffs for the first time in five years (AP-6);
10. The Detroit Lions' trade of defensive tackle Roger Brown to the Los Angeles Rams (UPI-7);
11. Julius Boros' victory at the Buick Open (AP-7);
12. Earl Wilson's compiling a 22-11 record as a starting pitcher for the Detroit Tigers (UPI-8);
13. The Detroit Pistons' hiring of Donnie Butcher as head coach to take over from Dave DeBusschere (AP-9);
14. The brilliant pitching of Mickey Lolich for the Detroit Tigers during the pennant run (UPI-9); and
15. The 1966–67 Michigan State Spartans men's basketball team's Big Ten Conference co-championship (AP-10 [tie], UPI-10),
16. The Northern Michigan Wildcats' invitation to the NAIA football playoffs (AP-10 [tie]).

== Office holders ==
=== State office holders ===
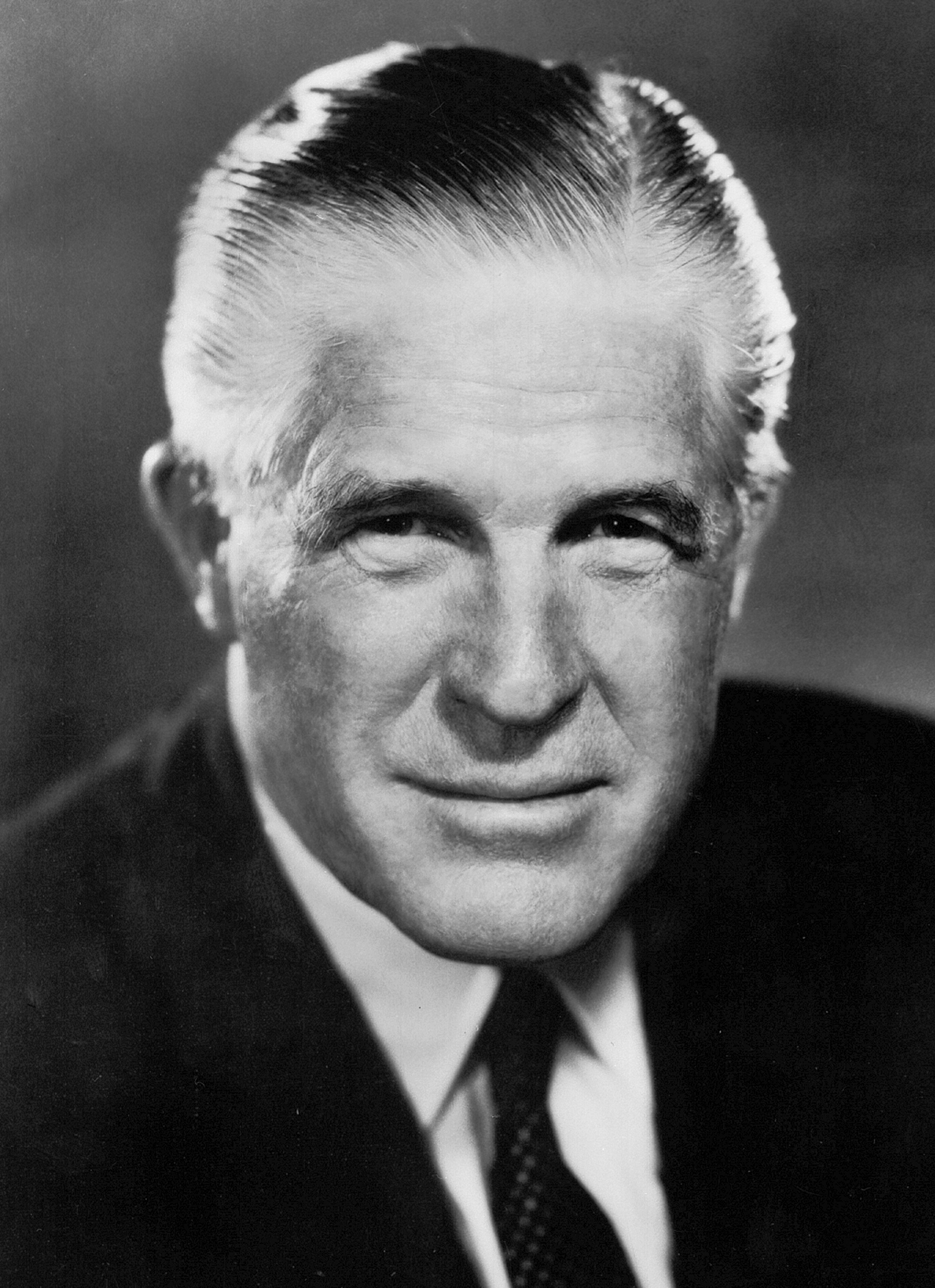
Gov. Romney

- Governor of Michigan: George W. Romney (Republican)
- Lieutenant Governor of Michigan: William Milliken (Republican)
- Michigan Attorney General: Frank J. Kelley (Democrat)
- Michigan Secretary of State: James M. Hare (Democrat)
- Speaker of the Michigan House of Representatives: Robert E. Waldron (Republican)
- Majority Leader of the Michigan Senate: Emil Lockwood (Republican)
- Chief Justice, Michigan Supreme Court: Thomas M. Kavanagh/John R. Dethmers

=== Mayors of major cities ===
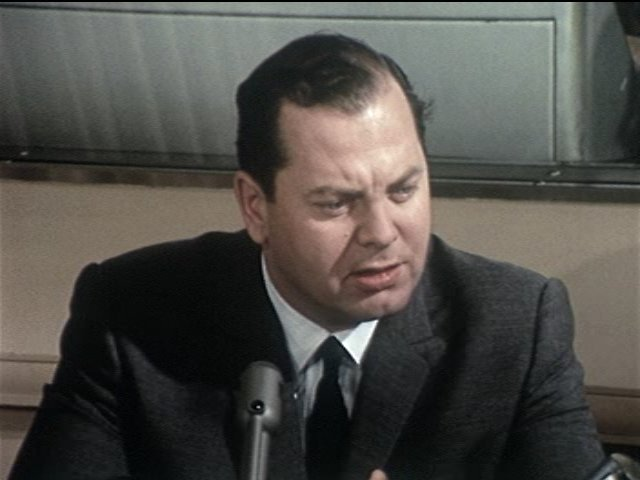
Mayor Cavanagh

- Mayor of Detroit: Jerome Cavanagh
- Mayor of Grand Rapids: C. H. Sonneveldt
- Mayor of Warren, Michigan: Ted Bates
- Mayor of Flint: Floyd J. McCree
- Mayor of Saginaw: James W. Stenglein/Henry G. Marsh
- Mayor of Dearborn: Orville L. Hubbard
- Mayor of Lansing: Max E. Murninghan
- Mayor of Ann Arbor: Wendell Hulcher (Republican)

=== Federal office holders ===
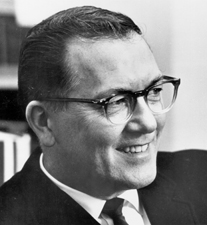
Sen. Griffin

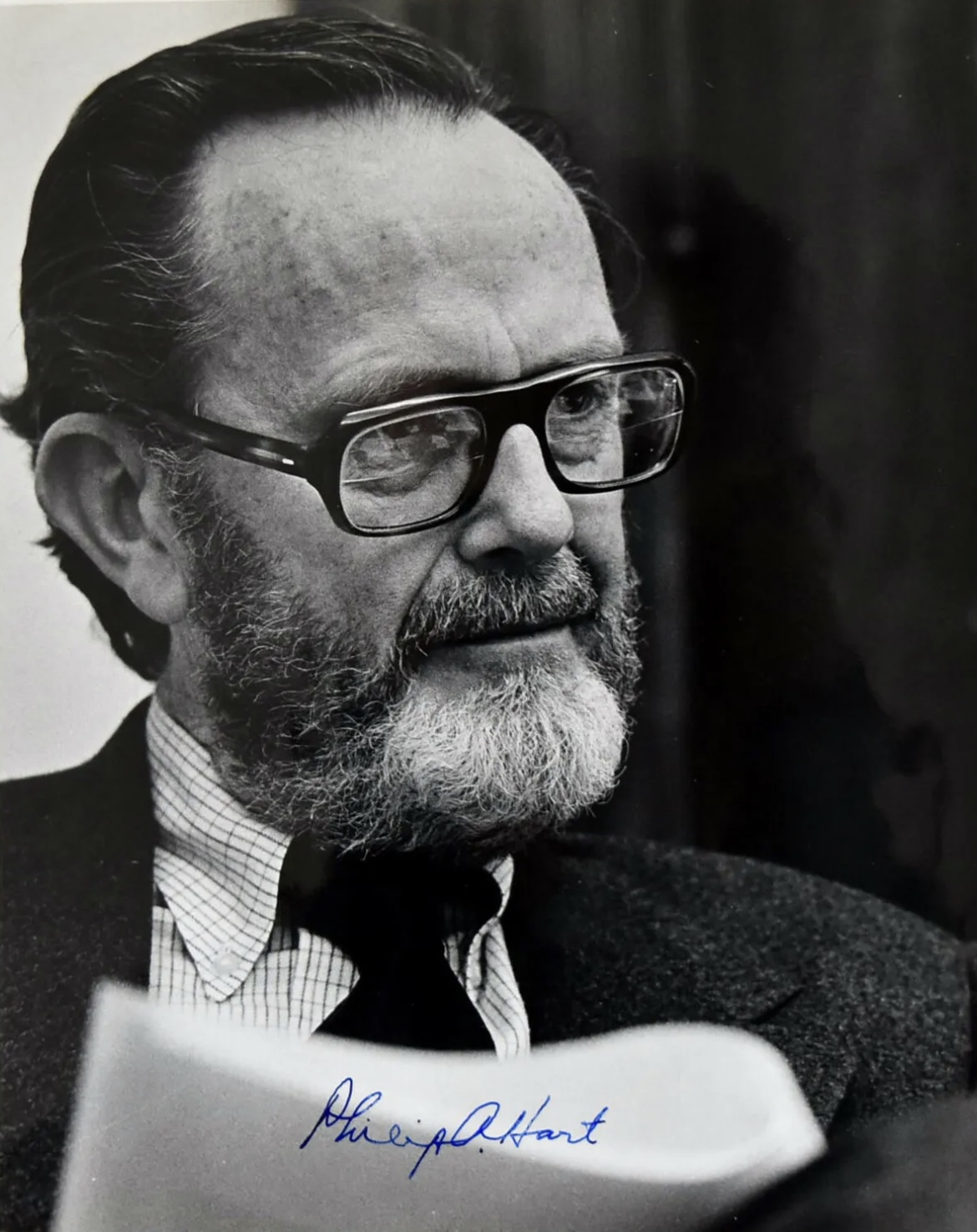
Sen. Hart

- U.S. Senator from Michigan: Robert P. Griffin (Republican)
- U.S. Senator from Michigan: Philip Hart (Democrat)
- House District 1: John Conyers (Democrat)
- House District 2: Marvin L. Esch (Republican)
- House District 3: Garry E. Brown (Republican)
- House District 4: J. Edward Hutchinson (Republican)
- House District 5: Gerald Ford (Republican)
- House District 6: Charles E. Chamberlain (Republican)
- House District 7: Donald W. Riegle Jr. (Republican)
- House District 8: R. James Harvey (Republican)
- House District 9: Guy Vander Jagt (Republican)
- House District 10: Elford Albin Cederberg (Republican)
- House District 11: Philip Ruppe (Republican)
- House District 12: James G. O'Hara (Democrat)
- House District 13: Charles Diggs (Democrat)
- House District 14: Lucien N. Nedzi (Democrat)
- House District 15: William D. Ford (Democrat)
- House District 16: John Dingell Jr. (Democrat)
- House District 17: Martha Griffiths (Democrat)
- House District 18: William Broomfield (Republican)
- House District 19: Jack H. McDonald (Republican)

== Population ==
In the 1960 United States census, Michigan was recorded as having a population of 7,823,194 persons, ranking as the seventh most populous state in the country. By 1970, the state's population had grown 13.4% to 8,875,083 persons.

=== Cities ===
The following is a list of cities in Michigan with a population of at least 60,000 based on 1960 U.S. Census data. Historic census data from 1950 and 1970 is included to reflect trends in population increases or decreases. Cities that are part of the Detroit metropolitan area are shaded in tan.

1960 Rank	City	County	1950 Pop.	1960 Pop.	1970 Pop.	Change 1960-70
1	Detroit	Wayne	1,849,568	1,670,144	1,514,063	−9.3% ▼
2	Flint	Genesee	163,143	196,940	193,317	−1.8% ▼
3	Grand Rapids	Kent	176,515	177,313	197,649	11.5% ▲
4	Dearborn	Wayne	94,994	112,007	104,199	−7.0% ▼
5	Lansing	Ingham	92,129	107,807	131,403	21.9% ▲
6	Saginaw	Saginaw	92,918	98,265	91,849	−6.5% ▼
7	Warren	Macomb	42,653	89,246	179,260	100.2% ▲
8	Pontiac	Oakland	73,681	82,233	85,279	3.7% ▲
9	Kalamazoo	Kalamazoo	57,704	82,089	85,555	4.1% ▲
10	Royal Oak	Oakland	46,898	80,612	86,238	7.0% ▲
11	St. Clair Shores	Macomb	19,823	76,657	88,093	14.9% ▲
12	Ann Arbor	Washtenaw	48,251	67,340	100,035	48.6% ▲
13	Livonia	Wayne	17,634	66,702	110,109	65.1% ▲
14	Dearborn Heights	Wayne	20,235	61,118	80,069	31.0% ▲
15	Westland	Wayne	30,407	60,743	86,749	42.8% ▲

=== Counties ===
The following is a list of counties in Michigan with populations of at least 100,000 based on 1960 U.S. Census data. Historic census data from 1950 and 1970 are included to reflect trends in population increases or decreases. Counties that are part of the Detroit metropolitan area are shaded in tan.

1960 Rank	County	Largest city	1950 Pop.	1960 Pop.	1970 Pop.	Change 1960-70
1	Wayne	Detroit	2,435,235	2,666,297	2,666,751	0.0% ▲
2	Oakland	Pontiac	396,001	690,259	907,871	31.5% ▲
3	Macomb	Warren	184,961	405,804	625,309	54.1% ▲
4	Genesee	Flint	270,963	374,313	444,341	18.7% ▲
5	Kent	Grand Rapids	288,292	363,187	411,044	13.2% ▲
6	Ingham	Lansing	172,941	211,296	261,039	23.5% ▲
7	Saginaw	Saginaw	153,515	190,752	219,743	15.2% ▲
8	Washtenaw	Ann Arbor	134,606	172,440	234,103	35.8% ▲
9	Kalamazoo	Kalamazoo	126,707	169,712	201,550	18.8% ▲
10	Berrien	Benton Harbor	115,702	149,865	163,875	9.3% ▲
11	Calhoun	Battle Creek	120,813	138,858	141,963	2.2% ▲
12	Jackson	Jackson	108,168	131,994	143,274	8.5% ▲
13	Muskegon	Muskegon	121,545	129,943	157,426	21.2% ▲
14	St. Clair	Port Huron	91,599	107,201	120,175	12.1% ▲
15	Bay	Bay City	88,461	107,042	117,339	9.6% ▲
16	Monroe	Monroe	75,666	101,120	118,479	17.2% ▲

== Sports ==
=== Baseball ===
- 1967 Detroit Tigers season – Under manager Mayo Smith, the Tigers compiled a 91–71 record and finished second the American League, one game behind the Boston Red Sox. The team's statistical leaders included Al Kaline with a .308 batting average, 25 home runs, and 78 RBIs, and Earl Wilson with 22 wins, and Mike Marshall a 1.98 earned run average.
- 1967 Michigan Wolverines baseball team - Under head coach Moby Benedict, the Wolverines compiled a 24–12 record and finished second in the Big Ten Conference.

=== American football ===
- 1967 Detroit Lions season – The Lions, under head coach Joe Schmidt, compiled a 5–7–2 record and finished in third place in the NFL's Central Division. The team's statistical leaders included Milt Plum with 925 passing yards, Mel Farr with 860 rushing yards, Bill Malinchak with 397 receiving yards, and Mel Farr and Tom Nowatzke, each with 36 points scored.
- 1967 Michigan Wolverines football team – Under head coach Bump Elliott, the Wolverines compiled a 4–6 record. The team's statistical leaders included Dennis Brown with 928 passing yards, Ron Johnson with 1,005 rushing yards and 42 points scored, and Jim Berline with 624 receiving yards.
- 1967 Michigan State Spartans football team – Under head coach Duffy Daugherty, the Spartans compiled a 3–7 record.
- 1967 Central Michigan Chippewas football team – Under head coach Roy Kramer, the Chippewas compiled an 8–2 record and were Interstate Intercollegiate Athletic Conference co-champions.
- 1967 Eastern Michigan Hurons football team – Under head coach Dan Boisture, the Hurons compiled a 6–3 record.
- 1967 Western Michigan Broncos football team – Under head coach Bill Doolittle, the Broncos compiled a 5–4 record.

=== Basketball ===
- 1966–67 Detroit Pistons season – Under head coach Dave DeBusschere and Donnie Butcher, the Pistons compiled a 30–51 record. The team's statistical leaders included Dave Bing with 1,601 points and 330 assists and Dave DeBusschere with 924 rebounds.
- 1966–67 Michigan State Spartans men's basketball team – Under head coach John E. Benington, the Spartans compiled a 16–7 record.
- 1966–67 Michigan Wolverines men's basketball team – Under head coach Dave Strack, the Wolverines compiled an 8–16 record. Craig Dill led the team with 471 points and 209 rebounds.
- 1966–67 Detroit Titans men's basketball team – The Titans compiled a 10–15 record under head coach Bob Calihan.
- 1966–67 Western Michigan Broncos men's basketball team – Under head coach Clarence Sonny Means, the Broncos compiled a 10–14 record.

=== Ice hockey ===
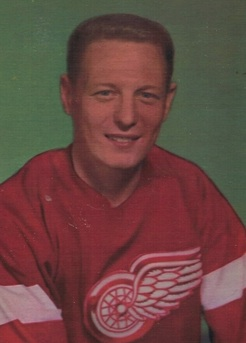
Bruce MacGregor

- 1966–67 Detroit Red Wings season – Under head coach Sid Abel, the Red Wings compiled a 27–39–4 record and finished sixth in the National Hockey League's East Division. The team's statistical leaders included Bruce MacGregor with 28 goals and Norm Ullman with 44 assists and 70 points. The team's regular goaltender was Roger Crozier.
- 1966–67 Michigan Wolverines men's ice hockey season – Under head coach Al Renfrew, the Wolverines compiled a 19–7–2 record.
- 1966–67 Michigan Tech Huskies men's ice hockey team – Under head coach John MacInnes, Michigan Tech compiled an 18–11–1 record.
- 1966–67 Michigan State Spartans men's ice hockey team – Under head coach Amo Bessone, the Spartans compiled a 16–15–1 record and finished third at the 1967 NCAA Division I Men's Ice Hockey Tournament.

=== Golf ===
- Buick Open –
- Michigan Open –

=== Boat racing ===
- Port Huron to Mackinac Boat Race –
- Spirit of Detroit race –
- APBA Gold Cup –

=== Other ===
- 1967 NCAA Indoor Track and Field Championships – The third annual NCAA indoor championships were held at Cobo Arena in Detroit in March; USC won the team championship.

== Music ==
Michigan and/or Motown acts performed 16 of the songs ranked on the Billboard Year-End Hot 100 singles of 1967, as follows:

- "I Think We're Alone Now" by Tommy James and the Shondells (No. 12);
- "Respect" by Aretha Franklin (No. 13);
- "I Was Made to Love Her" by Stevie Wonder (No. 14);
- "Love Is Here and Now You're Gone" by The Supremes (No. 26);
- "The Happening" by The Supremes (No. 29);
- "Your Precious Love" by Marvin Gaye and Tammi Terrell (No. 32);
- "Jimmy Mack" by Martha and the Vandellas (No. 36);
- "Reflections by The Supremes (No. 41);
- "(Your Love Keeps Lifting Me) Higher and Higher" by Jackie Wilson (No. 53);
- "You're My Everything by The Temptations (No. 56);
- "Baby I Love You" by Aretha Franklin (No. 59);
- "I Never Loved a Man (The Way I Love You)" by Aretha Franklin (No. 75);
- "Bernadette" by the Four Tops (No. 82):
- "The Beat Goes On" by Sonny & Cher (Sonny Bono a Detroit native) (No. 83);
- "Ain't No Mountain High Enough" by Marvin Gaye and Tammi Terrell (No. 87); and
- "Mirage" by Tommy James and the Shondells (No. 96).

== Births ==
- March 18 - Andre Rison, NFL wide receiver (1989–2000), in Flint
- May 15 - John Smoltz, Major League Baseball pitcher (1988–2009), in Warren
- August 2 - Aaron Krickstein, tennis player ranked No. 6 in the world in 1990, in Ann Arbor
- September 19 - Jim Abbott, Major League Baseball pitcher (1989–1999), in Flint

== Deaths ==
- January 7 - Frederick M. Alger Jr., politician and diplomat, at age 59 in Grosse Pointe
- January 27 - Roger B. Chaffee, Apollo program astronaut killed in a pre-launch test for Apollo I, at age 31 at Cape Kennedy, Florida
- January 30 - Eddie Tolan, track and field athlete who won gold medals in the 100- and 200-meter races at the 1932 Summer Olympics, at age 58 in Detroit
- March 18 - Mike Bishop, U.S. Congressman (2015–2019)
- November 3 - Clare Hoffman, U.S. Congressman (1935–1963), at age 92

=== Gallery of 1967 deaths ===
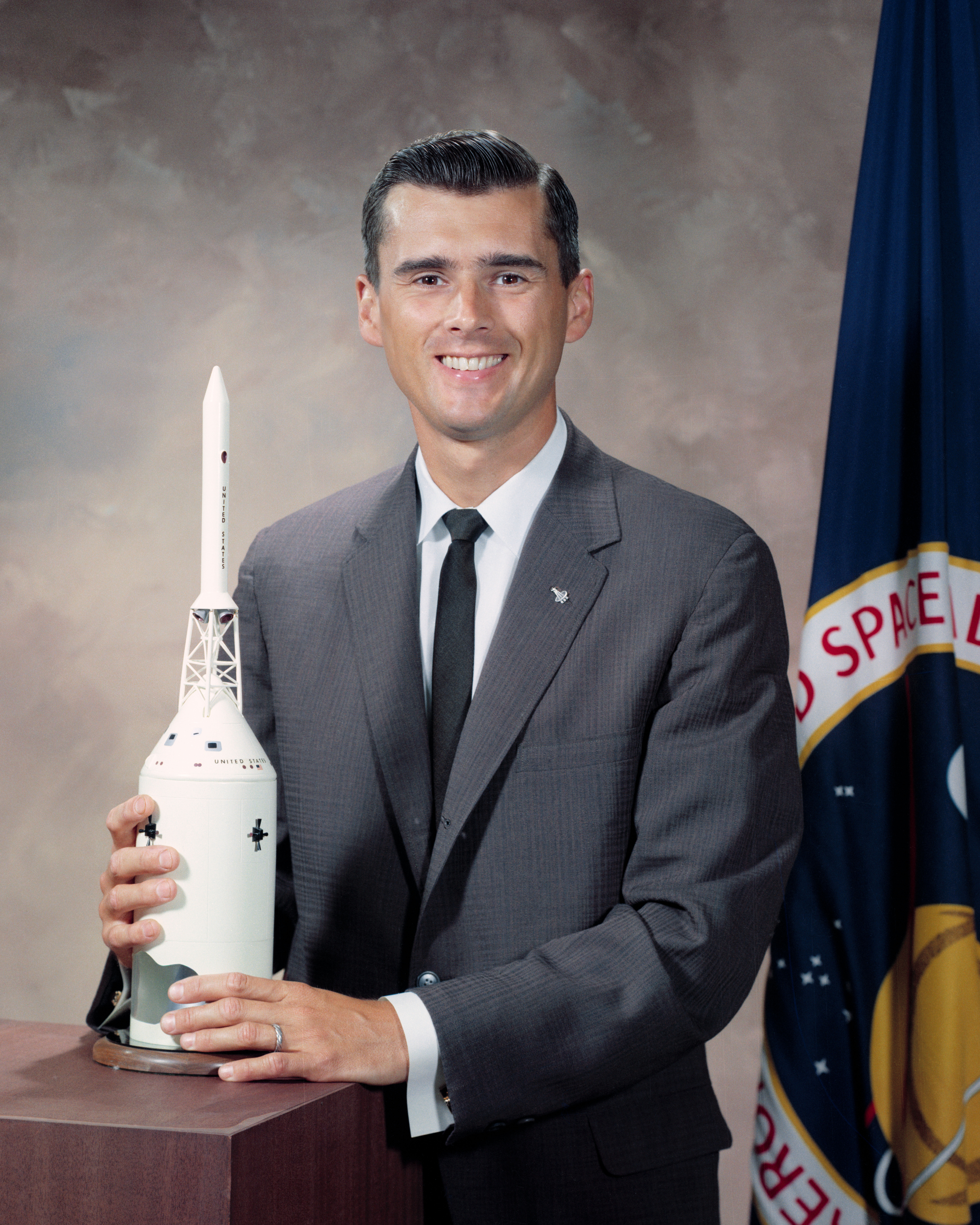
Roger B. Chaffee

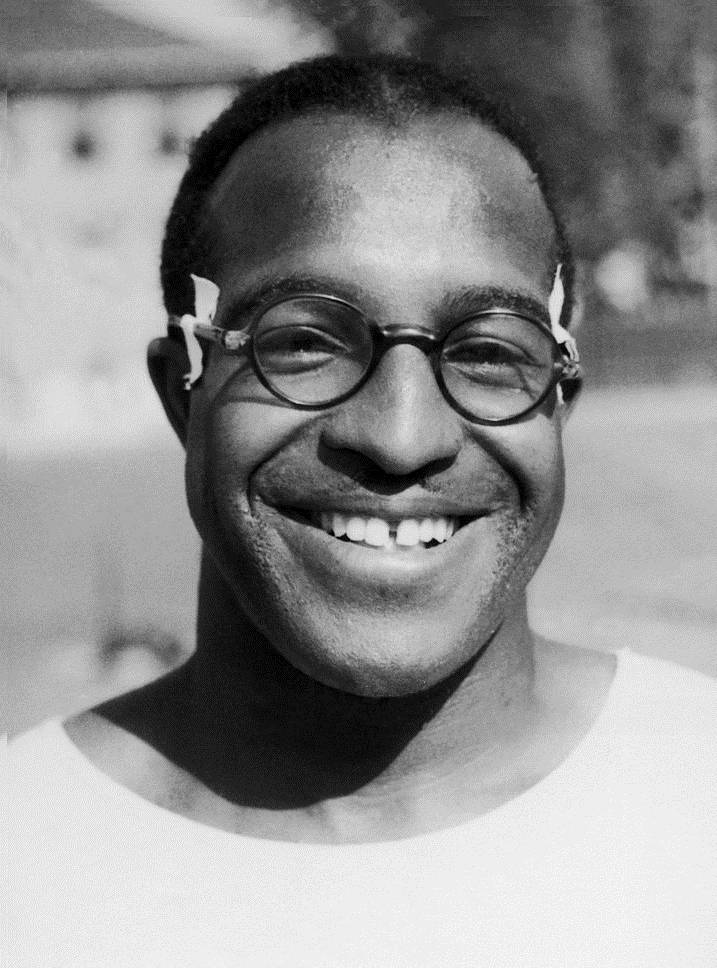
Eddie Tolan

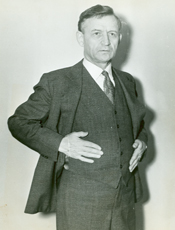
Clare Hoffman

== See also ==
- History of Michigan
- History of Detroit
