= Move Back Home =

- The original album cover, combining a live photograph of the band taken by Molly Neuman with an illustration of a dejected "Queers cat" drawn by Chris Appelgren

Studio album by the Queers
- Released: May 10, 1995
- Recorded: 1995
- Studios: Sonic Iguana, Lafayette, Indiana
- Genre: Punk rock
- Length: 32:56
- Label: Lookout! (LK 114)
- Producer: Larry Livermore

The Queers chronology
Love Ain't Punk (1995)	Move Back Home (1995)	A Day Late and a Dollar Short (1996)

Alternative cover
- Cover of the 2007 reissue

Move Back Home is the fifth studio album by the American punk rock band the Queers, released in May 1995 by Lookout! Records. The recording sessions were marred by the band members' drug problems, and many of the songs were written in the studio. Producer and Lookout! president Larry Livermore was so displeased with the result that he took his name off of the album, and several involved parties, including singer and guitarist Joe Queer, later regarded it as sub-par. After the Queers rescinded their master recordings from Lookout! in 2006, Move Back Home was reissued by Asian Man Records the following year, having been remixed and remastered by Queer and recording engineer Mass Giorgini and with the tracks from the Surf Goddess EP added.

== Recording ==
The Queers had a reputation for heavy drinking and regular drug use, including problems with heroin. Band leader Joe King (aka Joe Queer) had tried to cut back his alcohol consumption and to quit heroin, and had staged an intervention for longtime drummer Hugh O'Neill to get him to quit as well; O'Neill was forced to take a leave of absence from the band, and was absent from their cover version of the Ramones album Rocket to Russia (released as part of the Ramones covers album series) and from their 1994 album Beat Off. He rejoined the band that summer, playing on the Surf Goddess EP; Livermore produced the recording, and later recalled the sessions as being extremely enjoyable. He was excited to return to Sonic Iguana Studios in Lafayette, Indiana to record Move Back Home with the Queers and recording engineer Mass Giorgini, but soon discovered that King and O'Neill were back on drugs and that the band did not have much material written. Reflecting on the sessions in 2007, King admitted that the band was not prepared to make a record:

We were all fucked up (at least I was) and not ready to record. But Larry was dangling 5 grand in front of each of our pimply little faces and that was enough for us to crawl out of our rat holes in New Hampshire and get to the studio. The plan was to drive straight to the studio, record as fast as we could, grab the dough and bail back to the aforementioned rat holes as soon as possible, patting ourselves on the back for a job well done [...] I'll be honest; the only genius move about that time would've been to throw our asses into rehab.

Having worked with the Queers on several previous records, Livermore expected the band to have new songs already written and for the sessions to go swiftly, and was disappointed to find that this was not the case:

Joe and I had spent hours on the phone talking about the amazing new songs he was writing, but when we started recording, I discovered that only a couple of those songs actually existed. The rest were just snippets of melody or a catchy hook. In some cases, he hadn't gotten farther than a title [...] The new record was essentially written in the studio, with Mass Giorgini waiting patiently at his mixing board while we struggled to come up with ideas, riffs, and choruses. Even when something interesting did develop, Joe was seldom in the mood to pursue it. "It's fine like it is," he'd snarl when I suggested another take or some additional harmonies. It felt like his primary purpose was to get this thing done as quickly as possible and skedaddle back to the dope man in New Hampshire.

King recalled that "there were a few fights" during recording, including an incident in which he, irritable over having to get up early to work on repeated vocal takes while his bandmates slept in until the afternoon, launched into a tirade and threatened to quit the sessions. Among the songs the band recorded for the album were a cover version of the Beach Boys' 1963 single "Hawaii", and "High School Psychopath II", a sequel to Screeching Weasel's song "I Was a High School Psychopath" from their 1993 album Wiggle. With the album nearly finished, it was decided that one more song was needed, so the band elected to cover "That Girl" by Livermore's band the Potatomen. Livermore later recalled that he struggled to teach the band the song: "'Joe, it doesn't go quite like that,' I'd say, and try to get him to listen to the original recording. 'Whaddaya talking about, it sounds great,' he'd growl, and go back to playing it his way." He got a similar response when he tried to convince the band to spend a bit more time in the studio to re-record some parts and work some more on mixing; the band insisted the album sounded fine, and headed back to New Hampshire. According to King, the band wanted to title the album Next Stop Rehab, "but Lookout in their infinite stupidity made us change it. They always were party poopers."

Ultimately, Livermore was so disappointed by the recordings that he decided to remove his name from the album credits. "Move Back Home wasn't a terrible record", he wrote in his 2015 memoir. "Considering the state Joe and Hugh were in, it's impressive that it got made at all. Still, I was unhappy enough about it that I refused to let myself be credited as producer." "Larry should never have promised us the money", wrote King in 2007, saying that Screeching Weasel frontman Ben Weasel, who had produced the Queers' previous three albums, helped convince Livermore to take his name off the record. "Ben and others talked Larry into taking his name off the album as producer but we thought he did as good as anyone could have under the circumstances. Probably better."

== Artwork ==
For the album cover, Lookout!'s Chris Appelgren wanted to use a design featuring the "Queers cat" mascot he had developed for the band based on old Felix the Cat images, and had used in the artwork for Love Songs for the Retarded (1993), Beat Off (1994), and Surf Goddess (1995). The band rejected his idea, however, in favor of a live performance photograph taken by Lookout! employee Molly Neuman, who was also Appelgren's girlfriend. "I did the Beat Off artwork with some logo illustrations by [Lookout! co-owner] Patrick Hynes, and the band seemed to like the Queers cats I was making", said Appelgren in 2014; "I had borrowed some old Felix comics for the art for Loves Songs for the Retarded and was continuing the theme. It wasn't requested by them—I sort of foisted it on them. By Move Back Home they were pretty tired of it, I think [...] The art was uninspired—they wanted a live photo and threw out my idea of a Queers cat standing head down in front of a cartoon front door, looking dejected." Appelgren incorporated his "dejected cat" illustrations into the corner of the front cover, and on the album's back cover.

== Reception ==
Livermore was not the only one involved with Move Back Home who was disappointed with the album: Writing in 2007, King called both it and the Queer's previous studio album, 1994's Beat Off, "mediocre", saying they did not measure up to albums put out during the same period by the band's peers, specifically Screeching Weasel's My Brain Hurts (1991), Green Day's Dookie (1994), and the Mr. T Experience's Love Is Dead (1996). Reflecting on it in 2014, Appelgren said that "the recording wasn't that strong and while there are some great songs, it's got some weak tracks. It still did pretty well, but didn't feel like a step forward as the previous releases all did. I always appreciated records that felt like they were progressions from where the band had been before, and Move Back Home felt like a lateral record. It didn't advance the notion of the Queers." In his book Punk USA: The Rise and Fall of Lookout Records (2014), author Kevin Prested called it "the band's filler album. With punk-by-the-numbers compositions, the Queers had lost some of the flair of the two previous albums, giving the impression of rushed new songs. If Surf Goddess had been a stopgap, then perhaps with more time they could have created a more thought-out release. While not bad by any means, the band had been building up to something on another level with the fantastic Love Songs for the Retarded and Beat Off, which is probably why Move Back Home felt disappointing." Critic Robert Christgau gave the album a rating of "neither" in his Consumer Guide, marking it as an album which "may impress once or twice with consistent craft or an arresting track or two. Then it won't."

One critic who did give the album a positive review was Kembrew McLeod; Writing for AllMusic, he said "Move Back Home demonstrates that the Queers are getting better and better at channeling the black leather jacket-clad spirit of their punk forefathers [the Ramones]. They, of course, still haven't grown up — Joe still sings about not having a girlfriend and acting like a jerk, but no one else can do it better, save for the Mr. T Experience's Dr. Frank. The best demonstration of how good they've gotten at crafting great pop songs is the fact that it's hard to tell which song is a Brian Wilson cover and which one is an original."

== Reissue ==
In 2006 the Queers followed several other former Lookout! artists in rescinding their master tapes and licensing rights from the label, invoking a clause in their contract citing delinquent royalty payments. They signed to Asian Man Records, who reissued all of the band's Lookout! albums in 2007, each having been remixed and remastered by Giorgini at Sonic Iguana. King assisted with the remixing of Move Back Home, writing in the liner notes that "Mass and I remixed and used double vocals not on the original album. We beefed up the guitar sound and drums. It's way better than it was. We just did the stuff we would have done if we hadn't run off so quickly." He and Livermore wrote liner notes reflecting on the recording sessions, and Livemore restored his name to the album as its producer. The reissue was given a new cover and artwork, and the tracks from the Surf Goddess EP were added as bonus tracks.

== Track listing ==
Writing credits adapted from the album's liner notes.^{[I]}

No.	Title	Writer(s)	Length
1.	"She's a Cretin"	Joe Queer, Chris "B-Face" Barnard, Hugh O'Neill	2:10
2.	"Next Stop Rehab"	Queer, B-Face, O'Neill	2:03
3.	"High School Psychopath II"	Queer, B-Face, O'Neill	2:07
4.	"If You Only Had a Brain"	Queer, B-Face, O'Neill	1:46
5.	"I Gotta Girlfriend"	Queer, B-Face, O'Neill	2:53
6.	"Hawaii" (originally performed by the Beach Boys)	Brian Wilson, Mike Love	2:00
7.	"From Your Boy"	Queer	3:36
8.	"Definitely"	Queer	2:32
9.	"Everything's Going My Way"	Queer, B-Face, O'Neill	2:16
10.	"Cut It Dude"	Queer, B-Face, O'Neill	2:00
11.	"I Didn't Get Invited to the Prom"	Queer	3:04
12.	"That Girl" (originally performed by the Potatomen)	Larry Livermore	1:40
13.	"Peppermint Girl"	Queer	4:49
Total length:			32:56

Bonus tracks on 2007 reissue, from the Surf Goddess EP (1995)
No.	Title	Writer(s)	Length
14.	"Surf Goddess"	Queer, Ben Weasel	3:16
15.	"Mirage" (originally performed by Tommy James and the Shondells)	Ritchie Cordell	3:03
16.	"Get Over You" (originally performed by the Undertones)	John O'Neill	2:33
17.	"Quit Talkin'"	Queer	2:08
Total length:			43:56

== Personnel ==
Credits adapted from the album's liner notes.

The Queers

- Joe Queer (Joe King) – lead vocals, guitar; remixing of 2007 reissue
- B-Face (Chris Barnard) – bass guitar, backing vocals
- Hugh O'Neill – drums, backing vocals

Additional performers

- Dan Vapid – guitar on tracks from the Surf Goddess EP

Production

- Larry Livermore – producer
- Mass Giorgini – audio engineer, mixing engineer; remixing and remastering of 2007 reissue

Artwork

- Molly Neuman – cover photograph
- Chris Appelgren – illustrations and layout
- Brian Medley – interior band photograph
- Yosef Glushien – layout and logo of 2007 reissue

== Notes ==
I On the original Lookout! Records release of Move Back Home, Joe King (aka Joe Queer) is credited as writer of all tracks with the exceptions of "That Girl", written by Livermore; "Hawaii", credited to Brian Wilson; and "High School Psychopath II", credited to King, Barnard, O'Neill, and Dan Vapid. The 2007 reissue on Asian Man Records credits Barnard and O'Neill as co-writers on seven total tracks, and omits Vapid. The writing credits listed here are adapted from the Asian Man release, with the exception of "Hawaii"; on both releases this song is credited to Brian Wilson, but it was one of 35 Beach Boys songs on which Mike Love was awarded co-writer credit in 1994 as the result of the lawsuit Love v. Wilson.
