= Bo Gentry =

American singer

Robert Allan Ackoff (May 30, 1942 – June 30, 1983), known professionally as Bo Gentry, was an American pop singer, songwriter and record producer, most noted for his work with Tommy James and the Shondells in the 1960s.

== Biography ==
Gentry was born in New York City. In the early 1960s, he worked as a songwriter and producer at Kama Sutra Records. After leaving the company following a disagreement with its owner Artie Ripp, he had successes as a songwriter working with Ritchie Cordell. These included "I Think We're Alone Now" (written with Cordell, though Gentry was not credited as co-writer because he was still contracted to Kama Sutra); "Mirage" (co-written with Cordell), "Mony Mony" (co-written with Cordell, Bobby Bloom, and Tommy James) and "Indian Giver" (co-written with Cordell and Bloom), a hit for the 1910 Fruitgum Company. With Cordell he co-produced (and according to some credits co-wrote) Tommy James and the Shondells' hit version of "I Think We're Alone Now", and the album of the same name. He recorded several singles with Cordell in the late 1960s. Gentry also co-wrote (with Kenny Laguna and Paul Naumann) the UK instrumental hit "Groovin' With Mr. Bloe", and (with Tony Lordi) Gene Pitney's "Shady Lady". "Mony Mony" was also a US number one hit in 1987 for Billy Idol.

Bo Gentry died intestate in 1983. His mother, as his next of kin, took legal action in 2002 and later to recover money that she claimed was owing as royalties for "Mony Mony".
