= Surf Goddess =

EP by The Queers
- Released: February 20, 1995
- Recorded: 1994
- Studio: Sonic Iguana Studios, Lafayette, Indiana
- Genre: Punk rock
- Length: 10:58
- Label: Lookout! (LK 108)
- Producer: Larry Livermore

The Queers chronology
Beat Off (1994)	Surf Goddess (1995)	My Old Man's a Fatso (1995)

Surf Goddess is an EP by the American punk rock band the Queers, released in February 1995 by Lookout! Records. It marked the return of longtime drummer Hugh O'Neill to the band, after a forced leave of absence to deal with heroin addiction. Former Screeching Weasel member Dan Vapid, who had been a member of the Queers in 1994, played on the EP as a guest guitarist. Surf Goddess was the result of band leader Joe King and Lookout! head Larry Livermore being dissatisfied with the production techniques on the band's prior album, 1994's Beat Off, which producer Ben Weasel had insisted on keeping basic. King and Livermore wanted to incorporate overdubbing and other effects which Livermore felt were essential to the Queers' sound. In addition to the title track, which was co-written by Weasel, and the Queers original "Quit Talkin'", the EP includes cover versions of Tommy James and the Shondells's "Mirage" and the Undertones' "Get Over You".

After the Queers rescinded their master recordings from Lookout! in 2006, the tracks from Surf Goddess were included on a reissue of their 1995 album Move Back Home, having been remixed and remastered by recording engineer Mass Giorgini.

== Background ==
Longtime Queers drummer Hugh O'Neill had taken a forced leave of absence from the band in 1993, after singer and guitarist Joe King (a.k.a. Joe Queer) had staged an intervention to get him to stop using heroin. Jay Adelberg, drummer of the Hartford, Connecticut-based band Forklift, filled in with the Queers, performing on the live album Shout at the Queers (1994) and their cover version of the Ramones album Rocket to Russia (released in 1994 as part of Selfless Records' Ramones covers album series). Screeching Weasel drummer Dan Panic then joined the Queers, along with his bandmate Dan Vapid joining as a second guitarist, for the band's fourth studio album, Beat Off (1994), and the live album Suck This (1995).

Beat Off had been recorded in Chicago in April 1994, engineered by Mass Giorgini and produced by Screeching Weasel frontman Ben Weasel. Lookout! Records head Larry Livermore was present for the sessions, and was displeased with Weasel's insistence on a no-frills punk rock sound for the album, including eschewing the guitar and vocal overdubs that Livermore felt were "fundamental to [the Queers'] Beach Boys-meet-the-Ramones style." Weasel also removed Vapid's tracks from the album's final mix without the guitarist's knowledge, causing Vapid not to receive any royalty payments. Before leaving Chicago, Livermore and King made plans for another recording session later that summer with Giorgini at his Sonic Iguana Studios in Lafayette, Indiana, to work on songs with fuller arrangements.

Vapid was forced out of Screeching Weasel shortly after the Beat Off sessions, replaced by Green Day bassist Mike Dirnt for Screeching Weasel's subsequent album How to Make Enemies and Irritate People (1994), recorded two months later. Screeching Weasel broke up after recording the album, and Vapid joined Weasel and Panic in their new band, the Riverdales.

== Recording ==
By the time of the Surf Goddess sessions, O'Neill had rejoined the Queers on drums. Vapid played on the sessions as a guest guitarist. The recording was produced by Livermore and engineered by Giorgini. Livermore later wrote that they made sure to "[take] full advantage of the overdubs and effects spurned by Ben Weasel on Beat Off", and that the few days they spent recording the EP were "truly enjoyable" in comparison to other Queers recording sessions.

According to former Queers guitarist JJ Rassler, the EP's title track dated back to the mid-1980s, one of a number of songs he and King had written together in the lead-up to the Queers' first album, Grow Up (1990). As eventually recorded, the song was co-written by King and Weasel, one of several songs (also including "Fuck the World" and "Like a Parasite") that the two collaborated on and recorded versions of with their respective bands. Screeching Weasel recorded their version of "Surf Goddess" first, releasing it on How to Make Enemies and Irritate People. The two bands' versions have different musical structures and verses, with only the pre-chorus and chorus in common. The Queers' cover version of Tommy James and the Shondells' 1967 single "Mirage" was originally recorded and released on Beat Off, and was re-recorded for Surf Goddess. They also covered the Undertones' 1979 single "Get Over You" for the EP; this recording was also included on a 1996 Undertones tribute album titled Here Comes the Summer. The EP was rounded out with an original song, "Quit Talkin'". Lookout!'s Chris Appelgren created the artwork for the release, which featured the "Queers cat", a mascot he had created for the band based on old Felix the Cat images.

== Reception ==
Surf Goddess was released as both a 7-inch record and a compact disc. Reviewing it for AllMusic, critic Kembrew McLeod rated it 4 stars out of 5, calling the title track "indispensable" and their cover of "Get Over You" "a great Ramones ripoff made even better in the hands of these Ramones ripoff artists. Joe King/Queer once said 'I could never understand why people can't love Black Flag and the Beach Boys and Lesley Gore'; on Surf Goddess, the Queers do their best job thus far of synthesizing the sound of these three artists." In his 2015 memoir, Livermore called the EP one of his favorite Queers records. In his 2014 book Punk USA: The Rise and Fall of Lookout Records, author Kevin Prested called it "a solid stopgap on the way to the band's next album."

== Reissue ==
In 2006 the Queers followed several other former Lookout! artists in rescinding their master tapes and licensing rights from the label, invoking a clause in their contract citing delinquent royalty payments. They signed to Asian Man Records, who reissued all of the band's Lookout! albums in 2007, each having been remixed and remastered by Giorgini at Sonic Iguana. The tracks from Surf Goddess were included as bonus tracks on the reissue of the band's 1995 album Move Back Home.

== Track listing ==
7" version
No.	Title	Writer(s)	Length
1.	"Surf Goddess"	Joe Queer, Ben Weasel	3:16
2.	"Quit Talkin'"	Queer	2:06
3.	"Mirage" (originally performed by Tommy James and the Shondells)	Ritchie Cordell	3:03
4.	"Get Over You" (originally performed by the Undertones)	John O'Neill	2:33
Total length:			10:58

CD version
No.	Title	Writer(s)	Length
1.	"Surf Goddess"	Joe Queer, Ben Weasel	3:16
2.	"Mirage" (originally performed by Tommy James and the Shondells)	Ritchie Cordell	3:03
3.	"Get Over You" (originally performed by the Undertones)	John O'Neill	2:33
4.	"Quit Talkin'"	Queer	2:06
Total length:			10:58

== Personnel ==
Credit's adapted from the EP's liner notes.

The Queers

- Joe Queer (Joe King) – lead vocals, guitar
- B-Face (Chris Barnard) – bass guitar, backing vocals
- Hugh O'Neill – drums, backing vocals

Additional musicians

- Dan Vapid (Dan Schafer) – guitar

Production

- Larry Livermore – producer
- Mass Giorgini – audio engineer, mixing engineer

Artwork

- Chris Appelgren – artwork, layout
