= Shady Lady (Gene Pitney song) =

Song by Gene Pitney
- Released: October 1970
- Recorded: 1970
- Genre: Rock
- Label: Stateside Records
- Songwriter(s): Bo Gentry and Tony Lordi
- Producer(s): Bo Gentry

"Shady Lady" is a 1970 Gene Pitney song written by Bo Gentry and Tony Lordi (of the Bel Aires), and produced by Gentry for Stateside Records. The single reached 29 in the UK.

Upon its release as a single, Billboard Magazine called the song a driving rock ballad with a strong performance by Pitney, while projecting the song to have "Hot 100 and sales potency".
