= 1966 in Michigan =

- Decades: 1940s; 1950s; 1960s; 1970s; 1980s
- See also: History of Michigan; Historical outline of Michigan; List of years in Michigan; 1966 in the United States

Events from the year 1966 in Michigan.

The Detroit Free Press (DFP) and the Associated Press (AP) each selected lists of the top stories of 1966 in Michigan. The AP provided separate lists of the top stories selected in statewide polling of editors and broadcasters (APE) and another selected by the AP staff (APS). Those stories included:

1. George W. Romney's landslide re-election as Governor of Michigan on November 8 and his rise in prominence as a possible Republican presidential candidate in 1968 (APE-1, APS-1, DFP-1);
2. The November 8 United States Senate election in which incumbent Republican Robert P. Griffin (appointed by Gov. Romney to complete the term of Patrick V. McNamara who died in April) defeated former Gov. G. Mennen Williams (APE-2, APS-4, DFP-1 [as part of the "Romney sweep"]);
3. The controversy over automobile safety triggered by the publication of Ralph Nader's "Unsafe at Any Speed" and culminating in the Highway Safety Act of 1966 mandating certain safety standards, and revelation that an investigator hired by General Motors was digging into Nader's past (APE-3, APS-2, DFP-5);
4. The fatal shooting on February 12 of Rabbi Morris Adler and his assailant's suicide in front of 900 worshipers at a Sabbath service at Shaarey Zedek synagogue in Southfield (APE-4, APS-9, DFP-3);
5. Racial tensions, including incidents in Lansing starting on August 8, a fire bombing in East Detroit, incidents in Ypsilanti and Muskegon, and culminating with the Benton Harbor riots following a fatal shooting on August 30 (APE-6, APS-3, DFP-7 [east side of Detroit]);
6. The November 29 sinking in Lake Huron of the ore carrier SS Daniel J. Morrell with the death of 28 of 29 crew members (APE [occurred after ballots cast], APS-7, DFP-6);
7. Teacher strikes in the spring and fall (APE-7, APS-5, DFP-8);
8. UFO sightings by hundreds of persons in Washtenaw County in the spring which were later identified as "swamp gas" by an Air Force investigator (APE-5, APS-6, DFP-10);
9. A grand jury probe into "black book" charges at the Detroit Police Department (APE-9, DFP-2);
10. The August 2 primary contest in which former Gov. G. Mennen Williams soundly defeated Detroit Mayor Jerome Cavanagh for the Democratic Party's U.S. Senate nomination (APE-8);
11. The automobile industry's increase in prices on 1967 models to reflect new safety upgrades mandated by the government, and the subsequent roll-back of those increases following public criticism (APE-10, APS-10);
12. A tuberculosis outbreak infecting 14 children and caused by an infected teacher at a nursery school in Garden City (DFP-4);
13. A report by researchers at Wayne State University that they had developed a cancer vaccine (APS-8); and
14. An April boycott by African-American students at Detroit's Northern High School (DFP-10).

The AP and United Press International (UPI) also selected the state's top 1966 sports stories as follows:

1. The 1966 Notre Dame vs. Michigan State football game, ranked No. 1 and No. 2 in the country and ending in a 10–10 tie (AP-1, UPI-1);
2. Michigan State's loss to UCLA in the 1966 Rose Bowl (AP-2);
3. The 1966 Michigan State Spartans football team's undefeated season (UPI-3);
4. The deaths of Detroit Tigers' manager Charlie Dressen on August 10 and of interim manager Bob Swift on October 17; (AP-3, AP-8, UPI-2)
5. The 1965–66 Michigan Wolverines men's basketball team winning its third consecutive Big Ten Conference championship led by Cazzie Russell (AP-5, UPI-4);
6. The Detroit Lions' personnel problems, including Joe Don Looney's refusal to play, dissension among players, and criticism of head coach Harry Gilmer (AP-4, UPI-5);
7. The Detroit Lions' mid-season resurgence led by the passing of rookie quarterback Karl Sweetan, the receiving of Pat Studstill, and the kicking of Garo Yepremian (AP-6, UPI-6 [Sweetan only]);
8. The death of Chuck Thompson in a crash during the APBA Gold Cup race on the Detroit River (AP-7);
9. The appointment of Mayo Smith as manager of the Detroit Tigers (AP-10, UPI-8);
10. Earl Wilson's strong 18–11 season as a pitcher for the Detroit Tigers (UPI-7);
11. Cazzie Russell of Michigan named the UPI Player of the Year (UPI-9); and
12. Denny McLain winning 20 games for the Detroit Tigers (UPI-10).

== Office holders ==
=== State office holders ===
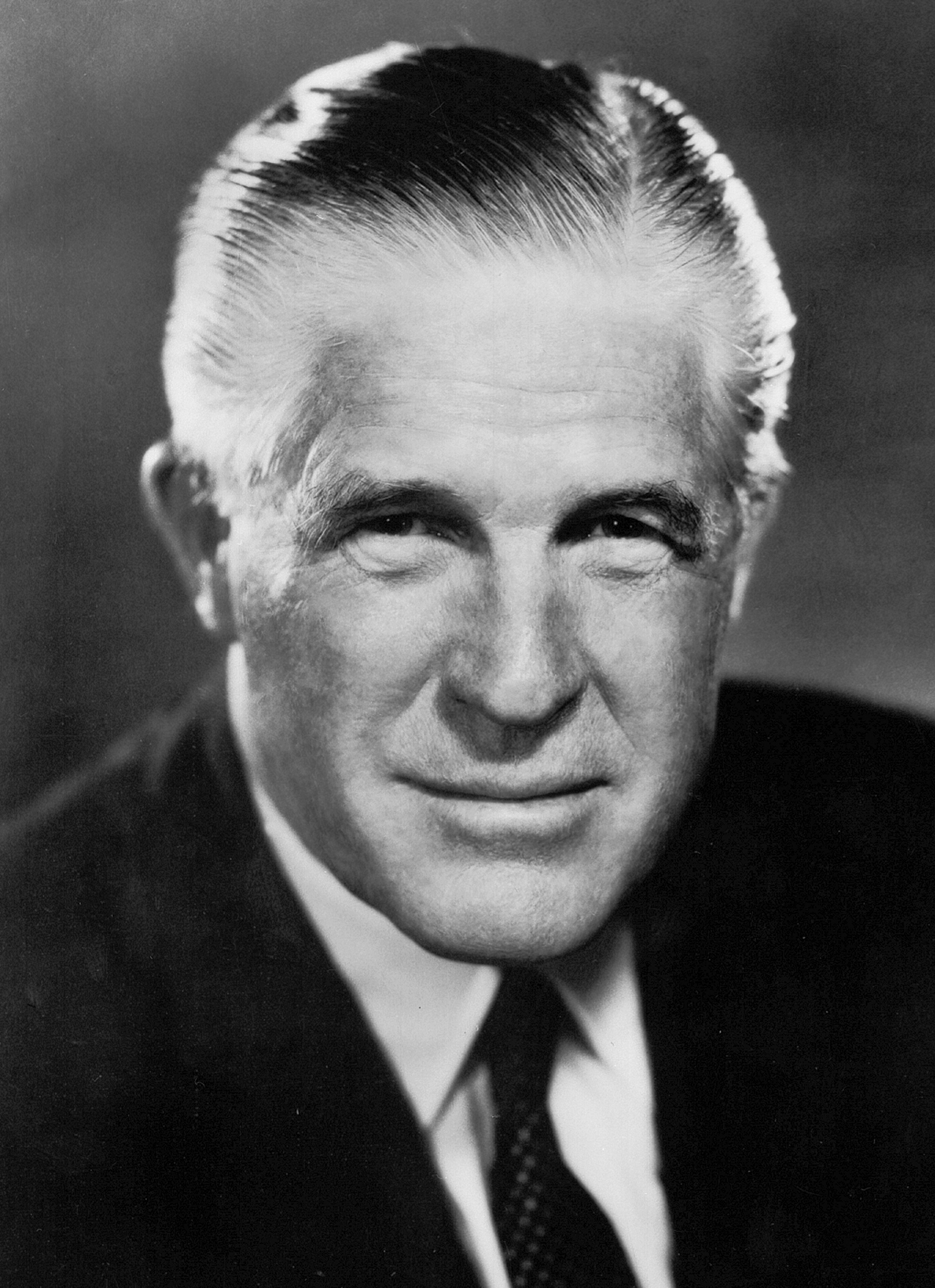
Gov. Romney

- Governor of Michigan: George W. Romney (Republican)
- Lieutenant Governor of Michigan: William Milliken (Republican)
- Michigan Attorney General: Frank J. Kelley (Democrat)
- Michigan Secretary of State: James M. Hare (Democrat)
- Speaker of the Michigan House of Representatives: Joseph J. Kowalski (Democrat)
- Majority Leader of the Michigan Senate: Raymond D. Dzendzel (Democrat)
- Chief Justice, Michigan Supreme Court: Thomas M. Kavanagh

=== Mayors of major cities ===
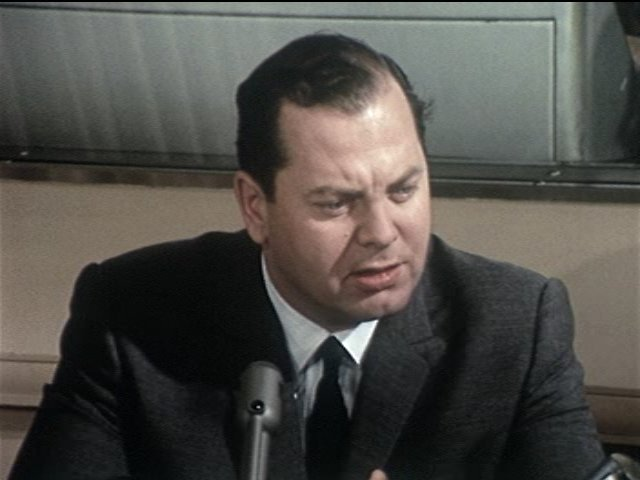
Mayor Cavanagh

- Mayor of Detroit: Jerome Cavanagh
- Mayor of Grand Rapids: C. H. Sonneveldt
- Mayor of Flint: Harry K. Cull
- Mayor of Saginaw: G. Stewart Francke/James W. Stenglein
- Mayor of Warren, Michigan: Ted Bates
- Mayor of Dearborn: Orville L. Hubbard
- Mayor of Lansing: Willard I. Bowerman, Jr./Max E. Murninghan
- Mayor of Ann Arbor: Wendell Hulcher (Republican)

=== Federal office holders ===
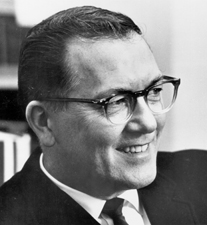
Sen. Griffin

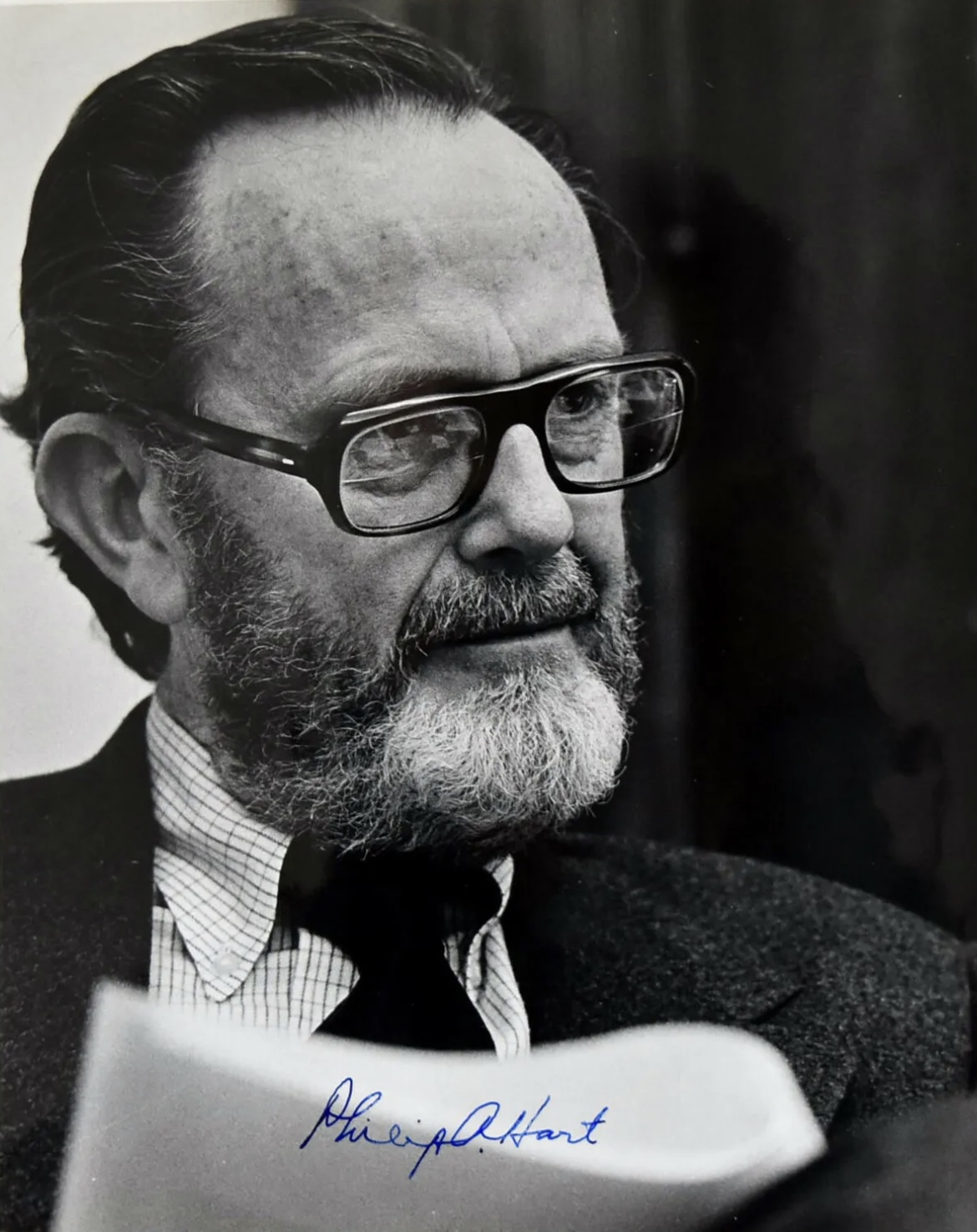
Sen. Hart

- U.S. Senator from Michigan: Patrick V. McNamara (Democrat)/Robert P. Griffin (Republican)
- U.S. Senator from Michigan: Philip Hart (Democrat)
- House District 1: John Conyers (Democrat)
- House District 2: Weston E. Vivian (Democrat)
- House District 3: Paul H. Todd Jr. (Democrat)
- House District 4: J. Edward Hutchinson (Republican)
- House District 5: Gerald Ford (Republican)
- House District 6: Charles E. Chamberlain (Republican)
- House District 7: John C. Mackie (Democrat)
- House District 8: R. James Harvey (Republican)
- House District 9: Robert P. Griffin (Republican)
- House District 10: Elford Albin Cederberg (Republican)
- House District 11: Raymond F. Clevenger (Democrat)
- House District 12: James G. O'Hara (Democrat)
- House District 13: Charles Diggs (Democrat)
- House District 14: Lucien N. Nedzi (Democrat)
- House District 15: William D. Ford (Democrat)
- House District 16: John Dingell Jr. (Democrat)
- House District 17: Martha Griffiths (Democrat)
- House District 18: William Broomfield (Republican)
- House District 19: Billie S. Farnum (Democrat)

== Population ==
In the 1960 United States census, Michigan was recorded as having a population of 7,823,194 persons, ranking as the seventh most populous state in the country. By 1970, the state's population had grown 13.4% to 8,875,083 persons.

=== Cities ===
The following is a list of cities in Michigan with a population of at least 60,000 based on 1960 U.S. Census data. Historic census data from 1950 and 1970 is included to reflect trends in population increases or decreases. Cities that are part of the Detroit metropolitan area are shaded in tan.

1960 Rank	City	County	1950 Pop.	1960 Pop.	1970 Pop.	Change 1960-70
1	Detroit	Wayne	1,849,568	1,670,144	1,514,063	−9.3% ▼
2	Flint	Genesee	163,143	196,940	193,317	−1.8% ▼
3	Grand Rapids	Kent	176,515	177,313	197,649	11.5% ▲
4	Dearborn	Wayne	94,994	112,007	104,199	−7.0% ▼
5	Lansing	Ingham	92,129	107,807	131,403	21.9% ▲
6	Saginaw	Saginaw	92,918	98,265	91,849	−6.5% ▼
7	Warren	Macomb	42,653	89,246	179,260	100.2% ▲
8	Pontiac	Oakland	73,681	82,233	85,279	3.7% ▲
9	Kalamazoo	Kalamazoo	57,704	82,089	85,555	4.1% ▲
10	Royal Oak	Oakland	46,898	80,612	86,238	7.0% ▲
11	St. Clair Shores	Macomb	19,823	76,657	88,093	14.9% ▲
12	Ann Arbor	Washtenaw	48,251	67,340	100,035	48.6% ▲
13	Livonia	Wayne	17,634	66,702	110,109	65.1% ▲
14	Dearborn Heights	Wayne	20,235	61,118	80,069	31.0% ▲
15	Westland	Wayne	30,407	60,743	86,749	42.8% ▲

=== Counties ===
The following is a list of counties in Michigan with populations of at least 100,000 based on 1960 U.S. Census data. Historic census data from 1950 and 1970 are included to reflect trends in population increases or decreases. Counties that are part of the Detroit metropolitan area are shaded in tan.

1960 Rank	County	Largest city	1950 Pop.	1960 Pop.	1970 Pop.	Change 1960-70
1	Wayne	Detroit	2,435,235	2,666,297	2,666,751	0.0% ▲
2	Oakland	Pontiac	396,001	690,259	907,871	31.5% ▲
3	Macomb	Warren	184,961	405,804	625,309	54.1% ▲
4	Genesee	Flint	270,963	374,313	444,341	18.7% ▲
5	Kent	Grand Rapids	288,292	363,187	411,044	13.2% ▲
6	Ingham	Lansing	172,941	211,296	261,039	23.5% ▲
7	Saginaw	Saginaw	153,515	190,752	219,743	15.2% ▲
8	Washtenaw	Ann Arbor	134,606	172,440	234,103	35.8% ▲
9	Kalamazoo	Kalamazoo	126,707	169,712	201,550	18.8% ▲
10	Berrien	Benton Harbor	115,702	149,865	163,875	9.3% ▲
11	Calhoun	Battle Creek	120,813	138,858	141,963	2.2% ▲
12	Jackson	Jackson	108,168	131,994	143,274	8.5% ▲
13	Muskegon	Muskegon	121,545	129,943	157,426	21.2% ▲
14	St. Clair	Port Huron	91,599	107,201	120,175	12.1% ▲
15	Bay	Bay City	88,461	107,042	117,339	9.6% ▲
16	Monroe	Monroe	75,666	101,120	118,479	17.2% ▲

== Sports ==
=== Baseball ===
- 1966 Detroit Tigers season – Under managers Charlie Dressen, Bob Swift and Frank Skaff, the Tigers compiled an 88–74 record and finished in third place in the American League. The team's statistical leaders included Al Kaline with a .288 batting average, Norm Cash with 32 home runs, Willie Horton with 100 RBIs, Denny McLain with 20 wins, and Earl Wilson with a 2.59 earned run average.
- 1966 Michigan Wolverines baseball team - Under head coach Moby Benedict, the Wolverines compiled a 22–11 record and finished third the Big Ten Conference. Bob Gilhooley was the team captain.

=== American football ===
- 1966 Detroit Lions season – The Lions, under head coach Harry Gilmer, compiled a 4–9–1 record and finished in sixth place in the NFL's West Division. The team's statistical leaders included Karl Sweetan with 1,809 passing yards, Tom Nowatzke with 512 rushing yards, Pat Studstill with 1,266 receiving yards, and Garo Yepremian with 50 points scored.
- 1966 Michigan State Spartans football team – Under head coach Duffy Daugherty, the Spartans compiled a 9–0–1 record, played Notre Dame to a tie in what was billed as the Game of the Century, and were ranked No. 2 in the final AP Poll (one spot behind Notre Dame). The team's statistical leaders included Jimmy Raye with 1,110 passing yards, Clinton Jones with 784 rushing yards, and Gene Washington with 677 receiving yards.
- 1966 Michigan Wolverines football team – Under head coach Bump Elliott, the Wolverines compiled a 6–4 record. The team's statistical leaders included Dick Vidmer with 1,609 passing yards, Dave Fisher with 672 rushing yards, and Jack Clancy with 1,077 receiving yards.
- 1966 Western Michigan Broncos football team – Under head coach Bill Doolittle, the Broncos compiled a 7–3 record and were Mid-American Conference co-champions.
- 1966 Central Michigan Chippewas football team – Under head coach Kenneth "Bill" Kelly, the Chippewas compiled a 5–5 record and were Interstate Intercollegiate Athletic Conference champions.
- 1966 Eastern Michigan Hurons football team – Under head coach Jerry Raymond, the Hurons compiled a 5–3–1 record.

=== Basketball ===
- 1965–66 Detroit Pistons season – Under head coach Dave DeBusschere, the Pistons compiled a 22–58 record. The team's statistical leaders included Eddie Miles with 1,566 points, DeBusschere with 916 rebounds, and Ray Scott with 238 assists.
- 1965–66 Michigan Wolverines men's basketball team – Under head coach Dave Strack, the Wolverines compiled an 18–8 record, won the Big Ten Conference championship, and advanced to the 1966 NCAA basketball tournament where they lost to Kentucky in the Mideast Regional Final. Cazzie Russell led the team with 800 points and Oliver Darden led in rebounds with 241.
- 1965–66 Detroit Titans men's basketball team – The Titans compiled a 17–8 record under head coach Bob Calihan.
- 1965–66 Michigan State Spartans men's basketball team – Under head coach John E. Benington, the Spartans compiled a 15–7 record.
- 1965–66 Western Michigan Broncos men's basketball team – Under head coach Don Boven, the Broncos compiled an 8–14 record.

=== Ice hockey ===
- 1965–66 Detroit Red Wings season – Under head coach Sid Abel, the Red Wings compiled a 31–27–12 record, finished fourth in the National Hockey League, but still advanced to the 1966 Stanley Cup Finals where they lost to the Montreal Canadiens. The team's statistical leaders included Norm Ullman and Alex Delvecchio with 31 goals each and Gordie Howe with 46 assists and 75 points. The team's regular goaltender was Roger Crozier, and Hank Bassen was the backup.
- 1965–66 Michigan Tech Huskies men's ice hockey team – Under head coach John MacInnes, Michigan Tech compiled a 23–6–1 record.
- 1965–66 Michigan Wolverines men's ice hockey season – Under head coach Al Renfrew, the Wolverines compiled a 14–14 record.
- 1965–66 Michigan State Spartans men's ice hockey team – Under head coach Amo Bessone, the Spartans compiled a 16–13 record.

=== Golf ===
- Buick Open –
- Michigan Open –

=== Boat racing ===
- Port Huron to Mackinac Boat Race –
- Spirit of Detroit race –
- APBA Gold Cup –

=== Other ===
- 1966 NCAA Indoor Track and Field Championships – The second annual NCAA indoor championships were held at Cobo Arena in Detroit in March; Kansas won the team championship.

== Music ==
Michigan and/or Motown acts performed 11 of the songs ranked on the Billboard Year-End Hot 100 singles of 1966, as follows:

- "96 Tears" by ? and the Mysterians (No. 2);
- "What Becomes of the Brokenhearted" by Jimmy Ruffin (No. 3);
- "Reach Out I'll Be There by the Four Tops (No. 5);
- "You Can't Hurry Love" by The Supremes (No. 13);
- "Hanky Panky by Tommy James and the Shondells of Niles, Michigan (No. 30);
- "Ain't Too Proud to Beg by The Temptations (No. 39);
- "Uptight (Everything's Alright)" by Stevie Wonder (No. 51);
- "Beauty Is Only Skin Deep by The Temptations (No. 58);
- "Don't Mess with Bill" by The Marvelettes (No. 67);
- "My World Is Empty Without You by The Supremes (No. 72);
- "Devil with a Blue Dress On/Good Golly, Miss Molly by Mitch Ryder & The Detroit Wheels

== Births ==
- March 12 - Grant Long, NBA player (1988–2003), in Wayne, Michigan
- March 21 - Al Iafrate, NHL player (1984-1998), in Dearborn, Michigan
- March 25 - Tom Crean, head basketball coach at Marquette (1998-2008) and Indiana (2008-2017), in Mount Pleasant, Michigan
- April 29 - John Vander Wal, Major League Baseball player (1991–2004), in Grand Rapids, Michigan
- June 23 - Chico DeBarge, R&B singer and musician, younger brother of the members of the Motown family act DeBarge, in Detroit
- July 31 - Dean Cain, actor (Lois & Clark: The New Adventures of Superman) and host of Ripley's Believe It or Not!, in Mount Clemens, Michigan
- September 9 - Kevin Hatcher, NHL player (1984-2001), in Detroit
- October 28 - Andy Richter, television sidekick to Conan O'Brien, in Grand Rapids, Michigan
- December 4 - Suzanne Malveaux, television news journalist, in Lansing, Michigan

=== Gallery of 1966 births ===
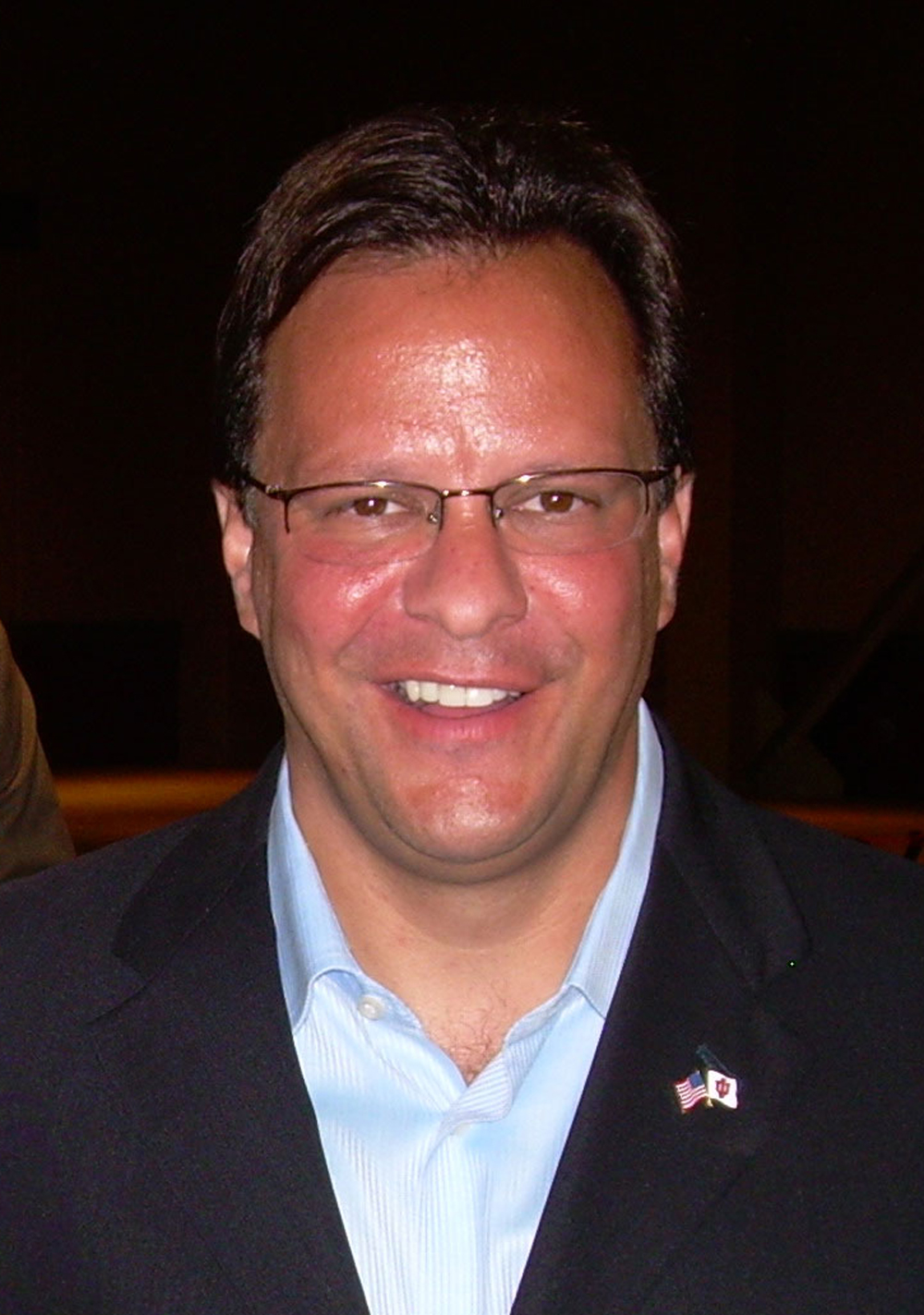
Tom Crean

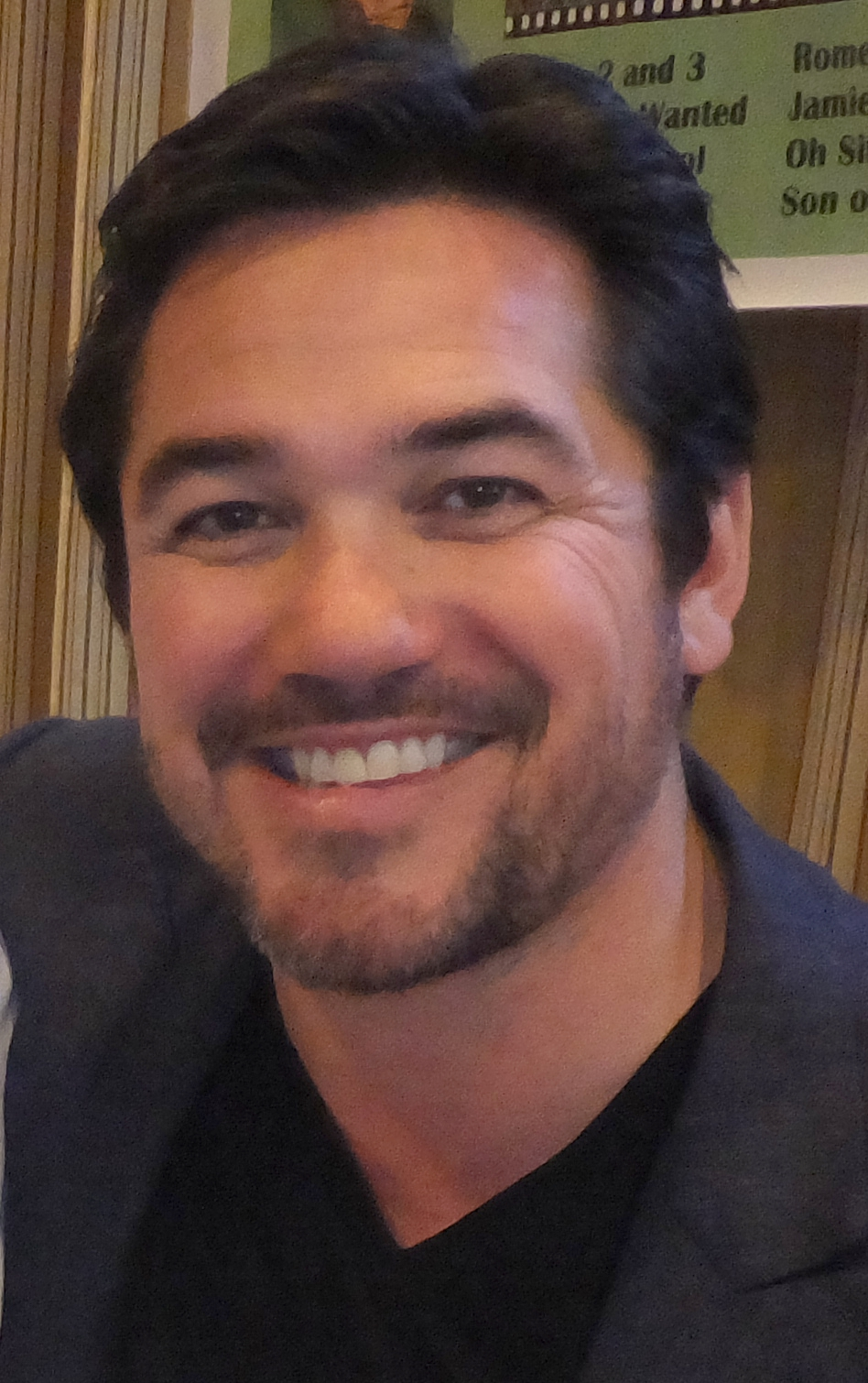
Dean Cain

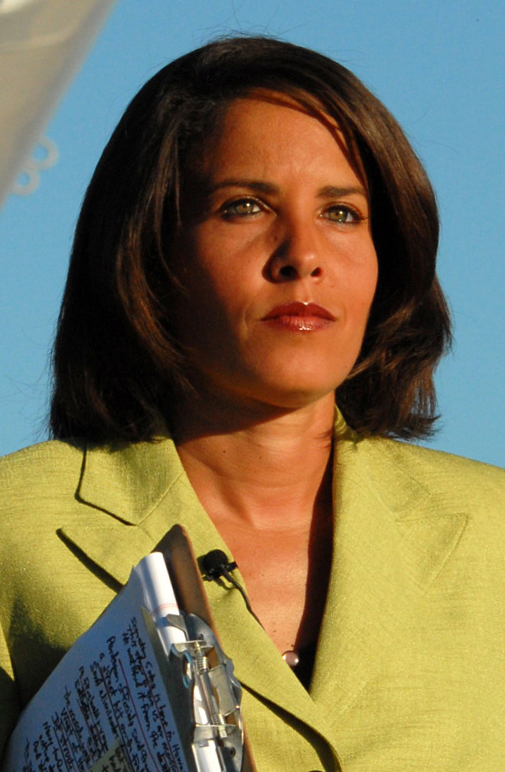
Suzanne Malveaux

== Deaths ==
- February 17 - Alfred P. Sloan, former president and chairman of General Motors and philanthropist, at age 90 in New York City
- April 30 - Patrick V. McNamara, U.S. Senator from Michigan (1955-1966), at age 71 in Bethesda, Maryland
- June 23 - Louis C. Cramton, U.S. Congressman from Michigan (1913-1931), at age 90 in Saginaw, Michigan
- July 5 - Pete Fox, outfielder for Detroit Tigers (1933-1940), at age 57 in Detroit
- August 10 - Chuck Dressen, player, manager, coach in Major League Baseball 1925–1966), manager of Detroit Tigers (1963–1966), at age 71 in Detroit
- October 17 - Bob Swift, player ((1944–1953) and manager (1965, 1966) of the Detroit Tigers, at age 51 in Detroit
- October 18 - S. S. Kresge, founder of the Detroit-based discount retail chain, at age 99 in East Stroudsburg, Pennsylvania

=== Gallery of 1966 deaths ===
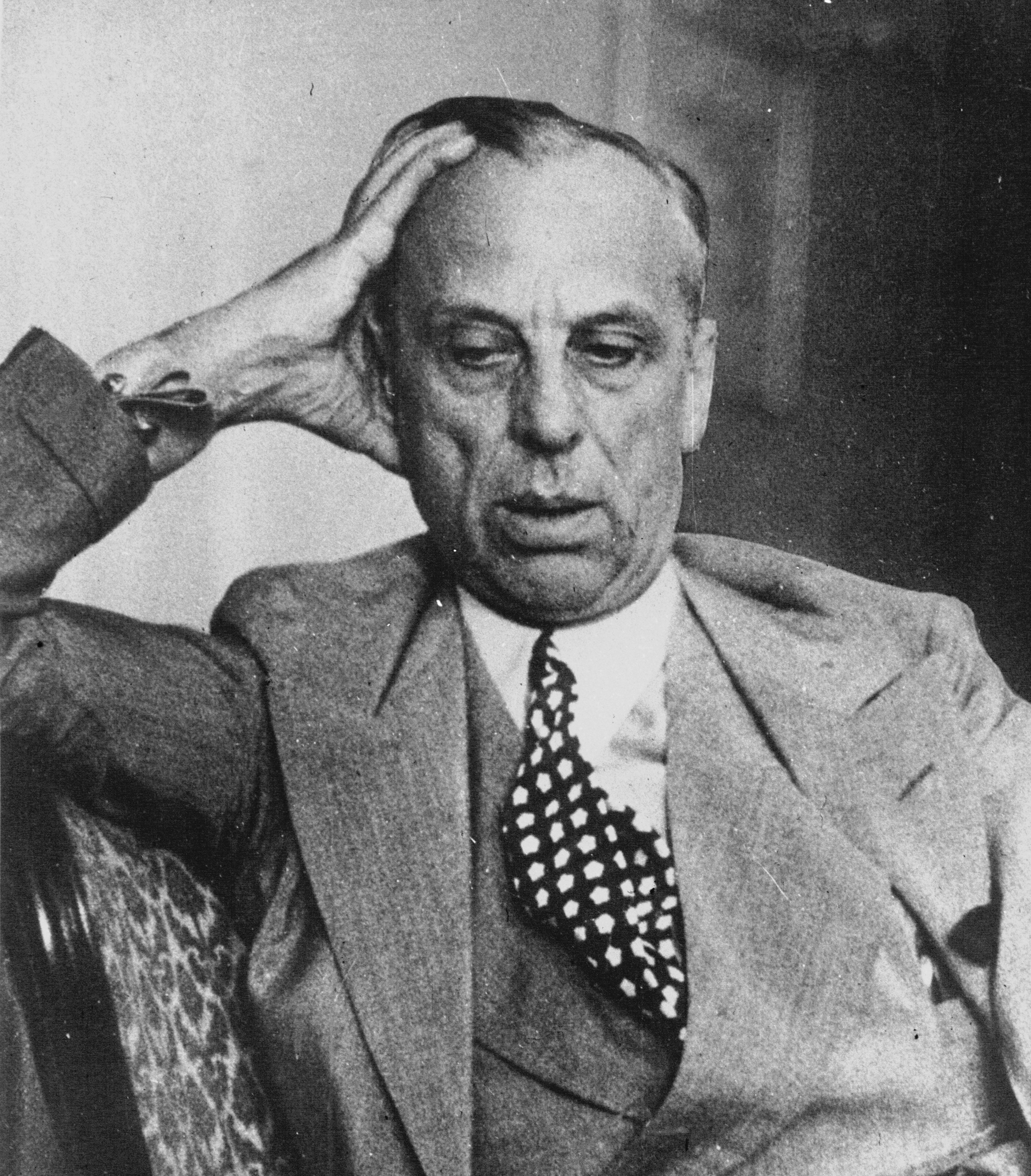
Alfred P. Sloan

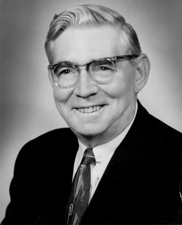
Patrick V. McNamara

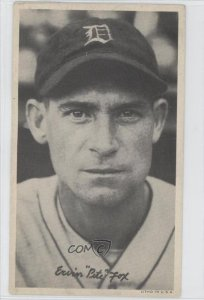
Pete Fox

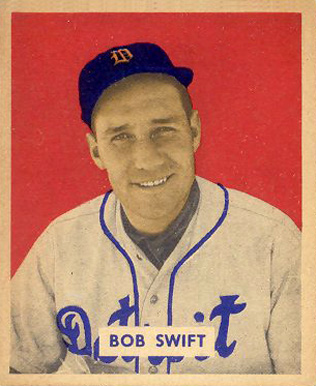
Bob Swift

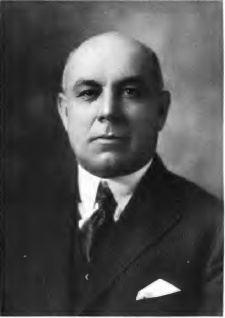
S. S. Kresge

== See also ==
- History of Michigan
- History of Detroit
