= 1964 in Michigan =

- Decades: 1940s; 1950s; 1960s; 1970s; 1980s
- See also: History of Michigan; Historical outline of Michigan; List of years in Michigan; 1964 in the United States

Events from the year 1964 in Michigan.

The Associated Press (AP) and United Press International (UPI) each selected the top 10 news stories in Michigan as follows:

1. The November 3 re-election of Republican George W. Romney as Governor of Michigan, despite a Democratic landslide in the U.S. Presidential and legislative races (AP-1, UPI-1);
2. Reapportionment of state and federal legislative districts, requiring districts to be redrawn "as nearly as practicable" equal in population, resulting in Democrats seizing control of both houses of the Michigan Legislature and the Congressional delegation (AP-2, UPI-2 [reapportionment] and UPI-4 [Democratic control of legislature]);
3. New contracts between the United Auto Workers (UAW) and the automobile manufacturers providing a lower retirement age and providing for higher pensions, reached after costly strikes against General Motors and Ford Motor Company (AP-3, UPI-3);
4. A 134-day newspaper strike called by the International Printing Pressmen and Assistants Union that shut down both the Detroit Free Press and The Detroit News from July 14 until November 25, the longest strike shutdown of metropolitan daily newspapers in American history (AP-5, UPI-5);
5. A May 8 tornado that struck Chesterfield Township in Macomb County, resulting in 13 deaths, injuries to at least 400 persons, and $14 million in damage (AP-4, UPI-7);
6. National Guard scandals arising out of questionable land sales at Camp Grayling and alleged mishandling of armory and liquor funds (AP-7, UPI-6);
7. A strike against Essex Wire Corp. in Hillsdale, Michigan, and the deployment of national guardsman when the company resumed operations with non-union workers (AP-8, UPI-8);
8. A booming economy in Michigan (AP-6);
9. Concern over the Great Lakes reaching their lowest water levels in 100 years (AP-9);
10. Revelation that Daniel West, a successful candidate for the Michigan House of Representatives, had lied about being an honors graduate of Yale Law School and concealed an extensive criminal record (UPI-9);
11. The success of University of Michigan sports teams with Big Ten Conference championships in football, indoor track, wrestling, and gymnastics, a co-championship in basketball, a national championship in men's ice hockey, and second-place finishes in outdoor track, tennis, and baseball (AP-10); and
12. The exposure of Thomas M. Novak as a fraud after four year practicing medicine without a license (UPI-10).

The United Press International (UPI) picked the state's top sports stories as follows:

1. The success of the 1964 Michigan Wolverines football team in compiling an 8–1 record in the regular season, winning the Big Ten Conference championship, and receiving a bid to play in the 1965 Rose Bowl;
2. William Clay Ford Sr.'s firing of the Detroit Lions' five assistant coaches and the resignation two days later of head coach George Wilson;
3. Michigan athletes winning 11 medals at the Olympics;
4. The 1963–64 Michigan Wolverines men's basketball team's Big Ten championship and advancing to the Final Four at the 1964 NCAA University Division basketball tournament;
5. The decision of the University of Detroit to terminate its football program;
6. Dave DeBusschere serving as player and head coach of the Detroit Pistons;
7. The return of Ted Lindsay to the Detroit Red Wings at age 39 and after four years of retirement;
8. The death of Eddie Sachs of Warren, Michigan, in a crash while competing in the Indianapolis 500 on May 30;
9. The 1963–64 Detroit Red Wings, after a mediocre regular season, advancing to the 1964 Stanley Cup Finals and narrowly losing in seven games to the Toronto Maple Leafs; and
10. The Michigan high school basketball championships won by Benton Harbor (Class A), River Rouge (Class B), Grosse Pointe St. Paul (Class C), and Briton-Macon (Class D).

== Office holders ==
=== State office holders ===
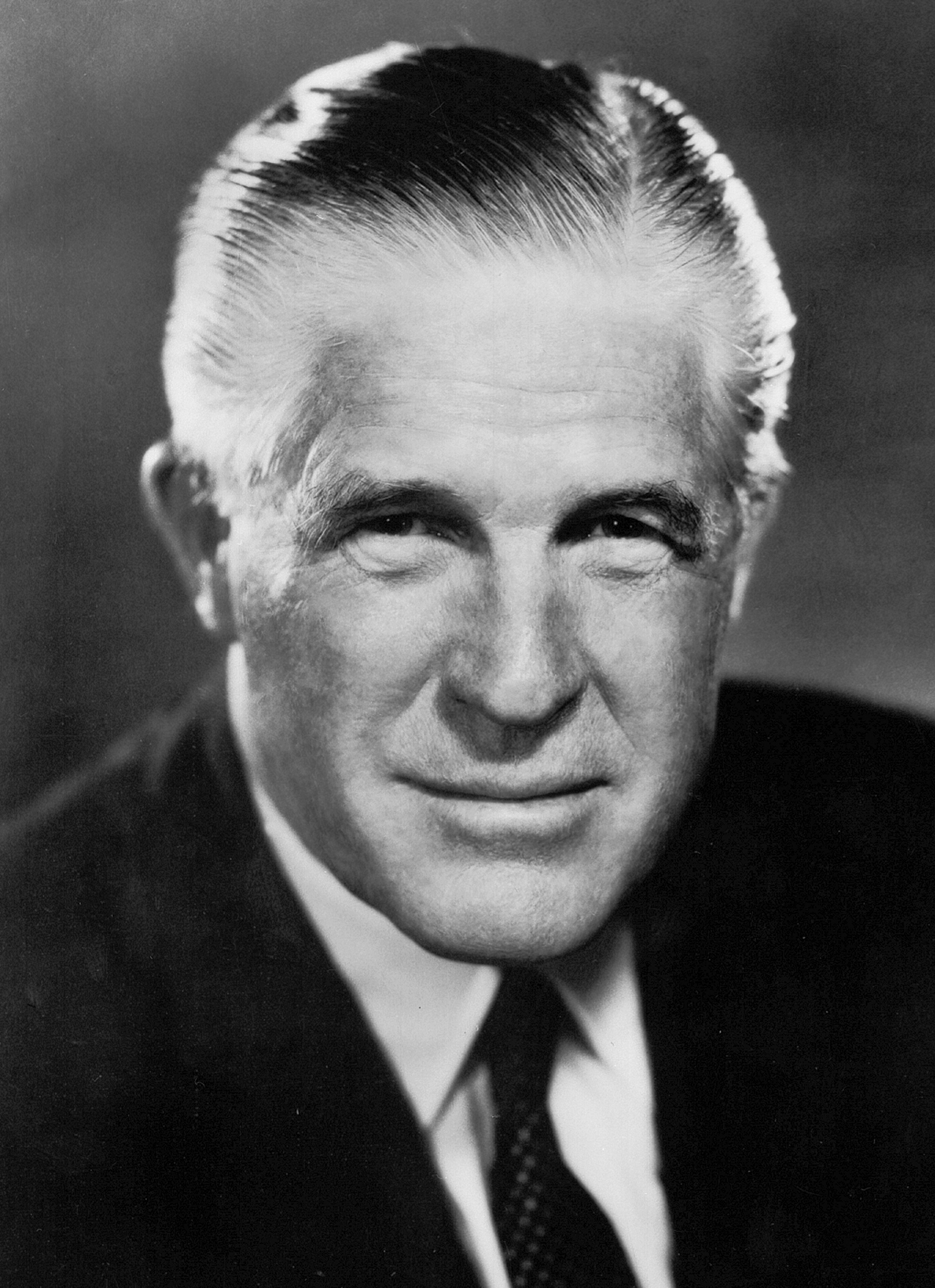
Gov. Romney

- Governor of Michigan: George W. Romney (Republican)
- Lieutenant Governor of Michigan: T. John Lesinski (Democrat)
- Michigan Attorney General: Frank J. Kelley (Democrat)
- Michigan Secretary of State: James M. Hare (Democrat)
- Speaker of the Michigan House of Representatives: Allison Green (Republican)
- Majority Leader of the Michigan Senate: Stanley G. Thayer (Republican)
- Chief Justice, Michigan Supreme Court: Thomas M. Kavanagh

=== Mayors of major cities ===
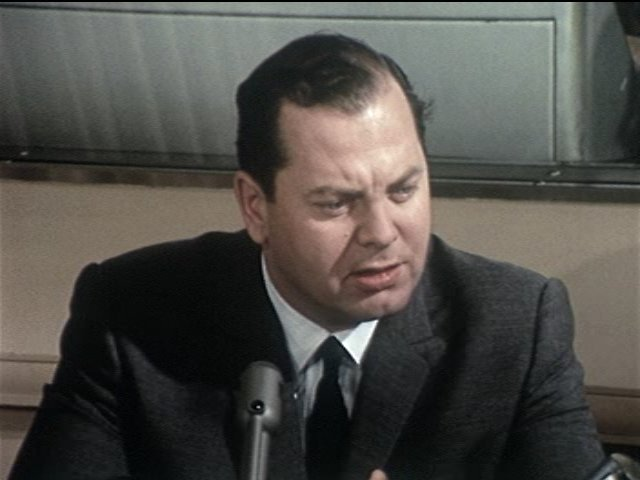
Mayor Cavanagh

- Mayor of Detroit: Jerome Cavanagh
- Mayor of Grand Rapids: Stanley J. Davis/C. H. Sonneveldt
- Mayor of Flint: George R. Poulos/Harry K. Cull
- Mayor of Warren, Michigan: Ted Bates
- Mayor of Saginaw: G. Stewart Francke
- Mayor of Dearborn: Orville L. Hubbard
- Mayor of Lansing: Willard I. Bowerman, Jr. (Republican)
- Mayor of Ann Arbor: Cecil Creal (Republican)

=== Federal office holders ===
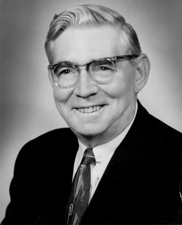
Sen. McNamara

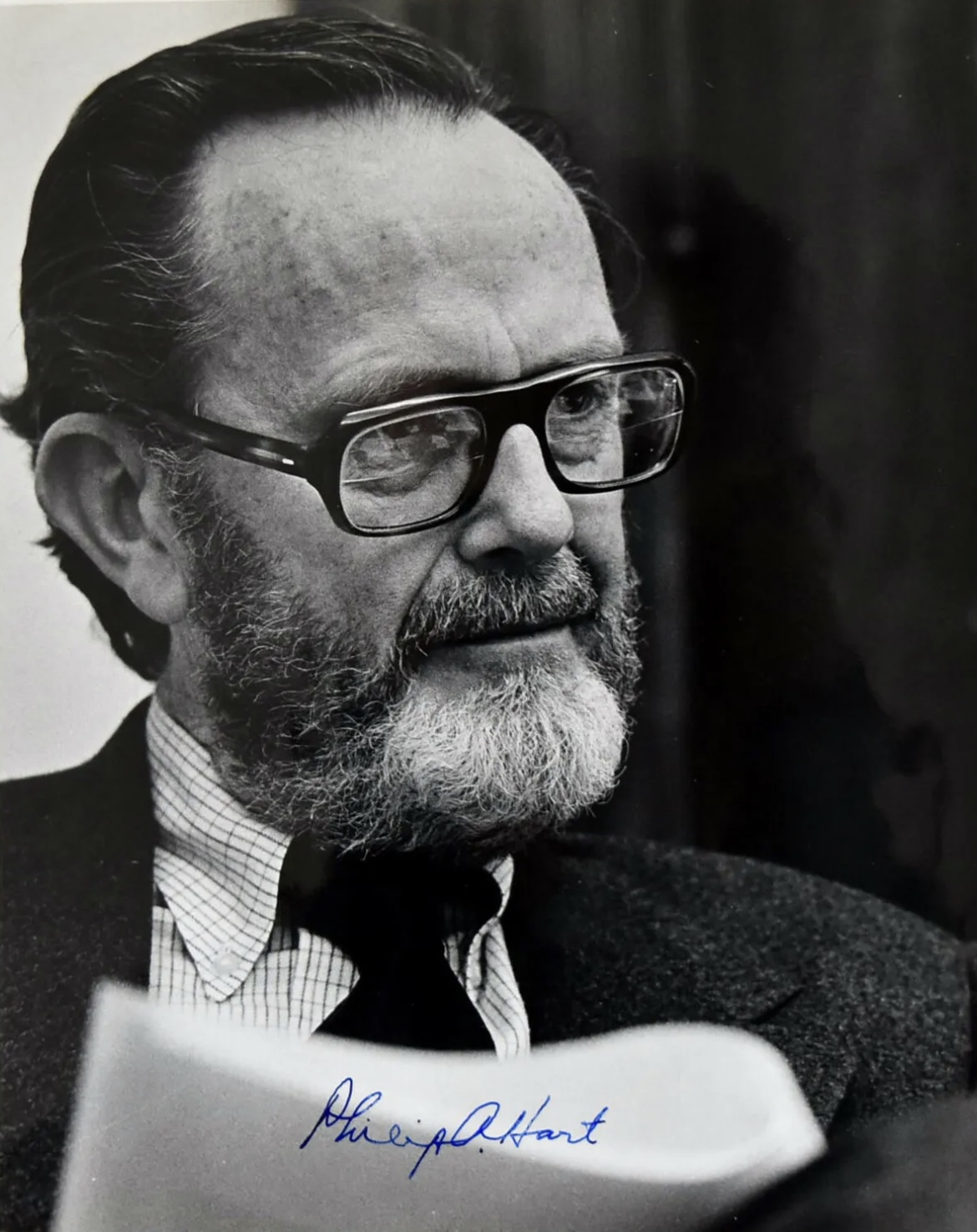
Sen. Hart

- U.S. Senator from Michigan: Patrick V. McNamara (Democrat)
- U.S. Senator from Michigan: Philip Hart (Democrat)
- House District 1: Lucien N. Nedzi (Democrat)
- House District 2: George Meader (Republican)
- House District 3: August E. Johansen (Republican)
- House District 4: J. Edward Hutchinson (Republican)
- House District 5: Gerald Ford (Republican)
- House District 6: Charles E. Chamberlain (Republican)
- House District 7: James G. O'Hara (Democrat)
- House District 8: R. James Harvey (Republican)
- House District 9: Robert P. Griffin (Republican)
- House District 10: Elford Albin Cederberg (Republican)
- House District 11: Victor A. Knox (Republican)
- House District 12: John B. Bennett (Republican)
- House District 13: Charles Diggs (Democrat)
- House District 14: Harold M. Ryan (Democrat)
- House District 15: John Dingell (Democrat)
- House District 16: John Lesinski Jr. (Democrat)
- House District 17: Martha Griffiths (Democrat)
- House District 18: William Broomfield (Republican)
- House At Large: Neil Staebler (Democrat)

== Population ==
In the 1960 United States census, Michigan was recorded as having a population of 7,823,194 persons, ranking as the seventh most populous state in the country. By 1970, the state's population had grown 13.4% to 8,875,083 persons.

=== Cities ===
The following is a list of cities in Michigan with a population of at least 60,000 based on 1960 U.S. Census data. Historic census data from 1950 and 1970 is included to reflect trends in population increases or decreases. Cities that are part of the Detroit metropolitan area are shaded in tan.

1960 Rank	City	County	1950 Pop.	1960 Pop.	1970 Pop.	Change 1960-70
1	Detroit	Wayne	1,849,568	1,670,144	1,514,063	−9.3% ▼
2	Flint	Genesee	163,143	196,940	193,317	−1.8% ▼
3	Grand Rapids	Kent	176,515	177,313	197,649	11.5% ▲
4	Dearborn	Wayne	94,994	112,007	104,199	−7.0% ▼
5	Lansing	Ingham	92,129	107,807	131,403	21.9% ▲
6	Saginaw	Saginaw	92,918	98,265	91,849	−6.5% ▼
7	Warren	Macomb	42,653	89,246	179,260	100.2% ▲
8	Pontiac	Oakland	73,681	82,233	85,279	3.7% ▲
9	Kalamazoo	Kalamazoo	57,704	82,089	85,555	4.1% ▲
10	Royal Oak	Oakland	46,898	80,612	86,238	7.0% ▲
11	St. Clair Shores	Macomb	19,823	76,657	88,093	14.9% ▲
12	Ann Arbor	Washtenaw	48,251	67,340	100,035	48.6% ▲
13	Livonia	Wayne	17,634	66,702	110,109	65.1% ▲
14	Dearborn Heights	Wayne	20,235	61,118	80,069	31.0% ▲
15	Westland	Wayne	30,407	60,743	86,749	42.8% ▲

=== Counties ===
The following is a list of counties in Michigan with populations of at least 100,000 based on 1960 U.S. Census data. Historic census data from 1950 and 1970 are included to reflect trends in population increases or decreases. Counties that are part of the Detroit metropolitan area are shaded in tan.

1960 Rank	County	Largest city	1950 Pop.	1960 Pop.	1970 Pop.	Change 1960-70
1	Wayne	Detroit	2,435,235	2,666,297	2,666,751	0.0% ▲
2	Oakland	Pontiac	396,001	690,259	907,871	31.5% ▲
3	Macomb	Warren	184,961	405,804	625,309	54.1% ▲
4	Genesee	Flint	270,963	374,313	444,341	18.7% ▲
5	Kent	Grand Rapids	288,292	363,187	411,044	13.2% ▲
6	Ingham	Lansing	172,941	211,296	261,039	23.5% ▲
7	Saginaw	Saginaw	153,515	190,752	219,743	15.2% ▲
8	Washtenaw	Ann Arbor	134,606	172,440	234,103	35.8% ▲
9	Kalamazoo	Kalamazoo	126,707	169,712	201,550	18.8% ▲
10	Berrien	Benton Harbor	115,702	149,865	163,875	9.3% ▲
11	Calhoun	Battle Creek	120,813	138,858	141,963	2.2% ▲
12	Jackson	Jackson	108,168	131,994	143,274	8.5% ▲
13	Muskegon	Muskegon	121,545	129,943	157,426	21.2% ▲
14	St. Clair	Port Huron	91,599	107,201	120,175	12.1% ▲
15	Bay	Bay City	88,461	107,042	117,339	9.6% ▲
16	Monroe	Monroe	75,666	101,120	118,479	17.2% ▲

== Sports ==
=== Baseball ===
- 1964 Detroit Tigers season – Under manager Charlie Dressen, the Tigers compiled an 85–77 record and finished in fourth place in the American League. The team's statistical leaders included Bill Freehan with a .300 batting average, Dick McAuliffe with 24 home runs, Norm Cash with 83 RBIs, Dave Wickersham with 19 wins, and Joe Sparma with a 3.00 earned run average.
- 1964 Michigan Wolverines baseball team - Under head coach Moby Benedict, the Wolverines compiled a 19–16 record and finished second in the Big Ten Conference. Dave Campbell was the team captain.

=== American football ===
- 1964 Detroit Lions season – The Lions, under head coach Harry Gilmer, compiled a 7–5–2 record and finished in fourth place in the NFL's West Division. The team's statistical leaders included Milt Plum with 2,241 passing yards, Nick Pietrosante with 536 rushing yards, Terry Barr with 1,030 receiving yards, and Wayne Walker with 74 points scored.

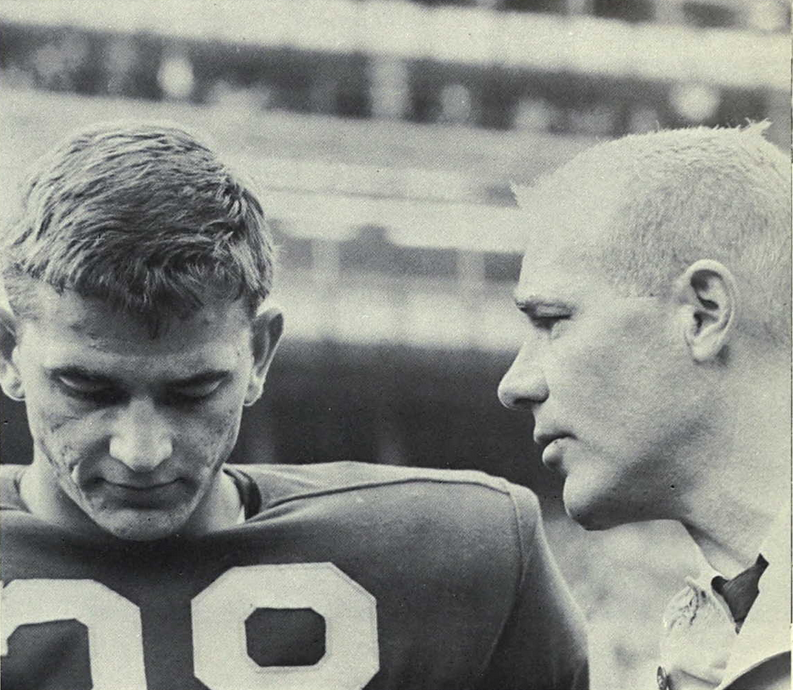
Bob Timberlake and Bump Elliott

- 1964 Michigan Wolverines football team – Under head coach Bump Elliott, the Wolverines compiled a 9–1 record, won the Big Ten Conference championship, defeated Oregon State in the 1965 Rose Bowl, and were ranked No. 4 in the final AP Poll. The team's statistical leaders included Bob Timberlake with 807 passing yards and 54 points scored, Mel Anthony with 579 rushing yards, and John Henderson with 393 receiving yards.
- 1964 Michigan State Spartans football team – Under head coach Duffy Daugherty, the Spartans compiled a 4–5 record. The team's statistical leaders included Steve Juday with 894 passing yards, Dick Gordon with 741 rushing yards, and Gene Washington with 542 receiving yards.
- 1964 Western Michigan Broncos football team – Under head coach Bill Doolittle, the Broncos compiled a 3–6 record.
- 1964 Central Michigan Chippewas football team – Under head coach Kenneth "Bill" Kelly, the Chippewas compiled a 4–5 record.
- 1964 Eastern Michigan Hurons football team – Under head coach Fred Trosko, the Hurons compiled a 4–3 record.
- 1964 Wayne State Tartars football team – Under head coach Stanley J. Marshall, the Tartars compiled a 4–3–1 record.

=== Basketball ===
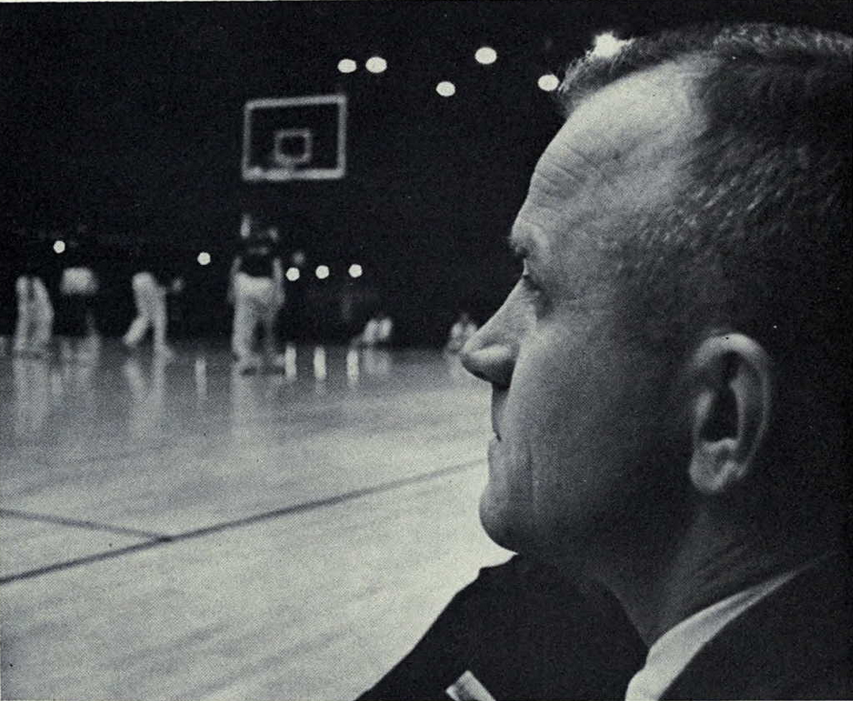
Dave Strack

- 1963–64 Detroit Pistons season – Under head coach Charles Wolf, the Pistons compiled a 23–57 record. The team's statistical leaders included Bailey Howell with 1,666 points and Ray Scott with 1,078 rebounds, and 244 assists.
- 1963–64 Michigan Wolverines men's basketball team – Under head coach Dave Strack, the Wolverines compiled a 23–5 record, won the Big Ten Conference championship, and advanced to the Final Four of the 1964 NCAA University Division basketball tournament where they placed third. Cazzie Russell led the team with 670 points, and Bill Buntin led in rebounds with 338.
- 1963–64 Michigan State Spartans men's basketball team – Under head coach Forddy Anderson, the Spartans compiled a 14–10 record. Pete Gent led the team with 506 points scored, and Stan Washington led in rebounds with 245.
- 1963–64 Detroit Titans men's basketball team – The Titans compiled a 14–11 record under head coach Bob Calihan. Dick Dzik led the team with 543 points scored and 521 rebounds.
- 1963–64 Western Michigan Broncos men's basketball team – Under head coach Don Boven, the Broncos compiled an 8–16 record.

=== Ice hockey ===
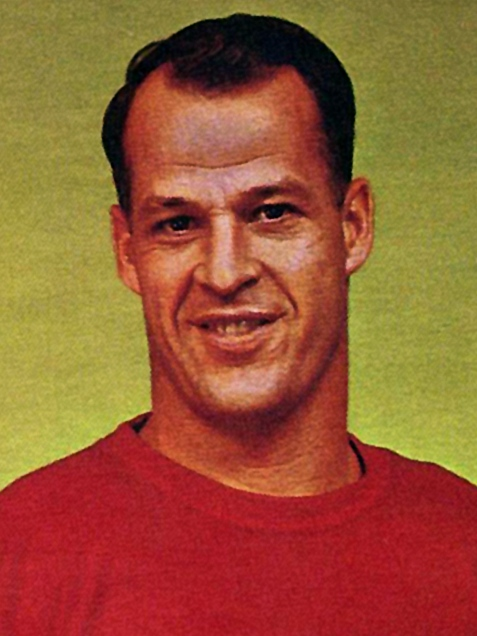
Gordie Howe

- 1963–64 Detroit Red Wings season – Under head coach Sid Abel, the Red Wings compiled a 30–29–11 record, finished fourth in the NHL, and lost to the Toronto Maple Leafs in seven games in the 1964 Stanley Cup Finals. Gordie Howe led the team with 26 goals, 47 assists, and 73 points. The team's regular goaltender was Terry Sawchuk, and Roger Crozier was the backup.
- 1963–64 Michigan Wolverines men's ice hockey season – Under head coach Al Renfrew, the Wolverines compiled a 24–4–1 record and won the national championship at the 1964 NCAA Division I Men's Ice Hockey Tournament, defeating the Denver Pioneers, 6–3, in the championship game in Denver. The team captain was Gordon Wilkie.
- 1963–64 Michigan Tech Huskies men's ice hockey team – Under head coach John MacInnes, Michigan Tech compiled a 14–12–1 record and won the 1965 NCAA Division I Men's Ice Hockey Tournament, defeating Boston College in the championship.
- 1963–64 Michigan State Spartans men's ice hockey team – Under head coach Amo Bessone, the Spartans compiled an 8–17–1 record.

=== Golf ===
- Buick Open – Tony Lema won his first of two second consecutive Buick Opens on June 14 at Warwick Hills Golf and Country Club in Grand Blanc, Michigan.
- Michigan Open – Thom Rosely, age 26, of Belmont won the 44th annual Michigan Open golf tournament at the Lakelands Golf and Country Club in Brighton, Michigan.

=== Boat racing ===
- Port Huron to Mackinac Boat Race –
- APBA Gold Cup - Ron Musson in the Miss Bardahl won the 56th Gold Cup unlimited hydroplane race on July 5 before 250,000 spectators on the Detroit River. The victory was the second of three consecutive Gold Cups won by Musson and the Miss Bardahl.

== Music ==
Detroit's Motown record label had many hits in 1964, including the following:

- "The Way You Do the Things You Do" by The Temptations was released on January 24, reached No. 1 on the R&B chart and No. 6 on the Billboard Hot 100, and was selected at No. 70 on the Billboard Year-End Hot 100 singles of 1964.
- "My Guy" by Mary Wells was released on March 13, reached No. 1 on the Billboard Hot 100, and was ranked No. 7 on the Billboard Year-End Hot 100 singles of 1964.
- "Where Did Our Love Go" by The Supremes was released on June 17, reached No. 1 on the Billboard Hot 100, and was ranked No. 10 on the Billboard Year-End Hot 100 singles of 1964.
- "Baby I Need Your Loving" by the Four Tops was released July 10, reached No. 11 on the Billboard Hot 100, was ranked No. 57 on the Billboard Year-End Hot 100 singles of 1964, and was later selected at No. 390 on Rolling Stone's "500 Greatest Songs of All Time".
- "Dancing in the Street" by Martha and the Vandellas was released on July 31, reached No. 2 on the Billboard Hot 100, and was ranked No. 17 on the Billboard Year-End Hot 100 singles of 1964.
- "Baby Love" by The Supremes was released September 17, reached No. 1 on the Billboard Hot 100, was ranked No. 33 on the Billboard Year-End Hot 100 singles of 1964, was later selected at No. 324 on the Rolling Stone's list of "The 500 Greatest Songs of All Time".
- "Come See About Me" by The Supremes was released on October 27 and reached No. 1 on the Billboard Hot 100.
- "How Sweet It Is (To Be Loved by You)" by Marvin Gaye was released on November 4 and reached No. 6 on the Billboard Hot 100.
- "My Girl" by The Temptations was released on December 21, reached No. 1 on the Billboard Hot 100, and was ranked was ranked No. 88 on Rolling Stone's list of "The 500 Greatest Songs of All Time".

== Chronology of events ==
=== November ===
- November 3

- In the United States presidential election, Lyndon Johnson took Michigan's 21 electoral votes, defeating Barry Goldwater by a margin of 2,136,615 (66.7%) to 1,060,152 (33.1%).
- In the Michigan gubernatorial election, Republican incumbent George W. Romney won re-election, defeating Neil Staebler by a margin of 1,761,899 (55.9%) to 1,384,254 (44.0%). Under Michigan's new Constitution, voters cast their ballots for Governor and Lieutenant Governor as part of a single ticket; William Milliken, president of Milliken's department store in Traverse City and a member of the Michigan Senate, was Romney's running mate and became Lieutenant Governor. Milliken later followed Romney as Governor, holding the office from 1969 to 1983.
- In elections for other state offices, Democratic incumbent James M. Hare defeated Republican Allison Green for Michigan Secretary of State, and Democratic incumbent Frank J. Kelley defeated Republican Meyer Warshawski for Michigan Attorney General.
- In the United States Senate election in Michigan, the incumbent Democrat Philip Hart won re-election, defeating Elly M. Peterson by a margin of 1,987,190 to 1,099,191.
- In the United States House of Representatives elections, districts were realigned to account for population growth in the Detroit suburbs. In the November 3 election, three Republican incumbents were defeated by Democrats: George Meader (49.4%) by Weston E. Vivian (50.4%) in District 2; August E. Johansen (47.3%) by Paul H. Todd Jr. (52.7%) in District 3; and Victor A. Knox (46.7%) by Raymond F. Clevenger (53.3%) in District 11. In all, Democrats gained four seats, with the state's Congressional delegation shifting from an 11–8 Republican majority to a 12–7 Democratic majority.
- John Conyers was elected to his first term in District 1 with 83.6% of the vote. He joined Charles Diggs in Michigan's Congressional delegation. Michigan became the first state since Reconstruction to have more than one African-American representative in Congress. Conyers has remained in office for more than 50 years and became the Dean of the United States House of Representatives in 2015.
- In close voting, residents of Royal Oak voted to approve service of liquor by the glass for the first time in history. The vote count was 17,663 to 15,479.

== Births ==
- May 15 - Rockwell, singer and son of Berry Gordy who had a No. 1 R&B hit in 1984 with "Somebody's Watching Me", in Detroit
- June 30 - Mark Waters, film director (Freaky Friday, Mean Girls, Mr. Popper's Penguins), in Wyandotte, Michigan
- July 22 - David Spade, actor and comedian (Saturday Night Live [1990–1996], Just Shoot Me! [1997–2003], Tommy Boy, Joe Dirt), in Birmingham, Michigan
- August 26 - Bobby Jurasin, CFL defensive lineman (1986–1998) and member of Canadian Football Hall of Fame, in Wakefield, Michigan
- November 7 - Jean Chatzky, financial journalist, author, and financial editor for NBC's Today Show, in Michigan

=== Gallery of 1964 births ===
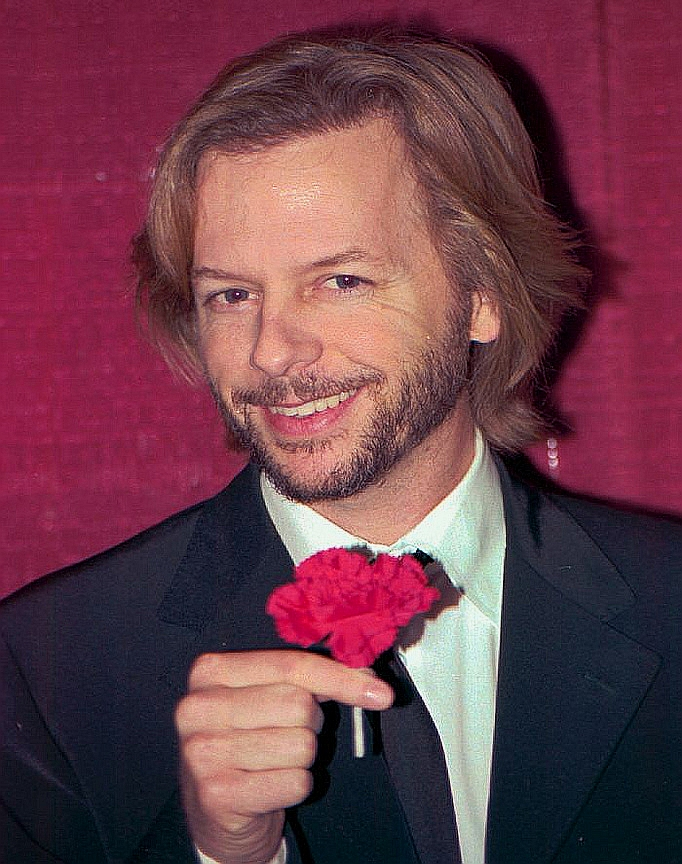
David Spade

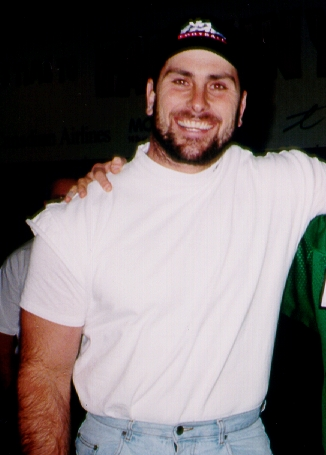
Bobby Jurasin

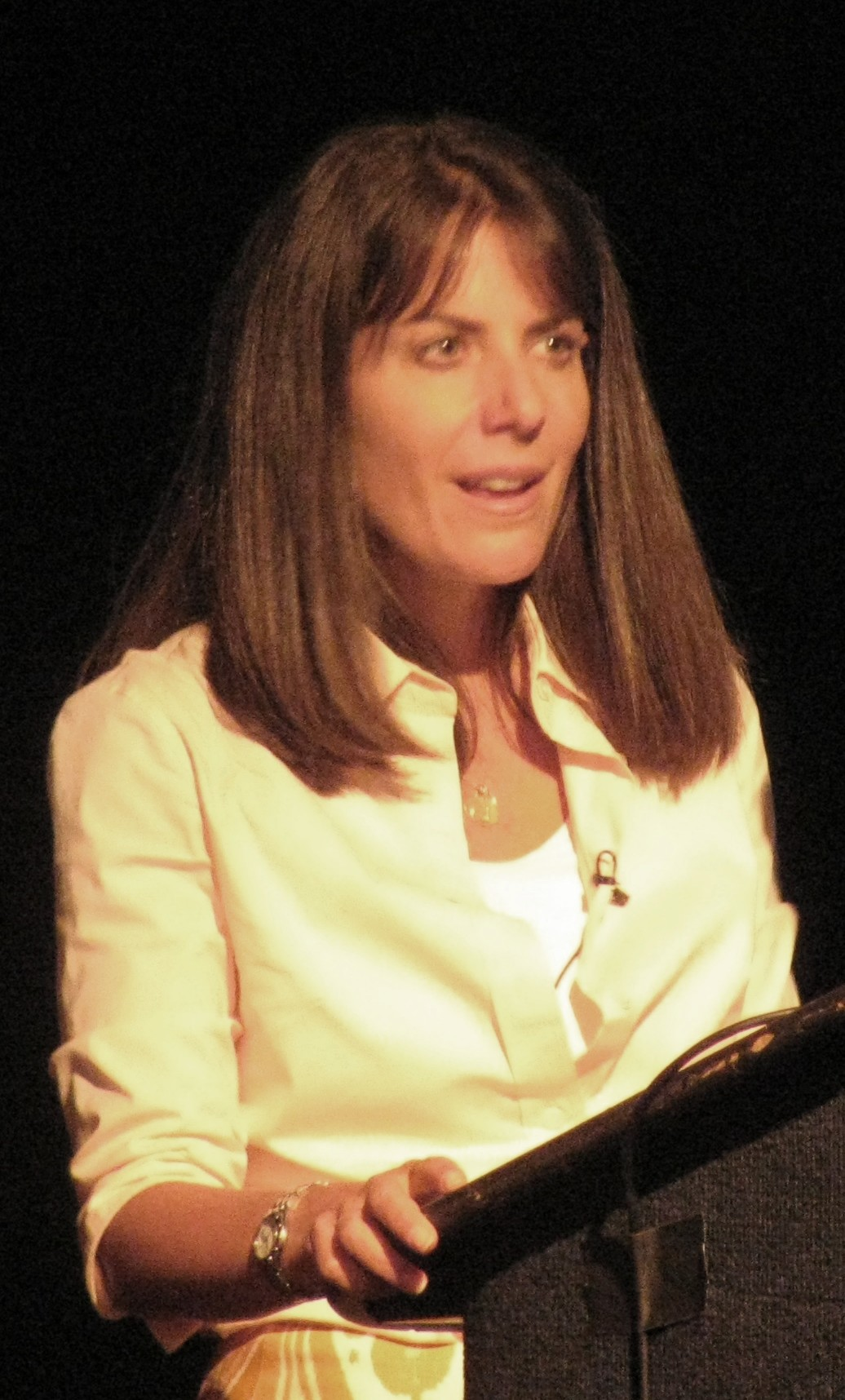
Jean Chatzky

== Deaths ==
- January 27 - Norman Z. McLeod, native of Grayling, Michigan, and film director (Monkey Business, Horse Feathers, Alice in Wonderland, Topper, Pennies from Heaven, The Secret Life of Walter Mitty, and The Paleface), at age 65 in Hollywood
- April 8 - Vernon J. Brown, 45th Lieutenant Governor of Michigan, at age 90 in Webberville
- August 9 - John B. Bennett, U.S. Congressman from Michigan (1947–1964), at age 60 in Chevy Chase, Maryland
- October 10 - Shorty McMillan, Michigan Wolverines quarterback (1910–1911), at age 74 at Cottage Hospital in Grosse Pointe Farms, Michigan

=== Gallery of 1964 deaths ===
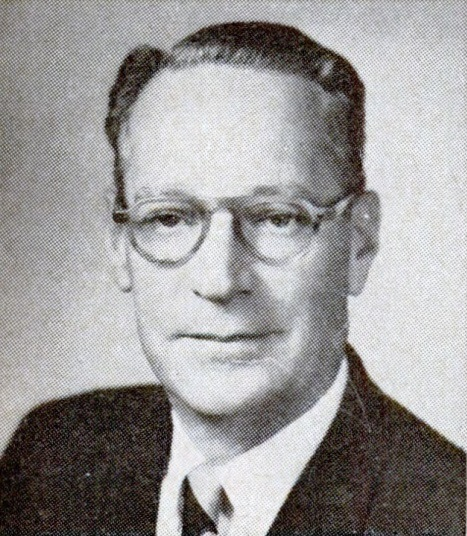
John B. Bennett

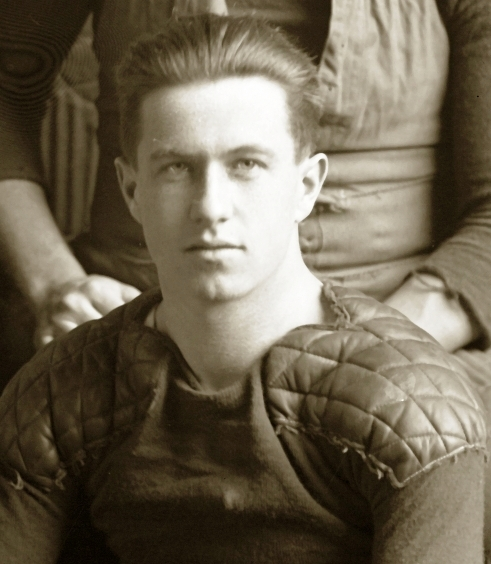
Shorty McMillan

== See also ==
- History of Michigan
- History of Detroit
