= Michigan "swamp gas" UFO reports =

1966 US UFO sightings

A drawing of a "football-shaped" UFO with a "quilted" or "waffled" texture that reportedly landed in a marsh near Dexter, Michigan on May 20, 1966. It was one of two mass sightings dismissed as being caused by swamp gas.

The Michigan "swamp gas" UFO reports were two mass sightings of unidentified flying objects during the nights of March 20 and 21, 1966, in Michigan, United States. The first occurred around marshland near Dexter, while the second mass sighting took place near the campus arboretum of Hillsdale College, about 50 miles away. The sightings took place amid a wave (or "flap") of UFO reports throughout southern Michigan. After the reports were attributed to swamp gas by Air Force civilian investigator J. Allen Hynek, the explanation was widely derided. US congressman Gerald Ford called for a formal Congressional investigation into the sightings.

== March 1966 UFO flap ==
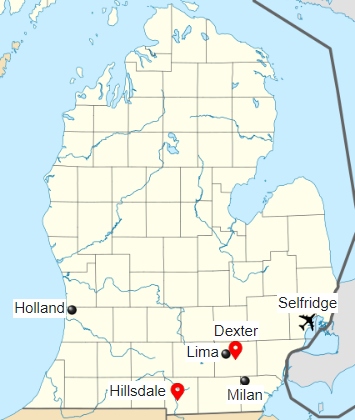
Sightings were reported over Lima, Milan, Dexter, Hillsdale, and Holland. The Dexter and Hillsdale mass sightings (red) were attributed to marsh gas.

=== Initial reports ===
For nearly three hours, beginning around 3:50 a.m. on March 14, Washtenaw County residents, sheriffs and police reported witnessing lights in the sky moving at high speeds over Lima Township. Calls were received from Monroe, Livingston, Ypsilanti, Dexter, and Sylvania. Washtenaw County Sheriff Deputies Buford Bushroe and John Foster reported seeing the lights. Personnel at Selfridge Air Force Base confirmed the sightings but did not pick up the objects on radar.

From 3 to 7 a.m. on March 16, Washtenaw County Sheriff's Deputy David Fitzpatrick and his partner Neul K. Schneider saw two lights in the skies over Milan. Using a miniature camera on a tripod, Fitzpatrick captured two photographs of the lights.

=== Dexter mass sighting ===
On March 20, 1966, Frank Mannor, his wife, and teenage son Ronald were home at their farmhouse northwest of Dexter, watching television. Around 8:30 p.m., alerted by the noise of their six farm dogs, Mannor reported seeing a red "falling star" to the north which then hovered above a nearby marshy area while emitting light. Mannor phoned law enforcement. Deputy Sheriff Stanley McFadden and his partner David Fitzpatrick entered the swamp on foot to investigate. Mannor and his son reported getting within 500 yd (460 m) of the object, describing the object as football shaped with a "waffled" or "quilted" steel texture. They reported the object had blinking lights and antennae. Mannor and son reported the object disappeared and reappeared in a different part of the swamp. With a sound "like a rifle bullet ricocheting off an object", the UFO took off and flew away.

Dexter patrolman Robert Hunawil reported the object flew over his squad car as he was en route to the farm. Dexter Chief of Police Robert Taylor and patrolman N. G. Lee were also witnesses at the farm. Twelve members of law enforcement reported witnessing a UFO. Between the Mannors, neighbors and police, some 60 people were reportedly witnesses.

=== Hillsdale mass sighting ===
Around 9 p.m. on March 21, some 87 residents of the MacIntyre Residence Hall at Hillsdale College saw flashing lights hovering over the Arboretum. They called William Van Horn, Hillsdale County civil defense director, who investigated and observed the lights through binoculars. From the second floor, the group watched the lights for over three hours, taking notes at the time. Hillsdale police officers Harold Hess and Jerry Wise observed the object and reported radio damage after the event. Three squad cars were dispatched to investigate, but the light was not visible from the road.

=== Continued reports ===
On March 22, residents of Dexter and Hillsdale continued to report flying objects, strange sounds, and unexplained lights. On March 23, a teen from Monroe claimed to have taken photos of a UFO.

At 6:15 p.m. on March 24, Robert Nichols and his wife phoned Holland police to report that an object had flown across a highway at a height of 200 ft (61 m). They estimated it was half the size of an automobile. On the night of March 24, personnel in the Washtenaw County Sheriff's department again reported witnessing lights.

On March 29, sightings were reported over Macomb and Oakland counties, as well as Bad Axe, Flint and Ann Arbor. Sightings were reported by Richard Sober, an off-duty sheriff's deputy, and Police Chief Ford Wallace of Linden.

== National attention ==
On March 21, papers nationwide reported on the Dexter sightings. Wire services carried a drawing by a police officer of the reported object. Papers covered a variety of speculations, including one from a self-described "expert" in California who went unnamed. They speculated that "the UFO was filling up on swamp water to recharge its batteries".

On March 24, papers covered a "devil gas" theory, attributing it to Maurice G. Moore, director of the Longway Planetarium. The university dormitory, full of witnesses that took contemporaneous notes of their observations, were profiled. On March 25, it was reported that a US House subcommittee might look into UFOs.

=== Hynek press conference ===
External videos
- Footage of the Hynek press conference

Michigan congressman Weston Vivian requested assistance from the Air Force. On March 22, papers announced that Air Force UFO expert J. Allen Hynek was being dispatched to nearby Selfridge Air Force Base to investigate the Dexter and Hillsdale sightings. Sheriff of Washtenaw County Douglas Harvey recalled driving Hynek to the Mannors' farm, where they witnessed circular marks in the vegetation at the supposed landing site.

On March 25, an Air Force public information officer announced Hynek would appear at a press conference scheduled for that day at the Detroit Press Club. At the conference, attended by sixty members of the press, Hynek credited "marsh gas" as causing the Dexter and Hillsdale sightings.

Hynek dismissed the Fitzpatrick photograph as being of the Moon and Venus. At the press conference, a reporter handed Hynek a magazine showing George Adamski's flying saucer; Hynek opined it looked like a chicken breeder.

Historian Curtis Peebles described the conference as "a critical event in the history of the flying saucer myth". Hynek's explanations were met with skepticism, derision, and "near-universal hostility". Hynek mentioned a prank at the college by young men using flares; civil defense director Will Van Horn denounced the mention of flares.

=== Reactions ===
The Air Force denied reports that it had scrambled jets to chase a UFO. On March 28, Hynek's swamp gas theory prompted then-Michigan Congressman (and future president) Gerald R. Ford to call for a thorough Congressional investigation of "the rash of reported sightings of unidentified flying objects in southern Michigan". Ford issued a second release on April 3.

On March 29, papers speculated on a psychological explanation.

External videos
- UFO: Friend, Foe, or Fantasy? (May 10, 1966) Walter Cronkite reporting on the Michigan sightings
- Hynek on Merv Griffin (July 13, 1966)

The case was covered in the April issue of Life and in May, CBS Reports with Walter Cronkite covered the Michigan sightings.

=== Congressional hearing ===
On April 6, Hynek testified before the House Armed Services Committee alongside Air Force Secretary Harold Brown and Blue Book chief Major Hector Quintanilla. Reading a statement "certainly not dictated by the Air Force", Hynek broke with organization and suggested some aspects of UFOs merited serious study. On July 13, Hynek appeared on The Merv Griffin Show.

In 1966, Congress heard testimony from James Ferguson that the sightings were under investigation by the Aerial Phenomena Branch of the Foreign Technology Division at Wright Field.

== Aftermath and legacy ==
Multiple journalistic organizations listed the UFO sightings as a top-ten story for 1966 in Michigan.

Hynek later argued the topic merited serious study. In a 1968 testimony before a House committee, he recalled "I do not feel that I can be labeled a flying saucer 'believer'-my swamp gas record in the Michigan UFO melee should suffice to quash any such ideas". Hynek recalled in his 1972 book: "Swamp gas became a household word and a standard humorous synonym for UFOs. UFOs, swamp gas, and I were lampooned in the press and were the subjects of many a delightful cartoon (of which I have quite a collection)."

In 1977, Hynek served as a consultant to the Steven Spielberg UFO blockbuster film Close Encounters of the Third Kind. The film features a police chase of UFOs along the Indiana-Ohio border, which is dismissed at an Air Force press conference. Hynek had a cameo in the film.

In 1984, Hynek recalled the incident in an interview with Omni.

The phrase swamp gas became increasingly associated with skepticism of government conclusions. In 1969, the term swamp gas was used derisively to express doubt about Project Blue Book.

John A. Keel described the sightings as beginning "The Great Wave of March 1966". Frank Mannor's death in 1983 saw the publication of retrospectives about the sightings. In 1990, an educational computer game was released about an alien named "Swamp Gas" titled Swamp Gas Visits the United States of America.

In 2006, Douglas Harvey, the former sheriff, recalled: "Dr. Hynek was sent in from the U.S. government. He came into my office. We went out to the site where supposedly this object came down on the ground. Dr. Hynek in the car said, 'There is something. We just can't put our finger on it. We've been investigating this for quite a while.'" Once back at the office, Hynek requested privacy for a phone call; "He was on the phone for quite a while, which I found very enlightening. He came out and I said, 'Well, Dr. Hynek. What do you think?' He said, 'It's swamp gas.' He tells me one minute he has no idea what it is. And then he makes one phone call to Washington and comes out and gives a statement that it's swamp gas. Very strange."

In 1994, an episode of The X-Files titled "E.B.E." featured a plot where debunker Dana Scully suggests a UFO sighting may have been caused by swamp gas. The 1997 film Men in Black featured an agent dismissing a UFO sighting by explaining that "swamp gas from a weather balloon was trapped in a thermal pocket and refracted the light from Venus", combining the initial mainstream explanations given for the Dexter sightings, the Roswell Incident, the 1952 Washington D.C. UFO incident, and the Mantell UFO incident. In 1998, the sighting was one covered by Popular Mechanics. In 2001, author Patrick Huyghe titled his memoir Swamp Gas Times. The 1966 incident was featured in the 2006 book Weird Michigan. In 2015, the Hillsdale campus newspaper interviewed one of the police officers who had witnessed the UFO. In 2016, the 50th anniversary of the sightings was commemorated by regional media. In 2019, a TV series loosely inspired by Hynek's life dramatized a public rejection of his swamp gas hypothesis.

Lara Zielin, editorial director of University of Michigan's Bentley Historical Library later described: "The sightings were so widespread and the witnesses were so credible that law enforcement and senators and governors and faculty researchers would all become involved trying to figure out what in the world was going on."

== See also ==
- Will-o'-the-Wisp – Atmospheric ghost lights (often hypothesized to be a type of marsh light resulting from marsh gas)
