= I Think We're Alone Now (album) =

Studio album by Tommy James and the Shondells
- Released: February 1967
- Genres: Pop rock, garage rock
- Length: 29:19
- Label: Roulette
- Producers: Bo Gentry, Ritchie Cordell

Tommy James and the Shondells chronology
It's Only Love (1966)	I Think We're Alone Now (1967)	Gettin' Together (1967)

Singles from I Think We're Alone Now
- 1. "I Think We're Alone Now" Released: January 1967; 2. "Mirage" Released: January 5, 1967; 3. "I Like the Way" Released: 1967

Professional ratings
Review scores
Source	Rating
Allmusic	3.5/5 stars

I Think We're Alone Now is the third studio album by the American pop rock band Tommy James and the Shondells, released in 1967.

The album had three singles that charted. The title track went to #4 on the Billboard Hot 100. "Mirage" reached #10 on the chart. "I Like the Way" reached #25 on the chart. The album landed on the Billboard 200, reaching #74.

Original copies feature a black album cover with two pairs of yellow bare footsteps walking side by side, then facing each other near the top of the cover. This was deemed too controversial for the time and was changed to a yellow cover with a photo of the group.

== Track listing ==
All songs written and composed by Ritchie Cordell except where noted.

No.	Title	Writer	Length
1.	"I Think We're Alone Now"		2:08
2.	"Trust Each Other in Love"		2:08
3.	"What I'd Give to See Your Face Again"		3:15
4.	"Baby Let Me Down"		1:43
5.	"Let's Be Lovers"	Ritchie Cordell, Jimmy Wisner, R. Schwartz	2:18
6.	"Run, Run, Baby, Run"		2:18
7.	"Mirage"		2:30
8.	"I Like the Way"		2:42
9.	"California Sun"	Henry Glover	2:59
10.	"(Baby, Baby) I Can't Take it No More"		2:17
11.	"Gone, Gone, Gone"	Ritchie Cordell, Sal Trimachi	2:13
12.	"Shout"	Rudolph Isley, Ronald Isley, O'Kelly Isley, Jr.	1:50

== Personnel ==
- Bass, piano: Mike Vale
- Drums: Peter Lucia
- Guitars: Ed Gray, Tommy James
- Bass, piano, tenor sax, vibraphone: George Magura
- Piano, organ, cordovox, accordion: Ronnie Rosman
- Producer: Bo Gentry, Ritchie Cordell
- Arranger: Jimmy Wisner
- Engineer: Bruce Staple
- Recorded at: Allegro Studios

== Charts ==
Album

Year	Chart	Peak Position
1967	Billboard 200	74

Singles

Year	Single	Chart	Peak position
1967	"I Think We're Alone Now"	Billboard Hot 100	4
1967	"Mirage"	Billboard Hot 100	10
1967	"I Like the Way"	Billboard Hot 100	25
