= Mirage (Tommy James and the Shondells song) =

Single by Tommy James and the Shondells

from the album I Think We're Alone Now
- Released: January 5, 1967
- Genre: Rock; bubblegum pop
- Length: 2:30
- Label: Roulette
- Songwriter: Ritchie Cordell
- Producer: Bo Gentry

Tommy James and the Shondells singles chronology
"I Think We're Alone Now" (1967)	"Mirage" (1967)	"I Like the Way" (1967)

"Mirage" is a song by the American rock and roll group Tommy James and the Shondells, released as a single on January 5, 1967 on the Roulette Records label.

== Background ==
"Mirage" was recorded for the I Think We're Alone Now album.

During a songwriting session producer Bo Gentry accidentally inserted a master copy of the "I Think We're Alone Now" song backwards in his reel-to-reel tape player. Tommy and the group instantly liked the reverse chord progression and recorded it as "Mirage" with new lyrics by Ritchie Cordell, who had also written "I Think We're Alone Now".

== Charts ==
"Mirage" debuted on the Hot 100 on James' 20th birthday, eventually reaching number 10 on June 17, 1967, number 2 on the Canadian charts on June 24, 1967, and number one on Chicago AM radio stations WCFL on May 18, 1967 and WLS on May 19, 1967.
