= Weasel Mania =

Compilation album by Screeching Weasel
- Released: 2005
- Recorded: 1988–2000
- Genre: Punk rock, pop punk
- Label: Fat Wreck Chords

Screeching Weasel chronology
Teen Punks in Heat (2000)	Weasel Mania (2005)	First World Manifesto (2011)

Professional ratings
Review scores
Source	Rating
IGN	8.8/10

Weasel Mania is a compilation album by the Chicago punk rock band Screeching Weasel. It was released on Fat Wreck Chords in 2005. The album title is an homage to the Ramones album Ramones Mania.

== Track listing ==
All songs written by Ben Weasel except "I Wanna Be a Homosexual" by Ben Weasel/John Jughead/Dan Vapid, "Hey Suburbia" written by Ben Weasel/Jughead, and "She's Giving Me the Creeps" written by Ben Weasel/Danny Vapid.

1. "My Right"
2. "Ashtray"
3. "Supermarket Fantasy"
4. "Hey Suburbia"
5. "Cindy's on Methadone"
6. "My Brain Hurts"
7. "What We Hate"
8. "The Science of Myth"
9. "She's Giving Me the Creeps"
10. "I Wanna Be a Homosexual"
11. "Jeannie's Got a Problem with Her Uterus"
12. "Joanie Loves Johnny"
13. "Peter Brady"
14. "Totally"
15. "Leather Jacket"
16. "Every Night"
17. "Planet of the Apes"
18. "99"
19. "I Wrote Holden Caulfield"
20. "Phasers on Kill"
21. "You Blister My Paint"
22. "Cool Kids"
23. "The First Day of Summer"
24. "Racist Society"
25. "Dummy Up"
26. "Pervert at Large"
27. "Speed of Mutation"
28. "My Own World"
29. "Video"
30. "Sidewalk Warrior"
31. "Static"
32. "Bottom of the 9th"
33. "Gotta Girlfriend"
34. "You're the Enemy"
- Tracks 1–4 from Boogadaboogadaboogada!
- Tracks 5–8 from My Brain Hurts
- Tracks 9–10 from Kill the Musicians
- Tracks 11–12 from Wiggle
- Tracks 13–16 from Anthem for a New Tomorrow
- Tracks 17–19 from How to Make Enemies and Irritate People
- Tracks 20–23 from Bark Like a Dog
- Track 24 from Major Label Debut
- Tracks 25–27 from Television City Dream
- Track 28 from Return of the Read Menace
- Track 29 from Four on the Floor
- Tracks 30–31 from Emo
- Tracks 32–34 from Teen Punks in Heat

== Personnel ==
- Ben Weasel - lead vocals, guitar on tracks 1–4, 13–23, and 29–31
- Jughead - guitar
- Warren Ozzfish - bass on tracks 1–4
- Steve Cheese - drums on tracks 1–4
- Dan Vapid - guitar on tracks 5–12, bass on tracks 13–16 and 20–23
- Dave Naked - bass on tracks 5–10
- Dan Panic - drums on tracks 5–23
- Johnny Personality - bass on tracks 11–12
- Fat Mike - backing vocals on track 13
- Mike Dirnt - bass on tracks 17–19
- Teakettle Jones - keyboards on track 22
- Zac Damon - guitar on tracks 24–27
- Mass Giorgini - bass on tracks 24–34
- Dan Lumley - drums on tracks 24–34
- Phillip Hill - guitar on tracks 32–34
