= Thank You Very Little =

Compilation album by Screeching Weasel
- Released: February 1, 2000
- Recorded: 1986–1999
- Genre: Punk rock, pop punk, hardcore punk, skate punk
- Length: 117:53
- Label: Panic Button Records/Lookout!

Screeching Weasel chronology
Emo (1999)	Thank You Very Little (2000)	Teen Punks in Heat (2000)

Professional ratings
Review scores
Source	Rating
Allmusic	link

Thank You Very Little is a compilation by Screeching Weasel. It contains b-sides, rarities, and a live show. The title was taken from a line in the movie Caddyshack. Most of the second disc is taken from a show in Philadelphia from the band's 1993 tour.

== Track listing ==
- All songs written by Ben Weasel except where noted.

=== Disc 1 ===
1. "I Hate Old Folks"
2. "Nothing Matters"
3. "Crawl"
4. "Someday"
5. "I Need Therapy"
6. "Slogans"
7. "I Wanna Be a Homosexual" (Ben Weasel/Dan Vapid/John Jughead)
8. "Crying in My Beer"
9. "Jeannie's Got a Problem With Her Uterus"
10. "Shirley's on Methadone"
11. "Amy Saw Me Looking at Her Boobs" (Ben Weasel/Joe King)
12. "27 Things I Wanna Do to You"
13. "Every Night"
14. "Totally"
15. "Nightbreed"
16. "Suzanne Is Getting Married"
17. "Waiting for Susie" (Ben Weasel/Dan Vapid)
18. "Lose the Dink"
19. "Stuck Out Here"
20. "Suspect Device" (Jake Burns/Gordon Ogilvie)
21. "Fuck You" (Gerry Hannah)
22. "The Prisoner" (Joe Keithley/C. Keighly)
23. "Can't Take It"
24. "My Own World"
25. "Tightrope"
26. "Dirt" (James Osterberg/Ron Asheton/Dave Alexander/Scott Asheton)
27. "You Are My Sunshine" (Jimmie Davis/Charles Mitchell)
28. "Anchor" (Masafumi Isobe/Kudo Tetsuya/Hiramoto Leona/Ben Weasel)

=== Disc 2 ===
1. "I Love Beer"
2. "Around on You" (Ben Weasel/Dan Vapid)
3. "Squeaky Clean" (Ben Weasel/Dan Vapid)
4. "Electroshock Therapy"
5. "You're the Enemy"
6. "Intro"
7. "Slogans"
8. "Cindy's on Methadone"
9. "Teenage Freakshow" (Ben Weasel/Dan Vapid)
10. "Veronica Hates Me"
11. "I Was a High School Psychopath" (Dan Vapid)
12. "I Can See Clearly" (Johnny Nash)
13. "Joanie Loves Johnny" (Ben Weasel)
14. "Automatic Rejector" (John Jughead/Dan Panic/Johnny Personality/Dan Vapid/Ben Weasel)
15. "Supermarket Fantasy"
16. "Science of Myth"
17. "I'm Gonna Strangle You"
18. "Hey Suburbia" (Ben Weasel/John Jughead)
19. "Totally"
20. "Inside Out"
21. "Goodbye to You" (Ben Weasel/Dan Vapid)
22. "Guest List" (Ben Weasel/Dan Vapid)
23. "Eine Kleine Scheissemusic" (Ben Weasel/Dan Vapid)

== Credits ==
=== Disc 1 ===
- Ben Weasel- Vocals, guitar on tracks 1–5, 15–21, 25, and 27–28
- John Jughead- Guitar
- Vinnie Bovine- Bass on tracks 1–2
- Steve Cheese- Drums on tracks 1–2
- Dan Vapid- Guitar on tracks 6–12, bass on tracks 13–14 and 18–19
- Warren Fish- Bass on tracks 6–7
- Johnny Personality- Bass on tracks 8–12, backing vocals on track 23
- Dan Panic- Drums on tracks 8–19
- Mike Dirnt- Bass on tracks 16–17
- Mass Giorgini- Bass on tracks 17 and 20–28
- Dan Lumley- Drums on tracks 20–28
- Zac Damon- Guitar on tracks 22–24
- Jesse Michaels- Guitar solo and backing vocals on track 27
- Tracks 1–2 from 1986 Demo tape
- Tracks 3–5 from 1989 Demo tape
- Track 6 from There's A Fungus Amongus compilation
- Track 7 from What Are You Pointing At? compilation
- Tracks 8–9 from 1992 Demo tape
- Tracks 10–12 outtakes from Wiggle
- Tracks 13–14 outtakes from Anthem for a New Tomorrow
- Track 15 outtake from How to Make Enemies and Irritate People
- Tracks 16–17 from Suzanne Is Getting Married
- Tracks 18–19 outtakes from Bark Like A Dog
- Tracks 20–21, 26 from Jesus Hates You
- Tracks 20–24 outtakes from Television City Dream
- Tracks 25–28 outtakes from Emo

=== Disc 2 ===
- Ben Weasel- Vocals, guitar on tracks 2–22, piano on track 23
- John Jughead- Guitar on tracks 1–23
- Doug Ward- Guitar on track 1
- Dan Vapid- Bass on tracks 1–22, piano on track 23
- Brian Vermin- Drums on track 1
- Dan Panic- Drums on tracks 2–22
- Track 1 and 23 from 1989 live performance
- Tracks 2–5 from 1993 band rehearsal
- Tracks 6–22 from March 20, 1993, live performance
