= Beat Is on the Brat =

Beat Is On The Brat

Compilation album by Screeching Weasel
- Released: November 10, 1998
- Recorded: 1992, 1996
- Genre: Punk rock, pop punk
- Length: 38:03
- Label: Lookout!, Panic Button
- Producer: Mass Giorgini, Ben Weasel

Screeching Weasel chronology
Television City Dream (1998)	Beat Is On The Brat (1998)	Major Label Debut (1998)

Professional ratings
Review scores
Source	Rating
Allmusic	3/5 stars

Beat is on the Brat is a CD compilation of out of print and vinyl-only material from Screeching Weasel. The majority of the CD contains their cover of the first album by The Ramones in its entirety. The band was approached to cover the album at a party for the completion of their fourth album, Wiggle. Having just lost bassist Johnny Personality, the band was unsure of its future, and they claim that the recording of these covers helped revitalize them.

The band mixed the album just like the Ramones record, with the guitar panned hard to one side and the bass to the other. Very little was changed in terms of the songs themselves, though all were slightly faster than the originals. The album was recorded in approximately fifteen hours and released on vinyl on Selfless Records in a limited run of 1700 copies, 300 of which were on white vinyl. Selfless re-pressed 300 copies of the album in 1993 with silkscreened covers. The remaining tracks (15–18) are from the vinyl-only EP Formula 27. These songs were outtakes from the recording of the 1996 album, Bark Like a Dog.

== Track listing ==
- Tracks 1–11, 13-14 are by The Ramones. Track 12 by Jim Lee. Tracks 15-18 are by Ben Weasel.
1. "Blitzkrieg Bop" – 2:12
2. "Beat On The Brat" – 2:30
3. "Judy Is A Punk" – 1:30
4. "I Wanna Be Your Boyfriend" – 2:24
5. "Chainsaw" – 1:55
6. "Now I Wanna Sniff Some Glue" – 1:34
7. "I Don't Wanna Go Down To The Basement" – 2:35
8. "Loudmouth" – 2:14
9. "Havana Affair" – 2:00
10. "Listen To My Heart" – 1:56
11. "53rd & 3rd" – 2:19
12. "Let's Dance" – 1:51
13. "I Don't Wanna Walk Around With You" – 1:43
14. "Today Your Love, Tomorrow The World" – 2:09
15. "(Nothing's Gonna) Turn Me Off (Of You)" – 1:39
16. "Pretty Girls Don't Talk To Me" – 3:02
17. "I Don't Care Anymore" – 2:42
18. "Why'd You Have To Leave?" – 1:23

== Credits ==
- Ben Weasel - lead vocals on tracks 1-11 and 13–18, guitar on tracks 15–18
- Jughead - guitar
- Danny Vapid - bass, backing vocals, lead vocals on track 12
- Dan Panic - drums
