= Formula 27 =

EP by Screeching Weasel
- Released: 1997
- Recorded: 1996
- Genre: Punk rock, pop punk
- Label: Lookout!, Panic Button
- Producer: Mass Giorgini, Ben Weasel

Screeching Weasel chronology
Suzanne Is Getting Married (1994)	Formula 27 (1997)	Major Label Debut (1998)

Formula 27 is the ninth E.P. by Screeching Weasel. It was released as a companion to Bark Like a Dog, the band's first album after their second breakup. All four songs were recorded during the sessions for the album with the same lineup. This E.P. would be the last new material that the "classic" Screeching Weasel lineup of Weasel/Jughead/Vapid/Panic would release. All the songs deal with issues involving personal relationships and all but the first relate to relationship problems. The E.P. was released shortly after Bark Like A Dog on Vermiform Records (later reissue on Lookout! Records and Weasel's own imprint, Panic Button). It is now out of print, but the songs are available as bonus tracks on the album Beat Is on the Brat.

== Track listing ==
1. "(Nothing's Gonna) Turn Me Off (Of You)" – 1:39
2. "Pretty Girls Don't Talk To Me" – 3:02
3. "I Don't Care Anymore" – 2:42
4. "Why'd You Have to Leave?" – 1:23

All songs written by Ben Weasel.

== Personnel ==
Ben Weasel - vocals, guitar
Jughead - guitar
Danny Vapid - bass, backing vocals
Dan Panic - drums
