= Suzanne Is Getting Married =

Single by Screeching Weasel
- B-side: "Waiting for Susie"
- Released: 1994
- Recorded: June 14–24, 1994
- Genre: Punk rock, pop punk
- Length: 2:26
- Label: Lookout!
- Songwriter: Ben Weasel
- Producer: Mass Giorgini

Screeching Weasel singles chronology
"'Screeching Weasel / Born Against'" (1994)	"Suzanne Is Getting Married" (1994)	"Formula 27" (1997)

Alternative cover

"Suzanne Is Getting Married" is a song by punk rock band Screeching Weasel. It was released as a single in 1994 through Lookout! Records. The title track was written and released to commemorate the wedding of Maximumrocknroll's Suzanne Bartchy and publisher Ramsey Kanaan.

Both songs on the release were recorded during the sessions for the band's sixth studio album, How to Make Enemies and Irritate People. Mike Dirnt from Green Day performed on the album and played bass on "Suzanne Is Getting Married". Due to a scheduled performance on the Late Show with David Letterman, he was unable to perform on the B-side, "Waiting for Susie", so producer (and future full-time bassist) Mass Giorgini played bass on the song. "Waiting for Susie" was co-written with longtime bassist Dan Vapid; he left the band before these recording sessions began. The song was written for the group's fourth studio album Wiggle (1993) but was not recorded for it, and was later recorded for this release. The single is currently out of print, but both songs are included on the two-disc rarities compilation Thank You Very Little (2000).

== Track listing ==
Side A
No.	Title	Writer(s)	Length
1.	"Suzanne Is Getting Married"	Ben Weasel	2:26

Side B
No.	Title	Writer(s)	Length
2.	"Waiting for Susie"	Weasel, Dan Vapid	2:33
Total length:			4:59

== Personnel ==
- Ben Weasel - lead vocals, guitar
- Jughead - guitar
- Mike Dirnt - bass on track 1, backing vocals
- Mass Giorgini - bass on track 2
- Dan Panic - drums
- Gretchen Smear - backing vocals
