= Ramones covers album series =

Album series released by Selfless Records

Between 1993 and 2000, a series of Ramones covers albums were released by Selfless Records (later Clearview Records), an independent record label based in Garland, Texas specializing in punk rock, on which bands influenced by seminal punk group the Ramones performed cover versions of entire Ramones albums. Under the Selfless label, Screeching Weasel, the Queers, and the Vindictives respectively covered the first three Ramones albums: Ramones (1976), Rocket to Russia (1977), and Leave Home (1977). Selfless then became Clearview Records and continued the series, with Boris the Sprinkler, the Parasites, the Mr. T Experience, the Beatnik Termites, and the McRackins respectively covering End of the Century (1980), It's Alive (1979), Road to Ruin (1978), Pleasant Dreams (1981), and Too Tough to Die (1984).

Each entry in the series was issued as a limited edition LP record, with 1,400 copies pressed in the standard black, 300 on colored discs, and an additional 300 with an alternate screen printed cover intended for the band to sell on tour. Some of the albums were later re-released on compact disc by Clearview or other labels.

== Albums ==
Year	Artist	Album covered	Label	Catalog no.
1993	Screeching Weasel	Ramones (1976)	Selfless	SFLS 17
1994	The Queers	Rocket to Russia (1977)	Selfless	SFLS 28
1994	The Vindictives	Leave Home (1977)	Selfless	SFLS 32
1996	Boris the Sprinkler	End of the Century (1980)	Clearview	CRVW 42
1997	Parasites	It's Alive (1979)	Clearview	CRVW 49
1998	The Mr. T Experience	Road to Ruin (1978)	Clearview	CRVW 52
1998	Beatnik Termites	Pleasant Dreams (1981)	Clearview	CRVW 53
2000	The McRackins	Too Tough to Die (1984)	Clearview	CRVW 54

== Screeching Weasel – Ramones ==
The series began when Selfless Records head Todd Greene contacted Chicago-based band Screeching Weasel while they were celebrating the completion of recording sessions for their album Wiggle, asking if they would record their favorite Ramones album for his label. "It was a completely stupid idea," wrote singer Ben Weasel several years later, "so of course we did it. My favorite Ramones album is actually Leave Home, but we all agreed we could do a halfway decent job with their first album." They recorded the album with recording engineer Mass Giorgini at his Sonic Iguana Studios in Lafayette, Indiana, working from midnight on October 17, 1992 until 2:00 AM the following day, with the band members acting as record producers. "We recorded it at Sonic Iguana in something silly like fifteen hours", wrote Weasel, "and mixed it to sound like the first Ramones album (bass outta one speaker, guitar outta the other). It was stupid, but a lot of fun and it marks the only Screeching Weasel album on which [Dan] Vapid sang lead on a song ('Let's Dance')." The cover photograph mimics the Ramones cover, with the band members (guitarist John Jughead Pierson, drummer Dan Panic, Weasel, and bassist Vapid) pictured in black and white against a brick wall, wearing torn blue jeans, black leather jackets, and Ramones T-shirts.

Screeching Weasel later included four tracks from the album—"Judy Is a Punk", "Chain Saw", "Now I Wanna Sniff Some Glue", and "Havana Affair"—on their 1995 compilation album Kill the Musicians. In 1998 they paired the entire album with their 1996 EP Formula 27 as the compilation Beat Is on the Brat.

== The Queers – Rocket to Russia ==
North Hampton, New Hampshire-based band the Queers were the next to record an album in the series, covering 1977's Rocket to Russia. Their version was recorded at Flat Iron Studios in Chicago in 1994 with Ben Weasel as producer. According to singer and guitarist "Joe Queer" King and bassist Chris "B-Face" Barnard, it was recorded in a single day with no rehearsals. They later criticized other bands who spent more time rehearsing and recording their entries in the series, saying "You can't improve on the Ramones, they were the greatest punk rock band the world will ever know." The Queers' usual drummer, Hugh O'Neill, was on a forced leave of absence from the band; earlier that year, they had staged an intervention in order to convince him to stop using heroin. This accounted for his absence from Rocket to Russia and their following album, 1994's Beat Off. For Rocket to Russia they were joined by drummer Jay Adelberg. By April of that year Screeching Weasel drummer Dan Panic and bassist Dan Vapid had joined the Queers, and the band played as openers for the Ramones at a show in Hampton Beach, which Vapid later called the most pivotal moment of his time with the Queers.

After Selfless became Clearview Records, Rocket to Russia was reissued on compact disc in 1998 with the catalog number CRVW 28. Reviewing this version of the album for Allmusic, Stewart Mason rated it 2 stars out of 5, saying that of the albums in the series it was "probably the most faithful to the original. This is not at all surprising, considering head Queer Joe King's unswerving devotion to Ramones-style pop-punk in all of his band's own releases. All 14 songs, even the covers of Bobby Freeman's 'Do You Wanna Dance' and the Trashmen's 'Surfin' Bird', sound pretty much exactly like the originals with King's voice dubbed over Joey [Ramone]'s. It's all an impressive feat of mimicry, as well as a nice tribute to the group's obvious heroes. It doesn't make one want to listen to the album more than once, though." The album was remixed in December 2000 by King, Barnard, and producer and recording engineer Jim Tierney at the Electric Cave in Portsmouth, New Hampshire, and reissued in 2001 by Liberation Records (catalog number L 37838). This release added the Queers original "Blabbermouth" from the 1994 compilation Punk USA.

== The Vindictives – Leave Home ==
Chicago-based band the Vindictives recorded the third entry in the series, covering the 1977 Ramones album Leave Home. Their version was recorded on March 14, 1994 with producer and engineer Mark Schwarz at Vuber Studio in Chicago. Unlike Screeching Weasel and the Queers, the Vindictives made substantial changes to the structure of the album they were covering, rearranging the order of the songs, adding backing vocals and extended guitar solos, adding sound bites from the 1932 film Freaks to the song "Pinhead" (the film had inspired the original song), and adding sound effects to "Commando" and "Gimme Gimme Shock Treatment". The alternate screen printed cover for the tour edition of this album was illustrated by Chris Appelgren of Lookout! Records.

The Vindictives' version of Leave Home was reissued on LP and CD by Liberation Records in 1998 with new cover artwork by noted punk album art Illustrator, Mark deSalvo. (catalog number L 37808). Reviewing this edition for Allmusic, Mike DaRonco rated it two stars out of five in a negative review, calling it "a pretty redundant and worthless concept except for maybe calling attention to 'one of the greatest rock & roll bands ever', but at least Screeching Weasel had the decency to cover Ramones straight through without any changes. So not only do the Vindictives do their own version of classics like 'Sheena Is a Punk Rocker' and 'Pinhead' with extended guitar solos and unnecessary backing vocals, but none of the songs are in the order of the original version. Blasphemy!" Reviewer Tom Trauma of Punknews.org also gave a negative opinion of the album in 2016, rating it two and a half stars out of five and remarking that "Generally bands should be praised for pushing the envelope, but in this case there were probably more misses than hits." He criticized the guitar sound as "jagged" and "more metallic sounding" than the original, and said the album had "more lead guitar than Johnny [Ramone] played in his whole career." "The heavy Vindictives treatment may have worked if only used on a song or two", he concluded; "Over the course of 16 tracks it's just too much. They definitely swung for the fences. If they had connected, this might have been the masterpiece of the series. Ultimately, they're guilty of making a perfect, untouchable album into a mediocre one. As it turned out, it was the least listenable of the first three."

== Boris the Sprinkler – End of the Century ==
Later in 1994 Selfless Records changed its name to Clearview Records. In 1996 the label revived the Ramones covers series, with Boris the Sprinkler covering the band's 1980 album End of the Century. It was recorded in the band's home town of Green Bay, Wisconsin at Simple Studios, the basement studio of bassist "Eric No. 2" Thielen, who produced the album under the pseudonym Eric J. Simple. It was the first album in the series to be issued on CD by Clearview, in addition to the usual 2,000 LP copies. Reviewing it for Allmusic, Mike DaRonco rated it two stars out of five, saying that the band "openly admit during the long intro of 'Do You Remember Rock 'n' Roll Radio?' that what they're covering is one of the worst Ramones records ever released. Not that Rev. Nørb and company are wrong by any means, but they certainly don't improve upon End of the Century. Seriously, why would a band re-record an album in its entirety when it was already perfected the first time around?"

== Parasites – It's Alive ==
The Parasites, based in Berkeley, California, had the fifth entry in the series in 1997 with a cover of the Ramones' first live album, 1979's It's Alive. The original had been recorded on New Year's Eve, December 31, 1977; the Parasites similarly recorded their version on December 31, 1996 at famed Berkeley punk club 924 Gilman Street. It was mixed by Kurt Belch at HAM studio in Seattle. Rather than covering the entire album in its original 28-song, double LP form, the Parasites instead covered the pared-down, 20-song, single-LP version of the album that had been released only in Japan. This version of It's Alive had included a transcribed lyric sheet with numerous inaccuracies, including misheard transcriptions of Joey Ramone's between-song comments. The Parasites included this lyric sheet in their version of the album, and sang all of the lyrics according to how they were printed on the sheet, including all of the inaccuracies.

The liner notes were written by Boris the Sprinkler singer Rev. Nørb in April 1997; In them, he claimed that Boris the Sprinkler had originally been slated to cover 1978's Road to Ruin, which was the next Ramones studio album after Leave Home and Rocket to Russia, but while he felt that "half that album is totally great, and cannot be improved upon by mere mortals, the other half is utter dreck that I wouldn't sing if you put a goddamned bazooka to my head", and so had asked Greene if they could cover It's Alive instead, reasoning that it technically followed Rocket to Russia in the Ramones' discography. Greene had declined on the grounds that It's Alive consisted entirely of songs from the first three Ramones albums, which had already been covered by Screeching Weasel, the Vindictives, and the Queers, though Rev. Nørb suspected that it was really because Greene did not want to finance a double live album. They had settled for Boris the Sprinkler covering End of the Century instead. Nørb had forgotten that the shorter, Japan-only edition of It's Alive existed, and gave credit to Parasites singer and guitarist Dave Parasite for owning a copy and convincing Greene to have his band cover it.

The Parasites' version of It's Alive was reissued on CD in 2008 by Kid Tested Records, with the catalog number KTR 002.

== The Mr. T Experience – Road to Ruin ==
Another Berkeley band, the Mr. T Experience, provided the next installment in the series with their cover of 1978's Road to Ruin. Their version was recorded at Foxhound Studio in Oakland with producer and engineer Kevin Army, and featured Penelope Houston of the Avengers as a guest vocalist on "Questioningly".

== Beatnik Termites – Pleasant Dreams ==
The Beatnik Termites from Cleveland, Ohio recorded the seventh album in the series with their cover version of 1981's Pleasant Dreams. Like Screeching Weasel had, they recorded their album at Sonic Iguana Studios in Lafayette, Indiana with producer and engineer Mass Giorgini. Ray Ahn of Australian punk band the Hard-Ons played bass guitar on the record as a special guest. The band released a CD version of the album on their own imprint, Insubordination Records, with the catalog number ISR 030. The Beatnik Termites' version of the album was mentioned in the liner notes of the 2002 remastered edition of the Ramones' Pleasant Dreams published by Rhino Entertainment.

== The McRackins – Too Tough to Die ==
Canadian band the McRackins, from Vancouver, had the final entry in the series, covering the Ramones' 1984 album Too Tough to Die in 2000. Produced by Todd Stefanson and singer and guitarist Bil McRackin, it was co-released with Berkeley-based label Coldfront Records (catalog number CF 044).

== Other Bands Continue the Project ==
Punk bands on other independent labels have continued the project of covering the Ramones discography, independently of Clearview/Selfless. In 1998, Liberation Records released a version of Too Tough to Die by Jon Cougar Concentration Camp (this was released before the final Selfless/Clearview entry, by McRackins, of that same album). In 2004, a Norwegian band known as the Tip Toppers recorded a cover of Subterranean Jungle (1983), which had been skipped over in the original series. The Kobanes and the New Rochelles continued the tradition, releasing covers of the next two albums from the Ramones' discography (doing so in flipped chronology, just as Rocket to Russia and Leave Home were released out of sequence in the original series, and then Road to Ruin and End of the Century were also released out of order). The Kobanes released a cover of Halfway to Sanity (1987) in 2011, while the New Rochelles tackled Animal Boy (1986) in 2019. Spain's K7s recorded a cover of Mondo Bizarro in 2021. In 2022 Geoff Palmer added a twist to the Ramones tribute series by covering the infamous 1989 Dee Dee King rap album Standing in the Spotlight, while the Canceled Sitcoms recorded another version of Leave Home this same year. DeeCRACKS teamed with Andrea Manges from the Manges to record a cover of Brain Drain in 2024. To date, the only of the Ramones 14 studio albums to have not been covered in their entirety are their last two- Acid Eaters (itself a covers album), and Adios Amigos.

Year	Artist	Album covered	Label	Catalog no.
1998	Jon Cougar Concentration Camp	Too Tough to Die (1984)	Liberation Records	L-37810
2004	The Tip Toppers	Subterranean Jungle (1983)	Ramones Fans Norway	r5775596
2011	The Kobanes	Halfway to Sanity (1987)	Fixing a Hole	Fix-54
2019	The New Rochelles	Animal Boy (1986)	Hey Pizza! Records	HPR001
2021	K7s	Mondo Bizarro	Stardumb Records	SDR 90
2022	The Canceled Sitcoms	Leave Home (1977)	Blitzkrieg Cat Records	
2022	Geoff Palmer	Standing in the Spotlight (1989)	Stardumb Records	SDR-99
2024	DeeCRACKS with Andrea Manges	Brain Drain (1989.)	Striped Records	STR045-LP
