= Kill the Musicians =

Compilation album by Screeching Weasel
- Released: 1995, 2005
- Recorded: 1989–1994
- Genre: Punk rock, pop punk, skate punk
- Label: Lookout!, Asian Man
- Producer: Mass Giorgini, Ben Weasel, Screeching Weasel, Mike Potential, Steve Albini, Andy Ernst

Screeching Weasel chronology
How to Make Enemies and Irritate People (1994)	Kill the Musicians (1995)	Bark Like a Dog (1996)

Professional ratings
Review scores
Source	Rating
AllMusic	4/5 stars

Kill the Musicians is a compilation album released in 1995 which was meant to serve as a "cleaning up" of loose ends after Screeching Weasel's breakup in 1994. The compilation collects demos, B-sides, vinyl-only EPs, and other various odds and ends the band had accumulated in their career from 1989 to 1994. It came on the heels of 1994's How to Make Enemies and Irritate People, which itself was a collection of the final songs the band had written prior to splitting up. The band would soon reform in 1996 and remain together again until 2000, when they disbanded again. This collection was out of print for a short period until it was remastered and re-released by Asian Man Records in 2005. The original album contained an in-depth essay written by Ben Weasel covering the history of the band. This was later omitted from the re-issue. In 2010, Recess Records had intentions to release a double LP vinyl reissue, however production was aborted and only a small amount of test pressings exist.

== Track listing ==
1. "Kamala's Too Nice" (Weasel, Vapid) – 1:26
2. "Punkhouse" (Weasel, Jughead) – 2:14
3. "Fathead" (Weasel, Vapid, Jughead) – 1:16
4. "Good Morning" (Weasel) – 2:16
5. "I Need Therapy" (Weasel) – 1:21
6. "I Think We're Alone Now" (Ritchie Cordell) – 0:57
7. "Something Wrong" (Screeching Weasel) – 1:50
8. "This Bud's for Me" (Screeching Weasel) – 2:08
9. "I Wanna Be a Homosexual" (Weasel, Jughead, Vapid) – 3:04
10. "She's Giving Me the Creeps" (Weasel, Vapid) – 2:23
11. "I Fall to Pieces" (Hank Cochran, Harlan Howard) – 2:11
12. "Celena" (Weasel) – 3:49
13. "Radio Blast" (Weasel, Vapid) – 3:58
14. "The Girl Next Door" (Weasel) – 3:12
15. "Achtung" (Authorities) – 2:19
16. "Judy Is a Punk" (Douglas Colvin, John Cummings, Thomas Erdelyi, Jeffrey Hyman) – 1:21
17. "Chainsaw" (Colvin, Cummings, Erdelyi, Hyman) – 1:55
18. "Now I Wanna Sniff Some Glue" (Colvin, Cummings, Erdelyi, Hyman) – 1:21
19. "Havana Affair" (Colvin, Cummings, Erdelyi, Hyman) – 1:38
20. "Soap Opera" (Weasel) – 2:37
21. "Stab Stab Stab" (Weasel) – 3:00
22. "Six A. M." (Weasel) – 2:16
23. "Hey Suburbia" (Weasel, Jughead) – 2:46
24. "The American Dream" (Weasel) – 0:39
25. "Mary Was an Anarchist" (Weasel) – 3:15
26. "Around on You" (Weasel, Vapid) – 2:50
27. "Goodbye to You" (Weasel, Vapid) – 1:44
28. "Veronica Hates Me" (live) (Weasel) – 3:02
29. "I Can See Clearly" (live) (Johnny Nash) – 2:19
30. "Supermarket Fantasy" (live) (Weasel) – 1:30
31. "The Science of Myth" (live) (Weasel) – 2:14
- Track 1 previously released on the What Are You Pointing At? compilation 10-inch (Very Small Records, 1989)
- Tracks 2–7 previously released as the Punkhouse 7-inch EP (Limited Potential, 1989)
- Track 8 previously released on the They Don't Get Laid, They Don't Get Paid, But Boy, Do They Work Hard compilation LP (Maximum RockNRoll Records, 1989)
- Tracks 9–11 previously released as the Pervo-Devo 7-inch EP (Shred of Dignity, 1992)
- Track 12 previously released on the It's a Punk Thing, You Wouldn't Understand compilation LP (Shakefork Records, 1993)
- Tracks 13 & 14 previously released as the "Radio Blast" 7-inch single (Underdog Records, 1993)
- Tracks 16–19 previously released on the Ramones LP (Selfless Records, 1993)
- Track 20 previously released on the Fallen Upon Deaf Ears compilation 10-inch (Skullduggery, 1994)
- Track 21 previously released on the Screeching Weasel / Pink Lincolns split 7-inch EP (VML Records, 1993)
- Tracks 24–27 previously released as the You Broke My Fucking Heart 7-inch EP (Lookout! Records, 1993).
- Tracks 15, 22, 23, 28–31 previously unreleased

== Personnel ==
- Ben Weasel - lead vocals, guitar (tracks 1–8, 20–31)
- Jughead - guitar
- Danny Vapid - backing vocals, bass (tracks 1–8, 16–31), guitar (tracks 9–15)
- Dan Panic - drums (tracks 9–31)
- Brian Vermin - drums (tracks 1–8)
- Dave Naked - bass (tracks 9–11)
- Johnny Personality - bass (tracks 12–15)
