= Major Label Debut =

EP by Screeching Weasel
- Released: January 27, 1998
- Recorded: September 10–13, 1997 at Uberstudio, Chicago, IL
- Genre: Punk rock
- Label: Panic Button Records

Screeching Weasel chronology
Beat Is on the Brat (1998)	Major Label Debut (1998)	Emo (1999)

Professional ratings
Review scores
Source	Rating
Allmusic	3/5 stars

Major Label Debut is the tenth EP by Chicago punk rock band Screeching Weasel. Despite the name, the E.P. was the first release on Panic Button Records, an independent record label owned by band members Ben Weasel and John Jughead.

A different recording of the song "Nightbreed" would later appear on the band's rarities album Thank You Very Little, while "Racist Society" would later appear on the greatest hits album Weasel Mania.

== Track listing ==
1. "The Last Janelle" - 0:58
2. "D.I.Y." - 1:55
3. "Compact Disc" - 2:01
4. "Hey Asshole" - 1:16
5. "Racist Society" - 1:57
6. "Nightbreed" - 2:16

== Personnel ==
- Ben Weasel- vocals
- John Jughead- guitar
- Zac Damon- guitar, backing vocals
- Mass Giorgini- bass
- Dan Lumley- drums
