= Squirtgun =

American punk rock band

- Origin: Lafayette, Indiana, U.S.
- Genres: Punk rock
- Years active: 1993–1998; 2001–2004; 2008–present
- Labels: Go-Kart Records, Honest Don's Records, Lookout! Records
- Members: Mass Giorgini; Dan Panic; Zac Damon; Kevin Sierzega
- Past members: Dan Lumley; Matt Hart; Flav Giorgini; Mike Felumlee; Matt Leonard
- Website: www.squirtgun.net

Squirtgun is an American punk rock band from Lafayette, Indiana formed by record producer Mass Giorgini in 1993.

== History ==
=== 1993–1998 ===
Squirtgun originally consisted of Mass Giorgini (Bass, Vocals), Matt Hart (Vocals, Guitar), Flav Giorgini (Guitar), and Dan Lumley (Drums), growing out of previous West Lafayette, IN bands Rattail Grenadier and Teeth and the Man.

The band signed to Lookout! Records and their first release was the EP Shenanigans, in the Spring of 1995, followed by their self-titled debut album that fall. Billie Joe Armstrong of Green Day, recommended Squirtgun to Jeff Saltzman, the music advisor for the then-upcoming Kevin Smith film Mallrats. Squirtgun's song "Social" was featured in the opening credits of Mallrats and appeared on the film's soundtrack.

In 1996 the band released their second EP, Mary Ann, a tribute to the character from Gilligan's Island. A video was filmed for the title track, and featured an appearance from Mary Ann herself, actress Dawn Wells. The video was released in the Spring of 1997 and shown on MTV's 120 Minutes and put into regular rotation on MTV2.

Squirtgun's second full-length, Another Sunny Afternoon, was also released in the Spring of '97. Several songs from Another Sunny Afternoon were featured in major motion pictures and TV shows, including "Come On Let's Go" in The Extreme Adventures of Super Dave, "You're the Greatest" on Fox Television Network's Clueless sitcom, "My Jeannette" in the Disney film My Date with the President's Daughter and "Hey Louise" in the Disney film Alley Cats Strike.

=== Hiatus ===
In fall 1998, Squirtgun went on a hiatus in order to pursue other interests and other band projects.

Mass and Dan joined Screeching Weasel, recording the albums Major Label Debut, Television City Dream, Emo, and Teen Punks In Heat. The two also formed Common Rider with singer/guitarist Jesse Michaels (formerly of Operation Ivy), releasing two full-length albums, the self-titled and This is Unity Music and touring extensively in 2002. Dan also drummed on albums by the Mopes, The Methadones, The Riverdales, The Riptides, and Even In Blackouts.

While Mass is primarily known for having founded Sonic Iguana Studios and for his production career, having produced music for Rise Against, Alkaline Trio, Anti-Flag, the Smugglers and many other punk bands, he is also an accomplished academician. Mass earned a Ph.D. in Spanish Literature with a focus on the Golden Age from Purdue University and has appeared at numerous academic conferences and published book chapters and articles in literary and scholarly journals. He has taught graduate and undergraduate courses at Purdue University in Italian, Spanish, and Theatre, and was also an assistant professor of Humanities at Ivy Tech Community College in Lafayette, Indiana. Mass continues to produce and master albums for several international recording artists.

Matt received his MFA in creative writing and began teaching in the Academic Studies Department at the Art Academy of Cincinnati, a four-year college of Art and Design, and has since been promoted to head of their Liberal Arts department. His poems and reviews have been published in numerous literary journals, including Conduit, Ploughshares, and Spinning Jenny. He is the editor of Forklift, Ohio: A Journal of Poetry, Cooking & Light Industrial Safety.

Flav also took an academic route, earning a Ph.D. degree in molecular genetics and publishing manuscripts in several respected scientific journals, including Development and Molecular and Cellular Biology. He also founded guitarpunk.com and the GPC guitar company, designing original guitars used by bands such as Alkaline Trio, Screeching Weasel, The Queers, Allister and many more. He is currently the frontman of UK-based punk group The Phase Problem. They have released two albums, a self-titled debut in March 2023, which was mastered by Mass, and The Power of Positive Thinking in April 2024.

Dan Lumley was a founding member of Squirtgun, and also spent several years working as a drum tech and editing engineer at Sonic Iguana Studios, assisting on albums by bands such as Rise Against, Anti-Flag and The Queers, all for which he also performed at some point in some musical capacity. Lumley has also been a member of Screeching Weasel, the Riverdales, the Methadones, the Mopes, The Riptides, and Torture the Artist.

Zac Damon has performed with Squirtgun since 1995, when he toured as the lead singer and rhythm guitarist immediately following the release of the band's debut Lookout Records album. Damon has regularly participated in touring and recording with Squirtgun, performing with the band extensively across the United States and Europe. Damon also wrote a pair of songs recorded by the band: "Dysfynctional," which appeared on the Squirtgun/Teen Idols split EP "The Dysfunctional Shadowman," and "Trial and Error," which appeared on the album "Fade to Bright." Damon is also in the current lineup of Squirtgun, which most recently performed at the Lookouting Festival at 924 Gilman in Berkeley, California on January 7, 2017.

Dan Panic joined Squirtgun as drummer in late 2016, first performing with the band on January 6, 2017, in Reno, Nevada, and again the subsequent day in Berkeley at the Lookouting Festival at 924 Gilman in Berkeley, California. Panic first met Mass Giorgini in December 1991, while Rattail Grenadier and Screeching Weasel played some tour dates together. Mass later produced nine albums on which Panic performed, including albums for Screeching Weasel, Riverdales, the Queers, and the Groovie Ghoulies. Beyond these bands, Panic has also played in Pansy Division, the Avengers, Common Rider, the Plus Ones, and Beulah, with which he appeared on the Conan O'Brien Show.

Matt Leonard (The Phuzz, The Maxies) was a member with Squirtgun from 1996 to 1998. He played guitar and sang lead vocals on two songs on Squirtgun's Another Sunny Afternoon album. Leonard penned the two songs he sung on the album, "Hey Louise" and "My Jeannette." Both of these songs were included in Disney films: the former in "My Date With The Presidents Daughter" and the latter in "Alley Cats Strike". He added backing vocals and guitar on four songs during the sessions for the Mary Ann and White Christmas EPs. Leonard also played guitar and performed lead vocals while touring. Leonard is now the lead singer of pop punk band The Maxies (Its Alive Records, RockRidge/Warner Bros.)

=== 2001–2004 ===
In the summer of 2001, Squirtgun regrouped and began work on the album Fade To Bright, for Honest Don's Records. Fade To Bright was released in Summer 2003, supported by a US tour. In the Fall of 2003, legendary punk rock drummer Mike Felumlee (Smoking Popes, Alkaline Trio) replaced Dan on drums, and Squirtgun hit the road with The Ataris, Hopesfall, and Planes Mistaken for Stars. Also, in 2003 Squirtgun recorded "Make it wreck", a song with the contribution of the vocalist of Anti-Flag, Geovanny Duran (the vocalist of El Guato, a ska/punk Costa Rican band), and two more important punk rockers. In the spring of 2004, Squirtgun toured the UK.

=== 2008–present ===
Squirtgun played their first show in almost 4 years in their hometown of Lafayette on February 9, 2008, at 'The Venue'. Over 400 people attended the show, however, almost 600 showed up for the performance; the owners were forced to prevent a large number of people from entering the business because the building was far beyond its safe capacity. It was a benefit show for the local YWCA, featuring the band's original line up, and the concert was recorded and released as a live album titled Broadcast 02.09.08, released by Go Kart Records in December 2008. Squirtgun also appeared at the 2009 Insubordination Fest in Baltimore and played shows with the Teen Idols and 88 Fingers Louie in Chicago and Lafayette, IN. A European tour followed in July 2009, with shows in England, the Netherlands, Germany, the Czech Republic, Italy, and France.

== Members ==
=== Current members ===
- Zac Damon - lead vocals, guitar (1995–1998, 2001–2004, 2008–present)
- Mass Giorgini - vocals, bass (1993–1998, 2001–2004, 2008–present)
- Kevin Sierzega - vocals (2001–2004, 2008–present)
- Dan Panic - drums (2016–present)

=== Former members ===
- Matt Hart - lead vocals, guitar (1993–1998)
- Flav Giorgini - guitar (1993–1998)
- Matt Leonard - lead vocals, guitar (1996–1998)
- Dan Lumley - drums (1993–1998)
- Mike Felumlee - drums (2001–2004, 2008–2016)

== Discography ==
=== Albums ===
- Squirtgun (Lookout! Records)
- Another Sunny Afternoon (Lookout! Records)
- Fade to Bright (Honest Don's/Fat Wreck Chords)
- Broadcast 02.09.08 (Kid Tested/Go-Kart Records)

=== EPs and Singles ===
- Shenanigans EP (1995) (Lookout! Records)
- Blue Christmas Single (1995) (Sonic Iguana Records)
- Mary Ann EP (1996) (Lookout! Records)
- White Christmas Single (1997) (Sonic Iguana Records)
- Jingle-Bell Rock Single (1999) (Interpunk Records)
- Live in Italy Split Single with the Real Swinger (2000) (Ballroom Blitz Records)
- The Dysfunctional Shadowman Split EP with Teen Idols (2002) (Asian Man Records)
