= Parasites (band) =

American pop punk band

- Origin: New Jersey
- Genres: Punk rock; pop punk
- Years active: 1986–2003, 2006–present
- Labels: Waterslide; Something to Do; Electrified Hair; Radcore; Shredder; Radiation; Slumberland; Munster; Just Add Water; Wingnut; Lookout!; Clearview; Go-Kart; Kid Tested; Rock Indiana; Inya Face; Unless You Try; CR Japan; Eccentric Pop; Rad Girlfriend; Dead Broke; Cleopatra; Mom's Basement; Otitis Media
- Members: Dave Parasite; Alex Rydzewski; Pat Holland

Parasites are an American pop-punk band. They were formed in 1986 by guitarist / singer Dave Parasite and bassist Ron Nole in New Jersey. Dave later relocated to Berkeley, California, and continued with a new lineup during the heyday of Lookout! Records and the Bay Area pop-punk revival.

Parasites have been releasing records since 1987 and have toured the United States, Europe and Japan extensively. They have played with Green Day, Rancid, NOFX, Bad Religion, Buzzcocks, Jawbreaker, The Queers, Lunachicks, Fear, The Adicts, Channel 3, Dayglo Abortions, JFA, Good Riddance, Street Dogs, Teenage Bottlerocket, The Mr. T Experience, Smoking Popes, Dillinger Four, The Ataris, Swingin' Utters, Weston, Ben Weasel, The Ergs!, The Methadones, The Lillingtons, Squirtgun, D.O.A., The Vibrators, Los Crudos, Sloppy Seconds, Dan Vapid and the Cheats, Voodoo Glow Skulls, Down by Law, Avail, J Church, The Travoltas, The Apers, Sonic Dolls, Banner Pilot, Iron Chic, Boris the Sprinkler, F.Y.P, Lemuria, Masked Intruder, and thousands of other bands.

After taking a break in 2003, the band reunited in 2006 to release Retro-Pop Remasters, a "Best Of" compilation, on Go Kart Records. It was promoted with a US tour in November 2006 with the Ergs!. They appeared at Insubordination Fest in 2008. They have seen released new albums: "Solitary" in 2009, and "Non Stop Power Pop" in 2012, both on Kid Tested Records, Dave Parasite's imprint label of Go Kart Records, as well as many other releases. The band has toured in 1993, 1994, 1995, 1996, 1997, 1998, 2000, 2002, 2006, 2007, 2009, 2012, 2013, 2014, 2015, 2016, 2017 and 2018 and a 28 band Parasites Tribute album, Paracomp, was released in 2015. Between albums, singles, EPs, splits, and compilations, they have over 100 releases.

== Discography ==
=== Studio albums ===
- Punk Rock For The 80's cassette (self-released, 1987)
- Pair of Sides LP and cassette (Shredder Records, 1990)
  - Remastered Reissue - Violated Records (CD 2016, LP 2018)
- Punch Lines CD (Shredder Records, 1993)
  - Reissue - Munster Records, Spain (1994, LP)
- Pair CD (Shredder Records, 1994)
  - Reissue - Munster Records, Spain (1994, LP)
- It's Alive LP (Clearview Records, 1997) - cover of It's Alive (Ramones)
  - Reissue - Kid Tested Records, US (2008, CD)
- Rat Ass Pie CD, LP, and cassette (Go Kart Records, 1998)
- Solitary CD and LP (Kid Tested Records, 2009)
  - Reissue - Inya Face Records, Japan (2009, CD)
  - Reissue - Rock Indiana Records, Spain (2009, CD)
  - Reissue - Unless You Try Records, UK (2009, LP)
- Non Stop Power Pop Volume 1 CD (Kid Tested Records, 2012)
  - Reissue - Kid Tested Records / CR Japan, Japan (2012, CD)
  - Reissue - Eccentric Pop Records, US (2013, LP)

=== Live albums ===
- Nyquil Fueled Rock Armada CD (Wingnut Records, 1996)
  - Reissue - Munster Records, Spain (1996, 2 x LP)
- Rock You Like A Funnel Cake (Live in Chicago 2015) CD (self-released, 2015)

=== Compilation albums ===
- Compost CD (Go Kart Records, 2000)
- Retro Pop Remasters CD (Go Kart Records, 2006)
  - Reissue - Go Kart Europe Records, Germany (2007, CD)
  - Remastered Reissue - Otitis Media Records, US (2021, LP, CD, cassette)

=== Extended plays ===
- Let's Have Fun - 5 Track 7-inch EP - Electrified Hair Records - self released, US (1987)
- Lost In the 80's - 5 Track 7-inch EP - Electrified Hair Records - self released, US (1987)
- Where the Kids Are - 4 Track 7-inch EP - Electrified Hair Records - self released, US (1990)
- Beat on Iraq - (As The Creeping Illness) - 3 Track 7-inch EP- Electrified Hair Records, US / Radcore Records, US (1991)
- En Homage Aux Beatles - 3 Track 7-inch EP - Shredder Records, US (1991)
- Paramania - 3 Track 7-inch EP - Shredder Records, US (1991)
- Burnt Toast - 3 Track 7-inch EP - Just Add Water Records, US (1995)
- No Martyr - 3 Track 7-inch EP - Munster Records, Spain (1997)
- Hang Up - 3 Track 7-inch EP - Lookout! Records, US (1997)
- Dave Parasite Back to Demo '89 -'91 - 6 Track Double 7-inch EP - American Pop Project Records, US (1997)
- EP-onymous - 5 Track 7-inch EP - Otitis Media Records, US (2023)
- Self Titled - 4 Track 12-inch EP - Something To Do Records (US), 4 track CD EP - Waterslide Records (Japan) (2026)

=== Live extended plays ===
- V.M.Live Presents: Parasites 12/3/94 - 5 Track 7-inch EP - V.M.L. Records, US (1995)
- V.M.Live Presents: Parasites 5/3/96 - 4 Track 7-inch EP V.M.L. Records, US (1997)

=== Singles ===
- Last Caress - 2 Track 7-inch Single - Shredder Records, US (1991)
- Crazy - 2 Track 7-inch Single - Radiation Records, Spain (1992)
- Letdown - 2 Track 7-inch Single - Shredder Records, US (1992)
- Something to Hold On To - 2 Track 7-inch Single - Slumberland Records, US (1993)
- I Almost Loved You - 2 Track 7-inch - Just Add Water Records US (1995)
  - Reissue - Insubordination Records, US (1996)
- Top Secret - 2 Track 7-inch Single - Rocco Records, US (1996)
- Intergalactic Love - Digital Single - Something To Do Records - (2019)
- Swept Away - Digital Single - Something To Do Records - (2020)

=== Split releases ===
- Live Nightmares EP - 6 Track Split 7-inch EP with Mourning Noise - Radcore Records, US (1990)
- Borisites / Nikki the Sprinkler - 4 Track Split 7-inch EP with Boris the Sprinkler - Just Add Water Records, US (1998)
- Never Mean That Much To You - 4 Way Split 7-inch EP - Eccentric Pop Records, US (2013)
- Parasites / Raging Nathans - 4 Track Split 7-inch EP - Rad Girlfriend Records US / Dead Broke Rekerds US / Unless You Try Records UK (2018)
- Parasites / Lone Wolf - Passport Series Volume 4 - 4 Track Split 7-inch EP - Mom's Basement Records US (2020)

=== Compilation appearances ===
- Praise Grandma - Bad Newz cassette Zine #4 - Bad Newz Recordings cassette, US (1987)
- New Jersey And New York Takeover #1 - HCP Records cassette, US (1987)
- New Jersey And New York Takeover #7 - HCP Records cassette, US (1988)
- Voice Of Americanism - Bad Newz cassette Zine #6 - Bad Newz Recordings cassette, US (1987)
- New Jersey And New York Takeover #8 - HCP Records cassette, US (1988)
- Bands Only a Mutha Could Love - Mutha Records CD, US (1988)
- Brain Food - Dead Issue Records LP, US (1989)
- The World's In Shreds Vol.4 - NJ - Shredder Records 7-inch EP, US (1990)
- JD's Jukebox Top Ten - JD's cassette, Canada (1990)
- Vicious Times Tape Show #2 - cassette, Germany (1991)
- Mordam Records In-Store Sampler - Mordam Records CD, US (1992)10
- Shreds Volume 1, Shredder Records CD, US (1993)
- Modern Needs 1, Teenage Keks Tapes, cassette, Germany (1993)
- I Hear Ya! - Caroline Distribution Sampler Spring 1994 - Caroline Records CD, US (1994)
- Teenage Kicks - Custodial Records 10-inch EP, US (1995), Liberation Records, CD US (1997)
- Punk Rock Mega Explosion - Factory/Conforte CD, Spain (1995)
- Reno Dustpunk Summer '95 Sampler - 702 Records cassette, US (1995)
- Homage - Coolidge Records CD, US (1995)
- Water Music - Just Add Water Records CD, US (1995)
  - Reissue - Rhetoric Records LP, US (1996)
- LA 1a Internacional - Munster Records CD, Spain (1995)
- The Big Giveaway - Mordam Records CD, US (1996)
- Punk + - K-Tel Records CD, Finland (1996)
- I Can't Believe It's Not Water - Just Add Water Records CD, US (1996)
  - Reissue - Rhetoric Records LP, US (1997)
- Shreds Volume 3 - Shredder Records CD, US (1996)
- Keep the Beat - Hairball 8 Records CD, US (1996)
- Rational Inquirer New Music Sampler- Rational Inquirer CD, US (1996)
- Back Asswards - Interbang Records CD, US (1996)
- El Ataque De La Gente N.O.T. - N.O.T. Records CD, Spain (1996)
- More Bounce to the Ounce - Lookout! Records 2×CD + 2×LP, US (1997)
- The Great Soap Opera - Wormhole/Atomic Tomato Records CD, US(1997)
- Dictators Forever Forever Dictators Vol. II - Roto Records CD, Spain (1997)
- The Last Great Thing You Did - Lookout! Records CD, US (1997)
- The Check's In The Mail - Rocco Records CD, US (1998)
- Skippy - Go Kart Records CD, US (1998)
- Punk Chartbusters Vol. 3 - Wolverine Records 2×CD, Germany (1998)
- Double Exposure - Go Kart Records / Black Rat Recordings 2×CD, US (1998)
- I Hear Ya! Caroline Distribution Sampler Summer 1998 - Caroline Records CD, US (1998)
- Go Kart Kissin' Cousins Weekend - Go Kart Records CD, US (1999)
- Poop Mixed With Pee - Poo Pee Records CD, US (1999)
- Go Kart Vs. The Corporate Giant Vol. 2 - Go Kart Records CD, US (1999)
- Grease - The Not So Original Soundtrack - Dummy Up Records CD, US (1999)
- Terror Firmer Soundtrack - Go Kart Records CD, US (1999)
- Cooler Than Your Mom - Warped Tour Sampler 2×CD, US (1999)
- V. M. Live Presents... - V.M.L. Records / Liberation Records CD, US (1999)
- Go-Kart Records Navarre Sampler - GoKart Records CD, US (1999)
- Indies Punx Collection - Two Children Records CD, Japan (2000)
- Go Kart MP300 Raceway - Go Kart Records CD, US (2003)
- Go Kart Vs. The Corporate Giant Vol. 4 - Go Kart Records CD, US (2006)
- Pop Punk's Not Dead - Go Kart Records CD, US (2007)
- Let's Do It For Lance - Jerk off Records CD, US (2007)
- Insubordination Fest 2007 - Insubordination Records CD/DVD, US (2007)
- God Save The Queers - Asian Man Records CD, US (2008)
- The World's In Shreds Boxed Set - Shredder Records US (2008)
- Let's Go Ghoulie - Knowhere Records CD, US (2008)
- Insubordination Fest 2008 - Insubordination Records CD/DVD, US (2008)
- Open 24 Hours - Diner Junkie Records CD, US (2009)
- Knowhere Records CD Sampler - Knowhere Records CDR, US (2009?)
- Tribute To The Avengers - CD Presents Digital Download, US (2010)
- Project Playlist - Digital Download, US (2013)
- Mooster Mania 3 - Mooster Records CD, US (2013)
- Sorry To Keep You Waiting - Infested Records CD, US (2013), Critical Mass Music, CD US (2024)
- Awesome Fest Siete 7 - Imprint / Awesome Fest Records CD, US (2013)
- Rebel Souls - Ramone To The Bone Digital Download, Germany (2013)
- Underground Punk Vol 1 - Ripped Records CD, US (2014)
- All About Girls - Ramone To The Bone Digital Download, Germany (2014)
- Tales From The Pop-Punk-World Vol. 2 - Ramone To The Bone Digital Download, Germany (2015)
- Swamp Comp 4 - Swamp Cabbage Records cassette, US (2017)
- Year Of The Dog - Dead Broke Rekerds Digital Download, US (2019)
- Do You Remember Me - Mom's Basement Records LP, US (2019)
- Punk Rock Halloween 2 - Louder Faster + Scarier Cleopatra Records 2×CD, US (2019)
- Dead Wax - Rad Girlfriend Records 2×LP, US (2019)
- Punk Rock Christmas 2 Cleopatra Records 2×CD, US (2019)
- Something To Do Music For Something To Do People, Phase One - Something To Do Records LP + CD, US (2020)
- 2020 (Celebrating 20 Years of Stardumb Records) - Stardumb Records 2×LP + CD, Netherlands (2020)
- Memorable But Not Honorable Mix Tape Vol. 6 - Memorable But Not Honorable, US (2021)
- Something To Do Music For Something To Do People, Phase Two - Something To Do Records LP, US (2023) *115 / 133

=== Tributes and covers ===
- Stereo Hysteria's 2013 Artists Of The Month - Digital Download, US (2013)
- Parasongs: A Parasites Tribute - CD, US (Kid Tested Records, 2015)
  - cassette, US (Swamp Cabbage Records, 2015)
- Hindsight Is 20/20, My Friend Vol. 2: Okay, Enough Reminiscing- Digital Download (2016)
  - Remastered and Reissued by Creep Records - LP, CD (2022)
- Crazy - limited edition flexi disc (self-released by Less Than Jake, 2016)
