= The Lillingtons =

American pop punk band

- Origin: Newcastle, Wyoming, United States
- Genres: Pop-punk
- Years active: 1995–2001; 2003; 2006–2008; 2013–2015; 2017–2020
- Labels: Clearview, Red Scare, Lookout!, Panic Button, Fat Wreck Chords
- Spinoffs: Teenage Bottlerocket
- Members: Kody Templeman; Tim O'Hara; Cory Laurence; Alex Volonino
- Past members: Zack Rawhauser
- Website: Lillingtons official Facebook page

The Lillingtons were a pop-punk band formed in 1995 in Newcastle, Wyoming. The band is composed of its original members, vocalist and lead guitarist Kody Templeman, drummer Tim O’Hara, bassist Cory Laurence, and later added rhythm guitarist Alex Volonino.

== History ==
The original lineup consisting of Kody Templeman, Zack Rawhauser, Cory Laurence, and Tim (Timmy V) O'Hara as a four-piece only recorded the first 7","I Lost My Marbles", produced by Joe King of The Queers for his More Bounce to the Ounce compilation CD. The band continued as a three-piece after Zack quit.

Their first full-length album, titled Shit Out of Luck, was released on Clearview Records in 1996. Following the release of their first album the band changed their lyrical focus. In 1999 they went into the studio with producer-engineer Mass Giorgini to record a new LP. This was done with the band's own money, and without the benefit of a record label. The result was Death by Television, released on March 30, 1999, an album that took sci-fi movie-themed songs such as "War Of The Worlds" and "Invasion Of The Saucermen" and combined them with tracks that made references to other retro themes, such as "X-Ray Specs." The recordings instantly created a buzz. Successful label Fat Wreck Chords offered to release the album, but the band had already accepted an offer. They signed with Panic Button Records, an imprint of influential punk label Lookout! Records that was overseen by Ben Weasel and John Jughead Pierson of Screeching Weasel fame.

The band spent the next two years touring heavily within the punk scene and disbanded after teaming with Giorgini for their final Panic Button/Lookout! release, the spy-themed LP The Backchannel Broadcast, which was released in February, 2001. The album included the song "Wait It Out", written by Ben Weasel and later re-recorded by The Riverdales for their record Phase Three.

John Jughead (of Screeching Weasel and Even in Blackouts) filled in as second guitar on many tour stops on the Death by Television and Backchannel tours. Other notable appearances on these tours include Ben Weasel (at The Fireside in Chicago, his first stage appearance since 1995), and Lurch Nobody. Timmy V left the band after Death by Television and was replaced by Austin, Texas drummer Scott Holubec. The band played a one-off show with Even in Blackouts in March 2003. In May 2003, drummer Scott Holubec left the band, and was replaced by Brandon Carlisle of Teenage Bottlerocket. In August, the band announced they would be breaking up.

Red Scare Industries reissued Death by Television and Backchannel Broadcast in 2005. The band split for a few years before reuniting with all original members to release a new album, The Too Late Show in 2006 with no plans on reuniting for a tour to support due to the members' other commitments.

Templeman is currently a member of Laramie, Wyoming Punk rock band Teenage Bottlerocket. Drummer Timmy V was the touring drummer with Albuquerque, New Mexico all girl three-piece The Eyeliners, and plays drums in his own project Stabbed in Back, a punk rock band that is influenced by early DC bands.

The band reformed in 2013 to play Riot Fest, and played a few shows in the Northeast in 2014. In November 2015, the group supported The Queers for a couple of shows. In early January 2017, it was announced that the band was in the studio recording a new album. On April 13, it was announced that an EP, titled Project 313, would be released via Red Scare Industries on June 9. On June 20, 2017 the band announced that they had signed to Fat Wreck Chords. The label subsequently released their album Stella Sapiente that October.

== Discography ==
=== Studio albums ===
- Shit Out of Luck (1996)
- Idiot Word Search (split with Nothing Cool) (1997)
- Death by Television (1999)
- The Backchannel Broadcast (2001)
- The Too Late Show (2006)
- Stella Sapiente (2017)

=== EPs ===
- I Lost My Marbles (1996)
- Lillington High (1996)
- Project 313 (2017)
- Can Anybody Hear Me? (A Tribute To Enemy You) (2021)

=== Compilations ===
- Technically Unsound (2005, box set)

=== Compilation appearances ===
- Joe King Presents: More Bounce To The Ounce (1997)
- I Can't Believe It's Not Water (1997)
- Lookout! Freakout (2000)
- Lookout! Freakout Episode 2 (2001)
- AMP Magazine Presents, Vol. 4: Punk Pop (2005)
- Punk Rock Generation, Vol. 2 (2007)
- Plea for Peace, Volume 2 (2007)
- Red Scare Industries: 10 Years Of Your Dumb Bullshit (2014)
