= Television City Dream =

Studio album by Screeching Weasel
- Released: August 25, 1998; November 9, 2010
- Recorded: January–February, 1998 at Sonic Iguana Studios, Lafayette, IN and Uberstudio, Chicago, IL
- Genre: Punk rock
- Length: 27:27
- Label: Fat Wreck Chords
- Producer: Mass Giorgini, Ben Weasel

Screeching Weasel chronology
Bark Like a Dog (1996)	Television City Dream (1998)	Emo (1999)

Alternative covers
- 2010 re-release

Professional ratings
Review scores
Source	Rating
Allmusic	2.5/5 stars

Television City Dream is the ninth studio album by the American punk rock band Screeching Weasel. It was released in 1998 through Fat Wreck Chords. It was the band's last album released through Fat Wreck Chords until First World Manifesto in 2011. The album is the first to feature new members Mass Giorgini, Zac Damon, and Dan Lumley. The cover art was done by Giorgini's father, noted artist Aldo Giorgini. The songs on the album are notably faster than previous Screeching Weasel albums. The album was re-released on November 9, 2010, featuring five bonus tracks from the original recording sessions.

The title of the album comes from the song "The Prisoner" by D.O.A., which was covered by Weasel during the album's sessions and released on the compilation Thank You Very Little.

== Track listing ==
All songs written by Ben Weasel.

1. "Count to Three" - 1:34
2. "Speed of Mutation" - 2:39
3. "Dummy Up" - 1:42
4. "Your Morality" - 1:52
5. "Dirty Needles" - 0:27
6. "Breaking Point" - 2:00
7. "Outside of You" - 2:50
8. "We Are the Generation X" - 1:34
9. "Identity Crisis" - 1:40
10. "The First Day of Winter" - 2:46
11. "Plastic Bag" - 0:59
12. "I Don't Give a Fuck" - 0:52
13. "Only a Test" - 0:37
14. "Pervert at Large" (The Vindictives cover) - 3:23
15. "Burn It Down" - 2:32

=== 2010 re-release ===
1. "Count to Three"
2. "Speed of Mutation"
3. "Dummy Up"
4. "Video" *
5. "Your Morality"
6. "Dirty Needles"
7. "Punk Rock Explained" *
8. "Breaking Point"
9. "My Own World" *
10. "Outside of You"
11. "We Are the Generation X"
12. "Identity Crisis"
13. "The First Day of Winter"
14. "Crybaby" *
15. "Shut the Hell Up" *
16. "Plastic Bag"
17. "I Don't Give a Fuck"
18. "Only a Test"
19. "Pervert at Large" (The Vindictives cover)
20. "Burn It Down"

== Personnel ==
- Ben Weasel - lead vocals
- Zac Damon - lead guitar, backing vocals
- John Jughead - rhythm guitar
- Mass Giorgini - bass
- Dan Lumley - drums
