= How to Make Enemies and Irritate People =

- Original Lookout cover

Studio album by Screeching Weasel
- Released: September 23, 1994
- Recorded: June 1994
- Studio: Dan Panic's basement in Chicago
- Genre: Punk rock
- Length: 27:56
- Label: Lookout, Asian Man, Recess
- Producer: Mass Giorgini and Ben Weasel

Screeching Weasel chronology
Anthem for a New Tomorrow (1993)	How to Make Enemies and Irritate People (1994)	Kill the Musicians (1995)

Professional ratings
Review scores
Source	Rating
Allmusic	3/5 stars
Punk Planet	Favorable

How to Make Enemies and Irritate People is the seventh studio album by the Chicago-based punk rock band Screeching Weasel. Planned as the group's final album, it was released in September 1994 on CD, vinyl, and cassette through Lookout Records. Shortly before recording the album, bassist/backing vocalist Dan Vapid left the band and, as a result, Green Day bassist Mike Dirnt was recruited to play on the album.

Screeching Weasel broke up the day recording finished and shut down their post office box soon after. During the break-up, vocalist Ben Weasel, Vapid and drummer Dan Panic went on to form the more Ramones-influenced band the Riverdales while guitarist John Jughead took time off from music to write and direct plays. The band would reunite in 1996 with Vapid back on bass for the Bark Like a Dog album on Fat Wreck Chords.

After the band removed its catalog from Lookout due to unpaid royalties, the album was re-released by Asian Man Records in 2005 and was again reissued on vinyl in 2013 by Recess Records featuring new artwork. The new artwork, illustrated by Riccardo Bucchioni, depicts the Screeching Weasel mascot punching a tree as numerous figures wielding flaming torches approach from the shadows - a visual allusion to the aftermath of the infamous 2011 SXSW incident in which Ben Weasel was involved in an onstage physical altercation.

== Background ==
Shortly after the release of their sixth studio album Anthem for a New Tomorrow in 1993, the group embarked on what would be its final tour until 2000. The group played the final show of the tour on November 2, 1993, and decided to break up one year from that date. However, bassist Dan Vapid left the band in Spring 1994. Although they knew Screeching Weasel was "pretty much over", the other members of the band wanted to record one more album of songs they had been working on since the release of Anthem for a New Tomorrow. As a replacement for Vapid, the group recruited Mike Dirnt, bassist for the Berkeley, California-based punk rock band Green Day, to play bass on the album. Dirnt was "short on time", however, as Green Day had just released their album Dookie at the time and were experiencing mainstream success.

== Recording ==
The album was recorded 6 days from June 14 to 16, then from June 22 to 24, in drummer Dan Panic's basement at his house in Chicago. Vocalist Ben Weasel and frequent collaborator Mass Giorgini served as producers, with Giorgini bringing the recording board from his own Sonic Iguana Studio to Panic's house to record. At one point during the sessions, Dirnt had to leave and fly to New York City to play live with Green Day on the Late Show with David Letterman. Due to his absence, Giorgini played bass on the song "Waiting for Susie", the b-side to the non-album single "Suzanne Is Getting Married" that the band was also recording at the time. Giorgini also played bass on the album outtake "Nightbreed" (a song written in 1990 for Weasel and guitarist John Jughead's band The Gore Gore Girls). Although Dirnt had recorded bass for the song, the group realized that his bass part was "stepping all over the lead vocal" in the chorus, so they removed it and had Giorgini re-record it. This recording of "Nightbreed" would not be released until it appeared on the rarities compilation Thank You Very Little in 2000. After recording, the album was mixed by Giorgini in Weasel's bedroom at his house in Chicago in July 1994, by which time the band had already broken up.

== Track listing ==
All tracks are written by Ben Weasel, except where noted.

Side one
No.	Title	Fake title	Length
1.	"Planet of the Apes"	Planet of the Dupes	1:50
2.	"99"	86	2:17
3.	"I Hate Your Guts on Sunday"	I Love Yer Nuts on Monday	1:39
4.	"Johnny Are You Queer?" (written by Bobby and Larson Paine; originally performed by Josie Cotton)	Johnny Is That Beer?	2:07
5.	"Time Bomb"	Slime Pond	1:15
6.	"Burnout Girl"	Burnt Out Squirrel	2:20
7.	"If I Was You"	If I Was Hugh	2:04

Side two
No.	Title	Fake title	Length
8.	"Nobody Likes You" (written by Weasel and Dan Vapid)	Nobody Bites You	2:05
9.	"Degenerate"	Da Genitals	2:03
10.	"Surf Goddess" (written by Weasel and Joe King)	Smurf Goddess	3:25
11.	"Kathy Isn't Right"	Kathy's Not Too Light	1:25
12.	"Kathy's on the Roof"	Kathy's on the Moon	2:39
13.	"I Wrote Holden Caulfield"	I Wrote Ignatius J. Reilly	2:47
Total length:			27:56

- Original Lookout copies of the album included a humorously erroneous track listing on the back cover.

== Personnel ==
- Ben Weasel – lead vocals, guitar
- John Jughead – guitar
- Mike Dirnt – bass, backing vocals
- Dan Panic – drums

Additional performers

- Gretchen Smear – backing vocals on "Johnny Are You Queer?"

Production

- Mass Giorgini – producer, engineer, mixer
- Ben Weasel – producer, mixer
- Chris Appelgren – cover art
- Anna Mullen – photography
- Richard Bucchioni – cover art and layout for 2013 reissue
