= Riverdales (album) =

Studio album by Riverdales
- Released: June 7, 1995; October 10, 2006
- Recorded: January 1995
- Studios: Sonic Iguana, Lafayette, Indiana
- Genres: Punk rock, pop punk
- Length: 30:23; 58:26 (reissue)
- Labels: Lookout (LK 120); Asian Man (AMR 138)
- Producer: Mass Giorgini

Riverdales chronology
Riverdales (1995)	Storm the Streets (1997)

2006 Reissue Cover

Singles from Riverdales
- 1. "Fun Tonight" Released: June 1995; 2. "Back to You" Released: July 1995

Riverdales is the eponymously titled debut studio album by the Chicago-based punk rock band the Riverdales. Formed after the break-up of Screeching Weasel, the band sought to write more Ramones-inspired music and the album was released on June 7, 1995, through Lookout Records with the catalog number LK 120. The group supported the album by opening for Green Day on the initial US leg of the tour for their album Insomniac. Riverdales experienced substantial success on the tour, and the album became the group's best-selling release to date.

Shortly after the original release of Riverdales, Foster got into a dispute with Lookout Records owner Larry Livermore and the Riverdales left the label and signed to Fat Mike's Honest Don's Records for their next album Storm the Streets (1997). Despite this, Riverdales remained in print on Lookout until 2005, when the group removed their catalog from the label, alongside many other artists. The album was re-released on October 10, 2006, by Asian Man Records with new cover art and 12 bonus tracks.

== Background and recording ==
Shortly after the recording of Screeching Weasel's seventh studio album How to Make Enemies and Irritate People in June 1994, the group decided to break up and close down their post office box. During this time, guitarist John Jughead focused on writing and directing plays, while vocalist Ben Weasel, bassist Dan Vapid and drummer Dan Panic decided to form a more Ramones-influenced band. They named the band the Riverdales, after the fictional town in the Archie comics, and decided to perform under their birth names as opposed to the theme of using pseudonyms in Screeching Weasel.

Riverdales was recorded in January 1995 at Sonic Iguana Studios in Lafayette, Indiana, with producer and engineer Mass Giorgini. Foster later called Billie Joe Armstrong, vocalist-guitarist for the punk rock band Green Day, in February and asked him to mix the album. Although willing to do the job, Armstrong could not go to Indiana because his wife Adrienne was about to give birth to their son Joey. Schafer decided to travel to Berkeley, California, and Armstrong mixed the album at The Catbox Studios. The album was mastered by Stephen Marcussen in April 1995 at Precision Mastering in Hollywood, California.

== Release and reception ==
Professional ratings
Review scores
Source	Rating
AllMusic	2/5 stars

The album was released on June 7, 1995, through Lookout Records with the catalog number LK 120. It received mostly positive reviews from Screeching Weasel's fanbase and other punk rock fans. Foster stated that the band was "really happy with it" and that he thought the album "turned out great", saying that it had "nice, loud guitar". However, he would later admit that it was "inferior" to their next album Storm the Streets. The success of the Riverdales on their tour with Green Day resulted in the album becoming the group's best-selling release.

Despite positive reception, critic Mike DaRonco of AllMusic gave Riverdales a mostly negative review, rating the album 2 out of 5 stars and calling the record "boring". DaRonco stated that the structures were "so simple that a three-year-old could learn them in a day" and that "one is better off just buying any other Screeching Weasel record." However, he praised the tracks "Back to You" and "I Think About You During the Commercials" as "catchy standouts".

== Tour ==
Riverdales promoted the album by opening for Green Day on the tour in support of their fourth studio album Insomniac, which began on August 27, 1995, at the Lowlands Festival in the Netherlands and ended on December 16, 1995, at the Memorial Coliseum in Portland, Oregon. The group initially supported The Mr. T Experience at a few shows in June and July. Riverdales achieved substantial success on the tour, resulting in the album becoming the band's best-selling release to date. According to Foster, the band achieved huge success in South Florida and got "booed a couple times" in cities such as Philadelphia. After the performance in Portland, Green Day continued the tour in Japan with The Mr. T Experience supporting for the remaining concerts. Green Day later canceled much of the European leg of the tour after a performance in Germany on March 27, 1996. Foster later admitted that doing the tour "destroyed the band" and "killed any semblance of friendship between the three [band members]", resulting in the band's break-up in 1997.

== Re-releases ==
On October 10, 2006, Asian Man Records—who had re-issued most of Screeching Weasel's material—re-released Riverdales with new cover art and an additional 12 tracks. The bonus tracks include the previously unreleased album outtakes "Two-Headed Girl" and "I Won't Forget You", the b-sides "I'm a Vegetable" (from the "Fun Tonight" single) and "No Sense" (from the "Blood on the Ice" single), and 8 live tracks recorded at the Lowlands Festival in the Netherlands on August 27, 1995, opening for Green Day. Riverdales' new cover art featured a grainy photograph of the Chicago skyline.

Since 2010, it has been rumored that the album will be re-released by either Recess Records or Fat Wreck Chords. However, no further information has been provided.

== Track listing ==
All tracks are written by Ben Foster and Dan Schafer.

This Side
No.	Title	Length
1.	"Fun Tonight"	2:52
2.	"Judy Go Home"	1:55
3.	"Wanna Be Alright"	1:54
4.	"Back to You"	3:33
5.	"Not Over Me"	2:19
6.	"She's Gonna Break Your Heart"	1:26

That Other Side
No.	Title	Length
7.	"I Think About You During the Commercials"	3:52
8.	"Rehabilitated"	2:26
9.	"Plan 13"	1:59
10.	"Outta Sight"	1:07
11.	"In Your Dreams"	4:22
12.	"Hampton Beach"	2:31
Total length:		30:23

Asian Man reissue bonus tracks (2006)
No.	Title	Length
13.	"I'm a Vegetable"	2:05
14.	"Two-Headed Girl"	3:16
15.	"I Won't Forget You"	3:10
16.	"No Sense"	1:40
17.	"She's Gonna Break Your Heart" (live)	1:21
18.	"I Think About You During the Commercials" (live)	3:34
19.	"Judy Go Home" (live)	1:41
20.	"Wanna Be Alright" (live)	1:42
21.	"Back to You" (live)	2:43
22.	"Rehabilitated" (live)	2:01
23.	"Give It Up" (live)	2:33
24.	"Hampton Beach" (live)	2:25
Total length:		58:26

== Personnel ==
Riverdales

- Dan Schafer – bass, lead vocals
- Ben Foster – guitar, lead vocals
- Dan Sullivan – drums, backing vocals

Additional performers

- Rev. Nørb – guest vocals on "Fun Tonight"

Production

- Mass Giorgini – producer, engineer
- Billie Joe Armstrong – mixer
- Stephen Marcussen – mastering
- Anna Mullen – photography
