= Teen Punks in Heat =

Studio album by Screeching Weasel
- Released: September 12, 2000
- Recorded: May 1–5, 2000 at Acme Recording Studio, Chicago, IL and Sonic Iguana Studios, Lafayette, IN
- Genre: Punk rock, pop punk
- Length: 36:16
- Label: Panic Button
- Producer: Mass Giorgini, Ben Weasel

Screeching Weasel chronology
Emo (1999)	Teen Punks in Heat (2000)	Weasel Mania (2005)

Professional ratings
Review scores
Source	Rating
Allmusic	1.5/5 stars

Teen Punks in Heat is the eleventh studio album by the American punk rock band Screeching Weasel. It was released in September 2000 through Panic Button Records. Though receiving mixed reviews from national critics, it was championed upon its release by many critics in the band's Chicago hometown.Shortly after the release of the album, the band played two sold-out shows at Chicago's House of Blues, their first live performances in seven years. Rumors of a full tour to promote the album swirled, but the band announced their break-up before any plans were confirmed.

The album features a cover of Italian pop punk band The Manges' "I Will Always Do."

== Track listing ==
All songs written by Ben Weasel, except where noted.

1. "Bottom of the 9th" - 0:54
2. "Gotta Girlfriend" - 1:33
3. "Too Worked Up" - 1:54
4. "I'll Stop the Rain" - 2:45
5. "I Love You" - 1:10
6. "Molecule" - 1:28
7. "21 Months" - 1:38
8. "The First Day of Autumn" - 1:38
9. "Erection" - 1:54
10. "I Will Always Do" (The Manges) - 3:09
11. "You're the Enemy" - 0:47
12. "I Wanna Fuck" - 1:02
13. "Cat-Like" - 0:44
14. "Pauline" - 0:58
15. "Things Seem All Fucked Up Today" - 1:20
16. "Message in a Beer Bottle" - 1:30
17. "You're Sorry Now" - 1:26
18. "Don't Want It" - 3:10
19. "Six Percent" - 2:10
20. "The Edge of the World" - 5:06

== Personnel ==
- Ben Weasel - lead vocals
- Phillip Hill - lead guitar, backing vocals
- Jughead - rhythm guitar
- Mass Giorgini - bass, backing vocals
- Dan Lumley - drums
