= Fidatevi =

Studio album by Ben Weasel
- Released: June 18, 2002
- Genre: Punk rock
- Label: Panic Button Records
- Producer: Mass Giorgini

Ben Weasel chronology
Fidatevi (2002)	These Ones Are Bitter (2007)

Professional ratings
Review scores
Source	Rating
Allmusic	2.5/5 stars

Fidatevi is the first solo album released by American punk rock band Screeching Weasel frontman Ben Weasel. The album was released on June 18, 2002 on Panic Button Records.

Weasel has said that the lyrics on the album "Are based on experiences or insights gained by practicing secular sitting meditation, as well as ideas I came across and personalized through the study of the works of authors as diverse as Geshe Kelsang Gyatso, Henry David Thoreau, Jon Kabat-Zinn, Pema Chodron, Ralph Waldo Emerson and others."

== Track listing ==
All songs written by Ben Weasel except where noted.

1. "Patience"
2. "The True Heart of Love"
3. "Fidatevi"
4. "Even Pace"
5. "The Ship"
6. "Strangers" (Dave Davies)
7. "Truth and Beauty"
8. "Indecision"
9. "No Expectations"
10. "Imperfect World" (Ben Weasel, Dan Vapid)
11. "Responsibility"
12. "Take Action"
13. "Water and Waves"
14. "The Rays of the Sun"

== Personnel ==
- Ben Weasel- vocals
- Dan Vapid- guitar, bass, backing vocals
- Mass Giorgini- production, engineering, mastering
- Phillip Hill- assistant engineering, lead guitar on "Take Action"
- Devin Davis- keyboards on "Strangers" and "The Rays Of The Sun"
