= Anthem for a New Tomorrow =

Studio album by Screeching Weasel
- Released: October 8, 1993
- Recorded: February (tracks 9 and 10) and May 11–12, 1993 at Sonic Iguana, Lafayette, IN
- Genres: Punk rock, pop punk
- Length: 33:38
- Labels: Lookout!, Asian Man
- Producers: Andy Ernst, Mass Giorgini, Ben Weasel

Screeching Weasel chronology
Wiggle (1993)	Anthem for a New Tomorrow (1993)	How to Make Enemies and Irritate People (1994)

Anthem for a New Tomorrow is the sixth studio album by the American punk rock band Screeching Weasel. It was released in 1993 through Lookout! Records. According to Contemporary Musician, Anthem for a New Tomorrow is "widely regarded as one of the band's best efforts".

== Album trivia ==
Anthem for a New Tomorrow was recorded after the Screeching Weasel returned from their 1993 U.S. tour, which was their last. The liner notes of the album read "Hey! You've heard them, now go SEE them!" The title is taken from the song "Second Floor East" from their previous album, Wiggle. Mass Giorgini recorded the album at his Sonic Iguana Studio. All songs on the album were taken from this session except "Every Night" and "Totally", which the band felt were better represented by demo recordings they'd done months earlier at Flat Iron Studios with Andy Ernst. The two songs were also recorded during the sessions at Sonic Iguana and released on the compilation Thank You Very Little and included as bonus tracks on the remixed and remastered 30th anniversary edition along with alternate vocal takes of "Panic" and "Thrift Store Girl".

After their last album, the band lost bassist Johnny Personality. Rather than find a replacement, guitarist Danny Vapid switched to bass and Ben Weasel took over second guitar. This later came to be known as the band's "classic" lineup. In contrast with the albums and EPs that preceded Anthem for a New Tomorrow, the vast majority of the writing was done by Ben Weasel alone. Only one song, "Trance," out of 18 was co-written with bassist Danny Vapid. Vapid later remarked that "to suggest anything else would've ruined the mix." The album has been described by the band as a concept album, dealing with issues of alienation, paranoia, and isolation in modern society. In the liner notes of the Asian Man released version of the album, Weasel and Vapid both say the sound of the album was heavily influenced by Wire's Pink Flag. Weasel has said that he wanted the album to sound "like a panic attack."

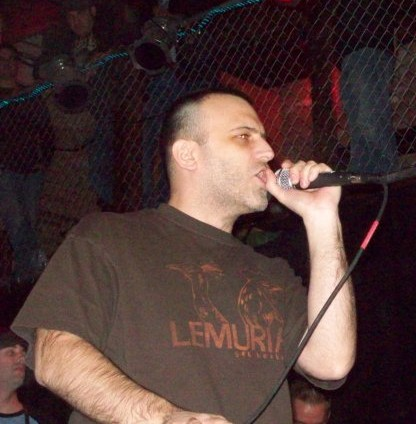
Ben Weasel with Screeching Weasel at Reggie's Rock Club, Chicago in February 2010

The album was remastered and re-released by Asian Man Records in 2005.

== Reception and influence ==
Professional ratings
Review scores
Source	Rating
AllMusic	4/5 stars

In 2022, Dustin Kensrue of the modern rock band Thrice listed Anthem for a New Tomorrow as one of the top albums which influenced him as a musician. Kensrue describes the album as having "a lighthearted, weird playfulness at times...very serious political ramifications sometimes, and...just a sort of honesty and raw quality" that makes it distinctive from other music. Bass guitarist Mark Rubano of Taking Back Sunday also named Anthem for a New Tomorrow as one of the top two albums he listened to as a teen.

== Track listing ==
All tracks are written by Ben Weasel, except where noted.

No.	Title	Length
1.	"I'm Gonna Strangle You"	1:04
2.	"Falling Apart"	2:00
3.	"Leather Jacket"	1:05
4.	"Rubber Room"	0:30
5.	"Talk to Me Summer"	1:55
6.	"Inside Out"	2:04
7.	"Peter Brady"	2:10
8.	"I, Robot"	2:50
9.	"Every Night"	3:45
10.	"Totally"	1:44
11.	"Three Sides"	0:45
12.	"I Don't Wanna Be Friends"	1:55
13.	"Cancer in My Body"	0:53
14.	"Thrift Store Girl"	1:09
15.	"Panic"	0:12
16.	"Trance" (Ben Weasel/Dan Vapid)	2:17
17.	"Claire Monet"	3:39
18.	"A New Tomorrow"	3:41

== Personnel ==
Screeching Weasel

- Ben Weasel - lead vocals, guitar
- Jughead - guitar
- Danny Vapid - bass, backing vocals
- Danny Panic - drums

Additional performers

- Blake Schwarzenbach - vocals on "A New Tomorrow"
- Cassandra Millspaugh - vocals on "A New Tomorrow"
- Joey Vindictive - vocals on "A New Tomorrow"
- Fat Mike - backing vocals on "Peter Brady"
