= Fun Tonight =

Fun Tonight may refer to:

- "Fun Tonight", a song by Lady Gaga from the album Chromatica
- "Fun Tonight", a song by the Riverdales from the album Riverdales
