= Shenanigans (EP) =

EP by Squirtgun
- Released: June 9, 1995
- Recorded: 1995
- Genre: Punk rock, pop punk
- Length: 10:30
- Language: English
- Label: Lookout!
- Producer: Mass Giorgini

Squirtgun chronology
Shenanigans (1995)	Squirtgun (1995)

Shenanigans is the debut extended play by the American punk rock band Squirtgun. It was released on June 9, 1995, through Lookout! Records. Shenanigans features slightly different versions of the songs "Social" and "Frederick's Frost", which later appeared on the group's debut studio album, Squirtgun. The version of "Social" on Shenanigans was used in the opening credits of the Kevin Smith film Mallrats in 1995.

== Track listing ==
1. "Social" – 3:35
2. "Frederick's Frost" – 1:35
3. "Giddy and Glum" – 2:37
4. "Almost the Girl" – 2:44

== Personnel ==
- Mass Giorgini – bass, producer
- Flav Giorgini – guitar
- Matt Hart – guitar, vocals
- Dan Lumley – drums
