= Invasion U.S.A. (album) =

Invasion USA

Studio album by The Riverdales
- Released: July 14, 2009
- Recorded: February – April 2009
- Genre: Punk rock, pop punk
- Length: 28:14
- Label: Asian Man
- Producer: Justin Perkins

The Riverdales chronology
Phase Three (2003)	Invasion USA (2009)	Tarantula (2010)

Invasion USA is the fourth studio album by the American punk rock band the Riverdales. It was the first Riverdales album in six years. The album's song titles are almost exclusively taken from titles of old sci-fi and horror movies of the 1950s and 1960s, particularly of those featured on the popular television program, Mystery Science Theater 3000. The lyrics to Gemini Man were printed on the back of the vinyl and is the second time the Riverdales released any lyrics to the public. The album marked the return of the band and led to their fifth and final studio album, Tarantula which Ben Weasel said should have been a second part of Invasion U.S.A.

== Track listing ==
1. "Agent For H.A.R.M." - 1:35
2. "Gemini Man" - 2:19
3. "Heart Out of Season" - 1:56
4. "Red Zone Cuba" - 1:50
5. "Squirm" - 1:27
6. "Prince Of Space" - 2:08
7. "Rocketship X-M" - 2:55
8. "King Dinosaur" - 2:22
9. "Castle Of Fu Manchu" - 1:56
10. "Time Of The Apes" - 2:19
11. "Atomic Brain" - 1:26
12. "Crawling Eye" - 2:05
13. "Teenage Strangler" - 1:54
14. "Werewolf One" - 2:02

== Personnel ==
- Ben Foster - guitar, lead vocals
- Dan Schafer - bass, lead vocals
- Adam Cargin - drums
