= Aldo Giorgini =

Italian artist

- Born: 15 March 1934; Voghera, province of Pavia
- Died: 16 October 1994 (aged 60); Indianapolis, Indiana, U.S.
- Occupation: Artist

Aldo Giorgini (March 15, 1934 – October 1994) was an Italian artist and a pioneer in computer graphics. He was the father of music producer Mass Giorgini and Flav Giorgini.

== Biography ==
Giorgini was born in Voghera, in the province of Pavia (northern Italy). He was a high school classmate of fashion designer Valentino, who was also a student of design of Ernestina Salvadeo, Giorgini's maternal aunt.

Formally trained by Italian futurist painter-sculptor Ambrogio Casati, Giorgini stayed on with his mentor as an apprentice, and assisted in the restoration of classic works by old masters damaged during the Second World War. Simultaneously attending university coursework outside of his work in the arts, Giorgini earned a doctorate in Mechanical Engineering from Politecnico di Torino before travelling to the United States on a Fulbright Scholarship. There, Giorgini earned a second doctorate, this time a Ph.D. in Civil Engineering from Colorado State University, and accepted a professorial position in the School of Civil Engineering at Purdue University in West Lafayette, Indiana. He moved to Lafayette, Indiana, on 22 December 1968.

At Purdue University, he won several awards and distinctions as an outstanding teacher of fluid mechanics and engineering mathematics at the graduate and undergraduate levels. He regularly included aesthetics lectures in his engineering courses, saying that "to be technical and scientific does not preclude a concern for the beauty and art of image and form. Architecture and engineering both occupy the same continuum: mathematics can be beautiful, and shapes can be useful."

Once established in this new position, Giorgini resumed his artistic work, combining his technical expertise with computers from his engineering training with his background in the visual arts, thereby becoming one of the first computer artists.

His pioneering computer art was generated on the Purdue University mainframe computer (CDC) and printed onto large Mylar sheets using Calcomp printers. Giorgini would then hand-ink the works of art to complete the works he called examples of "computer-aided art".

A childhood prisoner of war in Eritrea himself during World War II, Giorgini often imbued his works with anti-war themes, frequently combining these with critiques of the use of technology for mass destruction. A number of his works are in the permanent collections of the Smithsonian Institution and the Carnegie-Mellon Art Museum.

Aldo Giorgini died in Indianapolis on October 16, 1994, of brain cancer.
