= Four on the Floor (compilation album) =

Compilation album (compilation album) by Various Artists
- Released: January 12, 1999
- Genre: Punk rock
- Label: Panic Button Records

Four on the Floor is a 1999 compilation album consisting of songs by bands on Panic Button Records. It features four tracks by four of the label's bands, Screeching Weasel, Moral Crux, Enemy You, and The Teen Idols.

== Track listing ==
1. "Shut The Hell Up"- Screeching Weasel
2. "Punk Rock Explained" - Screeching Weasel
3. "Video" - Screeching Weasel
4. "Crybaby" - Screeching Weasel
5. "Firing Squad" - Moral Crux
6. "Some Say" - Moral Crux
7. "Internet Loser" - Moral Crux
8. "Assassination Politics" - Moral Crux
9. "Boy In A Bubble" - Enemy You
10. "The Screw" - Enemy You
11. "For You" - Enemy You
12. "Hold On" - Enemy You
13. "Monsters Walk The Earth" - The Teen Idols
14. "Go Away" - The Teen Idols
15. "Just Friends" - The Teen Idols
16. "Outta Style" - The Teen Idols
