= Ambrogio Casati =

Italian painter (1897–1977)

Ambrogio Casati (December 27, 1897 – July 19, 1977) was an Italian painter.

He was born in Voghera, Italy in 1897 and was schooled in Paris in the plastic arts. Upon his return to Italy, he became associated with Filippo Tommaso Marinetti and the Futurist movement that was gaining force in the Italian arts scene of the time. His best-known pieces include The Dance of the Chairs (1931) and Portrait of Marinetti (1927). Casati was also the mentor of the future computer art pioneer Aldo Giorgini.

Casati died in Pavia in 1977.
