= Tarantula (Riverdales album) =

Studio album by The Riverdales
- Released: June 8, 2010 (digital); June 22, 2010 (physical)
- Recorded: December 2009 – January 2010
- Genre: Punk rock
- Length: 29:40
- Label: Recess
- Producer: Justin Perkins

The Riverdales chronology
Invasion USA (2009)	Tarantula (2010)

Tarantula is the fifth and final studio album by the American punk rock band the Riverdales. It was released digitally on June 8, 2010 and was released on CD and vinyl on June 22, 2010 through Recess Records. It was the only Riverdales album to be released through Recess Records, as well as their only album featuring second guitarist Simon Lamb. Ben Weasel has stated that "If [he] had it [his] way, Tarantula would have been part two of a double album with Invasion USA." Tarantula is said to sound more "hardcore" due to the use of two guitars and features hard rock-styled guitar solos. After the album was recorded, Lamb left the band and was replaced by Drew Fredrichsen.

== Track listing ==
1. "Bad Seed Baby" - 1:46
2. "The Beginning of the End" - 1:40
3. "Infection" - 1:39
4. "Diabolik" - 1:31
5. "Volcano" - 1:58
6. "The Girl in Lover's Lane" - 1:40
7. "Girls Town" - 2:06
8. "Soultaker" - 2:22
9. "12 to the Moon" - 1:46
10. "Crash of the Moons" - 3:15
11. "Stranded in Space" - 2:18
12. "I Don't Wanna Live Forever" - 1:43
13. "Master Ninja" - 2:35
14. "Time Chaser" - 3:21

== Personnel ==
- Ben Foster - guitar, lead vocals
- Dan Schafer - bass, lead vocals
- Simon Lamb - guitar, backing vocals
- Adam Cargin - drums
- Drew Fredrichsen - lead guitar on track 3
- Justin Perkins - co-producer, engineer, mixing, mastering, additional guitar, vocals, keyboard, percussion
