= Career Objective =

Studio album by The Methadones
- Released: 2003
- Genre: Punk rock, pop punk
- Length: 34:03
- Label: Stardumb Records
- Producer: Mass Giorgini and The Methadones

Professional ratings
Review scores
Source	Rating
Punknews.org	3.5/5 stars

Career Objective is the second album by punk rock band The Methadones. It was released in 2003.

== Reception ==
In 2003, Aubin Paul, writing for Punknews.org said "'Career Objective' is a testament to the fact that punk is neither dead, nor does it suck," also noting the album demonstrated how punk had changed from prior eras.

Later the same year, Shawn Merril of Exclaim! wrote, "Career Objective ... displays a natural progression into a more established and stronger songwriting foundation, without tarnishing their inherent juvenile behaviour."

Stewart Mason of AllMusic wrote "Career Objective is the sort of record that a 14-year-old kid and his 30-something uncle could both rock out to without complaint." Mason highlights aspects of multiple songs including the "musical sophistication" of "You Don't Know Me Anymore".

== Track listing ==
1. "Premature Mid-Life Crisis" – 2:17
2. "I'm About to Crack" – 2:54
3. "Say Goodbye to Your Generation" – 2:28
4. "Are You Really for Real?" – 2:44
5. "Ammunition" – 3:27
6. "Far Away" – 4:35
7. "Stuck in My Head" – 1:51
8. "Revitalized" – 2:51
9. "Antidote" – 3:15
10. "TV World" – 3:37
11. "You Don't Know Me Anymore" – 4:48
12. "Noodle" – 6:52

== Personnel ==
- Dan Vapid – vocals, guitar
- Mike Byrne – guitar
- Pete Mittler – bass
- Matt Drastic – drums
- Mass Giorgini – production, engineering
- Don Switchblade – engineering
- Phillip Hill – engineering
