= Another Sunny Afternoon =

Studio album by Squirtgun
- Released: 1997
- Recorded: 1997
- Genre: Punk rock, pop punk
- Length: 23:52
- Label: Lookout!
- Producer: Mass Giorgini

Another Sunny Afternoon is the second studio album by the American punk rock band Squirtgun. It was released in 1997 through Lookout! Records. It was their last album to feature Dan Lumley on drums until he rejoined in 2008. It was also their last release on Lookout!.

== Reception ==
Writing for AV Club, J. Garden cites the ode to the Gilligan's Island character "Mary Ann" as a stand-out track, but found the project overall to be disappointing and forgettable when compared to the successes that have come out of founder Mass Giorgini's label. The record reached top 75 most played albums on CMJ alternative radio charts.

== Track listing ==
All songs written by Squirtgun.

1. "Field Trip" - 1:54
2. "Mary Ann" - 2:36
3. "Hey Louise" - 2:14
4. "Another Sunny Afternoon" - 1:53
5. "Butterbean" - 2:06
6. "So Cool" - 1:57
7. "Coffee" - 1:34
8. "My Jeannette" - 1:50
9. "Come On, Let's Go" - 1:49
10. "Normal Girl" - 1:35
11. "Without a Ticket" - 1:06
12. "You're the Greatest" - 3:20

== Personnel ==
- Mass Giorgini - bass, vocals, producer
- Flav Giorgini - vocals, guitar
- Matt Leonard - vocals, guitar
- Matt Hart - guitar
- Dan Lumley - drums
