= First World Manifesto =

Studio album by Screeching Weasel
- Released: March 15, 2011
- Recorded: November–December 2010 at Mystery Room Mastering & Recording Co, Milwaukee, WI, and Blast House Studios, Madison, WI
- Genre: Punk rock
- Length: 31:05
- Label: Fat Wreck Chords
- Producer: Mike Kennerty

Screeching Weasel chronology
Weasel Mania (2005)	First World Manifesto (2011)	Baby Fat: Act I (2015)

Professional ratings
Review scores
Source	Rating
AllMusic	2.5/5 stars

First World Manifesto is the twelfth full-length studio album by the American punk rock band Screeching Weasel. It was released on March 15, 2011, on Fat Wreck Chords and is the band's first album in eleven years. It was produced by Mike Kennerty of The All-American Rejects, who has worked with Ben Weasel before on These Ones Are Bitter in 2007.

On February 10, 2011, "Beginningless Vacation" premiered on spin.com as a free download.

== Track listing ==
All songs written by Ben Weasel, except "Dry Is the Desert" written by Ben Weasel & Dan Vapid.

1. "Follow Your Leaders" - 2:06
2. "Frankengirl" - 1:50
3. "Beginningless Vacation" - 2:20
4. "Dry Is the Desert" - 2:44
5. "Totem Pole" - 2:04
6. "Creepy Crawl" - 2:02
7. "Three Lonely Days" - 2:43
8. "Friday Night Nation" - 2:06
9. "All Over Town" - 2:29
10. "Fortune Cookie" - 2:13
11. "Baby Talk" - 2:17
12. "Come and See the Violence Inherent in the System" - 2:02
13. "Bite Marks" - 1:29
14. "Little Big Man" - 2:40

== Personnel ==
Screeching Weasel

- Ben Weasel - lead vocals
- Dan Vapid - guitar, backing vocals
- Drew Fredrichsen - guitar, backing vocals
- Justin Perkins - bass, backing vocals, percussion
- Adam Cargin - drums

Additional performers

- Dr. Frank - additional vocals on "Frankengirl"
- Joe King - additional vocals on "Creepy Crawl"
- Teakettle Jones - keyboards
