= Boris the Sprinkler =

American punk rock band

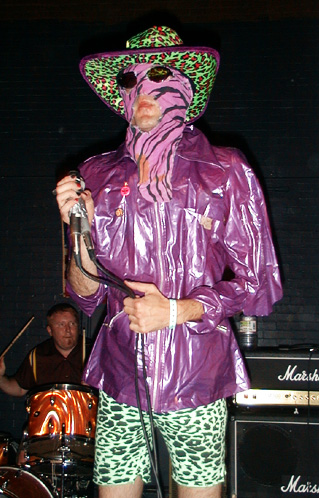
- Rev. Nørb, frontman of Boris the Sprinkler, in 2000

Background information
- Origin: Green Bay, Wisconsin, U.S.
- Genre: Punk rock
- Years active: 1992–2003, 2009–present
- Labels: Bulge; Lookout!; Dirtnap; Mutant Pop; Go-Kart; Beer City Records
- Members: Rev. Norb; Paul No. 1; Paul No. 2; Ric Six
- Past members: Erik No. 1; Ronny Johnny Kispert; Eric No. 2; Tim 00

Boris the Sprinkler is a punk rock band that formed in Green Bay, Wisconsin in 1992. Front man Rev. Nørb has been a regular fanzine columnist over a period of four decades, writing regularly for Maximum RocknRoll, Hit List, and Razorcake, among other national magazines.

== History ==
Boris the Sprinkler was founded in Green Bay in 1992 by Reverend Nørb (vocals) and Paul #1 (guitar). Nørb and Paul (born Paul Schroder) initially played with Eric Lee (bass) and Ronny Johnny Kispert (drums); later members included Eric James (bass), Ric 6 (bass), and Paul 2 (drums). Nørb, who was born Norb Rozek, had previously written for the music magazines Sick Teen and Maximum Rocknroll. Nørb's lyrics and the band's style were self-consciously irreverent, tongue-in-cheek, and referential to other aspects of pop culture, influenced by punk rock groups such as The Dickies, The Rezillos, and The Ramones. The group often dressed in flamboyant styles such as "zebra-print tights and gold lamé body suits".

Boris the Sprinkler released eight full-length albums over the period 1994–2000, including 1994's 8 Testicled Pogo Machine (which included a vocal cameo by Wesley Willis on its first track), 1998's End of the Century (which covered the Ramones album of the same name in its entirety), and two albums for Go-Kart Records, 1999's Suck and 2000's Gay. The group also released numerous EPs and singles, among them 1995's Mutant Pop release "Drugs and Masturbation" and 1996's "Kill the Ramones".

In 1996, Reverend Nørb was a guest on an episode of The Jenny Jones Show

In 2013, Nørb published The Annotated Boris: Deconstructing the Lyrical Majesty of Boris the Sprinkler, a "line-by-line analysis" of songs he wrote for Boris the Sprinkler.

The band released a new album, Vespa to Venus, on Beer City Records on September 13, 2019. The release reunited the 1997 Mega Anal lineup of Paul #1, Paul #2, Ric Six, and Reverend Nørb.

2024 saw the release of the 7-song album Boris Gets a Clue.

In 2026, another album, Birthday Spankings, on Hawaiian Express Records was announced & released on October 9th. The album was recorded Live in Green Bay on 8/2/97 which was Rev. Norb’s 32nd birthday. It features 20 tracks.

The band will be performing two shows in Hawaii in early 2027 (with the Mega Anal lineup) on two different islands.

== Discography ==
=== Albums ===
- 8-Testicled Pogo Machine (Bulge Records, 1994)
- Saucer to Saturn (Bulge Records, 1995)
- End of the Century (Clearview Records, 1996)
- Mega Anal (Bulge Records, 1997)
- Suck (Go-Kart Records, 1999)
- Group Sex (Bulge Records, 2000)
- Gay (Go-Kart, 2000)
- Vespa To Venus (Beer City Records, 2019)
- Boris the Sprinkler Gets a Clue (Rum Bar Records, 2024)

=== Live albums ===
- The Frozen Tundra of... Boris the Sprinkler (Bulge Records, 1998)
- Live Cincinnati 1999 (Mutant Pop Records, 2000)
- Birthday Spankings ‘97 ([[Hawaiian Express Records]], 2026)

=== EPs ===
- V.M.Live Presents Boris the Sprinkler 11/1/96 (VML Records)
- Gratuitous 1998 Summer Tour 10" (Clearview Records)
- Banana Pad Riot! / Split with The Vindictives, Young Fresh Fellows & Mr. T Experience (Skullduggery Records)
- 8" flexi-disc with Less Than Jake, Sonic Dolls and Mulligan Stu (Rhetoric Records)

=== Singles ===
- 4Money (split with Quencher) (Lombardi Records)
- She's Got a Lighter / It's My Style (Trouser Cough Records)
- (Do You Wanna) Grilled Cheese? / Bad Guy Reaction (Bulge Records)
- Male Model / Superball Eyes / Ejector Seat (Bulge Records)
- Beth / I Turned Into a Martian (split with The Droids) (Power Ground Records)
- Drugs & Masturbation / Yeah Yeah / Yeah Yeah No (Mutant Pop Records)
- Ready Steady Go (split w/ Scooby Don't) (Just Add Water Records)
- True Grit / Poodle Party / Do the Mimi (split with the Meatmen) (Bulge Records)
- Hey Ed! / Attitude (split w/ Moral Crux) (They Still Make Records)
- Sheena's Got a Microwave / Chipmunks Are Go! / Chemistry Set (split with the Sonic Dolls) (Bulge Records)
- 113th Man / Son of Musical Interlude / Penalty Box / Can't Controllit (SuperSonicRefrigeRecords)
- Kill the Ramones / Kill the Sex Pistols (Junk Records)
- Little Yellow Box / Why Don't We Do It in the Dumpster / Get Off the Phone (Bulge Records)
- New Wave Records / Yellow Pills / Hi, We're the Replacements (Mutant Pop Records)
- Nikki The Sprinkler / Borisites (split with the Parasites) (Just Add Water Records)
- (I've Been Hittin' On A) Russian Robot / Do The Go / Got The Time (Lookout Records)
- Sick Sick Sick / Ultimatum / Busy Signals (split with the Dead Vampires) (Dirtnap Records)

== Members ==
- Rev. Nørb – vocals, keytar, guitar, harmonica
- Paul No. 1 – guitar, vocals
- Erik No. 1 – bass, guitar
- Ronny Johnny Kispert – drums
- Eric No. 2 – bass, vocals, recording engineer
- Paul No. 2 – drums
- Ric Six – bass
- Tim 00 – bass
- LP – guitar
