= Emo (album) =

Studio album by Screeching Weasel
- Released: May 18, 1999
- Recorded: January 5–14, 1999
- Studio: Acme (Chicago)
- Genre: Punk rock
- Length: 38:42
- Label: Panic Button
- Producer: Brendan Burke

Screeching Weasel chronology
Television City Dream (1998)	Emo (1999)	Teen Punks in Heat (2000)

Professional ratings
Review scores
Source	Rating
Allmusic	4/5 stars

Emo is the tenth studio album by the American punk rock band Screeching Weasel. It was released on May 18, 1999, through Ben Weasel's and John Jughead's label Panic Button Records. It was their first full-length album released through Panic Button Records, recorded in Chicago during the blizzard of 1999.

== Track listing ==
All songs written by Ben Weasel, except "Linger" written by Noel Hogan and Dolores O'Riordan.

1. "Acknowledge" - 2:45
2. "Sidewalk Warrior" - 1:45
3. "Static" - 2:18
4. "The Scene" - 2:44
5. "Let Go" - 4:08
6. "Regroup" - 3:51
7. "Passion" - 2:05
8. "Linger" - 3:45
9. "Last Night" - 3:47
10. "2-7 Split" - 3:35
11. "On My Own" - 2:49
12. "Bark Like a Dog" - 5:07

== Personnel ==
- Ben Weasel - vocals, guitar
- Jughead - guitar
- Mass Giorgini - bass
- Dan Lumley - drums
