= These Ones Are Bitter =

Studio album by Ben Weasel
- Released: June 26, 2007
- Recorded: January–March 2007 at SOMD Studio, Beltsville, MD; Smart Studios, Madison, WI; Chicago, IL
- Genre: Punk rock, Pop punk
- Label: Mendota Recording Company; Edmon Records (EO1); Asian Man Records (AM-175)
- Producer: Mike Kennerty

Ben Weasel chronology
Fidatevi (2002)	These Ones Are Bitter (2007)

Professional ratings
Review scores
Source	Rating
Allmusic	4.5/5 stars

These Ones Are Bitter is the second solo-album by American punk rock band Screeching Weasel front man Ben Weasel. It was released in June 2007, and was the first album released for "Mendota Recording Company", Ben Weasel's digital download only record label. On October 23, 2007, it was released physically on CD and vinyl by Edmond Records, and on April 7, 2009, was re-issued by Asian Man Records.

The original release was credited to "Ben Weasel And His Iron String Quartet", however the Asian Man cover credits the album just to Ben Weasel. Ben Weasel is implied to be a part of the titular Iron String Quartet, as only three other people were featured on the album: Dan Andriano (of Alkaline Trio), Mike Kennerty, and Chris Gaylor (both of the All-American Rejects). Kennerty is also the album's producer.

== Track listing ==
1. "Let Freedom Ring"
2. "In A Few Days"
3. "Got My Number"
4. "Happy Saturday"
5. "Sour All Over"
6. "The First Day of Spring"
7. "Blue Is The Ocean"
8. "Affected By You"
9. "Jeanette"
10. "Addition By Subtraction"
11. "Give It Time"
12. "Summer's Always Gone Too Soon"
13. "In A Bad Place"
14. "Only In November"

== Personnel ==
- Ben Weasel- vocals
- Mike Kennerty- guitar/ producer
- Dan Andriano- bass
- Chris Gaylor- drums
- Cristy Road - artwork
