= Wiggle (album) =

Studio album by Screeching Weasel
- Released: January 15, 1993
- Recorded: June–August 1992
- Studio: Sonic Iguana (Lafayette, Ind.)
- Genre: Punk rock
- Length: 37:56
- Label: Lookout (LK 063); Asian Man (AM 122); Recess (RR 119)
- Producer: Mass Giorgini

Screeching Weasel chronology
Ramones (1992)	Wiggle (1993)	Anthem for a New Tomorrow (1993)

Professional ratings
Review scores
Source	Rating
Allmusic	4/5 stars

Wiggle is the fifth studio album by the Chicago-based punk rock band Screeching Weasel. Initially planned for release in November 1992, the album was finally released on CD, vinyl and cassette on January 15, 1993, through Lookout Records. Due to a "cymbal hissing" in the original vinyl version, the album was remixed and re-released soon afterwards.

After the band's popularity had grown with their previous album My Brain Hurts, the group felt pressured with the follow-up album. While most of Wiggle is in a similar vein to their previous album, some songs saw the band experimenting with new wave and a few featured a more hardcore-influenced sound reminiscent of the group's earlier material. In retrospect, vocalist Ben Weasel has voiced dissatisfaction with the album, mainly the songs that were chosen for it. However, he considers the band's performance and the album's production better than My Brain Hurts.

The album was remastered and reissued by Asian Man Records in 2005 shortly after the band had removed its catalog from Lookout due to unpaid royalties and a vinyl version was released by Recess Records in 2009.

== Background ==
Shortly after the recording of My Brain Hurts, bassist Dave Naked was fired from the band at the insistence of guitarist Dan Vapid and was initially replaced by Scott "Gub" Conway, who toured with the band in support of the album. Conway himself was replaced after the tour by Vindictives bassist Johnny Personality, who vocalist Ben Weasel considered an “outstanding bass player". Weasel had briefly played with The Vindictives in 1990 on their first EP and Personality auditioned for Weasel and John Jughead's band the Gore Gore Girls during Screeching Weasel's brief break-up the same year. In February 1992, the band went to engineer Steve Albini's house in Chicago to record demos for their next album, with Albini serving as engineer and Naked Raygun drummer Eric Spicer producing. Two of the songs from the session, "Crying in My Beer" and "Jeannie's Got a Problem with Her Uterus", were re-recorded for Wiggle, while "Going Home" was released on a split EP with the Pink Lincolns (and later released on the CD version of the album) and "Celena" was featured on the compilation album It's a Punk Thing, You Wouldn't Understand.

== Recording ==
In June 1992, the band went to Sonic Iguana Studios in Lafayette, Indiana, to record Wiggle with studio owner Mass Giorgini producing. Giorgini would go on to produce several of the band's later albums and also served as their bassist from 1996 to 2001. The band recorded several songs during the sessions, including the non-album single "Radio Blast" and its b-side "The Girl Next Door", a re-working of the song "Cindy's on Methadone" titled "Shirley's on Methadone" for a film called Shirley Pimple (which was never released as the director ended up in prison) and a cover of the song "Achtung" by the band The Authorities for a tribute album (which was also never released). Another song from the session, "Amy Saw Me Looking at Her Boobs", originated as a composition by Joe King (Joe Queer) of The Queers from 1990 that Weasel finished. The song was later re-worked by The Queers as "Fuck the World" on their album Love Songs for the Retarded, which Screeching Weasel also recorded a version of. Weasel later called the sessions for the album an "enormous pain in the ass" due to the long recording process and that he "wasn't singing like [him]self", saying his vocals on the album were "horrible." He also stated that he was having relationship problems with his girlfriend at the time of the recording, which resulted in "fucking up [his] head" and having "no idea what should go on the album and what shouldn't."

== Track listing ==
All tracks are written by Ben Weasel, except where noted.

Side one
No.	Title	Length
1.	"Hanging Around" (written by Screeching Weasel)	3:31
2.	"I'm Not in Love"	2:00
3.	"One Step Beyond"	3:04
4.	"I Was a High School Psychopath" (written by Dan Vapid)	2:07
5.	"Crying in My Beer"	3:51
6.	"Slomotion" (written by Johnny Personality and Weasel)	1:20
7.	"Like a Parasite" (written by Weasel and Joe King)	3:20

Side two
No.	Title	Length
8.	"Joanie Loves Johnny"	1:58
9.	"Second Floor East"	2:58
10.	"Automatic Rejector" (written by Screeching Weasel)	1:49
11.	"Jeannie's Got a Problem with Her Uterus"	2:04
12.	"Sad Little Girl" (written by Weasel, Vapid and Personality)	2:57
13.	"Ain't Got No Sense" (written by Frank Kerr, Gord Lewis, Steve Mahon and Nick Stipanitz; originally performed by Teenage Head)	3:46
14.	"It's All in My Head"	3:11

Lookout CD bonus tracks
No.	Title	Original appearance	Length
15.	"Teenage Slumber Party"	Achtung Chicago compilation (1989)	2:25
16.	"Danny Is a Wimp" (written by King)	Previously unreleased	0:59
17.	"Going Home" (lyrics by Aaron Cometbus)	Screeching Weasel / Pink Lincolns split EP (1993)	2:41

Asian Man bonus track
No.	Title	Original appearance	Length
18.	"Fuck the World" (written by Weasel and King)	Previously unreleased	2:10

== Personnel ==
- Ben Weasel – lead vocals
- John Jughead – guitar
- Danny Vapid – guitar, backing vocals, bass on "Teenage Slumber Party"
- Johnny Personality – bass, backing vocals
- Dan Panic – drums

Additional performers

- Doug Ward – rhythm guitar on "Teenage Slumber Party"
- Brian Vermin – drums on "Teenage Slumber Party"

Production

- Mass Giorgini – producer, engineer
- Todd Barrett – album layout
- Martin Sorrondeguy; Dan Mueller – photography
- Eric Spicer – producer on "Going Home"
- Steve Albini – engineer on "Going Home"
