= The Vindictives =

American punk rock band

Background information
- Origin: Chicago, Illinois
- Genres: Punk rock
- Years active: 1991–1996, 1999, 2012–present
- Labels: VML, Lookout! Records, Liberation Records, Selfless Records
- Members: Joey Vindictive
- Past members: Ben Weasel, Erik Elsewhere, Dr. Bob, Billy Blastoff, P.J. Parti, Angel Ledezma, Mike Byrne, Johnny Personality
- Website: vindictivesmusic.com

The Vindictives are an American, Chicago-based punk rock group, founded by singer and songwriter Joey Vindictive in 1991, releasing 12 EPs and albums by July 1996.

== History ==
They began their career in 1991, cutting their first 7-inch record later that year with the lineup of Joey Vindictive (vocals), Johnny Personality (bass), Ben Weasel (guitar), Dr. Bob (guitar), and Erik Elsewhere (drums). Weasel was soon to be replaced by Billy Blastoff on guitar, and Elsewhere was soon to be replaced by P.J. Parti on drums.

The band broke up in 1996 due to Joey Vindictive's health issues. They would re-form in 2000.

Guitarist Robert "Dr. Bob" Nielsen died of a heroin overdose on February 22, 2003. After Dr. Bob's death, The Vindictives released a pair of records containing material previously unavailable on CD and two new re-recordings; Muzak for Robots which was quirky electronic instrumental versions of their songs and Unplugged soft and toned-down acoustic versions of their works. The Razorcake review read "This really is muzak. No, really".

In 2004, Billy Blastoff left the Vindictives of his own accord, took a year off music, joined Lucky Savage in Chicago as their drummer, formed the Gornys and switched over to bass in 2005, eventually renamed them the John Doh's in 2010, and is currently on hiatus.

In 2006, Shot Baker and Vacation Bible School released a limited edition of 500 split 7-inch singles on Chicago's Underground Communique Records featuring The Vindictives' "Future Homemakers of America", "Glad to Be", "Assembly Line", and "Automaton".

In 2006, Joey Vindictive and Johnny Personality started to demo material under Joey Vindictive & The Personality Crisis. The two performed under the name Faerie Wunderpuss, releasing a split 12-inch LP with Chicago's own Alla, an experimental heavy rock psychedelia band, and is said to be in the vein of Queens of the Stone Age. In addition to possible new material surfacing, Joey Vindictive launched a new theatre art program called The 1901 Gallery Theatre with wife, Jenny, and bandmate, Johnny Personality. In 2011, Billy Blastoff joined Magatha Trysty, a culmination of power pop and punk rock sensibility, as their bass player.

On December 4, 2012, the Vindictives released their first new material in 13 years with an EP titled "Mono Flexi".

In 2013, the Vindictives digitally released a Halloween EP entitled "Jerk-O-Lantern" which featured 13 songs recorded on Friday the 13th, 2013 and is a total of 13 minutes and 13 seconds in length.

== Members ==
- Joey Vindictive (Joey Volino) - vocals (1990–1996, 1999–Present)
- Johnny Personality (John Stockfisch) - bass (1990–1996, 1999–2018)
- Dr. Bob (Robert Nielson) - guitar (1990–1996)
- Billy Blastoff (Bill Sullivan) - guitar (1992–1996, 1999–2004)
- P.J. Parti (Pat Buckley) - drums (1991–1996)
- Ben Weasel (Ben Foster) - guitar (1990–1992)
- Erik Elsewhere - drums (1990–1991)
- Angel Gabriel Ledezma - drums (1999)
- Mike Geek (Mike Byrne) - guitar (1994–1996)

== Discography ==
=== Singles and EPs ===
- Basket Case, V.M.L. Records, 1991
- The Invisible Man, V.M.L. Records, 1991
- Ugly American 7-inch, V.M.L. Records, 1992
- Assembly Line 7-inch, V.M.L. Records, 1992
- This Is My Face 7-inch, V.M.L. Records, 1993
- Disturbia 7-inch, V.M.L. Records, 1993
- Rocks In My Head 7-inch, V.M.L. Records, 1994
- Seventeen b/w No Feelings 5", Selfless Records/V.M.L. Records, 1994
- Johnny Where Are You? b/w Eating Me Alive Picture Disk 7-inch, Lookout! Records/V.M.L. Records, 1995
- Alarm Clocks b/w Left For Dead 7-inch, Lookout/V.M.L. Records, 1995
- Pervert At Large b/w Sloppy Seconds Split 7-inch, V.M.L. Records, 1997
- Nuttin' for Christmas b/w Jingle Bells 7-inch, Stardumb Records, 2002
- Mono-Flexi EP 7-inch, Sexy Baby Records, 2012
- Jerk-O-Lantern EP, 2013

=== Studio albums ===
- Partytime for Assholes 10-inch - Double 10-inch LP, Selfless Records, 1996 Reissue: Liberation Records 1994
- Leave Home LP, Selfless Records, 1994
- Hypno-Punko LP, Coldfront/V.M.L. Records, 1999
- Muzak for Robots, TEAT, 2003 (instrumentals)
- Unplugged, TEAT, 2003 (acoustic versions of old Vindictives songs)

=== Compilation albums ===
- The Many Moods Of The Vindictives Double LP, Lookout/V.M.L. Records, 1995 Reissue: Liberation Records 1995
- Curious Oddities and the Bare Essentials, TEAT, 2003
- Original Masters (1990–1992), TEAT, 2003
