= Riverdales =

American punk rock band

- Origin: Chicago, Illinois, U.S.
- Genres: Punk rock, pop punk
- Years active: 1994–1997, 2003, 2008–2011
- Labels: Fat Wreck Chords, Recess, Asian Man, 1-4-5, Honest Don's, Lookout!
- Spinoff of: Screeching Weasel
- Past members: Ben Foster; Dan Schafer; Drew Fredrichsen; Adam Cargin; Dan Sullivan; Dan Lumley; Simon Lamb; Justin Perkins
- Website: Official Website; Official MySpace

The Riverdales were an American punk rock band from Chicago, Illinois, United States, made up of Screeching Weasel members. Bassist Dan Vapid (Dan Schafer) and guitarist Ben Weasel (Ben Foster) are heavily influenced by the Ramones' sound and both serve as front-men, sharing lead vocals for the band. The Riverdales' original run lasted from 1994-1997. They reformed in 2003 to record their third studio album, and then parted ways until they once again reformed in 2008 and released a fourth studio album in July, 2009. The band's fifth studio album, Tarantula, was released digitally on June 8, 2010 and on CD and vinyl on June 22, 2010. The band broke up in March 2011 after a fight that broke out during a Screeching Weasel performance.

== History ==
Named after the small town of Riverdale from the Archie Comics, the Riverdales formed in 1994. The founding members, Ben Foster (guitar), Dan Schafer (bass), and Dan Sullivan (drums) were all former members of Screeching Weasel which had broken up earlier that year. Unlike Screeching Weasel, the members of the Riverdales were credited under their real names. They released their self-titled debut studio album in June 1995 on Lookout! Records. It was produced by Green Day's Billie Joe Armstrong and Squirtgun's Mass Giorgini. They toured extensively that year as the opening act for the Mr. T Experience, and then for Green Day. Playing off this synergy, the Riverdales supported Green Day's Insomniac tour in 1995. Also that year, the band's song "Back to You" appeared in the film Angus. Despite the reforming of Screeching Weasel in 1996, the Riverdales did not disband until after recording their second studio album, Storm the Streets in 1997 and only reforming briefly in 2003 to record their third studio album, Phase 3.

In 2004, Foster rescinded all of the Riverdales masters from Lookout! Records. All of these masters had then been licensed to Asian Man Records. Asian Man re-released the band's debut album in 2006 with re-mastered sound and some bonus tracks including the two previously unreleased songs, "Two-Headed Girl" and "I Won't Forget You", and live tracks from their tour with Green Day. The label also re-issued Phase 3 on October 7, 2008, with five bonus tracks.

On November 19, 2008, on his ESPN radio show, Weasel Radio, Ben Weasel announced that he and Dan Vapid had been demoing songs for a new Riverdales album and that recording would begin in February 2009. He also announced that the Riverdales would be playing live one-off shows again and that Adam Cargin (of the Blueheels) would be the band's new drummer. The album, titled Invasion U.S.A., was released on July 14, 2009.

In September 2009, it was announced that Simon Lamb would be joining the band as a second guitarist. Prior to that for live purposes, Dan Schafer was playing second guitar and singing while Justin Perkins, who had recorded Invasion U.S.A., played bass guitar. A couple months later in November 2009, Mike Park of Asian Man Records announced that Weasel had decided to sever his relationship with the label and that Recess Records would now be carrying the Screeching Weasel, Riverdales and Ben Weasel's solo back catalogues.

On December 13, 2009, Weasel announced on Twitter that the fifth Riverdales album would be called Tarantula, they began recording the next day. Weasel has stated that if he had had his way, Invasion U.S.A. would have been a double LP and that Tarantula should be considered part two of Invasion U.S.A.. Tarantula was released on June 8, 2010 as a digital download and June 22 on CD and vinyl.

In December 2010, the band announced they had signed to Fat Wreck Chords, and the label would be re-releasing some of their old material.

In March 2011, Ben Weasel was involved in an altercation with two female audience members at a Screeching Weasel show at the Austin, Texas SXSW Festival. This resulted in the other members of both Screeching Weasel and the Riverdales quitting the band. In the aftermath of this, former members Dan Vapid and Simon Lamb started a solo project called Dan Vapid and the Cheats with whom Vapid will be singing his Riverdales songs.

== Discography ==
=== Studio albums ===
- Riverdales (1995)
- Storm the Streets (1997)
- Phase Three (2003)
- Invasion USA (2009)
- Tarantula (2010)

=== Singles ===
- "Back to You" (1995)
- "Fun Tonight" (1995)
- "Blood on the Ice" (1997)
- "Dead End House" (2011)
- "When in Rome" (2011)
