= Bark Like a Dog =

Studio album by Screeching Weasel
- Released: November 5, 1996
- Recorded: May–July, 1996 at Uberstudio, Chicago, IL
- Genres: Punk rock; pop punk; skate punk
- Length: 34:42
- Label: Fat Wreck Chords
- Producers: Mass Giorgini, Ben Weasel

Screeching Weasel chronology
| Kill the Musicians (1995) | Bark Like a Dog (1996) | Television City Dream (1998) |

Professional ratings
Review scores
| Source | Rating |
|---|---|
| AllMusic | 4/5 stars |

Bark Like a Dog is the eighth studio album by the American punk rock band Screeching Weasel. It was released in 1996 through Fat Wreck Chords. It was the band's first album released through Fat Wreck Chords. It was also the band's first album since they disbanded for the second time. The split lasted just over a year, and during that time 3/4 of the band (all minus Jughead) played together in the Riverdales. It was the band's only album to ever place a ranking on the Billboard charts.

== Track listing ==
All songs by Ben Weasel, except where noted.

1. "Get off My Back" (Ben Weasel/Dan Vapid) – 2:38
2. "Cool Kids" – 2:13
3. "First Day of Summer" – 3:38
4. "You'll Be in My Dreams Today" – 2:38
5. "You Blister My Paint" – 3:20
6. "Stupid Girl" – 2:38
7. "Phasers on Kill" – 2:29
8. "Handcuffed to You" – 3:25
9. "(She Got) Electroshocked" – 2:27
10. "It's Not Enough" – 3:52
11. "I Will Always Be There" – 2:38
12. "Your Name Is Tattooed on My Heart" – 2:46

== Chart performance ==
| Chart | Peak position |
|---|---|
| U.S. Top Heatseekers | 34 |

== Personnel ==
- Ben Weasel - lead vocals, lead guitar
- Jughead - rhythm guitar
- Dan Vapid - bass, backing vocals
- Dan Panic - drums, backing vocals
- Teakettle Jones - keyboards on "Cool Kids" (Teakettle Jones are Ben Weasel & Mass Giorgini playing together)
- Jimmy Spectacular - keyboards on "The First Day of Summer" (Jimmy Spectacular is Ben Weasel)
