= Dan Vapid =

American musician

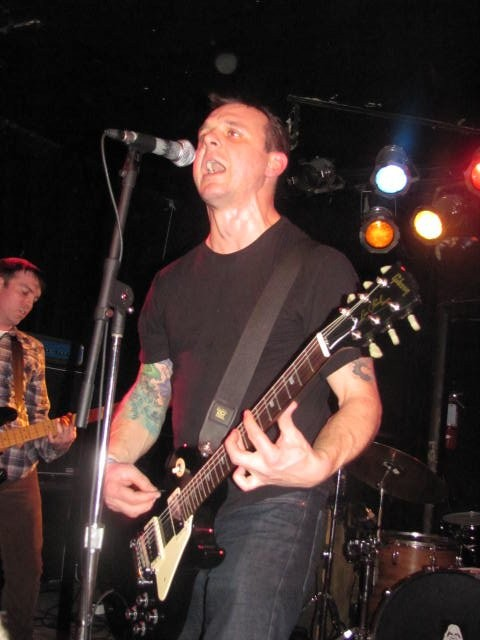

Background information
- Also known as: Sewercap; Dan Vapid; Danny Vapid
- Born: Dan Schafer; January 18, 1970 (age 56)
- Origin: Chicago, Illinois, U.S.
- Genres: Punk rock, pop punk
- Occupation: Musician
- Instruments: Vocals, guitar, bass guitar
- Years active: 1985–present
- Labels: Lookout!, Asian Man, Red Scare, Recess, Selfless Records, Fat Wreck Chords
- Formerly of: Screeching Weasel, The Methadones, The Queers, Sludgeworth, Riverdales, Noise By Numbers, Dan Vapid and the Cheats

Dan Schafer (born January 18, 1970), better known by his stage name Dan Vapid, is a punk rock musician from Chicago, Illinois, United States. He is best known for his participation in Screeching Weasel, The Riverdales, The Methadones, and various other punk rock/pop punk bands. His current band is Dan Vapid and the Cheats.

== Generation Waste ==
Schafer's first band was the hardcore punk band Generation Waste, formed in 1985. They were around for 4 years and recorded one album, which remains unreleased. He was the vocalist and the other band members were Ted Domurat (later of Gear) on guitar, Frank Ciampi (later of Tension Wire, Devastation, Mindfunk) on bass and Dave Juarez on drums. Juarez was later replaced by Pat Buckley (later of Gear, The Vindictives (as "P.J. Parti")).

== Screeching Weasel ==
In 1989, Schafer became the bass player for Screeching Weasel, though he switched back and forth from bass to guitar several times over the band's history. He performs under the pseudonym Dan Vapid or Danny Vapid, although he was originally called Sewercap when he joined the band. Screeching Weasel disbanded when Schafer and Brian Vermin, the drummer, quit the band to concentrate on their side project, Sludgeworth.

Schafer spoke about his time with Screeching Weasel in a March 2011 interview with Jason Duarte for Squid Pro Quo.

Screeching Weasel has been through many incarnations, some which include Schafer and some which do not. He was the guitarist for the 2011 version of the band, which did not include founding member John Jughead. That version of the band ended on March 23, 2011 when all the members quit the band following an incident at SXSW.

== Sludgeworth ==
Sludgeworth was formed in 1989 as a side project from Screeching Weasel for Schafer (vocals) and Vermin (drums). Completing the line-up were Adam White (guitar), Dave McClean (guitar) and Mike Hootenstrat (bass). The band broke up in 1992 shortly after Schafer rejoined Screeching Weasel.

== The Riverdales ==
The Riverdales were formed in 1994 by three members of Screeching Weasel (Ben Foster, Dan Schafer, and Dan Sullivan) when the former band disbanded. Just like with Screeching Weasel, Schafer played bass for the Riverdales but this time also shared lead vocals with Foster. They released their self-titled debut album in 1995 and their second album Storm the Streets in 1997 before the band broke up after Screeching Weasel reformed. They reformed in 2003 to release their third (and supposedly final) album. They once again reformed in 2008 and released albums in 2009 and 2010. The band has been inactive since March 23, 2011 when all of the members quit on Ben Weasel under bad circumstances at a Screeching Weasel show.

== The Queers ==
Schafer played guitar for The Queers in 1994 and 2002. He is present on The Queer's third studio album Beat Off (1994), Suck This (1995) and the Surf Goddess EP (1994).

== The Mopes and The Methadones ==
The Mopes were a side-project for Schafer (vocals, guitar) and B-Face (bass). The line-up was completed with John Jughead (guitar) and Dan Lumley (drums). The band existed from 1996 through 1998. The Methadones were a side project that Schafer began in 1993 but sat on the back-burner for a number of years. In 1999, Schafer re-launched the group, recruiting former Mopes B-Face and Dan Lumley to record an album, Ill at Ease. After the recording, he established a new, Chicago-based line up. The Chicago line-up included Schafer (vocals, guitar), Mike Byrne (guitar), Sensitive Pete (bass) and Mike Soucy (drums). The band disbanded in 2010.

== Noise By Numbers ==
Noise By Numbers was formed in 2008 with Schafer (vocals, guitar), Jeff Dean (guitar), Rick Uncapher (bass) and Neil Hennessy (drums). Hennessy left after the first album and was replaced by Jimmy Lucido. A second album was released in July 2011.

== Dan Vapid and the Cheats ==
Following the demise of Screeching Weasel after the SXSW debacle, Schafer formed a new band called Dan Vapid and the Cheats featuring bassist Simon Lamb (from Screeching Weasel and the Riverdales), guitarist Mike Byrne and drummer Mike Soucy (both from the Methadones). The band recorded a studio album in October 2011, with Justin Perkins producing, at the Mystery Room.

== Partial discography ==
Screeching Weasel

- Punkhouse (1989)
- My Brain Hurts (1991)
- Ramones (1992)
- Wiggle (1993)
- Anthem for a New Tomorrow (1993)
- Bark Like a Dog (1996)
- First World Manifesto (2011)

Sludgeworth

- What's This? (1991)
- Losers of the Year (1995)
- Second Time Around (2026)

The Queers

- Beat Off (1994)
- Surf Goddess (1995)
- Suck This (1995)

Riverdales

- Riverdales (1995)
- Storm the Streets (1997)
- Phase Three (2003)
- Invasion U.S.A. (2009)
- Tarantula (2010)

The Mopes

- Lowdown, Two-Bit, Sidewinder (1996)
- Accident Waiting to Happen (1998)

The Methadones

- Ill at Ease (2001)
- Career Objective (2003)
- Not Economically Viable (2004)
- 21st Century Power Pop Riot (2006)
- This Won't Hurt... (2007)
- The Methadones/The Copyrights Split (2008)
- The Methadones (2010)

Ben Weasel

- Fidatevi (2002)
- The Brain That Wouldn't Die (2009)

Noise by Numbers

- Yeah, Whatever... (2009)
- Over Leavitt (2011)

Dan Vapid and the Cheats

- Dan Vapid and the Cheats (2012)
- Two (2013)
- Three (2019)
- Escape Velocity (2021)
- Welcome To Dystopia (2022)

Solo albums

- All Wound Up (2016)
- All Wound Up Vol. 2 (2018)

== Philanthropy ==
Schafer contributed a song on the charity album for Children's Memorial Hospital by the Chicago super group The Black Sheep Band, A Chicago Punk Rock Collaboration for the Kids, Vol 1. He plays guitar on all the tracks as well.
