= Dan Panic =

American drummer

Dan Sullivan, also known as Dan Panic or Danny Panic, is an American punk rock drummer from Chicago.

== Career ==
Dan Sullivan began his musical career with Ivy League, a quartet from Chicago's western suburbs who released one 7-inch EP in 1990. He then joined Screeching Weasel in 1991 and remained with the band until 1997. He also played with The Riverdales, Cinco De Gatos, and The Queers during his time with Screeching Weasel. After leaving Screeching Weasel, Panic relocated to San Francisco where he eventually drummed for the bands Groovie Ghoulies, Pansy Division, The Plus Ones, The Avengers (sometimes called "The Scavengers" during this period), and Beulah, usually performing under his real name. In December 2016, Panic joined Squirtgun, a band formed by fellow Screeching Weasel alum and producer Mass Giorgini, who had produced records by bands Panic had performed with, including Screeching Weasel, the Queers, the Riverdales, and the Groovie Ghoulies.

== Partial discography ==
- My Brain Hurts – Screeching Weasel (1991)
- Ramones – Screeching Weasel (1992)
- Wiggle – Screeching Weasel (1993)
- Anthem for a New Tomorrow – Screeching Weasel (1993)
- How to Make Enemies and Irritate People – Screeching Weasel (1994)
- Beat Off – The Queers (1994)
- Riverdales – The Riverdales (1995)
- Bark Like a Dog – Screeching Weasel (1996)
- Storm the Streets – The Riverdales (1997)
- Re-Animation Festival – Groovie Ghoulies (1997)
- On The List – The Plus Ones (2001)
- The Coast Is Never Clear – Beulah (2001)
- Yoko – Beulah (2003)
