= Panic Button Records =

Music Record Label

Panic Button Records was a record label which was formed in Chicago, Illinois in 1997. It was co-owned by Ben Weasel and John Jughead, both members of punk rock band Screeching Weasel. In 1998 the label was purchased by Lookout! Records when Screeching Weasel re-signed to Lookout!.

== Former Artists ==
- Common Rider
- The Dollyrots
- The Eyeliners
- Enemy You
- Even in Blackouts
- The Jackie Papers
- The Jimmies
- The Lillingtons
- Moral Crux
- Screeching Weasel
- The Wanna-Bes
- Ben Weasel
- Yesterday's Kids
- Zero Boys

== See also ==
- List of record labels
