= Ben Weasel =

American singer and guitarist (born 1968)

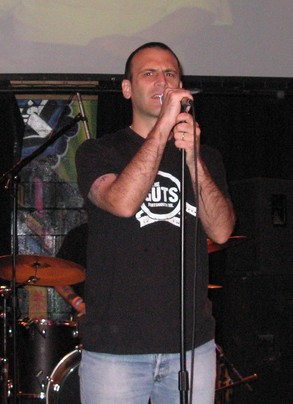
- Weasel performing in 2010

Background information
- Born: Benjamin Foster; April 8, 1968 (age 58); Prospect Heights, Illinois, U.S.
- Genres: Punk rock, pop punk
- Occupations: Singer; musician; songwriter
- Instruments: Vocals; guitar
- Years active: 1986–present
- Member of: Screeching Weasel
- Formerly of: Riverdales; The Vindictives

Benjamin Foster (born April 8, 1968), also known as Ben Weasel, is an American musician best known as the lead singer and guitarist of the punk rock band Screeching Weasel.

== Early life ==
Foster was born in 1968, and was raised in Prospect Heights, Illinois. He attended River Trails Middle School in Mount Prospect, Illinois, where he first met future Screeching Weasel co-founder John Pierson. Weasel was expelled from John Hersey High School and St. Viator High School. He was eventually sent to the Élan School in Poland, Maine for his behavior issues.

== Music career ==
=== Screeching Weasel ===
When Foster returned to Illinois from the Élan School, he got a job at a local movie theater, and formed the band Screeching Weasel with co-worker and former junior high classmate John Pierson, aka Jughead.

Screeching Weasel have released 15 studio albums: Screeching Weasel (1987), Boogadaboogadaboogada! (1988), My Brain Hurts (1991), Ramones (1992), Wiggle (1993), Anthem for a New Tomorrow (1993), How to Make Enemies and Irritate People (1994), Bark Like a Dog (1996), Television City Dream (1998), Emo (1999), Teen Punks in Heat (2000), First World Manifesto (2011), a rock opera entitled Baby Fat: Act 1 on Recess Records (2015), Some Freaks of Atavism (2020), and most recently The Awful Disclosures of Screeching Weasel (2022).

=== The Riverdales and The Vindictives ===
After an initial break-up in 1989, Screeching Weasel reformed in 1991 and broke up for a second time in 1994. Following the second breakup, Foster formed a new band, the Riverdales, with Screeching Weasel members Dan Vapid, and Dan Panic.

In the early 1990s, Foster founded The Gore Gore Girls (unrelated to the later band of the same name) with SW guitarist Jughead, Glynis Johnson (also of Red Red Meat) and Russ Forester (founder of Underdog Records). The Gore Gore Girls lasted only three shows and made an appearance on a compilation EP, Mouthful of Monkey Bile (1992). He also played 2nd guitar in The Vindictives, to be replaced by Billy Blastoff. Foster appeared on the first 4 EPs released by the band. In 1996, Lookout! Records released a 7-inch EP by The Shotdowns which included Foster, Jughead, and rock critic Jim DeRogatis. Foster was credited as "Pappy Le Pew".

Foster reunited with Screeching Weasel again in 1996. The band lasted until 2001 before breaking up again. On March 27, 2009, Foster announced he was reforming Screeching Weasel. He and Danny Vapid were the only returning members.

=== Solo albums ===
In 2002, Foster released his first solo album, Fidatevi. His second album, These Ones Are Bitter, was released in June 2007. A live album (featuring all Screeching Weasel songs, including the majority of the album My Brain Hurts), titled The Brain That Wouldn't Die, appeared in 2009 and featured Screeching Weasel member Danny Vapid as well as Jon Phillip.

=== Panic Button Records ===
Foster formed Chicago-based record label, Panic Button Records, in 1997 with Pierson. The label was later purchased by Lookout! Records.

== Other ventures ==
=== Writing ===
In the early 1990s, Foster published the fanzine Panic Button. He published two chapbooks through Oyster Publications, Brady Bunch Behemoth (1991) and Stab! Stab! Stab! (1992). Weasel also wrote for other various zines, including Razorcake, Non-Stop Banter, Jersey Beat, Hit List and 10 Things Jesus Wants You To Know. He also had a long-running column in MAXIMUM ROCKNROLL, one of the most prominent punk rock fanzines. He wrote a novel in 2001 called Like Hell and put out a collection of his columns and articles in 2002 entitled Punk is a Four Letter Word. Both books were published by Hope and Nonthings, a small publishing house based in Chicago run by former bandmate John Jughead.

=== Acting and directing ===
In 1990 Foster wrote, produced, directed and starred in a low-budget "gay vampire" film entitled Disgusteen.

Foster appeared as himself in the 1994 Bruce LaBruce film Super 8½ in a scene in which he receives fellatio.

=== Weasel Radio ===
Foster co-hosted a weekly radio show with Owen Murphy called Weasel Radio which premiered on ESPN 1070. Weasel Radio eventually became a podcast and its last episode was released on May 5, 2016.

Foster appeared on Ken Reid's TV Guidance Counselor Podcast on September 11, 2015.

He was a guest host on Dying Scene Radio episode 017.

== SXSW incident ==
On Friday, March 18, 2011, at Austin, Texas's SXSW Festival, Foster was involved in an altercation with two women during a Screeching Weasel performance. The first woman threw ice cubes at Foster. Upon being hit with more ice Foster found an unruly woman was the source of the ice. Foster originally stated he "can't kick a girl's ass" and offered money for another woman to handle the attacker. As the ice and spitting continued Foster threatened to beat the woman up himself. The woman then threw beer at Foster, who responded by attacking her. A club owner, also female, then came on stage and grabbed Foster from behind. He pushed her and punched her before being pulled to the other side of the stage by a bouncer.

On March 20, Foster posted an apology on his website BenWeasel.com stating

"I want to apologize to both the club owner and audience member involved for my actions during our show at SXSW on Friday night. While their actions were outside of my control, my regretful reaction is wholly my responsibility. Whatever my feelings are about fans crossing the line like that, I wish I could have that moment back and deal with it in the same spirit as I did the preceding 60 minutes. Since I can't, an apology is all I've got and I sincerely hope those people will accept it. Up front, I wish to say that I am sorry to the fan and any others who were involved. As a husband, father, and a musician on the public stage, I understand that it is my duty to always take responsibility for my actions in a socially acceptable way, and most especially in the face of confrontation."

— Ben Foster.

Following the incident, several bands who were slated to appear at Weasel Fest in Chicago dropped out, including Chinese Telephones, Chixdiggit, The Soviettes, Teenage Bottlerocket and Kepi Ghoulie. On March 23, 2011, the other four members of Screeching Weasel all resigned from the band citing the SXSW incident as the reason. On March 31 it was announced that the entire Weasel Fest had been cancelled. In August, Weasel issued a full article on Screeching Weasel's website describing his whole point of view on the situation.

== Personal life ==
On November 30, 2010, Foster appeared on Last Call with Carson Daly and revealed that he has anxiety, panic attacks, and bouts of agoraphobia.

Foster lives with his wife and 3 children in Madison, Wisconsin. He used to be a Buddhist but then became Catholic.

== Discography ==
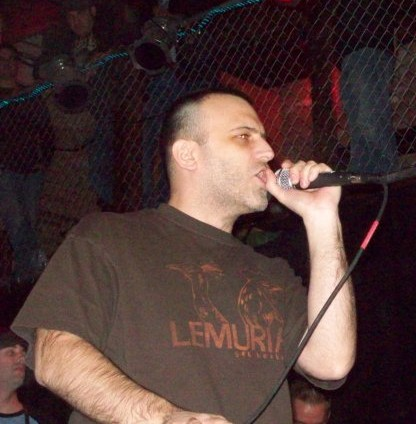
Weasel performing in 2010

=== With Screeching Weasel ===
- Screeching Weasel (1987)
- Boogadaboogadaboogada! (1988)
- My Brain Hurts (1991)
- Ramones (1992)
- Wiggle (1993)
- Anthem for a New Tomorrow (1993)
- How to Make Enemies and Irritate People (1994)
- Bark Like a Dog (1996)
- Television City Dream (1998)
- Emo (1999)
- Teen Punks in Heat (2000)
- First World Manifesto (2011)
- Baby Fat: Act I (2015)
- Some Freaks of Atavism (2020)
- The Awful Disclosures of Screeching Weasel (2022)

=== With Riverdales ===
- Riverdales (1995)
- Storm the Streets (1997)
- Phase Three (2003)
- Invasion U.S.A (2009)
- Tarantula (2010)

=== Solo ===
- Fidatevi (2002)
- These Ones Are Bitter (2007)
- The Brain That Wouldn't Die (2009)
