= Mass Giorgini =

American musician and record producer

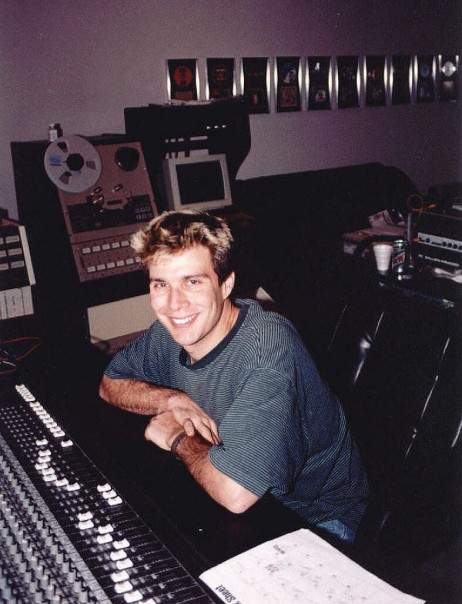
- Giorgini at work in his Sonic Iguana Studios in 1996

Background information
- Also known as: Master Genie
- Born: Massimiliano Adelmo Giorgini; May 22, 1968 (age 58); Lafayette, Indiana, United States
- Genre: Punk rock
- Occupations: Musician, record producer
- Instrument: Bass
- Years active: 1988–present
- Formerly of: Squirtgun

Massimiliano Adelmo Giorgini (born May 22, 1968) is an American bassist and record producer who rose to fame when several of the bands he produced experienced huge gains in popularity during the pop-punk boom of the mid-'90s. Among these bands was Giorgini's own Squirtgun, which received minor MTV rotation and several soundtrack appearances in major films in the 1990s. Mass Giorgini is also a linguistics scholar specializing in forensic literary analysis and is the son of renowned Italian artist Aldo Giorgini.

== Music career ==
Giorgini has played bass guitar, alto and tenor saxophones, and sung backing vocals for a number of punk rock bands including Screeching Weasel, Common Rider, Squirtgun, Rattail Grenadier, The Mopes, Teeth and the Man, Torture the Artist, and Sweet Black And Blue.

As a composer, Giorgini has written songs primarily for his band Squirtgun, but in addition has lent writing assistance to several bands he has produced. His songwriting work also appears in the films Mallrats (Gramercy Pictures) and Bubble Boy (Disney).

As a producer, he has worked in conjunction with leading punk rock figures such as Billie Joe Armstrong of Green Day and Kris Roe of the Ataris, and produced music by bands such as Rise Against, Anti-Flag, and Alkaline Trio. Since 1990, he has owned and operated Sonic Iguana Studios in Lafayette, Indiana. He has been involved in creating the recordings of many bands (sometimes recording, mixing, mastering, and producing). His production work has taken him all over the globe, including production stints in Australia, Spain, Canada, and the Cayman Islands, as well as in numerous states of the United States.

== Discography ==
- Screeching Weasel – Ramones (1992)
- The Queers – Love Songs for the Retarded (1993)
- Screeching Weasel – Wiggle (1993)
- Smoking Popes – Get Fired (1993)
- Screeching Weasel – How to Make Enemies and Irritate People (1994)
- The Queers – Beat Off (1994)
- The Fighters – Breaking Bones for Laughs (1994)
- The Fighters / Winepress – The Rambling Boys of Pleasure (1994)
- The Bollweevils – Stick Your Neck Out! (1994)
- The Queers – Move Back Home (1995)
- The Riverdales – The Riverdales (1995)
- Squirtgun – Squirtgun (1995)
- 88 Fingers Louie – Behind Bars (1995)
- Starbilly – BUZZ Records (1995)
- The Crumbs – The Crumbs (1996)
- The Smugglers – Selling the Sizzle! (1996)
- The Queers – A Day Late and a Dollar Short (1996)
- Cub – Box of Hair (1996)
- Screeching Weasel – Bark Like a Dog (1996)
- The Queers – Don't Back Down (1996)
- Beatnik Termites – Bubblecore (1996)
- The Riverdales – Storm the Streets (1997)
- Squirtgun – Another Sunny Afternoon (1997)
- Groovie Ghoulies – Re-Animation Festival (1997)
- The Huntingtons – Fun and Games (1997)
- Beatnik Termites – Pleasant Dreams (1996)
- The Queers – Punk Rock Confidential (1998)
- Parasites – Rat Ass Pie (1998)
- The Connie Dungs – Earthbound for the Holiday (1999)
- Groovie Ghoulies – Fun in the Dark (1999)
- The Lillingtons – Death By Television (1999)
- Dead Letter Dept. (as The Stiffs) – Forever in a Day (2000)
- Groovie Ghoulies – Travels with my Amp (2000)
- Anti-Flag – Underground Network (2001)
- Rise Against – The Unraveling (2001)
- Caulfield – Sleep Tight, Ya Morons (2001)
- The Real Swinger – Back from Nowhere (2001)
- Ded Bugs – Planet of Blood (2001)
- Common Rider – This is Unity Music (2002)
- Justin Sane – Life, Love and the Pursuit of Justice (2002)
- Groovie Ghoulies – Go! Stories (2002)
- Ben Weasel – Fidatevi (2002)
- The Queers – Pleasant Screams (2002)
- The Copyrights – We Didn't Come Here To Die (2003)
- The Methadones – Career Objective (2003)
- Groovie Ghoulies – Monster Club (2003)
- The Riverdales – Phase Three (2003)
- Squirtgun – Fade to Bright (2003)
- Teen Idols – Nothing to Prove (2003)
- Ded Bugs – Stop and Smell the Stinking Corpse Lilies (2004)
- Resident Genius/Howard Zinn – You Can't Blow Up A Social Relationship (2005)
- Los Pepiniyoz – Lluvia, Lluvia, Lluvia (2005)
- The Vacancy – Heart Attack (2005)
- The Queers – Munki Brain (2007)
- The Riptides – Hang Out (2006)
- The Queers – Grow Up (2007)
- Amuse – Tosche Station Lot Lizards (2007)
- Suckerbox – Suckerbox (2007)
- The Peacocks – Touch and Go (2007)
- Alkaline Trio – Remains (2007)
- Los Pepiniyoz – Carta a la Luna (2007)
- The Riptides – Mental Therapy (2008)
- Squirtgun – Broadcast 02.09.08 (2008)
- Root Hog – Root Hog (2009)
- Viernes13 – Rockaway Hits (2009)
- Karmella's Game – You'll Be Sorry (2009)
- Anti-Flag – The People or the Gun (2009)
- The Riptides – Tales From Planet Earth (2009)
- Torture the Artist – Torture the Artist (2009)
- Tungas – El Espíritu del Tiempo (2010)
- The Riptides – Tough Luck (2010)
- The Peacocks – After All (2010)
- Svetlanas – Svetlanas (2010)
- Squints – Taking Toll (2011)
- Horace Pinker – Local State Inertia (2011)
- Anti-Flag – The General Strike (2012)
- One Man Army – She's an Alarm (2012)
- Svetlanas – Tales from the Alpha BRigade (2013)
- Rise Against – Long Forgotten Songs: B-Sides & Covers 2000–2013 (2013)
- Anti-Flag – Document of Dissent (2014)
- The Copyrights – Report (2014)
- The Grow Ops – The Grow Ops (2015)
- Anti-Flag – American Spring (2015)
- Ducking Punches – Fizzy Brain (2016)
- The Riptides – Canadian Graffiti (2017)
- Frank Muffin – Forest for the Trees (2018)
- The Sweethearts – Traces of Time (2018)
- Ducking Punches – Alamort (2018)
- City Mouse – Get Right (2018)
- Covert Flops – DEFCON 1-2-3-4 (2019)
- Frank Muffin – Year of the Muffin (2020)
- Suzi Moon – Dumb and in Luv (2022)
- Ann Beretta – Rise (2022)
- Hayley and the Crushers – Modern Adult Kicks (2022)
- Anti-Flag – Lies They Tell Our Children (2023)
- Hell's Ditch – Take Cover (2023)
- Kepi and Friends – Full Moon Forever (2023)
- The Phase Problem - The Phase Problem (2023)
- Retarded – Same as the First (2024)
- Squirtgun – Ghostly Sunflowers (2026)

== Academics and background ==
Giorgini is the son of artist Aldo Giorgini. Prior to his career in music, Giorgini earned a degree in Psychology from Purdue University and began a course of graduate study in that same field. When his father became terminally ill with a form of brain cancer, Giorgini suspended his studies in order to care for his ailing father. Following his father's death, Giorgini abandoned his doctorate studies in psychology, and dedicated himself to music. A pair of articles co-authored by Giorgini were published in respected psychology academic journals from Giorgini's period prior to his departure from the field.

Giorgini later returned to academics in the area of Spanish Literature, in which he earned both a Master's and Ph.D. degree from Purdue University in Cervantes Studies at the same university. He has published several articles in academic journals and chapters in book-length studies on literature and film. Most of his research has been on the investigation of encoded messages protesting the Inquisition written between the lines of the novel Don Quixote by Miguel de Cervantes. In March 2014, Giorgini delivered a TEDx Talk at Purdue University summarizing some of his research on the same topic.

Giorgini was the model for the fictional character "Max" in the novel Weasels in a Box by John Jughead. In the novel, the character "Max" is a punk rock producer who also studies the literary figure Don Quixote.

Giorgini has taught Audio Production Techniques in the Theatre Department at Purdue University, as well as Italian and Spanish in the Foreign Language Department of the same institution. In addition to his ongoing research on Cervantes and his production work, Giorgini presents at symposia on forensic techniques in the analysis of coded language.
