= John Pierson (musician) =

American musician

John Pierson, known also by the stage name Jughead and by the pseudonym Ian Pierce, is an American musician, writer, actor, and podcaster.

== Biography ==
In 1986, Pierson and Ben Weasel co-founded the punk rock band Screeching Weasel in Chicago, Illinois. Pierson played guitar for the band until 2006.

In 2002, Pierson formed the acoustic pop-punk band Even in Blackouts, with which he has recorded four albums and one EP and toured several times.

Pierson is also a playwright and novelist, usually writing under the name Ian Pierce. He formed a theater production company, Hope And Nonthings, in 1990 and produced ten plays before joining the Neo-Futurists; he has been performing in their long-running show Too Much Light Makes the Baby Go Blind since 1996.

His semi-fictitious Weasels in a Box (2005) is a novelization of Screeching Weasel's history. His last novel, Last Temptation of Clarence Odbody, appeared in October 2011.
