= Debutante (disambiguation) =

A debutante is a girl or young lady from an aristocratic or upper-class family introduced to society at a formal "debut" presentation.

Debutante may also refer to:

== Music ==
- Debutante (Nash Kato album) (2000)
- Debutante (Cait Brennan album) (2016)
- "Debutante", a 1995 song by Aztec Camera from Frestonia
- "Debutante", a 2000 song by U.S. Crush from U.S. Crush
- "Debutante", a 2002 song by The Ziggens
- "Debutante", a 2007 song by Great Lakes Myth Society from Compass Rose Bouquet
- "Debutante", a 2010 song by 65daysofstatic from We Were Exploding Anyway
- "The Debutante", a 1917 trumpet composition by Herbert L. Clarke
- The Debutantes, a vocal group that sang "Optimistic Voices" for the 1939 film The Wizard of Oz
- The Debutantes, a vocal girl group, in the United States, in the 1960s

== Other uses ==
- The Debutantes (film), a Philippine film
- Debutantes (book series), young adult series by Jennifer Lynn Barnes

== See also ==
- The Debutante Hour, a trio based in New York City
- Debutante Stakes (disambiguation)
