= Punkhouse =

- Original Limited Potential cover

EP by Screeching Weasel
- Released: July 7, 1989; September 1991; November 1993
- Recorded: April 1989
- Studio: Studio One in Chicago
- Genre: Punk rock
- Length: 10:03
- Label: Limited Potential (LimP 003); No Budget (NBR 001); Selfless (SFLS 018)
- Producer: Mike Potential

Screeching Weasel chronology
Punkhouse (1989)	Pervo Devo (1991)

Punkhouse is the first EP by the Chicago-based punk rock band Screeching Weasel. The EP was originally released on 7-inch vinyl with a limited pressing of 500 copies on July 7, 1989 through Limited Potential Records. It was the band's only non-compilation release to feature drummer Brian Vermin and the first to feature Dan Vapid (then known as Sewercap), who would be featured on many later Screeching Weasel albums. Musically, the songs on Punkhouse are in a similar vein to the band's previous album Boogadaboogadaboogada!, albeit with a rougher sound.

The EP went out of print quickly, and vocalist Ben Weasel repressed it himself on his own label No Budget Records in 1991 without a jacket. The last repress was by Selfless Records in 1993, who released it with a slightly different cover from the original. The song "Fathead" was later re-recorded for the group's third album My Brain Hurts in 1991 and all the original tracks from the EP were included on the compilation Kill the Musicians in 1995.

== Background and recording ==
After releasing their second album Boogadaboogadaboogada! in late 1988, drummer Steve Cheese left the band because he was unwilling to tour and was replaced with Brian McQuade (renamed "Brian Vermin"). The band then went on the "No Showers 'til Gainesville" tour with local band Spongetunnel, which vocalist Ben Weasel called a "minor disaster" as the two bands argued constantly. Tensions grew within Screeching Weasel at the last show of the tour and, two weeks later, bassist Warren Fish left the band. Fish was replaced by Dan Schafer (renamed "Sewercap" and later known as "Dan Vapid"), a fan of Screeching Weasel's who had been the singer for various local hardcore bands.

Before starting their next tour, the band decided to record an EP and went to Studio One in Chicago in April 1989. Mike Potential, founder of the fanzine Limited Potential, served as producer/engineer and opted to release the EP on his new label Limited Potential Records. The entire EP was recorded without John Jughead's guitar, due to him being stranded in downstate Illinois. When Jughead finally made it to the sessions, the other members made him hurry recording his parts and did not notice that his guitar was out of tune with the other guitars on the recordings. Weasel later called Potential a "terrible engineer" and cited the recording quality of the EP, and him writing the lyrics to the songs while drunk, as why Punkhouse is his least favorite Screeching Weasel release.

== Track listing ==
All tracks are written by Ben Weasel, except where noted.

Side one
No.	Title	Length
1.	"Punkhouse" (music by John Jughead)	2:18
2.	"Fathead" (music by Weasel, Sewercap and Jughead)	1:17
3.	"Good Morning"	2:15

Side two
No.	Title	Length
4.	"I Need Therapy"	1:23
5.	"I Think We're Alone Now" (written by Ritchie Cordell; originally performed by Tommy James and the Shondells)	0:59
6.	"Something Wrong" (music by Screeching Weasel)	1:51
Total length:		10:03

== Personnel ==
- Ben Weasel – lead vocals, rhythm guitar
- John Jughead – lead guitar, backing vocals
- Sewercap – bass
- Brian Vermin – drums

Production

- Mike Potential – producer, engineer
- Ben Weasel; John Jughead – mixers
- Donnie Kraft – mastering
- Martin Sorrondeguy – photography
