= Valerie Loves Me =

Single by Material Issue

from the album International Pop Overthrow
- Released: 1991
- Genre: Power pop
- Length: 3:04
- Label: Mercury
- Songwriter: Jim Ellison
- Producer: Jeff Murphy

Material Issue singles chronology
"Renee Remains The Same" (1989)	"Valerie Loves Me" (1991)	"Diane" (1991)

Music video
- "Valerie Loves Me" on YouTube

"Valerie Loves Me" is a song by American power pop trio Material Issue, released in 1991 as a single from their debut album International Pop Overthrow. The song, written by the band's singer-guitarist Jim Ellison, peaked at number three on the U.S. Billboard Modern Rock Tracks chart.

== Music and lyrics ==
Written by singer-guitarist Jim Ellison, "Valerie Loves Me" is about a neighbor girl that Ellison had a crush on when he was 11 years old. The narrator often sees her and imagines what she's thinking, but is unable to catch her attention. Later in the song he envisions her growing old alone, at which point, "she can't have me." In a 2011 interview, drummer Mike Zelenko recalled that the song's guitar hook was inspired by the David Bowie single "John, I'm Only Dancing".

== Release and reception ==
The music video for "Valerie Loves Me" was in heavy rotation on MTV's 120 Minutes program in early 1991. In February the song entered the Billboard Modern Rock Tracks chart, where it spent 11 weeks, peaking at number three in April.

In a retrospective review of the song, AllMusic writer Joslyn Layne called it "a signature power pop single of the early '90s" and noted that it became a "cult favorite through air play on alternative rock and college radio stations". Annie Zaleski of Salon described it as a "jangly power-pop classic". Jeff Cloud, former bassist for Starflyer 59, named "Valerie Loves Me" as his favorite American power-pop song, saying it exemplified the era he came from. Guitarist Dan Vapid of Screeching Weasel said that the idea for "Veronica Hates Me", a song from the punk band's 1991 album My Brain Hurts, came in response to "Valerie Loves Me".

== Charts ==
Weekly chart performance for "Valerie Loves Me"
Chart (1991)	Peak position
US Modern Rock Tracks (Billboard)	3

1991 year-end chart performance for "Valerie Loves Me"
Chart (1991)	Position
US Modern Rock Tracks (Billboard)	30
