= My Brain Hurts =

Studio album by Screeching Weasel
- Released: September 1991
- Recorded: July 1991
- Studios: Art of Ears, San Francisco
- Genres: Punk rock, pop punk
- Length: 31:03
- Labels: Lookout (LK 050); Asian Man (AM 120); Recess (RR 117)
- Producers: Andy Ernst and Larry Livermore

Screeching Weasel chronology
Boogadaboogadaboogada! (1988)	My Brain Hurts (1991)	Ramones (1992)

My Brain Hurts is the third studio album by the Chicago-based punk rock band Screeching Weasel. The album was originally released on CD, vinyl and cassette in September 1991 through Lookout Records. It was the group's first album on Lookout as well as the only release with bassist Dave Naked and the first with drummer Dan Panic, the latter of which would go on to appear on several of the band's albums. The album marked a very distinct stylistic shift for the group, fully moving toward a Ramones-inspired sound and completely abandoning their previous hardcore punk influences as a condition made by vocalist Ben Weasel when reforming the band after a brief break-up.

After the release of My Brain Hurts, the band grew increasingly popular within the punk community and began drawing bigger crowds at their shows, which Weasel later admitted put pressure on him when recording the follow-up album Wiggle the next year. The album is regarded as one of the group's best releases by critics, fans and the band members themselves. It is one of the band's best-selling releases and is often cited as influential to many later pop punk bands.

In 2005, the band removed their catalog from Lookout due to unpaid royalties, alongside many other artists, and re-released the album on CD in remastered form though Asian Man Records later that year. A vinyl edition with different cover art was also issued by Recess Records in 2009.

== Background ==
During the tour just after the band released the Punkhouse EP, drummer Brian Vermin and bassist Sewercap formed their own band called Sludgeworth and started showing less interest in Screeching Weasel. During a stop in Berkeley, California, the group went to Sergay's Recording Emporium to record songs for compilation appearances and, after the tour, Vermin and Sewercap left the band. Instead of hiring new members, vocalist Ben Weasel and guitarist John Jughead decided to break up Screeching Weasel. Weasel and Jughead formed the band the Gore Gore Girls shortly after and made one compilation appearance with the band in 1990. Screeching Weasel briefly reformed in early 1991 to play what was intended to be a one-off reunion show to pay back Russ Forster, who had loaned the band money to record Boogadaboogadaboogada!. After the show, Sewercap talked to Jughead about officially reuniting Screeching Weasel. Jughead liked the idea and the two approached Weasel about it. Although initially reluctant, Weasel agreed on the conditions that the band would begin playing more Ramones-influenced music and would not be called Screeching Weasel, which Sewercap and Jughead accepted. Vermin and guitarist Doug Ward were not interested in the reunion, so the other members hired Dan Sullivan ("Dan Panic") as their new drummer and Gore Gore Girls bassist Dave Lally ("Dave Naked") as their bassist. Sewercap would be renamed "Dan Vapid" and moved to rhythm guitar as Weasel wanted to continue focusing on singing. They decided to perform under the Gore Gore Girls name and began rehearsing for their first album.

== Recording ==
After recording a demo tape, Weasel sent it to Larry Livermore of Lookout Records to see if he was interested in releasing the band's album. Although Livermore liked the tape, he agreed to sign them only if they went under the name Screeching Weasel, explaining "it sounds like Screeching Weasel, why don't you just be Screeching Weasel? Why throw away all the publicity and credibility you've already built up?" Weasel relented and the group traveled to California in July to record the album at Art of Ears Studio in San Francisco with Livermore and Andy Ernst producing. Al Sobrante, former drummer for Green Day, is also credited as executive producer in the album's liner notes. Despite being credited as producer, Livermore has stated that "apart from offering a few suggestions, the main one of which, to take a little longer recording, was rejected as being 'too expensive', I was mainly a cheerleader." The album was recorded quickly in four days on July 2, 3, 8 and 9, 1991. During the sessions, the group re-recorded a number of older songs from its catalog, including "Slogans", "Kamala's Too Nice", "Fathead" and "I Wanna Be a Homosexual". Although the former three were put on the album, the latter was released along with other outtakes from the sessions on the Pervo Devo EP. While recording the title track, which was named in reference to the Monty Python's Flying Circus sketch "Gumby Brain Specialist", Weasel instructed Panic to play in the style of Aaron Cometbus of Crimpshrine during the drum break. However, it did not work out because, as Weasel said, Cometbus had "too much talent." "I mean no disrespect to Aaron, but sometimes talent is a hindrance", he stated. Livermore later remarked that it was "very impressive watching the band work" during the sessions, saying "They had every song totally figured out in advance, and just whipped through the 14 songs on the album and another three they were doing for a compilation [which were actually the songs on the Pervo Devo EP] in no time flat."

== Songwriting ==
Although the majority of the songs on My Brain Hurts were written by Weasel, as was the material on the band's previous albums, he also began collaborating more with Vapid and less with Jughead. The only song on the album to credit Jughead as co-writer is "Fathead", the original version of which previously appeared on the Punkhouse EP. In retrospect, Weasel would call Vapid the "only person with whom I felt comfortable writing songs."

The guitar lead for "Guest List" was originally written by Vapid for a Sludgeworth song, but it "just wasn't working", while the chorus "popped into my head" as he was driving through Roscoe Village in North Center, Chicago shortly before the band went to record the album. During a trip to Olympia, Washington, Vapid showed what he had written to Weasel, who combined the lead and the chorus idea into one song. Weasel also brought the lead up an octave, which was reportedly a "hat tip to local heroes Naked Raygun." Weasel wrote most of the lyrics to the song, but said that "'Now I get to watch her dance like the other weirdos do' was a line that only could've come from Vapid."

According to Vapid, "Veronica Hates Me" started as a play on the Material Issue song "Valerie Loves Me". "At the time, I guess we were harboring ill will towards their singer, Jim Ellison, for ripping us off at a show he promoted", Vapid stated. While writing the song, Weasel said he "tried to take the standard chords used in old rock 'n' roll and updated by the Ramones and twist them around a little bit." Weasel stated that when he started writing the song, he made a rule that he would not "go outside of the standard four chords used in that style of song." "At the break, I used a traditional arrangement to give the listener what I assumed what they would want after I'd held out for the majority of the song" he said. Despite not being co-written with Vapid, Weasel said that he wrote the song "with him in mind", explaining that "some of my best songs from this time came solely out of my desire to write songs that would impress him."

Weasel has stated he "had a blast arranging 'I Can See Clearly'", admitting that "it was the first time I'd done a decent arrangement of somebody else's song and I was very happy with the results." However, the group's arrangement did not include the bridge from the original. "Our version didn't really warrant a bridge, so I replaced it with the opening guitar lead, which then changed to a melodic lead for the last four bars", Weasel said.

"The Science of Myth" was partially inspired by the 1988 PBS documentary Joseph Campbell and the Power of Myth. Weasel stated that he "became interested in the application of spiritual beliefs" after watching it and tried to write and arrange the song in a style "favored by the type of punk band that would typically be writing anti-religion songs." He was also inspired by The Mr. T Experience song "The History of the Concept of the Soul", saying he "wanted to try to do something similar by writing what would look like the Cliff's Notes version of an essay and making it flow instead of writing it in the manner of a conventional rock lyric." Originally, Weasel debated not putting the song on the album, saying it seemed "a little out of place", but later decided to include it after it was recorded.

== Release, reception and influence ==
Professional ratings
Review scores
Source	Rating
AllMusic	4.5/5 stars

Mike DaRonco of AllMusic hailed it as "an album that would influence seemingly a million imitators." He called the album's sound "more mature" as opposed to the "angst-ridden thrash pop [they] were known for on their previous two records" and said the album "would eventually define the Screeching Weasel sound for the remainder of their careers."

== Track listing ==
All tracks are written by Ben Weasel, except where noted.

Side Look
No.	Title	Writer(s)	Length
1.	"Making You Cry"		1:35
2.	"Slogans"		1:38
3.	"Guest List"	Weasel; Dan Vapid	2:26
4.	"Veronica Hates Me"		2:52
5.	"I Can See Clearly"	Johnny Nash; arranged by Weasel	2:17
6.	"Cindy's on Methadone"		1:27
7.	"The Science of Myth"		2:24

Side Out
No.	Title	Writer(s)	Length
8.	"What We Hate"		2:26
9.	"Teenage Freakshow"	Weasel; Vapid	2:33
10.	"Kamala's Too Nice"	Weasel; Vapid	1:22
11.	"Don't Turn Out the Lights"		2:37
12.	"Fathead"	Weasel; Vapid; John Jughead	1:24
13.	"I Wanna Be with You Tonight"		1:52
14.	"My Brain Hurts"		3:09
Total length:			31:03

== Personnel ==
- Ben Weasel – lead vocals
- John Jughead – guitar
- Dan Vapid – guitar, backing vocals
- Dave Naked – bass
- Dan Panic – drums

Production

- Andy Ernst – producer, engineer
- Larry Livermore – producer
- Al Sobrante – executive producer
- Mass Giorgini – remastering
