= The Supersonic Storybook =

Studio album by Urge Overkill
- Released: 15 March 1991
- Genre: Alternative rock
- Length: 38:55
- Label: Touch and Go
- Producer: Steve Albini

Urge Overkill chronology
Americruiser (1990)	The Supersonic Storybook (1991)	Stull (1992)

The Supersonic Storybook is the third album by American alternative rock group Urge Overkill. It was released on March 15, 1991 on Touch and Go Records, and was produced by Steve Albini, a former roommate of the band. The album was named by Material Issue's Jim Ellison, who was a good friend of the band.

Professional ratings
Review scores
Source	Rating
Allmusic	4/5 stars
Chicago Tribune	3/4 stars
Robert Christgau	C
The Encyclopedia of Popular Music	3/5 stars
Spin	(favorable)

== Track listing ==
All songs written by Nash Kato and Eddie Roeser, except where noted.

1. "The Kids Are Insane"—2:55
2. "The Candidate"—5:00
3. "Today Is Blackie's Birthday"—3:18
4. "Emmaline" (Errol Brown, Tony Wilson) – 5:54
5. "Bionic Revolution"—4:03
6. "What Is Artane?"—3:48
7. "Vacation in Tokyo"—3:45
8. "Henhough: The Greatest Story Ever Told" (Nash Kato, Blackie Onassis) – 5:47
9. "Theme from Navajo"—4:25

== Personnel ==
- Eddie "King" Roeser – lead vocals, bass, guitars
- Nash Kato – guitars, vocals (lead: tracks 3–4 & 8; co-lead: track 1)
- Blackie Onassis – drums
