= Stull, Kansas =

- Unincorporated community
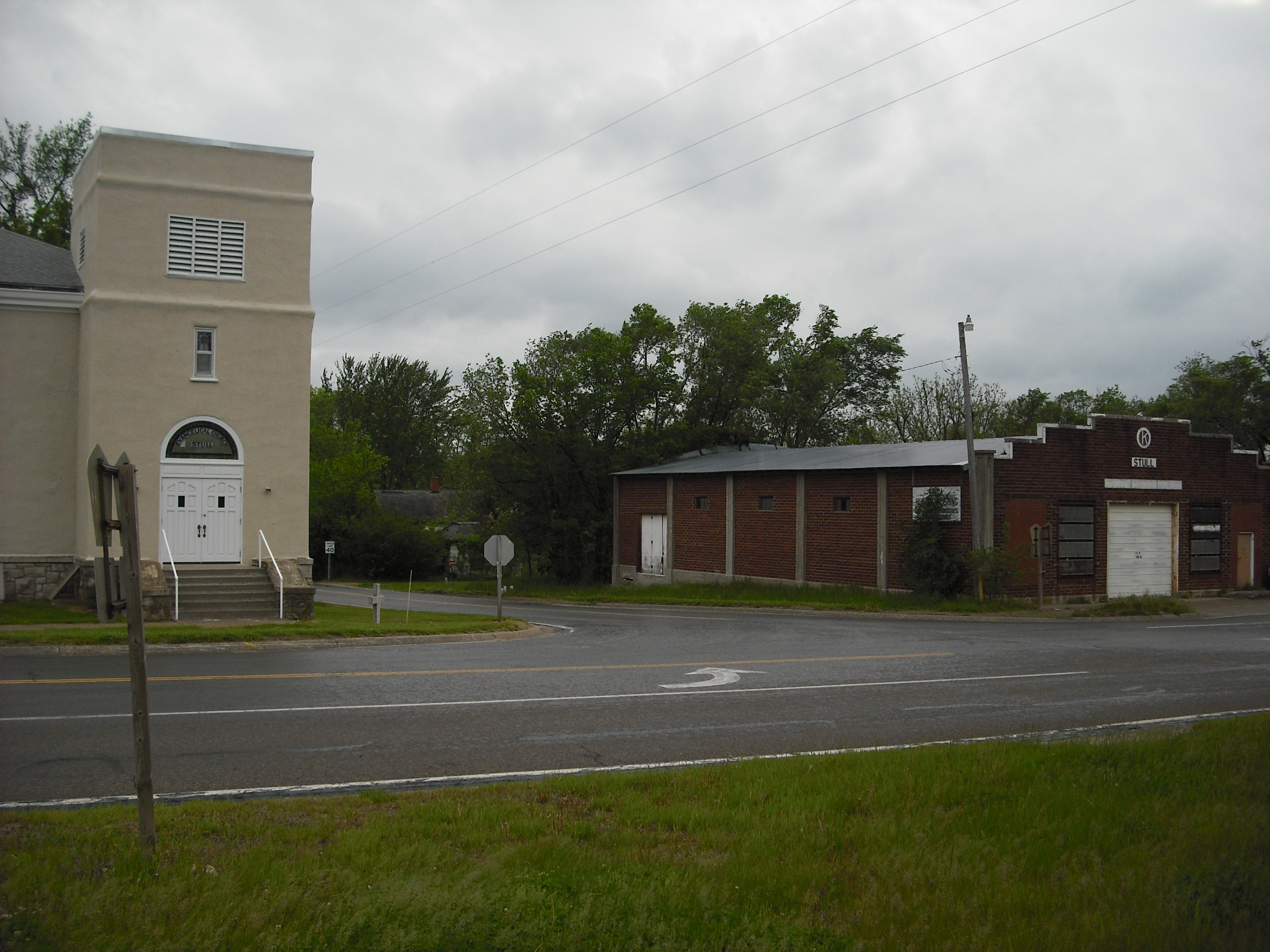
- A view of Stull looking southwest. The building on the left is the Stull United Methodist Church, and the building on the right is the fire station.

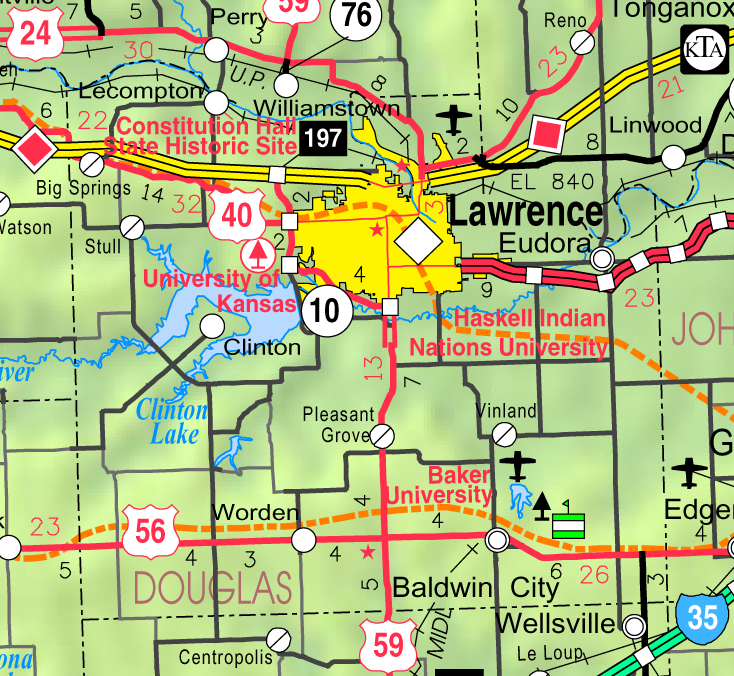
- KDOT map of Douglas County (legend)

- Location within Kansas Location within the United States
- Coordinates: 38°58′16″N 95°27′22″W
- Country: United States
- State: Kansas
- County: Douglas
- Founded: 1857
- Named for: Sylvester Stull
- Elevation: 942 ft (287 m)
- Time zone: UTC-6 (CST)
  - Summer (DST): UTC-5 (CDT)
- ZIP Code: 66050
- Area code: 785
- FIPS code: 20-68725
- GNIS ID: 479114

Stull is an unincorporated community in Douglas County, Kansas, United States. Founded in 1857, the settlement was initially known as Deer Creek by Pennsylvania Dutch settlers until it was renamed after its only postmaster, Sylvester Stull. As of 2018, only a handful of structures remain in the area.

Since the 1970s, the town has become infamous due to an apocryphal legend that claims the nearby Stull Cemetery is possessed by demonic forces. This legend has become a facet of American popular culture and has been referenced in numerous forms of media. This legend has also led to controversies with current residents of Stull.

== Geography ==
Stull is located at 38°58′16″N 95°27′32″W (38.9711124, -95.4560872), at the corner of North 1600 Road ( CR 442) and East 250 Road ( CR 1023) in Douglas County, which is 7 miles (11 km) west from the outskirts of Lawrence and 10 miles (16 km) east of the Topeka city limit.

== History ==
=== Founding ===
Stull first appeared on territorial maps in 1857. During this time, the settlement was called Deer Creek. It is unclear where this name came from, although Martha Parker and Betty Laird speculate that it could either be a translation of an indigenous location name or that it could have arisen after a deer was seen by a body of water. The first European settlers in the area spoke German as their native language. Some had come from Pennsylvania Dutch Country, whereas others had recently fled the German Confederation "for more freedom and to escape military duty."

=== 19th century ===
During the late 1850s, the handful of families living in Deer Creek organized a church that met in the homes of its members until 1867, when a stone structure named the Evangelical Emmanuel and Deer Creek Mission was built; this church later became known simply as "Evangelical Emmanuel Church". Until 1908, the sermons at the small chapel were preached in German. In 1867, a cemetery was chartered for the town next to the church. (Note: This cemetery is not to be confused with Mound View Cemetery, also known as "Old Stull Cemetery", which is located just south of the small town. Some people claim that this is the 'real' Stull Cemetery to which the notorious legends allude, but this seems to be a recent addition to the legend.) In 1922, those living in Stull raised $20,000 to construct a new, wooden-framed church across the road. The following year, the church changed its official name from "Deer Creek Church" to "Stull Evangelical Church". The old stone Evangelical Emmanuel Church was abandoned by the community in 1922, and over the 20th century, the church slowly fell into a greater and greater state of decrepitude, finally being demolished in 2002. (Note: In the 1990s, the structure's lost its roof during a microburst. By the turn of the 21st century, the eastern wall of the church ruin had buckled after years of neglect, and in early 2002, the structure's western wall caved in following another strong windstorm. In March of that year, the building was bulldozed. Initially, locals were unsure who had approved the razing, but it was eventually revealed that John Haase, a Lecompton resident who owned the land upon where the church was located, had authorized the demolition after the Douglas County sheriff's department informed him that it was a safety risk. Prior to the structure's collapse, some of the residents in Stull wanted to rebuild the stone church, although these efforts never materialized.) Due to a growing congregation from Stull and Lecompton, a larger church was eventually needed, so in 1919, the community voted to build a new church. In 1922 a new church was built and eventually got the name "United Methodist Zion Church" in 1968. This new church holds services and meetings that continue today under the name Stull United Methodist Church.

In the late 1890s, a telephone switchboard was added to the house of a Stull resident named J. E. Louk, and soon thereafter, on April 27, 1899, a post office was established in the back of the very same building. The town's first and only postmaster was Sylvester Stull, from whom the town derived its name. According to Parker and Laird, the United States Post Office simply selected the name based on the name of the postmaster. The name stuck even after the post office was discontinued in 1903.

Stull residents opened two schools before Kansas was admitted to the Union. The first school only lasted for about five years, the other school named "Deer Creek" experienced increasing enrollments and started being used for church services by the Lutheran congregation and the United Brethren on Sundays. Along with church services, the school held debates, voting for general elections, and competitions in baseball, horseshoes, sewing, and cooking. The school continued until 1962 when it closed; students thereafter went to Lecompton to continue their education.

Farming brought the community new hope and continues to be the common livelihood of the remaining residents. Construction on the Clinton Reservoir led to changes in road routes and farming locations. While this did mean the loss of farms to eminent domain and county purchase, it helped Stull and its surrounding communities become more progressive.

=== 20th century ===
In 1912, only 31 people lived in the Stull area, and at its maximum size, the settlement comprised about 50 individuals. Christ Kraft, an inhabitant of the settlement during the 20th century, recalls that life in the small town was "quiet and easy, sometimes even boring." Before automobiles were popular in the area, trips to Lecompton, Lawrence, and Topeka, took two, three, and four hours, respectively. In the early 20th century, organized baseball became popular in the area, and members of Stull played in a league with members from other Clinton Lake communities, like Clinton and Lone Star. Eventually, a baseball diamond was constructed in Stull. During this time, hunting rabbits was also a popular activity, and it was not uncommon for the Stull community to bring hauls of about 300 freshly killed rabbits to butchers in Topeka.

During the early 20th century, a number of businesses were established in the area, but most were short-lived; the exception to this general trend was the Louk & Kraft grocery store, which was established in the early 1900s and lasted until 1955. The Roaring Twenties brought preliminary discussion about constructing an interurban railroad line between Kansas City and Emporia that would have run through Stull. Anticipating that their city was about to grow, the residents of Stull began discussing the idea of establishing a "Farmers State Bank" in the area; the Lecompton-based banker J. W. Kreider even secured an official bank charter. However, neither the railway or the bank were ever built, possibly due to the advent of the Great Depression.

During the 20th century, the settlement suffered two major tragedies. The first occurred when Oliver Bahnmaier, a young boy wandered into a field that his father was burning and died. Oliver's tragic death led to the rumor that if one stepped on Oliver's tombstone, they would go to Hell. The second occurred when a man was found hanging from a tree after going missing.

=== 21st century ===
On July 25, 2022, the new Stull church mysteriously caught fire between 1 p.m. and 1:30 p.m.. No injuries were reported but there was substantial damage to the building and fear that the bell may fall. According to WIBW, officials have hypothesized that the fire was caused by a lightning strike.

Due to vandalism, the Stull Cemetery is locked at night and the area is patrolled by law enforcement personnel. Trespassing can result in six months of jail time or a fine of up to $1000.

== Legend of Stull Cemetery ==
Far removed from the horrible story of The Exorcist or the bizarre black masses recently discovered in Los Angeles, and tucked away on a rough county road between Topeka and Lawrence is the tiny town of Stull. Not unlike the town of Sleepy Hollow, described by Washington Irving in his famous tale, Stull is one of those towns motorists can miss by blinking. Stull and Sleepy Hollow have another thing in common. Both are haunted by legends of diabolical, supernatural happenings.

— The opening to the University Daily Kansan article "Legend of Devil Haunts Tiny Town", penned by Jain Penner. It was this article that caused Stull to largely be associated with the supernatural in the popular consciousness.

The Stull Cemetery has gained an ominous reputation due to urban legends involving Satan, the occult, and a purported "gateway to Hell". The rumors about the cemetery were popularized by a November 1974 issue of The University Daily Kansan (the student newspaper of the University of Kansas), which claimed that the Devil appeared in Stull twice a year: once on Halloween, and once on the spring equinox. People soon said that the cemetery was the location of one of the seven gates to Hell and that the nearby Evangelical Emmanuel Church ruin was "possessed" by the Devil. Others claimed (erroneously) that the legend was engendered by the killing of Stull's mayor back in the 1850s (of note, Stull was never organized as a town, and so never had a mayor). It is also said that during a trip to Colorado in the 1990s, Pope John Paul II redirected the flight path of his private plane to avoid flying over the unholy ground of Stull (although there is no evidence that this happened).

However, most academics, historians, and local residents are in agreement that the legend has no basis in historical fact and was created and spread by students. "Folks swear an old tree in the graveyard once served as gallows for condemned witches who return each year as Satan's army. [...] But it is the cemetery that is most feared, for they say it is Beelzebub's gate. The voices of the dead will strangle you while evil spirits carve out your innards". "They say that in the basement of the abandoned church in Stull, Kansas, there is a staircase. And if you follow that staircase, down, down, down, you will reach the entrance to hell, itself. And if you can crawl your way back up that ladder, escape from the bowels of hell to reach the surface, you will have to climb for weeks. That is... if the devil does not grab you first. [...] They say on the night before Halloween, a woman in a white dress lures drivers to their death along the highway's edge, never to be seen again".

In the years that followed the publication of the University Daily Kansan article, the legend persuaded thrill seekers to visit the cemetery, and they would claim that weird and creepy events such as noises and memory lapses happened to them, leading to further speculation that the town was haunted by witches and the devil. It became a popular activity for young folks (especially high school and college students from Lawrence or Topeka) to journey to the cemetery on Halloween or the equinox to "see the Devil". Many would jump fences or otherwise sneak their way onto the property. Over the decades, as the number of people making excursions to the cemetery grew, the graveyard started to deteriorate; this was exacerbated by vandals. To combat this, the county's sheriff office patrols the area around the cemetery, especially on Halloween, and will arrest people for trespassing. Those caught inside the cemetery after it is closed could face a maximum fine of $1,000 and up to six months in jail.

=== In popular culture ===
Despite its dubious origins, the legend of Stull Cemetery has been referenced numerous times in culture. The band Urge Overkill released Stull in 1992, which features the church and a tombstone from the cemetery on the cover. It has been argued that the British band The Cure canceled their show in Kansas because of Stull's cemetery, although this is false. Films whose plot is based on the legends include Turbulence 3: Heavy Metal (2001), Nothing Left to Fear (2013), and the unreleased film Sin-Jin Smyth. The cemetery is also the site of the final confrontation between Lucifer and Michael in "Swan Song", the season five finale of the television series Supernatural. In-universe, Sam and Dean Winchester (the series' protagonists) are from Lawrence; in a 2006 interview, Eric Kripke (the creator of Supernatural) revealed that he decided to have the two brothers be from Lawrence because of its closeness to Stull.

== Gallery ==
Stull Kanwaka Fire Station-2 in 2026

Stull United Methodist Church, a.k.a. Stull Community of Faith, in 2026

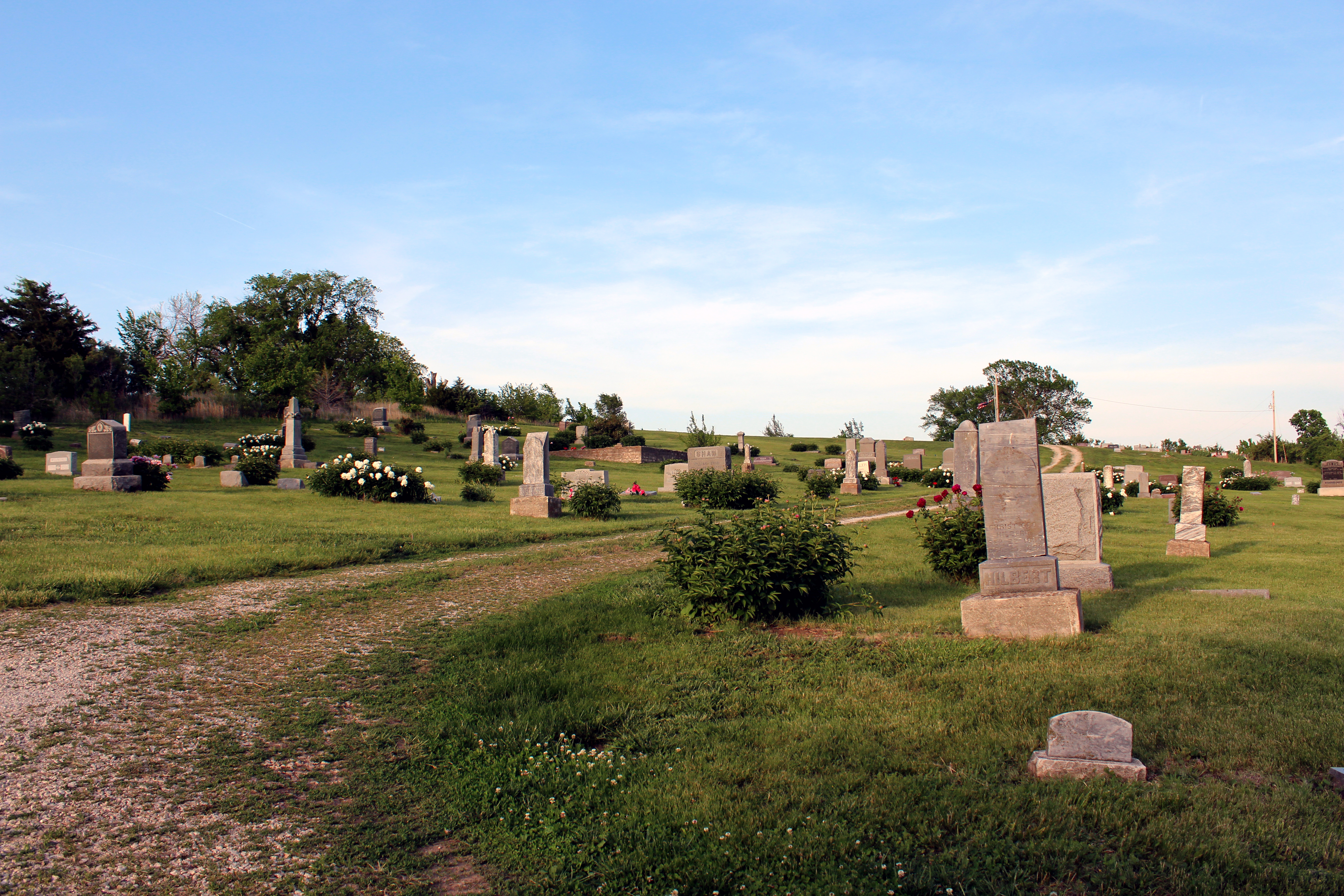
Stull Cemetery (facing northeast) in 2014

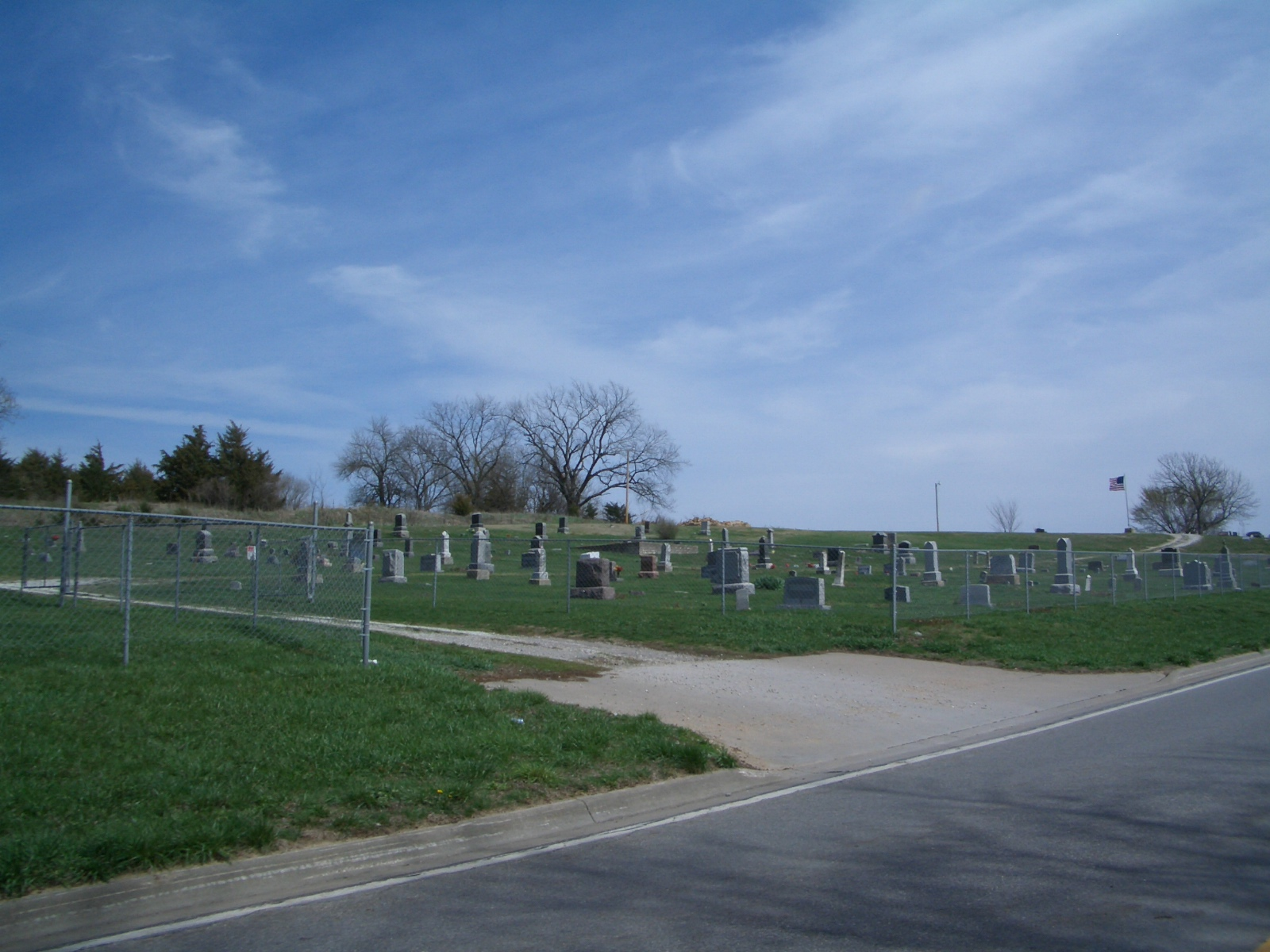
Stull Cemetery (facing northeast) in 2007. The remnants of the old church are visible in the background.

Cover of Stull by Urge Overkill. The now-destroyed chapel is in the background.

== See also ==
- Kanwaka Township, Douglas County, Kansas (location of Stull)
- Clinton Lake, southeast of Stull
- List of reportedly haunted locations in the United States
