= Telecommando Americano =

Studio album by Material Issue
- Released: 1997
- Genre: Power pop
- Label: Rykodisc

Material Issue chronology
Goin' Through Your Purse: Live (1994)	Telecommando Americano (1997)

Telecommando Americano is an album by the American band Material Issue, released in 1997, one year after frontman Jim Ellison's suicide. It was the band's fourth album. The band's debut six-song EP, released on vinyl in 1987, was included with the album.

== Production ==
The songs originated as voice/guitar demos by Ellison and were finished by his bandmates; they were recorded in 1995 and 1996. They are not autobiographical, as Ellison was not a fan of confessional songwriting. "(0.15)", the final song, is 15 seconds of intentionally recorded silence. "Carousel" is a ballad. "Off the Hook" employs the busy signal of a phone line as its rhythmic foundation.

== Critical reception ==
Professional ratings
Review scores
Source	Rating
AllMusic	3/5 stars
Chicago Sun-Times	3.5/4 stars
The Encyclopedia of Popular Music	3/5 stars
MusicHound Rock: The Essential Album Guide	3/5 stars
The Philadelphia Inquirer	2.5/4 stars
The Plain Dealer	B

Dallas Observer wrote that Material Issue's "mix of plaintive post-adolescent longing (and anger), rock convention, and snappy songcraft reflected the pop ideals kept alive by New Wave into yet another decade while preserving the bleeding heart of an earlier era." Phoenix New Times opined: "If the power-pop crowd needs its Layla and Other Assorted Love Songs to wallow in, this is surely it."

The Chicago Tribune called the album "a top-down, crank-the-amps blend of three-minute rockers and equally terse, heart-crushing ballads that reaffirms Material Issue's stature as among the best things to happen to Midwest power-pop since the 1970s heyday of Cheap Trick and the Raspberries." The Chicago Sun-Times deemed it "a strong, fitting close to the band's all too short legacy of perfect pop songs."

AllMusic wrote: "No matter how good these are, there's a sense that Ellison took his life before he reached his full potential, and that's really what makes Telecommando Americano so sad—he had the gift, but he hadn't completely mastered it yet." The A.V. Club noted that, "as hopes of stardom faded, the darkness increasingly came to the fore."

== Track listing ==
No.	Title	Length
1.	"Satellite"
2.	"What If I Killed Your Boyfriend"
3.	"2 Steps"
4.	"976-Love"
5.	"Young American Freak"
6.	"Carousel"
7.	"London Girl"
8.	"You Were Beautiful"
9.	"Our Daughter"
10.	"Head Shop"
11.	"Off the Hook"
12.	"(0.15)"
