= Midway Pictures =

Midway Pictures is a documentary film production company based in Providence, Rhode Island founded by filmmaker David Bettencourt. The first Midway Pictures documentary, You Must Be This Tall: The Story of Rocky Point Park, received five stars from the Providence Journal when it was released in 2007.

Other films produced by Midway Pictures include the documentaries On the Lake: Life and Love in a Distant Place, which was nominated for a 2009 regional Emmy Award, and It's a Bash. Midway Pictures is currently in production on a documentary called What We Hate, about the Chicago, IL punk rock band Screeching Weasel.
