= Freak City =

Freak City may refer to:

- "Freak City", a 2010 episode of the TV series Adventure Time
- Freak City Soundtrack, the third studio album by Material Issue, released in 1994
- Freak City, 1999 Showtime original film nominated for the 52nd Writers Guild of America Awards
