= Urge Overkill =

American rock band

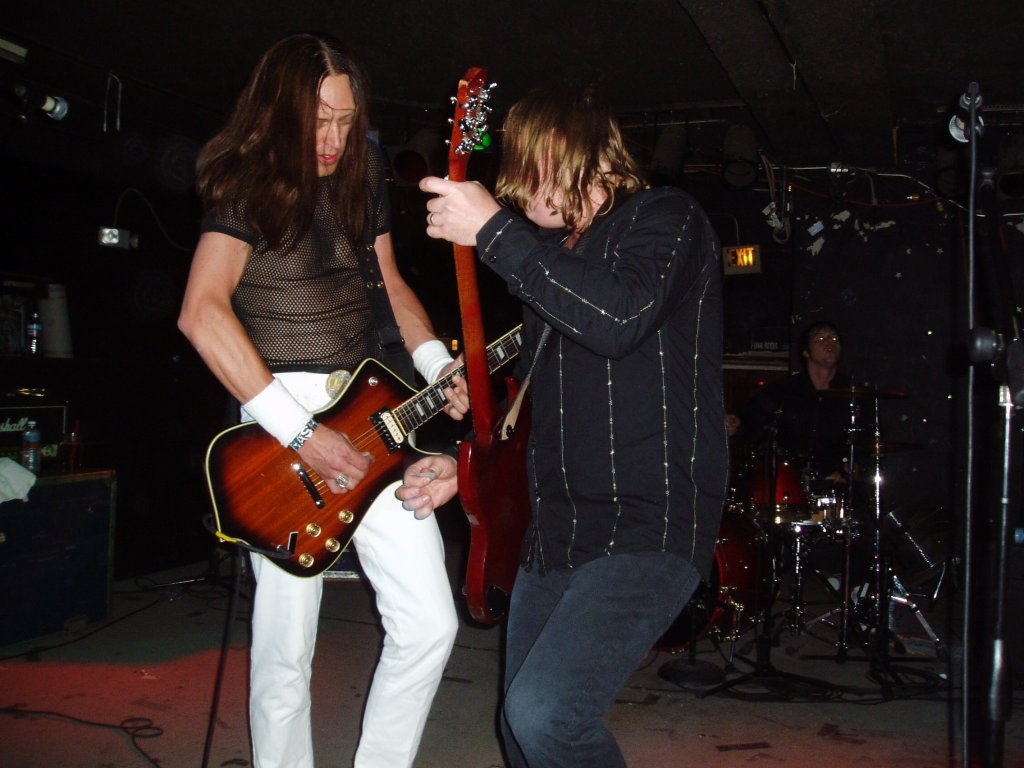
- Urge Overkill performing in 2004

Background information
- Origin: Chicago, Illinois, United States
- Genres: Alternative rock, hard rock
- Years active: 1986–1997, 2004–present
- Labels: Ruthless, Touch and Go, Geffen
- Members: Nash Kato; Eddie "King" Roeser; Nate Arling; Adam Arling
- Past members: Johnny "Blackie Onassis" Rowan; Chris Frantisak; Mike "Hadji" Hodgkiss; Patrick Byrne; Jack "Jaguar" Watt; Kriss Bataille; Chuck Treece; Nils St. Cyr; Bonn Quast
- Website: www.urgeoverkill.com

Urge Overkill is an American alternative rock band, formed in Chicago in 1986, consisting of Nathan Kaatrud, who took the stage name Nash Kato (vocals/guitar), and Eddie "King" Roeser (vocals/guitar/bass). They are widely known for their song "Sister Havana" and their cover of Neil Diamond's "Girl, You'll Be a Woman Soon", which was used in Quentin Tarantino's Pulp Fiction. Oui, their latest album, was released in 2022.

== History ==
=== Formation, Jesus Urge Superstar, and Americruiser (1986–1990) ===
Kato and Roeser met at Northwestern University in 1985. They formed Urge Overkill (getting the name from a phrase in the lyrics of the Parliament song "Funkentelechy") in Chicago in 1986, with drummer Pat Byrne, and released an EP, Strange, I..., on Ruthless Records. The EP was recorded by Kato's friend Steve Albini. The full-length album Jesus Urge Superstar soon followed, again produced by Albini, and with Kriss Bataille on the drums.

Americruiser saw a change in style. Jack "Jaguar" Watt (of the band Baron Lesh) was the drummer and their sound from then on has been described as a "Stonesy fusion of arena rock and punk". Produced by Butch Vig, Americruiser was widely praised, and scored a college radio hit with the lead single "Ticket to L.A."

=== The Supersonic Storybook and Saturation (1991–1994) ===
Watt returned to Baron Lesh and was replaced by Blackie Onassis (real name: John Rowan) on the next album The Supersonic Storybook, which was named by Material Issue's Jim Ellison and was released in 1991.

After opening for Nirvana on the American Nevermind tour, Urge Overkill returned to the studio to record another EP Stull in 1992, which featured the tracks "Girl, You'll Be a Woman Soon" (produced and mixed by Kramer) and "Goodbye to Guyville". Having a strong following by this time, they jumped from their indie label Touch & Go to Geffen Records. Despite some criticism for the label switch, Urge Overkill's major-label debut Saturation received strong reviews upon release in 1993, and to support the album, they opened for Pearl Jam on their Vs. tour. The single "Sister Havana" gave the band a hit record and broad recognition.

In 1993, the band contributed the track "Take a Walk" to the AIDS relief benefit album No Alternative produced by the Red Hot Organization. As the band recorded a follow-up album, cult filmmaker Quentin Tarantino used the group's cover version of the Neil Diamond song "Girl, You'll Be a Woman Soon" in his 1994 film Pulp Fiction. When the movie became a hit, the song made it to number 59 on the Billboard Hot 100.

=== Exit the Dragon, hiatus, and reformation (1995–2009) ===
Urge Overkill retained their sound for Exit the Dragon, released in 1995. Kato and Roeser started feuding, resulting in Roeser leaving the band. Roeser went on to perform with Jim Kimball (formerly of The Jesus Lizard) as L.I.M.E. and with his brother John in the band Electric Airlines. Now a duo consisting of Kato and Onassis, Urge Overkill moved to Sony's 550 Music in early 1997.

After a break of several years, Kato released a solo album in 2000 titled Debutante. Six of the album's 13 songs were co-written with Onassis.

In 2004, Kato and Roeser reformed Urge Overkill without Onassis, recruiting former Gaza Strippers guitarist Mike "Hadji" Hodgkiss to play bass, keyboardist Chris Frantisak, and drummer Nate Arling. The reformed Urge Overkill performed shows at The Troubadour in West Hollywood, Double Door in Chicago, First Avenue in Minneapolis and the Bowery Ballroom in New York and continued to tour through Europe, North America, and Australia.

=== Rock & Roll Submarine and Oui (2010–present) ===
On September 19, 2010, on the free form radio program Anything Anything with Rich Russo on WRXP-FM in New York, the first new Urge Overkill song in 15 years was played. The song was called "Effigy". Russo also announced an Urge Overkill show on October 4, 2010 at Mercury Lounge in New York. Live shows began happening, including being the musical guest at a "Roast of Quentin Tarantino" on December 1, 2010. The band released Rock & Roll Submarine, their first studio album in 16 years, in May 2011. A subsequent tour followed the release of the album. On October 8, 2011, Urge Overkill opened for Weezer at the Red Bull Riot Fest at the Congress Theater in Chicago.

Urge Overkill had continued to perform live occasionally from 2012 to 2018. By 2019, the band had begun working on new material for the follow-up to Rock & Roll Submarine. Oui, their first studio album in 11 years, was released on January 28, 2022. Johnny "Blackie Onassis" Rowan died on 13 June 2023, at the age of 57.

== Musical style and influences ==
Urge Overkill's musical style has been described as alternative rock and hard rock. Some of the band's influences include T. Rex, Kiss, and the Cars.

== Band members ==
Current members

- Nash Kato – vocals, guitar
- Eddie "King" Roeser – vocals, guitar
- Nate Arling – drums
- Adam Arling – bass

Former members

- Pat Byrne – drums
- Kriss Bataille – drums
- Jack "Jaguar" Watt – drums
- John "Blackie Onassis" Rowan – drums
- Mike "Hadji" Hodgkiss – bass
- Chuck Treece – bass
- Chris Frantisak – keyboards
- Nils St. Cyr – guitar
- Bonn Quast – drums

== Discography ==
=== Studio albums ===
Year	Title	Label	Peak chart positions			
Year	Title	Label	US	AUS	NZ	UK
1989	Jesus Urge Superstar	Touch and Go	—	—	—	—
1990	Americruiser	Touch and Go	—	—	—	—
1991	The Supersonic Storybook	Touch and Go	—	—	—	—
1993	Saturation	Geffen	146	16	—	—
1995	Exit the Dragon	Geffen	129	6	50	88
2011	Rock & Roll Submarine	UO	—	—	—	—
2022	Oui	Omnivore Recordings	—	—	—	—

=== Extended plays ===
Year	Title	Label
1986	Strange, I...	Ruthless
1992	Stull	Touch and Go

=== Live albums ===
Year	Title	Label
2004	Live at Maxwells 2/5/04	eMusicLive

=== Compilation albums ===
Year	Title	Label
1992	The Urge Overkill Story	Shagpile
1993	The Urge Overkill Story...Stay Tuned: 1988–1991	Touch and Go
2012	Icon	Universal

=== Singles ===
Year	Title	Peak chart positions						Album
Year	Title	US	US Alt.	US Main	AUS	NZ	UK	Album
1987	"Lineman"	—	—	—	—	—	—	Non-album single
1990	"Ticket to L.A."	—	—	—	—	—	—	Americruiser
1991	"Now That's the Barclords"	—	—	—	—	—	—	Non-album single
1993	"Sister Havana"	—	6	10	104	—	67	Saturation
1993	"Dropout"	—	—	—	103	—	—	Saturation
1993	"Bottle of Fur"	—	—	—	—	—	—	Saturation
1993	"Positive Bleeding"	—	23	40	61	—	61	Saturation
1994	"Girl, You'll Be a Woman Soon"	59	11	—	21	19	37	Music from the Motion Picture Pulp Fiction
1995	"The Break"	—	—	34	114	—	—	Exit the Dragon
1995	"View of the Rain"	—	—	—	151	—	—	Exit the Dragon
1995	"Somebody Else's Body"	—	—	—	47	—	—	Exit the Dragon
2011	"Effigy"	—	—	—	—	—	—	Rock & Roll Submarine

=== Compilation appearances ===
- Hog Butcher For The World (Mad Queen Records) (1987) - "Last Train To Heaven"
- Mondostereo (Away From the Pulsebeat) (1988) - with Killdozer, credited as "Urgeoverkilldozer" - "Evil Womyn"

== See also ==
- List of alternative rock artists
