= Schadenfreude (disambiguation) =

Schadenfreude is an emotion of pleasure from the misfortune of others

Schadenfreude may also refer to:

- Schadenfreude (album), a 2020 album by Shiner
- Schadenfreude (EP), a 1989 EP by Lubricated Goat
- "Schadenfreude", a song from the musical Avenue Q
- "Schadenfreude" (샤덴프로이데), a song from the original soundtrack of the first season of The Penthouse: War in Life
- "Schadenfreude", the second episode of the second season of Boston Legal
- "Schadenfreude", the seventeenth episode of the second season of Cold Case

== See also ==
- Carnival of Schadenfreude, a 2011 EP by Screeching Weasel
