= Saturation (Urge Overkill album) =

Studio album by Urge Overkill
- Released: June 8, 1993
- Recorded: December 17, 1992–January 9, 1993
- Genre: Alternative rock
- Length: 42:43
- Label: Geffen
- Producers: Butcher Bros., Andy Kravitz

Urge Overkill chronology
Stull (1992)	Saturation (1993)	Exit the Dragon (1995)

Singles from Album
- 1. "Sister Havana" Released: 1993; 2. "Dropout" Released: 1993; 3. "Bottle of Fur" Released: 1993; 4. "Positive Bleeding" Released: 1993

Professional ratings
Review scores
Source	Rating
AllMusic	5/5 stars
Chicago Sun-Times	4/4 stars
Encyclopedia of Popular Music	4/5 stars
Entertainment Weekly	B+
The Philadelphia Inquirer	4/4 stars
Q	3/5 stars
Rolling Stone	3.5/5 stars
The Rolling Stone Album Guide	4/5 stars
Select	4/5
Spin Alternative Record Guide	8/10

Saturation is the fourth album by American alternative rock group Urge Overkill, released in 1993 and produced by the Butcher Bros. Saturation was Urge Overkill's debut on Geffen Records, and a deliberate attempt at a hit record. The label released "Sister Havana" and "Positive Bleeding" as singles in the US and Europe. "Sister Havana" charted highly on both the modern rock and mainstream rock charts, peaking at numbers 6 and 10, respectively, while "Positive Bleeding" became a minor rock radio hit. As of 2013, Saturation has sold 277,000 copies in the US, according to Nielsen Soundscan.

On release, Saturation was met with critical acclaim. It was praised by critics for its musical variety, surreal lyrical themes, and unusual and timeless sound and production style. The album is also notable for the fact that Nash Kato – rather than King Roeser, the band's usual de facto lead vocalist – sings lead on almost the entire album. The two would split frontman duties on their next album Exit the Dragon and their 2011 comeback Rock & Roll Submarine.

At the end of "Erica Kane", a piece of dialogue by McGarrett from Hawaii Five-O is played before the music starts. The quote is from Season 5, Episode 6, titled "Fools Die Twice".

The graphic art for the album cover by Robert Fisher is an artistic depiction of the Houston, Texas city skyline.

== Track listing ==
1. "Sister Havana" – 3:53
2. "Tequila Sundae" – 4:20
3. "Positive Bleeding" – 3:44
4. "Back on Me" – 3:12
5. "Woman 2 Woman" – 2:40
6. "Bottle of Fur" – 4:13
7. "Crackbabies" – 4:03
8. "The Stalker" – 2:52
9. "Dropout" – 4:55
10. "Erica Kane" – 3:07
11. "Nite and Grey" – 4:22
12. "Heaven 90210" – 3:50

CD bonus track: "Operation Kissinger" (hidden track) – 4:31

== Personnel ==
- Nash Kato – lead vocals, guitars, keyboards
- Eddie "King" Roeser – bass guitar, guitars, vocals (lead: tracks 4, 8, and 11; co-lead: track 2)
- Blackie Onassis – drums, lead vocals (track 9)

== Charts ==
Chart (1993–1994)	Peak position
Australian Albums (ARIA)	16
US Billboard 200	146
