= Storm the Streets =

Studio album by Riverdales
- Released: July 29, 1997
- Recorded: January 6–11, 1997 at Uber Studios in Chicago
- Genre: Punk rock
- Length: 34:11
- Label: Honest Don's, Fat Wreck Chords
- Producer: Mass Giorgini, Ben Foster

Riverdales chronology
Riverdales (1995)	Storm the Streets (1997)	Phase Three (2003)

Professional ratings
Review scores
Source	Rating
AllMusic	3/5 stars

Storm the Streets is the second studio album by the American punk rock band the Riverdales. After a dispute with Lookout! Records, the band signed to Honest Don's Records for this release. It is the only Riverdales album still available from its original label. In the liner notes to Screeching Weasel's Thank You Very Little, Ben Weasel refers to Storm the Streets as a "gem" but admits that the record sold far less than its predecessor, Riverdales. The band broke up after the album's release until they reunited in 2003 to record and release Phase Three. "I Accuse My Parents" most likely takes its title from a movie of the same name which was featured on Mystery Science Theater 3000, a television show mentioned in the song "I Think About You During the Commercials" from the Riverdales' debut album. The album was mixed from February 24–27, 1997 by Mass Giorgini at Sonic Iguana Studios in Lafayette, Indiana.

Storm the Streets was remastered and reissued in 2011 on Fat Wreck Chords.

== Track listing ==
All songs written by Ben Foster and Dan Schafer.

1. "Make Way" - 1:58
2. "Mental Retard" - 2:51
3. "Don't Let Them Beat My Baby" - 2:32
4. "Cementhead" - 1:43
5. "Riverdale Stomp" - 2:14
6. "Dyna-Mole" - 2:12
7. "I Will Make It Up to You" - 3:08
8. "Blood on the Ice" - 2:09
9. "I Don't Wanna Go to the Party" - 2:20
10. "Kick Your Head In" - 2:55
11. "I Accuse My Parents" - 2:24
12. "Boy in the Plastic Bubble" - 1:50
13. "Give It Up" - 2:15
14. "I Am Not a Freak" - 1:28

== Personnel ==
Riverdales

- Ben Foster - guitar, lead vocals
- Dan Schafer - bass, lead vocals
- Dan Sullivan - drums, backing vocals

Production

- Mass Giorgini - producer, engineer
- Ben Foster - producer
- Tom Baker - mastering
- Tim Carlson - band portrait
- Fryderyk Garbowicz - photography
