= Screeching Weasel (album) =

- Original Underdog cover

Studio album by Screeching Weasel
- Released: September 1987
- Recorded: June 13, 1987
- Studio: Solid Sound Studio in Hoffman Estates, Illinois
- Genre: Hardcore punk
- Length: 34:12; 56:42 (reissue)
- Label: Underdog (#3); VML (072)
- Producer: Phil Bonnet

Screeching Weasel chronology
Screeching Weasel (1987)	Boogadaboogadaboogada! (1988)

Screeching Weasel is the debut studio album by the Chicago-based punk rock band Screeching Weasel. It was originally released on vinyl with a limited pressing of 1,000 copies in September 1987 through local independent label Underdog Records and was the band's only album with bassist Vinnie Bovine, who was fired the next year. Screeching Weasel documents the group's early years as a hardcore punk band, with the music being heavily influenced by bands such as Adrenalin O.D., Angry Samoans, Circle Jerks and Black Flag.

The album gained the band a minor local following and its initial pressing sold out quickly. However, Underdog decided not to repress the album to save money for a release by label owner Russ Forster's own band Spongetunnel. With no other label interested in repressing it, Screeching Weasel went out of print for the next decade until VML Records re-released the album on CD in 1997. The CD version was remastered by Mass Giorgini and featured a full-color version of the album art as well as several previously unreleased bonus tracks.

== Background ==
The band was formed as All-Night Garage Sale by Ben Foster (later taking the stage name "Ben Weasel") and John Pierson ("John Jughead") in Prospect Heights, Illinois in 1986, changing their name to Screeching Weasel shortly after. Weasel took singing/bass duties, Jughead became the guitarist and Steve Dubick ("Steve Cheese") was hired as the drummer. However, Weasel would find it too difficult to sing and play bass simultaneously, so the group hired Vince Vogel (rechristened "Vinnie Bovine") as their bassist in November.

Weasel then began looking up studios in the phone book to record the band's first demo, settling on Solid Sound in Hoffman Estates as engineer Phil Bonnet "didn't laugh when I told him we were a punk band." Bonnet loaned the band $200 and booked the band to come into the studio, which was delayed two weeks because Bonnet did not show up for the first session nor the rescheduled session the next week. As an apology, Bonnet let them record on the studio's 24-track machine for the same price as the 12-track machine when he finally arrived to the third session a week later on January 10, 1987. For the demo, the group did a number of songs that would later be re-recorded for their debut album, which were reportedly written by Weasel during his stay at a drug rehabilitation center in Maine when he was a teenager. The tape was self-released shortly after and sold through Berkeley, California punk-zine Maximumrocknroll for a short period. After the band played a show at the Batteries Not Included club in Chicago, they met Russ Forster, president of local independent label Underdog Records. Forster made an offer to the band to release an album by them on his label, which they accepted.

== Release and reception ==
Professional ratings
Review scores
Source	Rating
AllMusic	3/5 stars
New Musical Express	10/10

Screeching Weasel was released on vinyl in September 1987 with a limited pressing of 1,000 copies on Underdog Records as the label's third release. After BBC Radio 1 DJ John Peel played the song "Murder in the Brady House" on his radio show, the group got an overseas deal with What Goes On? Records, who released the album in the UK with a pressing of 2,000 copies.

In the United States, the band gained a minor local following after the album's release and its initial pressing sold out in three months. Underdog opted not to repress the album, however, as Forster wanted to save money to release a record by his own band Spongetunnel. Forster gave the band $200 along with the master tapes and all the rights to the album for their trouble and the group began looking for another label to release it, but none were interested. It remained out of print for the next decade, due to Weasel's dissatisfaction with the album and because Bovine allegedly wanted too much money for it. In 1997, the album was remastered by Mass Giorgini (the band's bassist at the time) and finally re-released on CD by VML Records. The reissue featured a new, fully colored version of the cover art and several bonus tracks, including songs from the band's first demo, early versions of tracks from their next album Boogadaboogadaboogada!, an unreleased split EP with local band The Ozzfish Experience and other outtakes from the era.

== Track listing ==
All tracks are written by Ben Weasel, except where noted.

Side Screech
No.	Title	Length
1.	"Say No! to Authority"	0:55
2.	"Wanna Die" (music by Screeching Weasel)	1:03
3.	"Society"	1:22
4.	"California Sucks" (music by John Jughead)	0:44
5.	"Murder in the Brady House"	2:18
6.	"I Can't Stand Myself"	0:42
7.	"My Song"	1:51
8.	"High Ambitions" (music by Jughead and Vinnie Bovine)	0:57
9.	"March of the Lawnmowers"	0:58
10.	"Leave Me Alone" (music by Jughead)	1:36
11.	"Don't Touch My Car" (lyrics by Jughead)	0:53
12.	"7-11"	1:15
13.	"Cows"	1:11

Side Moo
No.	Title	Length
14.	"Work"	1:27
15.	"Wavin Gerbs" (lyrics by Dave Robinson; music by Bovine)	1:08
16.	"Liar"	0:56
17.	"O.M.W." (cover of the Oscar Mayer theme song; arranged by Steve Cheese)	0:48
18.	"Clean-Cut Asshole" (music by Jughead)	1:18
19.	"Raining Needles" (lyrics by Robinson)	0:26
20.	"BPD" (music by Jughead)	1:26
21.	"Experience the Ozzfish"	1:45
22.	"Jockpunk"	1:37
23.	"K-Mart Blues" (lyrics by Cheese)	0:56
24.	"Bates Motel" (music by Jughead)	1:12
25.	"Hardcore Hippie" (music by Jughead)	0:40
26.	"What Is Right?"	2:30
27.	"Yeah Baby!" (music by Jughead)	2:07
Total length:		34:12

CD bonus tracks
No.	Title	Original appearance	Length
28.	"In the Hospital"	Screeching Weasel demo (1987) / Blame and Burn compilation (1991)	1:49
29.	"I Feel Like Shit" (music by Jughead)	Screeching Weasel demo (1987)	1:20
30.	"I Hate Led Zeppelin" (Demo version)	Screeching Weasel / The Ozzfish Experience split EP (unreleased)	1:19
31.	"American Suicide" (Demo version)	Screeching Weasel / The Ozzfish Experience split EP (unreleased)	1:11
32.	"A Political Song for Screeching Weasel to Sing" (music by Jughead)	Screeching Weasel / The Ozzfish Experience split EP (unreleased)	2:08
33.	"Twinkie Warfare" (music by Jughead)	Screeching Weasel / The Ozzfish Experience split EP (unreleased)	2:10
34.	"Stoned and Stupid" (music by Bovine)	Previously unreleased	1:43
35.	"Life Sucks (And So Do You)"	Previously unreleased	1:33
36.	"I Wanna Be Naked" (Demo version)	Previously unreleased	1:50
37.	"My Right" (Demo version)	Previously unreleased	3:08
38.	"Hey Suburbia" (Demo version; music by Jughead and Weasel)	Previously unreleased	1:56
39.	"Ashtray" (Demo version)	Previously unreleased	2:18

== Personnel ==
- Ben Weasel – lead vocals, rhythm guitar on tracks 36 – 39
- Johnny Jughead – guitar, vocals on "Don't Touch My Car"
- Vinnie Bovine – bass
- Steve Cheese – drums, vocals on "O.M.W." and "K-Mart Blues"

Additional performers

- Warren Fish – bass on tracks 35 – 39

Production

- Phil Bonnet – producer, engineer
- Russ Forster; Screeching Weasel – mixers
- Mass Giorgini – remastering (reissue)

Artwork

- Paul Russel – cover art, additional artwork
- Ben Weasel; John Jughead – layout
- Billy Blastoff – design, layout (reissue)
