= Americruiser =

Studio album by Urge Overkill
- Released: 1990
- Genre: Indie rock
- Length: 26:53
- Label: Touch and Go
- Producer: Butch Vig

Urge Overkill chronology
Jesus Urge Superstar (1989)	Americruiser (1990)	The Supersonic Storybook (1991)

Professional ratings
Review scores
Source	Rating
AllMusic	3/5 stars
The Encyclopedia of Popular Music	2/5 stars
The New Rolling Stone Album Guide	2/5 stars
Spin Alternative Record Guide	5/10

Americruiser is the second album by American alternative rock group Urge Overkill, released in 1990.

== Critical reception ==
Trouser Press wrote: "Butch Vig's production of Americruiser ... cleans the sound up enough to reveal the thin strings, clunky tempos and weak hooks holding the songs together." Spin called the album "relentlessly hard and fast, but ... never murky." The Rough Guide to Rock wrote that "the songs had improved ... perhaps because they seemed less desperate to impress as comic narratives."

== Track listing ==
All songs written by Nash Kato and Eddie "King" Roeser.

1. "Ticket to L.A." – 2:16
2. "Blow Chopper" – 3:11
3. "76 Ball" – 2:59
4. "Empire Builder" – 4:11
5. "Faroutski" – 3:20
6. "Viceroyce" – 2:59
7. "Out on the Airstrip" – 4:08
8. "Smoke House" – 3:49

== Personnel ==
- Eddie "King" Roeser – lead vocals, bass guitar, guitars
- Nash Kato – guitars, vocals (lead: tracks 4 and 7)
- Jack "Jaguar" Watt – drums
