= Antischism =

American crust punk band

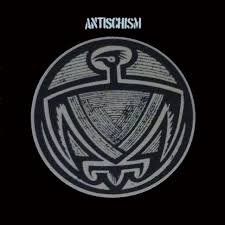
- The logo for the band Antischism, featuring a stylized bird.

Background information
- Also known as: Initial State (1993–1994)
- Origin: Columbia, South Carolina
- Genres: Crust punk; hardcore punk; powerviolence; anarcho-punk
- Years active: 1988–1991; 1993–1994
- Labels: Allied Recordings; Manifest Soundworks; Stereonucleosis Records; Selfless Records; Prank Records; Mind Control Records; Clearview Records
- Past members: Lyz Mueller; Kevin Byrd; Allan Mozingo; Scott Cooper; Brent; Matt

Antischism was an American crust punk band formed in 1988 in Columbia, South Carolina. Antischism broke up and then reformed in Austin, Texas, as Initial State. After Initial State's breakup in 1994, Byrd and Mueller went on to play in .Fuckingcom, with Byrd also starting Guyana Punch Line and eventually Thank God. Cooper moved to Savannah, Georgia, and played in Damad (now Kylesa), In/Humanity, Karst, and Chronicle A/D.

== Members ==
=== Final line-up ===
- Lyz Mueller - vocals (1988–1991; 1993–1994)
- Kevin Byrd - guitar (1988–1991; 1993–1994)
- Allan Mozingo - bass (1993–1994)
- Scott Cooper - drums, vocals (1988–1994)

=== Past members ===
- Brent - vocals (1991)
- Matt - bass (1988–1991)

== Discography ==
=== As Antischism ===
Albums

- Still Life, Allied Recordings (1991)

EPs

- All Their Money Stinks of Death", Manifest Soundworks (1988)
- End of Time, Stereonucleosis Records (1989)

Compilations

- Discography CD, Selfless Records (1995)
- Antischism (Discography) CD/2XLP, Prank Records (1998)

Live

- Live in the Studio, Selfless Records, Steronucleosis Records (1990)
- Thinning the Herd - Live split with Subvert, Mind Control Records (1990)

=== As Initial State ===
- Abort the Soul, Clearview Records (1994)
