= Stull (EP) =

- The EP's cover was taken in the Stull Cemetery. The Evangelical Emmanuel Church can be seen in the background. The foregrounded tombstone marks the grave of Isaac Stull, the father of the town's namesake.

EP by Urge Overkill
- Released: October 10, 1992
- Genre: Alternative rock
- Length: 18:51
- Label: Touch and Go
- Producer: Kramer

Urge Overkill chronology
The Supersonic Storybook (1991)	Stull (1992)	Saturation (1993)

Stull is the second extended play by the alternative rock band Urge Overkill. It was released in 1992 and would be the band's final major release on independent label Touch and Go Records. The EP's title and cover are direct references to Stull Cemetery, located just west of Lawrence, Kansas. Since the 1970s, urban legends have been spread that the cemetery is one of the seven portals to Hell. Stull also includes a cover of Neil Diamond's song "Girl, You'll Be a Woman Soon", which would later be re-released on the soundtrack to Quentin Tarantino's 1994 film Pulp Fiction. Upon re-issue, Urge Overkill's version of "Girl, You'll Be a Woman Soon" charted at number 59 on the Billboard Hot 100. The Stull EP received largely positive reviews from critics, with Stephen Thomas Erlewine of AllMusic and Johan Kugelberg of Spin both complimenting the record.

== Content ==
Stull contains two cover songs, the first of which is "Girl, You'll Be a Woman Soon", which was originally penned by Neil Diamond. According to the band's bassist and vocalist Eddie "King" Roeser, the group's decision to record the cover was "spur-of-the-moment" Two years after the song was issued on Stull, it was re-released on the soundtrack to Quentin Tarantino's 1994 film Pulp Fiction. In an interview with Billboard magazine, Roeser explained: "Apparently, Quentin [Tarantino] was familiar with us, and he picks all the songs for his movies. He discussed it with Uma Thurman, who dances to the song in the movie, and she's like, 'I love it.'" The song was a hit for the band, and charted at number 59 on the Billboard Hot 100. The EP's second cover song is "Stitches", which was originally written and recorded by the punk band the Alan Milman Sect in 1977.

The track "Stull (Part 1)" is a direct reference to Stull Cemetery, located a short ways to the west of Lawrence, Kansas. Since the 1970s, urban legends have been spread that the cemetery is one of the seven portals to Hell. In an interview with Spin, Eddie "King" Roeser noted that the cemetery is "a really frightening place. Supposedly it's some kind of cult location for satanists". According to the historian Sarah Smarsh, The song itself "describes a journey to the cemetery, the lyrics complete with three references to the number 'six' ('666' being the 'number of the beast' in the Bible) and a smattering of Charles Manson references for good measure."

== Reception ==
Professional ratings
Review scores
Source	Rating
AllMusic	4.5/5 stars
Spin	Positive

The EP received largely positive reviews from critics. Stephen Thomas Erlewine of AllMusic noted that while the EP was not as good as the band's album The Supersonic Storybook (1991), it was "almost as remarkable." Erlewine concludes that "as the richness of Stull proves, Urge's vision was too large for the independents, and it was time to move on." Johan Kugelberg of Spin praised the record, calling it "pretty close to flawless"; he specifically cited the band's cover of "Girl, You'll Be a Woman Soon" as a stand-out, describing it as "mind-boggling".

== Release ==
The Stull EP was released in 1992 on Touch and Go Records, in CD, 10" vinyl, and cassette tape format. Touch and Go would later re-release the EP on vinyl on October 30, 2015 .

== Track listing ==
All songs written by Nash Kato and Eddie "King" Roeser, except track one (which was written by Neil Diamond), and track three (which was written by Alan Milman).

1. "Girl, You'll Be a Woman Soon" – 3:11
2. "Stull (Part I)" – 5:25
3. "Stitches" – 2:09
4. "What's This Generation Coming To?" – 2:44
5. "(Now That's) The Barclords" – 3:34
6. "Goodbye to Guyville" – 4:48
