= Destination Universe =

Studio album by Material Issue
- Released: 1992
- Studio: Short Order
- Genre: Power pop
- Length: 42:55
- Label: Mercury
- Producers: Jeff Murphy, Material Issue

Material Issue chronology
International Pop Overthrow (1991)	Destination Universe (1992)	Freak City Soundtrack (1994)

Singles from Destination Universe
- 1. "What Girls Want" Released: 1992

Destination Universe is the second studio album by the American band Material Issue, released on Mercury Records in 1992. "What Girls Want" made the top ten on Billboard's Modern Rock Tracks chart. The band promoted the album with a "Pop Against Recession Tour".

== Production ==
Recorded at Short Order Recorder, in Zion, Illinois, the album was produced by Jeff Murphy and the band. Material Issue had more time and money to spend on the production. The album cover is a photo of a vintage Schwinn, purchased in Calumet City.

== Critical reception ==
Professional ratings
Review scores
Source	Rating
AllMusic	3/5 stars
Entertainment Weekly	A−
The Indianapolis Star	2.5/4 stars

Entertainment Weekly wrote: "Think of this music as a sort of landlocked ’90s Merseybeat, and trust in Ellison’s expertise in the mechanics that made that original Liverpool stuff so memorable: pocketsful of melodies, bursting guitars, and the unspoken belief that these are the things that make life worth living." Trouser Press concluded that the album "suffers from a serious lack of strong tunes."

Rolling Stone deemed it "not exactly a wildly original piece of work, but it's full of memorable pop-rock tracks." The Indianapolis Star determined that, "with rough Hollies vocals and keen grasp of styles that they heard as kids, Material Issue drives its own vehicle—but it's always cruising for girls."

== Track listing ==
All songs written by Jim Ellison

1. "What Girls Want" - 3:55
2. "When I Get This Way (Over You)" - 4:09
3. "Next Big Thing" - 3:12
4. "Who Needs Love" - 2:52
5. "Destination You" - 2:49
6. "Everything" - 3:48
7. "Ballad of a Lonely Man" - 3:27
8. "Girl from Out of This World" - 3:56
9. "So Easy to Love Somebody" - 2:49
10. "Don't You Think I Know" - 3:47
11. "The Loneliest Heart" - 2:38
12. "Whole Lotta You" - 2:52
13. "If Ever You Should Fall" - 2:41
