= Screeching Weasel / Born Against =

Screeching Weasel/Born Against split

EP by Screeching Weasel
- Released: 1993
- Recorded: May 1993 at the Flatiron Building, Chicago, Illinois (Screeching Weasel) Sonic Iguana Studios, Lafayette, Indiana (Born Against)
- Genre: Punk rock, Hardcore punk
- Label: Lookout! Records

Screeching Weasel/Born Against split is a split E.P. featuring Screeching Weasel and Born Against. It was released in 1993 on 7" vinyl and CD by Lookout! Records. "Janelle" prompted a response EP, The Real Janelle, by riot grrrl band Bratmobile, which drew attention to the divide between bratty pop punk and feminist riot grrrl punk.

== Vinyl Track listing ==
Side A (Screeching Weasel)
1. El Mozote
2. Fuck This

Side B (Born Against)
1. Janelle
2. Go Fuck Yourself

== CD Track listing ==
(Screeching Weasel)
1. El Mozote
2. Fuck This
3. Chicago
(Born Against)
4. Janelle
5. Go Fuck Yourself
6. Movin' On Up
