= International Pop Overthrow (album) =

Studio album by Material Issue
- Released: February 5, 1991
- Recorded: 1988–1991
- Studio: Short Order Recorder, Zion, Illinois
- Genre: Power pop
- Length: 44:56
- Label: Mercury
- Producer: Jeff Murphy

Material Issue chronology
International Pop Overthrow (1991)	Destination Universe (1992)

Singles from International Pop Overthrow
- 1. "Renee Remains the Same" Released: 1988; 2. "Valerie Loves Me" Released: 1991; 3. "Diane" Released: 1991

International Pop Overthrow is the debut studio album by Material Issue, released on Mercury Records on February 5, 1991. The album was recorded in multiple recording sessions between 1988 and 1991, with the total recording costs reaching only $5,000. Mercury Records only expected the record to sell about 70,000 copies. However, it initially sold about 180,000 copies, with final sales exceeding 300,000. It reached number 86 on the Billboard 200 album chart. The album was produced by Jeff Murphy, guitarist/vocalist for the band Shoes, at the Shoes' Short Order Recorder studio, in Zion, Illinois.

On April 5, 2011, the 20th anniversary edition was released, which included early singles and live tracks.

The International Pop Overthrow music festival was named in honor of this album.

== Reception ==
Professional ratings
Review scores
Source	Rating
AllMusic	4.5/5 stars
Pitchfork	7.9/10
Spin	7/10 stars

Mark Deming of AllMusic wrote, "Anyone who was looking for the future of power pop in 1991 might well have imagined these guys were it, and not without reason -- International Pop Overthrow is smart, hooky, and not afraid to sound edgy or let the amps go into the red." Michael Corcoran of the Chicago Sun-Times stated: "Though power pop (a.k.a. "the skinny-tie era") was the rage in New York and Los Angeles for only a brief time at the start of the '80s, that style of melodic rock has survived in the Midwest for two decades thanks to practitioners such as Cheap Trick, the Raspberries, Shoes and the Romantics. The band next poised to pop till they drop is Chicago's Material Issue, whose major-label debut has just been released by Mercury." Jae-Ha Kim, also of the Chicago Sun-Times, felt that the band's debut "paid delightful homage to girls, cars and power pop chords. At least seven of the cuts on the album were strong enough to be hit singles. Radio loved "Diane" and "Valerie Loves Me" the most."

Mark Deming of Rolling Stone called the album "smart, hooky, and not afraid to sound edgy or let the amps go into the red". Dale Anderson, writing for The Buffalo News, opined that "Material Issue could be the big college radio rave of the spring, thanks to the parade of perky tunes about girls they loved and lost on their new debut album, "International Pop Overthrow." Weaned on Cheap Trick, Shoes and other legends of Midwestern power pop in the late '70s, this Chicago trio lives, eats and breathes three-minute singles."

== Singles ==
Three songs from the album were released as singles: "Renee Remains the Same", "Valerie Loves Me" and "Diane".

== Track listing ==
All songs written by Jim Ellison.

1. "Valerie Loves Me" – 3:05
2. "Diane" – 2:55
3. "Renee Remains the Same" – 3:16
4. "This Letter" – 4:21
5. "Out Right Now" – 2:03
6. "Crazy" – 3:34
7. "Chance of a Lifetime" – 3:03
8. "International Pop Overthrow" – 2:29
9. "Very First Lie" – 3:30
10. "Trouble" – 3:18
11. "There Was a Few" – 3:23
12. "This Far Before" – 2:46
13. "A Very Good Idea" – 3:53
14. "Li'l Christine" – 3:21

== Personnel ==
- Jim Ellison – vocals, guitar
- Ted Ansani – bass, vocals
- Mike Zelenko – drums
