= Jesus Urge Superstar =

Studio album by Urge Overkill
- Released: March 22, 1989
- Genre: Alternative rock
- Length: 38:38
- Label: Touch and Go
- Producer: Steve Albini

Urge Overkill chronology
Jesus Urge Superstar (1989)	Americruiser (1990)

Jesus Urge Superstar is the debut studio album by the alternative rock band Urge Overkill. It was released in 1989. The album is noted for its ironic 1970s-worshipping aesthetic, which would become a staple of the band’s core identity.

"Very Sad Trousers" is about the band Royal Trux.

== Critical reception ==
Professional ratings
Review scores
Source	Rating
AllMusic	2/5 stars
The Encyclopedia of Popular Music	2/5 stars
The New Rolling Stone Album Guide	2/5 stars
Spin Alternative Record Guide	4/10

Trouser Press called the album "awful-sounding," writing that "the murk of thick mid-tempo guitar rock does nothing to prove the existence of songs, much less any audible trace of junk-culture devotion." The Spin Alternative Record Guide described it as "grinding guitars, distant, shouted vocals, and resolutely unfriendly subject matter." The Washington Post wrote that "Nate [sic] Kato's squalling high-end guitar has a certain delicacy to it and the trio's harmonies achieve a rough, yearning beauty."

== Track listing ==
All songs written by Nash Kato and Eddie "King" Roeser.

1. "God Flintstone"—5:08
2. "Very Sad Trousers"—3:29
3. "Your Friend Is Insane"—6:01
4. "Dump Dump Dump"—3:07
5. "Last Train to Heaven"—3:42
6. "The Polaroid Doll"—2:30
7. "Head On"—4:11
8. "Crown of Laffs"—3:54
9. "Dubbledead"—5:29
10. "Easter '88"—1:07
