= Sister Havana =

Single by Urge Overkill

from the album Saturation
- Released: 1993
- Genre: Alternative rock
- Length: 3:53
- Label: Geffen
- Producers: Butcher Bros.; Andy Kravitz

Urge Overkill singles chronology
"Now That's the Barclords" (1991)	"Sister Havana" (1993)	"Dropout" (1993)

Music video
- "Sister Havana" on YouTube

"Sister Havana" is an alternative rock song by Urge Overkill. It was released in 1993 as the lead single from their album, Saturation.

== Music video ==
The music video for "Sister Havana" was directed by Paul Andresen and George Dougherty. It has narrative scenes including a young woman interacting with the band and a man resembling Fidel Castro, along with the band performing.

== Personnel ==
- Nash Kato – lead vocals, guitar
- Eddie "King" Roeser – bass, guitar, vocals
- Blackie Onassis – drums

== Charts ==
Chart (1993)	Peak position
Australia (ARIA)	104
UK Singles (OCC)	67
US Mainstream Rock (Billboard)	10
US Modern Rock Tracks (Billboard)	6
