= Debutante (Nash Kato album) =

Studio album by Nash Kato
- Released: 2000
- Genre: Alternative rock
- Label: Will/Loosegroove Records
- Producer: Eric Rosse

Debutante is the solo debut album by the American musician Nash Kato, released in 2000. It was Kato's first musical release since Urge Overkill's Exit the Dragon; Kato had failed in his attempt to legally secure the UO name. The album's title was suggested by former Urge Overkill bandmate Blackie Onassis.

The album sold fewer than 5,000 copies. Kato promoted the album by opening for Cheap Trick on some North American tour dates.

== Production ==
The album was produced by Eric Rosse. Josh Freese played drums; Louise Post contributed backing vocals. "Dirty Work" is a cover of the Steely Dan song.

Kato cowrote some of the songs with Blackie Onassis. He spent two years working on them, and three months recording them, using a Santa Fe, New Mexico, portable studio.

== Critical reception ==
Professional ratings
Review scores
Source	Rating
AllMusic	3/5 stars
Entertainment Weekly	C+
Pitchfork	7.1/10

The Washington Post wrote that "like most rockers who take the solo route ... Kato only sometimes transcends his influences." Exclaim! called the album a "return to ornate suave pop." Pitchfork likened it to "a fuel-injected, rock-oriented Steely Dan."

The Chicago Reader deemed the album "a heaping dose of retro rock so dumb it makes Urge’s thin line between smug and sincere look like the Berlin Wall." SF Weekly concluded that "while some of the grooves and flourishes of Kato's backup band seem unconsciously cheesy, what they lack in taste is redeemed in skilled musicianship that lends more sophistication to Debutante than Urge Overkill was ever capable of providing." Entertainment Weekly determined that "the ironic trash-culture stance that seemed subversive during UO’s prime feels smug on Kato’s sleek new tunes."

AllMusic called the album "big, glossy hard rock, complete with a self-conscious sense of humor and an immersion in hipster pop culture."

== Track listing ==
No.	Title	Length
1.	"Zooey Suicide"
2.	"Queen of the Gangsters"
3.	"Octoroon"
4.	"Cradle Robbers"
5.	"Blow"
6.	"Debutante"
7.	"Dirty Work"
8.	"Rani (Don't Waste It)"
9.	"Los Angelena"
10.	"Black Satin Jacket"
11.	"Pillow Talk"
12.	"Born in the Eighties"
13.	"Blue Wallpaper"
