= Great Lakes Myth Society =

American Folk rock band

- Jamie (left) and Tim Monger play at the Halfass in East Quad at the University of Michigan

Background information
- Origin: Southeast Michigan, United States
- Genres: Indie rock, Indie Folk, Folk-Rock
- Years active: 1997-2003, 2004–Present
- Labels: Stop, Pop & Roll, Quack!Media
- Members: Timothy Monger; Jamies "Jamie" Christopher Monger; Fido Kennington; Greg McIntosh; Scott McClintock
- Past members: Liz Auchinvole; Martin Juarez
- Website: greatlakesmythsociety.com

Great Lakes Myth Society (GLMS) is an American musical group from southeast Michigan, formed in 2004. Originally called "The Original Brothers and Sisters of Love", they write and perform songs about the state, such as myths or stories from around the area, as well as more contemporary, non-regional work.

== History ==
=== Early years ===
The Original Brothers and Sisters of Love (originally titled The Original Brothers of Love) was formed in Brighton, Michigan, in the mid 1990's as a duo of brothers Jamie and Timothy Monger. The brothers had played and led in many local bands before forming the band. After releasing two cassettes, they began playing shows in nearby Ann Arbor and started recording what would be their first album The Legende of Jeb Minor in 1996.

In 1998, the band had fully moved to Ann Arbor.

A year later, they finally released their first album on the label Planet Ant, which was later reissued nationally on a new label, The Telegraph Company.

In 2001 they released their second album H.O.M.E.S Vol. One.

Soon after, they finished what would be their third album, although in 2003, their label had gone bankrupt.

=== Great Lakes Myth Society ===
After the bankruptcy of their label, and with the departure of violinist Liz Auchinvole, the band split up, though quickly reformed a year later as the Great Lakes Myth Society.

Their first record was released by Stop, Pop, and Roll in April 2005, originally titled H.O.M.E.S Vol. two, but due to the name change, was now self-titled.

They signed to Ann Arbor-based Quack!Media in 2007 and began recording their second record, Compass Rose Bouquet (2007), which was released soon after.

In 2008 the band released She's Come Home to Steal Her Rainbows / Brablec Farms, which is a rerecording of an Original Brothers and Sisters of Love song.

=== Later years and recent history ===
After the release of Compass Rose Bouquet, the band soon started recording their third album, but had to postpone the process indefinitely as one of their original members moved out of state, and eventually recording ceased.

In early 2011, Chevrolet used excerpts from their songs "Midwest Main Street" and "Debutante" on its Detroit metropolitan area commercials.

== Discography ==
(as The Original Brothers and Sisters of Love)

- The Legende of Jeb Minor (1999)
- H.O.M.E.S. Vol. One (2001)

(As Great Lakes Myth Society)

- Great Lakes Myth Society (2005)
- Compass Rose Bouquet (2007)
- She's Come Home to Steal Her Rainbows / Brablec Farms (2008)
