= Carnival of Schadenfreude =

EP by Screeching Weasel
- Released: October 29, 2011
- Recorded: July 2011 at the Kennerty Household
- Genre: Punk rock, pop punk
- Label: Recess Records
- Producer: Mike Kennerty

Screeching Weasel chronology
Jesus Hates You (1999)	Carnival of Schadenfreude (2011)

Carnival of Schadenfreude is the twelfth E.P. by Chicago punk rock band Screeching Weasel.

== Track listing ==
All tracks are written by Ben Weasel.

No.	Title	Length
1.	"Carnival of Schadenfreude"	1:35
2.	"Fox News"	1:07
3.	"Queen Kong"	1:19
4.	"Muscle Mary"	2:06
5.	"The Parasite Murders"	1:21
6.	"No Reason to Lie"	1:54
7.	"Under the Bus"	2:15

== Lineup ==
- Ben Weasel - vocals
- Zac Damon - guitar
- Dave Klein - bass
- Pierre Marche - drums
