= Dave Klein (punk musician) =

American bass guitarist

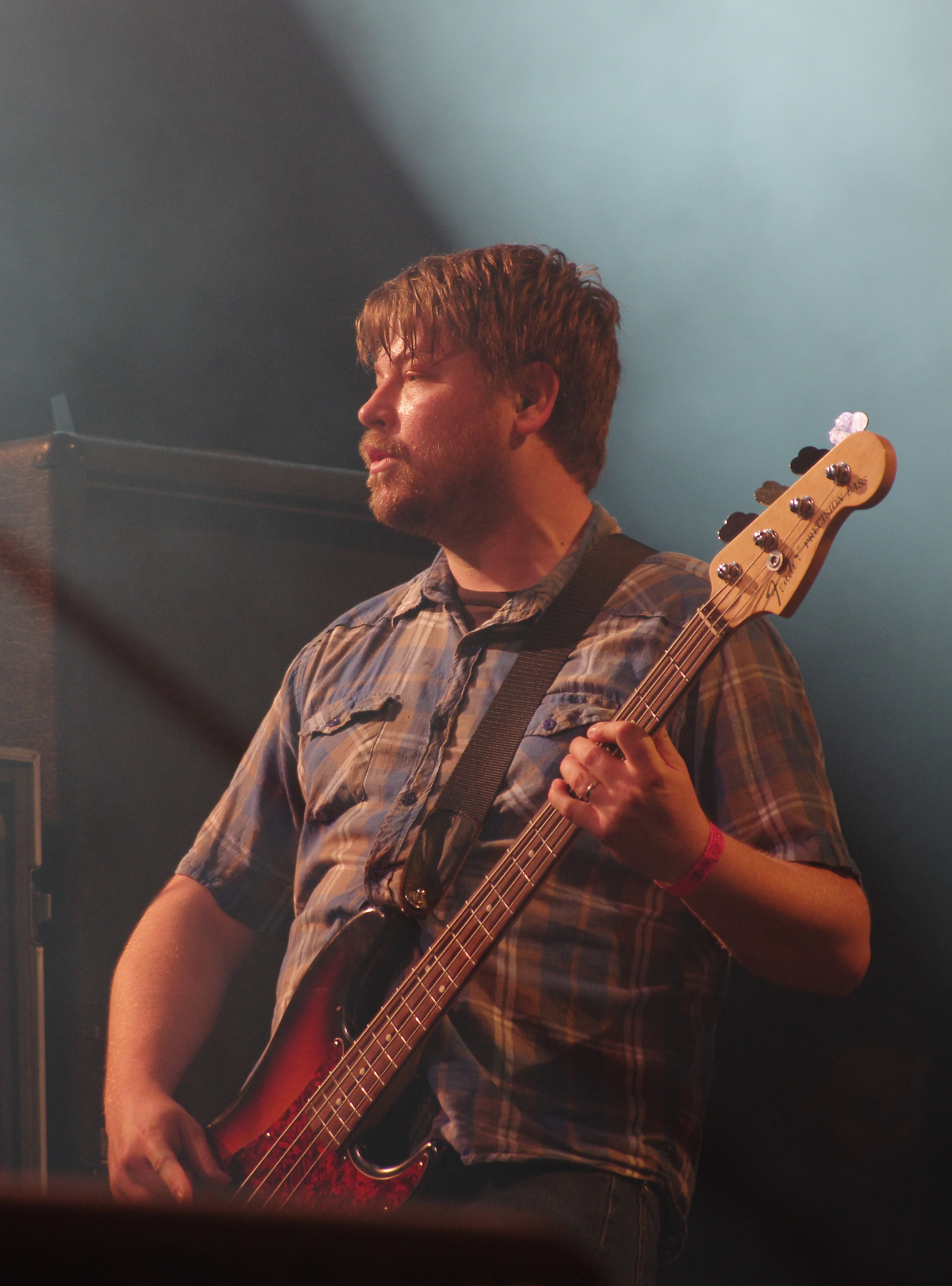
- Klein performing with Black Flag in 2013

Background information
- Born: May 31, 1979 (age 46)
- Origin: Edmond, Oklahoma, U.S.
- Genres: Rock, punk rock
- Occupation: Bassist
- Years active: 1993–present
- Spouse: Kelli Klein (m. 2001)

Dave Klein (born May 31, 1979) is an American bass guitarist. He currently plays bass for punk and rock bands: A Vulture Wake, Aggravated Nuisance, and They Stay Dead. Former bands include: Screeching Weasel, Black Flag, Wretch Like Me, Good For You, Bi-Products, Jettison, Euclid Crash, American Ruse, et al. He has also worked as a studio musician, founded and developed numerous bands, and performed hundreds of concerts internationally since 1993.

== Career ==
=== Early career ===
Klein is earliest credited in 1997 as the bassist for the Oklahoma punk band, Bi-Products, self-released debut split 7" vinyl. This album also featured drummer Chris Gaylor, best known for his work with The All-American Rejects. Klein later moved north to Kansas City, Missouri – joining Jettison for live shows. The 1998 recording of the band's demo was subsequently released as "The Original Jettison Tapes" in 2016 as a benefit for ailing founder and songwriter John Fackler.

In 2000, Klein joined Colorado-based 'Wretch Like Me', replacing Jeff Matz upon his departure to join the Seattle, Washington-based psych rock band Zeke. Klein Toured with the band until 2002 upon the release of their final album "I Am Become Death."

Klein went on to become a founding member of Oklahoma City based band "They Stay Dead'. Between 2011–2019, the band released three E.P.s and one single.

=== Screeching Weasel ===
Klein was announced as Screeching Weasel's new bass player at the October 29, 2011 "Carnival of Schadenfreude" record release concert at Reggie's in Chicago, IL. He continued to play live shows with the band until March 27, 2013, when Ben Weasel announced on social media the bassist was leaving Screeching Weasel to Join Black Flag as touring bassist. In the post, Ben stated, "It's my sad duty to report that Dave Klein has left the Screeching Weasel fold. Black Flag came calling, and he answered the bell. And who can blame him? When Black Flag says they want to hire you, you suit up, give notice to the circus, and report for duty". But Klein didn't stray far from the camp as he played on much of Screeching Weasel's 2015 rock opera "Baby Fat: Act 1" and is also credited with vocals on the album.

=== Black Flag ===
Klein earned the title of touring bassist for American Punk-Rock Band Black Flag during their 2013 reunion tour. At this time he also joined Black Flag guitarist, singer, and bassist Greg Ginn's band, Good For You, alongside action-sports legend Mike Vallely. Reportedly, it was a tumultuous year of touring that ended in Perth, Australia when Vallely told Black Flag's vocalist, Ron Reyes that the "party" was "over" and took the microphone to finish the band's set. Weeks later, Klein announced his departure from the SST ventures to rejoin 'They Stay Dead' and release the band's "Bruise Banner" single in December 2013. Klein mentioned the departure on social media, posting, "I guess I should OFFICIALLY (puns!) say that I'm no longer playing with BF."

=== A Vulture Wake ===
Klein replaced Joe Raposo in A Vulture Wake as touring bassist in the summer of 2019. He played bass on the band's sophomore album One.Kingdom.Animal, released November 11, 2022 on Thousand Islands Records. He continues to tour with the band alongside founding member and main songwriter Chad Price.

== Discography ==
Year	Artist	Release	Label	Format
1997	The Bi-Products	The Bi-Products / Aspects Split 7"	n/a	EP/Vinyl
2002	Wretch Like Me	I Am Become Death	Owned and Operated Recordings	LP
2003	Zildo	s/t	n/a	Single
2007	American Ruse	Do The Pop	Fandango Records	Single
2010	Euclid Crash	Girl Talk	n/a	EP
2011	They Stay Dead	s/t	Death to False Hope Records	EP
2011	They Stay Dead	Betray	Death to False Hope Records	EP
2012	Screeching Weasel	Carnival of Schadenfreude	Recess Records	EP/Vinyl
2013	They Stay Dead	Bruise Banner	Jailhouse Records	Single
2015	Screeching Weasel	Baby Fat, Act 1	Recess Records	LP
2016	Jettison	The Original Jettison Tapes	n/a	
2019	Aggravated Nuisance	Deadly Forces	n/a	EP
2020	They Stay Dead	Regression	n/a	EP
2022	A Vulture Wake	Kingdom	Thousand Islands Records	EP
2022	A Vulture Wake	Animal	Thousand Islands Records	EP
2022	A Vulture Wake	One.Kingdom.Animal	Thousand Islands Records	LP
