= Pervo Devo =

Pervo-Devo

EP by Screeching Weasel
- Released: 1991
- Recorded: July 3 and 9, 1991 at Art of Ears, San Francisco
- Genre: Punk rock, pop punk
- Label: Shred of Dignity, Outpunk
- Producer: Andy Ernst and Larry Livermore

Pervo-Devo is the second E.P. by punk rock band Screeching Weasel. It consists of songs that were recorded for My Brain Hurts but were left off the album. The E.P. was originally included with the final issue of "Teen Punks in Heat", a sex-themed 'zine penned by Ben Weasel. There were two pressing of the record. Between the two pressings, the record label changed its name from "Shred of Dignity" to "Outpunk". All of the songs resurfaced on the band's B-sides album Kill the Musicians, though the spoken intro to "I Wanna Be A Homosexual" by Bruce LaBruce appears only on this 7".

== Track listing ==
1. "I Wanna Be a Homosexual" (Weasel/Jughead/Vapid) – 3:04
2. "She's Giving Me the Creeps" (Weasel/Vapid) – 2:23
3. "I Fall to Pieces" (H.Cochran/H. Howard) – 2:11

== Personnel ==
- Ben Weasel - lead vocals
- Jughead - guitar
- Danny Vapid - guitar, backing vocals
- Dave Naked - bass
- Danny Panic - drums
