= Selfless Records =

Punk rock music label

Selfless Records is a record label that releases punk rock music. The label was notable for putting out a number of albums that were covers of entire Ramones albums, including Leave Home, Ramones and Rocket to Russia.

== Artists ==
- Antischism
- Big Boys
- Dag Nasty
- The Dicks
- Dropdead
- The Queers
- Screeching Weasel
- The Vindictives
- The Mr. T Experience
