= Ted Ansani =

American musician

Ted Ansani is an American musician who is most known as the bassist/vocalist of 1990s power pop group Material Issue.

== Career ==
The Chicago-based band Material Issue released four studio albums, but ceased working shortly after frontman Jim Ellison's suicide.

Following Ellison's suicide and the subsequent release of Material Issue's final album, Telecommando Americano, Ansani toured for a year with Chicago band Teenage Frames from 1997 to 1998. During that time, he also worked with Material Issue drummer Mike Zelenko playing with the bands Slink Moss and Hummer. In 2000, Ansani returned to record on Teenage Frames' 5 song EP, Kingsize Sessions.

In 2000, Ansani released his own solo EP called Throttle and Pistons - The Ted Ansani Project.

Ted Ansani continues to work in the music business in Chicago; he has made several live appearances in the last few years in and around Chicago and has also played the IPO festival when it has come to Chicago.

Ansani currently performs in the Chicago area with bands Diving for Dynamite, Legendary Rockstars, and the "Ted Ansani Project".

== Personal life ==
Ansani is married with three children and resides in Park Ridge, Illinois.
