= Rock & Roll Submarine =

Studio album by Urge Overkill
- Released: May 10, 2011
- Genre: Alternative rock
- Length: 39:17
- Label: UO Records
- Producer: Urge Overkill

Urge Overkill chronology
Exit the Dragon (1995)	Rock & Roll Submarine (2011)	Oui (2022)

Professional ratings
Review scores
Source	Rating
AllMusic	4/5 stars
The New Zealand Herald	4/5 stars
Pitchfork	5.8/10

Rock & Roll Submarine is an album by alternative rock band Urge Overkill, released in 2011. It was their first album in sixteen years.

== Critical reception ==
Spin wrote: "Calcifying their trademark lounge leer into a dead-eyed glare, singer-guitarists Nash Kato and Ed 'King' Roeser ply curdled Bad Company riffs and a seedy, confessional air, serving up shit cocktails to anyone foolish enough to swallow ’90s nostalgia." The A.V. Club wrote that the band "keeps the Nuge-style riffage on Rock & Roll Submarine rooted in the realities of basement-show grime, tamping down the old stadium-ruling ambitions with wanton sloppiness and purposefully duller hooks." The Washington Post wrote that if the album "displays less attitude than Urge’s ’90s work, that’s probably because [Eddie] Roeser has gradually supplanted the flashier [Nash] Kato as the principal songwriter." The New Yorker thought that the Urge Overkill of Rock & Roll Submarine "offers a more raw sound, but with tightly arranged and raspingly sung anthems."

== Track listing ==
1. "Mason/Dixon"—2:58
2. "Rock & Roll Submarine"—4:01
3. "Effigy"—3:44
4. "Poison Flower"—2:32
5. "Little Vice"—3:14
6. "Thought Balloon"—4:13
7. "Quiet Person"—3:23
8. "She's My Ride"—3:33
9. "End of Story"—3:24
10. "The Valiant"—3:45
11. "Niteliner"—2:21
12. "Touched to a Cut"—2:09
