= Phase Three (album) =

Phase 3
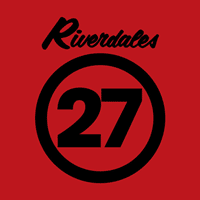

Studio album by The Riverdales
- Released: July 22, 2003; October 7, 2008
- Recorded: 2003
- Genre: Punk rock, pop punk
- Length: 23:17; 33:41 (Re-issue)
- Label: 1-4-5 Records, Asian Man
- Producer: Mass Giorgini, Ben Foster

The Riverdales chronology
Storm the Streets (1997)	Phase 3 (2003)	Invasion U.S.A. (2009)

Professional ratings
Review scores
Source	Rating
Stylus	B+

Phase 3 is the third studio album by the American punk rock band The Riverdales. It was released in 2003 through 1-4-5 Records. It was the first new Riverdales album in six years, and the first Riverdales album to feature drummer Dan Lumley. It was re-released on October 7, 2008, by Asian Man Records, who had also reissued the band's first album Riverdales in 2006. The album was completely re-mixed and re-mastered, including five previously unreleased songs and new artwork. Four of the bonus tracks were totally new and one was a new arrangement and recording of "Mental Retard" (from the Storm the Streets album). Although the reissue was advertised as having re-recorded vocals, Ben Weasel has stated that this is not correct. The lyrics to the song "Last Stop Tokyo" are printed on the back of the CD insert and was the first time that the Riverdales released any lyrics to the public. Although written by Ben Foster, the song "Wait It Out" was first recorded by The Lillingtons on their 2001 album The Backchannel Broadcast. Since the relationship between Asian Man and all Ben Weasel related music is now severed, the album may be re-issued yet again sometime in the future.

== Original 2003 Track listing ==
- All songs written by Ben Foster and Dan Schafer
1. "Homesick" - 1:54
2. "A.W.O.M." - 1:49
3. "Sniper" - 1:14
4. "Lead The Way" - 1:24
5. "Out Of My Heart" - 2:53
6. "Look Me Up" - 2:33
7. "Wait It Out" - 1:45
8. "Getaway" - 2:05
9. "Tick Tick Tick" - 1:28
10. "I Believe In You And Me" - 2:01
11. "Party At The Beach" - 1:43
12. "Last Stop Tokyo" - 2:28

== 2008 Reissue Track listing ==
1. "Countdown" - 1:45
2. "Party At The Beach" - 1:43
3. "A.W.O.M." - 1:49
4. "Sniper" - 1:14
5. "Lead The Way" - 1:24
6. "Getaway" - 2:05
7. "Total Blockhead" - 1:43
8. "I Believe In You And Me" - 2:01
9. "Out Of My Heart" - 2:53
10. "Homesick" - 1:54
11. "Mental Retard" - 2:00
12. "Out For Myself" - 3:22
13. "Wait It Out" - 1:45
14. "Look Me Up" - 2:33
15. "Tick Tick Tick" - 1:28
16. "You Know You Do" - 1:34
17. "Last Stop Tokyo" - 2:28

== Personnel ==
- Ben Foster - guitar, lead vocals
- Dan Schafer - bass, lead vocals
- Dan Lumley - drums, backing vocals
