= Freak City Soundtrack =

Studio album by Material Issue
- Released: 1994
- Genre: Power pop
- Length: 35:16
- Label: Mercury
- Producer: Mike Chapman

Material Issue chronology
Destination Universe (1992)	Freak City Soundtrack (1994)	Goin' Through Your Purse (1994)

Singles from Freak City Soundtrack
- 1. "Kim the Waitress" Released: 1994

Freak City Soundtrack is the third studio album by Material Issue, released on Mercury Records in 1994. It was the last studio album the band would record before frontman Jim Ellison died by suicide in 1996.

== Production ==
The album was produced by Mike Chapman, who also produced breakthrough albums for Blondie and the Knack. Rick Nielsen appears on the album.

== Critical reception ==
Professional ratings
Review scores
Source	Rating
AllMusic	3/5 stars
The Encyclopedia of Popular Music	3/5 stars
MusicHound Rock: The Essential Album Guide	2.5/5 stars

Trouser Press called the album "an unqualified triumph," and praised "Help Me Land" as "two minutes of slashing power chords, a frenzied vocal and Zelenko’s totally out-of-control drumming." The Hartford Courant called it "40 minutes of high-energy, minimal-angst-factor fun." The Chicago Tribune called Freak City Soundtrack "a return to form ... It comes as close as any disc to capturing the band's live energy."

== Track listing ==
All songs written by Jim Ellison except when noted.

1. "Goin' Through Your Purse" - 3:23
2. "Kim the Waitress" (Jeff Kelly, Jim Kelly) - 4:57
3. "Funny Feeling" - 3:25
4. "The Fan" - 3:05
5. "One Simple Word" - 2:44
6. "A Very Good Thing" - 2:42
7. "I Could Use You" - 4:10
8. "Ordinary Girl" - 3:11
9. "Eko Beach" - 2:35
10. "She's Going Through My Head" - 3:11
11. "Help Me Land" - 1:53
