= Debutante Stakes =

The Debutante Stakes is the name of a Thoroughbred horse race in various countries:

- Debutante Stakes (Ireland)
- Churchill Downs Debutante Stakes
- Del Mar Debutante Stakes
