= Compass Rose Bouquet =

Studio album by Great Lakes Myth Society
- Released: July 10, 2007
- Recorded: 2006–2007
- Genre: Sunshine pop
- Length: –
- Label: Quack!Media
- Producer: Great Lakes Myth Society

Great Lakes Myth Society chronology
Great Lakes Myth Society (2005)	Compass Rose Bouquet (2007)

Professional ratings
Review scores
Source	Rating
Allmusic	link

Compass Rose Bouquet is the second album by the American rock band, Great Lakes Myth Society. It was released on June 10, 2007.

== Track listing ==
1. "Heydays"
2. "Summer Bonfire"
3. "Nightfall at Electric Park"
4. "Queen of the Barley Fool"
5. "March"
6. "Eastern Birds"
7. "Stump Speech"
8. "Midwest Main Street"
9. "Days of Apple Pie"
10. "Raindrops & Roses"
11. "Debutante"
12. "The Gales of 1838"

== Personnel ==
- Timothy Monger
- Jamie Monger
- Gregory McIntosh
- Scott McClintock
- Fido Kennington
