= Boogadaboogadaboogada! =

- Original Roadkill cover

Studio album by Screeching Weasel
- Released: December 1988
- Recorded: October 8–16, 1988
- Studios: Solid Sound, Hoffman Estates, Illinois
- Genres: Punk rock; hardcore punk; skate punk; pop-punk
- Length: 40:46
- Labels: Roadkill; Lookout! (LK 62); Asian Man; Recess
- Producers: Ben Weasel and Jughead

Screeching Weasel chronology
Screeching Weasel (1987)	Boogadaboogadaboogada! (1988)	My Brain Hurts (1991)

Boogadaboogadaboogada! is the second studio album by the Chicago-based punk rock band Screeching Weasel. The album was originally released on vinyl in December 1988 through Roadkill Records. It was the group's only album to feature Fish on bass and the last with Steve Cheese on drums, both leaving the band shortly after the album's release. Although still influenced by hardcore punk, the album also shows hints of the band's later Ramones-inspired sound.

The initial pressing consisted of 2,000 copies, with an additional 176 being pressed by Roadkill co-owner Dave Best to fill up extra jackets he had. It was remixed for release in the UK in early 1989 and the remixed version is found on every subsequent release of the album. It was re-released on CD, vinyl, and cassette by Lookout! Records (LK 62) on September 25, 1992, was later remastered and reissued on CD by Asian Man Records in 2005. Recess Records reissued a vinyl version in 2008 and then on CD in 2010. It is the best-selling album of the band's discography. The record also became the blueprint for the nascent pop punk genre, with a legion of bands and fans alike citing it as influential.

== Background and recording ==
After the pressing plant they got to press their split EP with local band The Ozzfish Experience filed for bankruptcy and kept the master tapes, the group scrapped the EP and tensions grew between bassist Vinnie Bovine and the other members. Vocalist Ben Weasel later said that Bovine and his personal problems "made the band a living hell" and the other members fired him in early 1988. The Ozzfish Experience broke up around the same time, so Bovine was replaced by their guitarist/vocalist Warren Fischer (renamed simply "Fish"). Although not recorded yet, the band began looking for a label to release their second album. After not finding anyone again, the group opted to release it themselves. However, they then met Dave Best, a man who was starting his own record label and wanted Weasel and guitarist Jughead to help him run it. The two agreed and started Roadkill Records and made a deal to record the album in October. In summer 1988, the band traveled to Berkeley, California to play at the 924 Gilman Street club opening for ska punk band Operation Ivy. While in Berkeley, the band made friends with many of the people from the Gilman Street Project, including the members of Operation Ivy, Crimpshrine and Lookout Records owner Larry Livermore. Livermore offered to release Screeching Weasel's second album, but Weasel told him it was already planned for release on Roadkill.

The group began recording Boogadaboogadaboogada! at Solid Sound Studio in October with Weasel and Jughead handling production duties. Phil Bonnet, who produced the band's debut album, served as engineer and mixer. The album was recorded in four days on October 8, 9, 15 and 16, 1988. Although Weasel is credited for playing guitar in the album's liner notes, he later admitted to only playing on about a quarter of the tracks. The band chose the title Boogadaboogadaboogada! as a reference to the friend who came up with the band's name, Matt Carlson. Carlson reportedly used the phrase "Boogadaboogadaboogada!" when he "felt like vocally appreciating good-looking girls whilst passing by them in his car."

== Release and reception ==
Professional ratings
Review scores
Source	Rating
AllMusic	3/5 stars

Mike DaRonco of AllMusic gave the album 3 out of 5 stars and called the album "quite an improvement from their first album", stating "instead of the 'let's play as fast as we can without any regard to the quality of our songs' mentality, there's a lot more personality and playfulness to go along with their raging adolescence." DaRonco called the album "skate punk with a brain and sense of humor" and said it has "the ultimate party feel, perfect for any circle pit or Thrasher skate video." The album was also included at number 45 on Rock Sound's "The 51 Most Essential Pop Punk Albums of All Time" list.

== Track listing ==
All tracks are written by Ben Weasel, except where noted.

Sideshow
No.	Title	Length
1.	"Dingbat" (Includes an excerpt from All in the Family on original Roadkill version)	1:58
2.	"Love"	1:49
3.	"Zombie" (music by Jughead)	1:36
4.	"This Ain't Hawaii"	1:52
5.	"We Skate" (music by Jughead)	0:12
6.	"Police Insanity" (music by Fish)	1:16
7.	"Stupid Over You"	2:08
8.	"Runaway" (written by Del Shannon and Max Crook)	0:33
9.	"I Hate Led Zeppelin"	1:06
10.	"My Right"	2:56
11.	"Nicarauga"	0:57
12.	"Sunshine" (Includes part of "Open Up Your Heart (And Let the Sunshine In)" in the chorus)	2:43
13.	"I Wanna Be Naked" (Includes an interpretation of "I Wanna Be Sedated" by the Ramones in the bridge)	1:43
14.	"Boogada" (Collage of stage banter; only on the Roadkill pressing)	0:54

Sidewalk
No.	Title	Length
15.	"Ashtray"	2:00
16.	"American Suicide"	1:13
17.	"Psychiatrist"	2:34
18.	"Mad at the Paper Boy"	0:47
19.	"I Love to Hate"	1:03
20.	"More Problems" (written by Fish)	1:18
21.	"Supermarket Fantasy"	1:30
22.	"Holy Hardcore" (music by Jughead)	1:25
23.	"Professional Distribution" (music by Jughead)	1:46
24.	"Used Cars"	0:46
25.	"Hunter" (written by Fish)	0:22
26.	"I Believe in UFO's"	3:16
27.	"Hey Suburbia" (music by Jughead and Weasel)	1:57

== Personnel ==
- Ben Weasel – lead vocals, guitar
- Jughead – guitar, backing vocals
- Fish – bass, lead vocals on "More Problems"
- Steve Cheese – drums

Production

- Ben Weasel; Jughead – producers
- Phil Bonnet – engineer, mixing
- Paul Russel – cover art, artwork
- Martin Sorrondeguy; Tim Carlson – photography
- Mass Giorgini – remastering
