= Exit the Dragon =

Studio album by Urge Overkill
- Released: September 26, 1995
- Genre: Alternative rock
- Length: 59:41
- Label: Geffen
- Producer: Butcher Bros.

Urge Overkill chronology
Saturation (1993)	Exit the Dragon (1995)	Rock & Roll Submarine (2011)

Singles from Exit the Dragon
- 1. "The Break" Released: 1995; 2. "View of the Rain" Released: 1995; 3. "Somebody Else's Body" Released: 1995

Professional ratings
Review scores
Source	Rating
AllMusic	4.5/5 stars
The Encyclopedia of Popular Music	4/5 stars
Entertainment Weekly	B+
MusicHound Rock: The Essential Album Guide	3.5/5 stars
NME	9/10
Q	4/5 stars
Rolling Stone	3/5 stars
Spin	7/10

Exit the Dragon is the fifth album by American alternative rock group Urge Overkill, released in 1995. Exit the Dragon is characterized as being a darker album than their previous album, Saturation. It was their final album until the release of Rock & Roll Submarine in 2011. Exit the Dragon peaked at number 129 on the Billboard 200, making it their highest charting album in the United States.

== Production ==
The album was produced by the Butcher Bros.

== Critical reception ==
The album received positive reviews from critics. The Los Angeles Times wrote that the album's "fab pop tunes are as cheesily amusing as a dubbed karate movie. But when the kitsch clears, you have to wonder whether the band ... has anything of its own to offer." The Chicago Tribune praised "the kind of understated, seemingly casual performances that bespeak a band less interested in dazzle than emotional immediacy, with sturdy melodies, raggedly poignant vocals and brooding lyrics."

== Track listing ==
No.	Title	Lead vocals	Length
1.	"Jaywalkin'"	Eddie "King" Roeser	3:31
2.	"The Break"	Roeser	3:44
3.	"Need Some Air"	Nash Kato	3:07
4.	"Somebody Else's Body"	Kato	3:48
5.	"Honesty Files"	Roeser	3:55
6.	"This Is No Place"	Roeser	4:20
7.	"The Mistake"	Blackie Onassis	4:30
8.	"Take Me"	Roeser with Kato	2:58
9.	"View of the Rain"	Kato	4:46
10.	"Last Night / Tomorrow"	Roeser / Kato	5:21
11.	"Tin Foil"	Roeser	4:28
12.	"Monopoly"	Kato	3:29
13.	"And You'll Say"	Roeser	3:39
14.	"Digital Black Epilogue"	Kato	9:27

== Personnel ==
- Eddie "King" Roeser – vocals, bass guitar, guitars
- Nash Kato – vocals, guitars, keyboards
- Blackie Onassis – drums, vocals

== Charts ==
Chart (1995)	Peak position
Australian Albums (ARIA)	6
Austrian Albums (Ö3 Austria)	37
Canada Top Albums/CDs (RPM)	46
German Albums (Offizielle Top 100)	48
New Zealand Albums (RMNZ)	50
Norwegian Albums (VG-lista)	24
UK Albums (Official Charts)	88
US Billboard 200	129
