= Screeching Weasel =

American punk rock band

- Origin: Prospect Heights, Illinois, U.S.
- Genres: Punk rock, pop punk, skate punk, hardcore punk (early)
- Years active: 1986–1989; 1991–1994; 1996–2001; 2004; 2009–present
- Labels: Monona, Underdog, Roadkill, Lookout!, Selfless, Fat Wreck Chords, Panic Button, Asian Man, Recess
- Members: Ben Weasel; Gianluca "Ginger" Panero; Mike Hunchback; Pierre Marche; Zach "Poutine" Brandner
- Past members: John Jughead; Vinnie Bovine; Steve Cheese; Warren Fish; Aaron Cometbus; Brian Vermin; Douglas Ward; Dave Naked; Scott "Gub" Conway; Dan Panic; Johhny Personality; Mike Dirnt; Mass Giorgini; Dan Lumley; Phillip Hill; Simon Lamb; Dan Vapid; Drew Fredrichsen; Justin Perkins; Adam Cargin; Dave Klein; Zac Damon; Trevor Jackson; Mike Kennerty
- Website: screechingweasel.com

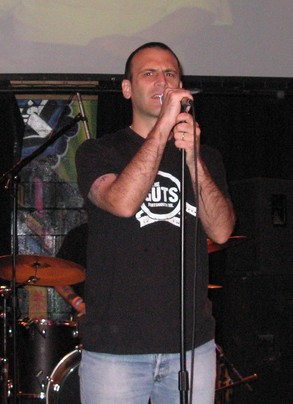
Ben Weasel

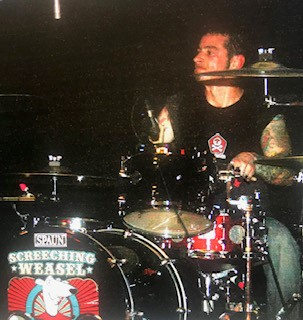
Pierre Marche 2011

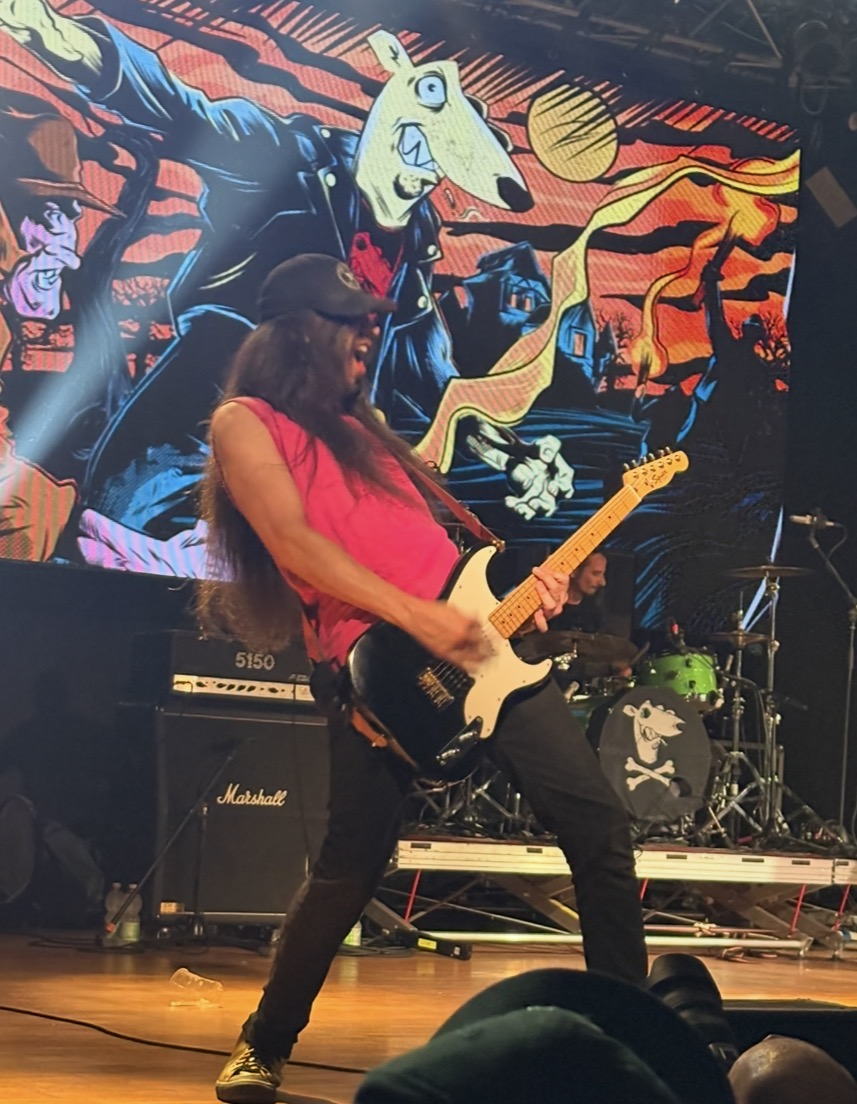
Gianluca "Ginger" Panero 2026

Screeching Weasel is an American punk rock band consisting of Ben Weasel (vocals), Gianluca "Ginger" Panero (guitar), Mike Hunchback (guitar), Zach "Poutine" Brandner (bass) and Pierre Marche (drums) founded in 1986 by Ben Weasel and John Jughead. Screeching Weasel is originally from the Chicago suburb of Prospect Heights, Illinois. Since their formation, Screeching Weasel has reformed several times with lineup changes. Ben Weasel has been the only constant member, though Jughead was present in every incarnation of the band until 2009. Other prominent members include guitarist/bassist Dan Vapid and drummer Dan Panic, who have each appeared on six of the band's studio albums, and Green Day bassist Mike Dirnt who appeared on one.

Screeching Weasel has recorded 14 studio albums so far, splitting time between a number of famous independent record labels such as Lookout! Records and Fat Wreck Chords. Despite never achieving mainstream success, they maintain a small devoted fanbase and a number of popular acts cite them as influential.

== History ==
=== Early years (1986–1989) ===
The band originally called themselves All Night Garage Sale but changed their name to Screeching Weasel, a variation of a name a friend had suggested, Screaming Otter, which was a reference to a T-shirt that read, "I've got a screaming otter in my pants!". Shortly after their formation, Weasel decided that it was too difficult to play bass and sing at the same time, so Vince Vogel, who took the stage name "Vinnie Bovine" joined as the band's bassist. The band recorded their debut album, Screeching Weasel, in one night for $200 and released it on Chicago label Underdog Records in 1987.

In 1988, Bovine was fired from the band and was replaced with Warren Fischer, better known as Fish, and former member of the band Ozzfish. The band recorded their second studio album, Boogadaboogadaboogada!, which featured Weasel playing second guitar (he would later state that he only played on about a quarter of the songs) and made a name for themselves by opening a show for Operation Ivy at 924 Gilman Street. Steve Cheese was fired from the band shortly after the recording due to his unwillingness to tour outside of Chicago. He was replaced by Aaron Cometbus for two shows who then was replaced by Brian Vermin. Boogadaboogadaboogada! was released in late 1988 on Roadkill Records, a label formed by David Best.

After what Weasel described as a "disastrous" tour, Fish left the group and was replaced by Dan Schafer, originally nicknamed "Sewercap" and later renamed Danny Vapid. The new band members recorded an extended play entitled Punkhouse for Limited Potential Records soon after that. The band ended up recording four more songs in 1989 that were featured on compilations, featuring a second guitarist Doug Ward, who also joined the band for several live performances. Screeching Weasel disbanded when Vermin and Vapid stated that they wanted to leave the band to concentrate on their side project, Sludgeworth.

=== First reformation (1991–1994) ===
After the break-up, Weasel and Jughead formed a new band called The Gore Gore Girls, and Ben briefly performed in the original incarnation of The Vindictives. On December 29, 1990, the members of Screeching Weasel reunited for what was intended as a one-off gig to pay off debts the band incurred from the recordings of Boogadaboogadaboogada! and Punkhouse ep. The lineup consisted of Ben, Jughead, Vapid, Vermin, and Ward. After the show, Vapid discussed the idea of reforming Screeching Weasel with Jughead. All of the band's members agreed to reform, with the exceptions of Brian Vermin and Douglas Ward. To replace Vermin, drummer Dan Panic (Dan Sullivan) was brought in. Before recording their third studio album, My Brain Hurts (1991) for Lookout! Records, Weasel decided that he wanted to focus on singing and would no longer be playing guitar in the band. Vapid switched instruments from bass to guitar, and former Gore Gore Girls bassist Dave Naked joined the band. The recording sessions for the album also produced the extended play Pervo Devo.

After recording My Brain Hurts, Dave Naked was fired from the band and Scott "Gub" Conway, Panic's former bandmate, was brought in as the band's bassist to tour. After the tour, Johnny Personality of The Vindictives became the band's bassist, as Gub was committed to another band. By late 1992, the band had recorded the follow-up to My Brain Hurts, Wiggle, which also marked their first collaboration with producer Mass Giorgini, who also became the bassist of the band from 1998 to 2004. Personality then left the band to focus on The Vindictives. Instead of adding a new member, Weasel moved back to guitar, and Vapid moved back to bass. The band was then asked to record a cover of an entire Ramones album, Ramones (1992), followed later that year by Anthem for a New Tomorrow. Shortly after the record's release, Weasel decided that he no longer wanted to perform live, and Vapid left after falling out with Ben. After the release of How to Make Enemies and Irritate People (1994), the band broke up for the second time.

=== Second reformation (1996–2001) ===
Following the second breakup, Weasel, Vapid, and Panic formed the band the Riverdales and experienced some notoriety touring with Green Day. By 1996, they rejoined with Jughead and recorded a new Screeching Weasel album Bark Like a Dog for Fat Mike's Fat Wreck Chords label. The album peaked at number 34 on the Billboard Heatseekers chart, making it their highest-charting album. However, both Vapid and Panic left by mutual decision after the recording, and Weasel and Jughead decided to go on without them, adding bassist Mass Giorgini and drummer Dan Lumley, both from Squirtgun. Weasel also decided for the second time that he no longer wanted to play guitar, so guitarist Zac Damon was added.

In 1998, the group's new lineup recorded the Major Label Debut EP; the first release on Panic Button Records, a label Ben and John had formed that year and quickly followed it with Television City Dream. Their next release, 1999's Emo, featured the same lineup minus Zac Damon, who was unable to record due to school commitments at the time. In 2000 the band brought in Phillip Hill as a second guitarist and recorded what was intended to be their final album, Teen Punks in Heat. After the album, Screeching Weasel made their first live appearances since 1993, playing 30 minute matinees at Chicago's House of Blues. The band broke up for the third—and allegedly final—time on July 6, 2001, due to Jughead's frustration of a lack of touring.

=== Hiatus and brief third reformation (2001–2008) ===
After the third breakup, Jughead started a new band called Even in Blackouts, while Weasel released a solo album titled Fidatevi, and new Riverdales album, Phase Three.

Both Weasel and Jughead authored books seemingly related to Screeching Weasel. In 2001, Ben Weasel published Like Hell, the account of a fictional punk band called Pagan Icons and the life of their frontman, Joe Pagan. Jughead released Weasels in a Box, his admittedly fictionalized account of Screeching Weasel's history. Both books were published by Hope And Nonthings, a publishing house run by Jughead. Jughead also continued his membership with the Neo-Futurists, a theater group he has written and performed with since 1997, appearing in a show called Too Much Light Makes the Baby Go Blind.

In 2004, Ben reclaimed all of the Screeching Weasel masters from Lookout! Records in the wake of long-running financial and personal conflicts. The masters were subsequently licensed to and reissued by Asian Man Records. That same year a lineup consisting of Ben Weasel, Jughead, and multi-year Screeching Weasel veterans Dan Vapid, Mass Giorgini, and Dan Lumley came together to play surprise sets at the Chicago club The Fireside Bowl. According to Ben Weasel, there was an intention to tour that year, but "the offers just weren't there".

Ben released a second solo album, These Ones Are Bitter, in 2007, and gave his first solo live performance at that year's Insubordination Fest in Baltimore. During his set, backed up by The Guts, he was joined on stage by Dan Vapid for several Screeching Weasel and Riverdales songs. Ben Weasel and Dan Vapid also played two shows in August 2008 at Reggie's Rock Club in Chicago, playing the entirety of My Brain Hurts as well as other songs by Screeching Weasel, The Riverdales, and from Ben Weasel's solo albums.

=== Fourth reformation (2009–2011) ===
2009–2011

In March 2009, Ben Weasel announced on his blog that he had reformed Screeching Weasel. For the first time, the band featured a lineup without John Jughead, although longtime member Dan Vapid had rejoined. Ben wrote:

I really want to give you the lowdown on the SW re-formation but there's honestly not a lot to say. Legal issues prevented me from doing my own band on my own terms over the past couple of years but thankfully those problems are all resolved now. The kind of stuff happens sometimes. I won't deny that those problems – which were really just the culmination of many years of a lot of other b.s. - left a foul taste in my mouth about SW. But now that all the headaches are behind me I'm feeling great about it. I'm finally running my own band again and I'm really happy and excited to be back at it. I've got a killer line-up comprised of myself, Danny Vapid, Simon Lamb (the Ritalins), Justin Perkins (Yesterday's Kids) and Adam Cargin (Blueheels) (he's also the new Riverdales drummer) and we've got a great set list.

In response to the resurrection of the Screeching Weasel name without his involvement, Jughead released the following statement via his MySpace page:

If it weren't for the fact that I actually enjoy conversing with the fans of my prior bands, I would never have found out about a new band called Screeching Weasel beginning to tour. "This can't be the band I was in." I say to myself. "I would have been preparing." My mind would much prefer going to a place of calm contemplation than into a dark cold room filled with anger and the emotions associated with betrayal. So to avoid painful emoting I first took the facts that Ben and I started a band together called Screeching Weasel, we both spent all our days making that band a home for ourselves, and 18 years later we put it to rest. This along with the statement made by both me and Ben on many occasions that the band wouldn't be Screeching Weasel without either of us, makes me assume that this band playing isn't Screeching Weasel, because I don't recall having kicked myself out of the band. So it seems logical that this is not Screeching Weasel. If it were I would have to admit that I longer [sic] have friends named Ben Foster or Dan Schafer. As for people like Ben Weasel, Dan Vapid, or even John Jughead, I have nothing to say, because they never really existed, they were just made up names for a bunch of friends that tried to do something different in order to survive and make a living in this world. And I imagine they are all still trying to make a living somehow, seeing that their band's prominent "leader" never wanted to tour in order to make it financially viable to continue on.

Weasel later revealed the split with Jughead was the result of two-year-long legal battle over Screeching Weasel's business affairs and, although they were resolved, Weasel said "it was not an amicable split" and that "things had gone way, way past the point of no return in terms of our friendship and any semblance of a working relationship anymore".

In November 2009, Mike Park of Asian Man Records announced that Weasel had decided to sever his relationship with the label and that Recess Records would be carrying the Screeching Weasel, Riverdales and Ben Weasel solo back catalogues.

On November 30, 2010, Ben Weasel appeared on Last Call with Carson Daly to talk about his personal problems with anxiety disorders and agoraphobia.

On March 15, 2011, the band released its first album in eleven years, First World Manifesto on Fat Wreck Chords. It was produced by Mike Kennerty of The All-American Rejects. It was announced that the label will also be releasing the back catalogs of Screeching Weasel, the Riverdales, and Ben Weasel.

On March 18, 2011, during Screeching Weasel's South by Southwest Festival performance at the Scoot Inn in Austin, Texas, Foster punched a female audience member who had thrown a beer and ice cubes at him, and also spit in his face. As a result a woman on the stage, believed to be the club's owner, grabbed him from behind, and Ben mistaking her for an attacking fan turned around and punched her in the scuffle. Foster was then restrained by security and left the venue. On March 22, Foster apologized. On March 23, Punknews.org posted a statement from the four other members of Screeching Weasel, announcing their resignation from the band.

On March 31, Weasel announced the cancellation of "Weasel Fest", a 3-day event in honor of Screeching Weasel's 25th anniversary that had been scheduled to take place at Reggie's Rock Club in Chicago, after many of the other acts on the bill dropped out in the wake of the SXSW incident. In an interview published in July 2011, Fat Mike, owner of Fat Wreck Chords, stated that he had no interest in releasing another Screeching Weasel record, although the label might still reissue the band's back catalog.

=== New lineup (2011-present) ===
Despite speculation of a breakup, Screeching Weasel returned with a new lineup on October 29 at Reggie's Rock Club in Chicago with The Queers. The lineup included Ben Weasel-vocals, Zac Damon-guitar, Dave Klein-bass, Pierre Marche-drums and Mike Hunchback-rhythm guitar. A new 7-song EP, titled Carnival of Schadenfreude, was recorded in July 2011. It was also produced by Mike Kennerty and was released in November 2011 on Recess Records. In March 2013, Ben Weasel announced on the band's Facebook page that Dave Klein had split from the group amicably to join Black Flag. He was replaced by bassist Zach Brandner, AKA "Poutine."

On July 13, 2014, Weasel released a video on YouTube stating that new albums were in the works, through a two-part rock opera called Baby Fat. Baby Fat: Act 1 was crowd-funded, released in 2015 after the band raised over $40,000. As yet, Baby Fat: Act 2 has not been announced or released. At the end of 2016, Zac Damon was replaced by guitarist, Trevor Jackson.

A documentary on the band was in the works for several years, but was cancelled in 2012, with producers citing Weasel's lack of cooperation with production. Screeching Weasel announced in March 2017 that a new documentary was underway entitled My Right: The Screeching Weasel Story. They recorded and digitally released two singles on December 11, 2017, entitled "Christmas Eve" and "New Years Eve" and played several shows in 2018. They subsequently announced via their website that a new album was scheduled to be recorded in summer 2019 with a tour in 2020 to follow.

On March 24, 2020, Screeching Weasel released their 13th album, Some Freaks of Atavism and on July 15, 2022, Screeching Weasel released their 14th album, The Awful Disclosures of Screeching Weasel with producer Mike Kennerty replacing Trevor Jackson as guitarist/backing vocalist. Both records were well-received by their fans and critics.

The band remains active, though tour plans were postponed for a number of years due to the COVID-19 pandemic, with their last shows prior being played in 2019. In 2024, they announced plans to resume live shows in 2025 and shows scheduled in Chicago for March 2025 sold out in less than 1 hour. 2025 also brought about the addition of new Italian guitarist, Ginger Panero. Ben Weasel has stated, "Screeching Weasel is never breaking up again. The band dies when I do."

== Musical style and legacy ==
In addition to the Ramones, Ben Weasel credits bands such as Black Flag, D.O.A., The Dickies and Zero Boys for laying the groundwork for Screeching Weasel. Much like the Ramones, Screeching Weasel's common lyrical themes include girls and mental health problems (Weasel suffered from anxiety). While Weasel has been the sole writer of the majority of the band's catalogue, a number of songs credit Vapid, Jughead, or The Queers' frontman Joe King as co-writers.

Many subsequent punk and pop punk bands who have experienced mainstream success cite Screeching Weasel as an influence. Blink-182, who covered the band's song "The Girl Next Door" on their album Buddha, their guitarist Tom Delonge cites them as one of the biggest influences on his songwriting. Other influenced bands include Green Day (whose bassist Mike Dirnt previously played in Screeching Weasel), The All-American Rejects (whose guitarist Mike Kennerty produced First World Manifesto, Carnival of Schadenfreude, Baby Fat -Act I, Some Freaks of Atavism and The Awful Disclosures of Screeching Weasel), New Found Glory, Eve 6, Bowling for Soup, MxPx, fellow Chicago bands Rise Against, Fall Out Boy, Allister, and Alkaline Trio, and popular ska punk band Less Than Jake.

Additionally, a number of independent punk bands such as The Apers, Bigwig, The Leftovers, The Manges, and The Unlovables cite Screeching Weasel as influential. Screeching Weasel has been categorized as skate punk, pop punk and punk rock.

== Band members ==
Current members

- Ben Weasel – lead vocals, guitar (1986–1989, 1991–1994, 1996–2001, 2004, 2009–present); bass (1986)
- Pierre Marche – drums, percussion (2011–present)
- Mike Hunchback – guitar (2011–present)
- Zach "Poutine" Brandner – bass guitar, backing vocals (2013–present)
- Gianluca "Ginger" Panero – guitar, backing vocals (2025–present)

Former members

- Jughead – guitar, backing vocals (1986–1989, 1991–1994, 1996–2001, 2004)
- Vinnie Bovine – bass guitar (1986–1988)
- Steve Cheese – drums, percussion (1986–1988)
- Warren Fish – bass guitar (1988–1989)
- Brian Vermin – drums, percussion (1988–1989)
- Dan Vapid – bass guitar, guitar, backing vocals (1989, 1991–1994, 1996, 2004, 2009–2011)
- Doug Ward – guitar (1989)
- Dave Naked – bass guitar (1991–1992)
- Scott "Gub" Conway – bass guitar (1992)
- Dan Panic – drums, percussion (1991–1994, 1996)
- Johnny Personality – bass guitar, backing vocals (1992)
- Mass Giorgini – bass guitar, backing vocals (1994, 1996–2001, 2004)
- Mike Dirnt – bass guitar, backing vocals (1994)
- Dan Lumley – drums, percussion (1996–2001, 2004)
- Phillip Hill – guitar, backing vocals (2000–2001)
- Simon Lamb – guitar (2009–2010)
- Justin Perkins – bass guitar, backing vocals, percussion (2009–2011)
- Adam Cargin – drums, percussion (2009–2011)
- Drew Fredrichsen – guitar, backing vocals (2010–2011)
- Dave Klein – bass guitar (2011–2013)
- Zac Damon – guitar, backing vocals (1997–1998, 2011–2016)
- Trevor Jackson – guitar, backing vocals (2017–2022)
- Mike Kennerty - guitar, backing vocals (2022-2025)

== Discography ==
=== Studio albums ===
- Screeching Weasel (Underdog Records, 1987)
- Boogadaboogadaboogada! (Roadkill Records, 1988)
- My Brain Hurts (Lookout! Records, 1991)
- Ramones (Selfless Records, 1992)
- Wiggle (Lookout! Records, 1993)
- Anthem for a New Tomorrow (Lookout! Records, 1993)
- How to Make Enemies and Irritate People (Lookout! Records, 1994)
- Bark Like a Dog (Fat Wreck Chords, 1996)
- Television City Dream (Fat Wreck Chords, 1998)
- Emo (Panic Button Records, 1999)
- Teen Punks in Heat (Panic Button Records, 2000)
- First World Manifesto (Fat Wreck Chords, 2011)
- Baby Fat: Act I (Recess Records, 2015)
- Some Freaks of Atavism (Monona Music, 2020)
- The Awful Disclosures of Screeching Weasel (Monona Music, 2022)

=== EPs, singles, and splits ===
- Screeching Weasel / Moving Targets split with Moving Targets (What Goes On Records, 1988) [Promo-only Release]
- Punkhouse (Limited Potential Records, 1989)
- Pervo Devo (Shred of Dignity Records, 1991)
- Snappy Answers to Stupid Questions (Selfless Records, 1992)
- Happy, Horny, Gay and Sassy (Selfless Records, 1992)
- Screeching Weasel / Pink Lincolns split with Pink Lincolns (VML Records, 1993)
- "Radio Blast" (Underdog Records, 1993)
- You Broke My Fucking Heart (Lookout! Records, 1993)
- Screeching Weasel / Born Against split 7-inch/CD with Born Against (Lookout! Records, 1993)
- "Suzanne Is Getting Married" (Lookout! Records, 1994)
- Formula 27 (Vermiform Records, 1996)
- Major Label Debut (Panic Button Records, 1998)
- Jesus Hates You (Panic Button Records, 1999)
- Carnival of Schadenfreude (Recess Records, 2011)
- Christmas Eve / New Years Eve (Monona Music, 2017)

=== Compilation albums ===
- Kill the Musicians (Lookout! Records, 1995)
- Beat Is on the Brat (Panic Button Records, 1998)
- Thank You Very Little (Panic Button Records, 2000)
- Weasel Mania (Fat Wreck Chords, 2005)
- All Night Garage Sale (Monona Records, 2018)
- Suburban Vermin (Monona Records, 2020)

=== Compilation appearances ===
- Innocence Is Bliss: A 17 Band Punk Sampler (Wasted Effort Production, 1986)
- They Don't Get Laid, They Don't Get Paid, But Boy, Do They Work Hard (Maximum RockNRoll, 1989)
- What Are You Pointing At? (Very Small Records, 1989)
- It's A Punk Thing, You Wouldn't Understand (Shakefork Records, 1993)
- Four Two Pudding (Very Small Records, 1993)
- They Came, They Played, They Blocked The Driveway (WFMU, 1993)
- Fallen Upon Deaf Ears (Skullduggery Records, 1994)
- Chairman Of The Board (Grass Records, 1994)
- Physical Fatness (Fat Wreck Chords, 1997)
- Four On the Floor (Panic Button Records, 1998)
- Punk USA (Lookout! Records, 1998)
- Short Music for Short People (Fat Wreck Chords, 1999)
- Life In The Fat Lane (Fat Wreck Chords, 1999)
- Return of the Read Menace (Honest Don's Records, 1999)
- God Save The Queers (Asian Man Records, 2008)
- Jennifer's Body: Music From The Original Motion Picture (Fueled By Ramen, 2009)
- Wrecktrospective (Fat Wreck Chords, 2009)
- Authorities Tribute E.P. (Get Hip Recordings, 2012)
