= Material Issue =

American power pop band

Background information
- Origin: Chicago, Illinois, U.S.
- Genres: Power pop; pop rock
- Years active: 1985–1996
- Labels: Mercury, Rykodisc
- Past members: Jim Ellison; Ted Ansani; Mike Zelenko

Material Issue was an American power pop trio from Chicago, Illinois. The band's trademark is pop songs with themes of love and heartbreak. A number of their song titles used women's first names.

== History ==
Material Issue was formed in 1985, led by frontman Jim Ellison, who played guitar, sang lead vocals, and wrote most of the band's songs. Ellison met bassist Ted Ansani while both were attending Columbia College Chicago in 1986. Drummer Mike Zelenko was found through an ad in the Illinois Entertainer later that year.

In 1987, Material Issue released an eponymous EP on their own label, Big Block. The label operated out of Ellison's bedroom at his parents' home in Addison, Illinois, and was named for the big block engines of the 1970s muscle cars Ellison loved. In 1988, their song "Sixteen Tambourines" appeared on CMJ New Music Report's compilation and their music was described by CMJ as a "hooky brand of high-powered psycho-pop". In 1989, Material Issue released the single "Renee Remains The Same", which received heavy airplay around Chicago.

Over the next two years, the band toured extensively across the Midwest and recorded what would become their debut album International Pop Overthrow. The album was a compilation of various demos recorded between roughly 1988 and 1991 and produced by Jeff Murphy from the Chicago-area power pop band Shoes, and recorded at Short Order Recorder, their studio in Zion, Illinois. The album was released nationally in early 1991 and sold over 300,000 copies for Mercury Records. Their debut video for the single "Diane" appeared on MTV's 120 Minutes in late December 1990. International Pop Overthrow had extensive national exposure with "Valerie Loves Me" and "Diane" and music critic Jae-Ha Kim declared "Simple Minds upstaged by Material Issue".

The band's follow up album, 1992's Destination Universe, was also produced by Jeff Murphy at Short Order Recorder, and included the single "What Girls Want" in addition to ballads such as "Next Big Thing" and "Everything". Material Issue continued to tour heavily across the country in support of both albums. The new album was not as well received by critics, nor did it sell as well as their first.

1994's Freak City Soundtrack featured the single "Kim The Waitress", a cover of a 1980s single by The Green Pajamas, and written by Jeff Kelly. Freak City Soundtrack sold fewer than 50,000 copies and Material Issue, feeling left behind by their label, parted ways with Mercury in early 1995.

Material Issue continued touring, selling out venues throughout the upper Midwest. In the summer of 1995 the band co-headlined the first Edgefest festival in Somerset, Wisconsin. In 1995, the group, with Liz Phair, recorded a cover of "The Tra La La Song" for the tribute album Saturday Morning: Cartoons' Greatest Hits, produced by Ralph Sall for MCA Records. Throughout the remainder of 1995 and into 1996, Material Issue recorded a set of new songs with the intention of shopping them to a new label. However, Ellison died by suicide on June 20, 1996 by carbon monoxide poisoning in his garage. A note was found by police, the contents of which were not released publicly. The recordings from 1995 and 1996 were released posthumously on Telecommando Americano in 1997 by Rykodisc as the final Material Issue release, along with the band's six-song debut EP from 1987 as a bonus.

== Legacy ==
The legacy of Material Issue lives on in the International Pop Overthrow festival that plays in Los Angeles, New York City and Chicago each year. The IPO festival (renamed IPO from Poptopia in the late 90s to honor Material Issue) is the largest showcase of power pop music in the United States and brings in power pop bands from all over the world to showcase what is new in the world of power pop music.

Ted Ansani continues to work in the music business in Chicago and had played bass for several post-Material Issue projects and released his own solo EP in 2000 called Throttle and Pistons - The Ted Ansani Project. He has made several solo appearances in the last few years in and around Chicago and has also played the IPO festival when it has come to Chicago. His website carries the banner of the Material Issue legacy which reminds readers of Material Issue's place in rock history. Ansani is married with three children.

Mike Zelenko continues to play drums and has also played with several current Material Issue projects. He has drummed for Green, the Darlings and most recently Zelenko has been playing with a new power pop band from Chicago called The Ladies and Gentlemen.

In 2002, the song "Everything", from the Destination Universe album, was covered by the band Stereo Fuse and received moderate airplay on alternative radio.

The Tragically Hip song "Escape Is At Hand For The Travellin' Man", from the album Phantom Power, is a tribute to Ellison.

Australian power pop band the Pyramidiacs also released a tribute song to Ellison, entitled "Jim", on their 1997 album Teeter Totter.

Original drummer Danny Thompson is currently playing for punk rock band Face to Face and metal band the Uprising. The original bassist, Lance Tawzer, went on to form The Lupins (RCA Records) and wrote a song for the movie Dumb and Dumber; he married Q101 (WKQX) DJ Samantha James and they have two children.

In 2018, it was announced via Facebook that a feature-length documentary was in production with the band as the subject. The film, titled Out of Time: The Material Issue Story was released in 2021 through Factory 25. The documentary features people like, Jeff Kwatinetz, Matt Pinfield, Steve Albini, Mike Chapman, and the original members of the band.

== Material Reissue ==
In 2011, to commemorate the 20th anniversary of the International Pop Overthrow album, the two surviving members, Mike Zelenko and Ted Ansani, reformed the band under the name Material Reissue. Chicago based singer-songwriter Phil Angotti (who had recorded as The Idea) joined them, filling in for Jim Ellison. The show was part of the International Pop Overthrow festival, named after the album, and took place at the Abbey Pub in Chicago on April 23, 2011. Material Reissue then performed at the Taste of Chicago on June 28, 2011, at Summerfest in Milwaukee on July 8, 2011, and Lincoln Hall on September 17, 2011. They performed in what was billed as their final show ever on December 31 at Reggie's Rock Club. However the band has continued to perform live occasionally since that time.

International Pop Overthrow was also re-issued in a 20th Anniversary edition.

== Discography ==
=== Albums ===
- International Pop Overthrow (1991)
- Destination Universe (1992)
- Freak City Soundtrack (1994)
- Telecommando Americano (1997)

=== EPs ===
- Material Issue (Big Block/Landmine) (1987)
- Blockbuster (Mercury) (1991)

=== Live ===
- Goin' Through Your Purse : Live (2400 Troublemakers Can't Be Wrong) (1994) album

=== Singles ===
Year	Title	Chart positions	Album
Year	Title	US Modern Rock	Album
1988	"Renee Remains The Same"/"The Girl Who Never Ever Falls In Love"	-	The Super Sonic Seven Inch 7"
1991	"Valerie Loves Me"	3	International Pop Overthrow
1991	"Diane"	6	International Pop Overthrow
1992	"What Girls Want"	6	Destination Universe
1994	"Kim the Waitress"	20	Freak City Soundtrack

"Goin' Through Your Purse" charted on the Radio and Records Alternative chart, peaking at #30 in September 1994.

=== Compilations ===
- The Best of Material Issue (Mercury) (2006)

=== Compilation appearances ===
Year	Track title	Album
1987	"Chance Of A Lifetime"	Hog Butcher For The World
1988	"Echo Beach"	Keeping Score EP
1988	"Sixteen Tambourines"	College Music Journal Sampler
1991	"Little Willy" (The Sweet cover)	20 Explosive Dynamic Super Smash Hit Explosions!
1991	"Merry Christmas Will Do"	Yuletunes - A Collection of Alternative Pop Christmas Songs
1994	"Something's Happened to Catherine"	Yellow Pills Volume 2
1994	"Run To Me" (Bee Gees cover)	Melody Fair: A Bee Gees Tribute
1995	"Bus Stop" (The Hollies cover)	Sing Hollies In Reverse
1995	"The Problem With Jill"	Yellow Pills Volume 3
1995	"The Tra La La Song (One Banana, Two Banana)" (with Liz Phair) (Banana Splits cover)	Saturday Morning: Cartoons' Greatest Hits
1997	"I'd Wait A Million Years" (The Grass Roots cover)	Yellow Pills Volume 4

=== Video appearances ===
- Rockin' Tonight DVD-V/PAL (MCP Sound & Media) (2005) - "What Girls Want"
- Hard 'N' Heavy DVD-V (Delta Entertainment) (2006) - "What Girls Want"
- Rockin' Avantgarde DVD-V/PAL (Delta Entertainment) (2006) - "What Girls Want"
