= Jim Ellison =

Frontman for the band Material Issue

- Born: James Walter Ellison; April 18, 1964
- Died: June 20, 1996 (age 32)
- Genre: Power pop
- Formerly of: Material Issue

James Walter Ellison (April 18, 1964–June 20, 1996) was the frontman for the band Material Issue. He tirelessly promoted his band, booked tours, and secured a major-label deal in 1990. Ellison—along with bassist Ted Ansani and drummer Mike Zelenko—would lead the renaissance of power pop in the early 1990s.

== Personal life and legacy ==
Ellison grew up in Illinois and attended Glenbard North High School.

He died on June 20, 1996, from suicide. Gord Downie, lead singer of The Tragically Hip, wrote the song "Escape Is at Hand for the Travelin' Man" about his relationship with Ellison, and about Downie's grief after Ellison's death. The song was recorded by The Tragically Hip.
