= Stikky =

American punk rock band

- Origin: Santa Clara, California, United States
- Genres: Punk rock, hardcore punk, Powerviolence
- Years active: 1985-1990
- Labels: Lookout!, Sound Pollution, Slap-a-Ham
- Members: Todd "Spiderman" Wilder; Chris Wilder; Chris Dodge
- Past members: James Porter

Stikky was an American hardcore punk band, formed in Santa Clara, California in 1985. The band was part of the 924 Gilman Street-scene. The group originally formed with the line-up of Todd Wilder (lead vocals/drums), Chris Wilder (guitar/vocals), and James Porter (bass/vocals). Porter left Stikky in 1987 and was replaced by former No Use for a Name guitarist Chris Dodge. Along with Southern California-based bands Infest and No Comment, they were among the earliest acts to create the hardcore punk hybrid known as powerviolence. This style took the essence of hardcore and grindcore, mixing bursts of ferocity with slower sections more akin to sludge metal. Stikky's songs are known for being hardcore punk yet still retaining the sense of humor that East Bay bands were known for. After the band stopped playing with any regularity, bassist Chris Dodge released some of their material on his own record label Slap a Ham Records.

== History ==
Stikky formed in Santa Clara, California in July 1985 with Todd Wilder playing drums and singing, his older brother Chris on guitar/backing vocals and James Porter on bass. The group recorded a 9-song demo in 1985, and then a 12 track demo in 1986. Porter left Stikky in June 1987 and was replaced by future No Use for a Name guitarist Chris Dodge. The band was later featured on a number of compilation albums including Maximumrocknroll's Turn It Around! (1987), Lookout! Records' The Thing That Ate Floyd (1988) and Very Small Records' Bay Mud (1989) and Lethal Noise, Vol. 2 (1989). During Stikky's active years it was common for them, Crimpshrine, Isocracy, Operation Ivy, Corrupted Morals, Sweet Baby Jesus, or The Lookouts to open a bill for a touring punk band almost every weekend at 924 Gilman Street.

Each member of the band has expressed repeatedly that Stikky never officially broke up and is indeed still a band, though they have not played together since 1990. All of the members are close and dear friends and have hinted at the possibility of a reunion.

A posthumous anthology of most recordings of the band, titled Spamthology: Volume 1, was released in 1997 and is now out of print.

== Discography ==
Studio albums

- Where's My Lunchpail? - Lookout Records (1988)

EPs

- Cuddle - Off the Disk (1988)
- I & I & That Guy Over There - Pintonium AG (1989)

Compilation albums

- Spamthology: Volume One - Sound Pollution (1997)

Other appearances

- "Ja Hova's Guys" and "8 Hour Shift" on Bay Mud - David Hayes self-released cassette (1986)
- "Republican Children" and "On Top O' Da World" on Lethal Noise, Vol. 2 - David Hayes self-released (1987)
- "Fun on the Freeway" and "Moshometer" on Turn It Around! - Maximumrocknroll (1987)
- "T.V. Repairman" on We've Got Your Shorts - Fascist Food Records (1987)
- "Don't Lick My Leg" on The Thing That Ate Floyd - Lookout! Records (1989)

== Band members ==
Members

- Todd Wilder - drums, lead vocals (1985-1990)
- Chris Wilder - guitar, vocals (1985-1990)
- Chris Dodge - bass, vocals (1987-1990)

Former members

- James Porter - bass, vocals (1985-1987)
