= Kamala Parks =

American drummer and songwriter

Kamala Lyn Parks
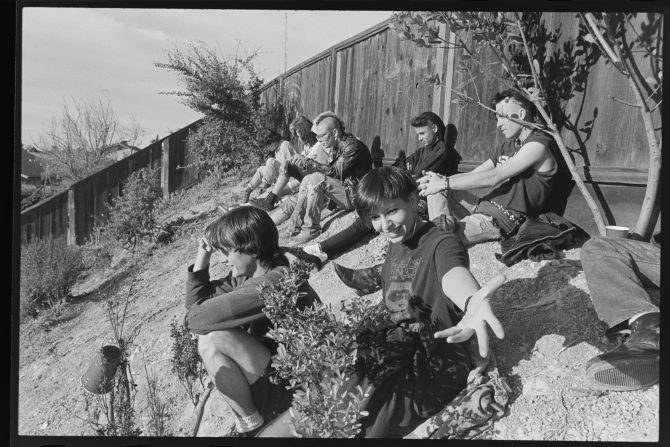
- Parks at a backyard show in Pinole, California in 1989
- Born: Bakersfield, California
- Education: BA Math (1996); MS Civil Engineering and MCP Planning (2005)
- Alma mater: Mills College, U.C. Berkeley
- Occupation(s): Drummer, Musician, Songwriter, Transportation Planner

Kamala Lyn Parks is an American drummer, songwriter, tour booker, and author from Berkeley, California. She played drums for Kamala & The Karnivores (with Ivy DuBois of Sweet Baby, Lynda Skulpone, and Michelle Cruz Gonzales of Bitch Fight and Spitboy), Cringer, The Gr’ups, Naked Aggression, Hers Never Existed, and Plot 66.

In 1986, Victor Hayden and Kamala partnered with Maximumrocknroll to establish 924 Gilman Street, an all-ages collectively organized music venue in Berkeley. She was instrumental in finding the warehouse in North Berkeley that became home to the local punk scene. She also actively participated in the city council meeting for the venue's zoning approval. For years, she booked shows at Gilman, while also cultivating a national tour network for punk bands such as Operation Ivy, Neurosis, the Offspring, and Citizen Fish.

She starred in and acted as a consultant for the 2018 movie Turn It Around: The Story of East Bay Punk. She wrote extensively for Maximumrocknroll and contributed a story to the Berkeley Repertory Theater 2021 audio series, Place/Settings: Berkeley, read by actor Denmo Ibrahim.

She currently works as a transportation planner for the San Francisco Bay Area Rapid Transit (BART) District and is married to musician Frank Piegaro Jr.

== Discography ==
=== Kamala & the Karnivores (1985-1989, reunited 2016-2018) ===
- Vanity Project (Song Preserve, 2018)
- "Back To Bodie" in the Turn It Around: The Story of East Bay Punk soundtrack (1, 2, 3, 4 Go Records, 2018)
- Girl Band 7-inch EP (Lookout Records, 1989)
- "Tiny Steps" in the Typical Girls: Volume 5 compilation (Emotional Response, 2020)

=== The Gr'ups (1991-1993, reunited 2010-2011) ===
- The Gr'ups 7-inch EP (Immature Records, Zafio Records, 1992)
- Buildings Are The Purtiest Trees I've Seen 7-inch EP (Zafio Records, Duotone Records, 1993)
- A Li'l Lost 1992-1994 (Recess Records, 2011)

=== Cringer ===
- Time for a Little Something... 7-inch EP (Vinyl Communications, 1990)
- I Take My Desires for Reality LP (Full Circle, 1991)
- Rain 7-inch EP (Vinyl Communications, 1991)
- Cringer/Hopeful Monsters Split 7-inch EP (Hippycore Records, 1990)
- "Burn Down the Forest" in the More Songs About Plants and Trees 7-inch EP compilation (Allied Recordings, 1990)

=== Naked Aggression ===
- Bitter Youth LP (Broken Rekids, 1993)

=== Hers Never Existed ===
- You're Beautiful 7-inch EP (Big Mama Records, 1998)
- Hers Never Existed LP (El Sábado Records/New Disorder Records, 2001)

=== Plot 66 ===
- Plot 66 7-inch EP (self-released on Bandcamp)
