= The Rotten Agenda =

Studio album by Aus-Rotten
- Released: December 3, 2001
- Recorded: 2000, New York City, United States
- Genre: Hardcore punk Crust punk Anarcho-punk
- Length: 36:29
- Label: Rotten Propaganda Records

Aus-Rotten chronology
...And Now Back to Our Programming (1998)	The Rotten Agenda (2001)

The Rotten Agenda is the third and final studio album by the American hardcore punk band Aus-Rotten, released in 2001 on Rotten Propaganda Records. The record label bears the name of lead vocalist/lyricist Dave Trenga's anarchist DIY newspaper Rotten Propaganda.

== Title ==
The album's title itself is a word play on the Crass collective, the Crass Agenda, as well as the phrase "Gay Agenda" often used by many right-wing conservative pundits in the United States.

== Lyrics and themes ==
The Rotten Agenda focuses thematically on sexual issues such as LGBT rights and sexism. However, the album does also discuss other left-wing topics of previous Aus-Rotten recordings such as animal rights, media control and racism in the United States. The album calls out the fundamentalist Christian Right in America (namely figureheads Jerry Falwell, Pat Robertson, D. James Kennedy) as being the orchestrators of perpetual, institutionalized homophobia. The opening title track features an imitation of James Kennedy wherein "he" declares—amidst a choir of "Sieg Heil"'s in the background—that the Christian Right is a conspiracy to spread misinformation and "to dismantle all gay and lesbian groups."

"World Bank," "Tax Shelter" and "Media Blackout" had previously appeared on the band's last studio album. Spitboy vocalist Adrienne Droogas returns again to guest on "The Second Rape" and "Isolation or Solution," after previously making her debut with Aus-Rotten on their 1999 LP ...And Now Back To Our Programming.

Aus-Rotten broke up shortly after the album's release with Dave Trenga continuing on to the more metallic and even more polemic Behind Enemy Lines, and Eric Good going on to front Caustic Christ.

== Track listing ==
=== Side A ===
1. The Rotten Agenda - 1:11
2. Modern Day Witch Hunt - 4:18
3. Right Wing Warfare - 3:43
4. World Bank - 2:30
5. Factory - 2:32
6. The Second Rape - 4:40

=== Side B ===
1. Plausible Deniability - 1:59
2. Who's Calling the Shots? - 2:44
3. Capital Punishment - 2:34
4. Absent Minded - 2:10
5. Isolation or Solution - 3:02
6. Tax Shelter - 3:01
7. Media Blackout - 2:13

== Personnel ==
- Dave Trenga – lead vocals
- Eric Good – lead guitar, vocals
- Matt Garabedian - drums
- Corey Lyons - bass
- Adrienne Droogas - vocals on tracks 6, 11
