= Quit Talkin' Claude... =

EP by Crimpshrine
- Released: April 1989
- Recorded: January 1989
- Studio: Dancing Dog Studios in Emeryville, California
- Genre: Punk rock
- Length: 14:01
- Label: Lookout (LK 015)
- Producer: Kevin Army

Crimpshrine chronology
Lame Gig Contest (1989)	Quit Talkin' Claude... (1989)

Quit Talkin' Claude... is the final studio release by the Berkeley, California-based punk rock band Crimpshrine. It was released in April 1989, a month before the band's break-up, through Lookout Records with the catalog number LK 015. The EP showed a change in sound for the band, featuring longer songs, more personal lyrics and psychedelic influence in the guitar work. Many of the musical elements on the EP would be featured in the band members' later projects, including Fifteen, Pinhead Gunpowder and Cleveland Bound Death Sentence.

Much like Sleep, What's That?, the group's previous EP, Quit Talkin' Claude... went out of print around 1992. After being unavailable for several years, the tracks from the EP were compiled on the album The Sound of a New World Being Born in 1998, which has also gone out of print with the closure of Lookout Records. Despite not being received as well by fans as Sleep, What's That?, the EP has been regarded as a classic Lookout Records release in recent years.

== Background and recording ==
In April 1988, shortly after hiring new guitarist Idon Bryant, Crimpshrine went to Dancing Dog Studios in Emeryville, California with Kevin Army to record its debut full-length. However, the recordings were rejected by Lookout Records, so the group scrapped them and later embarked on its only US tour in September. The tour was contentious and due to tensions within the group, Bryant and bassist Pete Rypins left the band abruptly after a show in Texas and went home, leaving guitarist/vocalist Jeff Ott and drummer Aaron Elliot stranded. The two called friends Ben Weasel and John Jughead of Screeching Weasel, who drove down from Chicago to fill in until Ott and Elliot found replacement members. Elliot also played drums with Screeching Weasel (who had just fired their drummer Steve Cheese) for two shows around the same time. Deciding to eschew a second guitarist, Ott and Elliot later hired Paul Curran as their new bassist, and he and his brother Jack Curran drove out to Gainesville, Florida in a Ford Pinto to finish the tour. After the tour ended in December 1988, the group released the recordings from the aforementioned session (with other unreleased songs) on the label Musical Tragedies as Lame Gig Contest. The next month, the group went back to Dancing Dog Studios with Army to record what would be their last batch of songs. The Quit Talkin' Claude... EP was released in April 1989 and, a month later, the band had decided to break up.

== Track listing ==
All music is composed by Crimpshrine.

Side one
No.	Title	Lyrics	Length
1.	"Butterflies"	Aaron Elliot	4:19
2.	"Situation"	Jeff Ott	2:52

Side two
No.	Title	Lyrics	Length
3.	"Easy Answers"	Elliot	2:48
4.	"Inspiration"	Ott	4:01
Total length:			14:01

== Personnel ==
- Jeff Ott – lead vocals, guitar
- Paul Curran – bass, backing vocals
- Aaron Elliot – drums, tambourine

Production

- Kevin Army – producer, engineer
- Lord Ed; Idon Bryant; Cuba – photography
- Bobby Madness – artwork
