= It's a Girl! =

Studio album by Sweet Baby
- Released: January 1989
- Recorded: 1988
- Studio: Dancing Dog Studios in Emeryville, California; Sergay's Recording Emporium in Berkeley, California
- Genre: Pop punk, punk rock
- Length: 25:17
- Label: Ruby; Lookout (LK 157); Eccentric Pop (EP 15)
- Producer: Kevin Army and Sweet Baby

It's a Girl! is the only studio album by Berkeley-based pop punk band Sweet Baby. It was originally released on vinyl and cassette in January 1989 through Ruby Records, a subsidiary of Slash Records/Warner Music Group.

Following a brief break-up, the group reconvened in 1988 after its engineer Kevin Army had sent the band's demo to Matt Wallace of Slash Records, signing the group to its subsidiary label Ruby. The album achieved poor sales and limited reception upon its initial release, due in part to its limited press run. Its release was followed by a disastrous tour of the United States. After recording demos for a possible subsequent album, the group was dropped by Ruby and broke up later that year.

The album gained a cult following when Lookout Records licensed the recordings and re-released it on CD in 1996 along with the rest of Sweet Baby's recorded output. After the band removed its catalog from Lookout due to unpaid royalties, the album remained out of print until it was reissued on vinyl in remastered form by Eccentric Pop Records in 2015 to commemorate its 25th anniversary. The reissue also included a bonus 7-inch EP of two studio outtakes and two live recordings.

== Background and recording ==
Originally called Sweet Baby Jesus, the band is often regarded as one of the founders of the punk scene in the Bay Area centered around the 924 Gilman Street venue in Berkeley. Although the band played live frequently during this time, its music was rarely recorded, only appearing on compilation albums such as Maximumrocknroll's Turn It Around!. In November 1987, the band had decided to break up, as vocalist Dallas Denery wanted to go to graduate school and guitarist Matt Buenrostro intended to emigrate to England. A week later, the band decided to record its music as a "memento" to remember the band, so they recorded a demo called Never Mind the Bassets, It's the Sweet Baby Jesus at Dangerous Rhythm Studios in Oakland with producer/engineer Kevin Army and handed it out to friends. Unknown to the band, Army sent the cassette to friend Matt Wallace of Slash Records, who liked the demo and signed Sweet Baby Jesus to Ruby Records, a subsidiary of Slash. Once word got out of the deal, labels such as Lookout and Boner Records also offered to sign them, but Slash offered the group "$10,000 or $20,000" which, according to Denery, was "pretty hard to pass up." Although signing to a major label (as Slash is a subsidiary of Warner Music Group) was generally met with negative reactions in the 924 Gilman Street punk scene, most of the band's contemporaries and friends did not accuse the band of "selling out". Jeff Ott of the band Crimpshrine would later say "They always seemed out of place, so when they went and did the record deal thing, everybody was like, 'Well, they were always kinda their own thing anyway.' Even though they were one of us, totally, somehow there was just no badness to it at all", while Lookout Records co-owner Larry Livermore said "Maybe it was because Sweet Baby had never specifically cast themselves in the role of 'punks', or that they were such nice guys it was hard to imagine getting mad at them."

The band then dropped the "Jesus" from its name, as Buenrostro and drummer Sergie Loobkoff reportedly did not like it, and began recording the album "live" at Dancing Dog Studios in Emeryville, California in late 1988. Buenrostro described these recordings as "kind of sloppy" and "Telephone Booth" would be the only song from these initial sessions to be put on the album. Afterwards, the group started laying down basic tracks at Sergay's Recording Emporium in Berkeley with only Buenrostro's backing vocals and Loobkoff's drums; this saved the band money as it was cheaper than Dancing Dog's rates. Overdubs were then recorded back at Dancing Dog and mixed together there. The intro for "Baby Baby Baby Baby Baby Baby Baby (I Love You)" came about as Buenrostro had found a tin whistle in the studio and was attempting to play "Stairway to Heaven" by Led Zeppelin on it before realizing the band was recording. Loobkoff later described his drumming as "bad" and admitted that Army "had to get a razor blade and chop every drum hit and move it over". Buenrostro, however, would say that "with a few exceptions, like having multiple guitar tracks and a consistent drum tempo, we felt like the final version was not too far removed from if we had played a live set perfectly" and described the recording as a "blast".

== Release and reception ==
Professional ratings
Review scores
Source	Rating
AllMusic	4.5/5 stars
Chicago Tribune	2.5/4 stars

Upon release, the album received very little attention and poor sales, due in part to Ruby not printing the album on CD and from only 1,000 copies of the initial 10,000 pressing run making it to stores. One of the only contemporary reviews for the album came from Tim Yohannan of Maximumrocknroll, who said in the March 1989 issue that the band had "cleaned up their sound since the tracks on Turn It Around!, but still have that catchy pop sound and great short songs". Yohannan also said that while "previously they reminded me of a cross between the Ramones and The Beatles, they veered more towards the latter on this major label debut release." The Chicago Tribune stated that "the songs are about Girls! Girls! Girls! and they all rock like crazy, with buzzsaw guitars, amphetamine-induced bass lines and galloping drums." In a retrospective review, Stewart Mason of AllMusic called the music "bubblegum punk as goofily sweet as the band name and album title". While acknowledging the influence of the Buzzcocks on the music, Mason also claimed that Sweet Baby "owe more to the unfettered pop glee of the British Invasion bands (and for that matter, the Rutles and the sweeter side of the Ramones) than to their proto-grunge contemporaries".

Despite the poor sales and lack of reception, the album was nominated for "Best California Debut Album of the Year" at the Bay Area Music Awards that year, but lost to Bad English's self-titled debut. Denery would later say "Maybe you had to be from the Bay Area to realize how depressing it would be to lose out to a bunch of Journey rejects, and have to buy your drinks all on the same night. Then again, maybe not."

Shortly after the album's release, the band embarked upon a 3-month tour of the United States. For the tour, Bucher and Loobkoff were replaced by Ivy DuBois of Kamala and the Karnivores and Aaron Cometbus of Crimpshrine. However, the group's A&R representative had been fired from Slash Records shortly before the tour began and the band was assigned a new one who "never even liked us", according to Denery. "They didn’t understand the scene. They didn’t care." The band's new A&R representative became their tour manager and, because of his dislike for the band, reportedly "sabotaged" the tour by not telling the band where they would be playing or giving the members incorrect dates for shows, resulting in numerous cancellations. Once the tour commenced, the group began recording demos with their new line-up for a possible second album (to be titled Submarine Races). However, Ruby was dissatisfied with the demos, and as a result dropped the group from the label, after which the band broke up.

== Legacy ==
Renewed interest in Sweet Baby's music was brought in the mid-90s when the band was asked to reform for a performance at 924 Gilman Street. Although they refused, Denery had begun playing the band's songs with a new band The Bomb Bassets, featuring his brother John (at the time in The Hi-Fives), Dr. Frank of The Mr. T Experience (who was also Sweet Baby's original drummer) and Kevin Army. As a result, Lookout Records licensed It's a Girl from Ruby and re-released it on CD for the first time in 1996, along with another CD release of tracks from the band's Never Mind the Bassets demo as a split album with the band Brent's TV (which also featured John Denery). According to Lookout president Chris Appelgren, the deal with Ruby was "pretty easy, we just had to pay a royalty to license it as well as contact the Warner Bros. folks to see if they were interested in doing their own reissue." The Lookout CD release of It's a Girl sold far more than it did on initial release, gaining the band a minor cult following. After Sweet Baby removed its catalog from Lookout in the 2000s due to unpaid royalties, the album remained out of print until 2015 when the album was reissued on vinyl in remastered form by Eccentric Pop Records for its 25th anniversary. The reissue featured new cover art (taken from the Never Mind the Bassets demo) along with a bonus 7-inch EP of two outtakes from the album sessions and two live tracks from the band's first ever performance, featuring original members Crispy Jim and Dr. Frank.

Many of the band's contemporaries have also given the album praise, including Dr. Frank, saying "They recorded an amazingly great but completely unsuccessful album. It was the wrong thing at the wrong time", while Dan Panic of Screeching Weasel, in an interview for the album's 25th anniversary reissue, called it "the best East Bay pop-punk album of all time" and said it "deserves to be emblazoned in the pantheon of classic albums in our beloved and misanthropic genre of punk rock."

== Track listing ==
All tracks are written by Dallas Denery and Matt Buenrostro, except where noted.

Side one
No.	Title	Length
1.	"Baby Baby Baby Baby Baby Baby Baby (I Love You)"	1:10
2.	"Year After Year"	2:57
3.	"She's from Salinas"	2:05
4.	"There's This Girl"	1:38
5.	"Resuscitation"	2:14
6.	"Gotta Get a Girl"	1:53

Side two
No.	Title	Length
7.	"Two Tons of Dynamite"	1:41
8.	"Pathetic"	1:52
9.	"This Talk About the Girl"	2:37
10.	"Prove My Love"	1:58
11.	"Telephone Booth"	0:51
12.	"Daddy Cool" (The Rays cover; written by Frank Slay and Bob Crewe)	1:52
13.	"The Way She Gets Around"	2:13
Total length:		25:17

25th Anniversary Bonus EP
No.	Title	Length
1.	"Pretty Baby"	2:10
2.	"Loving Every Girl in the World"	2:26
3.	"I Can't Sleep" (live)	2:47
4.	"Gotta Get a Girl" (live)	2:17
Total length:		9:38

== Personnel ==
- Dallas Denery – lead vocals
- Matt Buenrostro – guitar, backing vocals
- Richie Bucher – bass
- Sergie Loobkoff – drums

Additional performers

- Crispy Jim – bass on "Gotta Get a Girl" (live version on bonus EP)
- Dr. Frank – drums on "Gotta Get a Girl" (live version on bonus EP)

Production

- Kevin Army – production, engineering, mixing
- Sweet Baby – production
- John Golden – mastering
- Dave Eck – remastering on Eccentric Pop reissue

Artwork

- Sergie Loobkoff – cover art
- Karen Filter – photography
- Liz Hale – graphic design
- Travis Woods – design on Eccentric Pop reissue
