= Turn It Around: The Story of East Bay Punk =

- Blu-Ray/DVD box cover art
- Directed by: Corbett Redford
- Written by: Corbett Redford; Anthony Marchitiello
- Produced by: Corbett Redford, Green Day
- Narrated by: Iggy Pop
- Cinematography: Greg Schneider
- Edited by: Greg Schneider
- Production companies: Jingletown; Capodezero
- Distributed by: Abramorama
- Release date: 2017
- Running time: 158 minutes
- Country: United States
- Language: English

Turn It Around: The Story of East Bay Punk is a 2017 documentary about the punk rock music scene of San Francisco and the surrounding San Francisco Bay Area from the late 1970s to the 1990s. It features interviews performances by dozens of associated artists, notably Green Day. Iggy Pop provides voice-over narration throughout the film.

== Synopsis ==
The story begins with a look at the growth of punk rock in the San Francisco area through the 1970s and '80s, ultimately settling on the scene's locus of activities, 924 Gilman Street. Much of the documentary consists of vintage performance footage by various artists of the era, while interview segments include Kathleen Hanna, Tim Armstrong, Larry Livermore, Penelope Houston, Tre Cool, Ian Mackaye, Jello Biafra, and Miranda July, among others.

== Production ==
Executive producers of the film were Pat Mangarella and the band Green Day. Corbett Redford produced the film for Jingletown and Capodezero production companies, with worldwide distribution handled by New York firm Abramorama. Redford directed the film and shared writing credit with Co-director Anthony Marchitiello. Camera work and film editing was done by Greg Schneider. The total running time is two hours and 38 minutes.

== Home media and music release ==
The film was released on Blu-ray and DVD on June 22, 2018. Simultaneously, a vinyl double-LP was issued by 1-2-3-4 Go! Records featuring 35 rare recordings from many of the bands seen in the film, including Green Day, Rancid, Crimpshrine, Isocracy, Jawbreaker and Operation Ivy. A cassette version of the soundtrack was released on July 6, 2018, packaged with a remastered reissue of Aaron Cometbus' tape compilation Lest We Forget (originally released on his BBT Tapes label in 1991). The compilation features demos, rehearsals and live recordings of many pre-Gilman Street Berkeley bands, including the pre-Operation Ivy band Basic Radio and the pre-Crimpshrine band S.A.G.

=== Track listing ===
Side A
No.	Title	Artist	Length
1.	"Another Day" (from Turn It Around!)	Crimpshrine	2:40
2.	"I Wanna Be on T.V." (from Where the Wild Things Are)	Fang	1:15
3.	"Thoughts of War" (from Sounds of Nature)	Christ on Parade	1:30
4.	"Berkeley Hardcore" (from Special Forces)	Special Forces	1:38
5.	"Be All You Can Be" (from Chet)	Corrupted Morals	2:54
6.	"United Sheep" (from Pain of Mind)	Neurosis	3:13
7.	"Wally and the Beaver Go to Nicaragua" (from Turn It Around!)	Sewer Trout	2:13
8.	"Mendocino Homeland" (from Mendocino Homeland)	The Lookouts	2:34
9.	"Hippie Man" (from Bedtime for Isocracy)	Isocracy	1:21
10.	"Control" (from Cruel and Unusual)	Soup	1:59

Side B
No.	Title	Artist	Length
11.	"Sweet Children" (Demo; previously unreleased)	Sweet Children	1:43
12.	"At Gilman Street" (from Big Black Bugs Bleed Blue Blood)	The Mr. T Experience	3:10
13.	"She's from Salinas" (from It's a Girl!)	Sweet Baby	2:08
14.	"Pacifica on Saturday" (from Kwik Way)	Kwik Way	1:42
15.	"Back to Bodie" (from Girl Band)	Kamala and the Karnivores	1:38
16.	"Equalized" (J. Robbins mix; from Demo)	Jawbreaker	3:20
17.	"Summertime" (from The Thing That Ate Floyd)	Crimpshrine	2:39
18.	"Hedgecore" (from '69 Newport)	Operation Ivy	1:36
19.	"Television" (from The Beatnigs)	The Beatnigs	5:02

Side C
No.	Title	Artist	Length
20.	"Unity" (from Energy)	Operation Ivy	2:14
21.	"The List" (from The Shit Split)	Filth	2:41
22.	"Berkeley Is My Baby (And I Wanna Kill It)" (from The Shit Split)	Blatz	2:43
23.	"Epidemic" (from Trained to Serve)	Econochrist	1:55
24.	"Sexism Impressed" (from Spitboy)	Spitboy	2:58
25.	"Yeast Power" (from Turn It Around!)	Yeastie Girlz	0:35
26.	"Dragonfly" (from Brouhaha)	Nuisance	3:30
27.	"Firecracker" (from Nickel EP)	Monsula	2:44
28.	"Losers of the Year" (from Very Small World)	Pinhead Gunpowder	2:43

Side D
No.	Title	Artist	Length
29.	"Luv Luv Luv" (from Absurd Pop Song Romance)	Pansy Division	2:34
30.	"On the Avenue" (from On the Avenue)	The Potatomen	4:28
31.	"Condition Oakland" (from 24 Hour Revenge Therapy)	Jawbreaker	5:15
32.	"I'm Telling Tim" (from So Long and Thanks for All the Shoes)	NOFX	1:17
33.	"Journey to the End of the East Bay" (from ...And Out Come the Wolves)	Rancid	3:11
34.	"Welcome to Paradise" (from Kerplunk)	Green Day	3:30
35.	"If There Ever Was a Time" (from If There Ever Was a Time)	The Armstrongs	2:39
Total length:			89:18

Lest We Forget track list
No.	Title	Artist	Length
1.	"Final Option"	Atrocity	1:40
2.	"Well Oh Well"	13	2:09
3.	"Police State"	Anti-Momb	1:42
4.	"Walk Away"	Crimpshrine	2:08
5.	"Planned Attack"	Black Guard	1:21
6.	"Cheese"	M.F.P.	1:04
7.	"Creeping Terror"	Art Faggots	2:37
8.	"America Is Dead"	Special Forces	1:30
9.	"Chip Off the Ol' Block"	The Vagrants	1:45
10.	"Meat Market"	Basic Radio	2:17
11.	"Encore"	Greedy Grady and the Sanfurds	2:30
12.	"Cavity Creeps"	Distorted Truth	1:10
13.	"House of Terror"	Violent Coercion	2:51
14.	"Cut Off"	Spent	2:43
15.	"Get Off Your High Horse"	Fang	2:11
16.	"Get Wasted"	Keg Party Hero	3:04
17.	"Hypocrites and Criticism"	Boi	2:45
18.	"Here We Are Again"	Unskilled Labor	2:50
19.	"James' Swimming Pool"	Kamala and the Karnivores	2:46
20.	"I Like Drinking Mickeys"	Intensified Bluebeard	1:03
21.	"Glue Song"	Soup	2:33
22.	"Loving Every Girl in the World"	Sweet Baby Jesus	2:26
23.	"Learning How to Smile"	Buggerall	2:01
24.	"Ready to Die"	The Deviants	2:07
25.	"There's a Place"	Basic Radio	2:27
26.	"Ski Punks"	M.F.P.	1:06
27.	"Prejudice"	Defy	1:01
28.	"I Had to Kill Some Ants Today"	S.A.G.	1:57
29.	"G.Q.U."	Soup	1:33
30.	"Dylan Was a Loser"	Roadkill	1:41
31.	"The Idiot"	Ravage	3:51
32.	"Talking All the Time"	13	1:33
33.	"Paddle or Die"	Kwik Way	1:32
34.	"Underdog"	Unskilled Labor	2:21
35.	"Process"	Atrocity	1:40
36.	"Find a New Love"	Sweet Baby Jesus	2:02
37.	"I Don't Know Why"	Crimpshrine	2:01
38.	"She's in Heat"	Hunde Scheibe	1:56
39.	"Presence at My Back"	Trial	1:28
40.	"Christ Is No Matter"	Youth Authority	1:43
41.	"Martial Law"	Anti-Momb	2:59
42.	"Goat"	Albany Dread	2:18
43.	"Teenage Fuckup"	Ratt Patrol	1:04
44.	"Toxic Dog"	Public Enema	2:12
45.	"Off the Hook"	Intensified Bluebeard	3:38

== See also ==
- Turn It Around!
