= Lame Gig Contest =

- The cover of the second pressing

Studio album by Crimpshrine
- Released: January 1989
- Recorded: April 1988
- Studio: Dancing Dog Studios in Emeryville, California
- Genre: Punk rock
- Length: 33:47
- Label: Musical Tragedies (MT 073)
- Producer: Kevin Army

Crimpshrine chronology
| Sleep, What's That? (1988) | Lame Gig Contest (1989) | Quit Talkin' Claude... (1989) |

Lame Gig Contest is the only full-length studio album by the Berkeley, California-based punk rock band Crimpshrine. After previously being rejected by the band's label Lookout Records, it was finally released in January 1989 in Germany on Musical Tragedies. The first 1,000 copies of the album featured a yellow cover, while a later pressing of 500 was released with blue. Although the majority of the songs were recorded specifically for the album, Lame Gig Contest also contained tracks from previous sessions. The songs "Rearranged" and "Another Day" were originally featured on the Maximumrocknroll compilation Turn It Around! in 1987, while "Concrete Lawns", "MSFMB" and "2nd Generation Junkies" were unreleased recordings from the sessions of their Sleep, What's That? EP.

Having stayed out of print after its second pressing, the album was widely bootlegged by fans for several years. In 1992, a number of the tracks were featured on the posthumous Lookout compilation album Duct-Tape Soup, while most of the others were released on The Sound of a New World Being Born in 1998. The only songs from the album not to see release in the United States were "New Scenery" and "Concrete Lawns".

== Background and recording ==
Shortly after the release of Crimpshrine's debut EP Sleep, What's That?, the group recruited friend Idon Bryant as their rhythm guitarist. Although the group was not searching for a second guitarist, Bryant had been previously considered the "unofficial fourth member" for some time and was hired because he "fit in really well" and added a "heavier sound" to the band, freeing vocalist/guitarist Jeff Ott to concentrate more on singing. The band decided to record its debut full-length in April, and set out to Dancing Dog Studios in Emeryville, California with Kevin Army. However, when the band attempted to release the album, it was rejected by Lookout Records so they scrapped the recordings and decided to release it on a cassette tape later. Despite this, one song from the session, "Summertime", was featured on the Lookout compilation The Thing That Ate Floyd later that year. Crimpshrine later embarked on its only United States tour in July and, due to tensions, Bryant and bassist Pete Rypins left the band abruptly after a show in Texas. Ott and Elliot then hired Paul Curran as their new bassist, and he and his brother drove out to finish the tour. After the tour ended, the band received a call from Florian Schück, owner of German label Musical Tragedies, wanting permission to release a Crimpshrine album. The group decided to give Schück the rejected Lookout recordings, along with other previously unreleased songs, and Lame Gig Contest was released on Musical Tragedies in January 1989.

== Lyrical themes and song origins ==
"Safely Wasting Away", track 2, was written by Elliot about how he felt isolated from the world due to his nocturnality. According to Elliot, he slept during the day because "when the sun is out I can see all the ugliness in the world, but the night is quiet and calm and peaceful, and the ugliness is shadowed." He further stated that when he wrote the song, he realized that his sleeping pattern had "taken its toll on me, I felt so far removed from the rest of the human race that I could hardly imagine what happened during the daytime." However, he said that he "still sleep[s] during the day, but I've learned that too much alienation can be damaging to your mental health, so I try to be careful."

The title of track 5, "R.D.C.", came from an abandoned building on the Richmond Waterfront in Richmond, California that Elliot and a friend found. The building said "Richmond Distributing Company", but the two called it "Rancid Death Café" as a joke and began hanging out there. A few months later, the building was demolished and Elliot was inspired to name the song "Rancid Death Café." According to Elliot, the song is about a number of things. He stated that the song is partially about "friendship in a time of desperation" and "the need to have a place to call your own" but also said that the beginning is about "love, frustration and dealing with the pain of rejection." "I don't know what all that is doing in one song, but it seemed to tie in together at the time," he said.

== Track listing ==
All music is composed by Crimpshrine.

Side one
| No. | Title | Lyrics | Length |
|---|---|---|---|
| 1. | "Left Outside Again" | Aaron Elliot | 2:07 |
| 2. | "Safely Wasting Away" | Elliot | 2:18 |
| 3. | "Along the Way" | Jeff Ott | 2:06 |
| 4. | "WNWSFK (Wimpy New Wave Song for Katja)" | Instrumental | 1:26 |
| 5. | "Can You Feel That?" | Ott | 2:01 |
| 6. | "R.D.C. (Rancid Death Café)" | Elliot | 2:15 |
| 7. | "The Tour" | Elliot | 2:05 |
| 8. | "My Friend" | Elliot, Ott | 2:59 |

Side two
| No. | Title | Lyrics | Length |
|---|---|---|---|
| 9. | "Wake Up" | Ott | 2:33 |
| 10. | "New Scenery" | Elliot | 1:56 |
| 11. | "Concrete Lawns" | Elliot | 2:13 |
| 12. | "MSFMB (Mosh Song for Murray Bowles)" | Ott | 2:29 |
| 13. | "2nd Generation Junkies" | Ott | 2:27 |
| 14. | "Rearranged" | Elliot | 1:59 |
| 15. | "Another Day" | Elliot | 2:48 |
| Total length: | | | 33:47 |

== Personnel ==
- Jeff Ott – lead vocals, guitar
- Pete Rypins – bass, backing vocals
- Aaron Elliot – drums
- Idon Bryant – rhythm guitar on tracks 1–11

Production

- Aaron Elliot – cover art, layout
- Murray Bowles; Idon Bryant; Todd; Jennifer – photography
- Richie Bucher – graphic design
