= Cuddle (EP) =

EP by Stikky
- Released: August 1988; October 1988
- Recorded: May 29, 1988 at Art of Ears Studios in San Francisco
- Genre: Hardcore punk, punk rock
- Length: 14:09
- Language: English
- Label: Off the Disk, Slap a Ham
- Producer: Andy Ernst

Stikky chronology
Turn It Around! (1987)	Cuddle (1988)	The Thing That Ate Floyd (1988)

Cuddle is an extended play by the American punk rock band Stikky. It was released on 7-inch vinyl in Switzerland only in August 1988 through Off the Disk Records.

The extended play was recorded, mixed, and engineered in 4 hours at Art of Ears Studios in San Francisco, California on May 29, 1988. Due to many fans in the United States requesting copies of Cuddle, the group re-released it through bassist Chris Dodge's label Slap a Ham Records in October 1988.

== Track listing ==
All tracks are written by Todd Wilder, Chris Wilder and Chris Dodge.

Side one
No.	Title	Length
1.	"Boy, Do Girls Ever Suck!"	1:47
2.	"The Fashion Risk"	1:43
3.	"Spider-Man" (written by Bob Harris and Paul Francis Webster)	0:56
4.	"Transients"	1:46
5.	"One Good Idea After Another"	1:06

Side two
No.	Title	Length
6.	"Intercourse with the System"	2:56
7.	"Team Gilligan"	1:49
8.	"Cowtipping (Part 3)"	0:56
9.	"On Top O' Da World" (written by Richard Carpenter and John Bettis; originally performed by The Carpenters)	1:11
Total length:		14:09

== Personnel ==
- Todd Wilder - drums, lead vocals
- Chris Wilder - guitar, vocals
- Chris Dodge - bass, vocals

Production

- Andy Ernst - producer
- Kevin Army - engineer, mixing
- John Golden - mastering
- Murray Bowles - photography
