= Tribal War Records =

- Founded: 1991
- Founder: Neil Robinson
- Genre: Punk rock • hardcore punk
- Country of origin: United States
- Location: New York City

Tribal War Records was a punk rock record label formed in 1991 in New York City by ex-Nausea singer, Neil Robinson. The label operated out of Brooklyn, New York until relocating to Portland, Oregon in 1997. The label released recordings by the notable punk bands such as the anarchist band Aus-Rotten, The Casualties, DIRT, and Oi Polloi among others. In addition to the label's own roster, the label also worked as a touring distro, distributing works by other punk bands, labels, and presses, such as Ak Press and Profane Existence.

== Roster ==
- 2000 Ds
- Anti-Product
- Age
- Aus-Rotten
- Avail
- Axiom
- Behind Enemy Lines
- The Casualties
- Coltus
- Confrontation
- Contravene
- Cress
- DIRT
- Dom Dar
- Final Massacre
- Final Warning
- Godless
- Harum-Scarum
- Hellkrusher
- Hellsister
- The Hysterics
- In Anger
- Kochise
- The Krays
- Mankind?
- Monument To Ruins
- Murdered Minority
- Oi Polloi
- Power of Idea
- Recharge
- Resist and Exist
- Riot/Clone
- Sarcasm
- Social Outkast
- Stracony
- TDF
- Thought Crime
- Union
- Wardance Orange
- Warning
