= Michelle Cruz Gonzales =

American drummer

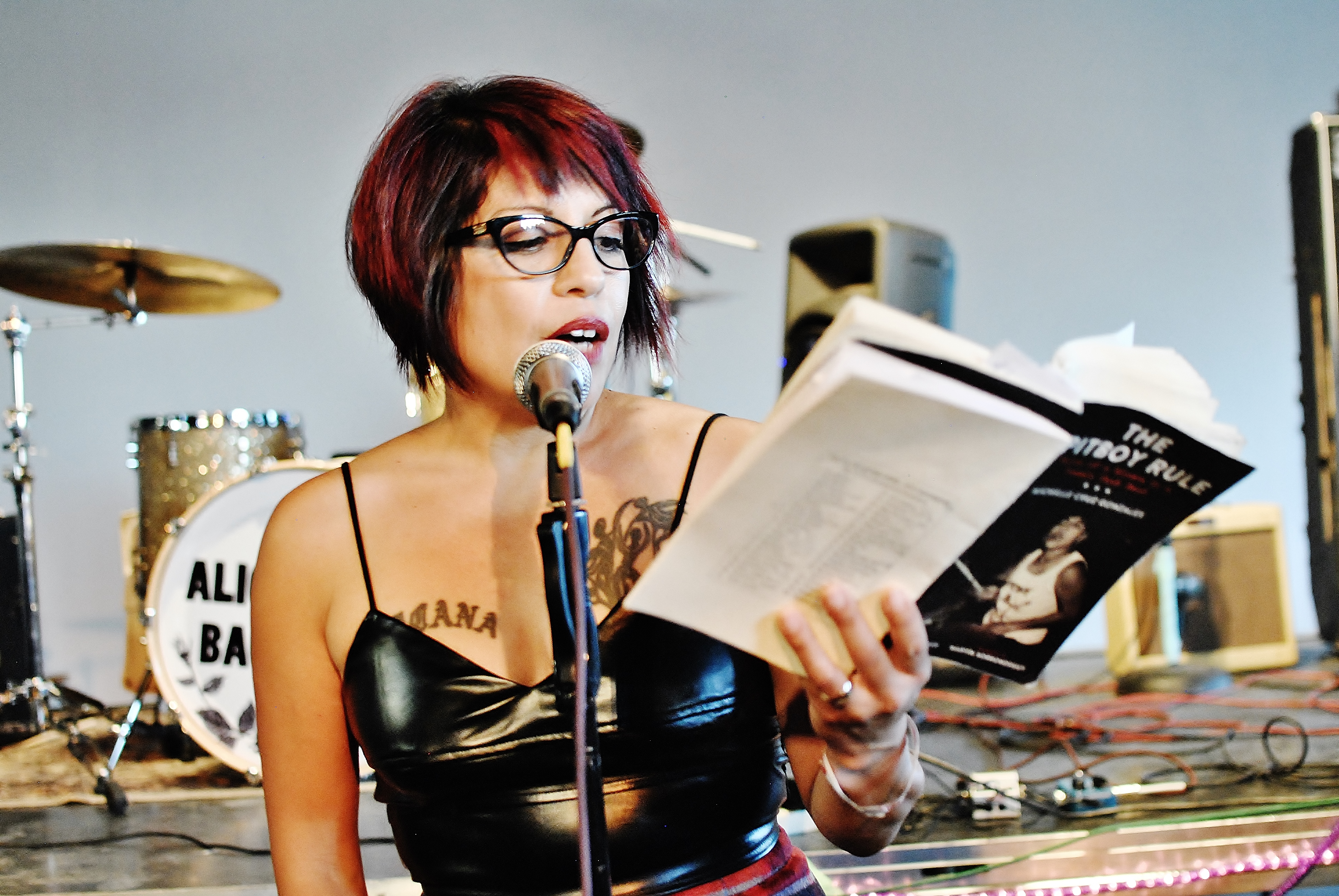
Michelle Cruz Gonzales reading The Spitboy Rule

Michelle Cruz Gonzales (born October 29, 1969, in Los Angeles, California) is a musician, author, and college English instructor. She is a founding member and drummer of the groundbreaking all-female hardcore punk band Spitboy. Gonzales is featured in the Green Day-produced documentary Turn It Around: The Story of East Bay Punk (2017), directed by Corbett Redford.

== Career ==
Before Spitboy, Gonzales played drums in Bitch Fight and guitar and tambourine in the female pop punk band Kamala and the Karnivores. The latter band reformed in 2016 to play the Lookouting, a celebration of Lookout Record bands on January 1, 2017.

Gonzales, known as "Todd" in Spitboy, wrote lyrics for many of the band's songs, including "In Your Face", "Ultimate Violations", and "What Are Little Girls Made Of?"

After Spitboy, Gonzales appeared in anthologies such as Listen To Your Mother and Book Lovers and has contributed to Hip Mama Magazine. In 2016, Gonzales published The Spitboy Rule: Tales of a Xicana in a Female Punk Band.

== The Spitboy Rule ==
The Spitboy Rule: Tales of a Xicana in a Female Punk Band is a non-linear collection of personal essays about coming of age in Spitboy, learning to navigate artistic partnerships, touring the world as the only person of color in the band. Within her memoir, Michelle describes her experience of push back within the punk music scene as a woman of color who considered herself a hardcore punk rocker.

"Michelle Gonzales's punk rock account is inspiring on many levels. For outsider artists, women musicians, or anybody who has ever felt the desire to forge an identity in uncharted territory, this book is detailed, heartfelt, and historically important. Briskly told in clean, conversational prose, The Spitboy Rule is an entertaining read and functions as an important historical, critical, and sociopolitical document of pre-internet DIY music."
—Jesse Michaels, vocalist for Operation Ivy and author of Whispering Bodies.

Bitch Magazine reviewer Sarah Century wrote, "Stories of epic road trips, high-intensity punk shows, and dealing with sexist fans are told with phenomenal good humor and the wisdom of hindsight inserted wryly into the narrative. While Gonzales's life and history are singular, her story is infinitely relatable to those of us that have felt outside of our own culture, or subculture."

== Discography ==
=== Bitch Fight ===
- "On and On"—on a various artists compilation album The Thing That Ate Floyd (Lookout Records) - 1988

=== Spitboy ===
- The Threat Sexism Impressed b/w Ultimate Violations 7" (Lookout Records 51) - 1991
- True Self Revealed LP (Ebullition Records) - 1993
- Mi Cuerpo Es Mio 7" (Allied Recordings) - 1994
- The Spitboy CD (Allied Recordings) - 1995 - contains the three singles and the LP
- Rasana 7" - (Ebullition Records) - 1995
- Split LP with Los Crudos (Ebullition Records) – 1995

=== Instant Girl ===
- Post-Coital LP (Allied Recordings) - 1996

=== Kamala and The Karnivores ===
- Girl Band (Lookout Records 16) - 1989
- Vanity Project (Song Preserve) - 2018

== Education ==
In 2001 and 2003, Gonzales earned degrees in English and Creative Writing from Mills College, where she also minored in ethnic studies. She has published in anthologies, literary journals, and Hip Mama Magazine. She teaches English and creative writing at Las Positas College.

While a student at Mills College, she had her only child, Luis Manuel Gonzales Peralta. Gonzales teaches English and creative writing at Las Positas College and has been married to J. Ines Peralta Hernandez since 1998.
