= Bedtime for Isocracy =

Bedtime for Isoscracy

EP by Isocracy
- Released: January 1988
- Recorded: November 1987
- Studio: Dangerous Rhythm (Oakland, California)
- Genre: Punk rock, hardcore punk
- Length: 10:01
- Language: English
- Label: Lookout!
- Producer: Kevin Army

Isocracy chronology
Turn It Around! (1987)	Bedtime for Isoscracy (1988)	The Thing That Ate Floyd (1988)

Bedtime for Isocracy is the only studio E.P. by the American punk rock band Isocracy. It was released on 7-inch vinyl in January 1988 through Lookout! Records with the catalog number LK 005. The title is a parody of the Dead Kennedys' final studio album Bedtime for Democracy (1986), a popular album among punk rock fans at the time. The cover art depicted the members of Isocracy in a bed, accompanied by Jello Biafra.

The track list on the sleeve (along with most online discographies of Isocracy) states that a cover of the Lynyrd Skynyrd song "Freebird" in its full form is the eleventh track. However, no such track is present on the extended play. What makes such a track even more unlikely is the limited recording time 7-inch provides, which in most cases is no more than ten minutes. With the recording time of the other tracks, there would barely be enough room for another twelve-second song, much less a seven-minute one.

== Track listing ==
All tracks are written by Jason Beebout.

Side one
No.	Title	Length
1.	"Zimbabwean Hell Rock (Slight Return)"	0:23
2.	"Rodeo"	1:52
3.	"Hippie Man"	1:21
4.	"Two Blocks Away"	1:34

Side two
No.	Title	Length
5.	"Eight"	1:52
6.	"Amilyplympt Three"	1:17
7.	"Funky Brakewire"	1:03
8.	"Ten Seconds of Anarchy"	0:12
9.	"Swisher Sweets"	0:12
10.	"Sgalf Etaredefnoc"	0:07
Total length:		10:01

== Personnel ==
- Jason Beebout - lead vocals
- Lenny Johnson - guitar, backing vocals
- Martin Brome - bass, backing vocals
- Al Sobrante - drums

Production

- Kevin Army - producer, engineer, mixing, recording

== Trivia ==
- The final track on the album, Sgalf Etaredefnoc, is a track that seems to be reversed. When the track is reversed again, it reveals that it is a segment of another Isocracy song, called Confederate Flags. Additionally, the name of the song is Confederate Flags spelled backwards.
