= It's a Girl =

It's a Girl may refer to:

- A phrase based on sex assignment
- It's a Girl! (album), the only album by Sweet Baby
- "It's a Girl", a 2002 two-part episode of The Hughleys
- It's a Girl: The Three Deadliest Words in the World, a documentary film

== See also ==
- It's a Boy (disambiguation)
