= Squirtgun (album) =

Studio album by Squirtgun
- Released: October 9, 1995
- Recorded: 1995
- Genre: Punk rock, pop punk
- Length: 25:41
- Label: Lookout!
- Producer: Mass Giorgini

Squirtgun chronology
Squirtgun (1995)	Another Sunny Afternoon (1997)

Professional ratings
Review scores
Source	Rating
AllMusic	4/5 stars

Squirtgun is the eponymously titled debut studio album by the American punk rock band Squirtgun. It was released on October 9, 1995, through Lookout! Records. The song "Social" was used during the opening credits of the Kevin Smith film Mallrats (1995). "Make It Up" features a guest appearance by Mike Dirnt of Green Day on bass and backing vocals.

== Track listing ==
1. "Long So Long" (Mass Giorgini, Matt Hart) - 2:00
2. "Elaine on the Brain" (Flav Giorgini, Hart) - 1:50
3. "Allergic to You" (M. Giorgini, Hart) - 2:15
4. "Mr. Orange" (F. Giorgini, Hart) - 2:03
5. "Liar's Corner" (Hart) - 1:37
6. "Social" (Hart) - 3:52
7. "With a Grin and a Kick" (Hart) - 2:31
8. "Morning Grit" (F. Giorgini) - 1:14
9. "Less Than Nothing" (F. Giorgini) - 2:30
10. "Make It Up" (F. Giorgini) - 2:02
11. "Headache All Day" (M. Giorgini, Hart) - 2:06
12. "Frederick's Frost" (M. Giorgini, Hart) - 1:40

== Personnel ==
- Mass Giorgini - bass, producer
- Flav Giorgini - guitar
- Matt Hart - guitar, vocals
- Dan Lumley - drums
- Mike Dirnt - backing vocals on track 10
