= Sleep, What's That? =

- The front cover image is a variation of the logo for Biff's Corporation, a restaurant in Oakland, California

EP by Crimpshrine
- Released: January 30, 1988
- Recorded: September 1987
- Studio: Dangerous Rhythm (Oakland, California)
- Genre: Punk rock
- Length: 10:25
- Label: Lookout (LK 004)
- Producer: Kevin Army

Crimpshrine chronology
Sleep, What's That? (1988)	Lame Gig Contest (1989)

Sleep, What's That? is the debut EP by the Berkeley, California-based punk rock band Crimpshrine. It was released on January 30, 1988, through Lookout Records on 7-inch vinyl with the catalog number LK 004. After the EP went out of print in 1992, all of the tracks were added to the compilation album The Sound of a New World Being Born in 1998, which is also currently not in print. It is often considered a classic Lookout Records release and as Crimpshrine's strongest recording.

== Background and recording ==
The group originally formed in 1982 under the name S.A.G. and featured future Operation Ivy frontman Jesse Michaels as the vocalist, Aaron Elliot on guitar and Jeff Ott playing drums. According to Elliot, there was a "serious lack of equipment" as they only had one drum and 3 strings on the guitar. Once Michaels left the band in 1984, they changed their name to Crimpshrine and went through several different line-ups, which had Ott playing synthesizer and piano at various points. Pete Rypins finally joined in 1986 as the group's permanent bassist and, after recording their first demo in early 1987, were approached by David Hayes to record tracks for the upcoming Maximumrocknroll compilation Turn It Around! in August. Shortly after recording the tracks for the compilation, the group went to Dangerous Rhythm in Oakland, California to record tracks for what would become the Sleep, What's That? EP with producer and engineer Kevin Army.

== Lyrical themes and song origins ==
"In My Mind" was written by Ott about subconscious racism, with him stating that people "must all strive to recognize and remove these small but very ingrained pieces of intolerance from ourselves" in the liner notes. The inspiration for the song came when Ott was on a bus and came across an African-American man lying in the aisle unresponsive after he repeatedly attempted to talk to him. Finding that the man had no pulse, Ott asked the driver call an ambulance, to which he reportedly replied "Oh, he's just some black wino who's passed out." After Ott told him to call an ambulance again, he finally did and one showed up soon enough to save the man.

The title track was written when, in the spring of 1987, a group of homeless people in Berkeley, California set up the "Homeless Liberation Front", an organization that made a "city of tents" in Provo Park which they called Reaganville. Ott liked the idea and decided to help them out by bringing food and watching over the tent while they slept, as they were constantly harassed by police officers and other city officials. After a few weeks, Reaganville was torn down by the police. Ott also drew inspiration for the song from his own experiences with homelessness.

"Tomorrow", the EP's final track, is a song about sarcastic hope and originally began as an instrumental from the group's formative years. According to Elliot, it was the only song written during that period that the band kept.

== Release and pressings ==
The layout and packaging of the EP was managed by David Hayes and released on January 30, 1988, on Lookout Records with the catalog number LK 004. 2,000 copies were originally pressed on 7-inch vinyl and were number-stamped in red ink on the back and included a booklet with lyrics and other information. By mistake of the pressing plant, about 50 of these copies were pressed on blue marble vinyl. The third pressing was done in unknown quantities; they were not numbered on the back and the booklet was light blue instead of the original pink. On a later pressing done in 1991, the back cover listed Lookout Records' then-new address in Berkeley, as opposed to the original Laytonville, California address. The booklet was also white and the updates section from the original was replaced with a picture of the band (this version was referred to as the "8th pressing").

== Track listing ==
All music is composed by Crimpshrine.

Side one
No.	Title	Lyrics	Length
1.	"Bricks" (Includes part of "Take On Me" by A-ha)	Jeff Ott	2:20
2.	"In My Mind"	Ott	3:15

Side two
No.	Title	Lyrics	Length
3.	"Sleep, What's That?"	Ott	2:15
4.	"Tomorrow" (Includes part of "Tomorrow" from the musical Annie in the opening)	Aaron Elliot	2:35
Total length:			10:25

== Personnel ==
- Jeff Ott – lead vocals, guitar
- Pete Rypins – bass, backing vocals
- Aaron Elliot – drums

Additional performers

- Jake Sayles; Dave Henwood – backing vocals on "Tomorrow"

Production

- Kevin Army – producer, engineer
- Murray Bowles; Idon Bryant; Rhoda; Brian Edge - photography
- Anna R. – booklet artwork
