= Aus-Rotten =

American crust punk band

- Origin: Pittsburgh, Pennsylvania, U.S.
- Genres: Hardcore punk, crust punk, anarcho-punk
- Years active: 1992–2001, 2019
- Labels: Havoc Records, Rotten Propaganda, Tribal War Records, Skuld
- Past members: Dave Trenga (vocals); Eric Good (guitar, vocals); Matt Garabedian (drums); Corey Lyons (bass); Adrienne Droogas (vocals, 1999-2001)

Aus-Rotten was an American crust punk band formed in Pittsburgh, Pennsylvania. Active from 1991 to 2001, its members practiced and promoted a philosophy of anarchist politics. The band included lead vocalist Dave Trenga, vocalist/guitarist Eric Good, bassist Corey Lyons, and drummer Matt Garabedian. Spitboy singer Adrienne Droogas would often join the band in their later material. The band's name comes from the German verb ausrotten, which translates to "exterminate" or "eradicate".

== Music ==
=== Musical style ===
According to their Myspace site, Aus-Rotten is influenced by Black Flag, Conflict, Crass, and Subhumans. The band has covered songs by Chumbawamba, Flux of Pink Indians, The Pist, Conflict, Crucifix and Upright Citizens.

Aus-Rotten went through roughly two stylistic periods during its existence; they originated as a bass-heavy hardcore punk band with low-fidelity production, before taking a hiatus and returning with a thicker sound and a second vocalist (Adrienne Droogas, formerly of Spitboy).

=== Lyrical themes ===
Dave Trenga penned most of the band's lyrics. Most of their songs espoused an anarchist worldview, touching upon consumerism, LGBT rights, the Christian right, direct action, feminism, AIDS, immigration, and animal rights.

The band is perhaps most famous for its radical, quotable lyrics (e.g. "People are not expendable, government is", "As long as flags fly above us, no one's really free"), as well as for their strong anti-fascist stance which, according to the interview on the ABC No Rio documentary, got them threatened at least once.

== Post-breakup ==
Aus-Rotten went on a hiatus in the mid-'90s and during that time Dave formed Human Investment with Andy of Anti-Flag and Corey and Eric formed Doomsday Parade. Aus-Rotten broke up for good in early 2001 and members have gone on to form Caustic Christ and Behind Enemy Lines.

Pittsburgh City Paper has described Aus-Rotten as "arguably the most important band of the '90s anarcho-punk renaissance." The band's 1994 Fuck Nazi Sympathy 7" sold 25,000 copies, making it Havoc Records' best-selling release. Fuck Nazi Sympathy topped a list of bestselling D.I.Y. Punk record label releases compiled in 2008, outselling anything released on Ebullition, Three One G, Profane Existence, Gravity Records, Lengua Armada, and various other labels. They toured Japan briefly in 1998.

On August 18, 2019 Aus-Rotten performed a few songs at Skull Fest 11 in Pittsburgh.

== Discography ==
=== Demos ===
- "We Are Denied, They Deny It" (1992)

=== EPs ===
- "Anti-Imperialist" (1993)
- "Fuck Nazi Sympathy" (1994)

=== Studio albums ===
- The System Works For Them (1996)
- ...And Now Back to Our Programming (1998)
- The Rotten Agenda (2001)

=== Compilation ===
- "Not One Single Fucking Hit Discography" (1997)

=== Splits ===
- "Aus-Rotten / Naked Aggression" (1994)

=== Appears on ===
- "Iron City Punk Compilation" (1993)
- "Pogo Attack Compilation" (1994)
- "Barricades and Broken Dreams: An International Tribute to Conflict" (1995)
- "Start A Riot" Compilation (1996)
- "Solidarity Compilation - Benefit For ABC No Rio" (1999)
- "Return of The Read Menace - Benefit for AK Press" (1999)

== Members ==
=== Final lineup ===
- Corey Lyons - Bass
- Dave Trenga - Vocals
- Eric Good - Guitar, Vocals
- Matt Garabedian - Drums
- Adrienne Droogas (ex-Spitboy) - Vocals

=== Former members ===
- Ajax - Guitar
- Richie Carramadre - Drums
- Douglas Weaver - Drums
- Tim Williams - Drums
- Dan Monaco - Drums
