= It's a Boy =

It's a Boy may refer to:

- A phrase based on sex assignment
- It's a Boy!, a 1930 British stage show co-produced by and starring Leslie Henson
- It's a Boy (film), a 1933 British film starring Leslie Henson and directed by Tim Whelan
- "It's a Boy" (song), by Slick Rick, 1991
- "It's a Boy", a song by the Who from Tommy, 1969
- It's a Boy, an upcoming mixtape or album by J. Cole. It is said to be his "2nd/3rd to last" project.
- "It's a Boy!" (Roseanne), a 1993 television episode

== See also ==
- It's a Girl (disambiguation)
