= Troubled Hubble =

American indie rock band

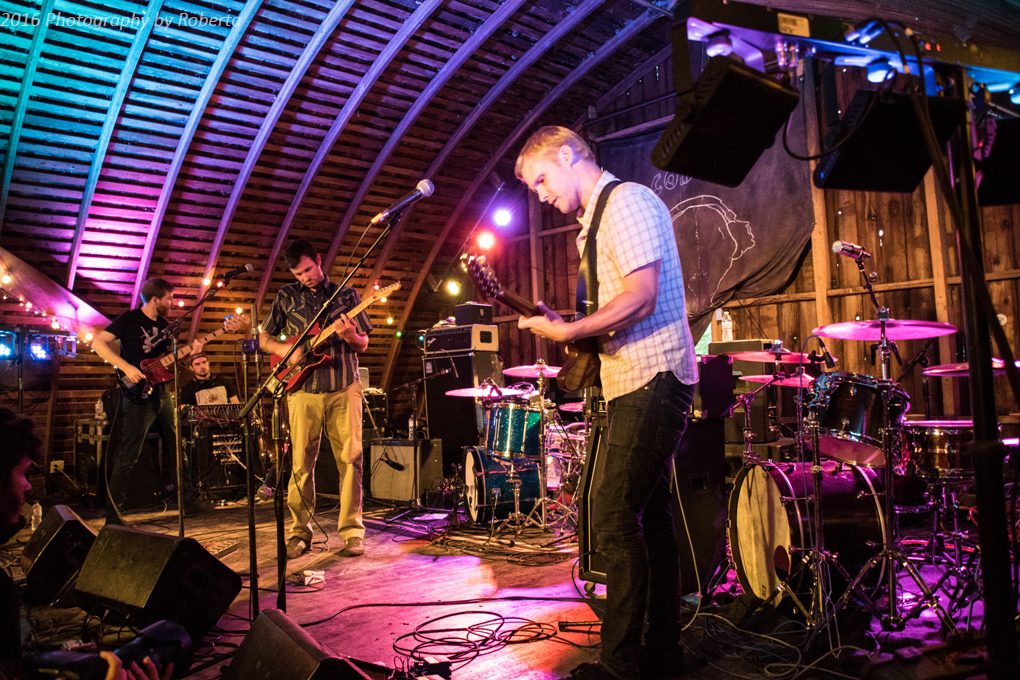

Background information
- Origin: Chicago, Illinois, U.S.
- Genre: Indie rock
- Years active: 1998–2005, 2015–present
- Label: Lookout! Records
- Past members: Chris Otepka; Andrew Lanthrum; Nathan Lanthrum; Josh Miller

Troubled Hubble is an indie rock band from Chicago, Illinois.

The song "I Love My Canoe", from Penturbia, received airplay on college radio in 2003.

== History ==
In the 6 years they were a band, Troubled Hubble played over 400 shows, criss-crossing the United States of America. The band played shows in every state except Alaska and Hawaii, and toured Canada twice, earning a substantial following of college kids and mainstream music fans. In June 2004, Troubled Hubble traveled to Washington D.C. to record what would be their last album. The album was recorded at Inner Ear Studios and produced by former Dismemberment Plan guitarist Jason Caddell. Following the release of Making Beds in a Burning House in 2005, the band received significant media coverage, was named Band of the Day by SPIN, and spent several months touring the United States with Maxïmo Park. Just after playing in a CMJ showcase, the band decided to break up citing "reasons both personal and health related." Troubled Hubble played its last show at Schuba's in Chicago on September 29, 2005.

On June 30, 2015, Troubled Hubble announced their reunion after a "brief 10-year hiatus."

=== Side Projects ===
Chris Otepka remained active with his project "The Heligoats".

Nate Lantham and Andrew Lantham formed "Kid, You’ll Move Mountains" in 2006 till present.

== Discography ==
- Slow Plant Entrance EP (Magic Spot Records, 2000)
- The Sun Beamed Off the Name Maurice (Magic Spot, 2001)
- Broken Airplanes (Magic Spot, 2001)
- Penturbia (Latest Flame Records, 2003)
- Yes, Have Some (Yes, Have Some) (Latest Flame Records, 2004)
- A Happy Day Went Off the Cliff EP (Latest Flame Records, 2005)
- Making Beds in a Burning House (Lookout! Records, 2005)
- Sir Chenjuns EP (Lookout, 2005)
