= The Thing That Ate Floyd =

Compilation album by Various artists
- Released: November 1988
- Recorded: 1987–1988
- Genre: Punk rock, hardcore punk, ska punk
- Length: 81:54
- Label: Lookout!
- Producer: Alex Sergay, Kevin Army

The Thing That Ate Floyd is a compilation album released in November 1988 by Lookout! Records as a double LP, and in 2002 as a double CD. The album is a compilation of bands from the 924 Gilman St. punk rock scene. It includes bands such as Operation Ivy, No Use for a Name, Crimpshrine and The Mr. T Experience.

== Track listing ==
=== Disc 1 ===
1. Skin Flutes - "Straight Edge Song" - 3:23
2. East Bay Mud - "Win or Lose" - 2:14
3. Corrupted Morals - "Big Man" - 1:15
4. Neighborhood Watch - "Gloria" - 2:20
5. Tommy Rot - "Not One of Mine" - 2:13
6. Cringer - "Cottleston Pie" - 1:06
7. Boo! Hiss! Pfftlb! - "Banana Smell Funny Sonata in G" - 2:30
8. Eyeball - "The Incredibly Blue Moustache of Mr Tinselteeth" - 3:36
9. Isocracy - "Happy Now" - 1:46
10. Kamala & The Karnivores - "29 Degrees" - 2:29
11. Bitch Fight - "On and On" - 1:36
12. Plaid Retina - "Tied/Tried" - 1:07
13. Neurosis - "Common Inconsistencies" - 4:01
14. Complete Disorder - "We Must Do Something Now" - 2:27
15. Well Hung Monks - "Product of Misdirection" - 3:14
16. Swollen Boss Toad - "Broken Strings" - 2:28
17. Vomit Launch - "Life Sucks" - 2:58

=== Disc 2 ===
1. Relief Society - "Abandoned Beer Messiah" - 2:38
2. The Mr. T Experience - "Boredom Zone" - 2:57
3. Sewer Trout - "Vagina Envy" - 2:32
4. The Vagrants - "No Way Back" - 2:01
5. Sweet Baby - "Andorra" - 1:39
6. Stikky - "Don't Lick My Leg" - 0:19
7. No Use for a Name - "What!?!" - 2:37
8. Surrogate Brains - "Extreme Racial Pride" - 2:43
9. The Lookouts - "Outside" - 3:04
10. Capitol Punishment - "Jackknifed Rig" - 2:41
11. Crimpshrine - "Summertime" - 2:40
12. Spent - "In My Past" - 3:05
13. Raskul - "Change" - 2:17
14. Tribe Of Resistance - "Controversy" - 1:41
15. Nuisance - "Day of Sun" - 2:53
16. Operation Ivy - "Hangin' Out" - 1:21
17. Steel Pole Bath Tub - "Bee Sting" - 4:03

== See also ==
- List of punk compilation albums
