= Plaid Retina =

- Genres: Punk rock, hardcore punk
- Years active: 1986–1995
- Labels: Lookout! Records; Very Small Records

Plaid Retina was an American punk rock band from Visalia, California, formed in 1986 and active until 1996.

== History ==
=== The beginning ===
The history of Plaid Retina begins in 1984, in Visalia, a small city in California Central Valley, when drummer Don Hudgens joined metal band Oblivion, a high school band established by Travis, Jeff Gilley, "Bryan T" Thompson, Alarick Garcia and Mike Matthews. The crew for that band also included Matt Morris and Jeff Beck. It was at this time Hudgens and Matt Morris met up with Kelly Casper, who was part of that scene at Redwood High School.

Even though the band was not from Los Angeles, the band managed to keep up with the underground scene in Los Angeles (150 miles from Visalia), which was what made them unique in their small-town local scene. Heavy Metal's definition, however, was about to be shattered by a plethora of different influences. The advent of hardcore punk acts such as Minor Threat and the Suicidal Tendencies, whose first album made a huge impression of the metal scene, caused the members of the band to splinter.

=== Misc. ===
In 1985, after the breakup of Oblivion, Hudgens and Morris decided that if they joined forces, they might be able to accomplish their own band, so they gave it a shot and set up shop in an old railroad boxcar that Morris' parents, Bill & Brenda, were using as a shed, located in a huge backyard away from the neighborhoods. They convinced Kelly Casper to join in on bass with Matt playing guitar and singing. This incarnation was called "Misc.", which happened to be scribbled on the first cassette tape they recorded on. The music clearly was leaving metal behind and headed full speed toward hardcore punk and skate rock. The music was played and performed as brash and as abrasively as they could possibly deliver it, and recorded with a 'ghetto-blaster' onto very old used cassette tapes that were actually found in the boxcar, with vocals by both Morris and Casper sung directly into the built-in microphone. Gary Stallions also played second guitar for an appearance at a Redwood High School talent show. They were kicked out of the talent show when panic ensued because no one other than the punk scene knew what was going on when the fast music and slam dancing erupted.

=== Aggravated Assault ===
Casper had to leave the band amicably, so Don Hudgens brought in Rob Anderson, who grew up with him during their teens and knew Matt Morris from the local BMX scene on that side of town years earlier around 1982. They changed the name to Aggravated Assault, the band then started to gravitate toward Fresno, California, a city 40 minutes north which had an active punk scene, shops and interesting places to skate, especially in its classic downtown area. Hudgens and Morris posted a flyer at "The Record Factory" which led to their first real gig at the legendary Knights of Columbus Hall, opening for the Wimpy Dicks (San Luis Obispo) and the Sea Hags. Repeated trips to Fresno led them to meet Dale Stewart of Capitol Punishment at his record store in Fresno, Stage Dive Records, which although not in Visalia, became one of the bands favorite hang outs whenever they could get a chance to be there.

== Releases ==
=== Plaid Retina ===
Stewart convinced the band to change its name to Plaid Retina (the name itself was a group decision), mostly to help them grow just in case they grew out of the piston-pumping D.R.I. style rhythms, which proved to be sound advice. Stewart connected them with the studio A.I.R. (Audio Image Recording) in Fresno at Van Ness and Bremer owned by Gray Gregson. This was the team that recorded the self-titled debut album, Plaid Retina, that when pressed was actually a little 7-inch but was in fact a formidable full-length album (relatively speaking). Plaid Retina was a furious debut with a devastating rhythmic pace comparable to Minor Threat and D.R.I. Stewart also introduced the band to the staff of the Maximum RocknRoll magazine where David Hayes entered the picture.

Hudgens used the magazine as a resource to communicate with people all over the world via mail. External influences other than hardcore punk began to appear and the band started experiencing with these influences. David Hayes then released Plaid Retina on Lookout! Records, the Berkeley based label he formed with Larry Livermore. Since the album was already recorded, releasing it was done fast and efficiently.

The East Bay and San Francisco Bay Area then become an additional focal point for the band. Morris got a van for the band, so national touring outside of California could begin.

=== Boxcar ===
At some point, Rob Anderson quit to become a Marine, and Travis from the "Oblivion" days joined on bass. Boxcar was recorded again with Gray Gregson at A.I.R. and was a cassette tape demo that consisted of covers on side A, and originals on side B. A sort of introduction of Travis to the world.

Thru the mail, Hudgens crossed paths with Musical Tragedies, a record label in Germany that later released Boxcar as a 7-inch EP. Once again, since the material was already recorded, this project was able to be pressed and released very efficiently.

The originals on side B had a noticeable tempo relax from the first Plaid Retina release. However, the external influences other than hardcore have yet to show themselves - that will happen with the next release, Pinkeye. The band spent a lot of personal time exploring these influences and getting them ready before presenting a radical change in their sound.

After the release of Boxcar, the band began touring around the United States.

=== Pinkeye ===
Before the new album's release, the band debuted much of the new material in outside stage matinée performances at the College of the Sequoias in Visalia, to stunned audiences. The music featured dramatic twists, tempo changes, stops and starts that seemed ironically rhythmic.

The music still felt at home in the punk shows, because it has retained its brashness (and in some tracks, high speed tempos) in spite of the original approaches.

Pinkeye, the band's first full length 12-inch album, was released via Lookout! Records in 1989, and was recorded at A.I.R. by Gray Gregson.

A friend of the band, Tony Sevener, loaned Hudgens a wide array of cymbals that helped the drum sound stretch out a little, along with some experimental drum effects by Gray. The new material was also performed on local Public-access television cable TV show, "The Shout Club".

Visalia pro skater Tom Knox met the band and most of Pinkeye appeared on Santa Cruz Skateboards' Strange Notes No. 3.

=== Rejection ===
Tim Biskup presented two different pressings of Rejection on Duck Butter Records, one of the pressings having hand screened art and clear red vinyl.

The Rejection era was an enthusiastic period, because the Rejection EP was recorded and released in Fresno. Ironically enough, the band got popular across the country first before they did locally due to the albums and touring, using the Berkeley/East Bay area as a springboard. Even though the band had roots in Fresno, they only really knew a handful of people, mostly from the Capitol Punishment camp (due to the distance from Visalia) and this release brought them more inside the scene. Tim opened different doors and they met many new friends. Many more live performances in different venues in the city started happening. The local scene received the majority of the hand-screened versions.

The evolution of the music continued, some of the more conventional approaches still on Pinkeye (even though that album was very original) can be heard melting away.

Travis acquired an Ibanez left-handed bass guitar and also came across an Ampeg combo bass amplifier which would later define his sound on the albums and tours to come.

Matt started experimenting with Yamaha SBG Model guitars.

"I sat on a milk crate that Matt got for me to play drums from the beginning all the way to Rejection. We also used it to haul the stands and the pedal. If I broke one I just went to the back of a grocery store and got another one. I played a nice Yamaha kit I got before Pinkeye but couldn't make the payments and had to go back to pieced together pieces of crap." -Don said.

=== Mind Tracing the Going Down ===
David Hayes presented Mind Tracing the Going Down, Plaid Retina's second full-length album, in 1991 on Very Small Records. The album was recorded by Billy Anderson at the Razor's Edge in San Francisco.

If Rejection was a local breakthrough, Mind Tracing did the same for the band in the San Francisco Bay Area. Many more Bay Area gigs were to follow in venues not just in the East Bay, along with significant new friendships forged with bands such as Schlong, False Sacrament, Neurosis and Victim's Family.

Brad Weaver joined the band. Around this time, Matt Morris put together certain pieces of equipment that helped define his sound: a Mesa/Boogie amplifier (from the factory, purchased around the time of recording the album) in conjunction with a Roland JC-120 amplifier, a Paul Reed Smith guitar, and a complex, well defined system of delay and other effects.

Going Down CD, 1991 Shmin Esso / Duck Butter SE / DB021

Not long after its release, Matt teamed up with Tim Biskup to release Mind Tracing on the dual Shmin Esso / Duck Butter conglomerate, Shmin Esso being Matt's label.

=== The Spark. ===
The Spark. was an EP released on Very Small Records and recorded at Sergay's Recording Emporium in the San Francisco Bay Area.

At that time, Hudgens got a Tama drum kit.

=== Dead End Mind ===
Third full-length album on Very Small Records, recorded at House of Faith, Northern California. First to be released on compact disc.

=== What I Can't Have ===
EP on Joey Edwards' Little Deputy Records. Recorded by Scott Greenall in Garden Grove California, before the band moved to Austin, Texas.

While still in California, Don acquired a Gretsch drum kit (which will define his sound through the remaining years).

In Austin, Mark Hughes joined on keyboards and Travis switched equipment from his Ampeg to a new Trace Elliot rig .

=== Unreleased album ===
The band recorded in Memphis an unreleased album. However, the song "Sperm" made it out as a single for a heavy metal compilation.

=== Breakup ===
The band broke up in 1996 in Austin, Texas.

== Discography ==
- Plaid Retina - Lookout! Records (1988, 7-inch vinyl)
- Boxcar - Musical Tragedies (1990, 7-inch vinyl)
- Pinkeye - Lookout! Records (1989, 12-inch vinyl)
- Rejection - Duck Butter Records (1990, 7-inch vinyl)
- Mind Tracing The Going Down - Very Small Records (1991, 12-inch vinyl)
  - Also released on compact disc via Shmin Esso/Duck Butter Records in 1991
- The Spark. - Very Small Records (1993, 7-inch vinyl)
- What I Cant Have - Little Deputy Records (19??, 7-inch vinyl)
