= Jeff Ott =

- Born: June 24, 1970 (age 55); Oakland, California
- Origin: Berkeley, California
- Genres: Punk rock
- Occupations: Singer, author, activist, musician
- Instruments: Guitar, vocals
- Labels: Lookout!, Sub City Records, Wind-up Records

Jeff Ott (born June 24, 1970) is an activist, musician, author, and longtime member of the Berkeley punk community, best known for playing guitar and singing in the bands Crimpshrine and Fifteen.

== Early life ==
Ott was born on June 24, 1970, in Oakland, California, and began playing music at the age of four. He was physically and sexually abused as a child and ran away from home at the age of 13. Ott became a gutter punk, living on the streets of Berkeley for 11 years.

== Crimpshrine: 1982-1989 ==
Ott joined his first band, S.A.G., in 1982 at age 12. His 13-year-old friends Aaron Cometbus and Jesse Michaels (later of Operation Ivy) played guitar and sang. Ott started out on drums but soon swapped instruments with Cometbus. Michaels described Ott as "twenty times better than us", and Ott admits that he "didn't know any chords, so I played with my thumb." When Michaels left the group in 1984 Ott took up vocals and the band changed its name to Crimpshrine, derived from a nickname for a girl they knew who had "bleached-blond, burned, crimped hair." As the group developed, Ott began experimenting with playing synthesizer and piano, until joined by bassist Pete Rypins in October 1986 and began gigging locally. Ott was often asked if he was a fan of early Belfast punk group Stiff Little Fingers because of his rough vocal style, but neither he nor the other members of Crimpshrine had heard the Northern Irish band until after the ongoing comparisons.

In 1987 Crimpshrine made a demo tape, contributed songs to Maximumrocknroll's Turn It Around! compilation, and recorded their debut EP Sleep, What's That?, released in early 1988 on the newly founded label Lookout! Records. The album Lame Gig Contest followed, released in Europe on Germany's Musical Tragedies label. Though unreleased in the U.S., L.A. Weekly would name it one of the top five albums of pre-commercial pop punk.

In the fall of 88 Crimpshrine embarked on their sole U.S. tour. Halfway through, Bryant and Rypins left, stranding Ott and Cometbus in Florida. Members of Screeching Weasel drove out from Chicago to help them finish their tour. When Crimpshrine returned to the Bay Area, Paul Curran joined on bass and they recorded one final EP before disbanding in 1989.

== Fifteen: 1989-2000 ==
With Jack Curran, Ott formed a new group called Fifteen, who went on to record two LPs for Lookout! Records and several more on a few smaller labels. For Fifteen, Ott changed his singing style drastically in order to save his voice. The group went through many lineup changes before breaking up in 1996, and then reformed in 1997, only to break up again in 2000.

== Solo career and after: 2000-present ==
Toward the end of Fifteen, Ott released the 1998 solo acoustic album, Epithysial Union, which also featured songs by Amanda Ketchum (billed only as "Amanda'"). In 2000 Ott sold everything he had to buy a house and support his children. He pursued a solo career for several years, releasing the double album, Will Work for Diapers in 2003. In 2003 he entered nursing school and went on to train as a nurse practitioner. In 2007 he stopped recording music in order to devote more time to his studies. In December 2011 his band Fifteen reunited to play two Bay Area benefit shows. He now is a nurse and is helping drug addicts.

As of 2025, Ott is a member of Bay Area Punk band, Dollar Store. The four-piece released their first album, Gentleman Nation, on May 23rd.

== Writing ==
Ott's politically charged lyrics tackle issues such as racism, homophobia, misogyny, classism, drug abuse, needle exchange, civil rights, gender roles, homelessness, addiction, environmentalism, social injustice, political conspiracy, and rape. His solo work uses many of the same songs and lyrical themes as his rock-band work.

He has also published two books: 2000's My World: Ramblings of an Aging Gutter Punk (ISBN 0-9677287-0-3) consists of excerpts from his self-published zine of the same name, and 2005's Weapons of Mass Destruction and the Real War on Terror (ISBN 0-9677287-1-1), focusing on domestic violence, police brutality, sexual abuse, and how he sees these issues as more urgent and credible than the war on terror. Both books were published by Sub City Records.
