= Sewer Trout =

US musical group

- Origin: Sacramento, California, United States
- Genres: Punk rock, pop punk
- Years active: 1985–1990
- Labels: Lookout!, Very Small
- Past members: Jim MacLean; Hal MacLean; Keith Lehtinen; Erik Benson

Sewer Trout was an American punk rock band, from Sacramento, California in 1985. The group's uptempo bass lines and fast-paced songs would serve as a basis and influence for many of the later California pop punk bands of the 1990s. The band consisted of Jim MacLean (lead vocals/bass), his brother Hal MacLean (drums), and Keith Lehtinen (guitar/backing vocals), with Erik Benson joining as a second guitarist after meeting Hal at Sacramento State. Although Benson's progressive rock influences eventually led to him being kicked out after one disastrous show in Davis, California. Jim and Hal joined forces with Erik to form Oyster Toilet Mango and eventually the Well Hung Monks. Sewer Trout broke up when Jim moved to Corvallis, Oregon to join the Beaver's Geology Department and earn his master's degree. While in Corvallis, Jim formed the bluegrass-hilbilly-punk band Elmer which took the Sewer Trout style punk to new levels of backwoods punk n roll sophistication.

== History ==
The MacLean brothers developed many of the Sewer Trout songs in 1984 while Jim was in college at Sac State and Hal was in High School in Concord, California. Jim mailed cassettes of songs (bass guitar riffs) to Hal who created drum parts. On school breaks, they recorded a demo and soon after got high school buddy, Keith, to join on guitar. Hal joined Jim at Sac State in 1985, and Keith eventually moved from Concord to San Francisco. The group was a fixture of the early 924 Gilman Street scene and its first release was on the Maximumrocknroll compilation album Turn It Around! in October 1987. The same year saw the group's first record released through Lookout! Records. A few more records followed on Lookout!, Very Small Records, and their own label, One Shot Flop. All of Sewer Trout's material was later released as the compilation album From the Forgotten Memories of Punks Failed Hopes and Dreams Loom in 1997. The vinyl versions were also released in 2021 on Lava Socks and Dead Broke records.

Sewer Trout were friends with David Hayes, the co-founder of Lookout! Records and the owner of Very Small Records. Through his labels, Hayes was able to focus a lot of attention on the Sacramento punk scene, often filling his compilations with up to ten Sacramento bands.

On December 1, 2005, a message was posted on Sewer Trout's Myspace announcing that Jim MacLean had committed suicide. The message stated "MacLean took his own life Monday or Tuesday after the Thanksgiving weekend. Jim may be gone, but his music will live forever."

== Band members ==
- Jim MacLean - lead vocals, bass (1985-1990) (deceased)
- Keith Lehtinen - guitar, backing vocals (1985-1990) (deceased)
- Hal MacLean - drums (1985-1990)
- Erik Benson - guitar (1988)

== Discography ==
=== Releases ===
- From the Bowels of Suburbia Emerge... (demo) (1985)
- Songs About Drinking (EP) - Lookout! Records (1987)
- Sewer Trout for President (EP) - One Shot Flop (1988)
- Flawless (10-inch EP) - Very Small Records (1989)
- From the Forgotten Memories of Punks Failed Hopes and Dreams Loom - Spa Records (1997)
- Meet the Sewer Trout (LP) - Lava Socks and Dead Broke Records (2021)

=== Compilation appearances ===
- "Sewer Trout for President" on Lethal Noise, Vol. 2 - David Hayes self-released cassette (1987)
- "Wally and the Beaver Go to Nicaragua" on Turn It Around! - Maximumrocknroll (1987)
- "Sex Trout" on We've Got Your Shorts (EP) - Fascist Food Records (1988)
- "Vagina Envy" on The Thing That Ate Floyd - Lookout! Records (1988)
- "Bang 'Ol Lulu" and "Holiday in Romania" on Alone in This World - Bat Guano Records (1989)
- "Holiday in Romania" on Four Two Pudding - Very Small Records (1993)
