= Cringer (band) =

American punk rock group

- Origin: Manoa, Hawaii, United States
- Genres: Punk rock, pop punk
- Years active: 1985–1991
- Spinoffs: J Church
- Past members: Lance Hahn; Gardner Maxam; Ed Tarantino; David Carr; Francis Sippin; Simon Barry; Derek Imose; Nigel Wong; Dave Gomez; Harry Sherrill; Kamala Parks

Cringer was an American punk rock band originally from Manoa, Hawaii, and active from 1985 to 1991. Lance Hahn and Gardner Maxam formed the group and remained its two consistent members, and later founded J Church. Cringer released a series of vinyl records and were formative in the Hawaiian punk rock community before relocating to Los Angeles and later San Francisco.

At the time of his death in 2007, songwriter Hahn was remembered for his prolific output, dedication to art and activism, and representation of Asian Americans in punk rock.

== History ==
Cringer took its name from the talking cat in the animated series He-Man and the Masters of the Universe. With Hahn playing guitar and Maxam singing, the group's first lineup included bassist Ed Tarantino and drummer David Carr. This era yielded several demo cassettes and the 7" Perversion Is Their Destiny.

After Tarantino and Carr left the band, its new lineup comprised Maxam on bass guitar, Hahn playing drums, guitarist Simon Barry, and vocalist Francis Sippin. Sippin's tenure was brief, however, and Hahn and Maxam became lead vocalists. This lineup recorded the Zen Flesh, Zen Bones 7". Drummer Derek Imose joined thereafter and Simon departed, with Hahn returning to guitar.

The group had relocated to Los Angeles, where Maxam was attending college. They played with a lineup including guitarist Nigel Wong and recorded the Tikki Tikki Tembo No Sa Rembo Chari Bari Ruchi Pip Peri Pembo album, taking its name from a 1968 picture book set in ancient China. Wong departed and was replaced briefly by Dave Gomez.

In 1989, Hahn, Maxam, and Imose moved to San Francisco and were joined by second guitarist Harry Sherrill. This lineup released the Karin 7" on Lookout! Records. Imose was later replaced by drummer Kamala Parks, punk tour booker, co-founder of 924 Gilman Street, and later of the bands Naked Aggression, Hers Never Existed, The Gr'ups, and Plot 66. This lineup released several 7" singles and toured the United States, England, and Europe extensively with Citizen Fish. They also played several multi-day stints with Green Day, Neurosis, the Offspring, and Thatcher on Acid.

Cringer disbanded in 1991. Several posthumous releases followed, including the final Rain 7" and the Greatest Hits Vol. 1 compilation. After the breakup, Hahn and Maxam formed J Church. Maxam remained with them until 1998, and Hahn kept the band active until his death in October 2007. In 2018, Parks and three musicians formed Cringeworthy, a tribute band playing the songs of Cringer and J Church.

== Members ==
- Lance Hahn – guitar (1985–1986, 1988–1991), lead vocals (1986–1991), drums (1986–1988)
- Gardner Maxam – lead vocals (1985–1986), bass guitar and vocals (1986–1991)
- Ed Tarantino – bass guitar (1985–1986)
- David Carr – drums (1985–1986)
- Francis Sippin – lead vocals (1986)
- Simon Barry – guitar and vocals (1986–1988)
- Derek Imose – drums (1988–1990)
- Nigel Wong – guitar (1988–1989)
- Dave Gomez – guitar (1989)
- Harry Sherrill – guitar (1989–1991)
- Kamala Parks – drums (1990–1991)

Timeline

== Discography ==
Albums

- The Vinegar Tasters (Cassette tape, 1986. Vinyl reissue on Honey Bear Records, 2002)
- Tikki Tikki Tembo, No Sa Rembo, Chari Bari Ruchi, Pip Peri Pembo (Vinyl Communications, 1990)

Live albums

- 23 Minutes For Fans (Hawaiian Express Records, 2001)

Compilations

- Greatest Hits, Vol. 1 (Vinyl Communications, 1993)
- We're All AOK (Hawaiian Express Records, 2012)

Singles

- Perversion Is Their Destiny 7" (Honey Bear Records, 1987)
- Zen Flesh, Zen Bones 7" (Vinyl Communications, 1988)
- Karin 7" (Lookout! Records, 1990)
- Time for a Little Something... 7" (Vinyl Communications, 1991)
- Live in Europe 7" (Vinyl Communications, 1991)
- Rain 7" (Vinyl Communications, 1992)
