= Behind Enemy Lines (band) =

American crust punk band

- Origin: Pittsburgh, Pennsylvania, United States
- Genres: Crust punk
- Years active: 2000–present
- Members: Mary Bielich; Dave Trenga; Matt Garabedian; Matt Tuite
- Past members: Bill Chamberlain; Matt Sachs; Ken Houser

Behind Enemy Lines is an American crust punk band, based in Pittsburgh, Pennsylvania. They play in a crossover thrash style of anarchist crust punk and thrash metal. The band features vocalist Dave Trenga and drummer Matt Garabedian, both of Aus-Rotten, Mary Bielich (Penance, Mythic, Mud City Manglers, Novembers Doom, Derketa, Wormhole) and Matt Tuite (Wickerman, Penance, Blackfinger, Devil Bell Hippies, Mud City Manglers) and formerly guitarist Bill Chamberlain of The Pist and Caustic Christ.

== Biography ==
=== History ===
In late 2000, after the dissolution of Aus-Rotten, two former members of that band, Dave Trenga and Matt Garabedian, formed Behind Enemy Lines along with Bill Chamberlain (also of The Pist and Caustic Christ) on guitar, and Matt Sachs, formerly of Devastation on bass. Mary Bielich and Matt Tuite (both former members of Pittsburgh doom metal band Penance) joined later, playing bass and guitar respectively.

In 2007, Chamberlain was replaced by Ken Houser.

== Lyrical themes ==
Lyrics covered a range of political topics, including: animal rights, environmentalism, human rights, LGBT rights, anti-religion and anti-capitalism. The band is noted for its harsh criticism of George W. Bush, especially on issues concerning the Iraq War, Abu Ghraib, subversion of human rights under the Patriot Act and the government response to Hurricane Katrina.

Dave Trenga wrote essays detailing his political opinion on both his Myspace blog and Behind Enemy Line's website. He demonstrated a strong distaste for Christianity, stating "I have never seen such a hateful and intolerant movement infiltrate every aspect of our lives as the current Christian movement in America has" and concluded, "I only hope I see this movement fall in my lifetime."

== Discography ==
- Know Your Enemy (2002) Tribal War Records
  - Re-released 2005 on Profane Existence Records
- The Global Cannibal (2003) US LP & CD on Antagony Media, European LP on Alerta Antifascista Records
- One Nation Under the Iron Fist of God (2006) Profane Existence Records

== Members ==
=== Current members ===
- Dave Trenga – lead vocals (2000-2009, 2015–present)
- Matt Garabedian – drums (2000-2009, 2015–present)
- "Metal" Mary Bielich – bass (2002-2008, 2015–present)
- Matt Tuite – guitar (2000-2009, 2015–present)

=== Former Members ===
- Matt Sachs – bass (2000-2002, 2008-2009)
- Bill Chamberlain – guitar (2000–2007)
- Ken Houser – guitar (2007)

Timeline
