= Very Small Records =

- Founded: 1989
- Founder: David Hayes
- Defunct: 2003
- Status: Defunct
- Genre: Punk rock, hardcore punk
- Country of origin: U.S.
- Location: Emeryville, California

Very Small Records was an independent record label, formed in 1989 by David Hayes, co-founder and former co-owner of Lookout Records. The name of the label was changed to Too Many Records around 1994, but was changed back around 1997. The label terminated in 2003.

== History ==
=== Formation ===
Lookout Records was first founded in Laytonville, California in the spring of 1987 as a device to put out the first album by The Lookouts, a punk rock band featuring Larry Livermore (née Lawrence Hayes). Following the release of the LP the label would remain dormant for the rest of 1987. The year was an exciting one in the East Bay, however, with the explosion of a vibrant musical scene around the Gilman Street Project, closely associated with the influential monthly punk fanzine Maximumrocknroll (MRR).

Livermore decided to launch Lookout as a general record label as a means of documenting the new Gilman bands, entering into a business partnership with David Hayes (no relation), who had previously been instrumental in preparing a compilation album released by MRR. In January 1988 the new Lookout burst into the world with the simultaneous release of four 7-inch EP records, including releases by legendary East Bay groups Crimpshrine, Isocracy, and Operation Ivy.

After two years of rapid-fire releases, Livermore and Hayes would soon suffer an acrimonious parting of the ways. David Hayes left to start his own Berkeley-based label, which he named Very Small Records, with Livermore retaining the name and back-catalog of Lookout — which would ultimately explode in popularity, powered by such associated East Bay bands as Operation Ivy and Green Day. Very Small Records, by way of contrast, would remain very small, continuing to produce a great number of its releases on the comparatively unprofitable 7-inch vinyl format.

=== Name changes ===
In 1994 Hayes changed the name of his label from Very Small Records to Too Many Records. The label would remain under the new name until 1997, at which time the old name and logo was restored.

=== Termination ===
The label's final record, catalog number VSR-88, was released in 2003.

== Artists ==
- 23 More Minutes
- 3 Finger Spread
- Big Comb
- Cause
- Clabberhag
- Corrupted Morals
- Counterclock
- Dwarf Bitch
- Econochrist
- Elmer
- False Sacrament
- The Flies
- Hellworms
- Horny Mormons
- Humpy
- Intifada
- Jawbreaker
- Less Than Jake
- The Lizards
- Logical Nonsense
- Lopez
- Meatjack
- Nar
- Nuisance
- One Eye Open
- Operation Ivy
- Pinhead Gunpowder
- Plaid Retina
- Pounded Clown
- Schlong
- Sea Pigs
- Sewer Trout
- Sick-N-Tired
- Sleep
- Soup
- Toilet of Power
- Velvet Pelvis
- Voodoo Glow Skulls
