= Caustic Christ =

American crusty hardcore punk band

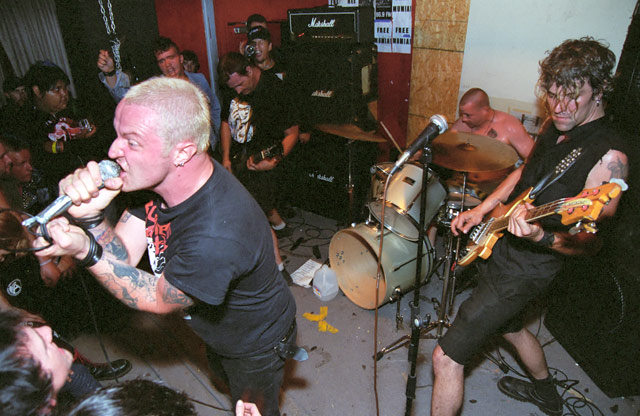

Background information
- Origin: Pittsburgh, Pennsylvania, United States
- Genres: Hardcore punk, crust punk
- Years active: 2000–2009
- Label: Havoc Records
- Members: Mistaken Ukla Von Upenstien; GenEric Christ; Bill Christ; Archie Punker

Caustic Christ was an American crusty hardcore punk band from Pittsburgh, Pennsylvania, United States. They were on Havoc Records. The band is composed of vocalist GenEric Christ, guitarist Bill Christ, bassist Mistaken Ukla Von Upenstien, and drummer Archie Punker.

== History ==
In late 2000, guitarist Bill Chamberlain (of Mankind?, The Pist, and React) quit React and moved from Connecticut to Pittsburgh to start a band with guitarist/vocalist Eric Good and bassist Corey Lyons of Aus-Rotten. Together with drummer Ron Wingrove, they began to practice in Corey, Eric, and Bill's basement; played local shows and a few weekend tours; and recorded a demo. During that time, Aus-Rotten broke up and Chamberlain also formed Behind Enemy Lines with former Aus-Rotten vocalist Dave Trenga.

In the spring of 2001, Wingrove was struck by a pickup truck while riding his bike in Pittsburgh and sustained brain damage. This left him unable to play drums for some time, and the band decided to replace him. Wingrove would later return to his hometown of Uniontown, Pennsylvania, where he would participate in several bands. After a hiatus, drummer Greg Mairs (Submachine, Short Dark Strangers) joined the band. This was supposed to be a temporary solution while the band found another, less busy, drummer, but Mairs remained and became an integral part of the band.

With Mairs, Caustic Christ recorded their first seven-inch record, which was released on Havoc Records, as were all of their subsequent releases. They toured the United States extensively with bands like Subhumans and Municipal Waste and were interviewed in Maximum RocknRoll, HeartattaCk, Suburban Voice, and numerous other punk zines. In 2006, they toured Europe. Local favorites, the band performed frequently at Mr. Roboto Project, a venue then in Wilkinsburg, Pennsylvania.

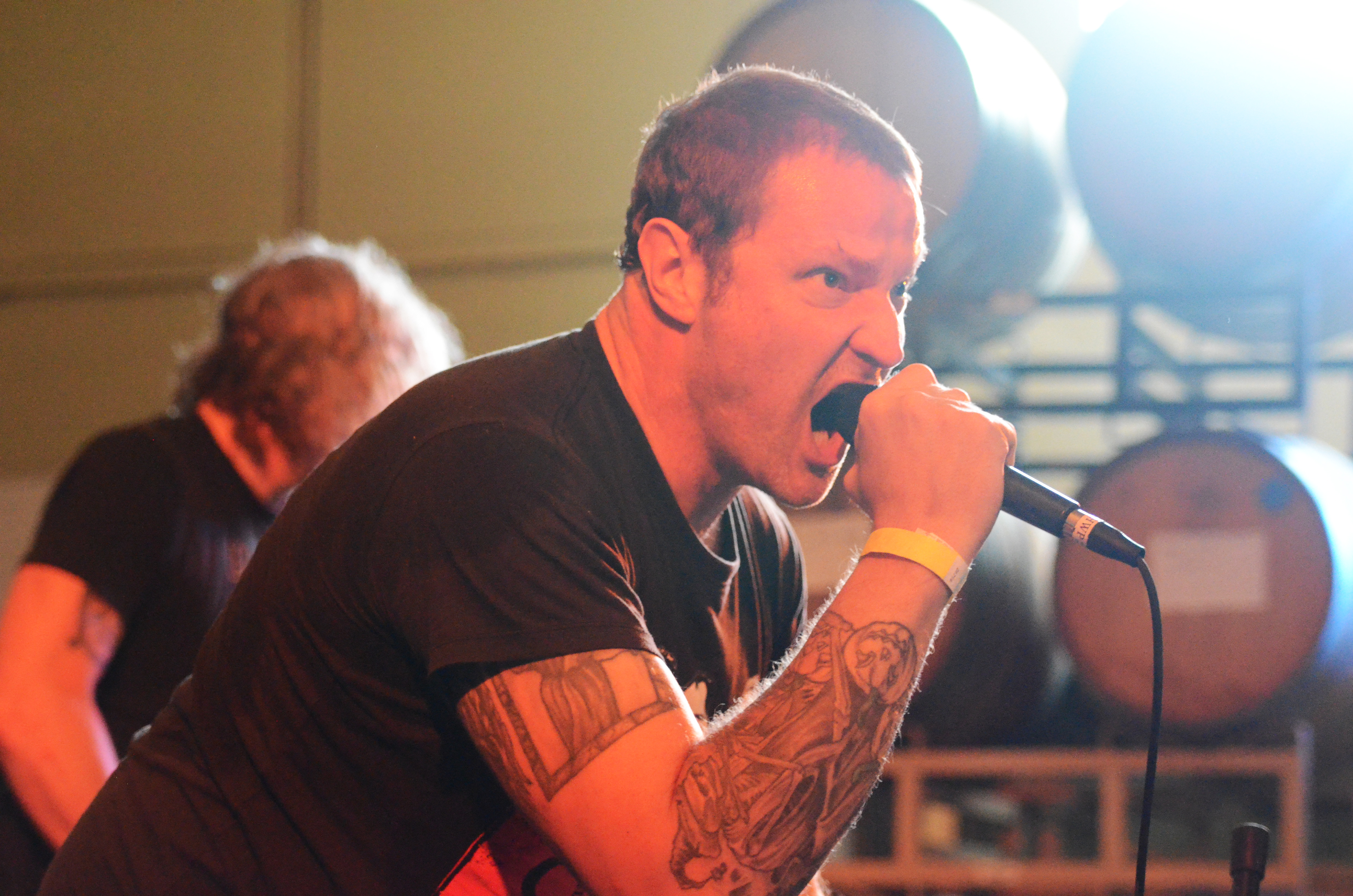
Live at Brandon Ferrell memorial/LBug benefit in 2016 (at Hardywood in Richmond, Virginia)

Caustic Christ disbanded following their last show, on May 5, 2009.. However, in 2015, the band reunited to play two shows as part of the annual Skull Fest in Pittsburgh. In 2016, the band played a benefit in Richmond, Virginia, for the family of Brandon Ferrell alongside Municipal Waste, Career Suicide, Night Birds, Blood Pressure, and a reunited Double Negative.

== Releases ==
- Caustic Christ 7" (Havoc Records, 2001)
- Can't Relate LP (Havoc Records, 2003)
- Government Job 7" (Havoc Records, 2004)
- Public Service/Jodie Foster limited tour single (Havoc Records, 2005)
- Lycanthropy LP (Havoc Records, 2006)

=== Splits and compilations ===
- Go Down Fighting, Come Up Smiling CD compilation (Hardtravelin' Records, 2001)
- Split 7" with Intense Youth (Behold The Youthquake Records, 2002)
- Split 7" with R.A.M.B.O. (Busted Heads Records, 2003)
- Dark Thoughts compilation (Rabid Dogs Records, 2003)
- Half Life - Under The Knife covers compilation 7" (Moo Cow Records, 2004)
- Revolved Back To Failure cassette compilation (Hardtravelin' Records, 2005)

== Members ==
- The Oftenly Mistaken Ukla Von Upenstien - Bass
- GenEric Christ - Vocals
- Bill Christ - Guitar
- Archie Punker - Drums
