= Spitboy =

American anarcho-punk band

- Spitboy performing live in 1994

Background information
- Origin: San Francisco, California, U.S.
- Genres: Hardcore punk; anarcho-punk; post-hardcore
- Years active: 1990–1995
- Labels: Ebullition; Lookout; Allied; Don Giovanni
- Spinoffs: Instant Girl
- Members: Adrienne Droogas; Michelle Cruz Gonzales; Karin Gembus; Dominique Davison
- Past members: Paula Hibbs-Rines
- Website: spitboy.bandcamp.com

Spitboy was an American anarcho-punk band from the San Francisco Bay area, founded in 1990. The all-female band was known for aggressively criticizing patriarchy and gender roles through their political lyricism, but did not associate with the contemporaneous riot grrrl movement. Spitboy released several records (most notably a split album with Los Crudos) and toured extensively during their tenure before disbanding in 1995. Following their dissolution, members of the band later played in other hardcore punk acts such as Instant Girl and Aus Rotten, while drummer Michelle Cruz Gonzales and vocalist Adrienne Droogas have since been active as writers.

== History ==
Spitboy was formed by drummer Michelle "Todd" Gonzales, vocalist Adrienne Droogas, bassist Paula Hibbs-Rines, and guitarist Karin Gembus in 1990. Paula left the band before the release of their Rasana EP, and was replaced by Dominique Davison.

Throughout their stint, the band toured the United States, Europe, Australia, New Zealand, and Japan. Their records were primarily released on prominent punk rock labels including Lookout Records, Ebullition Records, and Allied Recordings. In 1995, Spitboy released a split-LP with influential Chicago-based hardcore punk band Los Crudos. The album serves as Spitboy's final release as a band, and it remains the most popular record ever released on Ebulliton to date.

=== Post-breakup activities ===
After their breakup, Davison, Gonzales, and Gembus formed a short-lived band together called Instant Girl, whose sound was less aggressive than that of Spitboy. Instant Girl released a single full-length, titled Post-Coital, on Allied before disbanding in 1997. Droogas briefly joined Aus Rotten as the drummer but left and eventually moved to Richmond, Virginia, afterwards. She also wrote columns for punk zines such as Heartattack and Profane Existence. Davison is now an architect and owner of DRAW in Kansas City. Gonzales teaches English at Las Positas College in Livermore, California, and has since published zines and memoirs on her time as a member of Spitboy.

In April 2021, it was announced that the band would be releasing a compilation album of their complete discography, titled Body Of Work 1990 - 1995 All The Songs, on Don Giovanni Records. The first single, "What Are Little Girls Made Of?", was released in May 2021, and the full album later released on June 25 of that year.

== Legacy ==
Spitboy has had a large impact on punk. Fans of the band include fellow musicians Alice Bag and Billie Joe Armstrong of Green Day as well as members of Fugazi, Operation Ivy, Neurosis, and Citizen Fish.

== Band members ==
=== Final lineup ===
- Adrienne Droogas – vocals (1990–1995)
- Karin Gembus – guitar, backing vocals (1990–1995)
- Michelle "Todd" Gonzales – drums, backing vocals (1990–1995)
- Dominique Davison – bass, backing vocals (1994–1995)

=== Former members ===
- Paula Hibbs-Rines – bass, backing vocals (1990–1994)

== Discography ==
=== Studio albums ===
- True Self Revealed (1993, Ebullition)
- Viviendo Asperamente = Roughly Living - split w/ Los Crudos (1995, Ebullition)

=== Extended plays ===
- Spitboy (1992, Lookout)
- Mi Cuerpo Es Mio (1994, Allied)
- Rasana (1995, Ebullition)

=== Demos ===
- Spitboy (1991, Self-released)

=== Compilation albums ===
- The Spitboy CD (1994, Allied)
- Body Of Work 1990 - 1995 All The Songs (2021, Don Giovanni Records)

== See also ==
- Anarchism and the arts
- Anarchist symbolism
- Animal rights and punk subculture
