= Isocracy (band) =

American punk rock band

- Origin: Berkeley, California, United States
- Genres: Hardcore punk, punk rock
- Years active: 1986–1988
- Labels: Lookout!
- Past members: Jason Beebout; Lenny Johnson; Martin Brome; Al Sobrante

Isocracy was an American punk rock band from the Berkeley, California-area, formed in 1986. The band was one of the key bands in the MRR/Gilman Street project. John Kiffmeyer (a.k.a. Al Sobrante), who later went on to play for Green Day, was the drummer for the band. The other members were Lenny Johnson (guitar), Martin Brohm (bass) and Jason Beebout (vocals), who went on to form Samiam.

== History ==
The group recorded a 10-song 7″ EP titled Bedtime for Isocracy, released in 1988 through Lookout! Records (L005). The band was later featured on the Lookout! Records' compilation, The Thing That Ate Floyd. Additionally, Isocracy's EP tracks were re-released on (L293) Punk Rock 7″s Volume 1. During their active years from 1986 through 1988, Isocracy was known for their wild performances where anything could happen. According to the book written about the Gilman St. Project, Isocracy was one of the main bands who brought a new sense of positive anarchy to the punk scene. During this time in the mid-1980s hardcore punk was the dominant musical style in the scene. Isocracy's live shows included playing in laundromats and covering the audience with garbage and shredded paper. In this regard, Isocracy bridged hardcore punk with performance art. Green Day benefited from Sobrante's contacts he had made in the scene prior to their formation. Isocracy is featured in the Green Day-funded 2017 documentary Turn It Around: The Story of East Bay Punk.

== Discography ==
=== Releases ===
- Bedtime for Isocracy (EP) - Lookout! Records (1988)

=== Compilation appearances ===
- "Fuck This" on Lethal Noise, Vol. 2 - David Hayes self-released cassette (1987)
- "Confederate Flags" and "Z.B.H.R." on Turn It Around! - Maximumrocknroll (1987)
- "Happy Now" on The Thing That Ate Floyd - Lookout (1988)
