= Crimpshrine =

American punk rock band

- Origin: Berkeley, California, United States
- Genre: Punk rock
- Years active: 1982–1989
- Label: Lookout
- Past members: Aaron Cometbus; Jeff Ott; Jesse Michaels; Pete Rypins; Tim Armstrong; Idon Bryant; Paul Curran; Harry Smith

Crimpshrine was an American punk rock band from Berkeley, California. The group was formed in 1982 by Aaron Cometbus, founder of the seminal punk rock zine Cometbus, and future Operation Ivy vocalist Jesse Michaels. They grew out of the East Bay scene, centered on 924 Gilman Street, and had an important influence on later East Bay bands such as Operation Ivy, Green Day and punk rock in general.

== History ==
=== Establishment (1982–1986) ===
Crimpshrine originally formed in 1982 under the name S.A.G. with Aaron Cometbus playing guitar and Jesse Michaels (later of Operation Ivy) on vocals, both 13 years old. Michaels initially attempted to play guitar, but "didn't know any chords, so I played with my thumb". According to Cometbus, the band had a "serious lack of equipment" during this time, as they had one drum and only three strings on the guitar, which was tuned to a barre chord. They quickly added friend Jeff Ott, then 12, on drums initially but switched to guitar soon after and Cometbus took over drums. Regarding Ott's guitar skills, Michaels described him as "twenty times better than us". Michaels was kicked out of the band in 1984, which he said was for "smoking too much pot", and Ott and Cometbus changed the band's name to Crimpshrine. According to Ott, the name came from a nickname for a girl they knew who had "bleached-blond, burned, crimped hair". The group initially wanted a female singer, but could not find one so Ott took over on vocals in late 1984 and they then went through various different line-ups during 1985. Ott began experimenting with playing synthesizer and piano, a man named Isaac joined on violin and Tim Armstrong (then known as Lint) played bass for a brief period. Pete Rypins joined as the group's bassist in October 1986 and, according to Cometbus, "started to get out of Jeff's basement and play some parties and shows".

=== Active years (1987–1989) ===
After Rypins joined, they played shows sporadically during its early years, with vocalist Ott living on the streets of Berkeley for a time. In February 1987, the group recorded their first demo tape at 924 Gilman Street, which received enough circulation that Maximumrocknroll asked the band to record songs for the magazine's upcoming compilation Turn It Around!, to which the band agreed and recorded "Another Day" and "Rearranged" in August. Shortly after, they went to Dangerous Rhythm Studios in Oakland, California, to record songs for their debut EP with producer/engineer Kevin Army. David Hayes, co-founder of Lookout Records, was impressed with the band and offered to release the tracks recorded at Dangerous Rhythm. The group agreed and their debut EP, Sleep, What's That?, was released in January 1988. Idon Bryant, a friend of the band's, joined on second guitar soon after and they went to Dancing Dog Studios in Emeryville, California, to record their debut album in April. Although the recordings were turned down by Lookout, the band added tracks from previous sessions and released Lame Gig Contest in Germany on the label Musical Tragedies.

Crimpshrine then embarked on their only United States tour in September 1988. The tour was a contentious one, with Idon Bryant and Pete Rypins abruptly leaving the band in Gainesville, Florida, and heading home. Stuck in Florida without a bassist, friends Ben Weasel and John Jughead of Screeching Weasel drove out from Chicago to help them out and the former played bass with the band for two shows. A bit later when Screeching Weasel was without a drummer, Cometbus played drums with them for two shows around Chicago. Paul Curran was then courted to join Crimpshrine on bass, so he and his brother Jack drove out in a Ford Pinto and finished the tour with the band. After the tour in January 1989, they went to Dancing Dog Studios again and recorded what would end up being their final release, the Quit Talkin' Claude... EP.

=== Break-up and legacy ===
The group broke up in May 1989 shortly after the release of the Quit Talkin' Claude... EP. Cometbus went on to perform in Pinhead Gunpowder among many other bands, Ott went on to front Fifteen, Curran joined Monsula and Rypins became the bassist for Tilt and later the Tantrums.

In recent years, the band has been regarded as influential by many of their peers, including Operation Ivy, Green Day, Jawbreaker, Screeching Weasel and Less Than Jake, among others. A tribute album to both Crimpshrine and Fifteen, called Can You Spare a Dime?, was released in 1998 by Microcosm Publishing. Crimpshrine is featured in the 2017 documentary Turn It Around: The Story of East Bay Punk.

Although closely associated with the Gilman Street Project, Cometbus was quick to note in a 1988 interview with Flipside magazine that they were not a direct product of Gilman, having been established as a band years before the launch of the club. "We helped them as much as they helped us because we are a part of it just as much", Cometbus said.

== Band members ==
Main members

- Aaron Cometbus – drums (1984–1989), guitar (1982–1984)
- Jeff Ott – lead vocals, guitar (1984–1989), drums (1983–1984)
- Pete Rypins – bass, backing vocals (1986–1988)
- Idon Bryant – guitar (1988)
- Paul Curran – bass (1988–1989)

Other members

- Jesse Michaels – lead vocals (1982–1984)
- Lint – bass (1984)

Timeline

== Discography ==
Studio albums

- Lame Gig Contest (1989)

EPs

- Sleep, What's That? (1988)
- Quit Talkin' Claude... (1989)

Split EPs

- Closed Up, Caught Up and Fucked Up (with Mutley Chix) (1989)
- Burning Bridges (with G-Whiz) (1989)
- "Better Half" / "Sanctuary" (with Jawbreaker) (1993)

Compilation albums

- Duct Tape Soup (1992)
- The Sound of a New World Being Born (1998)

Other appearances

- "I Don't Know Why" on Bay Mud – Not on Label (1986)
- "2nd Generation Junkies" on Lethal Noise – Not on Label (1986)
- "Rearranged" on Lethal Noise, Vol. 2 – Not on Label (1987)
- "Another Day" and "Rearranged" on Turn It Around! – Maximumrocknroll (1987)
- "Trying Too Hard", "Sanctuary" and "Construction" on Caution – Skene! Records (1988)
- "Pick Up the Pieces" on The World's in Shreds: Volume 1 – Shredder Records (1988)
- "Summertime" on The Thing That Ate Floyd – Lookout! Records (1988)
- "Pretty Mess" on The World's in Shreds: Volume 2 – Shredder Records (1989)
- "Free Will" on Make the Collector Nerd Sweat – Very Small Records (1990)
- "Walk Away" and "I Don't Know Why" on Lest We Forget – BBT Tapes (1991)
- "Tomorrow" and "INXS/Going Home" on Benicia – Take a Day (1993)
