= Turn It Around! =

Compilation album by Various artists
- Released: October 1987; September 1991 (reissue)
- Recorded: August 1987
- Studio: Dangerous Rhythm (Oakland, California)
- Genre: Punk rock, hardcore punk
- Length: 30:01
- Label: Maximumrocknroll; Very Small Records (reissue)
- Producer: Kevin Army

Turn It Around! is a punk rock compilation album by Maximumrocknroll. Originally released as two 7-inch records in October 1987, it served as a benefit to raise money for the Berkeley, California DIY punk scene (known as the Gilman Street Project). The compilation featured the first appearances of many bands who would later become well known outside of the scene, including Operation Ivy, Crimpshrine and Isocracy. Due to the poor sound quality of the original 7-inch version, Turn It Around! was reissued by Very Small Records in September 1991 as one LP. However, the compilation is currently out of print and has never seen a CD release.

In retrospect, it has been cited as an important compilation album and served as an introduction to a number of the bands, most of which would go on to release albums on the then-newly formed Lookout Records. Many musicians from the later Gilman Street scene have cited Turn It Around! as an influence.

== Background and production ==
In the summer of 1987, Maximumrocknroll asked one of its writers, David Hayes, to put together a compilation album to raise money for the Gilman Street Project, the first wave of bands from the local Berkeley, California DIY punk scene centered on the 924 Gilman Street venue. Hayes agreed to do it, seeing this as an opportunity to document the bands from the scene, as almost all of them had no recordings available at that point. In preparation, Hayes set up a "Battle of the Bands" concert at 924 Gilman Street on June 14, 1987, featuring bands such as Corrupted Morals, Crimpshrine, Operation Ivy, Isocracy and Soup (the latter of which would not end up on Turn It Around!), with the idea being that the two best songs by each band would be released on the compilation. In August, after everything was chosen, most of the bands set out to record their songs with Kevin Army in one day at Dangerous Rhythm Studios in Oakland, California. Recorded on a small budget, Hayes shepherded the bands in and out of the studio "like an assembly line," as Operation Ivy guitarist Lint would later describe it, with bassist Matt McCall adding "you'd see the other band coming out while you were going in." Corrupted Morals, however recorded its track at Art of Ears Studio in San Francisco with Andy Ernst, while Nasal Sex went to Creative Sound in San Jose with Dick Dias and "Yeast Power" by the Yeastie Girlz was recorded on the soundboard at 924 Gilman Street with engineer Radley Hirsch. After the recordings were done, George Horn mastered the album at Fantasy Studios in Berkeley.

== Packaging ==
The title, Turn It Around!, was chosen by Maximumrocknroll founder Tim Yohannan in reference to the members of the Gilman Street Project trying to "reestablish a sense of community" within the underground punk scene. "At a time when the scene is plagued by mindless violence, intimidation, vandalism and general stupidity" Yohannan said, "when it's all becoming more like the mainstream than an alternative, there are groups of dedicated people who are determined to fight back and revitalize things." The front cover was done by Cammie Toloui of the Yeastie Girlz and features a photo of Maximumrocknroll writer Walter Glaser. Hayes handled the layout and packaging, and put together an extensive booklet of the bands' pictures and lyrics to all of the songs and sent the artwork to Positive Press in Oakland to be printed. It was later decided before release that the compilation would be on two 7-inch records, which Hayes said was a "statement, maybe we're trying to set an example to get people off of their asses and create something." He further stated that "Most distributors won't even take 7-inches to begin with, so we're obviously not in it for the money." The album was pressed at a pressing plant called Alberti in Monterey Park, California, which would later press vinyl for Lookout Records.

== Release and influence ==
Turn It Around! was released in early October 1987 with an original pressing of 2,000 copies that here numbered. The album was a success within the punk scene and it served as an introduction to the scene for many fans. Its initial pressing sold out by 1989 and was out of print for the next two years. In September 1991, Hayes reissued Turn It Around! on his own label Very Small Records. This version did not come with the booklet and did not have the original cover intact, instead cutting up images from the booklet and pasting them together to make the artwork. It was also released as one LP rather than the original double 7-inch. This was because of the length of the album, as each original 7-inch was about 15 minutes, resulting in its poor sound quality.

In recent years, Turn It Around! has been regarded as a classic punk compilation album and proved to be influential to many later Gilman Street bands. Many people of the scene have given it praise as well, including Larry Livermore and Chris Applegren of Lookout Records, who both called the compilation "legendary" on their blogs. Billie Joe Armstrong, vocalist-guitarist of Green Day, has also cited it as an influence, stating in an interview with Time magazine in 2010 that it was a "pretty big record for [him]".

== Track listing ==
Side one
No.	Title	Contributing artist	Length
1.	"Where Is He?"	Corrupted Morals	1:43
2.	"She's from Salinas"	Sweet Baby Jesus	2:00
3.	"Confederate Flags"	Isocracy	2:08
4.	"Gang Way"	No Use for a Name	2:01

Side two
No.	Title	Contributing artist	Length
5.	"Another Day"	Crimpshrine	2:40
6.	"I Got No"	Operation Ivy	1:15
7.	"Fun on the Freeway"	Stikky	1:49
8.	"Freezer Burn"	Nasal Sex	1:48

Side three
No.	Title	Contributing artist	Length
9.	"Yeast Power"	Yeastie Girlz	0:35
10.	"Contragate"	Rabid Lassie	1:43
11.	"Wally and the Beaver Go to Nicaragua"	Sewer Trout	2:11
12.	"Z.B.H.R."	Isocracy	0:56
13.	"Officer"	Operation Ivy	1:55

Side four
No.	Title	Contributing artist	Length
14.	"Pathetic"	Sweet Baby Jesus	1:49
15.	"Rearranged"	Crimpshrine	1:59
16.	"Moshometer"	Stikky	1:23
17.	"Two Taps"	Buggerall	2:25
Total length:			30:01

== Personnel ==
Corrupted Morals

- Rick Morgan – lead vocals
- Dan Boland – guitar
- Ray Sebastian – guitar
- Joel Wing – bass
- Jose Mariscol – drums

Sweet Baby Jesus

- Dallas Denery – lead vocals
- Matt Buenrostro – guitar
- Richie Bucher – bass, backing vocals
- Sergie Loobkoff – drums

Isocracy

- Jason Beebout – lead vocals
- Lenny Johnson – guitar, backing vocals
- Martin Brome – bass, backing vocals
- Al Sobrante – drums

No Use for a Name

- Ramon Gras – lead vocals
- Tony Sly – guitar, backing vocals
- Steve Papoutsis – bass
- Rory Koff – drums

Crimpshrine

- Jeff Ott – lead vocals, guitar
- Pete Rypins – bass, backing vocals
- Aaron Cometbus – drums

Operation Ivy

- Jesse Michaels (credited as "Shrik") – lead vocals
- Lint – guitar, backing vocals
- Matt McCall – bass, backing vocals
- Dave Mello (credited as "Animal") – drums, backing vocals
- Pat Mello (credited as "Skin") – backing vocals

Stikky

- Todd Wilder – lead vocals, drums
- Chris Wilder – guitar, vocals
- Chris Dodge – bass, vocals

Nasal Sex

- Andy Sacco – lead vocals, guitar
- Rocci Cirone – bass, backing vocals
- Joe Cirone – drums, backing vocals

Yeastie Girlz

- Joyce Jimenez – vocals
- Jane Guskin – vocals
- Cammie Toloui – vocals

Rabid Lassie

- Joey Vela – lead vocals
- Mike Pare – bass, backing vocals
- Trent Nelson – guitar, backing vocals
- Jason Hammon – guitar, backing vocals
- Wade Hoyt – drums

Sewer Trout

- Jim MacLean – lead vocals, bass
- Keith Lehtinan – guitar, backing vocals
- Hal MacLean – drums

Buggerall

- Chris Giese (credited as “Rum”) – lead vocals
- Richie Bucher (credited as “Roo”) – bass
- Ray Cooper (credited as “Tex”) – guitar, backing vocals
- Sergie Loobkoff (credited as “Brig”) – drums

=== Production ===
- Kevin Army – producer, engineer
- Andy Ernst – engineer on "Where Is He?"
- Dick Dias – engineer on "Freezer Burn"
- Radley Hirsch – engineer on "Yeast Power"
- George Horn – mastering
- Cammie Toloui – cover art, photography
- David Hayes – layout
- Chris Wilder – art direction
- Murray Bowles; Joel Wing; Anne Marie; Mark; Wayne van der Kuil – photography

== See also ==
- Turn It Around: The Story of East Bay Punk
