= Profane Existence =

- Founded: 1989
- Genre: Anarcho-punk, hardcore punk, extreme metal
- Country of origin: United States
- Location: Minneapolis, Minnesota
- Official website: profaneexistence.com

Profane Existence is a Minneapolis-based anarcho-punk collective. Established in 1989, the collective publishes a nationally known zine (also called Profane Existence), as well as releasing and distributing anarcho-punk, crust, and grindcore music, and printing and publishing pamphlets and literature. Stacy Thompson describes the collective as "the largest, longest-lasting, and most influential collective in Anarcho-Punk so far." The collective folded in 1998, although its distribution arm, then called Blackened Distribution, continued operating. It restarted in 2000. "Making punk a threat again" is the group's slogan.

== History ==
Profane Existence
- Publisher: Profane Existence Collective
- Founder: Dan Siskind
- Founded: 1989
- First issue: 1989
- Final issue: 2013
- Based in: Minneapolis, Minnesota
- Website: profaneexistence.org/magazine/
- OCLC: 23072105

Launched in 1989, the Profane Existence magazine has been described as "the largest of the anarchist Punk fanzines in North America." The magazine deals with a very broad range of topics, including veganism, animal, women's and minority rights, anti-fascist action and the punk lifestyle. It published feature articles, interviews, reports on local scenes around the world, editorials, letters, "how-to" articles, and so on. Thompson writes that the zine "functions as [a newspaper] for many Anarcho-Punks, especially those in the Twin Cities area." Until it ceased publication in 1998 Profane Existence was free in the Twin Cities and cost $1–3 elsewhere; then as now customers who order the zine through the mail are only charged for shipping. The zine was initially published in a black and white tabloid format. It switched to an 8½ x 11" magazine format with issue #23 (Autumn 1994) but returned to a tabloid format (now with color front and back covers) with issue #38 (Spring 2000).

In 1992 the group co-published (with Maximum Rock n Roll) the first edition of Book Your Own Fuckin' Life, a directory (organized by region) of bands, distributors, venues, houses where "touring bands or traveling punks could sleep and sometimes eat for free," etc.--what Thompson describes as a "Yellow Pages of sorts" for "touring punk bands and punks in general."

Profane Existence Records, the collective's record label, was also founded in 1989. One of the label's first releases was "Extinction," the seminal New York City crust punk band Nausea's only full-length album, which John Griffin describes as "as important to the punks of the '90s as The Sex Pistols' Never Mind the Bollocks was to the punks of the late '70s." Another notable early release was Asbestosdeath's second 7", "Dejection"; Asbestosdeath's members went on to form the metal bands Sleep, High on Fire, and Om. Throughout the early and mid-1990s, Profane Existence released or distributed records by many other crust bands, including Doom, Misery, Fleas and Lice, Anarcrust, Counterblast, Dirt, and Hellbastard. Thompson writes that the label "became ground zero for [the crust] movement" and that the aesthetic of second-wave (i.e., beginning in the late 1980s) anarcho-punk "is currently exemplified by the bands released" on the label. More recently, the label has released music by bands like Behind Enemy Lines, MURDER DISCO X, Iskra, and The Cooters. In 2009 they hosted independent crust radio shows, Scairt Radio, Doomed Society, Organize and Arise and others. This finished in 2012, where the magazine became an online magazine.
