= Lookout Records =

American independent record label

- Founded: 1987; 39 years ago
- Founder: Larry Livermore, David Hayes
- Defunct: 2012; 14 years ago
- Status: Defunct
- Distributor: Mordam Records
- Genre: Punk rock; hardcore punk; pop-punk; melodic hardcore; ska punk
- Country of origin: U.S.
- Location: Laytonville, California
- Official website: lookoutrecords.com

Lookout Records (stylized as Lookout! Records) was an independent record label, initially based in Laytonville, California, and later in Berkeley, focusing on punk rock. Established in 1987, the label is best known for having released Operation Ivy’s only album, Energy, and Green Day's first two albums, 39/Smooth and Kerplunk.

Following the departure of co-founder Larry Livermore in 1997, the label departed from its "East Bay sound" and proved unable to match early success. In 2005 the label ran into financial difficulties after several high-profile artists rescinded the rights to their Lookout Records material. After a period of rapid contraction the label slowly expired, terminating operations and removing its music from online distribution channels early in 2012.

== History ==
=== Background ===
Cover of the Summer 1988 issue of Lookout! magazine, published in Laytonville, California, by Lawrence Livermore.

During the fall of 1984 Larry Livermore (née Larry Hayes), a resident of the small town of Laytonville, California, of countercultural proclivities, felt the urge to opine about the problems of his community and the world in a small-circulation periodical. Thus in October of that year was launched a circulation magazine called Lookout, the first issue of which was typed and photocopied with a "press run" of just 50 copies. Opposition emerged to the controversial local topics upon which Livermore opined and so he turned to the theme punk rock, a form of music he had followed in the late 1970s.

Livermore began to reacquaint himself with the ongoing punk music scene by listening to the Maximum Rocknroll (MRR) radio show, broadcast weekly from Berkeley and featuring prominent scenester and future fanzine publisher Tim Yohannan and his cohorts. Livermore also decided to start a band, drafting a 12-year-old neighbor to play drums — given the punk rock name "Tré Cool" by Livermore. Cool would later gain fame as the drummer of Green Day.

After a few ill-attended shows in 1985 Livermore took his band, The Lookouts, into a local recording studio to record their songs, with a 26-song demo tape resulting. He also began living part-time in the San Francisco Bay Area, splitting his time between the city and his home in the mountains of Mendocino County.

The Lookouts began playing out more in San Francisco and Berkeley and began to develop a fan following and to make the acquaintance of other local bands, including a melodically friendly group called The Mr. T Experience. A vibrant local scene began to form, based around the Gilman Street Project, an all-ages venue inspired, bankrolled, and coordinated by the popular Maximum Rocknroll, launched the night of December 31, 1986.

Early in 1987, Livermore decided that it was time for The Lookouts to release a record. Livermore chose to take the Do It Yourself route to create such an album, self-releasing the one-off LP under "Lookout Records." At the same time, the new bands emerging around the vibrant 924 Gilman Street venue, including Operation Ivy, Crimpshrine, Sewer Trout, Isocracy, and others were documented for the first time by local scenester David Hayes on a 17-song double 7-inch compilation entitled Turn It Around, released through Mordam Distribution on the Maximum Rocknroll Records label. The duo would soon join forces as co-founders of a permanent label.

=== Establishment ===
Both Lawrence Livermore (née Larry Hayes) and David Hayes (not related) were deeply inspired by the energetic East Bay punk rock scene and sought to further document its leading bands. David Hayes initially wanted to start a new label of his own for the purpose, to be known as Sprocket Records, with a view to a first release for the band Corrupted Morals. Livermore, a columnist for Maximum Rocknroll (MRR) who knew Hayes as a so-called "shitworker" for the publication, convinced the latter that a partnership was in order to advance their common goal. As Livermore's release had an independently controlled label name, Lookout Records, while Hayes's debut release borrowed the well-known MRR moniker, the former name was decided upon as the label name for the releases of the duo moving forward.

According to Livermore, the name "Lookout" was chosen for his magazine and band and thus the label from whence it sprung was selected in reference to the United States Forest Service fire watch tower on Iron Peak, the highest point in Livermore's rural Mendocino County neighborhood. The company's iconic "beady eyes" logo was the early creation of David Hayes, who also handled much of the artwork for the label's early sleeves and LP jackets.

With Hayes's Corrupted Morals project moving forward as LK-02, a 7-inch EP entitled Chet, Livermore and Hayes jointly worked to bring about a third release later in 1987. This would be yet another 7-inch EP, a record by raw-edged ska-punkers Operation Ivy called Hectic. This third release sold through its first pressing of 1,000 copies within a month.

In an effort to make a splash, four 7-inch vinyl records were released simultaneously, including also releases by popular 924 Gilman bands Crimpshrine (LK-04) and Isocracy (LK-05). This initial barrage of new releases went far in cementing Lookout's place as a cutting edge local label for the Berkeley punk scene.

The "Gilman bands" began to form friendships amongst themselves and to play out together at other venues on the road. One important contact was made in the person of 14-year-old Christopher "Chris" Appelgren, a resident of the small town of Garberville, California who worked as a volunteer at community radio station KMUD and who had learned of The Lookouts and the burgeoning East Bay punk rock scene through the pages of Lookout magazine, which was distributed in the area. Appelgren attended a show held at Humboldt State University in Arcata, California played by Lookout Records bands Operation Ivy, Crimpshrine, Isocracy, and The Lookouts and was wowed by what he saw, meeting Livermore for the first time and making the acquaintance of Tim "Lint" Armstrong of Op Ivy — later a leading member of Rancid. Before long Appelgren would be traveling to Livermore's Laytonville home to help with the stuffing of 7-inch vinyl into sleeves and packaging records for mailorder, becoming the label's first paid employee.

=== Departure of David Hayes ===
Livermore and Hayes began to become estranged from one another, and the label's projects began to be bifurcated between the two principals — "Larry's bands" and "David's bands," with the eclectic Hayes next turning to releases by post punk band Plaid Retina and country punks Sewer Trout. In addition to differences in musical taste which became more apparent over time, the pair were temperamentally ill-suited, with Hayes understated and reserved and Livermore boisterous and gregarious.

In addition, Hayes and Livermore differed greatly with respect to commercial motivation. In a 2015 memoir, Livermore recalled that

Even when it came to music we both liked, we found things to disagree about. [David Hayes] didn't want to hear me speculate about bands becoming popular even on an underground — let alone a mainstream — level. It almost felt as if he thought it was our job to stop that from happening, or at least delay it as much as possible... This confused me. I saw no logical reason why some of our bands shouldn't sell hundreds of thousands, even millions of records. I was convinced, after all, that they were just as good as, if not better than, most bands who did. But the moment I said anything like that, i risked incurring the wrath of MRR, 'the punks,' and, most of all, my partner.

Although the winds of change had begun to blow even in 1988, David Hayes would remain very active with Lookout through the summer of 1989, albeit with dissatisfaction regarding the label's direction growing, and his expressed desires of departure becoming more frequent. Hayes had gradually come to find working with Livermore to be insufferable and sought peace and artistic freedom through formation of his own record label.

Believing that Hayes's participation in the Lookout project as bookkeeper and skilled mitigator of the demands of demanding bands was essential, the 16-year old Appelgren clearly not being ready for the role, Livermore tried a last-ditch effort to retain Hayes with the label, offering to take over all mundane operational tasks while leaving Hayes with "half the profits" as financial coordinator and public face of the organization. The anti-commercial Hayes flatly rejected this proposal with the declaration that "there's too much golden light around Lookout right now," adding that work on his label of love had come to feel "too much like a job."

With a quiet determination, Hayes declared that his departure would take effect on January 1, 1990, adding "I don't want anything more to do with Lookout, and I don't want anything more from Lookout." The speechless Livermore was left with full ownership and control of the label on the very eve of its commercial success. David Hayes would go on to start his own label, Very Small Records, releasing dozens of records over the coming decade that ran the gamut of punk styles, maintaining fidelity to his artistic and ethical vision — while the label that he exited would go on to become a multimillion-dollar commercial enterprise.

=== Punk rock rising (1989–1993) ===
Many different punk rock bands, such as Green Day, were signed to Lookout in this time. Green Day released their debut EP, 1,000 Hours, in 1989. Green Day also released 39/Smooth (1990), Slappy (1990), Sweet Children (1990), and, with their new drummer, Kerplunk! (1992). After the breakup of Operation Ivy, some of the members formed Rancid. They released their debut EP, Rancid, in 1992 with Lookout Records. Screeching Weasel released their third and fifth to seventh albums, My Brain Hurts (1991), Wiggle (1993), Anthem for a New Tomorrow (1993), and How to Make Enemies and Irritate People (1994). Many other Bay area punk bands were getting signed by Lookout Records, giving them a start to a career.

=== "Golden years" (1993–1997) ===
Lookout became famous for releasing albums that featured a very distinctive "Ramonescore" pop punk sound including bands such as Screeching Weasel, The Mr T Experience, The Queers, Crimpshrine, Green Day, Sweet Baby, Squirtgun, The Wanna-Bes and others.

In the spring of 1994 Lookout principal Larry Livermore made a very public break with Tim Yohannan and his Maximum Rocknroll, for which Livermore had written since 1987. With punk exploding in popularity and various tangential musical forms attaching themselves to the movement and swamping MRR with promotional material, a tightening of musical focus was demanded by Yohannan — a move which led to the launch of the more eclectic rival publication Punk Planet. Livermore rebelled at the new line, charging that MRR had increasingly become "a lifestyle journal for retro-punks" who "think if they dress up in the same clothes they wore 15 years ago, if they drink the same beer and play the same guitar riffs, that somehow it'll be the glory days of punk all over again." Despite Yohannan's radical politics, Maximum had been revealed to be "simply another business," Livermore provocatively declared.

In 1995, with the help of Green Day's "1,039/Smoothed Out Slappy Hours" and "Kerplunk", Lookout Records made $10 million in sales.

Co-founder Larry Livermore left the label in 1997.

=== Under new management (1998–2004) ===
After Livermore's departure, Chris Appelgren took over as the label's president while his wife Molly Neuman became vice president and label employee Cathy Bauer took over as general manager. Screeching Weasel resigned with the label in 1998 for their album Emo. As part of an agreement, Lookout also purchased Ben Weasel's label Panic Button Records and would release albums from Panic Button acts including The Eyeliners, Enemy You and The Lillingtons. The move would be a major financial loss that would effect the label's royalty payouts in the following years. The label also switched its long time distribution affiliation with Mordam to RED Distribution.

In 1998, the label signed Palo Alto-based band The Donnas and would release 3 albums from the band between 1998 and 2001 as well as reissue their debut album. With decent sales and heavy coverage of the band from mainstream media outlets, The Donnas would depart for Atlantic Records in 2002. Other veteran acts such as the Queers, Pansy Division and Avail would depart in the early 2000s citing poor promotion and the label's increasing attention and spending on new acts.

By 2002, Lookout began to shift focus from its East Bay pop punk roots to a more diverse sound by releasing albums from bands such as Pretty Girls Make Graves, Ted Leo and the Pharmacists, the Oranges Band and Neuman's own band Bratmobile. The shift in direction and new releases from veteran acts like the Smugglers and the Mr. T Experience could not offset declining album sales and financial mismanagement including unprofitable showcases at the Warped Tour and CMJ. By 2004, the label had closed its retail store on University Avenue in Berkeley.

=== Demise (2005–2012) ===
On August 1, 2005, Green Day followed Avail, Blatz, Filth, Operation Ivy, Screeching Weasel, Riverdales, Lillingtons and Enemy You in announcing they had rescinded the master rights for their Lookout Records material. They cited continuing breach of contract regarding unpaid royalties. This led to the label laying off six of nine staff members. Appelgren told Punknews.org that the label would carry on in a scaled back form. Lookout Records turned 20 years old in 2008.

In December 2009, the company entered a major financial reconstruction period.

The label officially closed in January 2012. The label returned any remaining inventory, masters and artwork to the bands. Appelgren said he hoped bands would "... revisit their Lookout releases, with interesting and cool results."

== Artists ==
List of bands Lookout Records released at least one EP or full-length for:

- Alkaline Trio
- American Steel
- Ann Beretta
- Auntie Christ
- Avail
- The Avengers
- The Basicks
- Big Rig
- Bis
- Black Cat Music
- Black Fork
- Blatz
- The Bomb Bassets
- Boris the Sprinkler
- Born Against
- Bratmobile
- Brent's T.V.
- Citizen Fish
- Cleveland Bound Death Sentence
- Common Rider
- Communiqué
- Corrupted Morals
- The Cost
- Couch of Eureka
- The Criminals
- Crimpshrine
- Cringer
- The Crumbs
- Cub
- The Cuts
- The Donnas
- The Dollyrots
- Downfall
- Dr. Frank
- The Enemies
- Enemy You
- Engine Down
- Even in Blackouts
- Evening
- Eyeball
- The Eyeliners
- Fifteen
- Filth
- The Frumpies
- Fuel
- Fun Bug
- Furious George
- The Gaza Strippers
- Gene Defcon
- The Go-Nuts
- Go Sailor
- Green Day
- The Groovie Ghoulies
- The Hi-Fives
- Hockey Night
- The Invalids
- Isocracy
- Jack Acid
- The Jackie Papers
- The Jimmies
- Judy and the Loadies
- Juke
- Kamala and the Karnivores
- The Lashes
- The Lillingtons
- The Lookouts
- Mary Timony
- Monsula
- The Mopes
- Moral Crux
- The Mr. T Experience
- The Ne'er Do Wells
- Neurosis
- Nuisance
- One Time Angels
- Operation Ivy
- The Oranges Band
- The Outrights
- Pansy Division
- Parasites
- The Pattern
- The PeeChees
- The Phantom Surfers
- Pinhead Gunpowder
- Pitch Black
- Plaid Retina
- The Potatomen
- Pot Valiant
- Pretty Girls Make Graves
- The Queers
- Rancid
- Raooul
- The Reputation
- Rice
- Riverdales
- Samiam
- Scherzo
- Screeching Weasel
- Servotron
- Sewer Trout
- The Shangri-Lows
- The Shotdowns
- The Skinflutes
- Skinned Teen
- Sludgeworth
- Small Brown Bike
- The Smugglers
- Spitboy
- The Splash Four
- Squirtgun
- Stikky
- Surrogate Brains
- Sweet Baby
- Swollen Boss Toad
- Ted Leo and the Pharmacists
- Tilt
- Toilet Böys
- The Tourettes
- Towards an End
- Troubled Hubble
- Twenty-Nineteen
- Uranium 9-Volt
- The Vagrants
- The Vindictives
- The Wanna-Bes
- Washdown
- Wat Tyler
- Worst Case Scenario
- The Wynona Riders
- Yeastie Girlz
- Yesterday's Kids
- (Young) Pioneers
- The Zero Boys

== See also ==
- List of record labels
- Mordam Records
