= The Debt of the Dead =

Studio album by Ghost Mice
- Released: 2004
- Genre: Folk punk
- Length: 28:32
- Label: Plan-It-X Records

Ghost Mice chronology
Ghost Mice (2002)	The Debt of the Dead (2004)	Europe (2006)

The Debt of the Dead is an album by the Bloomington, Indiana, folk punk duo Ghost Mice.

== Track listing ==
No.	Title	Length
1.	"Figure 8"	1:33
2.	"Fire Fighter"	2:20
3.	"Lightning Bolt"	2:23
4.	"Hang On Kids"	2:28
5.	"The Road Goes On Forever"	1:30
6.	"Up the Punks"	2:06
7.	"1,000,000/Hour"	1:48
8.	"Endure"	1:01
9.	"The Pines"	1:48
10.	"Alas Babylon"	3:21
11.	"Cemeteries"	2:52
12.	"Undone"	2:46
13.	"There Is a Light (Smiths cover)"	2:36

Since the release of the album, it has been released by Chris Clavin on Bandcamp.com for free.
