= Anti-Creative Records =

American independent record label

- Founded: 2004
- Founder: Jared Dobias (a.k.a "jer")
- Genre: Acoustic, folk punk, punk, Indie
- Country of origin: U.S.
- Location: California
- Official website: www.anti-creative.com

Anti-Creative Records was an independent record label in southern California. The label's releases consist primarily of folk-punk and punk bands from across the United States. The label was founded in November 2004.

The label has released material from such notable bands as Defiance, Ohio and Ghost Mice.

== Business practices ==
Anti-Creative follows the DIY (do-it-yourself) punk ethic. The label likes to expand on this concept by saying they also consider themselves a "do-it-together" independent record label, stressing the importance of community and cooperation (as opposed to competition).

To help promote cooperation and collectivism, the label works closely with other labels with similar ideology as opposed to competing with them. In this way, they support small labels and encourage others to do so as well. The label is also intent on keeping music cheap and affordable ($5.00 USD or less for typical releases).

== List of Bands ==
- Captain Chaos
- Defiance, Ohio
- Ghost Mice
- imadethismistake
- The Max Levine Ensemble
- One Reason
- Operation: Cliff Clavin
- Pretty Hot
- Saw Wheel

== Discography ==
- ACR001 - One Reason/Defiance Ohio - Split 7" - Released November 15, 2004
- ACR002 - Pretty Hot/Ghost Mice - Split CD - Released June 1, 2005
- ACR003 - Captain Chaos - The Fool CD - Released March 12, 2007
- ACR004 - imadethismistake - It's Okay 12" - Released August 1, 2008
- ACR005 - Saw Wheel 7" - Released January 20, 2010

Anti-Creative Records also participated in the community-release of the Operation: Cliff Clavin/The Max Levine Ensemble split 7" that was released in 2005. The label has since sold out of their copies (other labels may still have available copies). For a number of years, the label indicated they would be releasing an album by Rio de la Muerte, which was later cancelled.

== See also ==
- DIY ethic
- Folk punk
- Indie music
- List of record labels
- Plan-It-X Records
- Punk rock
