= Soophie Nun Squad =

- Origin: Little Rock, AR
- Genres: punk Funk; Pizza Theatre
- Years active: 1992–2007
- Labels: Harlan Records; Plan-it-X; Narshardaa records Phyte Records
- Members: Mike Lierly; Mark Lierly; Eli Monster; Nate Powell; Dustin Clark; Mikael Wood; Tim Scott; Maralie Armstrong; Anna Newell; Kristine Barrett; Michael Motley
- Past members: Alan Short

Soophie Nun Squad (often shortened by fans to simply Soophie or abbreviated SNS) is a DIY punk rock band from North Little Rock, Arkansas known for their jubilant stage performances which typically include costumes, puppet shows, and a large amount of crowd participation. The number of members varies from 6 to 11, but always includes a bass guitar player, a drummer, a guitarist and at least three lead singers. They are also known for bizarre song structures and topics, such as "Donkey Call" in which the singers proclaim they are giving up automobiles in favor of riding donkeys and encourage audience members to do the same and give their "Donkey Call" (or "Esel Schrei"), or loudly make the sound of a donkey.

== Biography ==
Soophie Nun Squad formed in the fall of 1992 as a four-piece called The Schwa Sound, but renamed themselves by February 1993 at news that friends Chip King (later of The Body) and Mark Lowe (later of Il Libretina) had started a band entitled "Schwa". Soophie Nun Squad's first show was April 24, 1993 on the back lawn of the Arkansas Governor's Mansion, at the request of Governor Jim Guy Tucker's daughter Anna. Initially, Soophie Nun Squad drew from such diverse musical influences as Moss Icon, Primus, Chino Horde, Anthrax, The Four Tops, Beastie Boys, and Heavenly. As new members joined the fray through the years, Soophie Nun Squad became a sonic melting pot, primarily influenced by Big Boys, Salt N Pepa, R. Kelly, Public Enemy, Laurie Anderson, Rites of Spring, David Bowie, and 69 Boyz, and became increasingly more focused on the relationship between their songs and performative narratives tying disparate movements into a larger body of music (reaching its zenith in "The Scab Fairy", a seven-part rock opera on 2003's "Passion Slays the Dragon").

Soophie Nun Squad has been inactive since performing on June 21, 2006, in Braunschweig, Germany. Some material and concepts for newer SNS songs found outlets in WAIT (consisting of Nate Powell, with contributions by Mark, Maralie, and Eli), Divorce Chord (Nate Powell, Mike Lierly, and Patrice Poor), Humanola (Eli Monster), and HoneyBeast (Maralie Armstrong). The band was scheduled to play their final concerts at a show for Towncraft (film) on May 18, 2007, and the following night in North Little Rock, AR, until Mark Lierly broke his wrists and the shows were cancelled.

Soophie Nun Squad's tours are as follows:

- July 1997 – eastern U.S. tour
- June/July 1998 – eastern/southern U.S. tour
- June 1999 – midwestern U.S. mini-tour (with Bread and Circuits)
- July 1999 – western U.S. tour
- June/July 2000 – eastern U.S. tour (with The Body)
- July/August 2001 – U.S. tour
- April 2002 – European tour
- May 2003 – Midwestern U.S. tour (with Tom Sweet in lieu of Tem Eyos Ki)
- September/October 2003 – European tour (with Ghost Mice)
- August 2004 – eastern U.S. tour (with Defiance, Ohio)
- July 2005 – southern U.S. tour (on Plan-It-X tour with Ghost Mice, Defiance, Ohio, This Bike is a Pipe Bomb, Erin Tobey, The Max Levine Ensemble, Madeline, The Door-Keys, One Reason, and Rosa)
- May 2006 – midwestern U.S. mini-tour (with Mt. Gigantic)
- May/June 2006 – European tour

Soophie Nun Squad's members were scattered across the United States but remain tied to the Little Rock punk scene. In 2015, four members reside in California; one lives in Bloomington, Indiana; two live in Providence, Rhode Island; one lives in New York City; while four remain in Little Rock, Arkansas. Band members have also lived in and participated in the scenes of Kansas City MO, Philadelphia PA, New York NY, and Savannah GA.

Due to the intimacy of Soophie Nun Squad performances, critics and historians generally agree that the band could never be as successful in a large venue. Despite this, the band has gained a huge international cult following, due in part to extensive touring.

Soophie (1993–2010), a Lhasa Apso owned by the drummer and one singer's family, is named after the band.

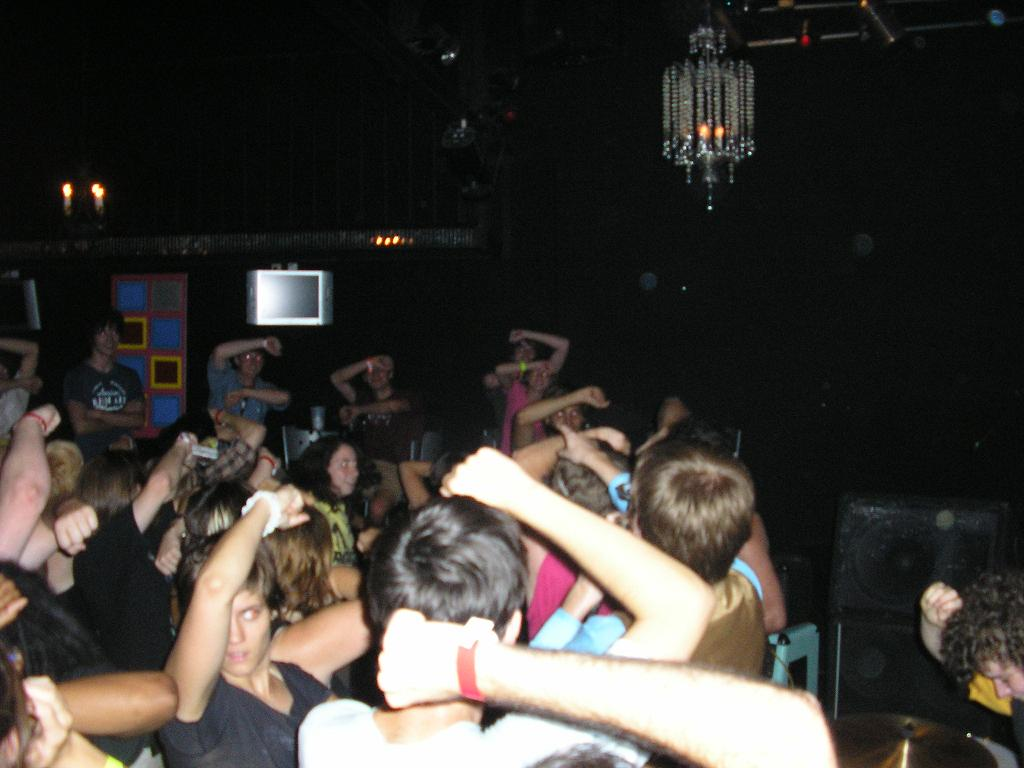
A member of Soophie ridicules an audience member for not "doing the cinderblock", while other audience members (who are "doing the cinderblock") look on.

== Soophie Nun Squad's chronological lineup ==
- Mike Lierly (Universe, Divorce Chord, Tem Eyos Ki, Boomfancy, Gioteens, Hug) — voice, puppets (1993–2007), guitar (1992–93)
- Mark Lierly (Sugar and the Raw, The Evelyns, Pallbearer (band), Winter Furs, Serenity Scheme) — drums (1992–2007)
- Eli Monster (Tem Eyos Ki, Gioteens, Humanbeast, Global Credit Squeeze, K, Truckenstein-9, Humanola, Hug, Paper, Scissors, Rock!) — bass (1992–2007)
- Nate Powell (Universe, Divorce Chord, WAIT, Boomfancy, Gioteens, Featherweight) — voice, puppets (1992–2007)
- Dustin Clark (The Insides, Shake Ray Turbine, William Martyr 17, Lazy Fair, The Earthworms, Train Accompaniment, Revolver Red) — guitar, voice (1993–2007)
- Mikael Wood (Rainy Day Regatta, K) — voice, keyboard, guitar, puppets (1994–2007)
- Tim Scott (Orange Core, Gioteens, Lil' Sluggers, Lord Papula, Alphaprobe, Paper, Scissors, Rock!) — turntables, electronics, voice, keyboard, trombone, puppets (1996–2007)
- Maralie Armstrong (Tem Eyos Ki, Humanbeast, Truckenstein-9, honeybeast, Paper,Scissors,Rock!) — voice, keyboard, accordion, whistles, puppets, costumes, props (1998–2007)
- Asa Newell (Boomfancy, Train Accompaniment, Rat Fink a-Bu-Bu, Uptown Prophets) — guitar, puppets (2000–2007)
- Alan Short (Deadbird, Zucura, Seahag, Vulturebait, Them of Delphi, Entrance, Hug) — buckets, puppets (2000–2003)
- Michael Motley (Sugar and the Raw, Jalopy Kinfolk, Big Boots) — percussion, keyboard (2001–2007)
- Kristine Barrett (Lily Maude Horseman) — voice, keyboard, puppets (2004–2007)
- Electric Dukes — voice, beats, electricity (2004–forever)

== Auxiliary members ==
- Nathan Wilson — interpretive martial arts performance, skit writer, roadie (1993–2007)
- Emil Heiple — skit writer, roadie (1998–2001)
- Lee Buford (The Body, Lorna Doom, Everyone Asked About You, Class of Eighty Four, Divine Hook-Up) — tour drums (2000)
- Justin Collins (Honky, Go Fast, Sugar and the Raw) — percussion (2001–2002)
- Mary Chamberlin (Tree of Knowledge Book Distro) — roadie (2002–2005)

== Discography ==
- May 1994 — "We Ate Slayer" demo (Food Chain)
- August 1994 — "We Rule the World" demo (Food Chain)
- March 1995 — "vs. the USA" 7" (Food Chain)
- May 1995 — 5 songs, "The Dogtown Chronicles" comp tape (Food Chain)
- May 1995 — live song, Anna Newell's VHS compilation
- August 1995 — "Takes Manhattan" demo (Food Chain)
- June 1996 — 1 song, "We've Lost Beauty" comp LP (File 13)
- April 1997 — "Dino" 7" (Harlan Records—formerly Food Chain)
- March 1998 — "Don't Let Them Take You Alive" CD (Harlan)
- August 1998 — 1 song, "Heartbreakers and Rumpshakers" comp 7" (Harlan)
- January 2000 — "The Devil, The Metal, The Big Booty Beats" LP/CD (Phyte/Harlan/Plan-it-X)
- January 2000 — 1 song, "A Compilation For Heroes" comp CD (Streetcar Music)
- April 2000 — 1 song, "Defeated Food Not Bombs Benefit" comp CD (Defeated)
- July 2001 — 1 song, "Listen To What I'm Made Of" comp 2xCD (File 13)
- July 2001 — 1 song, Phyte/Magic Bullet Records sampler CD (Phyte/Magic Bullet)
- October 2001 — 1 song on "Ride" BMX VHS zine (Ride)
- April 2003 — split LP/CD with Abe Froman (Harlan/Plan It X Records)
- September 2003 — "Passion Slays the Dragon" LP/CD (Harlan/Plan-it-X/Narshardaa)
- November 2004 — 3 songs, "Rootbeer and Molotovs" comp CD (Ten Fingers Collective)
- June 2005 — 1 live song, "Plan-it-X Fest 2004" comp DVD (Plan-it-X)
- August 2005 — 1 song, Localist Magazine comp CD (Localist)
- December 2005 — 1 song, "If It Ain't Cheap, It Ain't Punk" comp CD (Plan-it-X)
- March 2006 — 1 song, "All The Days Are Numbered So" comp CD/zine (Harlan)
- May 2007 — "Towncraft" DVD/2xCD documentary (Matson Films)
