= Chris Clavin =

American musician (born 1973)

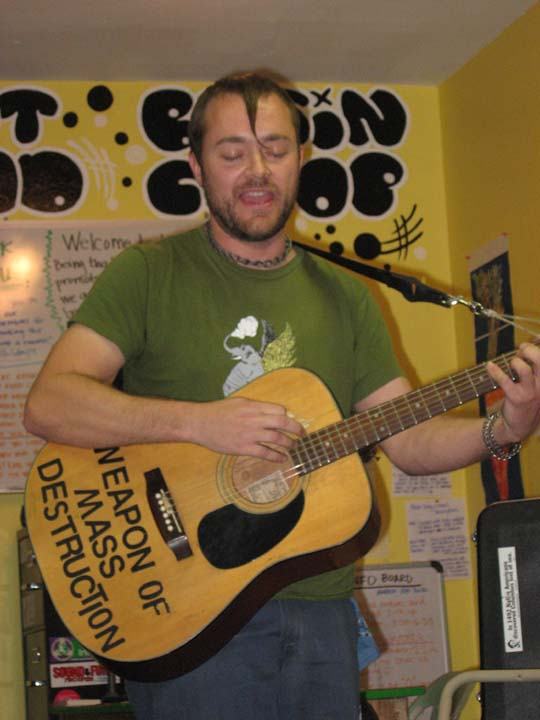
- Clavin performing in 2007

Background information
- Born: August 23, 1973 (age 53)
- Origin: Indiana, United States
- Genres: Punk rock; folk punk; pop punk
- Occupations: Singer; songwriter
- Years active: 1994-2017
- Label: Plan-It-X

Chris Clavin is an American musician and record label owner from Indiana, United States, with a strict DIY (do-it-yourself) punk ethic. He has been involved in numerous punk bands and ran Plan-It-X Records, a label founded in 1994.

Clavin has been a part of many (primarily pop punk and folk punk) bands, including bands that have toured the world and been influential in the DIY punk scene.

== Bands ==
=== Ghost Mice ===
Ghost Mice
- Origin: Bloomington, Indiana, United States
- Genre: Folk punk
- Years active: 2002–2017
- Labels: Plan-It-X Records, No Idea Records, Hill Billy Stew Records, Anti-Creative Records, Friends and Relatives Records, Valiant Death Records, Discount Horse Records
- Members: Chris Clavin; Hannah Jones

In 2002, Clavin formed the two-piece folk punk band Ghost Mice with Hannah Jones. It was an American band based in Bloomington, Indiana, United States. Both members had been in a handful of pop-punk bands together: namely Disarm, The Devil is Electric and Operation: Cliff Clavin. They decided to "turn to the folk side" in the hopes that they could tour more easily and play almost anywhere, and to this end Hannah changed from playing bass to violin. The following is a quote from Ghost Mice:

We play 100% acoustic. We never use amps or mics (except at Plan-It-X Fest and on and once in Austin, Texas). We have been playing in bands together for about 7 years. We started Ghost Mice in 2002 because we were tired of being restricted. We were tired of having to travel in big vans and depend on amps, PA systems and electricity. With Ghost Mice we can travel very light and we need nothing to play. We often play in back yards or on the street corner in front of the venue. We have toured the United States many times and we toured Europe (Germany, the Netherlands, Denmark, Austria, France, Spain, Belgium, England, Wales, Scotland, and Ireland) by foot. We hitch-hiked and took trains to all of our shows. It was fun and very liberating. We sing a mix of personal and political lyrics, we are anarchist, we are dedicated to the DIY ethic and the struggle to make the world a better place. We play music and travel for fun and to meet new people. Music is our lives. We love travel. We are nice and a little shy.

Dark Times was released initially in 2017 and re-released on the internet in June 2018.

=== List of bands ===
Below is a partial list of the bands Clavin has played in:

- Last August
- Drowners
- The Ted Dancin' Machine
- Operation: Cliff Clavin
- Disarm
- Pink Ass Flowers (P.A.F.)
- The Trolls
- The Coug
- The Ground-Ups
- I Like Japanese Hardcore
- The Sissies
- Ghost Mice
- The Devil is Electric
- Captain Chaos
- Helter Skeletor
- The Jammy Dodgers
- Imperial Can
- Long Duck Dong
- By Blood
- Inky Skulls
- Tooth Soup

== Solo musical projects ==
Clavin started working on solo recordings in the fall of 2004 when he wrote a song and recorded it in the same day to give to someone as a gift. He tried to write and record one song a day. He only made it 8 days. Those 8 songs along with 7 others are on the first album, "May All Liars Burn in Hell". The idea behind his solo projects is to write songs without thinking about them, to be pure in writing and hold nothing back. Occasionally Clavin utilized his friends "Colorblind" Joe, McKayla or others for help. Primarily playing with acoustic guitar or ukulele, he has toured the US West Coast, Midwest, and Europe multiple times.

=== As Captain Chaos ===
Captain Chaos
- Origin: Bloomington, IN, United States
- Genre: Folk punk
- Years active: 2004–2008
- Labels: Plan-It-X; Anti-Creative; Fall of the West; The Scientist and The Duke; Sweet Now; Big Magic; Crafty; Valiant Death
- Members: Chris Johnston ("Chris Clavin") - acoustic guitar, vocals and sometimes Colorblind Joe - ukulele, backing vocals McKayla - backing vocals Matty pop chart - piano

When Clavin first started releasing solo songs, he did not want his typical moniker attached to them. Spoonboy (of The Max Levine Ensemble) gave him the name Captain Chaos. Though Clavin did not like the name, it stuck. He released six full-length albums, one split, and appeared on a handful of compilations and other small projects as Captain Chaos before using his real name on his solo work (see further below).

==== Captain Chaos discography ====
===== Early works =====
Year	Title	Label	Format
2004	Captain Chaos	Spoonboy's Tape Label	Cassette
2004	Tour CD-R	Self-Released/Chaos Records	CD-R

===== Full-length albums =====
Year	Title	Label	Format
2006	May All Liars Burn In Hell (a.k.a. Self-Titled)	The Scientist and the Duke Records	CD, Digital
2006	This is Cake	Crafty Records	CD
2006	Bloomington, Vol. 1	Big Magic Records	CD
2006	Ireland	Valiant Death Records	CD-R
2007	The Fool	Anti-Creative Records	CD
2007	For The Devil	Fall of the West Records	CD
2007	Your Bright Eyes Are Gonna Kill Me For Sure	Crafty Records	CD-R
2008	Nice and Friendly/Captain Chaos Split - Have Fun/Die Hard	Sweet No Records	CD

===== Box set =====
All six of the full-length albums (and a bonus CDR of cover songs) were available in a hand-crafted wooden box set with hand-made art. These boxes were made by Dan Treiber of Crafty Records. Fifty-one of them were made. The first 25 were made out of recycled 99-year-old barn wood. The second 26 were made out of recycled 1960 Canadian crate wood. The box set became officially available as of April 5, 2007. It is now out of print.

===== Compilations =====
Year	Title	Label	Format
2005	Bella's Birthday CD (free!)	Plan-It-X Records	CD, Digital
2006	Live At Bandit H.Q.	DIY Bandits	CD-R
2006	Night of the Living Devilock: A DIY Tribute to the Misfits	Playground's Greatest Records/Pop Monster! Records	CD-R
2006	The Three Dollar Gallon	Crafty Records	CD
2007	Ponies in a Stable	Don't Stop Believin' Records	CD
2008	Thanks For The Floor	Crafty Records	CD

=== As Chris Clavin ===
In 2008, Clavin decided to stop releasing songs as Captain Chaos, and instead use his traditional moniker. He began to tour solo again on a small scale, and has released one album so far.

==== Chris Clavin discography ====
===== Full-length albums =====
Year	Title	Label	Format
2008	The Roads Don't Lead Home. The Roads Lead Everywhere	Crafty Records	12" vinyl LP
2009	Secrets (Chris Clavin / Sara Cilantro Split)	Plan-It-X Records	Cassette
2009	Chris Clavin / Madeline Ava Split	Plan-It-X Records	Cassette
2010	Chris Clavin / Andrew Lips Split	Plan-It-X Records	Cassette
2011	Waxahachee / Chris Clavin Split	Plan-It-X Records	Cassette, Digital
2011	Chris Clavin / Kyle Hall Split	Plan-It-X Records	Cassette, Digital

=== Record labels ===
Clavin's solo projects have appeared on the following record labels (this list excludes compilations and smaller projects)

- Anti-Creative Records
- Big Magic Records
- Boom Boom Tapes
- Crafty Records
- Fall of the West Records
- Plan-It-X Records
- The Scientist and the Duke Records
- Sweet Now Records
- Valiant Death Records
- Rock-it Records

== Allegations ==
In 2017, a series of Facebook posts were published, followed by the creation of a public Google Doc, which aggregated accounts from unnamed individuals alleging inappropriate conduct by Clavin. The accounts were collected through an email address that did not require or request any personal identification from the writers to vet or confirm the accounts. Clavin did not admit or respond specifically to any of these claims, but instead simply announced his departure from the punk scene, stating, among other things: "I no longer play in any bands. I no longer run a record label or publishing company. I will settle all affairs and orders of course, and pay all outstanding debts and invoices."

Several of the dozens of small artists Clavin collaborated with or published music for over the years - Kimya Dawson, AJJ, Waxahatchee, Spoonboy and Ramshackle Glory - publicly condemned his alleged actions, requested that Plan-It-X Records cease distributing their products, and stated they would remove Clavin's work from future printings of these split records, although it does not appear any further physical printings of these records were produced.

Clavin's bandmate in Ghost Mice, Hannah O'Connor, posted the following on Facebook, quoted by PunkNews in response to the anonymous accounts: "Since I have been Chris' friend for a long time, I know that he is being accused of things he has not done. I know there are a lot of false allegations, rumors, and lies spreading very fast about him."

== New music ==
Clavin continues as a songwriter and has released several albums under the moniker of Captain Chaos recently, including "Shawties," in 2019 and "Black Swan" in 2020.

== See also ==
- Lists of record labels
