= FOTW =

FOTW may refer to:

== Arts and media ==
- Fall of the West Records
- Fate of the World, a video game
- Flags of the World (website), an Internet-based vexillological resource
- Frost Over the World, an Al Jazeera programme
- Fly on the Wall, style of documentary filming

== Other uses ==
- Fall of the Wall, the end of the Berlin Wall
