= Buzz (Fifteen album) =

Studio album by Fifteen
- Released: 1994
- Recorded: Winter, 1994 at Smooth Papa's Greasy Groove House of Drive-Thru Audio
- Genre: Punk
- Length: 35:11
- Label: Grass, Plan It X
- Producer: Noah Rection, Fifteen

Fifteen chronology
Choice of a New Generation (1992)	Buzz (1994)	Extra Medium Kick Ball Star (17) (1995)

Professional ratings
Review scores
Source	Rating
AllMusic	2.5/5 stars

Buzz is the third studio album by California punk band Fifteen. The album was released on CD, LP, and cassette by the now-defunct label Grass Records, in 1994. It was re-released on CD by Grass Records on August 27, 1996, then re-released again on CD by Plan-It-X Records on November 14, 2006. It is considered by many, including Brendan Kelly of the Lawrence Arms, to be the band's best album.

== Track listing ==
1. "World Starvation" - 3:06
2. "Helter Smelter" - 2:49
3. "No Tion" - 2:41
4. "Situations" - 2:20
5. "I Keep On Tryin'" - 2:37
6. "Question" - 3:54
7. "Violation" - 3:19
8. "Fifteen" - 2:30
9. "Food Not Bombs" - 2:28
10. "Predisposition" - 3:54
11. "Abel's Song" - 1:41
12. "In Our World" - 4:07

== Personnel ==
- Jeff Ott – lead vocals, guitar
- Jack Curran – bass, backing vocals
- Chris Flanagan – drums, backing vocals
- Noah Rection – harmonica

Production

- Noah Rection – producer
- Merry Gregg – cover design
- Kim A. – cover art
