= Dylan Haskins =

Irish broadcaster

- Born: 20 June 1987 (age 39); Dublin, Ireland
- Education: Studied History of Art and Classical Civilisation at Trinity College Dublin (TCD)
- Employer: BBC Sounds
- Known for: Two Tube on RTÉ Two
- Awards: Peabody Award 2019
- Website: dylanhaskins.ie

Dylan Haskins (born 20 June 1987) is an Irish broadcaster, documentary maker and producer.

Haskins has been a proponent of the DIY ethic, and worked on several projects initiated as a teenager, including the establishment "non-alcohol spaces" in north Wicklow and Dublin.

Haskins has also been involved in broadcasting, podcasts, and independent music management. He was an unsuccessful Independent candidate in the 2011 Irish general election.

== Career ==
=== Music ===
Haskins ran gigs in his former home, The Hideaway House which became a "hub" for the DIY music scene in Dublin and his independent record label Hide Away Records. Hide Away Records' releases included the debut album of Irish band Heathers, whom Haskins also managed from 2007 to 2009.

=== Events ===
In May 2009, Haskins was a member of a group that founded Exchange Dublin, an arts centre in Temple Bar with the support of Project Arts Centre, where he sat on the board of directors. The Exchange, later run by volunteers, closed its doors in 2014.

Later in 2009, Haskins curated and directed the event 'Culture and the city: the debate' for Temple Bar Cultural Trust. It took the form of a masked debate about culture in Temple Bar's Meeting House Square. Also, that year, Haskins collaborated with a group of students from the National College of Art and Design to organise a week-long event in Project Arts Centre.

=== Broadcasting and podcasting ===
In December 2011, Haskins began presenting coverage of Other Voices for guardian.co.uk and covered the series in Derry in 2013 and 2014.

In 2013, Haskins launched the Soundings Podcast, a cultural podcast that he co-hosted with singer Lisa Hannigan. Throughout the first eleven podcasts, Haskins and Hannigan interviewed guests like Dermot O'Leary and Harry Shearer.

In 2015, Haskins wrote and produced a 'documentary on one' for RTÉ, "The Murderer, Me and My Family Tree" in which he researched his potential relatives, Lord Haskins and James Haskins, the last man hanged in Wicklow Gaol.

From 2019, Haskins was involved in the commissioning process for the BBC Sounds podcast, "Have You Heard George's Podcast" by George the Poet, which won the 2019 Peabody Award and was the first British Podcast to win a Peabody, and for the Second Captains and BBC Sounds production, "Where is George Gibney?".

=== Film ===
In 2008, Haskins directed a documentary called Roll Up Your Sleeves about DIY counterculture. DIY figures including Ian MacKaye of the band Fugazi, Ellen Lupton, and Dutch band The Ex took part in the documentary. The film was funded by a Broadcasting Commission of Ireland Sound & Vision Award. It premiered at the 2009 Stranger Than Fiction Festival in the IFI in Dublin. In January 2011, the film was made available free online.

=== Politics ===
In an interview with Jarlath Regan on The Irishman Abroad podcast, Haskins stated that, from a young age, he was frustrated at the lack of facilities available to young people in Ireland. He later petitioned for a skate park in his local area and attempted to turn a local disused building into a community centre. Haskins stated that he was increasingly frustrated with the process of trying to make changes through official channels and the lack of engagement of local politicians. Haskins was an Independent candidate for Dublin South-East in the 2011 general election. His campaign included appearances on BBC Newsnight, BBC World Service and Al Jazeera and articles in The Guardian and Le Monde. Haskins was eliminated on the fourth count with 1,383 first preference votes (3.96%). Haskins was entitled to a refund of €8,700 in election expenses which he donated to charity.
