= This Bike Is a Pipe Bomb =

Folk punk band from Pensacola, Florida

- Origin: Pensacola, Florida, United States
- Genres: Folk punk, cowpunk
- Years active: 1997-2011
- Labels: Plan It X Records, No Idea, Ghostmeat Records, Risk Records, Shake Records
- Members: Rymodee; Terry Johnson; Teddy "Ted" Helmick

This Bike Is a Pipe Bomb was a folk punk band from Pensacola, Florida, United States. Their first recording was released in 1997 on Ghostmeat Records. Their later releases have been on Plan It X Records and No Idea Records, but now appear on their own label Plan-It X South. This Bike Is a Pipe Bomb initially started as a new wave band, with folk singer David Dondero on drums. They quickly switched to playing country music, but their punk roots were evident enough in their music that they became one of the premiere bands at the forefront of the folk-punk genre. They did several US tours, including an Alaska tour 2003 played at Geekfest, and toured Europe.

On February 3, 2011, This Bike Is A Pipe Bomb announced that it was ending. Rymodee and Terry still write and play together in Zippers To Nowhere, based in Chattanooga.

Much of their music is politically oriented. This Bike Is a Pipe Bomb is staunchly pacifist and concerned with the Civil Rights Movement of the 1960s and racial equality in general.

== Band members ==
- Rymodee - guitar, vocals, harmonica
- Terry Johnson - bass, vocals
- Teddy "Ted" Helmick - drums, jokes, vocals
- Zine author Aaron Cometbus has been known to play drums for the band on occasion.
- Spot - fidola

== Discography ==
- S/T 7" Ghost Meat Records, 1997 Out Of Print
- Dance Party With... CD Plan-It-X Records, 1999
- Dance Party With... 10" Troy from Vancouver, 2004
- Of Chivalry and Romance in a Dumpster 10" Fab Records, 1999 Out Of Print
- Black Panther Party 7" Arkam Records, 2001
- This Bike Is a Pipe Bomb/The Devil Is Electric Split 7" Risk Records, 2001 Out Of Print
- Front Seat Solidarity LP Plan-It-X Records, 2002 Out Of Print (repressed on No Idea Records in 2007)
- Front Seat Solidarity CD Plan-It-X Records, 2002
- Songs Of Our Soil CD and zine (self-released), 2002
- This Bike Is a Pipe Bomb/Carrie Nations Split 7" Shake/Plan-It-X Records, 2004 Out Of Print
- Three Way Tie for a Fifth CD Plan-It-X Records, 2004
- Three Way Tie for a Fifth LP No Idea Records, 2005
- Convertible CD Plan-It-X Records, 2008
- Convertible LP No Idea Records, 2009
- Radon/This Bike Is a Pipe Bomb/Vaginasore Jr./King Friday Split Fast Crowd Records, 2008 (contributed the song "Bright One")

== Controversy over name ==
On March 2, 2006, at 5:30 am an Ohio University police officer spotted a bicycle attached to the Oasis restaurant bearing a promotional sticker for the band. The officer saw the words "This Bike Is a Pipe Bomb" and became concerned. The area was cordoned off, and part of the campus was closed for several hours. The bicycle was subsequently destroyed by the Athens bomb squad despite assurances from the bike's owner that it was just a sticker. The owner, a graduate student, was initially charged with inducing panic, a misdemeanor. However, the charges were dropped a few days later. Later the student was awarded money for the damages to his bicycle.

A similar incident occurred in 2001, when a police officer spotted and detained a woman at an Austin, Texas peace rally. Her bicycle was also labeled with the band's sticker. The woman was released after the band's existence was confirmed.

On March 14, 2006, Bellarmine Hall at Saint Joseph's University in Philadelphia, Pennsylvania, was evacuated because of another bicycle with the band's name painted on it. No charges were filed.

On February 16, 2009, Terminal C at Memphis International Airport was evacuated because of a bicycle with the band's sticker on it. A pilot notified police when he saw the bike, with the band's sticker on it, parked outside of the terminal. Police evacuated the terminal and sent in K9 units; however, no explosive materials were found. Police arrested the owner of the bike but let the owner go a few hours later because he had not committed a crime. After hearing about the incident, the band's lead singer urged fans to use caution when they applied the stickers.
