= Extra Medium Kick Ball Star (17) =

Studio album by Fifteen
- Released: 1995
- Recorded: February 23rd – April 20th 1995
- Genre: Punk
- Label: Rebel Alliance Records / Cool Guy Records / Sub City Records

Fifteen chronology
Buzz (1994)	Extra Medium Kick Ball Star (17) (1995)	Surprise! (1996)

Extra Medium Kick Ball Star (17) is the fourth album by California Punk band Fifteen. This album marked a change in theme from previous albums, with Ott addressing the abuse he grew up with in songs such as Run II, Grow Up and Emancipation Proclamation.

== Track list ==
1. Front
2. Chris' Song
3. Run II
4. The Deal
5. Grow Up
6. Emancipation Proclamation
7. Over and Over
8. Intelligence
9. Jesus
10. Rainbow Connection
11. Violation II
