= The Sissies =

American pop-punk band

- Origin: Bloomington, Indiana, U.S.
- Genres: Pop punk
- Years active: 1998–2002, 2004
- Labels: Plan-it-X Records, New Disorder Records

The Sissies were an American pop-punk band based in Bloomington, Indiana. Formed in 1998, the band released two albums before breaking up in 2002: 1999's Geography, released on Plan-it-X Records, and 2001's Look Back and Laugh on New Disorder Records. In 2004, Plan-it-X released a compilation album, Everything in the World, which included both albums and additional rarities and live material. That same year, the three members of the band reunited to do three songs at a single show honoring Plan-It-X Records' tenth anniversary.

Band members Ali Haimson and Jrd have since formed band What The Kids Want. Hannah Jones, who used to play in The Devil is Electric with Chris Clavin, joined Ghost Mice.

== Members ==
- Ali Haimson - guitar, vocals
- Hannah Jones - bass, vocals
- Jrd - drums

== Past members ==
- Chris Clavin - drums
