= Connie Dungs =

American punk rock band

The Connie Dungs
- Origin: Ashland, Kentucky
- Genres: Pop punk Rock
- Years active: 1994–2001; 2011; 2013; 2019
- Labels: Mutant Pop Records; Plan It X Records
- Members: Chris Griffith (percussion); Wayne Griffith (bass); John Spears (guitar)
- Past members: Brandon Tussey (vocals); Mike Webb (guitar); Rob Lowe (guitar); Dave Berger (guitar)

The Connie Dungs were an American punk rock band from Ashland, Kentucky, formed in 1994.

== Biography ==
The Connie Dungs described themselves as "a poppy snotty punk band similar in style to The Ramones and, later, Jawbreaker". They existed as an active band from 1994 to 2000, taking part in over 20 releases during that time. The Dungs gained some degree of prominence in the American underground punk scene based on sporadic concerts around the middle U.S., including Kentucky, Ohio, Tennessee, and West Virginia.

=== Beginnings ===
Brandon Tussey met Wayne Griffith at a record store where Wayne worked. They had a similar taste in music and Brandon eventually asked Wayne if he wanted to start a band. Wayne got his brother, Chris Griffith, to play drums, and coworker, John Spears, to play guitar. A few months into 1994, the Connie Dungs began performing at local shows in Eastern Kentucky. During this early period they recorded and released two cassette-tape demos (Songs for Swinging Lovers and Nice Guys Finish Last), which were sold exclusively at shows. Both Songs for Swinging Lovers and Nice Guys Finish Last were later collected on one album, Songs for Swinging Nice Guys, released in 1999 on Mutant Pop Records.

Their first official release was a split 7-inch with fellow local punk band Tugboat. These demos and early releases resulted in a 7-inch single with Chicago indie label Harmless Records. Missy and Johnny was selected in 1995 by Shredder Records as one of the top punk singles of the year and was included in volume three of their annual compilation, Shreds.

=== Underground Punk Success ===
After signing with Mutant Pop and releasing a series of singles and albums, more buzz came by way of positive coverage from numerous major underground punk publications, including Flipside, Punk Planet, The Probe, Jersey Beat, and maximumrocknroll. Two writers at maximumrocknroll were particularly enthusiastic about the group: George Tabb and Mykel Board. Board once wrote: "They're my new favorite band. In case you haven't heard, they've got the best punk vocalist since H.R.! ... I love you!". The band even made an appearance in the December 1996 issue of Guitar School magazine in the article "The Great Unknowns: The Best and the Brightest of Today's Unsung Punk Bands."

John Spears left the band in 1996, and was replaced by Rob Lowe. Zac Damon (of Zoinks!, Squirtgun and Screeching Weasel fame) provided back-up vocals for the second LP, Driving on Neptune. The third LP, Earthbound for the Holiday, featured back-up vocals from Mass Giorgini, the prominent pop punk producer who was a member of later incarnations of Screeching Weasel and a founding member of Squirtgun. Mass also had a hand in recording, mastering, or producing several Connie Dungs releases. Rob Lowe and the band parted ways in 1999 for unspecified reasons. Rob was replaced with Dave Berger of Spodie. The band recorded songs with Dave that would go on to appear on the Mutant Pop SRCD, titled "Turntable." He also played on the group's final album, Eternal Bad Luck Charm.

=== Break-up and later projects ===
The band played their last show August 19, 2000, at the Mutant Pop Festival in Warren, PA. This was the same day their 4th and final LP, Eternal Bad Luck Charm, was released.

Following the break-up, the three permanent members (Brandon, Chris, and Wayne) started a new band with a less pop-oriented direction, A Radio With Guts. Brandon also played some solo acoustic shows, including a gig with pop punk luminary Dr. Frank.

In 2007, Brandon restarted the band with an entirely different lineup and played a few local shows. In 2009, Tussey put out a solo album under his name. It was called "Outfitted for the Apocalypse." He also did spoken word work under the name Compost Press.

=== Reunions ===
The band has had several reunion shows. The first, featuring the original four members (Brandon, Wayne, Chris and John) was in July 2011, at the V Club in Huntington, WV. A month later, they made their way to Baltimore, Maryland to the Insubordination Records Festival, more commonly known as Insub Fest. The band also performed at the V Club in Huntington, WV on October 12, 2013.

=== Permanent members ===
- Wayne Griffith – bass
- Chris Griffith – drums, percussion
- John Spears – guitar

=== Former members ===
- Brandon Tussey – songwriter, singer, guitar
- Mike Webb – guitar
- Rob Lowe – guitar
- Dave Berger – guitar

== Discography ==
=== Full-length albums ===
1. 1997 The Connie Dungs (Mutant Pop Records)
2. 1998 Driving on Neptune (Mutant Pop Records)
3. 1999 Earthbound For The Holiday (Mutant Pop Records)
4. 1999 Songs For Swinging Nice Guys (Mutant Pop Records) (both self-released cassettes from 1995 on one CD)
5. 2000 Eternal Bad Luck Charm (Mutant Pop Records)

=== EPs and singles ===
1. 1995 Connie Dungs / Tugboat Split 7-inch EP (Smalltown Kids Records)
2. 1995 Missy and Johnny 7-inch EP (Harmless Records)
3. 1996 I Hate This Town 7-inch EP (Mutant Pop Records)
4. 1997 Connie Dungs / Operation: Cliff Clavin split 7-inch/CDEP (Plan It X Records)
5. 1997 Connie Dungs / Automatics (USA) split 10-inch EP (Cool Guy Records)
6. 1997 Connie Dungs / Slowpokes split 7-inch EP
7. 1997 No Chance 7-inch EP (Mutant Pop Records)
8. 2000 Turntable CDEP (Mutant Pop Records)

=== Demos and other releases ===
1. 1995 Songs For Swinging Lovers – self-released cassette sold at shows, 200 copies
2. 1995 Nice Guys Finish Last – self-released cassette sold at shows, 200 copies

=== Compilations ===
1. 1995 Shreds Volume 3-American Underground '95 (Shredder Records) – "Missy and Johnny"
2. 1996 The New Breed, Volume 3 (G.I. Productions) – "I Hate This Town" (vinyl version on CD)
3. 1996 Back Asswards (Interbang Records) – "Kill Me In My Sleep" (exclusive version)
4. 1996 The Best of Bumfuck Egypt Music Compilation 7-inch (Molasses Grave Records) (5 bands) – "Wonder Boy" (exclusive track)
5. 1997 Grease – The Not So Original Soundtrack from the Motion Picture (Dummyup Records) "Those Magic Changes" (Sha Na Na cover)
6. 1997 It Should Have Been a Record (Ape City Records)- "Used to be Cool" (exclusive version)
7. 1998 How To Be Punk – Volume 1 (Cool Guy Records) – "Teenage Punks On Talk Shows" (exclusive version)
8. 2000 Transylvania Style Punk Rock (Wornout Records) – "Barbara" (album version)

Source: Discogs
