= Survivor (Fifteen album) =

Studio album by Fifteen (band)
- Released: October 17, 2000
- Genre: Punk
- Label: Sub City Records

Fifteen (band) chronology
Lucky (1999)	Survivor (2000)

Survivor is the final album from punk band Fifteen released in 2000. The album is themed around tragedy and picking up the pieces, as can be seen in the title song, "Survivor", which starts out talking about how "America is a place where kids have broken hearts" and describing how member Jeff Ott became a homeless drug addict at the age of 14, but turns around to become a hopeful message about how Ott turned his life around and you can too.

== Track listing ==
1. "Greed"
2. "Survivor"
3. "Colorado"
4. "Vanessa"
5. "Landlord"
6. "Punk Song"
7. "Brian's Song"
8. "FBI"
9. "Child"
10. "Grace"
11. "Prostitute"
12. "Saturn Return"
13. "The Lost Generation"
14. "A Message to Mumia" (spoken by Assata Shakur)
15. Untitled (hidden track)
