= Nate Powell =

American graphic novelist and musician (born 1978)

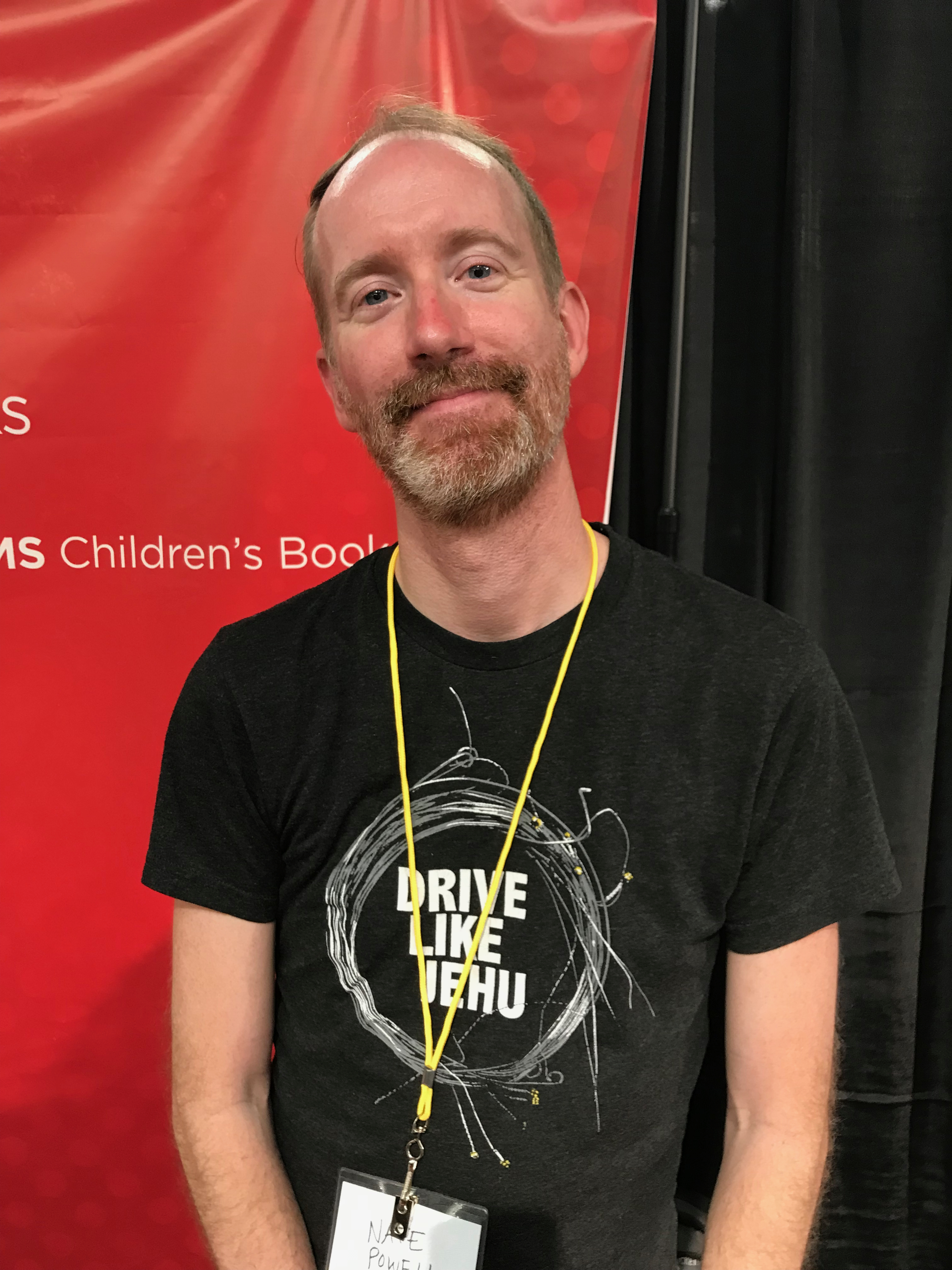
- Powell at the 2024 MoCCA Festival
- Born: July 31, 1978 (age 48) Little Rock, Arkansas
- Areas: Cartoonist, Writer, Penciller, Inker, Publisher, Letterer, Colourist
- Notable works: March; Any Empire; Swallow Me Whole; The Silence Of Our Friends
- Awards: Ignatz Award, 2008 & 2009; Eisner Award, 2009; National Book Award, 2016; Inkpot Award, 2017

Nathan Lee Powell (born 1978) is an American graphic novelist and musician. His 2008 graphic novel Swallow Me Whole won an Ignatz Award and Eisner Award for Best Original Graphic Novel. He illustrated the March trilogy, an autobiographical series written by U.S. Congressman John Lewis and Andrew Aydin, which received the 2016 National Book Award, making Powell the first cartoonist to receive the award.

== Early life ==
Powell was born July 31, 1978, in Little Rock, Arkansas. The child of an Air Force officer, Powell's family moved often, living in Montana and Alabama before returning to Little Rock. Powell attended North Little Rock High School and began self-publishing comics in 1992. That same year he founded the punk rock band Soophie Nun Squad with high school friends.

He graduated from 1996, and briefly attended George Washington University in Washington, DC. He transferred to the School of Visual Arts (SVA) in New York City, where he majored in Cartooning. Beginning in 2005, while at SVA, he would send Chris Staros and Brett Warnock, the founders of Top Shelf Productions, copies of every book he made. He graduated in 2000 after receiving the Outstanding Cartooning Student award and the Shakespeare & Company Books Self-Publishing Grant, with which he funded the first issue of Walkie Talkie.

== Career ==
Powell owned DIY punk record label Harlan Records and performed in several punk bands including Universe, Divorce Chord, WAIT, and Soophie Nun Squad.

From 1999 to 2009, he worked as a caregiver for adults with developmental disabilities.

His 2008 graphic novel Swallow Me Whole won the Ignatz Award for Outstanding Debut and Outstanding Artist, and was a finalist for the Los Angeles Times Book Prize in the Young Adult Fiction category. It received the 2009 Eisner Award for Best Original Graphic Novel, and was also nominated for Best Writer/Artist and Best Lettering.

In the early 2010s, Powell learned that Top Shelf would be publishing March, an autobiographical graphic novel trilogy about the life of civil rights leader and United States Congressman John Lewis, which had already been written by Lewis and his colleague, Andrew Aydin. A few weeks later, Powell was contacted by Chris Staros, who suggested he try out for the assignment. Although he already had other projects lined up, Powell sent some demo pages to Lewis and Aydin, who over the course of their subsequent correspondence realized that Powell would be well-suited for the job. Although Powell had illustrated stories that were "true to life," such as the 2012 graphic Silence of our Friends, this would be the first time he would depict real-life historical figures, 300 of which Powell estimates are rendered in total in the trilogy. The scene in which Lewis meets Martin Luther King Jr. for the first time was the first page Powell drew for March, and although he found approaching that page difficult, says it made subsequent depictions of real-life people easier. Powell's approach was to develop a visual shorthand for each real person he had to draw, in the form of a "master drawing" to act as a reference template for that person's features, one that emphasized the person's skull structure, in lieu of referring constantly to photo reference in the course of the project, so that the characters would not look "too stale or photo-derived." He employed lifestyle and illustration books from the 1950s and 1960s, as well as Google searches, to depict fashion and automobiles of given time periods accurately. Lewis says he found Powell's renditions of scenes from his early life "very moving." Top Shelf published March: Book One in November 2013. In January 2017, the American Library Association awarded March: Book Three the 2017 Printz Award, the Coretta Scott King Award, the YALSA Award for Excellence in Nonfiction, and the Sibert Medal. It was the first time a single book won four ALA awards. The trilogy received the Carter G. Woodson Book Award in 2017. On February 24, 2019, Powell published the comic About Face, a comic and visual essay about the gradual normalization of force in language and clothing, as well as the rising fascism in America.

Powell has worked on the graphic novel adaptation of Rick Riordan's The Heroes of Olympus: The Lost Hero, while working on his own next book, entitled Cover and the short comics collection You Don't Say.

On May 15, 2014, Powell was present at that year's commencement ceremony for his alma mater, the School of Visual Arts, when the school presented an Honorary Doctorate of Fine Arts to Powell's March collaborator, John Lewis. The second volume of March was scheduled for January 2015 release.

== Personal life ==
Powell lived intermittently in central Arkansas, while calling East Lansing, Michigan; South Hadley Falls, Massachusetts; and Providence, Rhode Island, home from 2001 to 2003. He married Rachel Lee Bormann, a social worker, in 2010, and the couple lives in Bloomington, Indiana, with their two daughters.

== Awards ==
- 2008: Ignatz Award Outstanding Debut and Outstanding Artist for Swallow Me Whole
- 2009: Ignatz Award Outstanding Graphic Novel for Swallow Me Whole
- 2009: Eisner Award Best Original Graphic Novel for Swallow Me Whole
- 2014: Coretta Scott King Award "Author Honor" for March: Book One
- 2014: Robert F. Kennedy Book Award "Special Recognition" bust for March: Book One
- 2016: The National Book Award for Young People's Literature for March: Book Three
- 2017: Carter G. Woodson Book Award for March, with collaborators John Lewis and Andrew Aydin

== Bibliography ==
- D.O.A. #1-4 (co-writer, co-artist. 9/92-4/93, Food Chain Productions)
- Food Chain Holiday Special (writer, artist. 12/92, Food Chain)
- D.O.A. #-47 F (writer, artist. 12/93, Food Chain)
- The Schwa Sound #1-14 (2/94-5/99, Food Chain)
- Arsenic (5/94, Food Chain)
- Billy Crash (8/95, Food Chain)
- Pantheon #1 (with Ben Nichols and Ken Edge. 2/96, Food Chain)
- The Playground Messiah (with Emil Heiple. 5/96, Food Chain; reprinted in 1998 by Tree of Knowledge Press)
- Conditions (4/99, Food Chain; French translation in 2001 by Small Budget Productions)
- Frankenbones (with Emil Heiple. 5/99, Food Chain)
- Wonderful Broken Thing (12/99, Food Chain)
- Walkie Talkie #1-4 (5/00-6/02, Food Chain)
- Good Night For a Daydream (with Jenny Holt. 8/00, Food Chain)
- Tiny Giants (6/03, Soft Skull Press)
- It Disappears (6/04, Soft Skull Press)
- illustrations for Joyland (by Emily Schultz. 3/06, ECW Press)
- Sounds of Your Name (9/06, Microcosm Publishing)
- Please Release (10/06, Top Shelf Productions)
- Cakewalk (written by Rachel Bormann)/ Bets Are Off (9/08, self-released)
- Swallow Me Whole (10/08, Top Shelf Productions)
- Papercutter #12 (written by Rachel Bormann. 3/10, Tugboat Press)
- illustrations for Edible Secrets (by Michael Hoerger and Mia Partlow. 12/10, Microcosm Publishing)
- Sweet Tooth #19 (with Jeff Lemire, Matt Kindt, and Emi Lenox. 3/11, Vertigo Comics)
- Any Empire (7/11, Top Shelf Productions)
- "Conjurers" included in the young adult fiction anthology What You Wish For (9/11, Putnam Books/ Bookwish Foundation)
- The Silence Of Our Friends (written by Mark Long and Jim Demonakos. 1/12, First Second Books)
- The Year Of The Beasts (written by Cecil Castellucci. 5/12, Roaring Brook Press)
- Sweet Tooth #34 (with Jeff Lemire. 6/12, Vertigo)
- March: Book One (with Congressman John Lewis and Andrew Aydin, 2013, Top Shelf Productions)
- March: Book Two (with John Lewis and Andrew Aydin, 2015, Top Shelf Productions)
- March: Book Three (with John Lewis and Andrew Aydin, 2016, Top Shelf Productions)
- Come Again (2018, Top Shelf Productions)
- Save It for Later: Promises, Protest, and the Urgency of Protest (2021, Top Shelf Productions)
- Lies My Teacher Told Me: A Graphic Adaptation (2024, The New Press), based on 1995 book with the same title by James W. Loewen
