= Can Kickers =

American band

The Can Kickers
- Origin: New London, Connecticut, USA
- Genres: Americana; Folk punk Alternative country
- Years active: 2000–present
- Labels: Cosmodemonic Telegraph; Arkam Records
- Members: Doug Schaefer; Daniel Spurr; Daniel Thompson

The Can Kickers are an Americana band based out of New London, Connecticut. The group formed in 2000 while the members were attending Connecticut College.

== Career ==
The Can Kickers are an Americana band based in New London, Connecticut. According to the Huntsville Times, The Can Kickers sound like "the Carter family meets the Ramones." They have toured Germany, the United States, Ireland, Mexico, and the Netherlands. On January 31, 2006, the band's live show in Philadelphia was recorded for a live CD and released on Fistolo Records. The Can Kickers played their 500th show in September 2006 at the El 'n' Gee in New London.

The Can Kickers played over 30 shows on their Mexican tour and travelled with Polka Madre y La Comezon. While touring in Mexico their van was pulled over 17 times. During this 2007 Mexican tour, of their show in Guadalajara, Mural said that they and Polka Madre were a "perfect combination which mixes such quite distinct styles as polka with a punk attitude."

They are represented on the 2006 compilation album Towers of New London, Vol. 4: Eminent Domain (Cosmodemonic Telegraph) with the song "Johnny Walker".

== Members ==
- Doug Schaefer – drums, washboard, vocals
- Daniel Spurr – banjo, gitfiddle, vocals (yodeling)
- Daniel Thompson – fiddle, mouth organ, jawharp

== Discography ==
Cds

- Dead Music I
- Dead Music II, 2002
- Mountain Dudes, 2003
- Fire in the East, Fire in the West, 2005
- We're Dying But We Ain't Dead, 2006
- Live at Lavazone, 2007

7-inch vinyl

- Fire in the East, Fire in the West, 2002 (Arkam Records)
- Dark Molly, 2007 (Arkam Records)
