= The Choice of a New Generation =

Choice of a New Generation

Studio album by Fifteen
- Released: 1992
- Recorded: Summer 1992
- Studio: Art of Ears Studio in San Francisco
- Genre: Punk rock
- Length: 44:50
- Label: Lookout Records
- Producer: Andy Ernst

Fifteen chronology
Swain's First Bike Ride (1991)	Choice of a New Generation (1992)	Buzz (1994)

Professional ratings
Review scores
Source	Rating
AllMusic	4/5 stars

Choice of a New Generation is the second album by the punk rock band Fifteen. It was released in 1992 through Lookout! Records. It is similar to the band's debut album, as it features long punk songs that deal with love and social commentary.

It is the only Fifteen album to feature Lucky Dog on bass and backing vocals.

== Track listing ==
No.	Title	Length
1.	"Petroleum Distillation"	5:16
2.	"The End of the Summer"	3:08
3.	"Separation 2"	4:12
4.	"Communication"	3:40
5.	"Domination=Destruction"	3:57
6.	"Lookin' For Trouble"	2:20
7.	"Separation 1"	4:26
8.	"Perfection"	3:56
9.	"Fation"	4:15
10.	"Rejection"	3:15
11.	"Sweet Distraction"	2:30
12.	"The End of the Century"	3:55
Total length:		44:50

== Personnel ==
- Jeff Ott – lead vocals, guitar
- Lucky Dog – bass, backing vocals
- Mark Moreno – drums, backing vocals

Production

- Andy Ernst– producer
- John Golden – mastering
