= Lucky (Fifteen album) =

Studio album by Fifteen
- Released: 27 April 1999
- Genre: Punk rock
- Label: Sub City

Fifteen chronology
Surprise! (1996)	Lucky (1999)	Survivor (2000)

Lucky is a 1999 album by the punk band Fifteen, named after local musician (and former bassist for the band) Rich "Lucky Dog" Gargano, who had recently committed suicide. The album was filled with political songs, most notably ones like "Stolen Life", where singer/songwriter Jeff Ott takes an anti-police stance, and "My Congressman" and "War On Drugs", which criticize the government for hurting drug addicts and non-violent drug users and accusing politicians for using them as a scapegoat and an excuse for "genocidal" campaigns (e.g. "incarcerating all the homeless"). Drugs would later become Jeff Ott's main focus as an activist, having been a drug addict for most of his life (starting when he became homeless around age 14). Some fans consider this to be one of Fifteen and Jeff Ott’s greatest masterpieces, having a lasting impact nearly 30 years later.

== Track listing ==
1. "Family Values"
2. "Lucky"
3. "My Congressman"
4. "I Am a Man"
5. "Man Against Man"
6. "Stolen Life"
7. "Evolve"
8. "Welcome to Berkeley"
9. "Mount Shrink Wrap"
10. "Land
11. "War on Drugs
12. "We Will Win
13. "Sinseriously"
14. "Payback is Beautiful"
15. "When the Hell is He Going to Fucking Shut Up Already? (Spoken)"

== Personnel ==
- Jeff Ott - Lead Vocals, Lead Guitar
- Jean Repetto - Rhythm Guitar
- Scott Pierce - Bass
- Mark Moreno - Drums
