= Fifteen (band) =

American punk rock band

- Origin: United States
- Genre: Punk
- Years active: 1988–1996; 1998–2000; 2024-present
- Labels: Lookout Records, Grass Records, Sub City
- Past members: Jeff Ott; Jack Curran; Mikey Mischief; Mark Moreno; Jean Repetto; Lucky Dog; Chris Flanagan; John Ogle; Jesse Wickman; Joe Cable; John Quintos; Scott Pierce; Jim Prior; Lisa D. Vanessa Bain

Fifteen is a punk rock band formed by Jeff Ott and Jack Curran. According to Ott, the band's only consistent member in its history, Fifteen had a revolving door total of fifteen members by the time the group originally disbanded in 2000: Jack Curran, Mikey Mischief, Mark Moreno, Jean Repetto, Lucky Dog, Chris Flanagan, John Ogle, Jesse Wickman, Joe Cable, John Quintos, Scott Pierce, Jim Prior, Lisa D., Vanessa Bain and Ott himself.

== History ==
Fifteen formed in 1988 during the tail end of the Crimpshrine tour while Ott and Curran were writing songs together. After Crimpshrine broke up, Fifteen embarked on their first tour, in the summer of 1989. During this time, Jean Repetto played drums. Although the band drove across the country, they only played a handful of shows on this first tour. Upon returning from tour, Mike Goshert took over drums. Fifteen recorded their debut EP in April 1990 for Lookout! Records. Fifteen went on a more substantial tour in the summer of 1990 with Filth and Econochrist. Mark Moreno took over on drums and they recorded their first full-length album, Swain's First Bike Ride, in December 1990. In 1991, Rich "Lucky Dog" Gargano joined the band on bass. Curran switched over to second guitar briefly, before leaving the band in 1992. In summer of 1992, the band toured the US and Canada, and recorded their second album, The Choice of a New Generation. Afterwards, Lucky Dog and Mark Moreno left the band and Curran returned, joined by Jesse Wickman on drums. The band released their second EP and third album with Chris Flanagan on drums, and went on three more US tours before their first and only European tour in fall of 1994. Afterwards, Curran left for good.

Fifteen released their 1995 album Extra Medium Kick Ball Star on their own Cool Guy Records label with John Ogle on bass, followed by their fifth album, Surprise!, after which the band broke up. Their final show on June 14 of 1996 was later released as the live record Allegra. The group reformed in late 1997 with former members Ott, Mark Moreno, and Jean Repetto, along with Scott Pierce. In 1999 they released Lucky on Subcity Records and participated in that label's first Take Action Tour. Most of the Lucky album, are song first done by a band that attempted to not have a name, but was named by others, Jeff, Tim, and Adam. This line-up dissolved following the departure of Jean during the album's recording, and then Scott leaving just after the Take Action Tour. A new line-up existed briefly, recording the Hush EP and the album Survivor, but this version of Fifteen did not tour. Fifteen broke up again in 2000.

Ott returned to his solo career for several years, releasing another record, Will Work for Diapers. In 2007 he abandoned his solo career as well, saying simply that he was busy with school. In December 2011, Ott and Curran reunited Fifteen to play two Bay Area benefit shows.

By 2018, Dead Broke Rekerds had reissued several of the band's albums.

== Songwriting and politics ==
Fifteen was notable for their lyrical content and political beliefs as much as their music. Ott approached political issues in a more personal, "storyteller" mode than is typical of punk rock music. Fifteen addressed issues such as environmentalism, pacifism, homelessness, drug addiction, child abuse, racism and sexism. Ott's lyrics were often written in the first-person narrative style, as he himself was a victim of child abuse and was homeless for much of the band's early career. Jeff Ott is also a recovering alcoholic and drug addict.

A running theme in Fifteen song titles is the "-tion" suffix, a spin on the Descendents' use of the "age" suffix in their song titles. Some Fifteen songs, such as "My Friend II" and "Liberation II", are often sequels to songs written by Ott.

Many Fifteen songs are tributes to friends of the band who have died, including "Lucky", "Front", "Chris' Song", and "Welcome to Berkeley". "Brian's Song" on the album Survivor refers to the death of Brian Deneke.

Love songs are featured prominently on the first three Fifteen albums, but are completely absent from later releases. This is because the love songs were primarily written by Curran. Ott addresses his stance towards love songs in the track "Liberation II", a song about codependency.

== Discography ==
Year	Title	Label	Format and comments
1990	Fifteen	Lookout! Records	7"
1991	Swain's First Bike Ride	Lookout! Records	CD/12"/CS
1992	The Choice of a New Generation	Lookout! Records	CD/12"/CS Reissued 2018
1994	Ain't Life a Drag	Iteration Records / Spring Box	7"
1994	Buzz	Grass Records / Plan It X	CD/12"/CS
1995	Extra Medium Kick Ball Star (17)	Rebel Alliance Records / Cool Guy Records / Sub City Records	CD/12"
1996	Surprise!	Grass Records / Plan It X	CD/12"/CS
1996	There's No Place Like Home (Good Night)	Lookout! Records	CD
1996	Ooze	Lookout! Records	7" (Contains only '924' and 'Landmine' from There's no Place Like Home
1996	Allegra	No Records / Cool Guy Records / Sub City Records	CD/12"
1999	Lucky	Sub City Records	CD/12"/CS
2000	Hush	Sub City Records	CD/12"
2000	Survivor	Sub City Records	CD/12"
2010	Can You Spare Some Change?	Solidarity Recordings	7" (Split with For.The.Win. and Hanalei) NEED/Long Haul Benefit EP
2016	Live At Gilman St.	Dream Militia	7"
