= Shake Ray Turbine =

American rock/punk band

- Origin: Little Rock, Arkansas, United States
- Genres: Indie rock Math rock
- Years active: 1995–2000
- Labels: File Thirteen Records, Harlan Records
- Members: Ben Dickey (vocals, guitar); Clay Simmons (vocals, guitar); Dustin Clark (bass 1995–1999); Jeb Bell (bass 1999–2000); Chris Wilson (drums); Richard Matson (vocals summer 1995)

Shake Ray Turbine was an American DIY rock/punk band from Little Rock, Arkansas, United States. They formed in the summer of 1995 and played their first show that August with Richard Matson as vocalist. The band toured and recorded from 1996-1998. As of late 1998, Shake Ray Turbine had material for their second full-length album (with several songs reaching the 7-14 minute marks), but none of these songs were ever recorded; their last show as Arkansas residents was with Fugazi in Conway, AR in November 1998. The band relocated to Philadelphia around January 1999; soon after, Dustin Clark left the band and Jeb Bell (Fracture) took over on bass.

This new lineup became The Unfixers and recorded an album at Philadelphia studio, Meat Locker. Soon after, they disbanded and the album remained unreleased. One track of that album, Pace, was released on a File Thirteen Records compilation. They played their last show in Philadelphia around the end of 2000.

Ben Dickey's subsequent band Amen Booze Rooster recorded and released one of the unrecorded 1998 Shake Ray Turbine songs, "Lemon Ice Box Pie", on their 7" on Max Recordings and Hot Dog City Records in 2003.

Members have also played in the bands Amen Booze Rooster, Blood Feathers, Flip'n Sync, Soophie Nun Squad, William Martyr 17, Revolver Red, The Cannonballs, Hiram Ragan Experience, The Insides, Lazy Fair, The Earthworms, Hundred Years War, Heads Are Heavy, Fuse of Ire, Basil, Stoney Jacksons, Full Service Quartet, Sean Na Na, Ted Leo and the Pharmacists, The Lapse, and Aspera.

== Albums ==
- The Sauce of Solution CD on File Thirteen Records joint release with Harlan Records. November 1997.
- Untitled, unreleased album recorded in 1999 as The Unfixers

== Extended plays ==
Split 7" with Full Service Quartet on Landmark Records
Split 7" with The Divine Hookup on Donut Friends Records

== Compilations ==
Song, Pace, on the Listen to What I'm Made Of compilation CD (As The Unfixers)

== Trivia ==
- Drummer, Chris Wilson, went on to play drums for Ted Leo and the Pharmacists, Sean Na Na, Titus Andronicus, and many others.
- John Pugh, drummer for popular indie/funk/dance band !!! appears as a guest vocalist on tracks 10 and 11 of The Sauce of Solution
- Ben Dickey starred as Blaze Foley in Blaze (2018 film) and received critical acclaim.

== Resources ==
Shake Ray Turbine on MySpace
Clay Simmons talks about Shake Ray Turbine's last show with Fugazi
Ben Dickey on IMDB
Ben Dickey Music
