= Swain's First Bike Ride =

- Original vinyl cover

Studio album by Fifteen
- Released: 1991
- Recorded: December 1990–January 1991
- Studio: Sound and Vision Studios in San Francisco and Dancing Dog Studios in Emeryville, California
- Genre: Punk rock
- Length: 40:10; 54:29 (CD version)
- Label: Lookout (LK 040)
- Producer: Kevin Army; Andy Ernst (CD bonus tracks)

Fifteen chronology
Swain's First Bike Ride (1991)	The Choice of a New Generation (1992)

CD cover

Professional ratings
Review scores
Source	Rating
AllMusic	4/5 stars

Swain's First Bike Ride is the debut studio album by the Berkeley, California-based punk rock band Fifteen. It was originally released on vinyl in 1991 through Lookout Records with the catalog number LK 040. The songs can generally be described as mid-tempo punk rock with pop sensibilities. The album also has quite a few love songs (including "C#(tion)", which was covered by Green Day, and "Sweet Valentine"), which was something that was phased out on later albums. The record closes with Fifteen's only piano ballad, "The End", which is often considered to be one of the band's best songs. The album's CD edition, released on February 10, 1992, contains the band's self-titled EP from the previous year as bonus tracks. The album was re-released in 2017 by Dead Broke Records on vinyl, CD, and digitally.

== Track listing ==
All tracks are written by Jeff Ott, except where noted.

Side one
No.	Title	Length
1.	"Intentions"	3:50
2.	"Definition"	4:25
3.	"C#(tion)"	4:06
4.	"Someday" (lyrics by Jack Curran; music by Ott and Curran)	4:17
5.	"Alienation"	3:25

Side two
No.	Title	Length
6.	"Implications"	4:17
7.	"Resolution"	4:56
8.	"Inclination" (lyrics by Jack Curran; music by Ott and Curran)	3:02
9.	"Subdivision"	4:24
10.	"The End"	3:25
Total length:		40:10

CD bonus tracks (Fifteen EP)
No.	Title	Length
11.	"Liberation" (lyrics by Ott and Ricardo Lopez)	2:58
12.	"Sweet Valentine" (lyrics by Jack Curran; music by Ott and Curran)	3:58
13.	"Devotion" (lyrics by Jack Curran; music by Ott)	3:55
14.	"Imagination" (lyrics by Jack Curran; music by Ott and Curran)	3:27
Total length:		14:19

== Personnel ==
- Jeff Ott – lead vocals, guitar, piano
- Jack Curran (credited as Tommy Moreno) – bass, backing vocals
- Mark Moreno – drums, backing vocals
- Mikey Mischief – drums on CD bonus tracks

Production

- Kevin Army – producer
- Andy Ernst – producer of CD bonus tracks
- John Golden – mastering
