= Pat the Bunny (musician) =

Folk punk musician

- Pat the Bunny performing with Ramshackle Glory in 2011.

Background information
- Born: Patrick Schneeweis; May 7, 1987 (age 39); Brattleboro, Vermont, United States
- Genres: Anarcho-punk; folk punk; riot-folk; Hip-Hop
- Occupations: Musician, singer-songwriter, producer
- Instruments: Vocals; guitar; bass; trumpet; harmonica
- Years active: 2000–2016, 2019, 2025-present
- Website: patthebunnymusic.weebly.com

Patrick Schneeweis, better known by his former stage name Pat the Bunny, is an American musician, singer-songwriter, and producer. He was the front man of several notable folk punk and anarcho-punk groups including Johnny Hobo and the Freight Trains, Wingnut Dishwashers Union, and Ramshackle Glory. He is currently in the band Friends in Real Life. Originally based out of Brattleboro, Vermont, he lived in Tucson, Arizona during the final part of his musical career. His writing often describes topics such as life under capitalism, drug addiction, and the importance of pursuing radical ways of relating socially and economically, usually through anarchism and the DIY ethic.

== Biography ==
Schneeweis was born in Brattleboro, Vermont. He has been playing music with his younger brother, Michael, for a long time. He attended the Putney School for a short period of time. His father, Charlie Schneeweis, plays the trumpet.

In 2009, Schneeweis checked himself into rehab for heroin and alcohol addiction. He stated on his website that he was not sure if he would continue with music after rehab. Once out of rehab, he moved to Tucson, Arizona, and formed Ramshackle Glory. After rehab, Schneeweis released a slew of Ramshackle Glory records, solo acoustic records, and split albums with other DIY musicians. He toured both with Ramshackle Glory and independently for the next five years.

In February 2016, he announced that he was at least temporarily retiring from music, stating that the ideologies of punk rock and anarchism no longer matched his own. Ramshackle Glory played their final show at the final Plan-it-X Fest in June 2016. They released their final album, "One Last Big Job," in December 2016. Patrick Schneeweis announced he will eventually donate the proceeds of his solo work and his band's releases through the social media music platform Bandcamp to bail funds in Vermont and Arizona.

In 2019, Schneeweis was brought out by Ceschi to play "This City Is Killing Me" off of their split EP.

In January 2025, Schneeweis returned with a new band, Friends in Real Life. Their debut album released in February 2025.

=== Johnny Hobo and the Freight Trains ===
Johnny Hobo and the Freight Trains
- Origin: Brattleboro, Vermont
- Genres: Anarcho-punk, folk punk, Riot-Folk
- Years active: 2000–2007
- Labels: Spare Change Records, DIY Bandits
- Members: Flash-C – trumpet Ian Skumfuk – washtub bass Jeff-Face – harmonica Michael Jordan – drums Pat the Bunny – guitar, vocals Roma – bicycle drums Rockstar Mike – bass drum Wyatt – harmonica

Pat's first major recording project was called "Running with Meat Cleavers" and was inspired by the contemporary Brattleboro punk scene, including bands such as Vomit Dichotomy and Fancy Pants & the Cell Phones. Following this was a band whose name would regularly change and was tongue-in-cheek, with the format of "Johnny ___ and the ___." For example, the band was called "Johnny Sexless and the Virgin Mafia" to reflect the themes of the song "DIY Orgasms." Eventually the name "Johnny Hobo" stuck, despite the vocal irritation of Pat himself at this name. The first demo was primarily solo, with just acoustic guitar played atop programmed drums. The group quickly expanded and became entirely acoustic. Johnny Hobo toured extensively during their career; often, Pat would be the only touring member. Alcohol, drug use, homelessness, politics, suicide, and the punk scene were common themes in Johnny Hobo songs. Song for a Harmony Parking Lot may be in reference to a parking lot in Schneeweis's hometown of Brattleboro, where Schneeweis once did a nude sit-in protest and was quoted as saying, "It's too hot to wear clothes." They released four EPs, two splits, a live album, and two compilations before disbanding.

Demos/EPs

Year	Title	Label	Format
2003 (not found until 2021)	Fire Hazard	Self-Release	CD-R
2003	Anarchy Means I Hate You	Spare Change Records	CD-R
2004	Easter Sunday Hangover	Spare Change Records	CD-R
2005	All Power to the Wingnuts	Spare Change Records	CD-R
2006	Chaos Infiltration Squad	Spare Change Records	CD-R

Split Albums

Year	Title	Label	Format
2005	Live at Bandit H.Q. (Split with Captain Chaos)	DIY Bandits	CD-R
2005	Love Songs for the Apocalypse (Split with ManTits)	DIY Bandits	CD

Live

Year	Title	Label	Format
2005	Caught in the Act of Not Being Awesome	Spare Change Records	CD-R
2007	Live in Cortland	Bootleg	Cassette, Digital

Compilation

Year	Title	Label	Format
2006	...is Dead!	Spare Change Records	CD-R
2009	Smash the Plate! (Johnny Hobo and Wingnut Dishwashers Union from 2007 and Before)	Spare Change Records	CD-R
2019	FIGHT LIKE HELL (recordings from 2004 to 2007)	DIY Bandits	Vinyl, Digital

=== Mr. Michael Motorcycle ===
Mr. Michael Motorcycle
- Origin: Brattleboro, Vermont
- Genres: pop rock, folk, acoustic
- Years active: 2005–present
- Labels: Spare Change Records, DIY Bandits, Plan-It-X Records, Savage Wasteland Music Collective
- Members: Michael Schneeweis – guitar, bass, drums, vocals
- Past members: Pat The Bunny – bass, vocals (live)
- Website: mrmichaelmotorcycle.bandcamp.com

Mr. Michael Motorcycle is a solo recording project of Pat's younger brother, Michael, which began when he was 15. It was previously known as the Michael Jordan Touchdown Pass and Michael Jumpshot Touchdown Pass. Three albums were also released under the name sadjoy. Pat played bass and back-up vocals during live shows. Michael has played with Ramshackle Glory live on at least one occasion.

=== Wingnut Dishwashers Union ===
Wingnut Dishwashers Union
- Origin: Brattleboro, Vermont
- Genres: Anarcho-punk, folk punk, Riot-Folk
- Years active: 2007–2009
- Labels: Spare Change Records, DIY Bandits, Triumph Of Life, Crafty Records
- Members: Adhi – saxophone Agatha – banjo Alex – vocals, guitar Dallas – drums, bass Davis – drums Douglas – theremin Emily – cello Flash-C – trumpet, drums Ian Skumfuk – washtub bass Jacob – guitar Kris Cain– bass Matt – guitar, bass, trumpet, slide guitar, piano Michael – clarinet Michael Jordan – drums Mike – guitar, harmonica, piano, accordion, bass Nick – drums Pat the Bunny – guitar, vocals Scott – drums Thorin – guitar

With the ending of Johnny Hobo, Pat continued writing songs and formed the Wingnut Dishwashers Union. Similar to Johnny Hobo, Wingnut Dishwashers Union toured constantly, often just with Pat. In contrast to Johnny Hobo, many songs used electric rather than acoustic guitar. The influential Pennsylvania band Endless Mike and the Beagle Club accompanied Pat on “Burn the Earth, Leave it Behind!” They released three full-length albums, two splits, and a compilation during their two-year career, in addition to a solo rendition of their debut album by Pat. Their song topics diverged slightly from Johnny Hobo and the Freight Trains with a more hopeful view of the future. Wingnut Dishwashers Union broke up when Pat entered rehab at the end of 2009.

Full-length albums

Year	Title	Label	Format
2007	Toward a World Without Dishwashers	Spare Change Records	CD-R
2008	Never Trust a Man Who plays Guitar	Spare Change Records	CD-R, Digital
2009	Burn the Earth! Leave it Behind!	DIY Bandits	CD, Digital

Split Albums

Year	Title	Label	Format
2008	Wingnut Dishwashers Union / James K. Polk and the Family- Split	Triumph of Life	7"
2009	Partner in Crime No. 2 (Mischief Brew, Guitar Bomb, Endless Mike and the Beagle Club, Wingnut Dishwashers Union Split)	Crafty Records	7"

Live

Year	Title	Label	Format
2007	Live in Plattsburgh, NY	Spare Change Records	Digital
2008	Kalamazoo, MI (4/6/2008)	Bootleg	Digital

Compilation

Year	Title	Label	Format
2009	Smash the Plate! (Johnny Hobo and Wingnut Dishwashers Union from 2007 and Before)	Spare Change Records	CD-R

=== Playtime Posse ===
Playtime Posse
- Origin: Brattleboro, Vermont
- Genre: hip hop
- Years active: 2009–2010
- Label: Rhymetonia Records
- Members: B.C. A.K.A. the Big Chomp A.K.A. Beat Creep A.K.A. Kick the Gong Entertainment; China White; Count Compost; Monocular A.K.A. SK Murda A.K.A. Filthy T Pat The Bunny

"The Green Mountain State's second-best rap crew, shattering all preconceptions and slanderous chatter, is a hot buttery corn muffin of rhyme." A humorous hip-hop side-project formed by Pat and several friends.

Full-length album

Year	Title	Label	Format
2010	Summertime Sounds of the Playtime Posse	Rhymetonia Records	Digital

=== Solo ===
Pat "The Bunny"
- Origin: Tucson, Arizona
- Genres: Anarcho-punk, folk punk, Riot-Folk
- Years active: 2010–2016
- Labels: Savage Wasteland Music Collective, Plan-It-X Records, DIY Bandits
- Members: Pat The Bunny – guitar, vocals

Shortly after discharge from an in-patient drug treatment facility, Schneeweis moved to Tucson, Arizona, and began writing new material about political agitation and his battles with drug addiction. Most of these songs were used by the band Ramshackle Glory. However, during Ramshackle Glory's hiatus, Pat began focusing on a solo path. In 2012, he started releasing new solo music. From the beginning of 2014 until his retirement, Pat was touring frequently as a solo act. After his South Eastern United States tour in October 2015, Pat announced that he would be taking a long break from shows and touring, though he would be releasing a final album with Ramshackle Glory.

In February 2016, Pat announced that he would be ending his music career altogether, stating a change in identity in contrast to his former persona as "Pat the Bunny."

Full-length album

Year	Title	Label	Format
2011	Die the Nightmare	Savage Wasteland Music Collective	CD-R, Digital
2014	Probably Nothing, Possibly Everything	Savage Wasteland Music Collective, Plan-It-X Records	CD, Cassette, Vinyl, Digital

Split album

Year	Title	Label	Format
2016	Ceschi / Pat The Bunny split 12"	DIY Bandits	Vinyl
2016	Surprise! Moon Bandits / Pat The Bunny Postcard Split	Moon Bandits	Flexi Disc, Digital

Demos/EPs

Year	Title	Label	Format
2013	The Mark Inside	Savage Wasteland Music Collective	CD-R, Digital
2013	The Volatile Utopian Real Estate Market	Savage Wasteland Music Collective	CD-R, Digital
2014	Dividing the Sand (September Demo)	Savage Wasteland Music Collective	Digital
2014	This City is Killing me, ft. Ceschi (October Demo)	Savage Wasteland Music Collective	Digital
2015	Cocoon Music	Self-Release	Digital

Live

Year	Title	Label	Format
2011	Pat the Bunny Live @ Tuscan 2/3/11	Bootleg	Digital

Compilation

Year	Title	Label	Format
2014	The Volatile Utopian Real Estate Market (Collection of Die the Nightmare, The Mark Inside, and The Volatile Utopian Real Estate Market)	Savage Wasteland Music Collective	CD, Vinyl, Digital

=== Ramshackle Glory ===
Ramshackle Glory
- Origin: Tucson, Arizona
- Genres: anarcho-punk, punk, folk punk
- Years active: 2010–2016
- Labels: Savage Wasteland Music Collective, DIY Bandits, Plan-It-X Records, Get Better Records
- Past members: Alyssa Kai – clarinet Andrew Link – bass (2012); Charlie Schneeweis – horns (2011); Dane Rossman – bass Dottie Possee – bass, trombone Dylan Kordani – guitar Douglas-Fur – banjo, violin, tambourine (2011–2012); Eric "Johnny" Freedom – trumpet Luke Romano – drums Michael Schneeweis – trumpet (2013); Nick Berger- accordion, vocals Patrick Schneeweis – guitar, vocals Wyndham Maxwell – piano

After discharge from in-patient drug treatment, Schneeweis moved to Tucson, Arizona, began writing new music about the politics of drug addiction, and formed the full-electric band Ramshackle Glory. They released two full-length albums, toured the country twice, and then took a hiatus from 2012 to 2013. The group got back together, released a split album with Ghost Mice in 2013, and went on another cross-country tour. They broke up in 2016 following a farewell show at Plan-It-X Fest in Bloomington, Indiana, and the release of their third and final album.

Full-length albums

Year	Title	Label	Format
2011	Live the Dream	Savage Wasteland Music Collective, DIY Bandits, Plan-It-X Records	CD, Cassette, Vinyl, Digital
2012	Who are Your Friends Gonna Be?	Savage Wasteland Music Collective, DIY Bandits	CD, Digital
2016	One Last Big Job	Get Better Records	CD, Cassette, Digital

Split album

Year	Title	Label	Format
2013	Shelter (Split with Ghost Mice)	Savage Wasteland Music Collective, Plan-It-X Records	CD, Vinyl, Digital

=== One Man Romance ===
One Man Romance
- Origin: Tucson, Arizona
- Genres: Alternative rock, folk punk, pop punk
- Years active: 2011–2016
- Label: Savage Wasteland Music Collective
- Members: Colin – drums, bass, guitar Pat The Bunny – guitar, bass, vocals Wyndham Maxwell – piano, guitar, vocals, melodica
- Past members: Douglas Fur – banjo, vocals, guitar Lane Doubt-it – harmonica Luke Romano – drums Michael Jordan – drums Nick Berger – violin

One Man Romance is a pop band originally from Tucson, Arizona, and the lead singer and songwriter, Wyndham Maxwell, now resides in Worcester, Massachusetts.

Full-length album

Year	Title	Label	Format
2011	Second Treatise on Love and Timing	Savage Wasteland Music Collective	CD-R, Digital
2013	Dark Crystals (Part One)	Savage Wasteland Music Collective	CD-R, Digital

=== Big Swamp Gospel ===
Big Swamp Gospel
- Origin: Tucson, Arizona
- Genres: country, folk punk
- Years active: 2013–2016
- Label: Savage Wasteland Music Collective
- Members: Pat The Bunny – guitar, bass, drums, vocals Wyndham Maxwell – piano, drums, bass, vocals

Big Swamp Gospel is a fictional narrative album about god and the devil, set in a spooky small town.

Full-length album

Year	Title	Label	Format
2013	Big Swamp Gospel	Savage Wasteland Music Collective	CD-R, Digital

=== Friends In Real Life ===
After a period of retirement, Schneeweis returned with a new band, Friends In Real Life. They released their debut self-titled album on February 21, 2025.

Year	Title	Label	Format
2025	Friends In Real Life	Low Capacity Music	CD, Digital, Cassette, Vinyl
2026	New Practices	Low Capacity Music	CD, Digital, Cassette, Vinyl

Friends In Real Life
- Origin: Tucson, Arizona
- Genre: Folk, Pop
- Years active: 2025-present
- Members: Patrick Schneeweis - vocals, rhythm guitar, beats Michael Schneeweis - vocals, bass, rhythm guitar, beats Charlie Schneeweis - vocals, synths, horns, beats, bass, lead guitar

== Personal life ==
As of 2011, Schneeweis is sober and off drugs, describing it as his "life for a very long time."
