= Fall of the West Records =

- Founded: 2005
- Founder: Brian Van Slyke; Alex Felsinger
- Genre: Punk
- Country of origin: U.S.
- Location: San Francisco, Amherst, Oak Park
- Official website: www.fallofthewest.com

Fall of the West Records (FOTW) is an independent record label based out of San Francisco, California, Oak Park, Illinois, and Amherst, Massachusetts. FOTW was started in May 2005 by Brian Van Slyke and Alex Felsinger after networking on the internet. Their releases consist of punk and folk punk bands from across the United States and Canada.

== Beliefs ==
The name is tongue-in-cheek. The label was formed during the height of the Bush administration when conservative political pundits would argue that gay rights, an end to the wars in Iraq and Afghanistan, and other leftist ideas (which FOTW supports) would lead to an end to western civilization as we know it.

The label is currently on hiatus and is trying to restructure after being robbed while simultaneously having all of its major equipment malfunction.

During these rebuilding efforts, the collective members have agreed to volunteer their time and not get paid.

== Means of production ==
Originally, Van Slyke produced the releases in the basement of his Oak Park home, doing every step of the production with the exception of cutting the booklets—a task that is now easily performed.

Most production—with a few exceptions (including the label's first cassette release which was produced from Felsinger's home in San Francisco) -- occurs in Van Slyke's residence in Amherst. The label has officially become collectivized and a group of friends have come together to assist with the production of the label's 14 releases.

== List of bands ==
- Bookends
- Captain Chaos
- The Capstan Shafts
- David and the Bear
- The English Work Standard
- Forgotten Voices
- Gator Country
- Giant Squid March on Washington
- The Le Nouns
- Mancub
- On the Strings Of
- The Riot Before
- Tennessee and the Wolf
- This One's on Me
- This Ship Will Burn
