= Dublin Community Television =

Local community television channel broadcasting from Dublin, Ireland

Dublin Community Television (DCTV)
- Country: Ireland
- Broadcast area: Dublin

Ownership
- Owner: Members of DCTV

History
- Launched: 16 July 2008

Links
- Website: www.dctv.ie

Availability

Terrestrial
- Saorview: Not available

Dublin Community Television (DCTV) is a not-for-profit co-operative television station in Ireland. It broadcasts from the country's capital, Dublin. The channel launched on 16 July 2008. It shut down 2013 - 2014 due to lack of funding, but came back on the air in 2015.

The launch was attended by Minister Eamon Ryan, Department of Communications, Energy & Natural Resources. DCTV is Ireland's only co-operatively run TV channel, and Dublin's only community TV station. It has offices in Temple Bar and The Digital Hub in Dublin.

The channel broadcasts on television as well as online services such as YouTube and Vimeo.

== Production and programming ==
DCTV is a member's co-operative. DCTV is funded by membership fees, alongside local and national government funding, and community organisations. The station does not run advertising.

Programs for DCTV are created and produced by sources which include:

- Not-for-profit TV production companies, such as NEAR TV Productions in Coolock.
- Other DCTV member organizations, such as AONTAS (adult education), Cultivate (sustainable living), Project (arts); NALA (adult literacy).
- Individual members of DCTV.

It provides training for its members in television production. Its own productions are produced under a Creative Commons license that allows non-profit use, subject to recognition of source. In 2011 during the Post-2008 Irish economic downturn Dublin CTV opened up production facilities in disused shopfronts for unemployed locals and students to create media for digital broadcast.

The channel airs features and shorts (both documentary and drama), cookery programs, adult literacy programmes, activist and college films, community programming, films by young/emerging film-makers and sports (with an emphasis on minority sports).

The station also shows international material such as Democracy Now!

In 2012 as part of the local Occupy movement DCTV broadcast a series of local lectures relating to "radical movements in Irish history".
