= Heathers (band) =

Irish indie pop band

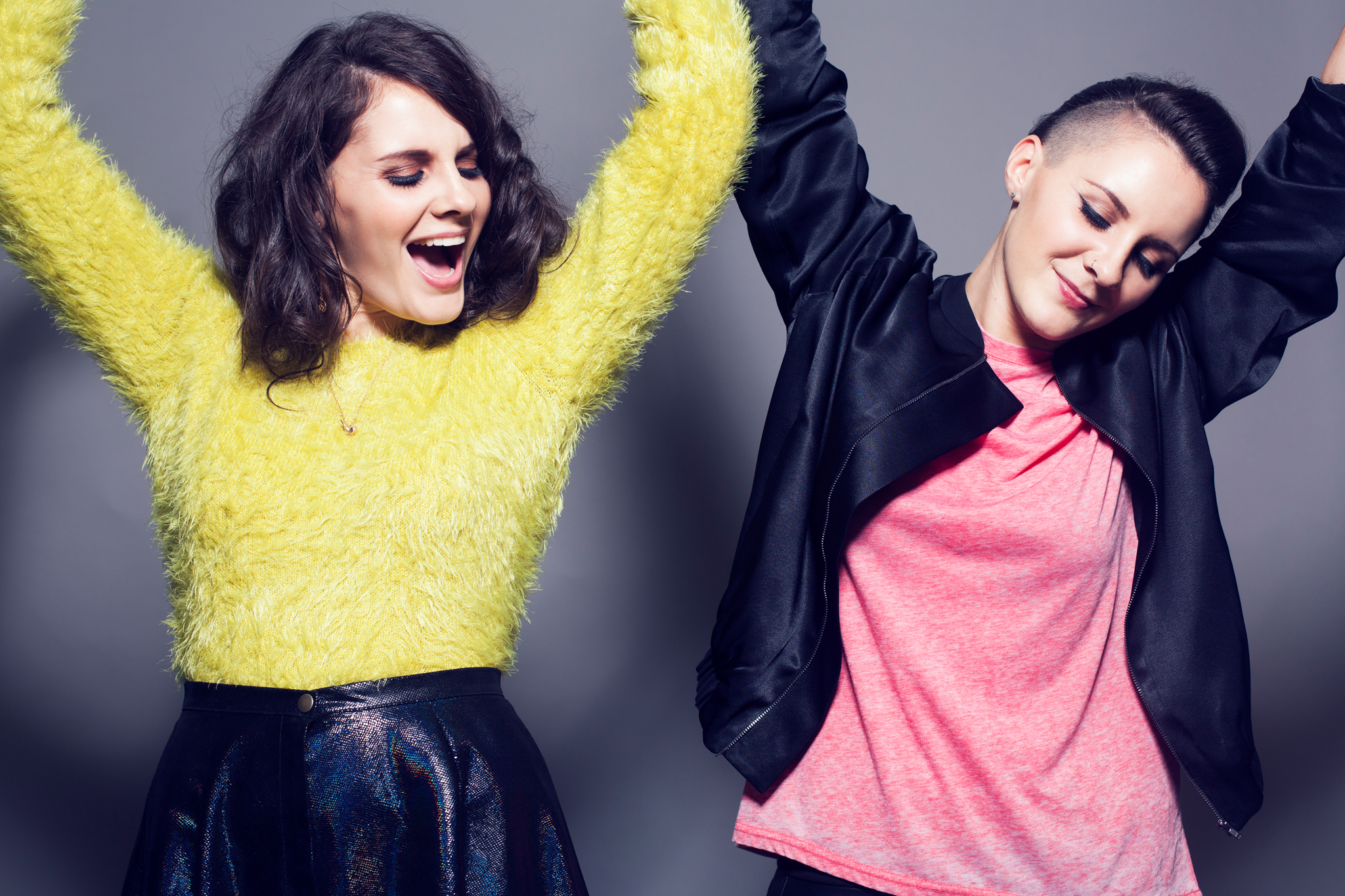
- Twin sister pop-duo Louise & Ellie Macnamara (Heathers)

Background information
- Origin: Dublin, Ireland
- Genres: Alternative; Acoustic; Pop
- Years active: 2007 – present
- Label: Aunthill Records
- Members: Ellie Macnamara; Louise Macnamara
- Website: heathersmusic.net

Heathers are an indie pop act formed in 2007 in Dublin, Ireland by twin sisters Ellie and Louise Macnamara. They began writing music together in 2007 and in February 2008 recorded their debut album Here, Not There while preparing for their Leaving Certificate. The album was recorded in The Hive Studios in Kilcoole by Eoin Whitfield in a joint release between Irish Label Hide Away Records and US label Plan-It-X Records. The lead track from the album, "Remember When", was used by the Irish Tourist Board in a major advertising campaign subsequently leading to the re-release of the album though Warner Music Ireland.

In 2013, they provided vocals for Enemies' song "Nighthawk", which is included in the band's album, Embark, Embrace.

Heathers' second album, Kingdom, was an Irish Choice Music Prize nominated album and released in 2014 through Sony Music (Canada / US) and Warner Music (Europe / Asia). The lead single from the album "Forget Me Knots" (It's Alright Not To Feel Ok)", became a much used anthem in a number of mental health awareness campaigns in Ireland and internationally.

Heathers 2016 releases included the singles, "November" and "Call Home".

== Members ==
- Ellie Macnamara – Vocals
- Louise Macnamara – Vocals, Guitar, Synths

== Discography ==
=== Studio albums ===
Year	Album detail	Peak chart positions
Year	Album detail	IRL
2008	Here, Not There: Released: 20 May 2008; Label: Aunthill Records; Formats: CD, Download	34
2012	Kingdom: Released: February 2012; Label: Aunthill Records, Warner Music Ireland; Formats: CD, Download, Vinyl	8

=== Singles ===
Year	Title	Peak chart positions	Album
Year	Title	IRL	Album
2010	"Remember When"	11	Here Not There
2010	"Reading in the Dark"	—	Here Not There
2012	"Forget Me Knots"	25	Kingdom
2013	"Waiter"	—	Kingdom
2016	"November"	—	Non-album singles
2016	"Call Home"	—	Non-album singles
2017	"Midnight Train"		Non-album singles

=== Split albums ===
Year	Album details
2009	Tour CD: With: Ghost Mice; Label: Plan-It-X Records; Formats: CD, Download

== Touring ==
Heathers have toured extensively in Ireland, Canada, the US, and Germany and have also toured for a short period in Malaysia.

They have performed in numerous festivals internationally including CMJ New York, SXSW Austin, Canadian Music Week & Electric Picnic Festival Ireland.

Heathers supported Paolo Nutini at Belsonic in Belfast, Northern Ireland on Wednesday 18 August 2010.
