= The Max Levine Ensemble =

American punk band

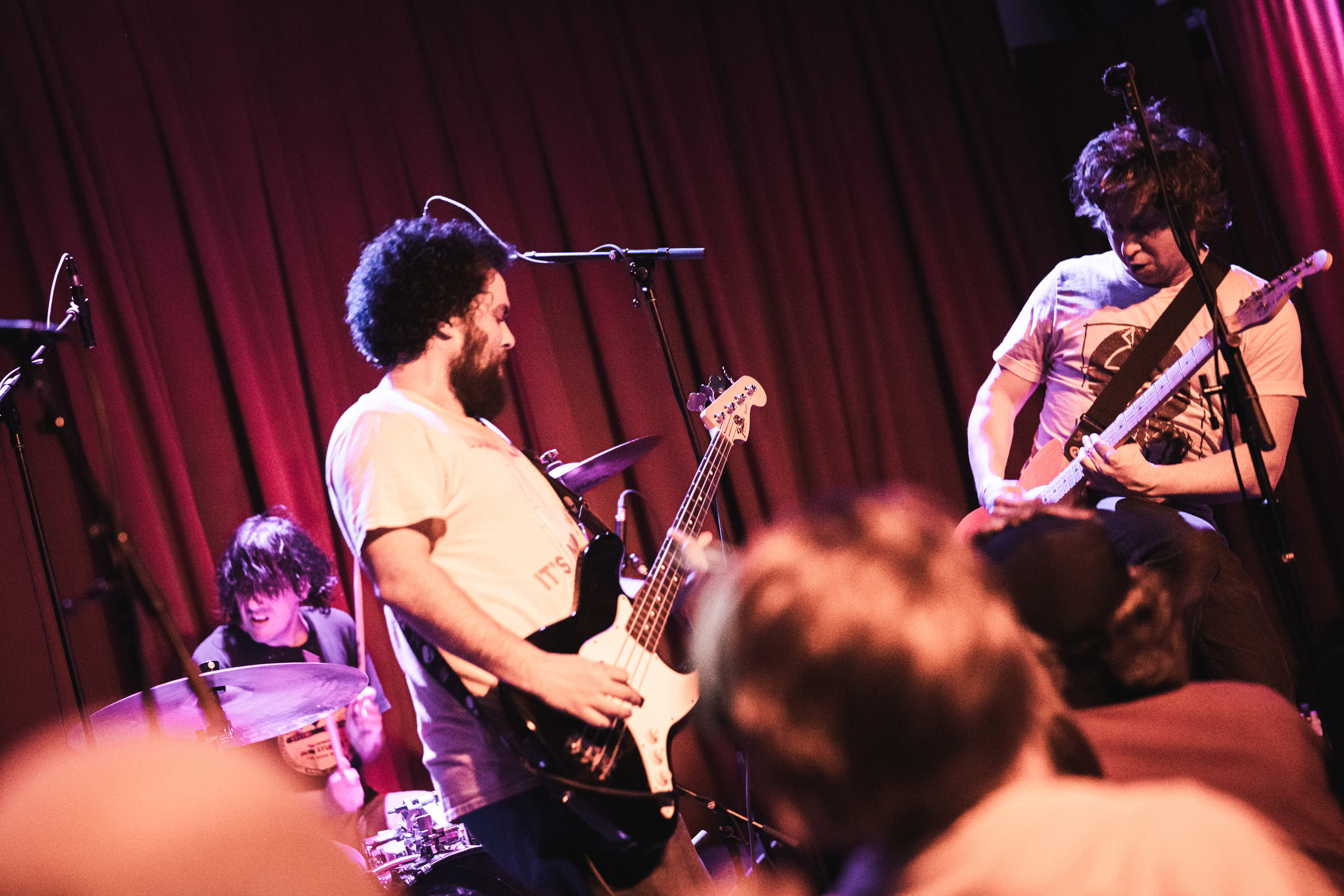
- The Max Levine Ensemble playing their 25th anniversary show in Washington, DC

Background information
- Origin: Washington, D.C.
- Genres: Pop punk, power pop, Punk rock
- Labels: Plan-It-X Records, Rumbletowne Records, Lame-O Records, Asian Man Records
- Members: David Combs; Ben Epstein; Nick Popovici
- Website: http://tmle.terrorware.com

The Max Levine Ensemble is an American DIY punk band from the Washington, D.C., metropolitan area. They play punk rock with various pop influences, and often have politically conscious lyrics. They used to have a rotating band roster that changed from tour to tour depending upon who could go. Though at one point they played regularly with 5-7 members, they generally play now as a three piece power trio consisting of David Combs, Ben Epstein, and Nick Popovici.

== History ==
The band was formed in 2000 when David Combs met Max Levine while attending highschool at the Charles E. Smith Jewish Day School. Max introduced David to various punk rock bands such as Propagandhi, Fugazi, and the Clash, as well as introducing him to radical politics. Combs had been playing in a ska band, and when Max asked him to cover punk rock songs in his ska band he thought it was inappropriate for the genre. Instead he invited several of his friends to start a new band that would play full sets of cover songs to be requested by Max Levine. They played their first show at a high school band show case in December 2000. The set consisted of 5 cover songs and 2 originals. From then on the band focused on original material, but kept the name The Max Levine Ensemble in homage to their friend.

Since then the band grew and developed, incorporating various influences into their pop punk sound. They self-released two full length CD-Rs in 2001 and 2002 that were later released together on Fight The Octopus records as "Chach, Cops, and Donuts." In 2003 they released their third full length, "How to Build an Intergalactic Time Machine" recorded with Hugh McElroy of the Black Eyes. The band tours the United States. Notably they joined up with Operation: Cliff Clavin for their reunion tour and a split 7-inch in 2004, and toured as part of the Plan-It-X Records bus tour in 2005. In 2005 a split 7-inch with The Spirit Animals was released.

In January 2008, the band released their fourth full-length album "OK Smartypants" on CD from Plan-It-X, audio cassette from Big Record Label, and on LP from No Breaks Records.

In July 2008, the band was maligned by Ben Weasel the Screeching Weasel frontman on his radio show, "Weasel Radio." In 2009 the band took their revenge by releasing a "split" 7-inch that appeared falsely to be a collaboration with Ben Weasel, featuring clips from the radio show on the B side and songs like "Ben Weasel Thinks We Suck" on the A side.

In December 2009, synchronous to a five-week US-tour, the band self-released a cassette tape EP entitled "Them Steadily Depressing, Low Down Mind Messing, Post Modern Recession Blues." Later in 2010 the EP was re-released on 7-inch by Asian Man Records.

In December 2011, the band embarked on a seven-week US-tour in support of their EP, "The Elephant in the Room," released on 7-inch and cassette by Fuck You is a Seven Letter Word Records.

In November 2015, the band released their fifth full-length album "Backlash, Baby" on CD from Lame-O and on LP from Lame-O and Rumbletowne.

== Members ==
=== Currently active members ===
- David Combs (aka Spoonboy) - guitar, vocals
- Ben Epstein (aka Bepstein) - bass, vocals, guitar (formerly)
- Nick Popovici - drums, bass (formerly)

=== Currently inactive members ===
- Alex Mazer - trumpet, vocals
- Adam Soffrin - drums
- Mat Lewis - drums, vocals
- Ari "Rejy" Jacobovits - bass
- DJ Michael Barticus - turntable
- Mr. Himmelsbach - keyboard, harmonica
- Matt Tobey - drums, guitar
- Max Levine - "Frontman extraordinaire"

== Discography ==
=== Albums ===
- Songs That Make You Wanna Jump up, Run Outside, Grab a Donut From a Cop and Yell Chach Rules!!! - Self-Released, CD-R (2001)
- ...Goes to Jail for Stealing a Donut from a Cop - Self-Released, CD-R (2002)
- How to Build an Intergalactic Time Travel Machine - Fight the Octopus Records, CD (2003)
- Chach, Cops and Donuts Discography - Fight the Octopus Records, CD (2004)
- OK Smartypants CD - Plan-it-X Records, CD / Big Record Label, Tape / No Breaks Records, LP (2008)
- Ben Weasel - Fuck You is a Seven Letter Word Records, 7-inch (2009)
- Them Steadily Depressing, Low Down Mind Messing, Post Modern Recession Blues - Fuck You is a Seven Letter Word Records, Tape / Asian Man Records, 7-inch (2010)
- The Elephant in the Room - Fuck You is a Seven Letter Word Records, 7-inch, Tape (2011)
- Backlash, Baby - Rumbletowne Records & Lame-O Records, LP / Broken World Media, Tape (2015)

=== Split releases ===
- Split w/The Spirit Animals - Crafty Records, 7-inch (2005)
- Split w/Operation: Cliff Clavin - Plan-It-X Records, 7-inch (2005)

== See also ==
- Plan It X Records
