= Folk punk =

Fusion of folk music and punk rock

- Other names: Rogue folk (early)
- Stylistic origins: Punk rock; folk; British folk rock
- Cultural origins: Early 1980s, United Kingdom and United States

Subgenres
- Celtic punk; gypsy punk

Other topics
- Anarcho-punk; anti-folk; folk rock; cowpunk; indie folk; list of folk rock artists; DIY ethic; neofolk; folk metal

Folk punk (originally known as rogue folk) is a fusion of folk music and punk rock, particularly characterized by a folk-inspired sound blended with punk-inspired lyrics. It was popularized in the early 1980s by the Pogues in England, and by Violent Femmes in the United States. Folk punk achieved some mainstream success in that decade. In more recent years, its subgenres Celtic punk and gypsy punk have experienced some commercial success.

== Characteristics ==
Folk punk is related to and/or influenced by various styles such as Celtic punk, gypsy punk, anti-folk, and alternative country. Folk punk is also linked with DIY punk scenes, and bands often perform in house venues in addition to more traditional spaces.

Folk-punk musicians may perform their own compositions in the style of punk rock, but using additional folk instruments, such as mandolins, accordions, banjos, and/or violins. Folk punk possesses a rich history of progressive and leftist political views, involving topics like race, class, feminism, anti-fascism, animal rights, queerness, and anarchism.

== History ==
=== Precursors ===
The earliest known relationship between rebellious folk music and the ethos that would later define punk rock is that of Woody Guthrie, often known as a precursor to the punk ethos, who sung songs about anti-fascism and the conditions faced by working-class people, starting in the 1930s. In the 1960s, New York's folk music revival scene spearheaded by artists like Bob Dylan would birth other early precursors to folk punk which included underground proto-punk artists like David Peel, the Godz, the Holy Modal Rounders and the Fugs whose style of crude vulgar folk music would later prove influential to anti-folk artists like Jeffrey Lewis.

=== 1970s ===
In 1977 London-born singer-songwriter Patrik Fitzgerald released his first EP titled Safety-Pin Stuck in My Heart which was subtitled "a love song for punk music". The titular song from the EP still remains Fitzgerald's most famous work and acted as one of the pioneering releases for folk punk by combining punk rock imagery with acoustic guitar and vocals.

=== 1980s ===
Formed in Milwaukee in 1981, Violent Femmes was one of the first and most commercially successful bands to fuse punk and folk, though much of their influence came more from early art rock acts like the Velvet Underground. During the 1980s other punk and hardcore bands would pepper their albums with acoustic tracks or inject folksier sounds, notably the Dead Milkmen and Articles of Faith. An influential album was the punk-inflected folk-country album released in 1984 when psychedelic hardcore band the Meat Puppets switched their style for their seminal release Meat Puppets II.

In the UK, the fusion of folk and punk was pioneered by the London-based Irish band the Pogues, formed in 1982, whose mixture of original songs and covers of established folk singers, many performed in a punk style, led to three top ten albums in the UK, a number two single in "Fairytale of New York" (1987) with Kirsty McColl, and a string of top ten singles and albums in Ireland. The Pogues' lead singer Shane MacGowan had played in London punk outfit the Nips, originally known as the Nipple Erectors.

The pioneers of a more distinctively English brand of folk punk were the Men They Couldn't Hang, founded in 1984. Also important was the Oysterband, who developed from playing English Céilidh music with a fast and harder rock sound from around 1986. The Levellers, founded in 1988, made less use of traditional melodies but more use of acoustic instruments, including violins. Several other prominent members of the English punk scene in the early 1980s were also experimenting with folk influences. Early demos by Chumbawamba feature the accordion and the trumpet, though it would take them over 20 years to transition into a full-fledged folk act. Attila the Stockbroker began entertaining punk audiences accompanied by mandola in 1986, and is still performing. Probably the most successful figure associated with English 1980s folk punk is singer-songwriter Billy Bragg, who enjoyed a series of hits in the 1980s and became a distinct influence on later folk punk acts.

=== 1990s ===
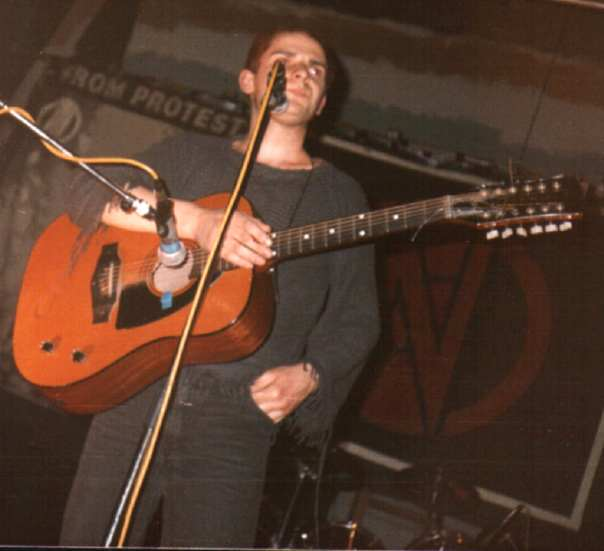
Chumbawamba vocalist Danbert Nobacon pictured playing live at the University of Leeds, 1986, supporting Conflict.

The early nineties saw a general lull of interest in folk-influenced punk, but there were a few acts touring. Formed in 1990, Austin-based experimental bluegrass band Bad Livers is one example, though the band used punk more as a cultural reference point than a musical one, often appearing wearing Misfits shirts and occasionally covering Iggy Pop's "Lust for Life".

1994 saw the creation of Plan-It-X Records. which would later go on to release some of the most quintessential folk punk acts of the late 90s/early 2000s and have a large influence on the genre.

Another genre-defining act, the Moldy Peaches formed in 1994 featuring Adam Green and Kimya Dawson. singing and playing acoustic guitars. The band labeled themselves as Anti-Folk.

Formed in 1995, the World/Inferno Friendship Society is a large ensemble that came to be influential in the later New York Gypsy Punk scene. They combined elements of Cabaret, Punk, and Klezmer into their grandiose and theatrical performances.

At the close of the 1990s, Celtic punk had a revival as bands like Dropkick Murphys, Flogging Molly, Greenland Whalefishers, and the Real McKenzies started to experience a wider commercial notice. This wave of bands, who often mixed Pogues-derived sounds with those of street punk bands like Cockney Rejects, spawned imitators worldwide.

=== 2000s ===
In the early 2000s, a Plan-It-X Records sound, heavily influenced by underground 1990s pop punk and classic DIY ethic began to take shape. For many in the punk community, the record label has become synonymous with folk punk, though they have also released electric acts with little or no folk influence. At the same time in New York a Gypsy Punk sound began to coalesce around Gogol Bordello, Golem, Insomniac Folklore, and other groups. These bands took eastern European instrumentation and fused it with the rhythms of punk, ska, and rock. Many of these bands adopted a very recognizable aesthetic influenced by campy references to Soviet art, burlesque aesthetics, and the classic punk style of the Clash. Gogol Bordello, in particular, achieved a degree of mainstream success.

In the Northeastern US, yet another community was emerging around the band Mischief Brew and Fistolo Records. These acts merged the DIY punk underground with '60s radical folk in the vein of Phil Ochs and contemporary anarchist folk musicians like David Rovics. Notable artists from the Northeast at this time were punk/appalachian hybrids the Can Kickers, and influential singer/songwriter Pat the Bunny under the name Johnny Hobo and the Freight Trains. Pat later went on to form Wingnut Dishwashers Union in the late 2000s. He is considered by many to be a highly definitive folk punk artist.

During this period, the genre gained increased attention as Against Me! from Gainesville, Florida achieved mainstream success; however, this coincided with a shift away from their original folk sound.

In the mid-2000s, the west coast began to produce its own DIY scene of folk punk artists with a different sound, connected with Santa Cruz's Blackbird Raum who feature a completely acoustic lineup based entirely around traditional instruments, but with fast punk rhythms and bleak, political lyrics influenced by crust punk. They are closely associated with the all-acoustic hardcore band Hail Seizures and the Northwest Folklife festival folk-punk stage. These west coast bands play acoustically in order to busk. This time also hosted the rise of folk punk created in the Southwest United States. AJJ began in 2004 in Phoenix, AZ drawing inspiration from and collaborating with artists around the country.

In 2004, the Moldy Peaches split up and Kimya Dawson began releasing solo work. In 2007, her music was featured extensively in the soundtrack for the film Juno. This soundtrack went on to win a Grammy for Best Compilation Soundtrack in 2009.

In 2006, Brian Sella and Mat Uychich formed the Front Bottoms. Their first two albums, I Hate My Friends and My Grandma vs. Pneumonia, as well as their first EP, Brothers Can't Be Friends, featured them as well as Mat's brother, also named Brian.

=== 2010s and 2020s ===
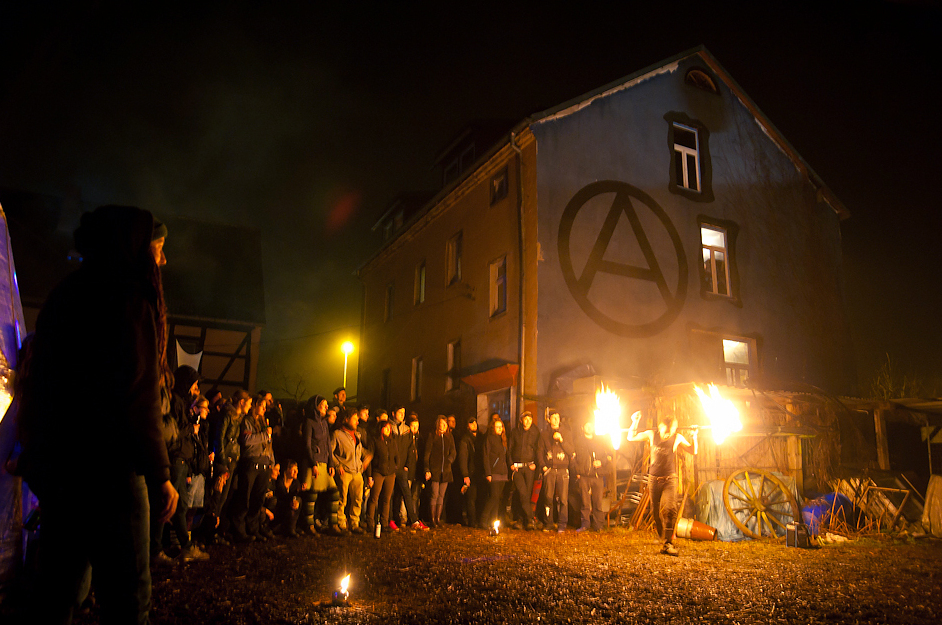
Anarchist folk punk festival and demonstration

In 2011, Pat the Bunny and others started Ramshackle Glory in Tucson, Arizona. This turned out to be his last larger collaborative project, as in 2016, revered by many as an integral part of the community, he announced his retirement from folk punk altogether. He cited a dramatic change in his viewpoints, shifting away from anarchism in politics and punk music.

2016 saw also the death of Erik Petersen, member and founder of Mischief Brew, and the subsequent groups disbanding.

One of the most notable disruptions within the community occurred in 2017 when Chris Clavin, founder of Plan-It-X Records and member of several bands including Ghost Mice, was accused of sexual misconduct by several individuals. While he was defended by some close to him, bands he has collaborated with including Kimya Dawson, AJJ, Waxahatchee, Spoonboy, and Ramshackle Glory have condemned his actions, left Plan-It-X Records, and removed their work from future printings of split albums.

The continued rise in popularity of several folk-punk acts during this decade was aided by the emergence and spread of musical videos on websites like YouTube. Some of these videos gained widespread recognition, as exemplified by Days N' Daze's Misanthropic Drunken Loner, reaching well past 8 million views to date. Notably, three channels have emerged over the years, featuring folk punk acts in various formats: A Fistful of Vinyl is a Los Angeles radio show with live sessions every Thursday night on KXLU 88.9 FM. AFoV releases videos of their studio sessions since 2012 periodically on YouTube. Shibby Pictures is a YouTube channel that features mostly indie music videos, short movies and documentaries since about 2010.

The songwriting of Matt Pless's has been compared to that of Bob Dylan. In 2014 Bostonian working-class folk-punker Bryan McPherson got banned by Disney from playing Anaheim's House of Blues, due to his political lyrics.

== Celtic punk ==
The Pogues' style of punked-up Irish music spawned and influenced a number of Celtic punk bands, including Nyah Fearties from Scotland, and Australia's Roaring Jack. It has been particularly popular in the US and Canada, where there are large communities descended from Irish and Scottish immigrants. From the US this includes Irish-influenced bands Flogging Molly, the Tossers, Dropkick Murphys, Street Dogs, the Young Dubliners, Black 47, the Killdares, Flatfoot 56, and Jackdaw, and Scottish bands such as Seven Nations. From Canada come the Dreadnoughts, the Real McKenzies and the Mahones; from Australia, the Rumjacks, Roaring Jack and Mutiny; Catgut Mary; from the UK, Neck (featuring a former member of Shane MacGowan's post-Pogues band, the Popes) and Ferocious Dog; from Germany, Fiddler's Green; from the Czech Republic, Pipes And Pints; and from Norway, Greenland Whalefishers. These groups were influenced by American forms of music, and sometimes contained members with no Celtic ancestry and had lyrics sung in English.

== See also ==
- Cowpunk
- Protest song
