= Plan-It-X Records =

American independent record label

- Founded: 1994
- Founder: Chris Johnston, Sam Dorsett
- Distributor: No Idea Records
- Genre: Punk rock, pop punk, folk punk, folk
- Country of origin: U.S.
- Location: Bloomington, Indiana

Plan-It-X Records (PIX) was an independent record label. Originally based in Georgetown, Indiana, PIX was based in Bloomington, Indiana following brief stints in Olympia, Washington, Gainesville, Florida, and Cairo, Illinois. The label released folk punk and pop punk music, including Against Me!'s Crime As Forgiven By, other releases include albums by This Bike Is a Pipe Bomb, Defiance, Ohio, Ghost Mice, Japanther, The Bananas, Operation: Cliff Clavin, and Antsy Pants and Fifteen.

== History ==
Founded in 1994 by Samantha Jane Dorsett and Chris Clavin, Plan-It-X held a DIY punk ethic. The label sold all CDs for five dollars or less. PIX's slogan reads: "If it ain't cheap, it ain't punk". PIX attempted to demonstrate that the practices of major record labels do not need to be duplicated by independent record labels in order to be successful. They supported other small labels and encourage others to do so as well (and even go as far as to suggest starting your own label). Clavin formerly played in the iconic folk punk band Ghost Mice and currently records albums and performs under the name Captain Chaos. Clavin was one of the founders of folk punk music and is a former band member of Operation: Cliff Clavin, The Devil Is Electric, The Ted Dancin' Machine, Peanucle, The Sissies, Tooth Soup and The Jammy Dodgers.

Beyond the release of musical albums, Plan-It-X has released a book by author Greg Wells (Complete Control: An Anthology 1997-2005), the zine My Friend Bubby, as well as a DVD featuring live performances of bands filmed during Plan-It-X Fest 2004 (see below). A documentary was released in 2010, put together from footage shot across the week of the 2006 Plan-It-X Fest.

Clavin announced in 2016 that Plan-It-X would cease operations due to a variety of reasons, including the financial strain, and closed for good in 2018.

== Plan-It-X Fest ==
In 2004 Plan-It-X Records celebrated its 10-year anniversary with a three-day festival in Bloomington, Indiana. A large portion of the bands involved with the label performed throughout the three-day event.

With the success of the 2004 fest, Plan-It-X decided to take the festival on the road the following year in 2005 with a number of their bands in a school bus. The school bus toured throughout the Eastern and Midwestern United States.

2006 saw the third Plan-It-X fest return to Bloomington as a six-day "Punk Rock Summer Camp," with bands playing every night and workshops and other activities throughout the afternoon. Like the two previous fests, 2006's fest raised money for charity. This year a total of $8,200 was split amongst three different charities.

2011 saw the fourth Plan-It-X Fest. It took place on June 24, 25, and 26 in Bloomington, Indiana. Like previous fests, this one was a benefit for several grassroots organizations. It also marked the release of PIX99, a book based on founder Samantha Dorsett's life.

The 5th Plan-It-X Fest happened in 2012.

The 6th Plan-It-X Fest took place in 2014 in Spencer, IN.

The 7th and final Plan-It-X Fest took place in Spencer, IN from July 22 to the 24th, 2016. This festival was filmed for a short YouTube documentary by Punk With A Camera entitled "And One For Good Luck - The Last Plan-It-X Fest". Artists performing included Ramshackle Glory, Ghost Mice, Terror Pigeon, The Wild, Pioneers Press author Adam Gnade, Super Famicom, Erin Tobey, Your Heart Breaks and many more.

== Bands and artists ==
The following is an alphabetized list of artists that have worked with Plan-It-X to release projects on the label. Some of these bands overlap with Plan-It-X South bands (see below regarding PIX South).

- Abe Froman
- Against Me!
- AJJ
- Andrew Lips
- Antsy Pants
- The Bananas
- The Blank Fight
- Best Friends Forever
- Beyond Things
- Brook Pridemore
- Captain Chaos
- Carrie Nations
- The Connie Dungs
- The Dauntless Elite
- Dave Dean's Musical Forklift
- Dead Bird
- Defiance, Ohio
- Delay
- The Devil Is Electric
- Disarm
- Dogbreth
- The Door-Keys
- Emperor X
- Eric Ayotte
- Erin Tobey
- Fifteen
- The Four Eyes
- The Future Virgins
- Ghost Mice
- Greg Wells
- Halo Fauna
- Heathers
- Henry Rollins and the Sweater Band
- I Like Japanese Hardcore
- Imperial Can
- Instinct
- James Black
- Japanther
- Kyle Hall
- Latchkey Kids
- Lava Lava
- Left Out
- Los Gatos Negros
- Lycka Till
- Madeline Adams
- Madeline Ava
- Matty Pop Chart
- The Max Levine Ensemble
- Michael Jumpshot Touchdown Pass
- Mitch the Champ
- One Reason
- ONSIND
- Operation: Cliff Clavin
- Pat the Bunny
- Paul Baribeau
- Peanucle
- Punkin Pie
- Ramshackle Glory
- Rosa
- Russ Substance
- Sara Cilantro
- Saw Wheel
- Sexy
- Shotwell
- The Sissies
- Soophie Nun Squad
- Spoonboy
- Stressface
- Street Eaters
- Super Bobby
- The Taxpayers
- The Ted Dancin' Machine
- The Tiger
- This Bike Is a Pipe Bomb
- Watercolor Paintings
- Waxahatchee
- Whiskey Smile!
- Will Power
- Your Heart Breaks

== Plan-It-X South ==
=== Overview ===
Plan-It-X South is a part of the main Plan-It-X label, but is run by Teddy Helmick of This Bike Is a Pipe Bomb. Plan-It-X carries all of the Plan-It-X South releases in their catalog.

PIX South shares the same DIY punk ethic of its mother label.

=== PIX South Bands ===
- ADD/C
- Friday Knight
- The Future Virgins
- The Hidden Spots
- Landlord
- PantyShanty
- Rymodee
- Sexy
- Stressface
- This Bike Is a Pipe Bomb

== See also ==
- List of record labels
