= Skankin' Pickle Live =

Live album by Skankin' Pickle
- Released: November 30, 1995
- Recorded: March and September 1994
- Genre: Ska punk, punk rock
- Length: 42:07
- Label: Dill Records
- Producer: Skankin' Pickle

Skankin' Pickle chronology
| Sing Along With Skankin' Pickle (1994) | Skankin' Pickle Live (1995) | The Green Album (1996) |

Skankin' Pickle Live is a live album by American ska punk band Skankin' Pickle, released on Dill Records in 1995.

Tracks 1–2 were recorded at 924 Gilman Street in Berkeley, California on September 2, 1994. Tracks 3–15 were recorded at The Phoenix Theater in Petaluma, California on March 3, 1994.

Skankin' Pickle Live features five bonus tracks from two other artists on the Dill Records roster: three tracks from Hawaiian ska/reggae band The Tantra Monsters, which later appeared on their self-titled 1996 album, and two from San Francisco ska-punk band The Rudiments, "Treadmill" from the 1995 Suicide Machines split Skank for Brains, and a then-unreleased cover of The Toyes' "Smoke Two Joints" (titled "Two Joints").

== Track listing ==
All songs written by Skankin' Pickle except where otherwise noted.

1. "Hussein Skank" – 3:23
2. "Fakin' Jamaican" (Steve Devlin) – 2:11
3. "David Duke is Running 4 President" – 1:48
4. "Pabu Boy" – 1:19
5. "Asian Man" – 3:14
6. "Rotten Banana Legs" – 2:56
7. "I Missed The Bus" – 2:28
8. "I'm In Love With A Girl Name Spike" – 1:57
9. "Thick Ass Stout" – 4:51
10. "Anxiety Attack" – 2:49
11. "Ice Cube Korea Wants A Word With You" – 1:33
12. "Margaret Cho Show" – 1:39
13. "Little Brown Jug" (Joseph Winner) – 1:21
14. "Toothless & Grey" – 3:49
15. "Fights" – 3:21
16. Bonus track: "Beans and Rice" by the Tantra Monsters – 6:25
17. Bonus track: "Working Man" by the Tantra Monsters – 3:36
18. Bonus track: "Traffic" by the Tantra Monsters – 5:46
19. Dill Records advertisement – 0:34
20. Bonus track: "Treadmill" by The Rudiments – 3:40
21. Bonus track: "Two Joints" by The Rudiments – 5:40

== Personnel ==
- Lynette Knackstedt - guitar, vocals, lead vocals on tracks 6 and 14
- Gerry Lundquist - slide trombone, vocals
- Ian Miller - bass guitar, vocals
- Lars Nylander - valve trombone, vocals
- Mike "Bruce Lee" Park - saxophone, vocals, lead vocals on tracks 1–5, 7, 8, 10–12 and 15
- Chuck Phelps - drums
