= Pots and Shots =

Studio album by Potshot
- Released: October 14, 1997
- Genre: Ska-punk; Third wave ska
- Label: Asian Man Records
- Producer: Mike Park

Potshot chronology
Pots and Shots (1997)	Rock 'n' Roll (1999)

Professional ratings
Review scores
Source	Rating
Allmusic	link

Pots and Shots is the debut album of J-ska band Potshot. The album was released in the United States by Asian Man Records in 1997.

== Tracks ==
1. We Are Potshot 1:06
2. Someone to Lean On 2:26
3. Radio 1:49
4. Handle 2:35
5. Time 2:49
6. Since Yesterday 1:46
7. Anytime 2:33
8. Clear 2:35
9. Under the Blue Sky 3:00
10. Tears of a Clown 1:06
11. In Hi-Fi 2:27
12. Not Worth Your While But Worth My Life 2:49
13. Mexico 3:15
14. Change 3:40
