= On a Mission (Buck-O-Nine album) =

Compilation album by Buck-O-Nine
- Released: 2001
- Recorded: 1994–1995
- Genre: Ska punk
- Label: Moon Ska Europe
- Producer: Buck-O-Nine

Buck-O-Nine chronology
Hellos & Goodbyes (2000)	On a Mission (2001)	Sustain (2007)

On a Mission was released in Europe in 2001 to coincide with a Buck-O-Nine tour of the UK. It features tracks from Songs in the Key of Bree, Barfly and Water in My Head. It was rated three stars by AllMusic.

== Track listing ==
1. "On a Mission" [Video Track]
2. "Calling in Sick"
3. "Barfly"
4. "Water in My Head"
5. "Pass the Dutchie"
6. "More Than Your Eyes Can See"
7. "Poor Boy"
8. "Dr Kitch"
9. "Few Too Many"
10. "Junior"
11. "Milk"
12. "Positively Shelby"
13. "Full Metal Bree"
14. "Sound System"
15. "True or False"

== Credits ==
=== Performance ===
- Jon Pebsworth - Vocals
- Jonas Kleiner - Guitar
- Dan Albert - Trombone
- Anthony Curry - Trumpet
- Craig Yarnold - Alto Sax
- Scott Kennerly - Bass
- Steve Bauer - Drums

=== Production ===
- Track 1 (video) recorded in Boston, MA
- Tracks 1–7, 9, 10, 13–15 recorded at DoubleTime Studios by Jeff Forrest
- Tracks 3, 8, 11, 12 recorded at Paramount Studio, Hollywood, CA
- Cover Artwork: Jonas Kleiner
