= Sing Along With Skankin' Pickle =

Studio album by Skankin' Pickle
- Released: 1994; February 23, 1996 (Dr. Strange); December 14, 1999 (Asian Man)
- Genre: Ska punk, punk rock, third wave ska
- Length: 42:07
- Label: Dill Records, Asian Man Records, Dr. Strange Records
- Producer: Ron Rigler, Skankin' Pickle

Skankin' Pickle chronology
| Skankin' Pickle Fever (1992) | Sing Along With Skankin' Pickle (1994) | Skankin' Pickle Live (1995) |

Professional ratings
Review scores
| Source | Rating |
|---|---|
| AllMusic | 4/5 stars |

Sing Along With Skankin' Pickle is the third studio album by the American ska punk band Skankin' Pickle. It was released on Dill Records in 1994. Four of the bandmembers contributed to the songwriting. The band supported the album with a North American tour.

The album was re-issued on Asian Man Records in 1999.

== Track list ==
1. "Rotten Banana Legs" (Knackstedt) – 3:03
2. "$13,000 Is A Lot Of Food!" (Park) – 1:59
3. "Turning Japanese" (The Vapors) – 3:12
4. "Onyonghasayo" (Park) – 1:31
5. "Take A Look" (Knackstedt) – 2:05
6. "I'm In Love With A Girl Named Spike" (Park) – 1:35
7. "Smorgasborgnine" (Nylander) – 2:03
8. "Go Home Now" (Park) – 2:08
9. "Thick Ass Stout" (Nylander) – 4:53
10. "20 Nothing" (Miller) – 3:59
11. "It's Margaret Cho" (Park) – 1:26
12. "Hate" (Park) – 1:54
13. "As Close As You Think" (Nylander/Knackstedt) – 2:08
14. "Pabu Boy" (Park) – 1:15
15. "Watch Your Tone" (Phelps/Knackstedt) – 7:15
16. Hidden track – 1:48

== Personnel ==
- Lynette Knackstedt - guitar, vocals, lead vocals on tracks 1, 5, 8 and 15
- Gerry "Hulk Hogan" Lundquist - slide trombone, vocals
- Chuck Phelps - drums
- Ian "Guru" Miller - bass, vocals, lead vocals on track 10
- Lars Nylander - valve trombone, vocals, lead vocals on tracks 7, 12 and 13
- Mike "Bruce Lee" Park - saxophone, vocals, lead vocals on tracks 2, 3, 4, 6, 8, 11 and 14

=== Additional musicians ===
- Darren Fletcher - keyboards on track 11
- "Smokin'" Neal Okin - trumpet on tracks 5, 7, 9 and 13

=== Production ===
- Engineered by Oscar Autie
- Recorded at UOS $ Studios
- Mixed at Different Fur Studios
