= The Green Album (Skankin' Pickle album) =

Studio album by Skankin' Pickle
- Released: August 27, 1996
- Recorded: January 27–29, 1996; April 25, 1996
- Genre: Ska punk, punk rock, third wave ska
- Length: 47:41
- Label: Dr. Strange Records
- Producer: Ron Rigler, Skankin' Pickle

Skankin' Pickle chronology
| Skankin' Pickle Live (1995) | The Green Album (1996) |

Professional ratings
Review scores
| Source | Rating |
|---|---|
| Allmusic | 3/5 stars |
| Punknews.org | 4/5 stars |

The Green Album is the fourth and final studio album by American ska punk band Skankin' Pickle, released in 1996 on Dr. Strange Records.

Commissioned and released by Dr. Strange Records (rather than Skankin' Pickle's own label Dill Records), The Green Album was originally intended to be a six-song EP of cover songs wherein each member picked and sang a song of their choosing. Eventually the decision was made to expand the EP into a full-length, leading the band to record seven additional songs, all of which were unreleased demos dating back to as far as 1989.

According to the liner notes, The Green Album was recorded and mixed in 30 hours for the cost of $735, recorded on 8 track in the basement where trombonist Lars Nylander and members of ska punk band The Rudiments were living at the time.

Founder and vocalist Mike Park announced his departure from Skankin' Pickle in the liner notes of The Green Album, writing "The band has been such a big part of my life but I feel it is time to move on!". Skankin' Pickle continued touring following the release of The Green Album with Janitors Against Apartheid saxophonist Mike Liu in Park's place, though would ultimately go through multiple line-up changes until only Nylander and guitarist Lynette Knackstedt remained from the recorded line-up by the conclusion of a European tour in June 1997, after which the group was re-branded first as the Now and Laters and then as The 78 RPMs.

== Track listing ==
1. "Gas in My Car" (Steve Devlin) - 2:57
2. "Gates of Steel" (DEVO) - 2:49
3. "Cup Flipper" (Devlin) - 3:26
4. "Start Today" (Gorilla Biscuits) - 1:57
5. "Rest of the World" (Devlin) - 1:31
6. "Don't Care" (Klark Kent) - 1:55
7. "My Hair" (Knackstedt) - 3:05
8. "Pay to Cum" (Bad Brains) - 1:32
9. "Ties That Bind" (Devlin) - 1:31
10. "Special Brew" (Bad Manners) - 3:11
11. "Make a Change" (Park) - 2:09
12. "Sleep" (Park) - 1:17
13. "Violent Love" (Willie Dixon, based on Oingo Boingo's version) - 2:59
14. Hidden track - 15:25

=== Song notes ===
- The bridge of "Cup Flipper" includes a medley of parts of "Summer Nights", "Working in the Coal Mine" and "Can't Get Enough of You Baby".
- The hidden track consists of three untitled songs separated between bouts of silence, a noise rock outtake and two solo acoustic songs each by Park and Knackstedt.

== Personnel ==
- Lynette Knackstedt - guitar, vocals, lead vocals on tracks 2 and 7
- Michael "Bruce Lee" Park - saxophone, vocals, lead vocals on tracks 1, 5, 10, 11 and 12
- Gerry "Lungs" Lundquist - slide trombone, vocals, lead vocals on track 8
- Lars Nylander - valve trombone, vocals, lead vocals on tracks 3, 9 and 13
- Chuck Phelps - drums, lead vocals on track 6
- Ian Miller - bass guitar, vocals, lead vocals on track 4
