= Tuesday (band) =

American punk and emo band

- Origin: Chicago, Illinois, United States
- Genres: Emo, Punk
- Years active: 1996–1999
- Label: 1133, Asian Man
- Spinoff of: Slapstick
- Past members: Dan Andriano; Matt Stamps; Rob Kellenberger; Tyler Wisemen

Tuesday was a punk and emo band formed by three ex-members of Chicago ska punk band Slapstick after the latter's breakup in 1996. The band's initial line-up consisted of Dan Andriano (bass/vocals), Matt Stamps (guitar), and Rob Kellenberger (drums/vocals). They released a demo on 1133 in 1996, before releasing an EP, titled Early Summer, on Asian Man Records in 1997. Later that same year, they released their first and only album, Freewheelin. While recording this album in California, the members of Tuesday also served as the backing band for Mike Park for the first album by The Chinkees, The Chinkees Are Coming. Also during this time, Rob and Matt were in college, and Dan found himself with extra free time. He started playing with other bands on the side including an instrumental band called Dulcet Tone, and eventually Alkaline Trio, after their original bass player Rob Doran departed. In early 1998, Tyler Wiseman from Dulcet Tone joined as a second guitarist for Tuesday to help expand the band's sound and tour in support of Freewheelin. They toured the U.S. in spring and the summer of 1998. They continued to write songs throughout this period intended for a follow-up album. With other members of the band devoting more time to family and college, and Dan enjoying success with the Alkaline Trio, Tuesday faded away as an active band sometime in 1999.

Kellenberger went on to play drums with Duvall, Colossal, and briefly for the reunited Smoking Popes. Wiseman went on to play with The Honor System and Whale|Horse.

== Discography ==
=== Studio albums ===
Date of release	Title	Label
October 28, 1997	Freewheelin	Asian Man

=== EPs ===
Date of release	Title	Label
July 15, 1997	Early Summer	Asian Man

=== Compilations ===
- Mailorder is Fun, Asian Man Records (1997) - song: "Goodbyes Have Been Said"
- Mailorder is Still Fun, Asian Man Records (1999) - song: "So Awake"
- Mailorder For the Masses, Asian Man Records (2000) - song: "Another Disco Party"
- Living Tomorrow Today: A Benefit for Ty Cambra, Asian Man Records (2001) - song: "Everybody Was in Love"
