= Skasucks =

South Korean ska punk band

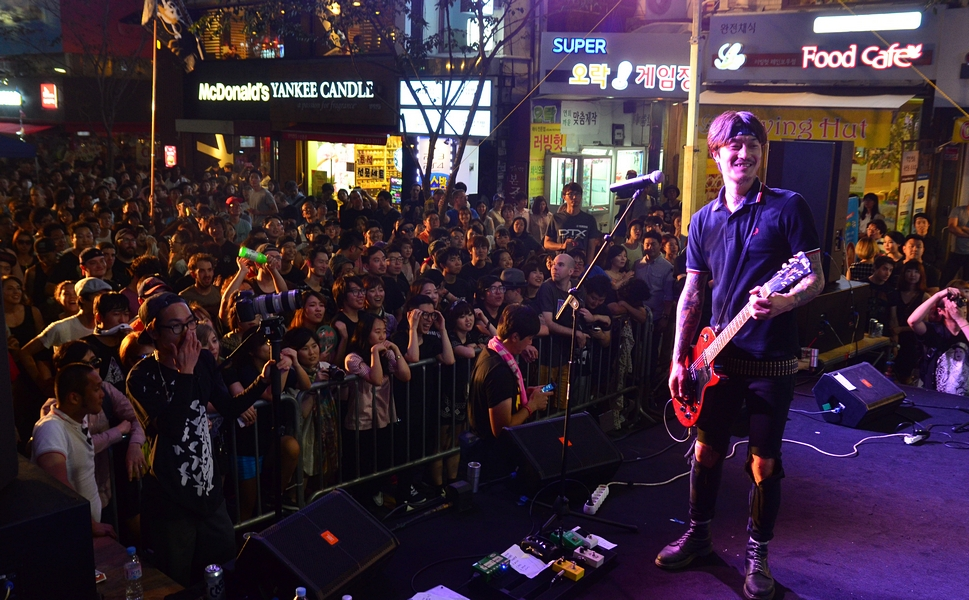
- Skasucks were the penultimate act of the New Generation of Ska Festival, held in Culture Street of Sinchon on 30 August 2014.

Background information
- Origin: Seoul, South Korea
- Genres: Ska punk
- Years active: 2006–present
- Labels: Rock Whale Company; Dope Entertainment; I Wanna Riot
- Members: Ryu Jinsuk, Lee Donghyuk, Jang Booil, Kim Goyang, MH Ryu

Skasucks is a ska punk band based in Seoul, South Korea. They are heavily influenced by ska-punk as well as 2 tone. Formed in 2006, they opened for The Slackers in 2007 and the Chris Murray Combo in 2008. They are known for their lively stage presence. Their lead vocalist Ryu, who also works as a tattoo artist, has become a prominent organiser of the Korean punk music scene. After the lead singers of Rux and Suck Stuff stepped down, Ryu took over Korean operations for the annual Korea/Japan Punk Festival. Ryu also runs the live music venue Club SHARP and tattoo parlour SHARP INK in the same building.

In 2009 two of their songs were nominated for Asia Voice Independent Music Awards, "The Ship is Going Down" for Best Instrumental and "Skaholic" for Genre Bending – Mindboggling – Out of This World Track!

The band name is said to be an absurdity with no literal meaning disparaging ska music.

== New Generation of Ska ==
When Skasucks began, Ryu promoted ska and ska-punk concerts under the name New Generation of Ska. In 2013, after his ninth New Generation of Ska show, he decided to upgrade next year's installment into a festival. The first New Generation of Ska Festival was held on August 30, 2014, as a free outdoor concert in the car-free street of Sinchon leading between Sinchon Station and Yonsei University. The show was free, paid for through 15 million KRW in crowdfunding on the website Tumblbug.

The show included nine Korean ska and punk bands, two Japanese ska bands, and one American band. The Korean bands included Skasucks, Rudy Guns, Ska Wakers, Burning Hepburn, Pegurians, No.1 Korean, Lazybone, Reska, and Beach Valley. The two Japanese ska bands were The Autocratics and The Rollings. The American band was the Bruce Lee Band, led by Korean-American musician Mike Park. The festival was selected by the Jamaican music site Reggae Steady Ska as the 9th best ska festival of 2014.

In 2015, the festival was moved to Multipurpose Art Hall EMU in downtown Seoul. The headlining act is The Toasters, a New York ska band fronted by Robert "Bucket" Hingley. Rather than bring the entire band to Korea, the Japanese ska band Beat Bahnhof will accompany Hingley as backing band, as well as playing their own music. Hingley had the idea to tour Korea through his friend Mike Park.

The festival moved to the small Club SHARP, owned by Skasucks singer Ryu Jinsuk, in Mangwon in 2016, headlined by the Japanese Oi-Skall Mates. In 2017, the festival moves back to the outdoor Sinchon shopping street and admission will again be free. Headliners will be the Suicide Machines from the US, and the Japanese bands Rollings and Coquettish.

== Members ==
- Ryu Jinsuk - vocals, saxophone
- Lee Donghyuk - bass
- Jang Booil - guitar
- MH Ryu - drums
- Kim Goyang - keyboard

=== Former Members ===
- Hong Seongmin - guitar
- Choi Hyein - bass
- Choi Museong - bass
- Hwang Jaeyeon - guitar
- Kim Hoyoung - drums
- Kim Youngmin - drums
- Hong Kiseon - guitar
- Wolly - guitar
- Jude Nah - keyboard
- Gu Jagyeong - drums
- Hong Seungwoo - guitar

== Discography ==
=== Full-Length ===
- SKASUCKS (self-titled) (2010)
- Out of Control (2014)

=== EP ===
- SKASUCKS (2006)
- New Generation of Ska (2009)

=== Compilations ===
- Ska Punk Sound Track (2009)
- Ska Punk Sound Track Vol.2 (2010)
- 'THEM AND US' Korea's punks at Club SPOT (2011)
