= Skankin' Pickle Fever =

Studio album by Skankin' Pickle
- Released: 1992; May 6, 1997 (re-issue)
- Genre: Third wave ska, ska punk, punk rock
- Length: 47:19
- Label: Dill Records
- Producer: Skankin' Pickle, Robert Berry, Mike Mattingly, Pete Roberts,

Skankin' Pickle chronology
Skafunkrastapunk (1991)	Skankin' Pickle Fever (1992)	Sing Along With Skankin' Pickle (1994)

Alternate album covers
- Re-issue artwork

Professional ratings
Review scores
Source	Rating
Allmusic	3/5 stars

Skankin' Pickle Fever is the second studio album by American ska punk band Skankin' Pickle, released in 1992 on the band's own label, Dill Records.

According to Allmusic, Skankin' Pickle Fever was recorded over the course of three days on a budget of $2,000.

Saxophonist Roland Alphonso of The Skatalites makes a guest appearance on the dub song "Roland Alphonso's Dub".

== CD track listing ==
1. "The Hussein Skank" – 3:22
2. "Pseudo Punk" – 2:26
3. "Silly Willy" – 2:32
4. "Ice Cube, Korea Wants A Word With You" – 1:30
5. "Toothless And Grey" – 3:17
6. "Pass You By" – 1:59
7. "The Dub" – 4:16
8. "Song #3" – 0:52
9. "Whatever Happened" – 3:22
10. "Anxiety Attack" – 2:51
11. "Skinless Friend" – 2:20
12. "Larry Smith" – 2:56
13. "I Missed The Bus" – 3:16
14. "Roland Alphonso's Dub" – 5:11
15. "Hand Twister" – 2:35
16. "David Duke Is Running For President" – 1:22
17. "Hit My Brain" – 3:21

== Personnel ==
- Lynette Knackstedt - guitar, vocals, lead vocals on tracks 5 and 15
- Gerry Lundquist - slide trombone, vocals
- Mike "Mr. Clean" Mattingly - bass guitar, vocals, lead vocals on tracks 2, 3, 6, 9, 11 and 17
- Lars Nylander - valve trombone, vocals
- Mike "Bruce Lee" Park - saxophone, vocals, lead vocals on tracks 1, 4, 8, 10, 12, 13 and 16
- Chuck Phelps - drums

=== Additional musicians ===
- Roland Alphonso - tenor saxophone on track 14
- Robert Berry - Hammond organ
