= A Go Go (Potshot album) =

Studio album by Potshot
- Released: February 19, 2002
- Genres: Ska-punk; Third Wave Ska
- Label: Asian Man Records

Potshot chronology
Til I Die (2000)	A Go Go (2002)	Dance to the Potshot Record (2004)

Professional ratings
Review scores
Source	Rating
Allmusic	link

A Go Go is the fourth album of J-ska band Potshot. The album was released in the United States by Asian Man Records in 2002.

== Tracks ==
1. Potshot Go 2:23
2. Not Alone 2:35
3. Right and Chance 2:41
4. She Is Cute 1:44
5. MU330 1:57
6. Good Times and Bad Times [Single Version] 2:55
7. No Fear 2:37
8. End of the Long Summer [Analog Version] :50
9. Hard to Remain 2:23
10. Smile 2:24
11. Make a Change 2:17
12. Go Forward 1:40
13. For You 3:17
14. New Tomorrow 2:58
15. To That Light 2:33
16. No Action 2:32
17. Bonus Track 1:31
