= Smile (Mike Park album) =

Studio album by Mike Park
- Released: August 9, 2011
- Genres: Acoustic, children's music, indie rock
- Length: 22:35
- Label: Asian Man Records
- Producer: Mike Park

Mike Park chronology
Beans & Toast (2008)	Smile (2011)

Smile is the fourth solo album by Mike Park of the ska band The Chinkees. The album is filled with children's songs that he performed for his son and daughter who, according to the Asian Man Records website, "have given their seal of approval."

== Track listing ==
1. "Wiggly Wiggly Worm" - 1:31
2. "Apples Are My Favorite" - 1:27
3. "Little Green Frog" - 2:22
4. "Everybody Loves to Jump" - 2:39
5. "I Can See the Ocean" - 2:50
6. "1..2..3..4..5..6..7..8..Drums" - 1:23
7. "When the Light Turns Red You Stop" - 1:44
8. "Paint with Me" - 3:10
9. "Turn off the Lights" - 1:32
10. "Bus Driver Gus" - 1:16
11. "I Love To Play My Saxophone" - 1:31
12. "We All Live at Animal Park" - 1:10
