= Soft ball =

Soft ball or softball can refer to:

Sport

- Softball, a team sport similar to baseball, and the ball used in the sport
- Nankyu baseball, Japanese "soft-ball baseball"
- Softball squash, the international form of squash, as distinguished from hardball squash, the North American form
- A type of Gaelic handball
- Softball cricket, a form of cricket using an alternative cricket ball

Other

- Soft-ball stage, a stage in candy-making corresponding to 85% sugar
- Softball (band), a Japanese all-girl punk band
- "Softball", episode of the Netflix series Wet Hot American Summer: Ten Years Later

== See also ==
- Hardball (disambiguation)
