= Irish drinking song =

Irish drinking song may refer to:

- "Irish Drinking Song", a song by the ska band Buck-O-Nine from the album Songs in the Key of Bree.
  - Note that this song is commonly misattributed to Flogging Molly, Dropkick Murphys, or The Bouncing Souls, and may additionally be mistitled as "Drink and Fight".
- "The Irish Drinking Song", a song by Australian band Man Bites God.
- "The Irish Drinking Song", a song by American comedian Kyle Gordon.
- "Another Irish Drinking Song", a humorous song by a cappella group Da Vinci's Notebook.
- Irish drinking songs, a game structure used in improvisational comedy where lyrics are improvised upon traditional Irish chords.
- Irish drinking songs, a genre of traditional Irish songs (for example, Seven Drunken Nights).
