= Dance to the Potshot Record =

Studio album by Potshot
- Released: June 22, 2004
- Recorded: 2001
- Genre: Ska-punk
- Label: Asian Man Records

Potshot chronology
| A Go Go (2002) | Dance to the Potshot Record (2004) | Potshot Beat Goes On (2005) |

Professional ratings
Review scores
| Source | Rating |
|---|---|
| AllMusic | 3.5/5 stars |

Dance to the Potshot Record is the fifth album of J-ska band Potshot. The album was released in the United States by Asian Man Records in 2004. This was the last album to come out in the USA. The album was released by Vivid Sound in Japan in 2002.

== Track listing ==
All tracks by Ryoji & Yoko except where noted.

1. "To Hell With Potshot" (Ryoji) – 1:11
2. "Seasons End" – 3:15
3. "In Time Now" – 3:04
4. "Going On" – 2:33
5. "Party" – 2:34
6. "Victory or Lost" – 2:37
7. "Don't Fail to Ride" – 2:33
8. "Silent Time" (Ryoji) – 0:20
9. "About You and Me" – 2:49
10. "Reply" – 2:31
11. "Other Side" – 3:05
12. "Of the Future" – 1:52
13. "In My Heart" – 3:28
14. "Curtain Call" (Ryoji) – 2:51
15. "Spit It Out" – 2:31
16. "Hurt Me More" – 2:25

== Personnel ==
- Chucky – trombone
- Katsuya – bass
- Shigeo Kikuchi – photography
- Mitchy – trumpet
- Ryoji – vocals
- Satoshi – guitar
