= Skafunkrastapunk =

Studio album by Skankin' Pickle
- Released: 1991
- Recorded: 1991 at Soundtek at Campbell, California
- Genre: Ska punk, punk rock, third wave ska
- Length: 47:41
- Label: Dill Records
- Producer: Skankin' Pickle, Eric Parslow, Pete Roberts

Skankin' Pickle chronology
Skafunkrastapunk (1991)	Skankin' Pickle Fever (1992)

Professional ratings
Review scores
Source	Rating
Allmusic	3/5 stars

Skafunkrastapunk is the debut album by American ska punk band Skankin' Pickle, released in 1991 on Dill Records and subsequently re-issued in 1995.

== Track listing ==
All songs written by Skankin' Pickle except where otherwise noted.

1. "Road Zombie" - 2:07
2. "It's Not Too Late" (live) - 3:02
3. "Doin Something Naughty" - 4:00
4. "Hulk Hogan" (live) - 2:03
5. "Racist World" - 5:08
6. "Burnt Head" (live) - 1:47
7. "Asian Man" - 3:29
8. "Ska" (live) - 2:53
9. "Fights" - 4:04
10. "How Funk!" (live) - 7:50
11. "Fakin Jamaican" (Steve Devlin) - 2:26
12. "24 Second Song" (live) - 0:43
13. "You Shouldn't Judge a Man by the Hair on his Butt!!" - 5:51
14. "Peter Piper & Mary" (live) - 2:24

== Personnel ==
=== Skankin' Pickle ===
- Lynette Knackstedt - guitar, vocals, lead vocals on track 5
- Chuck "Mod" Phelps - drums
- Mike "Mr. Clean" Mattingly - bass guitar, vocals, lead vocals on track 3, 6, 10, 13 and 14
- Lars "Slim" Nylander - trombone, vocals
- Gerry Lundquist - trombone, vocals, lead vocals on track 4
- Mike "Bruce Lee" Park - saxophone, vocals, lead vocals on track 2, 7, 9, 11 and 12

=== Additional musicians ===
- Roland Alphonso - tenor saxophone on "Racist World"
- Robert Barry - Hammond organ
