= Santoki =

Song in Korea

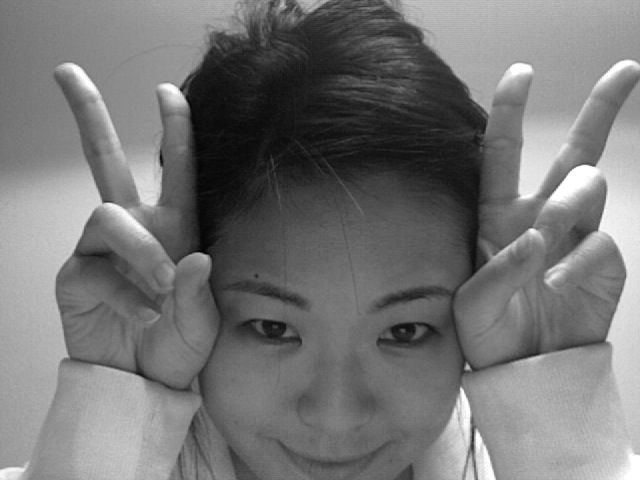
A woman doing santoki.

A woman doing santoki.

"Santoki" is one of the most famous children's songs in Korea. The word "santoki" literally translates as "mountain bunny" or "mountain rabbit" but corresponds to the English "hare."

== English Lyrics ==
First Verse:
Mountain bunny, bunny
Where are you going?
Bouncing, bouncing as you're running.
Where are you going?
Second Verse:
Over the mountain peaks, peaks
I will climb them on my own
Plump, plump chestnuts
I will find and bring

== Korean Lyrics ==
First Verse:
산토끼 토끼야
어디를 가느냐
깡충깡충 뛰면서
어디를 가느냐
Second Verse:
산고개 고개를
나혼자 넘어서
토실토실 알밤을
주워서 올테야

== In popular culture ==
The song was popularized in the United States by the Ska Punk band The Chinkees, who performs the song on their 1999 recording Peace Through Music. Elizabeth Mitchell (musician) also has a version of the song on her 2012 children's folk album "Blue Clouds". Elena Moon Park (musician) also released a version of the song on her 2012 album of East Asian children's and folk songs Rabbit Days and Dumplings.

The song was also sung in the K-drama, Young Lady and Gentleman. The female lead character, Park Dan Dan, asks the male lead character, Lee Young Guk, to sing her a song. He sings Mountain Bunny. He ends up making her contact in his phone, Mountain Bunny.
