= Til I Die (album) =

Studio album by Potshot
- Released: October 3, 2000
- Genre: Ska-punk; Third Wave Ska
- Label: Asian Man Records

Potshot chronology
Rock 'n' Roll (1999)	Til I Die (2000)	A Go Go (2002)

Professional ratings
Review scores
Source	Rating
Allmusic	3/5 stars

’Til I Die is the third album of J-ska band Potshot. The album was released in the United States by Asian Man Records in 2000.

== Tracks ==
1. Potshot Is Coming 1:42
2. Be Alive 2:11
3. My Way 1:57
4. Are You Satisfied? 2:03
5. Every Rain Lets Up 2:55
6. Prize of Game 2:11
7. Do You Laugh at Me? 1:43
8. Tell Me Why 3:04
9. More in Life 2:26
10. #3 :41
11. It's Real 2:10
12. Hitotsu 1:53
13. Nothing in Hand 3:03
14. As You Are 2:21
15. Every Dawn 2:19
16. Mexico 13:15
