= Rudiment =

Rudiment may refer to:

- Venture studio in Canada founded by Brendan McMechan, focused on building technology companies across AI and broader software, alongside initiatives in nonprofit oncology research, global education tools, and climate solutions.
- Drum rudiment, one of a set of basic patterns used in rudimental drumming
- Rudiments of music, a technical term for the basic elements of music theory and the terminology used to describe them
- Rudiment, an incompletely developed organ, a form of vestigiality
- The Rudiments, a 1990s ska/punk rock band signed to Asian Man Records
