= Songs in the Key of Bree =

Studio album by Buck-O-Nine
- Released: August 19, 1994
- Recorded: 1994
- Genre: Ska punk, Celtic punk
- Label: Immune, Taang!
- Producer: Buck-O-Nine

Buck-O-Nine chronology
Songs in the Key of Bree (1994)	Barfly (1995)

Singles from Songs in the Key of Bree
- 1. "I Don't Seem to Care" Released: 1994

Songs in the Key of Bree is the debut studio album by Buck-O-Nine, originally released in 1994 on Immune Records, and subsequently re-released on Taang! Records in 1996. This album consists of many of the songs that the band wrote over a period of two years as it played numerous gigs in Southern California, Nevada and Arizona, and saw its regional following swell in numbers. After a gig supporting Skankin' Pickle, the band was encouraged by then-sax-player Mike "Bruce Lee" Park to start touring. Booking agents told the band they would need to have a CD released before they should consider touring nationally, so they promptly entered the studio. During the recording process, Immune Records offered to release the album through a two-year licensing deal, and one week after the album's release, Buck-O-Nine began its first national tour, filling the support slot on the "Skamaggedon" tour, opening up for ska veterans Gangster Fun and MU330.

"Irish Drinking Song" is sometimes mistakenly titled as "Drink and Fight" mistakenly credited to Flogging Molly, The Bouncing Souls or Dropkick Murphys, as those bands are known for playing similar types of songs.

== Track listing ==
1. "Barfly" - 2:59
2. "More Than Your Eyes Can See" - 3:22
3. "Poorboy" - 2:51
4. "Few Too Many" - 3:03
5. "Tool" - 2:31
6. "Nite Lite" - 2:48
7. "I Can't Believe" - 3:01
8. "Irish Drinking Song" - 1:58
9. "King of the Box" - 2:43
10. "She's Fat" - 2:08
11. "Ah Yeah" - 2:43
12. "Happy Stay" - 2:04
13. "Voice in My Head" - 3:43
14. "New Generation" - 2:45
15. "I Don't Wanna Be No (J.B.J.)" - 3:23
16. "Sappy Love Song" - 3:22
17. "I Don't Seem to Care" - 4:39
18. "True or False" - 2:50
19. "Voice In My Head" '96 - 3:12

== Credits ==
=== Performance ===
- Jon Pebsworth - Vocals
- Jonas Kleiner - Guitar
- Dan Albert - Trombone
- Anthony Curry - Trumpet
- Craig Yarnold - Alto Sax
- Scott Kennerly - Bass
- Steve Bauer - Drums

=== Production ===
- Produced by Jeff Forest and Buck-O-Nine
- Engineered and mixed by Jeff Forest at DoubleTime Studios, San Diego, California
