= Covered (Macy Gray album) =

Studio album by Macy Gray
- Released: March 26, 2012
- Recorded: 2011
- Genre: R&B; soul; rock
- Length: 44:29; 52:58 (iTunes Deluxe Edition)
- Label: 429
- Producer: Macy Gray, Zoux

Macy Gray chronology
The Sellout (2010)	Covered (2012)	Talking Book (2012)

Covered is the sixth studio album by American recording artist Macy Gray, released on March 26, 2012, by 429 Records. As the title suggests, the album features covers of previously released tracks by well known rock, pop, rap, and indie artists. Because of the profanities in some covers, such as "Creep", "Teenagers" and the skit "Really", this is Gray's first album to officially bear a Parental Advisory warning, though a clean version was also issued. Gray appeared on Conan to promote the album.

== Critical reception ==
Professional ratings
Aggregate scores
Source	Rating
AnyDecentMusic?	6.1/10
Metacritic	68/100
Review scores
Source	Rating
AllMusic	3.5/5 stars
Metro	2/5 stars
MusicOMH	3/5 stars
PopMatters	7/10
Robert Christgau	B+

Covered received generally positive reviews from music critics. At Metacritic, which assigns a normalized rating out of 100 to reviews from mainstream critics, the album received an average score of 68, based on 5 reviews, which indicates "generally favorable reviews". At AnyDecentMusic?, that collates critical reviews from more than 50 media sources, the album scored 6.1 points out of 10.

== Track listing ==
1. "Here Comes the Rain Again" - 3:44 (Eurythmics song)
2. "Creep" - 4:18 (Radiohead song)
3. "You Want Them Nervous (Skit)" [feat. J.B. Smoove] - 1:12
4. "Smoke 2 Joints" - 2:48 (The Toyes/Sublime song)
5. "La La La (Teaching the Kids)" [feat. Layann Al Saud, Avery Albert, Happy Hinds, & Sienna Steiber] - 0:25
6. "Teenagers" - 2:56 (My Chemical Romance song)
7. "The Power of Love" [feat. Hugh Salk] - 0:41
8. "Nothing Else Matters" (Metallica song) -5:42
9. "Sail" - 4:27 (Awolnation song)
10. "I Try Is Cool and All, But (Skit)" [feat. Nicole Scherzinger] - 1:29
11. "Maps" - 2:51 (Yeah Yeah Yeahs song)
12. "Love Lockdown/Buck" - 3:59 (Kanye West/Nina Simone song)
13. "Mel Rap [feat. Mel Hinds]" - 0:33
14. "Bubbly" [feat. Idris Elba] - 3:11 (Colbie Caillat song)
15. "Wake Up" (Arcade Fire song) - 3:52
16. "Really (Skit)" [feat. MC Lyte] - 2:21
17. "Here Comes The Rain Again (Dirty Plastic Hits Remix)" (iTunes Bonus Track)- 3:44
18. "Sail (Dirty Plastic Hits Remix)" (iTunes Bonus Track) - 4:46

== Charts ==
Chart (2012)	Peak position
Croatian Albums Charts	29
Finnish Albums (Suomen virallinen lista)	44
Italian Albums (FIMI)	92
UK R&B Albums (OCC)	26
US Top R&B/Hip-Hop Albums (Billboard)	35
