= Colossal (band) =

American indie rock band

- Origin: Chicago, Illinois, United States
- Genres: Indie rock, punk rock, math rock, emo
- Years active: 2001-2007, 2016
- Labels: Asian Man Records, Grey Flight Records, Count Your Lucky Stars Records, Topshelf Records
- Members: Pat Ford; Rob Kellenberger; Jason Flaks; Neil Hennessy
- Past members: Chris Perrin; Eli Caterer; Jeff Feucht

Colossal was an American indie rock band from Elgin, Illinois, United States, formed in 2001. They have one EP and one full-length, and have appeared on multiple compilations. Their lyrics and musicianship display a depth much like that found in math rock.

== Band history ==
Colossal was formed in Elgin, Illinois, in late 2001 by friends Jeff Feucht (bass), Jason Flaks (trumpet, guitar, vocals), Rob Kellenberger (drums, backup vocals), and Pat Ford (vocals, guitar). They began playing shows in spring of 2002 in and around Chicago, Illinois. Asian Man Records released their debut, a self-titled, six-song EP (also known as "Brave the Elements"), in January 2003. The band’s genre-crossing ways were already evident on the EP, as the songs fuse elements of punk, jazz, and jangly pop with a focused singularity. The sound is intricate and dense but still accessible and unified. The EP received universal critical acclaim and attendance at shows steadily increased. The band's first tour, of eastern Canada and the East Coast, was that summer.

The following months were spent writing what would become their first full-length. In early 2004, Feucht left the band to dedicate more time to his teaching career. He was replaced by Eli Caterer (of Smoking Popes), who finished writing and recording the new album. Welcome the Problems, the debut full-length, was released on Asian Man in September 2004 on the heels of a western U.S. tour. Musically, the full-length is the logical next step from the EP; the songs are more concise in their arrangements and the sounds are more developed and cohesive. Critical reaction to the album was overwhelmingly complimentary, and the band’s following continued to expand at a rapid pace. After the album’s release, Neil Hennessy (of The Lawrence Arms), who’d been sitting in as a second drummer since the first Colossal tour, joined the band, as did Chris Perrin, who replaced Caterer on bass. A brief east coast tour with the new lineup followed the release of Problems. The vinyl version of the album was released by Grey Flight Records in January 2005. Also in January, Jason, Pat, and Rob assisted Asian Man Records/Plea for Peace Foundation founder Mike Park in the writing and recording of his second album, North Hangook Falling, which was co-released by Sub City Records & Asian Man Records in July 2005. In 2005, the band did a western and Midwestern tour with Mike Park, an eastern jaunt with Alkaline Trio, and a small tours of the Midwest and eastern Canada.

Flaks left the band in fall 2005 and was replaced on guitar by the returning Eli Caterer. In December 2006, Caterer's band, Smoking Popes, announced their reunion, with Colossal drummer Kellenberger taking over on drums. Kellenberger left the Popes, and Caterer again left Colossal, this time to concentrate on the Popes. The band went on hiatus in 2007.

Flaks, Ford, Hennessy, and Kellenberger reunited to play a single show for Asian Man Records' 20th Anniversary in San Francisco in July 2016. A split 7-inch with Owen was released by Asian Man in September 2016 featuring the first new Colossal material in 11 years.

A remastered Colossal EP was issued on vinyl by Count Your Lucky Stars Records and Topshelf Records in 2017. Welcome the Problems was remastered and reissued on vinyl by Asian Man in 2018.

== Discography ==
- Colossal EP (2003)
- Welcome the Problems LP (2004)
- Colossal / Owen split 7-inch (2016)
