= Teens in Trouble =

- Origin: Raleigh, North Carolina
- Genres: Indie rock, punk rock
- Years active: 2015–present
- Label: Asian Man Records
- Website: www.teensintrouble.net

Teens in Trouble is an American indie rock band based in Raleigh, North Carolina. The group is led by singer Lizzie Killian. The group is currently signed to Asian Man Records.

== Career ==
Lizzie Killian grew up in San Francisco in a Filipino household. The group began in 2015, when Killian released a song titled "Santa Monica". The band released their first self-titled EP in 2022. In late 2023, the band announced plans to release their first full-length album the following year, and released a single titled "You Don't Want To Mess With Me" featuring Stefan Babcock of the band PUP. In 2024, the group released their debut full-length album titled What's Mine. In 2025, the band released a split with the band Bat Boy.

== Discography ==
Studio albums

- What's Mine (2024, Asian Man Records)

EPs

- Teens In Trouble (2022, Asian Man Records)

Splits

- Teens In Trouble/Bat Boy (2025, Asian Man Records)
