= Sustain (album) =

Studio album by Buck-O-Nine
- Released: August 7, 2007
- Recorded: February – March 2007
- Genre: Ska punk
- Label: Asian Man, Stomp, Dude
- Producer: Buck-O-Nine

Buck-O-Nine chronology
On a Mission (2001)	Sustain (2007)	Fun Day Mental (2019)

Sustain is the fifth studio album from Buck-O-Nine and was released in the United States on August 7, 2007 on Asian Man Records and in Canada on September 6, 2007 by Stomp Records.

== Track listing ==
1. I'm Not Dead
2. Cook Me Into The Bowl
3. Screamin' From the Suburbs
4. Less Than Comfortable
5. Knocking Down the Door
6. I Am One
7. Slow me Down
8. Lie to Me
9. Nothing Left to Lose
10. Sailing Away
11. Silence
12. Let's Drink

== Credits ==
=== Performance ===
- Jon Pebsworth - vocals
- Jonas Kleiner - guitar
- Dan Albert - trombone
- Anthony Curry - trumpet
- Craig Yarnold - tenor saxophone
- Andy Platfoot - bass
- Jeff Hawthorne - drums

=== Production ===
- Produced by Buck-O-Nine
- Recorded and engineered by Jeff Forrest at Doubletime Studios, San Diego, CA
- Mixed and mastered by Jason Livermore at The Blasting Room, Fort Collins, CO
- Artwork and design by Jonas Kleiner, Cover Photo by Andy Platfoot
