= Til I Die (disambiguation) =

"'Til I Die" is a 1971 song by The Beach Boys.

Til I Die or Till I Die may also refer to:

- Til I Die (album), by Potshots, 2000
- "Till I Die" (Chris Brown song), 2012
- "Till I Die" (Machine Gun Kelly song), 2015
- "Till I Die", a 2021 song by Ken Carson from Project X
- "Till I Die", a 2011 song by White Town from Monopole

== See also ==
- "Until I Die", a 2007 song by September
