= Rock 'n' Roll (Potshot album) =

Studio album by Potshot
- Released: March 9, 1999
- Genre: Ska-punk; Third Wave Ska
- Label: Asian Man Records

Potshot chronology
Pots and Shots (1997)	Rock 'n' Roll (1999)	Til I Die (2000)

Professional ratings
Review scores
Source	Rating
Allmusic	3.5/5 stars

Rock 'n' Roll is the second album of the skacore band Potshot. The album was released in the United States by Asian Man Records in 1999.

== Tracks ==
1. Sing Along With Potshot :41
2. Freedom 1:41
3. Feel 2:05
4. Believe Ourselves 2:18
5. Trashy Talk 1:53
6. Go & See My Sweet Pie 2:18
7. I Can 2:19
8. Pure & Tender 1:42
9. Being With Me 1:35
10. Those Days 1:39
11. Beyond the Truth 1:09
12. Kiss the Fact 1:58
13. Bonus Track 1:19
