= 666-Pack =

Studio album by Insanity Alert
- Released: January 25, 2019
- Studios: Nautilus Sounds (Dornbirn, Austria)
- Genres: Thrash metal; crossover thrash
- Length: 32:24
- Label: Season of Mist
- Producer: Toni Loitsch

Insanity Alert chronology
Moshburger (2016)	666-Pack (2019)	Shredator (2020)

Singles from 666-Pack
- 1. "All Mosh / No Brain" Released: November 15, 2018; 2. "Welcome to Hell" Released: December 7, 2018; 3. "The Body of the Christ is the Parasite" Released: January 8, 2019

666-Pack is the third studio album by Austrian thrash metal band Insanity Alert. It was released on January 25, 2019, through Season of Mist and follows their previous record, Moshburger (2016).

The album was recorded at Nautilus Sounds Studios in Dornbirn, Austria, produced by Toni Loitsch, and mastered by Dan Randall.

== Composition ==
Like with previous releases, Insanity Pack "thrash their way through old-school songs" on the album, including a cover version of "Smoke Two Joints" by The Toyes, a disco parody ("Saturday Grind Fever"), and "Mosh Mosh Mosh", a parody of "Boys Boys Boys" by Sabrina Salerno. Most of the 21 songs on the album are less than two minutes long, with the longest being the outro track, "Dark Energon".

== Promotion ==
In an interview with Invisible Oranges published on January 24, vocalist Kevin Stout named the five thrash and crossover albums that most influenced Insanity Alert: Speak English or Die by SOD, The Art of Partying by Municipal Waste, Kill 'Em All by Metallica, Beneath the Remains by Sepultura, and Handle with Care by Nuclear Assault. In another interview with Metal Injection published on March 30, Stout compared 666-Pack to the band's previous releases: "It’s definitively harder and faster. I think we show progression in all areas. The guys have become even better musicians, the production is through the roof and the levels of anger, frustration, party and weirdness have reached new heights."

The album's lead single, "All Mosh / No Brain", was released on November 14, 2018, along with a corresponding music video. A second single titled "Welcome to Hell" was released on December 7. A third single, "The Body of the Christ is the Parasite", was released on January 8, 2019, along with a corresponding lyric video. Following the album release later that month, an animated lyric video was released for the song "Death by Wrecking Ball" on September 27. A live video for "A Skullcrushin’ Good Time", recorded during a performance on the main stage at Hellfest 2019 in France, was released on January 30, 2020. Another live video from their Hellfest 2019 performance was released on May 10, 2021, this time for "All Mosh / No Brain". Insanity Pack also announced a European tour in support of 666-Pack running from March to August 2019, including performances at various metal festivals.

== Critical reception ==
666-Pack
Review scores
Source	Rating
Distorted Sound Mag	7/10
Ghost Cult Mag	7/10
Metal.de	8/10
Metal Injection	8.5/10
Metal Temple	9/10
Ox-Fanzine	3.5/5 stars
PowerMetal.de	9/10

Metal Temple's V. Srikar deemed the album "another near masterpiece" from Insanity Pack while also asserting that it "isn't one for the Metal purists who bitch about how good Metal ended in the 80s." Bjorn Gieseler of Metal.de praised the guitar work in particular, adding that the band "perfectly capture the energy of their live show". A review in Metal Injection referred to the album as "a record that speaks to the enduring fun of thrash metal and one that also shows a clear understanding of the long term potential of the genre," observing artistic growth from the band.

Marcel Rapp, writing for PowerMetal.de, stated that the album has "everything INSANITY ALERT uses: lightning-fast riffing, incredibly iconic artwork, killer choruses, an extremely entertaining pace, and that certain catchiness that makes "666-Pack" so listenable". Referencing the various old-school covers, Guntram Pintgen of Ox-Fanzine opined: "These songs are, of course, utterly unoriginal, but precisely for that reason, they're simply a blast and are sure to liven up any metal party."

In a more lukewarm review, Eddie Simms of Distorted Sound Mag applauded the "fun that emanates" from the album, although he also criticized the vapidity and pointlessness of certain songs, concluding that "there isn’t a lot to take home apart from the overwhelming feeling of wanting to smash back a multi pack of beer and party hard." Steve Tovey of Ghost Cult Mag, who similarly referred to it as a "beer-chugging... album", wrote that "the focus is on the fun elements of Crossover and all the expected tropes are harvested with an infectious energy, and no little quality."

== Track listing ==
666-Pack track listing
No.	Title	Length
1.	"Thirstkiller"	1:13
2.	"The Body of the Christ is the Parasite"	1:43
3.	"All Mosh / No Brain"	1:32
4.	"Cobra Commander"	2:39
5.	"Saturday Grind Fever"	1:00
6.	"Echoes of Death"	2:04
7.	"Windmilli Vanilli"	0:59
8.	"StopSlammertime!"	0:08
9.	"Why so Beerious_"	1:49
10.	"Mosh Mosh Mosh"	0:47
11.	"One-Eye is King (In the Land of the Blind)"	2:36
12.	"Welcome to Hell"	1:47
13.	"Two Joints"	1:13
14.	"Chronic State of Hate"	2:13
15.	"I Come / I Fuck Shit up / I Leave"	1:26
16.	"A Skullcrushin' Good Time"	2:16
17.	"The Ballad of Slayer"	0:05
18.	"Demons Get out!"	2:18
19.	"8 Bit Brutality"	0:07
20.	"Death by Wrecking Ball"	1:11
21.	"Dark Energon"	3:09
Total length:		32:24
