= The Chinkees Are Coming =

Studio album by the Chinkees
- Released: February 24, 1998
- Recorded: Late 1997 – early 1998
- Studios: Soundtek, Campbell, CA
- Genres: Ska punk, ska
- Label: Asian Man
- Producer: Mike Park

The Chinkees chronology
The Chinkees Are Coming (1998)	Peace Through Music (1999)

Professional ratings
Review scores
Source	Rating
AllMusic	3/5 stars

The Chinkees Are Coming (also known as ...Are Coming) is the first studio album by the all-Asian ska punk band the Chinkees. Released in 1998 on Asian Man Records, it was the first of three studio albums by the band. Some of the album's proceeds went to anti-racist organizations.

== Critical reception ==
AllMusic wrote that "the message of harmony makes The Chinkees Are Coming! a pleasing listen for 2-Tone fans who miss ska's more political aspects in the late-'90s third wave revival."

== Track listing ==
All tracks written by Mike Park, except where noted.

No.	Title	Length
1.	"Our Country"	1:37
2.	"You Don't Know" (Casey, Finch, Park)	2:39
3.	"Hana" (Kina, Park)	1:40
4.	"Asian Prodigy"	3:00
5.	"Not Your Pet" (Andriano)	1:20
6.	"Human Race" (Cochrane, Park)	4:00
7.	"They Need Your Help"	0:39
8.	"Norehapshida"	1:53
9.	"She's My Friend"	1:51
10.	"Those Years"	2:02
11.	"Day's 'r' Falling Around"	2:03
12.	"Edumoya"	1:16
13.	"The Chinkees Are Coming"	46:42
