= Buck-O-Nine =

American ska punk band

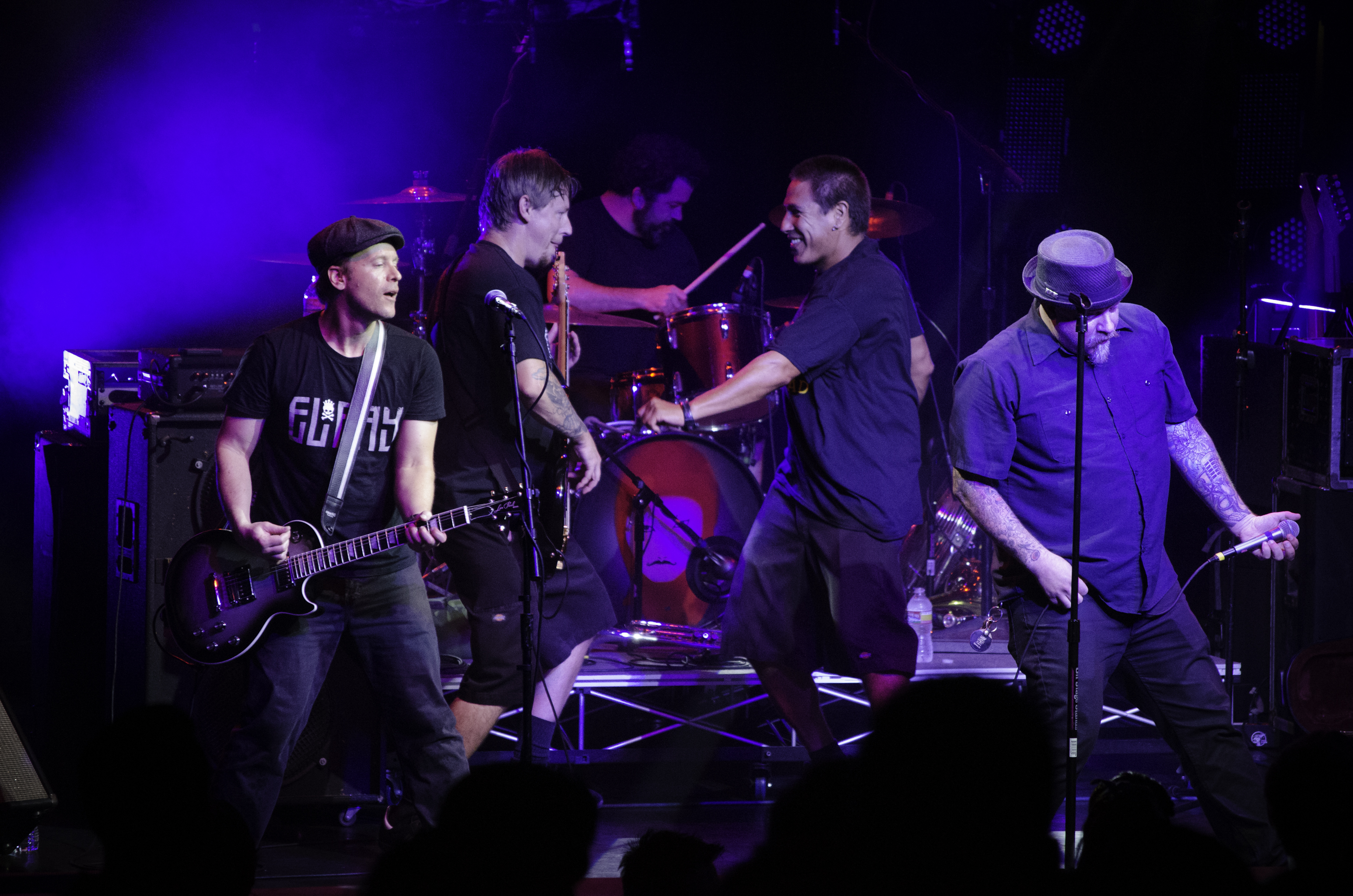
- Performing live in Santa Ana, CA 2012

Background information
- Origin: San Diego, California, United States
- Genres: Ska, ska punk, reggae rock
- Years active: 1991–present
- Labels: Taang!, TVT, Offramp, Moon Ska Europe, Asian Man, Cleopatra
- Members: Dan Albert; Steve Bauer; Jon Pebsworth; Jonas Kleiner; Craig Yarnold; Scott Kennerly
- Past members: Chris Paffendorf; Jeff Hawthorne; John Bell; Anthony Curry; Simon Poulton; Andy Platfoot; John Arquilla
- Website: http://www.buckonine.com/

Buck-O-Nine is an American ska punk band that was formed in San Diego in 1991. The band has toured internationally and released several albums and EPs, as well as appearing on compilations and film soundtracks. During the mid-to-late 1990s, they experienced mainstream success with the release of the album Twenty-Eight Teeth and its most successful single, "My Town". As the popularity of third-wave ska waned, Buck-O-Nine stopped touring full-time in 2000, but continues to perform regularly throughout California and much of the Southwestern United States. Since 2001, the band has also performed in Japan, the UK, Canada, Mexico and Hawaii.

Buck-O-Nine released its sixth studio album, entitled FunDayMental, on April 19, 2019 on Cleopatra Records.

== History ==
=== 1991 to 1993 ===
Buck-O-Nine formed around the end of 1991, when the original member of the band, Scott Kennerly, placed a newspaper ad and Steve Bauer and Craig Yarnold answered and began playing with the earliest incarnation of the band. Previous to Buck-O-Nine, saxophone player, Craig Yarnold was in a Ska band called the Spy Kids, which also included Matt Hensley from the band Flogging Molly on guitar, and Scott Russo from the band Unwritten Law on keyboard. By very early 1992, Buck-O-Nine had played its first live club gig, opening for The Mighty Mighty Bosstones at the Spirit Club (now Brick By Brick) in San Diego, California. After the first few shows, the lead singer was replaced by Jon Pebsworth, and Dan Albert and Tony Curry joined the band to fill out the horn section.

There are several stories about where Buck-O-Nine's name came from. One was that someone used the phrase in the context of a joke they were telling ("yo mamma don't weigh more than a buck-o-nine," or something to that effect). Another version was the band pooled their money for beer and all they had was a dollar and nine cents.

Jon Pebsworth's entry to the band was solidified after the first rehearsal. Previous to Buck-O-Nine, he was in a hardcore punk band called Labeled Victims, which also included Pat Kim, former bass player of the band Unwritten Law. Pebsworth had a binder full of lyrics, many of which were written during his time in Labeled Victims, and as the band went through its material for him, he began flipping through pages and plugging in lyrics for each song, almost as if the lyrics had been written for the music without him ever hearing it. At the band's next rehearsal, Pebsworth showed up with his shoulder in a sling - he had broken it the previous weekend while stage-diving at a local punk show.

Likewise, Dan Albert and Tony Curry had been playing together in reggae bands, including T. Irie Dread, for several years, and had developed a large repertoire of horn lines and riffs that had gone unused, yet somehow fit into many of the songs Buck-O-Nine would write over the next several years. Albert and Curry still occasionally perform with T. Irie Dread in and around San Diego.

By the end of 1992, the band prepared to release a twelve song demo tape entitled Buck Naked, which featured a cartoon drawing by then drummer Steve Bauer, depicting a naked deer sheepishly covering its private parts. Steve was attending art school at the time, and used the album art as one of his class projects.

During the recording process, Jonas Kleiner was recruited to play guitar. Kleiner's first rehearsal with the Buck-O-Nine was remarkable in that the band had spent the entire day auditioning guitar players, and Jonas was the last person scheduled to show up. None of the previous guitarists had come close to being able to play the ska style that the music demanded. When Jonas began jamming, his style fit in with the band immediately. Jonas' previous experience playing in various Arizona punk and ska bands became an asset to Buck-O-Nine, and over the years his guitar work would provide the musical foundation for many songs.

Most of the guitar tracks on the demo were recorded by bass player Scott Kennerly, with Jonas recording guitar tracks on one song. The demo was released on cassette tape on the band's own pseudo record label, Working Class Records. Working Class Records would also be the pseudo home of the band The Mountain Men, which was composed of friends and roommates of some members of Buck-O-Nine.

Shortly after the demo was released, a 7" record, known as the California 7", was released on Silver Girl Records. The front cover of the record sleeve features the license plate from Kennerly's truck, attached to the bumper of an old car at a junk-yard and photographed by Kennerly.

It was during this early period that the band began establishing itself in the San Diego all-ages music scene by playing regularly at the well-known club, SOMA . Originally located in downtown San Diego, SOMA was a unique venue because it had a basement stage area (affectionately known as "The Dungeon") where new bands would perform with hopes of drawing enough fans to be promoted to the main stage located above on the main floor. Buck-O-Nine was able to move from the dungeon to the main stage within a short period of time, and thus began opening up for local favorites such as Sprung Monkey, as well as nationally touring acts like Skankin' Pickle. By the time Buck-O-Nine released its first album in 1994, they were regularly selling out the venue, with an estimated 900 - 1000 fans attending most shows.

=== 1994 to 1996 ===
In 1994, the band released its first full-length album, Songs in the Key of Bree on San Diego label Immune Records. One week after the CD was released, the band embarked on its first US tour, in support of fellow ska bands Gangster Fun, from Detroit, and MU330 from St. Louis. Unfortunately, the tour was never completed due to a series of misfortunes. Buck-O-Nine had been told prior to leaving for the tour that all bands would be sharing one drum kit. Of course, when the band arrived at the first gig in Corona, California, they found that they were the only band without a drum kit. Fortunately, the other bands were gracious enough to share drums.

Shortly after the halfway point, MU330 had to drop off the tour when their drummer fell ill. On the last leg of the tour, which had the remaining bands swinging through the deep south, Gangster Fun's tour bus (actually an old school bus) broke down and forced them to head home. This left Buck-O-Nine stranded in Mississippi (without a drum kit), where they shacked up at Tony's grandmother's house for several days, attempting to piece together the remainder of the tour. Of course, with the headliner and main support acts gone, promoters were unwilling to commit to hosting the remaining shows, so Buck-O-Nine packed up and headed straight home to San Diego.

"Irish Drinking Song" from Songs in the Key of Bree is sometimes mistakenly titled as "Drink and Fight" and mistakenly credited to Flogging Molly, The Bouncing Souls or Dropkick Murphys. Although Flogging Molly and Dropkick Murphys are known for playing similar types of songs, that particular song was written and recorded by Buck-O-Nine.

In 1995, Buck-O-Nine released its second full-length album, entitled Barfly on Taang! Records. The album title was inspired by the movie of the same name, starring Mickey Rourke and Faye Dunaway. The album featured a mixture of originals and cover tunes by bands which had inspired Buck-O-Nine's music since the band's inception. The track "Barfly" actually appears on two Buck-O-Nine albums, Songs in the Key of Bree (1994) and "Barfly" (1995). Songs in the Key of Bree was originally released on Immune Records, a tiny San Diego Label. Curtis Casella, owner of Taang! Records and a Bukowski fan, wanted to release a Buck-O-Nine EP on his label called Barfly that would consist of several cover tunes and the Buck-O-Nine original, Barfly. Taang! eventually re-released Key Of Bree as well. As sales of Barfly started to increase, the band was slapped with a cease and desist notice. The original cover of the album used images of both Mickey Rourke and Faye Dunaway. The actors' legal representation were less than thrilled with this. In 1996, drummer Steve Bauer created an alternate album cover for Barfly, which is the current album cover.

During this time, the band also released a video, entitled "Raw Crap" which was composed of tour footage shot by the band as well as the videos for the songs "On A Mission" and "Water In My Head". The "On A Mission" video was shot in Boston by a friend of Curtis Casella. The "Water In My Head" video was shot in San Diego by Mark Mannschreck, a friend of Jonas'.

Other notable events during this period include:

- The band's first trip to Japan, playing two shows in Tokyo in support of Voodoo Glow Skulls.
- A US tour with The Suicide Machines. This tour marked the beginning of a friendship between the two bands, who would continue to perform together over the next several years.
- Touring much of the US in support of The Specials. This tour greatly increased the band's visibility in the national ska music scene. During the tour, Specials guitar player Roddy Radiation commented that bands like Buck-O-Nine had helped spark a resurgence of interest in ska music in America, which enabled The Specials to return to the US and play to larger audiences in larger venues than they had just a couple of years previously.

In 1996, after two years of constant touring, Buck-O-Nine saw the sales of their Taang! releases, Songs In The Key of Bree and Barfly, increase substantially to well over 60,000 copies sold.

=== 1997 to 1999 ===
Buck-O-Nine's next full-length release was the 1997 album Twenty-Eight Teeth on TVT Records. The album was released April 15, 1997, while the band was touring the U.S. with Face To Face.

With the release of this third album, and several years of touring under their belts, Buck-O-Nine began to see increased national radio airplay with the release of the single "My Town". A video was shot and received limited airplay on MTV. Twenty-Eight Teeth sold over 200,000 copies, appearing in a top spot on the Billboard HeatSeekers chart at one point, and appearing in the Billboard Top 200 for one week, peaking at No. 190. In addition, "My Town" was featured in season 8 of Beverly Hills, 90210 in the episode, "Toil And Trouble," which aired October 29, 1997. The band toured constantly to promote Twenty-Eight Teeth, sharing the stage with a wide variety of bands, both in and outside their genre. Notable appearances included the 1997 Warped Tour, and being picked by Primus as the support act on their tour for The Brown Album.

On top of extensive national touring, Buck-O-Nine co-headlined a nationwide tour of Canada along with the Suicide Machines. The tour saw both bands enjoy increased popularity north of the border, and culminated with a show at Toronto's famed El Mocambo club. The band also traveled to Australia twice, playing shows up and down the east coast and connecting with Australia's most famous ska band, The Porkers.

The band's fourth album Libido was released on TVT Records in 1999. Buy this time, drummer Steve Bauer had left the band, and studio drummer Chuck Treece was hired to record the drum tracks. Libido represents an evolution in the sound the band had developed, steering somewhat away from the ska and punk sound that defined Buck-O-Nine in the earlier years. One of the stand-out tracks, "Who Are They?," was featured on an episode of Six Feet Under. By the time Libido was released, the popularity of third wave ska in the US had crested and was beginning to recede. During this period, original bass player Scott Kennerly left the band and was replaced by original Unwritten Law bassist, John Bell. The band continued to tour throughout 1999, but stopped working full-time after this.

Unfortunately, Buck-O-Nine's last national tour almost ended in tragedy when Bell fell ill with severe stomach pain. After soundchecking for a gig in Pittsburgh, PA Bell collapsed back-stage and had to be rushed to the hospital, where doctors discovered he was suffering from Meckel's Diverticulum. Surgery followed, and eventually, the band headed straight home for San Diego, while Bell recovered with his parents by his side. Longtime associated Andy Platfoot filled in on bass for the ailing Bell before becoming a full-time member of the band.

Buck-O-Nine won eight San Diego Music Awards between 1995 - 2000.

=== 2000 to present ===
In 2000, Buck-O-Nine released Hellos and Goodbyes, a live album which also included new unreleased tracks that were demos of songs intended for a 5th full-length studio CD release. Buck-O-Nine eventually decided to not pursue the recording of this album.

Between the latter part of 2000 and well into 2001, things quieted down for the band, and they considered calling it quits altogether. During this period, John Bell left the band as he pursued college and a career in engineering full-time. An offer to tour the UK saw the band regroup near the end of 2001 and release a UK only album composed of tracks from the band's first two albums and e.p. A successful tour of much of the UK ensued, and in the aftermath, Buck-O-Nine found itself re-energized and continued to play regional shows and write new material.

Between 2002 and 2004, the band wrote close to 20 new songs, but most of them fell by the wayside until 2006 when they got serious about putting together a new album. Only three songs that had previously been written survived the cut, and the band relentlessly pumped out another nine original songs throughout the end of 2006. The philosophy was simple – to stick to what the band does best, which is to write and perform high-energy ska-influenced music that combines elements of reggae, punk and rock & roll.

Before entering a professional recording studio, the band recorded the entire album using its own recording equipment and rehearsal studio so that they could get a better feel for what the finished product might sound like, and iron out any underlying issues with arrangement, tuning and tempos. The band decided to return to Doubletime Studios in El Cajon, California, where the first two studio albums were recorded. In early 2007 they began recording tracks during several weekend and evening sessions. At the end of recording and during some preliminary mixing sessions, they decided to have the entire album shipped to The Blasting Room in Fort Collins, Colorado for final mixing and mastering.

In 2007, Buck-O-Nine released its fifth studio album, entitled Sustain, and performed on all California dates of the Vans Warped Tour.

In December 2007, the band filmed a video for the song I'm not Dead. The video was filmed and edited by bass player Andy Platfoot. He has also directed and edited music videos for a number of bands, including Flogging Molly.

Guitarist Jonas Kleiner is also the guitarist and singer of the San Diego band, Destrung.

In 2012, Jeff Hawthorne left the band and was replaced by original drummer Steve Bauer.

In 2018, the band recorded its sixth studio album, FunDayMental, which was released by Cleopatra Records on CD and vinyl on April 19, 2019.

In December 2021, Pebsworth suffered a cardiac arrest and was hospitalized for surgery. The band started a GoFundMe campaign to pay his medical costs. The band's scheduled tour with Mustard Plug was postponed.

In June 2022, the band released the album 572 Days Later on Cleopatra Records. The album was recorded live in the studio, with some overdubs added in post-production.

In December 2024, the band finished recording its seventh studio album, which is scheduled for release by Cleopatra Records in 2025.

== Members ==
=== Current ===
- Jon Pebsworth - vocals (1991–present)
- Dan Albert - trombone (1991–present)
- Steve Bauer - drums (1991-1999, 2012–present)
- Jonas Kleiner - guitar (1992–present)
- Craig Yarnold - alto/tenor saxophone (1991–present)
- Scott Kennerly - bass guitar (1991–1999, 2024–present)

=== Former ===
- Anthony Curry - trumpet (1991-2024)
- Andy Platfoot - bass (2001-2024)
- Jeff Hawthorne - drums (1999-2012)
- John Bell - bass guitar (1999–2001)
- John Arquilla - vocals (1991-1992)
- Chris Paffendorf - guitar (1991-1992)

== Discography ==
=== Albums ===
Year	Title	Label	Format
1994	Songs in the Key of Bree	Taang! Records	CD, Vinyl (LP), Cassette
1995	Barfly	Taang! Records	CD, Vinyl (LP), Cassette
1996	Water in My Head	Taang! Records	CD, Vinyl (EP)
1997	Twenty-Eight Teeth	TVT Records	CD, Vinyl (LP), Cassette
1998	Pass the Dutchie	TVT Records	CD, Vinyl (EP)
1999	Libido	TVT Records	CD, Vinyl (LP)
2000	Hellos and Goodbyes (Live)	Offramp Records	CD
2001	On a Mission	Moon Ska Europe	CD (compilation)
2007	Sustain	Asian Man Records	CD
2019	FunDayMental	Cleopatra Records	CD, Vinyl (LP)
2022	572 Days Later	Cleopatra Records	CD, Vinyl (LP)
2025	Cut Out the Noise	Cleopatra Records	CD, Vinyl (LP)

=== Compilation appearances ===
Year	Title	Label	Format
1993	Blackpool's Skampilation, Vol. 2	Steady Beat	7"/cassette - Out of print
1996	Spawn of Skarmageddon	Moon Ska Records/Caroline	CD
1996	Joint Ventures in Ska	Red Distribution	CD
1997	Misfits of Ska II	Asian Man Records	CD
1997	The Duran Duran Tribute Album	Umvd Labels	CD
1997	Got TVT?	TVT Records	CD
1997	Move to the Ska Groove	Stubborn Records	CD
1998	SRH Presents: Lose Your Illusion, Vol. 1	Interscope Records	CD
1998	Steady Sounds From the Underground	SideOneDummy Records	CD
Unknown	Digital Snow - A Snowboarder's Soundtrack	Prophecy	CD, DVD
2001	2001 Warped Tour Compilation	SideOneDummy Records	CD
2004	Still Standing: A North American Ska Compilation	Megalith Records	CD
2007	2007 Warped Tour Compilation	SideOneDummy Records	CD
2007	Ska is Dead	Asian Man Records	CD
2017	Punk Rock Halloween - Loud Fast & Scary	Cleopatra Records	CD
2020	Ska Against Racism	Bad Time Records	Digital, Vinyl

=== Singles ===
Song	Year	Label	Other Information
My Town	1997	TVT Records	Peaked at No. 32 on Billboard Modern Rock Tracks chart

== Videography ==
=== Music videos ===
Year	Title	Album
1995	"On a Mission"	Barfly
1996	"Water in my Head"	Water in My Head
1997	"My Town"	Twenty-Eight Teeth
2007	"I'm Not Dead"	Sustain
2017	"Don't Be Afraid"	PUNK ROCK HALLOWEEN – LOUD, FAST & SCARY (CD)
2019	"Top Of The World"	FunDayMental
2019	"In My Room"	FunDayMental
2019	"Tuff Rudeboy"	FunDayMental

=== Soundtracks ===
1998	The Big Hit
1998	Homegrown
2000	Whipped
