= Potshot (band) =

Background information
- Origin: Tokyo, Japan
- Genres: Ska punk, Punk rock
- Years active: 1995–2005, 2015, 2022
- Labels: TV-FREAK Records; Asian Man Records
- Website: www.ukproject.com/potshot

Potshot was a Japanese J-ska music group from Japan. They released their records on their own label, TV Freak, in Japan. Their first five albums were re-released by Asian Man Records, an American label well known for signing Asian punk-pop bands. Their final album, Potshot Beat Goes On, was released in May 2005. Potshot disbanded in 2005, playing a final show in Tokyo.

== Main ==
=== Group members ===
- Ryoji Ariga - vocals
- Yoshito Hirai - bass guitar
- Yoshinobu Takegoshi - T-bone

=== Pots and Shots ===
In reviewing their first album, Pots And Shots (1997), AllMusic wrote that Potshot "put the spurs to the largely kind-of-boring mid-'90s resurgence of ska music by revving up the tempos by at least 30 percent (seriously, anyone who tries dancing to a song like the breakneck "Since Yesterday" is at risk of a coronary) and dialing back all the cod-reggae Jamaican-isms that make so many of the frat-boy third wave ska bands so laughable. The drumbeat and a familiar-sounding horn section are Pots and Shots' only links to ska music, but they're enough to shred 90 percent of the post-No Doubt pretenders."

Pots And Shots included cover versions of "The Tears of a Clown" and "Since Yesterday".

== Discography ==
- Pots and Shots (October 14, 1997 - Asian Man Records)
- Rock ’n’ Roll (March 9, 1999 - Asian Man Records)
- Til I Die (October 7, 2000 - Asian Man Records)
- A Go Go (February 19, 2002 - Asian Man Records)
- Potshot is My Everything: Singles 1996-2003 (TV Freak)
- Dance to the Potshot Record (June 22, 2004 - Asian Man Records)
- Six Potshot Rockers (October 8, 2003 - TV Freak)
- Potshot Beat Goes On (May 16, 2005 - TV Freak)
- Potshot Forever: Best and Rarities (August 24, 2005 - TV Freak)
- Do It Again with Potshot (mini-album) (October 7, 2015 - UK Project)
