= Smoke Two Joints =

Song by The Toyes
- Released: 1983
- Genre: Reggae
- Songwriters: Chris Kay, Michael Kay

"Smoke Two Joints" is a song originally written by the Toyes, who performed it in a traditional reggae style and released it in 1983. According to the Toyes, "one fine fall day on a small island" of Oahu in Hawaii, two of the band members, Mawg and Sky, were sitting under a large banyan tree on Kuhio Beach, "tokin' on some sweet bud & jammin' on a rootsy reggae funky town" when they conceived the song "Smoke Two Joints".

It was featured on the soundtrack for the 1998 American comedy-thriller film Homegrown. The Toyes' version was featured in the 2005 video game NARC. The song is often mistakenly attributed to Bob Marley on internet and file sharing networks. Marley had been dead two years when this song was written.

== Nardini version ==
Norman Nardini, based in Pittsburgh, Pennsylvania, created two or more cover versions of this song in the 1980s. One was on a studio LP, and another was a version featured on his live CD from 1994, both produced by Circumstantial Records, based in New York City. Nardini first came across the song in 1983 when his friend Stush brought home the 45 as part of the music he had bought during a vacation in Hawaii. Nardini had his band learn it at once and has been performing the song for over twenty years. He wanted to air a cover version on CBS in the 1980s, but the label could not track down the original writers.

== Sublime version ==
The punk/ska band Sublime performed a cover version on their 1992 debut album 40oz. to Freedom. "Smoke Two Joints" was one of the first Sublime songs to be played on the radio after "Date Rape". This cover includes samples taken from the film Beyond the Valley of the Dolls (though this intro is typically removed when the song is played on the radio), of a bong being used, and of the artists Eazy-E and Just Ice. Bert Susanka, lead singer of the Ziggens (a major influence on Sublime), is also sampled saying, "Smoked cigarettes 'til the day she died!". The track is also featured in the 2003 film Grind and is on the Grind motion picture soundtrack as a somewhat shorter version. The track is also used in the film Mallrats when the contestants for a game show are passed out on the floor after being given marijuana by Jay and Silent Bob.

Sublime's version is featured in the Rocksmith 2014 video game as a DLC track.

== Other versions ==
- Richard Cheese performed a cover on his album Tuxicity.
- The ska punk band The Rudiments perform a cover of this song on the album Psychoska which is preceded by a clip from a Cheech and Chong movie.
- German band Ohrbooten covered it in German.
- German rapper Timi Hendrix covered it in German.
- Australian comedian, radio, and television presenter Doug Mulray created a cover version with The Rude band in 1986
- South Park Mexican created a cover version which can be found on The Purity Album.
- Afroman did a parody of the song called Smoke 2 Blunts
- Macy Gray released a cover of this song on her 2012 album Covered.
- Insanity Alert released a cover of this song on their 2019 album "666-Pack". This thrash metal crossover cover is the 13th Track called "Two Joints".
- Windjammer released a cover of this song on their 1998 album "The Best of Windjammer" which can be found here on YouTube.
