= The Bruce Lee Band =

American ska band

Bruce Lee Band
- Origin: California, United States
- Genres: Ska, acoustic, pop-punk
- Years active: 1995–2005; 2013–present
- Labels: Asian Man Records; Really Records
- Members: Mike Park; Jeff Rosenstock; Kevin Higuchi; Dan Potthast
- Past members: Chris Demakes; Roger Lima; Vinnie Fiorello; Derron Nuhfer; Matt Embree; Steve Choi; Steve Borth; Joe Troy; Chris Tsagakis; Chris Sheets; Mike Huguenor; Ted Moll; Chris Diebold; Chris Candy; Gerry Lundquist; John DeDomenici
- Website: www.mikeparkmusic.com

The Bruce Lee Band (or B. Lee Band) is the name given to the releases of Mike Park and his backing band which up until 2005 included members of Less Than Jake and the Rx Bandits. As of 2014, the collective consisted of touring and recording members from Skankin' Pickle, MU330, Hard Girls, The Chinkees, Bomb the Music Industry, The Arrogant Sons of Bitches, among others. In an interview with New Noise Magazine, Park stated that the band was originally conceived with Jeff Rosenstock at Park's house. “We were listening to Operation Ivy’s Energy. I think we listened to the Suicide Machine’s first album too. And we’re just like, ‘Let’s record a ska punk record!'”

The music played by Bruce Lee Band spans nearly all subgenres of ska music. Their 2005 release, Beautiful World, showcased a heavily two-tone influenced sound, using exclusively clean guitar and unusual song structure. In contrast, the debut release features more third-wave qualities, and a sound that was very typical of 1995—the year in which it was released.

Park has also used the name the B. Lee Band at times, in order to avoid legal complications with the estate of the late Bruce Lee. The first album was released under the name Bruce Lee Band and Lee's brother Robert, who happened to be the manager of the CD manufacturing plant responsible for pressing the album, contacted Park informally to warn him that Bruce Lee's name and likeness were copyrighted by the Bruce Lee Foundation and offered the friendly suggestion that Park change the band's name. Later pressings of the album were released under the B. Lee Band name.

Their Community Support Group EP was released January 28, 2014 on Really Records and introduced a new lineup that includes Jeff Rosenstock, Mike Huguenor, and Kevin Higuchi. Later on that year, the band released "Everything Will Be Alright, My Friend." The band played a few shows in California in 2014, along with the New Generation of Ska Festival in South Korea. In 2019, Mike Park posted a picture on social media indicating that the band was working on new material. Featured in the picture were Dan Potthast, Mike Park, Kevin Higuchi and Jeff Rosenstock. Trombonist Gerry Lundquist of MU330 and Skankin' Pickle and John DeDomenici of Bomb the Music Industry! frequently perform live with the band as well.

== Releases ==
Year	Title	Label
1995	The Bruce Lee Band	Asian Man Records
2005	Beautiful World EP	Asian Man Records
2014	Community Support Group EP	Really Records
2014	Everything Will Be Alright, My Friend	Asian Man Records
2019	Rental!! Eviction!!	Asian Man Records
2021	Division in the Heartland EP	Asian Man Records
2022	One Step Forward. Two Steps Back.	Asian Man Records
