= North Hangook Falling =

Studio album by Mike Park
- Released: August 23, 2005
- Recorded: January 2005
- Genres: Acoustic, indie rock
- Length: 38:45
- Label: Asian Man Records/Sub City Records
- Producer: Mike Park

Mike Park chronology
For the Love of Music (2003)	North Hangook Falling (2005)

Professional ratings
Review scores
Source	Rating
Punknews.org	link
Aversion.com	link
TheMusicEdge.com	B− link
PastePunk.com	mediocre link

North Hangook Falling is the second solo album by Mike Park. The title translates to "North Korea Falling" in English. The album was recorded in a week in January 2005 at a total cost of $2,800. The album is predominantly acoustic in feel, though there is some use of electric instrumentation.

== Track listing ==
1. "Is It Safe for Me to Go Outside?" – 2:46
2. "Keeping This Seat Warm" – 2:35
3. "Born to Kill" – 2:47
4. "Crazed Man" – 3:13
5. "Asian Prodigy" – 3:43
6. "Kiss Me Baby, I'm Always Here for You" – 4:17
7. "Korea Is So Far Away" – 3:32
8. "I Can Hear the Whisperings" – 2:48
9. "Dear Canada" – 3:04
10. "When Is the Moment That You'll Sing?" – 2:58
11. "North Hangook Falling" – 4:25
12. "Blue Marble" (live) – 2:30

== Personnel ==
- Mike Park: Acoustic Guitar, Vocals
- Pat Ford: Electric/Acoustic/Bass Guitars, Background Vocals
- Rob Kellenberger: Drums/Percussion, Background Vocals
- Jenny Choi: Cello, Keyboards
- Jason Flaks: Electric Guitar
- Steve Borth: Background Vocals
