= Skankin' Pickle =

American ska punk band

Background information
- Origin: San Jose, California
- Genres: Ska punk, third wave ska, punk rock
- Years active: 1989–1996
- Labels: Dill Records; Asian Man Records; Dr. Strange Records
- Past members: See: Skankin' Pickle member line-ups

Skankin' Pickle was an American ska punk band formed in San Jose, California that was active from 1989 to 1997.

== Biography ==
Skankin' Pickle first formed in December 1988, made up of students from Westmont High School and Los Gatos High School. The band, consisting of bassist and vocalist Mike Mattingly, saxophonist and vocalist Mike Park, guitarist and vocalist Lynette Knackstedt, and Drummer Chuck Phelps, played its first show on April 28, 1989. The group recruited trombonist Lars Nylander several months later, then continued as a five-piece until the addition of second trombonist Gerry Lundquist in early 1990.

In 1991, Park formed Dill Records, based out of San Jose, California, to release Skankin' Pickle's material, beginning with their debut album, the half-live, half-studio Skafunkrastapunk. Dill Records would later go on to release early material by Mu330, Slapstick, The Rudiments and Less Than Jake. Throughout their career, Skankin' Pickle adhered to a strict independent ethic, performing only all-ages shows, $5–$7 cover charges and selling their CDs for no more than $8 (Park would carry this DIY ethos over to his future bands and record labels).

Skankin' Pickle toured full-time throughout the early 1990s, playing shows with such acts as Bad Manners, The Skatalites, Mustard Plug, Sublime, Let's Go Bowling, Cherry Poppin' Daddies, The Mighty Mighty Bosstones, Rancid, The Queers, Primus, Mr. Bungle, Bad Religion and Green Day. The band strove to make their live shows as energetic and entertaining as possible, with the members dancing manically about the stage and engaging in such antics as baton-twirling and onstage wrestling matches. In 1994, SF Weekly voted Skankin' Pickle as one of the best unsigned bands in the Bay Area.

The band released their final studio album, The Green Album, on Dr. Strange Records in 1996, a collection of cover songs and newly recorded versions of previously unreleased tracks. Shortly after its release, Mike Park chose to leave the band (news of which he announced in the album's liner notes), being replaced by Mike Liu of the Santa Clara ska punk band Janitors Against Apartheid. The group went through more member changes in the following months until only Knackstedt and Nylander remained from the "classic" line-up, though continued to perform as Skankin' Pickle for their final tour in Europe in June 1997. Following this tour, the title of Skankin' Pickle was retired as the current line-up (featuring former members of Monkey and The Rudiments) continued touring, re-inventing themselves as the ska punk/pop punk band the 78 RPM's.

=== Post Skankin' Pickle ===
Knackstedt and Nylander continued playing in the 78 RPM's, recording two albums before disbanding in 2003. Following his departure, Mike Park founded his own independent record label Asian Man Records and later went on to form the ska punk bands The Chinkees and The Bruce Lee Band before branching out as a solo acoustic artist. Gerry Lundquist became a member of the St. Louis ska punk ensemble Mu330 in 1996 and Jay Vance formed the robot-themed rock band Captured! by Robots.

Mike Mattingly created former band Neosoreskin and the Deviled Egg Heads Music label. He currently performs solo shows and continues to write, record and release albums under the name Tingly, including the acoustic album Beautiful View.

On December 7, 2007, Lynette Knackstedt died in San Francisco from a drug overdose. On April 19, 2008, a benefit show was staged in her memory at 924 Gilman Street, featuring a number of local bands and headlined by Mike Park. The evening concluded with Park and Lundquist joining Monkey on stage and performing Skankin' Pickle songs. The benefit concert raised a net profit of nearly $2,000, which was donated to the Ohlhoff Recovery Programs, a Bay Area rehabilitation foundation.

On November 20, 2010, Park, Lundquist and Nylander, backed by the band Monkey, performed at the San Francisco stop of the Yo Gabba Gabba! live tour, playing a cover of the Marcia Griffiths/Bad Manners song "Feel Like Jumping".

== Musical style ==
Skankin' Pickle was unique for their unconventional melding of various genres: though primarily recognized and categorized as ska punk, the group frequently utilized elements of traditional ska, punk, funk, hardcore punk, rock, metal, reggae, rap, hip-hop, speed metal and polka into their music. Though after the departure of front man Mike Mattingly, Mike Park was generally regarded as the front man, songwriting responsibilities were evenly distributed throughout the band; lead vocals were usually split between Park, Knackstedt, Nylander and Mattingly/Miller, though the remainder of the members had sung lead on at least one recording.

Lyrically, the band also showcased diversity, ranging from silly, comedy-oriented songs ("Fakin' Jamaican") to serious and sociopolitical ("Racist World"), promoting racial equality and unity, often touching upon then-current events such as David Duke's 1992 presidential campaign ("David Duke is Running For President") and the racial controversy surrounding Ice Cube's album Death Certificate ("Ice Cube, Korea Wants A Word With You"). Most of the latter songs were written by Park, who would continue to write about themes of anti-racism in The Chinkees, The B. Lee Band and his solo work.

== References in other bands' work ==
On Alkaline Trio's Halloween at the Metro DVD, Matt Skiba references Skankin' Pickle while playing "Goodbye Forever": "Remember last April when we saw Skankin' Pickle; Somehow the singer showed the Fireside exactly how I feel"

Canadian punkers Fucked Up have a diss track about fellow Canadian rock band Billy Talent in which they reference Skankin' Pickle twice - a nod to Billy Talent's previous ska punk incarnation known as Pezz.

On Sublime's rarities box set Everything Under the Sun, front-man Bradley Nowell mentions Skankin' Pickle in an interview with WBCN Boston (Disc 2, Track 12):
WBCN - "...so, welcome to town. Playing TT's tonight, in Cambridge..."
Nowell - "With Sprung Monkey."
WBCN - "With Sprung Monkey?"
Nowell - "I mean Skankin' Pickle. I'm sorry, I always confuse the two."
WBCN - "Heh, heh, heh... It's easy to do..."
Nowell - "Skankin' Pickle is way better than Sprung Monkey..."

== Band members ==
=== 1989–1993 ===
- Lynette Knackstedt - guitar, vocals
- Gerry Lundquist - slide trombone, vocals
- Mike "Mr. Clean" Mattingly - bass, vocals
- Lars "Slim" Nylander - valve trombone, vocals
- Mike "Bruce Lee" Park - tenor saxophone, vocals
- Chuck "Mod" Phelps - drums

=== 1993–1996 ===
- Lynette Knackstedt - guitar, vocals
- Gerry "Hulk Hogan"/"Lungs" Lundquist - slide trombone, vocals
- Ian "Guru" Miller - bass, vocals
- Lars Nylander - valve trombone, vocals
- Mike "Bruce Lee" Park - saxophone, vocals
- Chuck Phelps - drums

=== Post-Green Album (early 1996) ===
- Lynette Knackstedt - guitar, vocals
- Mike Park - saxophone, vocals
- Gerry Lundquist - slide trombone, vocals
- Jay Vance - bass, vocals
- Lars Nylander - valve trombone, vocals
- Chuck Phelps - drums
- Michael Liu - saxophone

== Discography ==
=== Albums ===
Year	Title	Label
1991	Skafunkrastapunk	Dill Records
1992	Skankin' Pickle Fever	Dill Records
1994	Sing Along With Skankin' Pickle	Dill Records / Asian Man Records
1995	Skankin' Pickle Live	Dill Records
1996	The Green Album	Dr. Strange Records

=== Demos ===
Year	Title	Label	Tracks
1990	Skankin' Pickle cassette	Dill Records	1. "I Missed the Bus"; 2. "Pseudo Punk"; 3. "Hand Twister"; 4. "World's Falling Down"; 5. "Burn't Head"; 6. "Nuclear Dance Bomb"; 7. "Anxiety Attack"; 8. "My Hair (Look Like Dahn)"; 9. "Peter Piper & Mary"; 10. "Shark Teaser"; 11. "Whatever Happened"; 12. "I've Had Enough"; * all unreleased versions

=== Singles/EPs ===
Year	Title	Label	Tracks
1991	Fever	Beach Recordings	Side A: "I Missed the Bus"/"David Duke is Running for President"; Side B: "Ice Cube, Korea Wants a Word with You"/"Pass You By"
1995	Hi, My Name Is Eric Yee. My Favorite Band Is Green Day!	Dill Records	Side A: "My Name Is Eric Yee. My Favorite Band Is Green Day"/"Losin' Again"; Side B: "Sally Brown"
