= Libido (Buck-O-Nine album) =

Studio album by Buck-O-Nine
- Released: March 16, 1999
- Recorded: 1999
- Genre: Ska punk
- Label: TVT
- Producer: Stiff Johnson, Howard Benson, Buck-O-Nine

Buck-O-Nine chronology
Pass the Dutchie (1998)	Libido (1999)	Hellos & Goodbyes (2000)

Professional ratings
Review scores
Source	Rating
AllMusic	3/5 stars
Calgary Herald	3/5 stars
The Hamilton Spectator	3/4 stars

Libido is the fourth album by the American ska punk band Buck-O-Nine, released in 1999 on TVT Records.

== Production ==
The album marked an attempt by the band to broaden its traditional ska punk sound.

== Critical reception ==
The Hamilton Spectator wrote: "Mixing trumpets and trombones with hurry-up snare shots and scratchy guitar breaks, Buck-O-Nine prove that ska's hyperkinetic zeal still sounds pretty good when it's matched with a wry, knowing wink." The Calgary Herald thought that "if you live and die by the sound of suburban pseudo-angst with a tight horn section, this is manna from heaven ... If you're living in 1999—heck, even 1998—this already sounds nostalgic."

== Track listing ==
1. "Who Are They?" – 3:02
2. "Tell It Like It Was" – 3:20
3. "Something Funny" – 3:41
4. "Falling Back to Sleep" – 3:01
5. "Swimming in the Sand" – 2:58
6. "Sunlight" – 3:06
7. "Awkward Girl" – 2:54
8. "Headlines" – 3:45
9. "A Lot in My Head" – 2:37
10. "Here We Go Again" – 3:14
11. "All Along" – 2:57
12. "On a Sunny Day" – 2:51
13. "Pigeonhole Disease" – 2:47

== Credits ==
=== Performance ===
- Jon Pebsworth – Vocals
- Jonas Kleiner – Guitar
- Dan Albert – Trombone
- Anthony Curry – Trumpet
- Craig Yarnold – Tenor Sax
- Scott Kennerly – Bass
- Chuck Treece – Drums

=== Production ===
- Produced by Stiff Johnson and Buck-O-Nine
- Recorded at Big Fish Studios, San Diego, CA and assisted by Paul Waroff
- Additional production by Howard Benson on tracks 1,2,3,5,7,12
- Engineered by Stiff Johnson
- Additional engineering by Steve Kravac on tracks 1,2,3,5,7,12
- Tracks 1,2,3,5,7,12 mixed by Chris Lord-Alge
- Tracks 4,6,8,9,10,11,13 mixed by Kevin Shirley
- Mastered by Gavin at The Masteringlab
- Cover & band photography by Sean Murphy
- A&R - Leonard B. Johnson
