= Twenty-Eight Teeth =

Studio album by Buck-O-Nine
- Released: April 15, 1997
- Recorded: 1997
- Genre: Ska punk
- Length: 42:43
- Label: TVT
- Producer: Neill King, David Kershenbaum

Buck-O-Nine chronology
Water in My Head (1996)	Twenty-Eight Teeth (1997)	Pass the Dutchie (1998)

Singles from Twenty-Eight Teeth
- 1. "My Town" Released: 1997

Twenty-Eight Teeth is the third studio album by the American ska punk band Buck-O-Nine, released in 1997.

"My Town", about La Jolla, California, peaked at No. 32 on Billboard's Modern Rock Tracks chart. The album peaked at No. 190 on the Billboard 200.

Twenty-Eight Teeth sold more than 200,000 copies. The band promoted it by touring with Primus.

== Production ==
The album was produced by Neill King and David Kershenbaum. It contains a cover of Joe Jackson's "I'm the Man". "What Happened to My Radio?" is about the narrowing of radio playlists.

== Critical reception ==
Professional ratings
Review scores
Source	Rating
AllMusic	4/5 stars

The Record called the album "an infectious and energetic workout that avoids the same-rhythm rut that most bands of the snappy, staggered-tempo genre fall into." The San Diego Union-Tribune noted that "'Nineteen' is jet-powered by Jonas Kleiner's careening guitars, while 'My Town' gets its cheery bounce from Scott Kennerly's bobbing bass and Steve Bauer's swinging drums." The New Times Broward-Palm Beach praised the "full-throttle skacore ... where hyperactive ska grooves set the pace only to lurch into supercharged punk status come chorus time."

AllMusic wrote that "Buck-O-Nine needs to give more time to the horn section and engage in the kind of loopy interplay that made the Specials so interesting."

== Track listing ==
All songs written by Buck-O-Nine except "I'm the Man" written by Joe Jackson.

No.	Title	Length
1.	"Round Kid"	2:59
2.	"Nineteen"	2:55
3.	"Albuquerque"	3:33
4.	"Tear Jerky"	3:29
5.	"I'm the Man"	3:20
6.	"Jennifer's Cold"	2:59
7.	"Steve Was Dead"	2:00
8.	"What Happened to My Radio?"	2:32
9.	"Twenty-Eight Teeth"	2:48
10.	"You Go You're Gone"	3:07
11.	"Peach Fish"	3:24
12.	"Record Store"	3:26
13.	"My Town"	3:34
14.	"Little Pain Inside"	2:31

== Credits ==
=== Performance ===
- Jon Pebsworth - Vocals
- Jonas Kleiner - Guitar
- Dan Albert - Trombone
- Anthony Curry - Trumpet
- Craig Yarnold - Tenor Sax
- Scott Kennerly - Bass
- Steve Bauer - Drums
