= Talking Book (Macy Gray album) =

Studio album by Macy Gray
- Released: October 30, 2012
- Recorded: 2012
- Studio: Zappa Studios (Los Angeles, CA); Blue Zoux Studios (North Hollywood, CA); Platinum Sound Studios (New York, NY); Young Avenue Sound (Memphis, TN)
- Genre: R&B; soul; rock
- Label: Kobalt
- Producer: Hal Willner

Macy Gray chronology
Covered (2012)	Talking Book (2012)	The Way (2014)

Professional ratings
Review scores
Source	Rating
Allmusic	3/5 stars
Slant Magazine	4/5 stars

Talking Book is a Stevie Wonder tribute album by American recording artist Macy Gray, released on October 30, 2012 on Kobalt Records. It is a cover of Wonder's 1972 album of the same name.

== Track listing ==
All songs written by Stevie Wonder, except where noted.

1. "You Are the Sunshine of My Life" – 3:11
2. "Maybe Your Baby" – 4:22
3. "You and I (We Can Conquer the World)" – 3:10
4. "Tuesday Heartbreak" – 3:34
5. "You've Got It Bad Girl" (Wonder, Yvonne Wright) – 4:29
6. "Superstition" – 4:30
7. "Big Brother" – 3:41
8. "Blame It on the Sun" (Wonder, Syreeta Wright) – 3:47
9. "Lookin' for Another Pure Love" (Wonder, Syreeta Wright) – 3:51
10. "I Believe (When I Fall in Love It Will Be Forever)" (Wonder, Yvonne Wright) – 4:35

== Chart history ==
Chart (2012)	Peak position
US R&B Albums (Billboard)	65
