= Hellos and Goodbyes =

Hellos & Goodbyes

Live album by Buck-O-Nine
- Released: September 12, 2000
- Recorded: 1999
- Genre: Ska punk
- Label: Offramp
- Producer: Jon Pebsworth

Buck-O-Nine chronology
Libido (1999)	Hellos & Goodbyes (2000)	On a Mission (2001)

Hellos & Goodbyes by Buck-O-Nine was released in 2000 on Offramp Records, and consists of fifteen tracks recorded at a live performance in Japan in 1999, plus five previously unreleased studio tracks. This album features drummer Jeff Hawthorne, who became the band's permanent drummer in 1998, and bassist John Bell, who joined the band just a few weeks prior to their tour of Japan. In fact, Bell's first live performances with the band were on this tour. The studio tracks were recorded later in 1999, at the same studio where Libido was recorded. Offramp Records was a label started by singer Jon Pebsworth and his wife Laura. The label also released an album by The Scrimmage Heroes, band Buck-O-Nine toured with on its last U.S. tour. The tour ended prematurely when John Bell became ill and required emergency surgery. It was rated three stars by AllMusic.

== Track listing ==
1. "Sorry We're Late!" – 0:47
2. "Round Kid" – 2:50
3. "Who Are They?" – 2:47
4. "I'm the Man" – 2:54
5. "Falling Back to Sleep" – 2:59
6. "Tear Jerky" – 3:38
7. "Albuquerque" – 3:34
8. "Jennifer's Cold" – 3:02
9. "Here We Go Again" – 3:13
10. "Tell It Like It Was" – 3:25
11. "Calling in Sick" – 2:52
12. "Irish Drinking Song" – 2:15
13. "My Town" – 3:45
14. "Nineteen" – 2:58
15. "Barfly" – 3:43
16. "Lost and Down" – 2:52
17. "I've Got to Go" – 3:05
18. "Third Floor" – 4:04
19. "Something to Find" – 1:24
20. "Hellos and Goodbyes" – 2:19

== Credits ==
=== Performance ===
- Jon Pebsworth – Vocals
- Jonas Kleiner – Guitar
- Dan Albert – Trombone
- Anthony Curry – Trumpet
- Craig Yarnold – Tenor Sax
- John Bell – Bass
- Jeff Hawthorne – Drums

=== Production ===
- Produced by Jon Pebsworth
- Executive producer Laura Pebsworth
- Tracks 1–15 recorded live in Japan
- Tracks 16–20 recorded at Big Fish Studios, Encinitas, CA. Engineered by Ben Moore and mixed by Paul Waroff.
- Mastered at The Mastering Lab by Gavin Lurssen
- Artwork and design by Jonas Kleiner
