= The Murderburgers =

Scottish pop-punk band

- Origin: Scotland
- Genres: Pop-punk, punk rock
- Years active: 2007–2019, 2025–present
- Labels: Asian Man Records, Monster Zero, Brassneck Records
- Members: Fraser Murderburger
- Website: https://themurderburgers.wixsite.com/official

The Murderburgers are a Scottish pop-punk band formed in 2007 by singer, guitarist, and songwriter Fraser Murderburger. The band released three studio albums through the American independent label Asian Man Records between 2013 and 2019, and toured in Europe, North America, and Japan. The band went on hiatus at the end of 2019 before returning to activity in 2025.

== History ==
=== Formation and early releases (2007–2012) ===
Fraser Murderburger formed the band in February 2007. The first line-up, which included his brother on guitar, changed soon afterwards, and the group settled into a three-piece format. The band's line-up changed over the following decade, and by 2016 Fraser was the only founding member remaining.

The band's early full-length releases included Burned Out, Worn Out (2010) and How to Ruin Your Life (2012). The latter was issued by Monster Zero and All In Vinyl, and was reissued with bonus tracks by Asian Man Records in 2014. Material from this period was later collected on the compilation Old Bullshit, Rare Bullshit, Previously Unreleased Bullshit & Live Bullshit (2007–2013).

=== Asian Man Records (2013–2018) ===
In 2013 the band signed to Asian Man Records. According to Fraser, the signing came about after the band played with Joyce Manor, whose singer Barry Johnson offered to recommend them to the label. These Are Only Problems was released in October 2013 by Asian Man and the European label Monster Zero. The release coincided with a United States tour that included an appearance at The Fest 13 in Gainesville, Florida.

The 12 Habits of Highly Defective People was released by Asian Man in 2016. It was recorded with producer Matt Allison at Atlas Studios in Chicago, with Zach Gontard of Dear Landlord and two members of Masked Intruder playing as session musicians. An EP, Shitty People & Toothache, and a split 7-inch with the American band City Mouse followed in 2018.

=== What a Mess and hiatus (2019) ===
What a Mess was released in March 2019 by Asian Man Records, Brassneck Records, Umlaut Records, and Waterslide Records. It was written in early 2018 and recorded in Edinburgh that summer. During 2019 the band toured the United States, and toured Europe with Joyce Manor.

In mid-2019 Fraser announced that the band would begin an indefinite hiatus at the end of the year, after completing its remaining dates, which included a UK and European tour with Off With Their Heads. He cited more than a decade of continuous touring and his wish to write for a new band.

=== Return (2025–present) ===
In 2025 the band announced that it was active again, with two shows that year and more planned for 2026. A demo of "The Last Working Payphone on Your Street", the band's first new song in about six years, followed. The song appeared on a two-track 7-inch single, "Turning 35 Was an Embarrassment", released on 21 February 2026 by Brassneck Records in the UK and Anxious & Angry Records in the US.

== Discography ==
=== Studio albums ===
- Semi-Erect, Semi-Retarded, Semi-Detached (2009)
- Burned Out, Worn Out (2010)
- How to Ruin Your Life (2012)
- These Are Only Problems (2013)
- The 12 Habits of Highly Defective People (2016)
- What a Mess (2019)

=== Compilations ===
- Old Bullshit, Rare Bullshit, Previously Unreleased Bullshit & Live Bullshit (2007–2013)

=== EPs and singles ===
- Shitty People & Toothache (2018)
- Turning 35 Was an Embarrassment (2026)
