= Softball (band) =

- Origin: Funabashi, Japan
- Genres: Punk rock
- Years active: 1998–2003
- Labels: Asian Man Records; Einstein Records; Cutting Edge
- Spinoffs: Akiakane; The Babys
- Past members: Moe; Rie; Nomiya; Emi; Haruna

Softball was an all-female punk band from Funabashi, Chiba Prefecture, that formed in 1998. They released three albums, signing to both Japanese and American record labels, before disbanding in 2003.

== History ==
The original members of Softball — Moe (vocals/guitar), Nomiya (bass), and Rie (drums) — got together and formed the band while attending high school in Funabashi in March 1998. Mike Park signed them to Asian Man Records in America while in Japan they were signed to Einstein Records. Prior to their debut album, Tenkū, released in late 1999, the band released a self-titled EP and a mini-album, Kurage. Reviewing Tenkū, In Music We Trust called Softball "Japan's version of The Donnas with more punk driving them than pop."

Softball went on to tour Australia and Japan alongside Frenzal Rhomb as well as perform in Taiwan. In 2001, the band made their major label debut on Avex's Cutting Edge. Prior to the release of their second album, Lamp, the group had gone through some lineup changes. Original bassist Nomiya left Softball and was first replaced by Emi and then Haruna. Lamp was released on January 17, 2002, and reached a peak position of 20 on the Oricon Albums Chart. The record touched on the theme of war; Moe explained that she was inspired to write about it after seeing the February 28 memorial in Taiwan.

That August, the band released "Warawabe", a song with Japanese lyrics, as a single. It was backed by a cover of The Clash's "Washington Bullets" and charted on the Oricon Singles Chart, reaching number 50. In January 2003, Softball released their third studio album, Hakkōichiu, which peaked at number 32 on the Oricon chart. That February, they made an appearance at the Say Yes to Taiwan music festival in Taipei.

Softball disbanded in April 2003, following their tour to promote the album, which began the previous month. After the band dissolved, the members moved on to other projects. Moe formed Akiakane, another all-female punk band, that same year while Rie and Haruna would go on to form The Babys. Haruna would later join Che-a and Duncan's Divas.

== Discography ==
- Softball - 1999
- Kurage - 1999
- Tenkū - 1999
- Lamp - 2002
- Hakkōichiu - 2003
