= Young Punch =

Japanese band

Young Punch (ヤングパンチ, Yangu panchi) was a Japanese band formed in 1996.

In March 2000, Young Punch and Penpals released their split album, "Young Punch/Penpals", and in April–May went on tour together.

In August of that year, while still with BMG Funhouse, Young Punch founded a new label, FLATURBO. They made their major debut in November with the single "SUNDAY BEST".

The band split up in 2002.

== Members ==
- Takafumi Fukui (福井隆史) (Vocals)
- Yoshito Hirai (平井義人) (Bass/Vocals)
- Kentarō Shoda (庄田謙太郎) (Drums/Chorus)

== Discography ==
=== Singles ===
1. YOUNG WORLD (May 25, 1999/Libra Records)
2. NEO KIDS (March 8, 2000/VAP) Oricon #33
3. SUNDAY BEST (October 25, 2000/Arista Japan) Oricon #80
4. DISCONISTA (June 6, 2001/Arista Japan) Recut single
5. Fuwayura (フワユラ) (November 21, 2001/Arista Japan)
6. Love is in the air (May 29, 2002/BMG JAPAN)

=== Albums ===
1. YOUNG PUNCH/PENPALS (August 3, 2000/VAP) Oricon #33
2. DISCONISTA (May 23, 2001/Arista Japan) Oricon #58
3. Tracks (トラックス) (June 26, 2002/BMG JAPAN) Oricon #97
4. YOUNG PUNCH LIVE (September 25 2002/BMG JAPAN)

=== DVDs ===
1. YOUNG PUNCH LIVE (October 23, 2002/BMG JAPAN)
  1. Their last live performance, recorded at the LIQUIDROOM in Shinjuku on August 1, 2002.

== TV performances ==
- TBS "BLITZ INDEX" (May 26, 2001)
- TXN "Melodix!" (June 1, 2001 / December 11, 2001 / July 12, 2002)
- TBS "CDTV-Neo" (June 8, 2001)
