= Water in My Head =

EP by Buck-O-Nine
- Released: 1996
- Recorded: 1996
- Genre: Ska punk
- Label: Taang!
- Producer: Buck-O-Nine

Buck-O-Nine chronology
Barfly (1995)	Water in My Head (1996)	Twenty-Eight Teeth (1997)

Water in My Head is a Buck-O-Nine EP released in 1996 on Taang! Records, and features a recording of the classic Greek folk song Miserlou, recorded with members of Agent Orange.

== Track listing ==
1. "Water in My Head"
2. "Milk?"
3. "Dr. Kitch"
4. "Positively Shelby"
5. "Miserlou"

== Personnel ==
- Jon Pebsworth - Vocals
- Jonas Kleiner - Guitar
- Dan Albert - Trombone
- Anthony Curry - Trumpet
- Craig Yarnold - Alto Sax
- Scott Kennerly - Bass
- Steve Bauer - Drums
- Mike Palm - guitar on Miserlou

Recorded and mixed by Geoff Gibbs.
