= Hardball =

Hardball may refer to:

== Baseball ==
- Baseball, as opposed to its variant softball
- an English-language idiom derived from baseball, meaning to be or act tough or aggressive

== Arts and entertainment ==
=== Fictional characters ===
- Hardball, in the Avengers: The Initiative series from Marvel Comics
- Hardball, in the Fire from Heaven comics crossover event story arc
- Hardball, in G.I. Joe: A Real American Hero

=== Film ===
- Hardball (film), a 2001 American sports comedy-drama film
  - Hardball (soundtrack)
- Bounty Hunters 2: Hardball, a 1997 American/Canadian action film

=== Gaming ===
- HardBall!, an early baseball video game

=== Literature ===
- Hardball — How Politics is Played Told By One Who Knows the Game, a book by Chris Matthews
- Hardball, a comic book series written by Chuck Austen
- Hardball, a 2009 V. I. Warshawski novel by Sara Paretsky

=== Television ===
- Hardball with Chris Matthews, an American TV talk show
- "Hard Ball", a 2007 episode of 30 Rock
- Hardball (1989 TV series), an American crime drama
- Hardball (1994 TV series), an American baseball sitcom
- Hardball (2019 TV series), an Australian children's series
- Hardball, a BBC One game show hosted by Ore Oduba

== Other uses ==
- Hardball, a type of Gaelic handball
- Hardball (company), a Norwegian investment company
- Hard ball, a sugar stage in the making of candy and other confectionery

== See also ==
- Hardball squash, a racquet sport
