= Monkey (band) =

American third wave ska band

Monkey is a third wave ska band based in the San Francisco Bay Area. Their musical influences include the Skatalites, Prince Buster, the Specials, and non-ska artists such as: Elvis Costello, David Byrne and Tito Puente. Monkey has released six albums. The first two were independent releases, and the next three were on Asian Man Records. Their sixth album was released by SquidHat Records. Monkey’s debut album ¡Changito! was listed as San Jose's Best Independent Release for 1998. They have toured the United States, Canada, Mexico, Europe, and the United Kingdom, and have earned several nominations and awards, including winning the California Music Award (Bammie) in 1999.

Monkey's music can also be heard on several compilations, as well as movie and video game soundtracks.

== History ==
Monkey was formed in the summer of 1995, by Curtis Meacham and Kevin Miller. In 1997 Monkey's first full-length release, ¡Changito!, was released. The lineup of the band changed numerous times after this, with Meacham and Miller remaining. In 1999, they won a Bay Area Music award, or Bammy. Their second self-released album, Station Wagon Living came out during the "crash" of third wave ska. Co-founding member Miller left the band in 2001. Meacham, up until then lead singer and organ player, became the band's lead guitarist. Monkey were signed in 2004, and released their first label supported album, Cruel Tutelage on Asian Man Records. While touring Europe, they met up with Bad Manners in the U.K. They returned to the U.S. and toured as their backup band. In 2009, they released Lost at Sea. The album featured Kincaid Smith from Hepcat on trumpet, and the artwork was supplied by Parker Jacobs of Yo Gabba Gabba fame.

== Current lineup ==
- Curtis Meacham: Vocals/Guitar
- Micah Turney: Drums
- Brian Lockrem: Trumpet
- Dan Root: Saxophone
- Gabe Jimenez: Bass

== Previous members (partial list) ==
- Aadith Srinivasan: Bass (2016-2017)
- Aaron Blanding: Trumpet (1995–1996)
- Adam Brioza: Guitar/Vocals (1995–2001)
- Allen Teboul: Drums (1995–1996)
- Bob Furber: Saxophone (1997–1998) (R.I.P.)
- Bob Wilms: Saxophone (1999–2000)
- Bobby Miller: Saxophone (1998–1999)
- Brandon DuVall: Saxophone (2015–2016, 2019)
- Dave Borton: Trombone (1996-1997)
- Dustin James: Tbone/Org/Vox
- Donelle Cory Rippon: Bass (2003–2006 & 2016)
- Jimmy Boom: Drums (1999–2001)
- Jordan Schwarz: Bass (2014-2016)
- Kevin Miller: Bass/Vocals (1995–2001)
- Michael Merrill: Trumpet (1997–1999)
- Nikki Arias: trombone/flute (1996–1997)
- Matt Kolb: Drums (1998–1999)
- Rudy Sermeno: Bass (2007-2014)
- Sherri Biondi: Euphonium (1996-1997)
- Todd Bryan: Bass (2001–2003)

== Special guests (non-members) ==
- John Roy of Unsteady appears on Station Wagon Living
- Kincaid Smith of Hepcat appears on Lost At Sea
- Michael Valladares of Critical Mass appears on ¡Changito! and Station Wagon Living
- Roland Alphonso of The Skatalites performs the Tenor Sax solo on "Quemara" on the album ¡Changito!.

== Discography ==
DESCRIPTION	TRACK LISTING
¡Changito! (1998) Deluxe Entertainment This debut album from Monkey was recorded in 1997 at Studio J21 in San Jose, CA. It features 14 Ska and Reggae tracks, and a bonus hidden track (Working Man). The album won a California Music Award (BAMMIE) in 1998, and it features a performance by the late Skatalites saxophonist, Rolando Alphonso OD. Artwork by Kevin Miller	1. Bed of Fire; 2. Quemara; 3. Bomb; 4. Skamba; 5. Calle de Amor; 6. $30 Suit; 7. Bachelor; 8. Degobah; 9. Rude Forever; 10. Tommy No A GoGo; 11. The Mummy! 12. Soul Breakdown; 13. Cha-Cha Ska; 14. No Color, No Power
Station Wagon Living (2002) Deluxe Entertainment The follow-up to Monkey's first full length release was recorded at Studio B in Campbell, CA. It features 11 tracks that expand on the Ska and Reggae vibe, by adding elements of Swing, Rockabilly and Gospel styles. The album was released in 2002 on the Deluxe Entertainment label. It features guest work from John Roy (Unsteady), Micheal Valladarez (Critical Mass) and a guitar solo from George Glover (The Irradicats). Artwork by Curtis Meacham	1. The Get Go; 2. Dance of the Sexy; 3. 15th St. Ghetto Song; 4. ¿Rito?; 5. Tapwater; 6. Satellite; 7. Pride & the Animal; 8. Wax Lips & Pixie Stix; 9. She's My Girl; 10. Sound System; 11. Bryan Ryan
Cruel Tutelage (2005) Asian Man Records Monkey's third full-length release was recorded in several living rooms, garages and even a poolside hut. This lo-fi masterpiece has the soul of a band that was hitting its prime in a trying time for all independent artists. Artwork by Curtis Meacham https://monkeyska.bandcamp.com/album/cruel-tutelage	1. Summertime Sun; 2. Shanty Party; 3. You Don't Know; 4. Unity Dub; 5. Trailer Park Love; 6. Cruel Tutelage; 7. Attraction; 8. Simple Satisfaction; 9. Would you Wanna?; 10. Voice of America
Lost at Sea (2008) Asian Man Records This is the fourth full-length album from the classic Bay Area Ska band Monkey. It was recorded over a month-long session at Rockwell Sounds studio in Atascadero, CA by Engineer Brian Wallace. The album features guest performances from Kincaid Smith (Hepcat). Artwork by Parker Jacobs	1. Lost at Sea; 2. My Own Time; 3. Train Wreck; 4. In Demand; 5. Danska; 6. This Life; 7. Walking on Coals; 8. Hot Lunch; 9. Chemical Nation; 10. Scallywag
Bananarchy (2015) Asian Man Records The fifth Monkey album was recorded in San Jose, CA, and it comes barreling out of the gate with a much stronger and peppier Ska sound. Artwork by Parker Jacobs	1. You're becoming a Jerk...; (and no one likes you anymore); 2. Blind Faith; 3. The Epic; 4. The Curse; 5. Can of Worms; 6. Bicycle Song; 7. Bad Neighbor; 8. Caffeine; 9. Lazy Boy; 10. Johnny
Intermittent Waves (of unusual size and force) (2018) Squid Hat Records The sixth Monkey album was recorded in San Jose, CA, and it features a full historic look at all the reggae and ska styles, as well as guest performances from Dr. Ring Ding and Kincaid Smith (Hepcat). Artwork by Parker Jacobs	1. Intermittent Waves; 2. Hitchin' a Ride; 3. Sugartown; 4. Still Gonna Be...; 5. Glass Bottom Boat; 6. Rude Vibration; 7. Bossa; 8. Lover's War; 9. Bowling with Mr. G 9. Bassinet; 10. Lazy Boy

== Awards and nominations ==
- 1997 Wammie Nomination, SF Weekly
- 1998 Wammie nomination, S.F. Weekly
- 1998 Bammie nomination (Bay Area Music Award)
- 1999 California Music (formerly Bammie) Award Winner for 'Outstanding Ska Artist'
