= Barfly (album) =

Studio album by Buck-O-Nine
- Released: October 24, 1995
- Recorded: 1995
- Genre: Ska punk
- Label: Taang!
- Producer: Buck-O-Nine

Buck-O-Nine chronology
Songs in the Key of Bree (1994)	Barfly (1995)	Water in My Head (1996)

Barfly is the second album from Buck-O-Nine, originally released in 1995 on Taang! Records. The album contains several cover songs that influenced the band's individual members. The cover songs were narrowed down from a list of seven possible cover songs the band had rehearsed and performed live, having originally been picked round-robin style. The album is fleshed out with original songs written after the release of Songs in the Key of Bree.

== Track listing ==
1. "Callin' in Sick"
2. "On a Mission"
3. "Pass the Dutchie" (Musical Youth cover)
4. "Teenagers from Mars" (The Misfits cover)
5. "Water in My Head"
6. "Wrong 'Em Boyo" (The Clash cover)
7. "Away"
8. "Full Metal Bree"
9. "Junior"
10. "Still Remains"
11. "Sound System" (Operation Ivy cover)
12. "Barfly"
13. "Bonus Track"

== Credits ==
=== Performance ===
- Jon Pebsworth - Vocals
- Jonas Kleiner - Guitar
- Dan Albert - Trombone
- Anthony Curry - Trumpet
- Craig Yarnold - Alto Sax
- Scott Kennerly - Bass
- Steve Bauer - Drums

=== Production ===
- Engineered and mixed by Jeff Forest at DoubleTime Studios, San Diego, California
