= The Rudiments =

American ska punk band

- Also known as: Los Rudiments, Rudiments
- Origin: San Francisco, California, U.S.
- Genres: Ska punk
- Years active: 1990–1996
- Labels: Asian Man Records, Dill Records, Beach Recordings
- Past members: Brent Willson; Scott Pope; Craig Mazzera; Scott Rehlaender; Matt Powell; Andy Baker; Drew Morton; Craig Timms

The Rudiments are an American ska punk band from the East Bay, California, United States.

== Biography ==
Known originally as Los Rudiments the group came together in the early 1990s, getting their start playing such venues as Santa Clara's One Step Beyond club and Berkley's 924 Gilman Street. They were signed to Mike Park's Asian Man Records. They also worked with the Skankin Pickle's label, Dill Records, which also released albums by other ska/punk artists of the era, such as Less Than Jake, MU330, and Janitors Against Apartheid. They started out playing local shows and produced their first record, Psychoska. The band's most popular songs include "Wailing Paddle," "Trash," "Scapegoat," "Martians Don't Skank" and their cover of "Smoke 2 Joints." They had perfected the Swing Ska Punk sound culminating in the now infamous Great American music hall show with the Mighty Mighty Bosstones. Soon after this peak, singer Scott Rehlaender, drummer Craig Mazzera and organist Pat Phelan left the group prompting Matt Powell and Brent Wilson to take a lead role. With the addition of Scott Pope, one of the Bays hardest hitting drummers at the time, the band recorded Bitch Bitch Bitch, a record more centered on the punker side of their sound. With a national tour with Skankin Pickle including playing at Wetlands in New York City under their belt, the band had a solid fan base and they sallied fourth until Pope's accident. Noted influences of the band are: Operation Ivy, The Clash and The Stranglers.

In December 2004, drummer Scott Pope was riding his bicycle in San Francisco when he was struck by a car and went through the windshield. "I had it together enough to call my girlfriend, but after that I was out and woke up with a severed spine as a C7 quadriplegic." Brent went on to play in the 78 RMPS With Lynette & Lars of Skankin Pickle fame. After Lynett's death. The Impalers were born.

Their song "Wailing Paddle" was covered by the Boston ska punk band Big D and the Kids Table on their 2002 album The Gipsy Hill LP.

== Discography ==
- Psychoska - Dill Records
- Terror in the Heartland - Dill Records
- Bitch Bitch Bitch - Asian Man Records
- Rudiments: Circle Our Empire 1990-1993 - Asian Man Records
