= Lynette Knackstedt =

American singer

- Born: April 26, 1970; Santa Clara, California
- Died: December 7, 2007 (aged 37); San Francisco, California
- Occupation(s): Singer, record company executive
- Known for: Member of Skankin' Pickle

Lynette Christine Knackstedt (April 26, 1970 – December 7, 2007) was an American punk and ska musician, as well as a member of the band Skankin' Pickle.

== Early life ==
Knackstedt was born in Santa Clara, California. She graduated from Los Gatos High School in 1988. She attended De Anza Junior College and San Francisco City College.

== Career ==
Knackstedt was best known as a core member of Skankin' Pickle, a ska band formed in 1989, with her childhood friend Mike Park, Lars Nylander, Chuck Phelps, Gerry Lundquist and Mike Mattingly. She played guitar and was one of the band's vocalists. The band recorded five albums and toured the United States performing in the early 1990s. Knackstedt was also involved in running Dill Records, the band's independent record company, launched in 1991. After she and Nylander toured Europe as Skankin' Pickle in 1997, the band officially dissolved, but the pair continued performing as the 78 RPMs. She also performed with Lucifer's Strip Club Band.

The Skankin' Pickle track, "Rotten Banana Legs", which featured her vocals, was included on the 1997 compilation CD Ska Down her Way: Women of Ska, from Shanachie Records.

== Personal life and legacy ==
Knackstedt was out as a lesbian. She died from a drug overdose in 2007, in San Francisco, at the age of 37. Her Skankin' Pickle bandmates played a memorial show together in 2008, and raised money for a San Francisco drug rehabilitation program.
