= The Toyes =

American reggae band

- Also known as: The Toys
- Origin: Honolulu, Hawaii, United States
- Genres: Reggae
- Years active: 1982–present
- Label: Currently Unsigned
- Members: Mawg (Lead Guitar & Lead Vocals), B-dub (Rhythm Guitar & Vocals), John Trujillo (Bass & Vocals), Brian Rogers (Drums & Percussion)
- Past members: Santa Davis, Fully Fullwood, Jawge Hughes, Mike Dawson, Ricci Accardi, Barry Boudreau, Jimmy Paolantonio
- Website: www.thetoyes.com

The Toyes are an American reggae band based in Grants Pass, Oregon. Their style has been described as a "cross between Bob Marley and Barenaked Ladies". They are the original songwriters and recorders of the song "Smoke Two Joints". It was originally recorded in 1982, and was re-released on their 1993 debut album The Toyes. It was featured on the soundtrack for the 1998 American comedy-thriller film Homegrown. An influential version was recorded by the band Sublime; the song has since been mistakenly attributed to them or to Bob Marley. The Toyes also wrote and performed a song called "Monster Hash", a parody of Bobby "Boris" Pickett's "Monster Mash".

The Toyes are composed of Mawg on Lead Vocals and Lead Guitar, B-dub on Vocals and Rhythm Guitar, John Trujillo on Vocals and Bass Guitar and Brian Rogers on Drums.

== History ==
=== Early career (pre-1983) ===
Mawg (Jean-Christophe Kay) and his brother Sky (Michael Kay) were living together in Waikiki. Sky was working as a Pedi cab driver and Mawg was guitarist and vocalist in the Honolulu-based cover band, The Lifters.

In fall of 1982, Mawg and Sky were entertaining friends who had arrived at the home to take in the finest local herb. While jamming a rootsy groove and improvising lyrics, the hook of "Smoke Two Joints" came tumbling out to the delight of the party guests.

Seeing the response, Mawg and Sky completed the lyrics the following day while sitting under a large banyan tree on Kuhio Beach. Weeks later, Mawg performed the completed "Smoke Two Joints" with The Lifters. According to Mawg, "The crowd went wild and sang along. We played it 5 times that night after the crowd stopped our other songs in mid-performance by chanting 'Smoke Two Joints'." The tune had become an instant sensation.

Financed by their mother Paulette Kay, a French woman living in France, the Kay brothers immediately recorded the song and produced 500 45 RPM Vinyl discs. Joining them in the studio and rounding out the trio was 17-year-old Ricci Accardi, a local drummer. Having quit The Lifters, Mawg, Sky and Ricci joined up with singer Mike Dawson to form Tightrope, which they later renamed The Toys.

In late 1983 The Toys received a Cease and Desist letter from Motown Records' legal department threatening a lawsuit over the use of the name "The Toys", who were a signed act of Motown and who recorded "A Lover's Concerto". Wanting to avoid costly litigation with the recording giant, the brothers decided to add an "e" to their name, becoming The Toyes.

=== "Smoke Two Joints" success ===
On December 2, 1982, Mawg, Sky and Ricci went into modest Audio-Media Studios in downtown Honolulu to record “Smoke Two Joints” and a hastily made-up jam song, “Big Fat Mama”.

The sessions were produced by Mawg and Sky and engineered by the house recording engineer at Audio-Media, Ed Roy. The songs were recorded and mixed that same day, and the master was quickly sent to a vinyl pressing plant on the mainland Hawaii.

Mawg distributed the 45s at clothing stores, gift shops and convenience stores, as well as making the record available for sale at their live shows.

The record soon found its way into the hands of Andy Preston, the music director at 98 Rock KPOI-FM, Oahu’s top rock station and was featured in the station’s 5:00 PM feature “Top 5 at 5”. That month “Smoke Two Joints” usurped Michael Jackson and Journey as the #1 most requested song and held that position for ten months. KFOG in San Francisco picked up the song and made it a staple @ 5:00 p.m. every Friday afternoon as the weekend send-off.

The Toyes followed up their 45 RPM single by recording three more songs which were released as a 12" vinyl EP featuring "Smoke Two Joints", "Listen to the Radio", which was released as a second single and received moderate air play in Hawaii, "Never Wanna Go", which is the only Toyes track sung by Mike Dawson, as well as Mawg's solo acoustic guitar composition "Eddie's Theme".

The Toyes went on the road to support the new album touring the Hawaiian Islands and Guam.
