= The Chinkees =

- Origin: San Francisco, California, United States
- Genres: Ska punk
- Years active: 1997–2003, 2010, 2011, 2013, 2020
- Label: Asian Man

The Chinkees are an American ska punk band fronted by Mike Park (formerly of Skankin' Pickle). The group debuted with 1998's The Chinkees Are Coming!, and followed with 1999's Peace Through Music and 2002's Searching for a Brighter Future before a greatest hits album was released in 2003. According to the liner notes for the band's debut album The Chinkees Are Coming!, the music was recorded by members of the band Tuesday with vocals provided by Mike Park. Subsequent albums were recorded all or in part by members Park, Miya Osaki, Greg Alesandro, Jason Thinh, and Steve Choi, as well as "guest" musicians, including Slapstick and Tuesday drummer Rob Kellenberger and Link 80's Steve Borth, often with members trading and playing different instruments than listed. All of the members were involved with the ska/punk scene. Jason Thinh was from the band Short Round, Miya was a member of the Santa Cruz punk trio The Muggs, Greg Alesandro a member of San Jose band Statue Man, and Steve Choi later becoming a keyboardist and guitarist for Rx Bandits in 1999.

After the "Chinkees Are Coming" album was released in 1998, the newly recruited members of The Chinkees headed for some warm up dates in Mexico supporting Riverside punks Voodoo Glow Skulls and San Diego's Buck-O-Nine before going on their first tour of Japan in 1999, supporting Japanese ska punk legends Kemuri. After a short stint on the west coast with fellow Asian Man Records recording artists MU330 and the then up and coming Alkaline Trio, the band again headed to Japan in the spring of 2000 with label mates MU330, and Tokyo ska punks Potshot. Europe was next as the band took part in a summer 2000 tour dubbed "Monsters of Ska" with Link 80 and MU330. 2001 saw another Japanese tour, again in support of Potshot, as well as Detroit's Suicide Machines, followed the next year by a UK tour with Potshot, and the UK band Lightyear, which proved to be the last major undertaking of the band as it has remained on hiatus ever since.

Recently, there have been a few reunions by the Chinkees in 2010 and 2011, as well as playing at the Punks in Vegas concert in May 2013. In 2020, they released a new four song EP, "K.A. Music" on Asian Man Records. The lineup for K.A. Music consisted of Mike Park on lead vocals, Steve Choi on guitar and keyboards, Kevin Higuchi on drums, and Roger Camero on bass.

== Members ==
- Mike Park — vocals, guitar
- Miya Zane Osaki — bass, vocals
- Greg Alesandro — drums, guitars, bass, and vocals
- Jason Thinh — guitars
- Steve Choi — keyboards, drums, guitar
- Richard Morin — drums
- Kevin Higuchi — drums
- Roger Camero — bass

== Discography ==
- The Chinkees Are Coming (1998, Asian Man Records)
- Karaoke with the Chinkees EP (1998, Asian Man)
- Peace Through Music (1999, Asian Man)
- Present Day Memories (2001, split with The Lawrence Arms)
- Searching for a Brighter Future (2002, Asian Man)
- Plea for Peace:Best of the Chinkees (2003, Kung Fu Records)
- K.A. MUSIC EP (2020, Asian Man)
