= Japanese ska =

Japanese ska is ska music made in Japan. It is, along with its counterparts elsewhere in the world, part of what has been called the "third wave of ska [that] combines the traditional Jamaican Club sound with metal, punk, folk, funk, and/or country."

== Artists ==
Having been formed in the 1980s and enjoying international success (including extensive touring in the United States and Europe), the group Tokyo Ska Paradise Orchestra is arguably the original and best-known Japanese ska ensemble.

175R, Beat Crusaders, The Boom, Kemuri, Kojima, Lisa, Mongol800, Tsu Shi Ma Mi Re, Shaka Labbits, Gelugugu, Potshot, Yum!Yum!Orange, Yukihiro Takahashi, Ska Ska Club, Kasutera and Oreskaband are other Japanese artists that have performed ska (though not all exclusively).

Japan has had a proliferation of album-making ska bands. Besides those mentioned elsewhere in this article, one source lists the Clippers, Coke Head Hipsters, the Drops, Duck Missile, Fruity, Gelugugu, La Ppisch, Life Bal, Mustang AKA, Nicotine, Oi-Skall Mates, Piala, Rude Bones, Shoulder Hopper, Scafull King, Skatroits, Sprocket Wheel, Dallax, The Rollings, Step by Step, Sk@ymate's, Skapontas, Tropical Gorilla, midnightPumpkin, SPYZZ, and Young Punch.

== Characteristics ==
According to one music critic, Japanese ska "music translates well, as they have fully embraced the Western horned-based ska idiom". Another remarks "from traditional ska to ska-punk, Japan has a thriving scene that is ready to invade America.

A source at MIT describes:

Although far less popular than J-pop, J-rock (Japanese rock), or electronica, ska music has a definite presence in Japan. Emerging about a decade ago with forerunner bands Ska-Flames and Tokyo Ska Paradise Orchestra, the Japanese ska scene saw a huge popular surge in 1997 (mirroring the burst of popularity in the United States) which quickly died out. However, many Japanese ska bands continue to persist despite a lack of mainstream support. The Determinations, The Side Burns, and Blue Beat Players are Japanese ska bands popular among fans of the genre.

In Japan, both Japanese and traditional Jamaican ska enjoy some popularity. An article in Jamaica Observer quoted a Japanese music seller as saying:

Ska is very big in Japan and we have about five Japanese ska bands in my city. We just had Prince Buster performing there [...] Japanese people love Ska [...] in fact, they love every period of music from Jamaica.

A Japanese pop authority remarked that some see:

...similarities between the highly stylized "skanking" dance style associated with ska music and Japanese "bon odori" festival dances. (Ska music and ska-punk have long been favorites in Japan, and today there are countless Japanese ska and ska-punk bands.) And reggae’s syncopated rhythms are echoed in the rhythm of Okinawan music -- so much so that Okinawa music is sometimes called "Japanese reggae."

Although the Japanese ska scene is centered in Tokyo there are ska venues elsewhere in Japan, even in smaller cities such as Kisarazu in Chiba Prefecture.

== Classification ==
While some sources (such as one of the quotes above) discern Japanese ska from Japanese pop, other sources lump them together. While this classification is contrary to the fact that ska and punk music are rarely, if ever, classified as pop music in most of the world, it is congruous with the practice of considering Japanese pop to encompass other genres which are often regarded as separate from pop music in the United States and Europe, among them rock, urban and electronic dance music.

The consideration of Japanese ska as a subgenre of Japanese pop may be due, at least in part, to bands typically considered ska releasing songs with a definite pop music sound. Sometimes, this genre-spanning occurs within a single song. For example, Snail Ramp (a "typical ska punk" band from Tokyo) has a song called "Hotaru no Hikari" featuring Air. For the most part, this is a ska punk version of "Auld Lang Syne" with Japanese lyrics. Sections of the song, however, divert from this musical form and instead have a sound akin to boy band music. (Note: This sort of stylistic departure, when it occurs in American and European punk music, may be regarded as ironic and may even be so in this case.)

According to the filing scheme used at Tower Records in Tokyo, all Japanese ska is classified as hardcore, even that with the laid-back sound that typifies early Jamaican ska music from the early 1960s.

== See also ==
- Enka
- Ryūkōka
- Group Sounds
- J-pop
