= MU330 =

American ska punk band

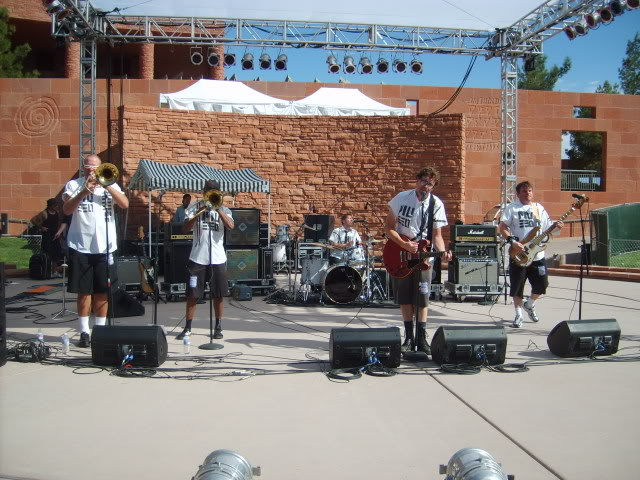
- MU330 performing live at the 2007 International Ska Circus in Clark County, Nevada

Background information
- Origin: St. Louis, Missouri, U.S.
- Genres: Ska punk; punk rock; indie rock
- Years active: 1988–present
- Label: Asian Man Records
- Members: Dan Potthast; Ted Moll; Chris Diebold; Robert Bell; Gerry Lundquist

MU330 is an American ska punk band from St. Louis, Missouri. Formed by students of St. Louis University High School in 1988, MU330 played a self-described brand of music called "psycho ska", high energy ska punk marked by manic performances and humorous, often strange lyricism.

Since 1997, the band's musical direction has changed towards a more melodic and lyric-driven ska / indie rock sound, a combination that has been described as "Weezer meets The Specials". This style was noted in a 2022 review.

Dan Potthast (guitar/vocals), Ted Moll (drums), Chris Diebold (bass guitar), and Robert Bell (trombone) have remained with MU330 since the band's inception, and the trombonist Gerry Lundquist has been a member for over two decades. There have been several different frontmen in the past, but Potthast has always been the band's principal songwriter and lyricist.

== Biography ==
The original members met in St. Louis University High School music class 330, hence the band's name. They learned to play instruments and practiced in the basement of Moll's grandmothers home, and started to get gigs at schools in St. Louis. Their musical style was later influenced by the Specials, Madness, Bad Manners, the Toasters, and Special Beat.

Potthast has released solo work and has also started a second band, The Stitch Up, with former Slow Gherkin frontman James Rickman. He also formed a ska/rocksteady group called Dan P and the Bricks with former the MU330 saxophonist, Matt Knobbe.

In 2018, Potthast was part of Jeff Rosenstock's touring band. Moll, the drummer, has a side project band called Bagheera. Most members of MU330 have performed with Mike Park's the Bruce Lee Band throughout the band's history. Potthast played live with the Bruce Lee Band, for example, in 2024. MU330 continues to perform live sporadically across the United States.

== Band members ==
=== Press (up to 1994) ===
- John Kavanaugh – vocals, trumpet
- Dan Potthast – vocals, guitar
- Ted Moll – drums, vocals
- Chris Diebold – bass guitar
- Robert Bell – trombone
- Matt Knobbe – tenor saxophone

=== Chumps on Parade (1995–1997) ===
- Jason Nelson – vocals
- Dan Potthast – vocals, guitar
- Ted Moll – drums, vocals
- Chris Diebold – bass guitar
- Rob Bell – trombone
- Traygen Bilsland – saxophone
- Nick Baur – trumpet

=== 1997–present ===
- Dan Potthast – vocals, guitar
- Ted Moll – drums, vocals
- Chris Diebold – bass guitar
- Robert Bell – trombone
- Gerry Lundquist – trombone

== Discography ==
=== Albums ===
Year	Title	Label
1991	Salamander Stew	Self-released
1994	Press	Moon Ska Records / Asian Man Records
1996	Chumps on Parade	Dill Records / Asian Man Records
1997	Crab Rangoon	Asian Man Records
1999	MU330	Asian Man Records
1999	Winter Wonderland!	Asian Man Records
2002	Ultra Panic	Asian Man Records

=== Live albums ===
Year	Title	Label
2001	"Oh Yeah!" Live	Asian Man Records

=== Compilations ===
Year	Title	Label	Notes
1998	Best of MU330	California Roll	Japan-only compilation with four unreleased songs

=== Singles, demos, and non-album tracks ===
Year	Title	Label	Formats	Notes/Track(s)
1991	Salamander Stew	Self-released	Cassette	Demo recorded and mixed at Profound Sound
1996	"Jason" b/w "Now" 7″	Moon Ska Records		"Jason", "Now"
1997	MU330 / Blue Meanies Split 7″	Asian Man Records		"Vacation" (Caffey, Valentine, Wiedlin)
1998	Time Bomb EP 7″	H.Y.R.		"Hoosier Love", "LA", "Ireland"; Split with Punishment Park. Released only in Norway.
2000	DoppelPack (film soundtrack)			"Better than Pork" (Potthast), "Fat and Married"
2000	Metalliska: A Ska Tribute to 80's Metal	Too Hep		"Motorbreath" (Hetfield)
2007	Ska Is Dead Compilation CD	Asian Man Records		"Please Don't Run"
2017	Don't Worry Don't Stress	Asian Man Records	Digital	"Don't Worry Don't Stress"
