= Dill Records =

Record label

Dill Records was punk rock/ska record label founded by Mike Park in 1989. The name is a pun related to Park's band Skankin' Pickle, after it was formed to release the band's music, which was initially the label's only artist. It was based out of Monte Sereno, California and released CDs/records until 1998. The first other band with a release on Dill Records was the Tantra Monsters (Dill 006) in 1994, and would also release Pezcore, the debut album of Less Than Jake in 1995. After the breakup of Skankin' Pickle, Park began the label Asian Man Records. In a 1998 interview, he told Read Junk that since he had funded Dill records with his own money, the artists he had signed came with him to the new label. Asian Man and Dill Records coexisted until 1998. Asian Man re-released many albums originally released by Dill Records, as all releases are now out of print and Dill Records is no longer in operation.

A partial Dill Records discography:

Artist	Title	Catalog number
Skankin' Pickle	Skafunkrastapunk CD/cass	DILL 001 (reissued as DILL 0012 in 1997)
Skankin' Pickle	Skankin' Pickle Fever CD/cass	DILL 002 (reissued as DILL 0014 in 1997)
Skankin' Pickle	Sing Along with Skankin' Pickle CD/cass	DILL 003
Skankin' Pickle	Skankin' Pickle Live CD/cass	
Skankin' Pickle	Hi, My Name is Erik Yee. My Favorite Band is Green Day! 7"	
Slapstick	Lookit CD/cass	
The Tantra Monsters	s/t (12 songs) CD/cass	DILL 005 & DILL 006
Janitors Against Apartheid / One Eye Open	Nerds CD	DILL 007
MU330	Chumps On Parade CD	DILL 010
Los Rudiments	Psychoska CD	DILL 011
The Facet	Playing Second CD	DILL 015
Janitors Against Apartheid / One Eye Open	1 in 3,000 Nerds Can't Be Wrong CD	DILL 016
Various Artists	Dillinquents (Green)	DILL 019
Various Artists	Dillinquents (Red)	DILL 020
78 RPM's	Go EP	DILL 021
The Rabies	Want Me Back EP CD	DILL 022
78 RPM's	New World Chivalry CD	DILL 023
Less Than Jake	Pezcore CD/cass	DILL #5
Various Artists	Misfitz of Ska CD/cass	
