= Mike Park =

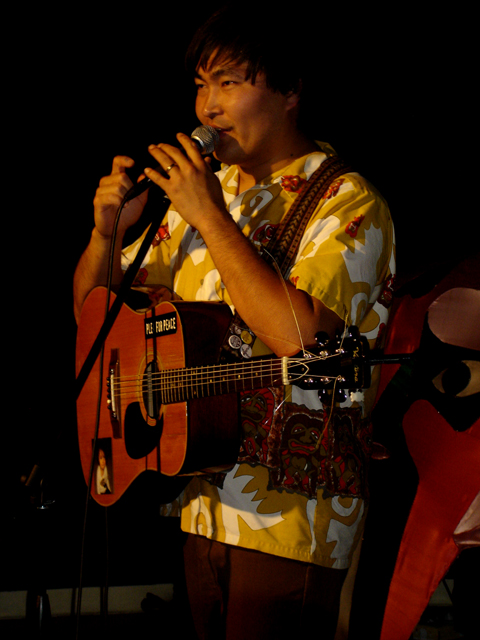
- Live at Arts at Mark's Garage, Honolulu, HI

Background information
- Born: Michael Brian Park; November 11, 1969 (age 56); Seoul, South Korea
- Genres: Ska punk, punk rock, indie rock
- Occupations: Musician, Songwriter, Producer, Label Owner
- Instruments: Vocals, Guitar, Saxophone
- Years active: 1985–present
- Labels: Asian Man; Dill; Dr. Strange; Simple Stereo; Sub City; Suburban Home

Michael Brian Park is an American Korean musician and progressive activist. His musical ventures include Skankin' Pickle for whom he both played the saxophone and sang, The Chinkees, The Bruce Lee Band, Kitty Kat Fan Club, Ogikubo Station, as well as an acoustic solo project under his own name. After his time with Skankin' Pickle he went on to found Asian Man Records, a label which he has run out of his garage in California since 1996 with only help from his parents and friends. Asian Man Records supports mostly ska and punk bands. Park has used Asian Man Records to release his own music, in addition to providing a start for smaller bands to allow them to grow, including Less Than Jake, Alkaline Trio, and The Lawrence Arms. In 1999 he formed the Plea for Peace Foundation an organization whose aim is "to promote the ideas of peace through the power of music", something which Park has been trying to do with his own bands and with the help of other groups.

Park was the impetus behind the Spring 1998 "Ska Against Racism" tour. The goal of the tour was to promote awareness about racism and raise money for anti-racism organisations such as the Museum of Tolerance. The national tour included The Toasters, Less Than Jake, the Blue Meanies, Mustard Plug, Five Iron Frenzy, MU330, Kemuri, and Mike Park himself.

== Plea for Peace Foundation ==
The Plea for Peace Foundation was founded in 1999 by musician and founder of Asian Man Records, Mike Park. The Plea for Peace Foundations is a 501C3 Non-Profit Organization based in San Jose, California, in the United States. The organisation's stated goal is to "promote the ideas of peace through the power of music". Initially the foundation was only active in national and global music tours, but in 2007 it intends to open a youth center for children where they will be encouraged to "perform music, create art, dance and talk to others of similar interests".

In 2004, Plea for Peace organized a musical tour of the same name. The tour was a stand against President George W. Bush and the wars in Iraq and Afghanistan.

Plea for Peace also organized a bike tour in 2005, called the Bike for Peace tour. Mike Park and members of several bands including Lawrence Arms, Alkaline Trio, and MU330 biked from Olympia, Washington to San Diego over the course of a month to raise funds for a new youth center in Park's hometown of San Jose, California.

== Personal life ==
Park grew up in Silicon Valley in Northern California, where he still lives. He majored in music in college.

He is a Minister of the Universal Life Church.

== Discography ==
=== Solo ===
- Michael Park (Asian Man, 2001)
- For the Love of Music (Sub City, 2003)
- North Hangook Falling (Sub City, 2005)
- Mike Park 7 Inch and Art Print (Simple Stereo, 2008)
- Beans & Toast (2008)
- Mike Park/O Pioneers!!! split 7″ (Suburban Home, 2009)
- Smile (Asian Man, 2011)

=== With 'Skankin' Pickle' ===
| Year | Title | Label |
|---|---|---|
| 1991 | Skafunkrastapunk | Dill Records |
| 1992 | Skankin' Pickle Fever | Dill Records |
| 1994 | Sing Along With Skankin' Pickle | Dill Records |
| 1996 | Live | Dill Records |
| 1996 | The Green Album | Dr. Strange Records |

=== With 'The Chinkees' ===
- The Chinkees Are Coming CD
- Karaoke with the Chinkees 7"
- Peace Through Music CD
- Present Day Memories Split CD with Lawrence Arms (out of print)
- Searching for a Brighter Future CD

=== With 'The Bruce Lee Band' ===
| Year | Title | Label |
|---|---|---|
| 1995 | The Bruce Lee Band | Asian Man Records |
| 2005 | Beautiful World EP | Asian Man Records |
| 2014 | Community Support Group EP | Really Records |
| 2014 | Everything Will Be Alright, My Friend | Asian Man Records |
| 2019 | Rental!! Eviction!! | Asian Man Records |
| 2021 | Division in the Heartland EP | Asian Man Records |

=== With 'Ogikubo Station' ===
- Ogikubo Station S/P (Asian Man, 2017)
- We Can Pretend Like (Asian Man, 2018)
