= Asian Man Records =

American record label

- Founded: 1996
- Founder: Mike Park
- Genre: Punk rock; ska punk; pop punk; indie rock; emo
- Country of origin: US
- Location: Monte Sereno, California
- Official website: AsianManRecords.com

Asian Man Records is a DIY record label run by Mike Park in San Jose, California. Park started a record label and began releasing music in 1989 under the name Dill Records, with the Asian Man label established in May 1996.

== History ==
Asian Man Records were distributed by Mordam Records.

== Sublabels ==
In 2011, Park established the Fun Fun Records sublabel, which released children's music. As of 2015, artists on the Fun Fun label included Mike Park, Dan Potthast, Play Date, Kepi Ghoulie, Happy Wags, and Koo Koo Kanga Roo.

== Artists ==
The label specializes in mostly ska and punk. The first proper release by the label was Link 80's 17 Reasons and the label has since gone on to release recordings by punk heavyweights such as Alkaline Trio and Less Than Jake. Other artists released include:

=== Current ===
- Agung Gede
- The Abruptors
- Akiakane
- The Apers
- The Atom Age
- Bagheera
- Buck-O-Nine
- Chotto Ghetto
- Classics Of Love
- Coquettish
- Dan Andriano in the Emergency Room
- Dan P & The Bricks
- Dogbreth
- Dog Party
- Dowsing
- Duvall
- Grant Olney
- Great Apes
- Grumpster
- Guerilla Poubelle
- Hard Girls
- The Hot Toddies
- Kepi Ghoulie
- Kevin Seconds
- Lektron
- Matt Skiba
- Mike Park
- Monkey
- The Murderburgers
- Nicotine
- Pacing
- The Queers
- Short Round
- Small Crush
- Smoking Popes
- Spraynard
- Sundowner
- Sweet Gloom
- Teens in Trouble
- The Smith Street Band
- The Taxpayers
- Unsteady
- The Wild
- Wild Moth
- Yoko Utsumi

=== Former ===
- Ahiro
- AJJ (active with Hopeless Records)
- Alkaline Trio (active with Rise Records)
- Angelo Moore
- Astropop 3
- Ben Weasel
- Big D and the Kids Table (active with SideOneDummy Records)
- Blue Meanies (disbanded)
- Bomb The Music Industry! (disbanded)
- Boom Boom Satellites
- The Broadways (disbanded)
- The Bruce Lee Band
- The Chinkees
- Chris Murray
- Colossal (disbanded)
- Dan Potthast (active with Pentimento Music Company)
- Ee (active with Actually Records)
- Five Iron Frenzy
- Good for Cows
- The Honor System
- Johnny Socko
- Just a Fire
- Joyce Manor (active with Epitaph Records)
- King Apparatus
- Knowledge
- Korea Girl
- Laura Stevenson & The Cans (re-release only)
- The Lawrence Arms (active with Epitaph Records)
- Lemuria
- Less Than Jake (re-releases only)
- Let's Go Bowling
- Link 80
- Little Jeans
- Mealticket
- The Methadones
- MU330
- Noise By Numbers
- No Torso
- O Pioneers!!!
- Pama International
- The Peacocks
- The Plus Ones
- Polysics
- Potshot (disbanded)
- Pushover
- The Riptides
- Riverdales
- The Rudiments
- Satori
- Screeching Weasel (re-releases only)
- Shinobu
- Skankin' Pickle
- Slapstick
- Slow Gherkin
- Softball
- Squirtgun
- Teen Idols
- Ten in the Swear Jar
- The Toasters
- Toys That Kill
- Tuesday
- WARDOGS

== Compilation CDs ==
Year	Album	Notable Artists
1997?	"Anti-Racist Action: Stop Racism" Benefit CD	Napalm Death, Less Than Jake, Alkaline Trio
2001	"Living Tomorrow Today: A Benefit for Ty Cambra"	Saves the Day, Alkaline Trio, New Found Glory
1997	"Misfits of Ska"	Less Than Jake, Reel Big Fish, Sublime
1997	"Misfits of Ska II"	Link 80, The Aquabats
1998	"Mailorder is Fun!"	Alkaline Trio, Less Than Jake, Mike Park
1999	"Mailorder is Still Fun!"	Alkaline Trio, Less Than Jake, Mike Park
2000	"Plea For Peace"	Link 80, Alkaline Trio, Mike Park
2001	"Plea For Peace / Take Action Tour I"	Alkaline Trio, Thrice, AFI, At the Drive-In
2001?	"Plea For Peace / Take Action Tour II"	Anti Flag, Avenged Sevenfold, Taking Back Sunday, Yellowcard
2001?	"Plea For Peace / Take Action Tour III"	Rise Against, Avenged Sevenfold, Yellowcard, Fall Out Boy
2002	"Mailorder for the Masses"	Alkaline Trio, Matt Skiba, Mike Park
2003	"Underground Screams"	(new artists)
2003	Version City Sessions"	Westbound Train
2007	"Plea For Peace Volume 2 "	Big D and the Kids Table, Cursive, Alkaline Trio. Throwdown, Rx Bandits
2007	"Ten Years of Blood, Sweat, and Tears"	Slapstick, The Queers, Screeching Weasel, The Broadways, The Bruce Lee Band, The Chinkees, Potshot, The Toasters, The Peacocks, The Rudiments
