= List of punk rock bands, 0–K =

This is a list of notable punk rock bands beginning with the numbers 0–9 and letters A through K. The bands listed have played some type of punk music at some point in their career, although they may have also played other styles. Bands who played in a style that influenced early punk rock—such as garage rock and protopunk—but never played punk rock themselves, are not on this list. Bands who created a new genre that was influenced by (but is not a subgenre of) punk rock—such as alternative rock, crossover thrash, grunge, metalcore, new wave, and post-punk—but never played punk rock, are not listed either.

== 0–9 ==
| Band name | Origin | Years active | Brief summary |
|---|---|---|---|
| 108 | New York, New York, US | 1991–96, 2005–present | A post-hardcore band with music inspired by the Krishna Consciousness. |
| 1208 | Hermosa Beach, California, US | 1994–2007 | A melodic punk band started by Alex Flynn, who is closely related to Greg Ginn of Black Flag. |
| 2 Minutos | Valentín Alsina, Argentina | 1987–present | A street punk band. |
| 22 Jacks | California, United States | 1995–2001, 2007–present | A punk supergroup with members of Wax (American band), The Breeders, Adolescents (band), and Royal Crown Revue. |
| 25 ta Life | Queens, New York, US | 1991–present | A New York hardcore band. |
| 28 Days | Frankston, Melbourne, Victoria, Australia | 1997–2007, 2009–present | A punk/rapcore band. |
| 3 Feet Smaller | Vienna, Austria | 2000–present | A punk rock band. |
| 30 Foot Fall | Houston, Texas, US | 1993–present | A band that has played different genres of punk, including melodic hardcore, skate punk and hardcore punk. |
| 4ft Fingers | Cheltenham, England, UK | 1998–present | A skate punk melodic band. |
| The 4-Skins | East End, London, England, UK | 1979–1984, 2007–present | A working class Oi! band. |
| +44 | Los Angeles, California, US | 2005–2009 | A pop punk/alternative rock band named after the phone code for the United Kingdom, formed by members of Blink 182, Mark Hoppus and Travis Barker. |
| 45 Grave | Los Angeles, California, US | 1979–1985, 1988–1990, 2005–present | A horror punk/deathrock band. |
| 48May | Hamilton, New Zealand | 2004–2008 | A pop punk band. |
| 5 Seconds of Summer | Sydney, New South Wales, Australia | 2011–present | A pop punk/pop rock band. |
| 59 Times the Pain | Fagersta, Sweden | 1992–2001, 2008 | A hardcore punk band with working-class roots. |
| 6 Voltios | Lima, Peru | 1998–present | A punk rock band. |
| 7 Seconds | Reno, Nevada, US | 1980–2018, 2022 | A straight edge melodic hardcore band who pioneered the youth crew genre. |
| 88 Fingers Louie | Chicago, Illinois, US | 1993–1996, 1998–1999, 2009–2010, 2013–present | A melodic hardcore band. |
| 98 Mute | Hermosa Beach, California, US | 1993–2002, 2016 | A street punk band. |
| 999 | London, England, UK | 1977–1982, 1983–1987, 1993–present | A classic punk band. |

== A ==
| Band name | Origin | Years active | Brief summary |
|---|---|---|---|
| A | Suffolk, England, UK | 1993–2005, 2008–present | An alternative rock band who have also played genres such as pop punk, hard rock and post-grunge. |
| Abhinanda | Umeå, Sweden | 1992–1999, 2004, 2009–2010, 2012, 2022–present | A hardcore punk band who had close ties to influential hardcore punk band Refused. |
| Abrasive Wheels | Leeds, West Yorkshire, England, UK | 1976–1984, 2003–present | A classic English punk band known for their seminal albums "When The Punks Go Marching In" and the singles "Vicious Circle/Voice of Youth" and "Army Song". |
| AC4 | Umeå, Sweden | 2008–2013 | A hardcore punk band. |
| Ace Troubleshooter | Plymouth, Minnesota, US | 1995–2005 | A pop punk band. |
| !Action Pact! | Stanwell, London, England, UK | 1981–1986 | An aggressive English punk band. |
| Adam and the Ants | London, England, UK | 1977–1982 | A band which originally played punk rock, moving toward post-punk from 1978 to 1979. A later incarnation achieved commercial success as part of the New Romantic movement. |
| The Adicts | Ipswich, Suffolk, England, UK | 1977–1993, 2002–present | A British classic punk band known for dressing similar to the "droogs" (ruffians) in the Stanley Kubrick film A Clockwork Orange. |
| The Adolescents | Fullerton, California, US | 1980–1981, 1986–1989, 2001–present | A hardcore punk supergroup with members from Agent Orange and Social Distortion. |
| The Adverts | London, England, UK | 1976–1979 | A punk rock band with one of the earliest female punk stars, Gaye Advert. |
| Adrenalin O.D. | Elmwood Park, New Jersey, US | 1981–1990, 1999, 2005, 2007 | A hardcore punk band. |
| Afektiven Naboj | Struga, North Macedonia | 1979–present | A punk rock band. |
| AFI | Ukiah, California, US | 1991–present | A band that began as a hardcore punk band before shifting to horror punk, then to alternative rock. |
| Afro Jetz | Umeå, Sweden | 1987–1989 | A punk rock band consisting of Dennis Lyxzén. |
| Against All Authority | Culter Bay, Florida, US | 1992–2007, 2021–present | A DIY ska punk band. |
| Against | Brisbane, Queensland, Australia | 2001–present | A hardcore punk band. |
| Against Me! | Naples, Florida, US | 1997–2020 | A punk rock band. |
| Agent 51 | Poway, California, US | 1995–2005, 2008, 2012, 2015 | A punk rock band. |
| Agent Orange | Placentia, California, US | 1979–present | A surf punk band. |
| Agnostic Front | New York, New York, US | 1982–1992, 1997–present | A key New York hardcore band; had a crossover thrash period. |
| Aiden | Seattle, Washington, US | 2003–2012, 2014–2016 | A post-hardcore/punk rock/horror punk band. |
| AJJ | Phoenix, Arizona, US | 2004–present | A DIY folk punk band. |
| Alexisonfire | St. Catharines, Ontario, Canada | 2001–2011, 2012, 2015–present | A Juno Award-winning post-hardcore band. |
| Alkaline Trio | Chicago, Illinois, US | 1996–present | A punk rock trio. |
| Alice Donut | New York, New York, US | 1986–1996, 2001–present | A psychedelic alternative punk rock band. |
| Alien Ant Farm | Riverside, California, US | 1996–present | An alternative metal/alternative rock/post-grunge/nu metal/pop-punk/punk rock band. |
| All | Fort Collins, Colorado, US | 1987–2003, 2008–present | A punk rock band formed by members of the Descendents. |
| The All-American Rejects | Stillwater, Oklahoma, US | 1999–present | An alternative rock, emo, and pop punk band. |
| Allister | Chicago, Illinois, US | 1994–2007, 2010–present | A melodic punk band. |
| The Alley Cats | Los Angeles, California, US | 1977–1982, 2015–present | A punk rock trio. |
| GG Allin | Lancaster, New Hampshire, US | 1976–1993 | A shock rock musician known for having debauched stage shows. |
| All Systems Go! | Toronto, Ontario, Canada | 1998–2006 | A punk rock supergroup. |
| Alternative TV | London, England, UK | 1976–1979, 1981, 1985–2004, 2014–present | A pioneer of reggae rhythms in punk. |
| Amebix | Devon, England, UK | 1978–87, 2008–2012 | A pioneer of the crust punk genre. |
| Amen | Los Angeles, California, US | 1994–2008, 2015–present | A band that plays a mix of nu metal and hardcore punk. |
| American Standards | Phoenix, Arizona, US | 2011–present | A hardcore noise-punk band. |
| American Steel | Oakland, California, US | 1995–present | A punk rock band. |
| American Hi-Fi | Boston, Massachusetts, US | 1998–present | A pop punk band. |
| Amyl and the Sniffers | Melbourne, Victoria, Australia | 2016–present | A pub rock band. |
| Anamanaguchi | New York City, New York, US | 2004–present | A chiptune-based pop and rock band. |
| The Analogs | Szczecin, Poland | 1995–present | An anti-fascist street punk band. |
| Angelic Upstarts | South Shields, Tyne and Wear, England, UK | 1977–present | A socialist working class Oi! punk and skinhead band. |
| Anhrefn | Bangor, Gwynedd, Wales, UK | 1982–1995, 2007 | A Welsh language punk rock band. The band also sang in English. |
| Ann Beretta | Richmond, Virginia, US | 1996–2004, 2012–2023 | A skate punk band. |
| Anonymous | Andorra la Vella, Andorra | 2004–2007 | A punk rock band. |
| Angry Samoans | Los Angeles, California, US | 1978–present | A classic punk band. |
| Anthrax | Gravesend, Kent, England, UK | 1980–1984, 2010–present | An English anarcho-punk band. Not to be confused with the American thrash metal band, Anthrax. |
| Anti-Cimex | Gothenburg, Sweden | 1981–1993 | A band that was one of the first bands to define Scandinavian D-beat. |
| Antidote | Amsterdam/Rotterdam/Utrecht, Netherlands | 1996–2012, 2017 | A hardcore punk band. |
| Anti-Establishment | London, England, UK | 1978–1983, 2013 | A second-wave UK punk/Oi! band. |
| Anti-Everything | Port of Spain, Trinidad And Tobago | 2000–present | A punk rock band that is the only punk rock band from Trinidad And Tobago and the only punk rock band to use a steelpan. |
| Anti-Flag | Pittsburgh, Pennsylvania, US | 1988–89, 1992–2023 | A political melodic punk rock band. |
| Anti-Heros | Atlanta, Georgia, US | 1984–1988, 1994–1999 | An Oi!/street punk band. |
| Antillectual | Nijmegen/Utrecht, Netherlands | 2000–present | A melodic hardcore band. |
| Anti-Nowhere League | Royal Tunbridge Wells, Kent, England, UK | 1980–1989, 1992–present | A classic English punk band. |
| Anti-Pasti | Derbyshire, England, UK | 1978–1984, 1995, 2012–present | A British punk band from the third wave of punk in England during the early 1980s. |
| Anti-Scrunti Faction | Boulder, Colorado, US | 1984–1985 | A queercore punk trio. |
| Antischism | Columbia, South Carolina, US | 1988–1991, 1993–1994 | A crust punk band. |
| Antisect | Daventry, Northamptonshire, England, UK | 1982–87, 2011–present | An anarcho-punk band. |
| Antiseen | Charlotte, North Carolina, US | 1983–present | A punk rock band. |
| Anti-System | Bradford, West Yorkshire, England, UK | 1982–1986, 2014–present | An anarcho-punk band. |
| The Apers | Rotterdam, Netherlands | 1996–present | A pop punk band. |
| The Apostles | Islington, London, England, UK | 1979–1990 | An experimental anarcho-punk band that, in general, eschewed the prevalent punk aesthetics. |
| Appendix | Pori, Finland | 1980–1985, 1995–present | A punk rock band. |
| The Aquabats | Huntington Beach, California, US | 1994–present | An American superhero-themed electropunk/ska punk band. Travis Barker's (Blink-182) former band from 1996 to 1998. |
| Armia | Poland | 1984–present | A christian punk band. |
| Armed and Hammered | Toronto, Ontario, Canada | 1989–2003, 2010, 2012–present | A hardcore punk band. |
| Arson Anthem | New Orleans, Louisiana, US | 2006–2013 | A hardcore punk band. |
| The Art Attacks | London, England, UK | 1977–1978 | A classic punk band. |
| Articles of Faith | Chicago, Illinois, US | 1981–1985, 1991, 2010 | A hardcore punk band. |
| The Artist Life | Toronto, Ontario, Canada | 2005–2012 | A pop punk band. |
| Die Ärzte | Berlin, Germany | 1982–88, 1993–present | A punk rock band with influences ranging from rock, punk, ska, jazz, swing, and hip hop. |
| Asexuals | Beaconsfield, Quebec, Canada | 1983–1996, 2010–2012, 2016–2017, 2019 | A hardcore punk band. |
| As Friends Rust | Davie, Florida, US | 1996–2002, 2008, 2011–present | A melodic hardcore band. |
| Ash | Downpatrick, County Down, Northern Ireland, UK | 1992–present | A pop punk band. |
| Assjack | Gridley, California, US | 1999–2009 | A hardcore punk band. |
| Assorted Jelly Beans | Riverside, California, US | 1996–1999, 2008 | A punk rock band consisting of Richard Falomir. |
| Asta Kask | Töreboda, Sweden | 1978–1989, 1992, 2003–present | A pioneer of trallpunk. |
| At the Drive-In | El Paso, Texas, US | 1994–2001, 2012, 2016–2018 | A post-hardcore band. |
| The Ataris | Anderson, Indiana, US | 1996–present | A pop punk band. |
| Athena | Istanbul, Turkey | 1987–present | A ska punk band. |
| Atheist Rap | Novi Sad, Vojvodina, Serbia | 1989–present | A punk rock band whose music is often categorized as "happy punk". |
| Atlas Losing Grip | Lund, Scania, Sweden | 2005–2016 | A Swedish punk rock band with metal influences. |
| Atom & His Package | Oreland, Pennsylvania, US | 1997–2003, 2008, 2017, 2020 | An synthpunk outfit consisting solely of Adam Goren. |
| Attaque 77 | Buenos Aires, Argentina | 1987–present | A punk rock band. |
| Aurora | Győr, Hungary | 1983–present | A hardcore punk band. |
| Aus-Rotten | Pittsburgh, Pennsylvania, US | 1992–2001, 2019 | A crust punk band. |
| Authority Zero | Mesa, Arizona, US | 1994–present | A reggae/skate punk band. |
| Automatics | England, UK | 1976–78, 2000–present | A classic punk band. |
| Autopilot Off | Orange County, New York, US | 1996–2005, 2011–present | A skate punk band. |
| Avail | Reston, Virginia, US | 1987–2007, 2019–present | A melodic hardcore band. |
| The Avengers | San Francisco Bay Area, California, US | 1977–79, 1999, 2004–present | A hardcore punk band. |
| Avenues | Milwaukee, Wisconsin, US | 2006–present | The band's song "Hold Me" was featured on episode 2 of the MTV reality series The Real World: St. Thomas in 2012. |
| Avoid One Thing | Boston, Massachusetts, US | 2002–2005, 2019–present | A punk rock band. |
| Avtomaticheskie udovletvoriteli | Leningrad, Russia | 1979–1998 | A classic punk band. |
| Awkward Thought | New York, New York, US | 1999–2003 | A hardcore punk band. |

== B ==
| Band name | Origin | Years active | Brief summary |
|---|---|---|---|
| Babes in Toyland | Minneapolis, Minnesota, US | 1987–2001, 2014–2017 | A punk rock band that played mostly alternative rock music. |
| Baby Strange | Glasgow, Scotland, UK | 2012–2023 | A punk rock band that played mostly indie rock music. |
| Backyard Babies | Nässjö, Sweden | 1987–present | A glam punk/hard rock band. |
| Bad Astronaut | Goleta, California, US | 2000–2006, 2010–present | A punk rock band that plays mostly indie rock/alternative rock music. |
| Bad Brains | Washington, D.C., US | 1976–1995, 1998–present | An all black hardcore punk/reggae band. One of the pioneers of hardcore punk. |
| Bad Religion | Woodland Hills, Los Angeles, California, US | 1980–present | A second tier early 80's Cali hardcore punk group turned influential melodic hardcore pioneers. Active over 40 years. |
| Bags | Los Angeles, California, US | 1977–1981 | One of the first generation of California punk rock bands. |
| Balzac | Osaka, Japan | 1992–present | A Japanese horror punk band. |
| Bambix | Nijmegen, Netherlands | 1988–present | A Dutch Punk/Riot grrl/queercore band. |
| Bane | Worcester, Massachusetts, US | 1995–2016, 2021, 2023 | A hardcore punk band. |
| Bankrupt | Budapest, Hungary | 1996–present | A melodic punk rock band. |
| The Banner | New Jersey, US | 1999–present | A hardcore punk band. |
| Banner Pilot | Minneapolis, Minnesota, US | 2005–present | A punk rock/melodic hardcore band. |
| Basement | Ipswich, Suffolk, England, UK | 2009–2012, 2014–2019, 2022, 2024–present | A melodic hardcore band, heavily influenced by the 1990s grunge movement. |
| Batfoot | Sydney, Australia | 2008–present | A pop punk band influenced by Screeching Weasel and The Queers. |
| Battalion of Saints | San Diego, California, US | 1980–1985, 1995–2019 | A hardcore punk band. |
| Battery | Washington, D.C., US | 1990–1998, 2012, 2017 | A hardcore punk band. |
| Bayside | Queens, New York, US | 2000–present | A punk rock band that plays mostly alternative rock music. |
| BBQ Chickens | Japan | 2000–present | A Japanese hardcore punk band formed by Ken Yokoyama of Hi-Standard. |
| Beastie Boys | Brooklyn, New York, US | 1981–2012 | Began as a hardcore punk band, transitioned into hip hop and rap rock. |
| Beat Crusaders | Japan | 1997–2010 | A pop punk band that performs with masks of dot-matrix drawings of themselves. |
| Beatsteaks | Berlin, Germany | 1995–present | A punk rock band that plays mostly alternative rock music. |
| Beer7 | Be'er Sheva, Israel | 2002–present | A ska punk band. |
| Behind Enemy Lines | Pittsburgh, Pennsylvania, US | 2000–present | An anarchist crust punk/heavy metal band with two members of Aus-Rotten. |
| Being As An Ocean | Alpine, California | 2011–present | A melodic hardcore band. |
| Belvedere | Calgary, Alberta, Canada | 1995–2005, 2011–present | A skate punk band. |
| Bérurier Noir | Paris, France | 1983–1989, 2003–2006 | An anarcho-punk band. |
| Best Revenge | Los Angeles, California, US | 1998–2002, 2006 | A queercore punk band. |
| Better Luck Next Time | Los Angeles, California, US | 2003–2014 | In September 2006, Better Luck Next Time was chosen as 1 of 10 local bands out of 2,500 in Southern California given the chance to play KROQ-FM's Inland Invasion, in which they placed 2nd. |
| Bhopal Stiffs | Chicago, Illinois, US | 1985–1989, 2001, 2010 | A hardcore punk band. |
| Bickley | Houston, Texas, US | 1995–2001, 2013, 2015, 2018, 2023–present | A punk rock band. |
| Big Black | Evanston, Illinois, US | 1981–1987, 2006 | Instrumental in the development of noise rock. Notable for using a drum machine instead of a kit. |
| Big Boys | Austin, Texas, US | 1979–1984 | One of the pioneers of the hardcore punk genre. |
| Big D and the Kids Table | Allston, Boston, Massachusetts, US | 1995–present | A third-wave ska band. |
| Big Drill Car | Costa Mesa, California, US | 1987–1995, 2008–2009, 2016–present | One of the pioneers of the melodic hardcore genre. |
| Big in Japan | Liverpool, Merseyside, England, UK | 1977–1979 | Members went on to be in bands such as The KLF, Lightning Seeds, Siouxsie and the Banshees Pink Military, and Frankie goes to Hollywood. |
| Bigwig | Nutley, New Jersey, US | 1995–present | A skate punk band. |
| Bikini Kill | Olympia, Washington, US | 1990–1997, 2017, 2019–present | A punk rock band part of the Riot Grrrl movement. |
| The Bill | Pionki, Poland | 1988–present | A punk rock band. |
| Billy Idol | Stanmore, Middlesex, England, UK | 1976–present | A punk rock artist. |
| Billy Liar | Edinburgh, Scotland, UK | 2005–present | An acoustic punk/folk band from Edinburgh, fronted by the solo singer of the same name. |
| Billy Talent | Mississauga, Ontario, Canada | 1993–present | The punk rock band was formerly known as Pezz. They changed their name when they were threatened with a lawsuit from an American band of the same name. |
| Biohazard | Brooklyn, New York, US | 1988–2006, 2008–present | One of the earliest bands to fuse hardcore punk with elements of hip-hop. |
| Blackbird Raum | Santa Cruz, California, US | 2004–present | A folk punk band. |
| Blackfire | Flagstaff, Arizona, US | 1989–2011 | A Navajo traditionally influenced, punk rock band of three siblings, with strong political messages. |
| Black Flag | Hermosa Beach, California, US | 1976–1986, 2003, 2013–2014, 2019–present | An influential hardcore punk band active since the late 1970s. Also one of the pioneers of post-hardcore. |
| The Black Halos | Vancouver, British Columbia, Canada | 1993–present | A glam rock band that plays mostly punk rock music. |
| Black Lips | Dunwoody, Georgia, US | 1999–present | A garage rock and a self-proclaimed "flower punk" band from Georgia. |
| Black Lungs | St. Catharines, Ontario, Canada | 2005–present | A folk punk/hardcore punk band. |
| The Black Pacific | Huntington Beach, California, US | 2010–2012 | A melodic punk rock band. |
| Black Randy and the Metrosquad | Los Angeles, California, US | 1977–1982 | A proto-punk band. |
| Black Square | Honolulu, Hawaii, US | 2002–present | A ska punk band. |
| Blaggers ITA | London, England, UK | 1988–1996 | A street punk band noted for their strong anti-fascist and left-wing lyrics & activism. |
| Blanks 77 | Hillside, New Jersey, US | 1990–2001, 2004–present | A punk rock band. |
| Bl'ast | Santa Cruz, California, US | 1983–1991, 2001, 2013–present | A hardcore punk band. |
| Blatz | Berkeley, California, US | 1989–1992 | A punk rock band. |
| The Bleach Boys | Hitchin, Hertfordshire, England, UK | 1976–present | A punk rock band. |
| Blink-182 | Poway, California, US | 1992–2005, 2009–present | A pop punk, skate punk, and alternative rock band that has achieved tremendous popular success, selling over 50 million albums worldwide. |
| Blitz | New Mills, Derbyshire, England, UK | 1980–2007 | An Oi!/street punk band. |
| Blitzkid | Bluefield, West Virginia, USA | 1997–2012, 2019–present | A horror punk band. |
| Blitzkrieg | Southport, Merseyside, England, UK | 1979–1984, 1991–1995, 2007–present | A hardcore punk band. |
| The Blockheads | London, UK | 1977–present | Backing band for Ian Dury, whose musical influences spanned disco, funk, music hall, and 1950s rock and roll. |
| Blondie | New York, New York, US | 1974–1982, 1997–present | A pioneer of American punk rock and new wave music. |
| The Blood | London, England, UK | 1982–present | The first punk rock band to be featured in the rock and roll magazine Kerrang!. |
| Blood for Blood | Boston, Massachusetts, US | 1994–2004, 2010 | A hardcore punk/beatdown hardcore band. |
| The Blue Hearts | Shibuya, Tokyo, Japan | 1985–1995 | An influential punk rock band from Japan. |
| Blue Meanies | Carbondale, Illinois, US | 1989–2001, 2014 | A ska punk band. |
| Blue Oil | Montreal, Quebec, Canada | 1978-1991 | First all-female punk band from Quebec. |
| Blyth Power | Somerset, England, UK | 1983–present | A folk punk band. |
| Bobot Adrenaline | Los Angeles, California, US | 2001–present | A punk rock band. |
| Bodyjar | Melbourne, Victoria, Australia | 1990–2009, 2012–present | A skate punk band. |
| Bold | Katonah, New York, US | 1986–1993, 2005–present | A hardcore punk band. |
| Bomb Factory | Tokyo, Japan | 1991–present | A hardcore punk/melodic hardcore band. |
| The Bombpops | San Diego, California, US | 2007–present | The band name was chosen after the drummer ordered a Lickety Lick Bombpop from an ice cream van that stopped near his house. |
| Bomb the Music Industry! | Baldwin, New York, US | 2004–2014 | DIY ska punk/indie rock/folk punk band that offers its music by donation on Quote Unquote Records. |
| The Boomtown Rats | Dún Laoghaire, Republic of Ireland | 1975–1986, 2013–present | An art punk/new wave/power pop band. |
| Bowling for Soup | Wichita Falls, Texas, US | 1994–present | A pop punk band. |
| Born Against | New York, New York, US | 1989–1993 | A hardcore punk band. |
| The Bouncing Souls | New Brunswick, New Jersey, US | 1989–present | A skate punk band. |
| Box Car Racer | Los Angeles, California, US | 2001–2003, 2018–2021 | A side project of Blink-182, with members Tom DeLonge and Travis Barker. |
| The Boys | London, England, UK | 1976–1982, 1999–present | A punk rock band. |
| Bracket | Forestville, California, US | 1992–present | A power pop/alternative rock/melodic hardcore/indie rock/folk rock band. |
| Brain Failure | Beijing, China | 1998–2013 | A classic punk rock band. |
| Brand New | Levittown, New York, US | 2000–2017 | An alternative rock/pop punk band. |
| Brand New War | Los Angeles, California, US | 2002–present | A pop punk/street punk band formerly known as The God Awfuls. |
| Bratmobile | Olympia, Washington, US | 1991–1994, 1998–2003, 2019, 2023–present | A Riot grrrl/indie rock band. |
| Breakdown | Yonkers, New York, US | 1986–present | A hardcore punk/beatdown hardcore band. |
| Break Even | Perth, Western Australia, Australia | 2005–2012, 2014–2016 | A hardcore punk/melodic hardcore band. |
| The Briefs | Seattle, Washington, US | 2000–present | A pop punk band. |
| The Briggs | Los Angeles, California, US | 2001–present | A Celtic punk/street punk band. |
| The Broadways | Chicago, Illinois, US | 1996–1998 | A punk rock band with future The Lawrence Arms member Brendan Kelly. |
| Broadway Calls | Rainier, Oregon, US | 2005–present | A pop punk band. |
| Broken Bones | Stoke-on-Trent, England, UK | 1983–1987, 1989–1991, 1996–2010, 2012–2014 | A hardcore punk/street punk/crossover thrash/crust punk band. |
| The Bronx | Los Angeles, California, US | 2002–present | A hardcore punk/garage rock/mariachi band. |
| Brother's Keeper | Erie, Pennsylvania, US | 1994–2003 | A hardcore punk/metalcore band. |
| The Bruce Lee Band | California, US | 1995–2005, 2013–present | A ska punk band with members of Less Than Jake and Rx Bandits up until 2005. |
| The Bruisers | Portsmouth, New Hampshire, US | 1988–1998, 2005 | An Oi! band with future Dropkick Murphys singer Al Barr. |
| Brutal Juice | Denton, Texas, US | 1991–1997, 2012–present | A neo-psychedelia punk band. |
| Brutto | Minsk, Belarus | 2014–present | A street punk/ska punk band. |
| Brygada Kryzys | Warsaw, Poland | 1981–1982, 1991–1994, 2003, 2005–present | A post-punk band. |
| Buck-O-Nine | San Diego, California, US | 1991–present | A ska punk/reggae rock band. |
| Bullets and Octane | St. Louis, Missouri, US | 1998–present | A punk rock band that plays mostly hard rock and southern rock music. |
| Bullet Treatment | Los Angeles, California, US | 1998–present | A hardcore punk band. |
| Bunkface | Klang, Selangor, Malaysia | 2005–present | A pop punk/alternative rock/pop rock band. |
| Burn | New York, New York, US | 1989–present | A hardcore punk band. |
| Burning Heads | Orléans, France | 1987–present | A punk rock/reggae band. |
| Bus Station Loonies | Plymouth, Devon, England, UK | 1995–present | A comedic anarcho-punk band, including ex-members of Oi Polloi and Disorder. |
| The Business | Lewisham, South London, England, UK | 1979–1988, 1992–2016 | An Oi!/street punk band. |
| Butthole Surfers | San Antonio, Texas, US | 1981–2016 | A punk rock band that played mostly noise rock/experimental rock music. |
| Buzzcocks | Bolton, Greater Manchester, England, UK | 1976–1981, 1989–present | A classic punk rock band that influenced later pop punk bands and were also one of the first punk rock bands to establish an independent record label. |

== C ==
| Band name | Origin | Years active | Brief summary |
|---|---|---|---|
| Cancer Bats | Toronto, Ontario, Canada | 2004–present | A hardcore punk/sludge metal band. |
| Capdown | Milton Keynes, Buckinghamshire, England, UK | 1997–2007, 2008, 2010–present | A ska punk/hardcore punk band. |
| Carburetor Dung | Kuala Lumpur, Malaysia | 1991–present | An anarcho-punk/hardcore punk band. |
| Cardiac Kidz | San Diego, California, US | 1978–1981 | A street punk/new wave/hard rock band. Multiple Killed By Death appearances known also as first punk band to appear on San Diego TV. |
| Care Bears on Fire | Brooklyn, New York, US | 2005–2012 | An all female Riot grrrl/pop punk band. |
| Career Soldiers | San Diego, California, US | 2002–2009 | A hardcore punk/street punk band. |
| Career Suicide | Toronto, Ontario, Canada | 2001–present | A hardcore punk band. |
| Carpathian | Melbourne, Australia | 2003–2011 | A hardcore punk/metalcore band. |
| The Carpettes | Houghton-le-Spring, Tyne and Wear, England, UK | 1977–1981, 1996–present | A punk rock band that plays mostly power pop music. |
| The Carrier | Boston, Massachusetts, US | 2006–2012 | A melodic hardcore band. |
| Cartel | Conyers, Georgia, US | 2003–present | A pop punk/power pop band. |
| The Casualties | Jersey City, New Jersey, US | 1990–present | A street punk/hardcore punk band. |
| Catbite | Philadelphia, Pennsylvania, US | 2018-present | A ska punk band. |
| Catch 22 | East Brunswick, New Jersey, US | 1996–present | A third wave ska band notable for launching the career of Tomas Kalnoky. |
| Catholic Discipline | Los Angeles, California, US | 1979–1980 | A punk rock/no wave band notable for appearing in The Decline of Western Civilization. |
| Caustic Christ | Pittsburgh, Pennsylvania, US | 2000–2009 | A hardcore punk/crust punk band. |
| CCCP Fedeli alla linea | Reggio Emilia, Italy | 1982–1990, 2023–present | A genre-bending punk rock/electropop/new wave/post punk/art rock band. |
| Cerebral Ballzy | New York, New York, US | 2008–2015 | A hardcore punk/skate punk band. |
| Ceremony | Rohnert Park, California, US | 2005–present | Began as a hardcore punk band and shifted to a post-punk style. |
| Chain of Strength | California, US | 1988–1991, 2012–2013, 2015–present | An influential Southern California straight edge hardcore punk band. |
| Champion | Seattle, Washington, US | 1999–2006 | A youth crew band that played hardcore punk/melodic hardcore music. |
| A Change of Pace | Peoria, Arizona, US | 2001–2011, 2012–2016, 2019–present | A pop punk/alternative rock/post-hardcore band. |
| Channel 3 | Cerritos, California, US | 1980–present | A hardcore punk/melodic hardcore band. |
| Chaos UK | Portishead, Somerset, England, UK | 1979–present | An anarcho-punk/hardcore punk/street punk band. |
| Chaotic Dischord | Bristol, England, UK | 1981–1988, 2019–present | A classic punk rock band originally formed to parody some of their contemporaries. |
| Charged GBH | Birmingham, West Midlands, England, UK | 1978–present | Pioneers of English hardcore punk. |
| Charles Bronson | Chicago, Illinois, US | 1994–1997 | A powerviolence/thrashcore/hardcore punk band. |
| Charta 77 | Köping, Sweden | 1983–present | A prolific punk rock/pop rock band. |
| Cheap Sex | San Diego, California, US | 2002–2007, 2009, 2013–present | A street punk band. |
| Chelsea | London, England, UK | 1976–present | A classic punk rock band. |
| Chemical People | Los Angeles, California, US | 1986–1997 | A punk rock band. |
| Cherry Poppin' Daddies | Eugene, Oregon, US | 1989–2000, 2002–present | A funk/ska punk band that later integrated into the swing revival of the late 1990s. |
| Children 18:3 | Morris, Minnesota, US | 1999–present | A Christian punk band. |
| The Chinkees | San Francisco, California, US | 1997–2003, 2010, 2011, 2013, 2020 | A ska punk band. |
| Chixdiggit | Calgary, Alberta, Canada | 1991–present | A pop punk band. |
| Chokehold | Hamilton, Ontario, Canada | 1990–1996, 2015–present | A vegan straight edge hardcore punk/metalcore band. |
| Choking Victim | New York, New York, US | 1992–1999, 2000, 2005–2006, 2016–present | A crust punk/ska punk band describing themselves as "crack rocksteady." |
| Christ on Parade | San Francisco, California, US | 1985–1989 | An East Bay/Oakland political hardcore punk/crust punk band. |
| Chron Gen | Letchworth, Hertfordshire, England, UK | 1978–1985, 2013–present | An Oi! band. |
| Chronics | Bologne, Emilia-Romagna, Italy | 1996–present | A pop punk/power pop/garage rock band. |
| Chumbawamba | Leeds, West Yorkshire, England, UK | 1982–2012 | A one-hit wonder anarcho-punk/alternative rock/pop/folk/alternative dance band. |
| Chunk! No, Captain Chunk! | Paris, France | 2007–2016, 2020–present | The band name is taken from the scene in 1985 adventure-comedy movie The Goonies, in which Chunk and Sloth arrive on the scene to help their friends. |
| Circle Jerks | Hermosa Beach, California, US | 1979–1990, 1994–1995, 1998, 2001–2011, 2019–present | A hardcore punk band formed by former Black Flag singer Keith Morris (and future/current Bad Religion guitarist Greg Hetson). |
| Citizen Fish | Bath, Somerset, England, UK | 1990–present | A ska punk/anarcho-punk band with a member from the Subhumans. |
| CIV | New York, New York, US | 1994–2000, 2008, 2011, 2012, 2024 | A hardcore punk band featuring members of Gorilla Biscuits. |
| Civet | Long Beach, California, US | 2000–2011 | A self-proclaimed "femme fatale punk rock" band. |
| The Clash | Notting Hill, London, England, UK | 1976–1986 | A highly influential and widely acclaimed punk rock/new wave/post-punk/experimental rock band with reggae influences. As they put it, "the only band that matters." |
| Classics of Love | Emeryville, California, US | 2008–2012, 2020–present | A hardcore punk/ska punk band fronted by Operation Ivy's Jesse Michaels. |
| Clit 45 | Long Beach, California, US | 1996–2006, 2011, 2015, 2016, 2019 | A street punk/hardcore punk band. |
| Clockcleaner | Philadelphia, Pennsylvania, US | 2003–2009 | A punk rock band that played mostly noise rock and gothic rock. |
| Closet Monster | Ajax, Ontario, Canada | 1997–2005, 2009 | A pop punk band. |
| Cobra | Osaka, Japan | 1982–1991, 1999–2005, 2007–present | One of the first Japanese Oi! bands. |
| Cobra Skulls | Reno, Nevada, US | 2005–2013, 2018–present | A punk rock band. |
| Cock Sparrer | East End of London, London, England, UK | 1972–1978, 1982–1984, 1992–present | An influential working class Oi! band. |
| Cockney Rejects | East End of London, London, England, UK | 1978–1985, 1987–1991, 1999–present | A hugely influential Oi! band whose single "Oi, Oi, Oi" was the inspiration for the name of the genre itself. |
| Cocobat | Japan | 1991–present | A hardcore punk/groove metal/alternative metal/nu metal band. |
| The Code | Pittsburgh, Pennsylvania, US | 2000–2006, 2007, 2018, 2019 | A ska punk band. |
| Code Orange | Pittsburgh, Pennsylvania, US | 2008–present | A band that mixes hardcore punk with sludge metal. |
| Coldrain | Nagoya, Aichi, Japan | 2007–present | A Japanese post-hardcore/alternative rock band whose early sound was in style of punk rock. |
| Cólera | São Paulo, Brazil | 1979–present | An influential hardcore punk band. |
| Color | Osaka, Japan | 1985–1997, 2003. 2008 | A punk rock band that is credited as one of the bands to start the Japanese visual kei movement. |
| Colossal | Chicago, Illinois, US | 2001–2007, 2016 | A punk rock/indie rock/math rock/emo band. |
| Combat 84 | Chelsea, London, England, UK | 1981–1984, 2000 | A punk rock/Oi! band. |
| Comeback Kid | Winnipeg, Manitoba, Canada | 2001–present | A hardcore punk/melodic hardcore band. |
| Condemned 84 | Ipswich, Suffolk, England, UK | 1980–present | A punk rock/Oi! band. |
| Conflict | Eltham, London, England, UK | 1981–present | An anarcho-punk/hardcore punk/street punk band who helped to push issues such as animal rights and nuclear disarmament in the limelight. |
| Consorzio Suonatori Indipendenti | Italy | 1992–2000 | A punk rock band composed of former members of CCCP Fedeli alla linea. |
| Consumed | Nottingham, England, UK | 1992–2003, 2015–present | A skate punk/melodic hardcore band. |
| Converge | Salem, Massachusetts, US | 1990–present | A band blending metalcore and hardcore punk. |
| The Copyrights | Carbondale, Illinois, US | 2002–present | The band is known for what Alternative Press calls "both the sloppy, slacker pop-punk of, say, early Green Day with the slightly more polished sheen of Teenage Bottlerocket or recent Bouncing Souls." |
| Corrosion of Conformity | Raleigh, North Carolina, US | 1982–1987, 1989–2006, 2010–present | One of the first bands to fuse heavy metal with hardcore punk, but later only played southern rock. |
| Corrupted Ideals | Long Beach, California, US | 1988–1995, 2013–present | One of the first bands to bring back the original Oi! sound. They are noted for influencing bands like Swingin' Utters and Dropkick Murphys. They are known for their later anarcho-punk sound, but earlier releases were hardcore punk. |
| The Cortinas | Bristol, England, UK | 1976–1978 | First wave English punk rock band. |
| The Cost | San Francisco Bay Area, California, US | 1999–2003 | A punk rock band. |
| Count The Stars | Albany, New York, US | 1995–2003 | Was a four-piece pop punk band from Albany, New York that formed in 1995. After recording two albums, one with Chicago's Victory Records, the band split up in late 2003. |
| Craig's Brother | Santa Cruz, California, US | 1995–2001, 2003–present | An innovative pop punk/melodic hardcore band. Former members include Ryan Key of Yellowcard and Dan McLintock of Inspection 12. |
| The Cramps | Sacramento, California, US | 1976–2009 | An influential psychobilly/gothabilly/surf band. |
| Crass | Epping, Essex, England, UK | 1977–1984 | An anarcho-punk/art punk/avant-punk band. |
| Creaming Jesus | London, England, UK | 1987–1994 | A punk rock band that played mostly gothic rock/heavy metal/alternative rock music. |
| Creeper (band) | Southampton, England, UK | 2014–present | A horror punk/gothic rock/glam rock band. |
| The Creepshow | Burlington, Ontario, Canada | 2005–present | A psychobilly band. |
| Crime | San Francisco, California, US | 1976–1982, 2006–2017 | A punk rock band notable for releasing the first single released by a U.S. punk act from the West Coast, "Hot Wire My Heart", which was later covered by Sonic Youth. |
| Crime in Stereo | Levittown, New York, US | 2001–2011, 2012–present | A hardcore punk/melodic hardcore band. |
| The Criminals | Berkeley, California, US | 1994–2000, 2012 | A punk rock band. |
| Crimpshrine | Berkeley, California, US | 1982–1989 | A highly influential DIY punk rock band with future Operation Ivy singer Jesse Michaels. |
| Cringer | Manoa, Hawaii, US | 1985–1991 | A pop punk band. |
| Crisis | Guildford, Surrey, England, UK | 1977–1980, 2017–present | An anarcho-punk/punk rock band. |
| Cro-Mags | New York, New York, US | 1981–2002, 2008–present | One of the founders of the New York City hardcore punk scene. |
| The Crouches | Coventry, England, UK | 1981–1984 | A DIY anti-fascist punk rock band. |
| Crown of Thornz | New York, New York, US | 1994–1998, 2012–present | A hardcore punk band. |
| The Crucified | Fresno, California, US | 1984–1993, 1995, 2009–present | A Christian hardcore/hardcore punk/crossover thrash band. |
| Crucifix | Berkeley, California, US | 1980–1984 | A D-beat/hardcore punk/anarcho-punk band. |
| The Crucifucks | Lansing, Michigan, US | 1981–1989, 1996–1998 | A punk rock band. |
| Los Crudos | Lower West Side, Chicago, Illinois, US | 1991–1998, 2006, 2008–2009, 2012–present | A hardcore punk band. |
| Cruel Hand | Portland, Maine, US | 2006–present | A hardcore punk band. |
| Crumbsuckers | Baldwin, New York, US | 1982–1990, 2015 | Pioneers of the thrash metal genre. |
| Crying Nut | Seoul, South Korea | 1993–present | An influential punk rock/post-punk/new wave/indie rock/hardcore punk band. |
| The Cryptkeeper Five | Trenton, New Jersey, USA | 1997–present | A rock and roll/punk rock/horror punk band. |
| Cunter | Brampton, Ontario, Canada | 2009–present | A hardcore punk band. |
| Cursed | Canada | 2001–2008 | A crust punk/sludge metal band. |
| Cypher in the Snow | San Francisco, California, US | 1996–1998 | An all female punk rock queercore band. |

== D ==
| Band name | Origin | Years active | Brief summary |
|---|---|---|---|
| Daggermouth | Vancouver, British Columbia, Canada | 2004–2008, 2018 | A pop punk band. |
| Dag Nasty | Washington, D.C., US | 1985–1986, 1987–1988, 1992, 2002, 2012, 2015–present | A hardcore punk/melodic hardcore/post-hardcore band. |
| Daisy Chainsaw | London, England, UK | 1989–1995 | An alternative rock/indie rock/garage punk/noise rock band. |
| Damage | New York, New York, US | 1983–1988 | A hardcore punk band. |
| Damnation A.D. | Washington, D.C., US | 1992–1998, 2007–present | An influential hardcore punk/metalcore band. |
| The Damned | London, England, UK | 1976–present | Believed to be the first UK punk rock band to release an album. Pioneers of the gothic rock genre. |
| Dance Hall Crashers | Berkeley, California, US | 1989–1990, 1992–2004 | A ska punk/pop punk band. |
| The Dangerous Summer | Ellicott City, Maryland, US | 2006–2014, 2017–present | The band's song "The Permanent Rain" was used in a trailer for the 2009 movie Love Happens. |
| Dan Vapid & The Cheats | Chicago, Illinois, US | 2011–present | A pop punk band from Chicago that features former members of Screeching Weasel, The Riverdales, The Methadones, Noise By Numbers, The Vindictives, Sludgeworth, and The Bomb. |
| Darby Crash Band | Los Angeles, California, US | 1980 | A music project started by Darby Crash and Pat Smear, founding members of punk rock band the Germs, formed after the Germs split in 1980. |
| Darkbuster | Boston, Massachusetts, US | 1996–2001, 2003–2008, 2009, 2015 | A hardcore punk/Oi! band. |
| Darkthrone | Kolbotn, Akershus, Norway | 1986–present | Originally a black metal band, a major stylistic shift to crust punk occurred in 2006. |
| Days N' Daze | Houston, Texas, US | 2008–Present | A folk punk band. |
| A Day To Remember | Ocala, Florida, US | 2003–present | A fusion of pop punk and metalcore known as easycore. |
| Dayglo Abortions | Victoria, British Columbia, Canada | 1979–present | A hardcore punk/crossover thrash/heavy metal band. |
| d.b.s. | North Vancouver, British Columbia, Canada | 1992–2001 | A melodic punk rock band, whose later work incorporated post-hardcore. |
| De Lyckliga Kompisarna | Stockholm, Sweden | 1989–1997, 2008 | A trallpunk band. |
| The Dead Boys | Cleveland, Ohio, US | 1975–1980, 1987, 2004–2005, 2017–present | A classic punk rock band known for their outlandish gigs at New York's CBGB's and Max's Kansas City. |
| Dead Kennedys | San Francisco, California, US | 1978–1986, 2001–present | A highly influential political hardcore punk band. |
| Dead Milkmen | Philadelphia, Pennsylvania, US | 1983–1995, 2004, 2008–present | A punk rock/comedic rock band who often used satirical lyrics. |
| Dead Swans | Brighton, England, UK | 2006–2013, 2016–present | A hardcore punk band. |
| Dead to Me | San Francisco, California, US | 2003–2013, 2015–present | A punk rock band. |
| Death | Detroit, Michigan, US | 1971–1977, 2009–present | An early funk band that plays protopunk/garage rock. |
| Death Before Dishonor | Boston, Massachusetts, US | 2000–present | A beatdown hardcore band. |
| Death by Stereo | Orange County, California, US | 1998–present | A hardcore punk/melodic hardcore/heavy metal band. |
| Decibel | Milan, Italy | 1977–1998, 2016–present | A punk rock/new wave/alternative rock band. |
| The Decline | Perth, Western Australia, Australia | 2005–present | A skate punk/melodic hardcore/pop punk band. |
| Deep Wound | Westfield, Massachusetts, US | 1982–1984, 2004, 2013 | A hardcore punk/thrashcore band. |
| Defeater | Boston, Massachusetts, US | 2008–present | A hardcore punk/melodic hardcore/post-hardcore/emo. |
| The Defects | Belfast, Northern Ireland, UK | 1978–84, 2010–present | A classic punk rock band. |
| Defiance | Portland, Oregon, US | 1993–present | A street punk/hardcore punk/anarcho-punk band. |
| The Del Fuegos | Boston, Massachusetts, US | 1980–1990, 2011–2012, 2023 | A garage rock/alternative rock/garage punk/blues rock/new wave band. |
| The Demics | London, Ontario, Canada | 1977–1980 | A classic punk rock band. |
| Descendents | Manhattan Beach, California, US | 1977–1983, 1985–1987, 1995–1997, 2002–2004, 2010–present | A pioneer of pop punk, whose career has largely been dictated by the coming and going of lead singer Milo Aukerman. |
| Destine | Tilburg, Netherlands | 2006–2015 | A pop punk/power pop/alternative rock/emo band. |
| Destroy! | Minneapolis, Minnesota, US | 1988–1994 | A crust punk/grindcore band. |
| Destroy Boys | Sacramento, California, US | 2015–present | A punk rock/garage punk/hardcore punk band of three members. |
| The Destructors | Peterborough, England, UK | 1977–1979, 1980–1984, 2006–present | A punk rock/garage rock band who featured Gizz Butt of The Prodigy. |
| Deviated Instinct | Norwich, England, UK | 1984–1991, 2007–present | A death metal band whose early sound was in style of crust punk. |
| Devo | Akron, Ohio, US | 1972–1991, 1996–present | A new wave/synth-pop/art punk/post-punk/electronic rock/geek rock band. |
| The Devotchkas | Long Island, New York, US | 1996–2002, 2022–present | An all female street punk band. |
| Dezerter | Warsaw, Poland | 1981–present | One of the most popular Polish hardcore punk bands. |
| D.I. | Orange County, California, US | 1981–present | A hardcore punk band featuring members of The Adolescents and Social Distortion. |
| The Dicks | Austin, Texas, US | 1980–1986, 2004–2016 | A hardcore punk band that incorporates blues rock. |
| The Dickies | San Fernando Valley, Los Angeles, California, US | 1977–present | A classic punk rock/pop punk/comedy rock bands. |
| The Dictators | New York, New York, US | 1972–1975, 1976–1980, 1995–2009, 2020–present | A proto-punk/hard rock/punk rock band. |
| Die Mannequin | Toronto, Ontario, Canada | 2005–present | A punk rock band that plays mostly alternative rock music. |
| DieMonsterDie | Salt Lake City, Utah, US | 1995–2020 | A horror punk band. |
| Diesel Boy | Santa Rosa, California, US | 1993–2002, 2022–present | Diesel Boy appears, as a band, while performing their own material from the Cock Rock album, on an episode of Freaks and Geeks called "Moshing and Noshing" that aired in 2000. |
| Die Toten Hosen | Düsseldorf, Germany | 1982–present | A punk rock band that has become one of the biggest rock bands in German history. Also popular in other German speaking countries and Argentina. |
| The Diffs | Los Angeles, California, US | 2003–present | A classic punk rock band that released one album in 2005. |
| Dillinger Four | Minneapolis, Minnesota, US | 1994–present | A punk rock/melodic hardcore/hardcore punk band. |
| The Dils | Carlsbad, California, US | 1976–1980 | A classic punk rock band. |
| The Diodes | Toronto, Ontario, Canada | 1977–1982, 1998, 2007, 2010, 2011, 2015 | A punk rock/power pop/new wave band. |
| Direct Hit! | Milwaukee, Wisconsin, US | 2007–present | In September 2014, Nick Woods was a guest on the television show Last Call with Carson Daly, where he was interviewed about his band. |
| Dirty Rotten Imbeciles | Houston, Texas, US | 1982–present | A crossover thrash/hardcore punk band. |
| Discharge | Stoke-on-Trent, Staffordshire, England, UK | 1977–1987, 1991–1999, 2001–present | A hardcore punk/heavy metal/crust punk/street punk band that single-handedly created the genre "D-Beat." |
| Disclose | Kōchi City, Japan | 1990–2007 | A crust punk/hardcore punk band. |
| Discount | Vero Beach, Florida, US | 1995–2000 | A punk rock band. |
| Disfear | Nyköping, Sweden | 1989–present | A D-beat/crust punk/death metal band. |
| Disorder | Bristol, England, UK | 1980–present | A hardcore punk/crust punk band. |
| Disrupt | Lynn, Massachusetts, US | 1987–1994 | A grindcore/crust punk band. |
| Distemper | Moscow, Russia | 1989–present | A ska punk band whose early sound was in style of hardcore punk. |
| The Distillers | Los Angeles, California, US | 1998–2006, 2018–present | A punk rock/hardcore punk/street punk/skate punk band led by Brody Dalle. |
| División Minúscula | Matamoros, Tamaulipas, Mexico | 1996–present | An alternative rock/pop punk/indie rock/stoner rock band. |
| DMZ | Boston, Massachusetts, US | 1975–1978, 1993, 2001–2003 | A garage rock/punk rock/garage punk band. |
| D.O.A. | Vancouver, British Columbia, Canada | 1978–1990, 1992–2013, 2014–present | A political hardcore punk band. |
| Dog Eat Dog | Bergen County, New Jersey, US | 1990–present | A Christian punk/hardcore punk/rap metal/funk metal band. |
| Dog Faced Hermans | Edinburgh, Scotland, UK | 1986–1995 | An anarcho-punk/noise rock band. |
| Doggy Style | Fullerton, California, US | 1983–1988, 2009–present | Daddy X of the Kottonmouth Kings was the original vocalist of this punk rock band. |
| Dogsflesh | Teesside, England, UK | 1982–1985, 2005–present | A classic street punk band. |
| Dogwood | Escondido, California, US | 1993–present | A pop punk/skate punk/Christian punk/hardcore punk band. |
| The Dollyrots | Sarasota, Florida, US | 2000–present | This pop punk band's songs has been used in movies, TV shows, and commercials. |
| Donots | Ibbenbüren, Germany | 1993–present | A pop punk band that has achieved great success. |
| Doom | Birmingham, West Midlands, England, UK | 1987–1990, 1992–2005, 2010–present | A crust punk/hardcore punk band. |
| The Dopamines | Cincinnati, Ohio, US | 2006–present | A punk rock band with a musical style is similar to bands like Banner Pilot and Dear Landlord. |
| Down by Law | Los Angeles, California, US | 1989–2003, 2008–present | A punk rock band. |
| downset. | Los Angeles, California, US | 1989–2009, 2013–present | A rap metal/hardcore punk/funk metal band. |
| Down to Nothing | Richmond, Virginia, US | 2000–2022 | A hardcore punk band. |
| Drabness | Motala, Sweden | 1994–1998 | A nu metal band. |
| The Draft | Gainesville, Florida, US | 2006–2007, 2013 | A punk rock band. |
| The Dreams | Tórshavn, Faroe Islands, Denmark | 2006–2014 | A pop punk band. |
| Dresden 45 | Houston, Texas, US | 1985–1993 | A hardcore punk/crossover thrash band. |
| Driller Killer | Malmö, Sweden | 1993–2009 | A crust punk/death metal band. |
| Dritte Wahl | Rostock, East Germany | 1988–present | A German punk/crossover thrash band. |
| Dr. Know | Oxnard, California, US | 1981–1991, 1998–2010, 2012–present | A nardcore/crossover thrash band fronted by child star Brandon Cruz. |
| The Drones | Manchester, England, UK | 1975–1982, 1999, 2015–present | An English punk rock/pub rock band. |
| Dropdead | Providence, Rhode Island, US | 1991–present | A hardcore punk who draw on crust punk, powerviolence, D-beat, and thrashcore. |
| Dropkick Murphys | Quincy, Massachusetts, US | 1996–present | A Celtic punk/Oi! band. |
| Drunk Injuns | San Jose, California, US | 1983–present | A skate punk band. |
| The Ducky Boys | Boston, Massachusetts, US | 1995–present | A street punk band. |
| Dwarves | Chicago, Illinois, US | 1986–present | Formerly a garage punk band then a notorious shock rock band. The band is now known for their irreverent attitude and diverse punk rock sound. |
| DYS | Boston, Massachusetts, US | 1983–1985, 2010–present | A hardcore punk/heavy metal band. |
| Dystopia | Orange County, California, US | 1991–2008 | A sludge metal/crust punk band. |

== E ==
| Band name | Origin | Years active | Brief summary |
|---|---|---|---|
| E!E | Příbram, Czech Republic | 1987–present | A punk rock band. |
| Early Graves | San Francisco, California, US | 2007–2021 | A crust punk/metalcore/hardcore punk/sludge metal/thrash metal band. |
| Earth Crisis | Syracuse, New York, US | 1989, 1991–2001, 2007–present | A metalcore/hardcore punk band. |
| Eater | Finchley, North London, London, England, UK | 1976–1979, 1996–1997, 1999, 2003, 2006, 2022–present | A classic punk rock band. |
| Eamon McGrath and the Wild Dogs | Edmonton, Alberta, Canada | 2006–present | A punk rock/indie rock/folk band. |
| EA80 | Mönchengladbach, Germany | 1979–present | A classic punk rock/Deutschpunk band. |
| Ebba Grön | Stockholm, Rågsved, Sweden | 1977–1983, 1995, 2003 | One of the most popular Swedish punk rock bands. |
| Ed Banger and the Nosebleeds | Wythenshawe, Manchester, England, UK | 1976–1978, 2014–present | A punk rock band known for the later success of many of its members, which include Morrissey (of the Smiths), Billy Duffy (The Cult), and Ed Garrity (Slaughter & The Dogs). |
| Eddie and the Hot Rods | Rochford, Essex, England, UK | 1975–1981, 1984–1985, 1992, 1994, 2005–2006, 2019, 2021–2022 | A pub rock/punk rock/hard rock/power pop band. |
| The Effigies | Chicago, Illinois, US | 1980–1986, 1987–1990, 1992, 1995–1996, 2004–2009 | A punk rock/post-punk band. |
| The Ejected | Dagenham, London, England, UK | 1981–1983, 1999, 2014, 2015 | A punk rock/indie rock/alternative rock/heavy metal band. |
| Ekko Astral | Washington, D.C., US | 2021–present | A noise punk/pop punk/post-hardcore/riot grrl/queercore band. |
| electric eels | Cleveland, Ohio, US | 1972–1975 | A proto-punk/art punk/noise rock band with industrial guitars, clever lyrics and a tendency to nihilistic violence. |
| Electric Frankenstein | Whippany, New Jersey, US | 1991–present | A hard rock/garage punk/punk rock/heavy metal band. |
| Eleventyseven | Laurens, South Carolina, US | 2002–2014, 2016–present | A Christian rock/synth-pop/pop punk band, that has also used various other elements into their music. |
| Ellegarden | Ichikawa, Chiba, Japan | 1998–2008, 2018–present | A pop punk/punk rock/alternative rock band. |
| Embers | Oakland, California, US | 2004–present | A black metal/doom metal/crust punk band. |
| Embrace | Washington D.C. | 1985–1986 | A hardcore punk/post-hardcore band that was one of the original pioneers of emocore. |
| Embrace Today | Boston, Massachusetts, US | 1998–2006 | A metalcore band whose early sound was in style of youth crew. |
| Endpoint | Louisville, Kentucky, US | 1988–1994, 2010 | A hardcore punk/emo/melodic hardcore band. |
| Enemy You | San Francisco, California, US | 1997–2007 | A punk rock/pop punk/melodic hardcore band. |
| Energy | Stoughton, Massachusetts, US | 2006–present | A melodic hardcore/horror punk/hardcore punk/pop punk band. |
| English Dogs | Grantham, England, UK | 1981–1987, 1993–1999, 2007–2016 | A hardcore punk/crossover thrash/heavy metal/thrash metal band. |
| Engst | Berlin, Germany | 2015–present | A punk rock/pop punk band that primarily uses German lyrics. |
| Ensign | New Brunswick, New Jersey, US | 1995–present | A hardcore punk band. |
| Eppu Normaali | Ylöjärvi, Finland | 1976–present | A band known for their later new wave/blues rock/heartland rock/roots rock/rock and roll, but earlier releases were pop punk. |
| The Ergs! | South Amboy, New Jersey, US | 2000–2008, 2010, 2016, 2017–present | A pop punk band. |
| Eskorbuto | Santurtzi, Spain | 1980–1998 | A punk rock band from Santurtzi (Greater Bilbao). They have been one of the most influential bands for Spanish and Latin American punk rock. They are known for their strong attitude and crude lyrics. They are one of the first bands to perform punk rock with lyrics in Spanish. |
| Eve 6 | La Crescenta-Montrose, California, US | 1995–2004, 2007–present | A pop punk band that plays mostly alternative rock/post-grunge music. |
| Excuse 17 | Olympia, Washington, US | 1993–1995 | A punk rock queercore band. |
| The Ex | Amsterdam, Netherlands | 1979–present | A band active in a variety of punk rock-related genres such as anarcho-punk/punk jazz/post-punk. |
| The Expelled | Leeds, West Yorkshire, England, UK | 1981–1984, 1999–2003 | A punk rock/street punk band. |
| Exploding White Mice | Adelaide, Australia | 1983–1999 | A pop punk band. |
| The Exploited | Edinburgh, Scotland, UK | 1978–present | One of the founding hardcore punk bands, later turning into a crossover thrash band. |
| The Explosion | Boston, Massachusetts, US | 1998–2007, 2011, 2014, 2016, 2019–present | A punk rock/skate punk/melodic hardcore band. |
| Extreme Noise Terror | Ipswich, Suffolk, England, UK | 1985–present | A grindcore/death metal/crust punk band. |
| The Eyeliners | Albuquerque, New Mexico, US | 1995–2005 | An all female pop punk band. |

== F ==
| Band name | Origin | Years active | Brief summary |
|---|---|---|---|
| The F-Ups | Rochester, Minnesota, US | 1999–2006, 2020–present | A punk rock band are best known for their song 'Lazy Generation' which was featured on NHL 2005 and Burnout 3: Takedown, being the theme song for Takedown. After the 2006 breakup, several of the members formed a new band Hang 'Em High, which itself disbanded in 2014. |
| Fabulous Disaster | San Francisco, California, US | 1998–2007 | A pop punk band. |
| Face to Face | Victorville, California, US | 1991–2004, 2008–present | A punk band best known for their song "Disconnected", which has been frequently played by KROQ. |
| The Faction | San Jose, California, US | 1982–1985, 1989, 2001–2005, 2014–2020 | A skate punk/hardcore punk/punk rock band. |
| The Faith | Washington, D.C., US | 1981–1983 | A D.C. hardcore/melodic hardcore/emo band led by Alec MacKaye, brother of Minor Threat frontman Ian MacKaye. |
| Fairweather | Virginia, US | 1999–2003, 2011–present | An indie rock/alternative rock/emo/pop punk/post-hardcore band. |
| The Falcon | Chicago, Illinois, US | 2004–present | A punk rock supergroup with members or former members of The Lawrence Arms, Alkaline Trio, Rise Against, and other bands. |
| The Fall | Manchester, UK | 1976–2018 | A pioneering band who helped invent post-punk fronted by the late Mark E. Smith. |
| Fall of Efrafa | Brighton, England, UK | 2005–2009 | An influential crust punk/post-metal/hardcore punk/post-hardcore band. |
| Fang | Berkeley, California, US | 1981–1989, 1995–present | A hardcore punk band. |
| Farben Lehre | Płock, Poland | 1986–present | A punk rock/reggae rock/alternative rock band. |
| The Fartz | Seattle, Washington, US | 1981–1983, 1999–2003 | A hardcore punk band on Dead Kennedys' lead singer Jello Biafra's record company, Alternative Tentacles. |
| Los Fastidios | Verona, Italy | 1991–present | A punk rock band. |
| Fatal Microbes | England, UK | 1978–1979 | A punk rock/post-punk band. |
| Fear | Los Angeles, California, US | 1977–present | A hardcore punk band. |
| Fenix TX | Houston, Texas, US | 1995–2002, 2005–2006, 2009–present | A pop punk/skate punk/punk rock band. |
| Feeling B | East Berlin, East Germany | 1983–1993, 2007 | A punk rock/experimental rock band. Two of their members later formed the band Rammstein. |
| Ferocious Dog | Warsop, Nottinghamshire, UK | 2011–present | A folk punk/Celtic punk band. |
| Fiasco | Brooklyn, New York, US | 2005–2012 | A three-piece hardcore punk/noise rock/math rock band. |
| Fidlar | Los Angeles, California, US | 2009–present | A punk rock/garage punk/skate punk band featured on Conan, in 2016, where they performed "West Coast." |
| The Fight | Dudley, England, UK | 2000–2009 | A pop punk band. |
| Figure Four | Winnipeg, Manitoba, Canada | 1997–2006, 2011–2013 | A hardcore punk/metalcore band. |
| Figures of Light | New Brunswick, New Jersey, US | 1970–1972, 2006–2015 | A proto-punk band best known for their song "It's Lame." |
| Filth | East Bay, California, US | 1989–1991, 2010 | A hardcore punk/crust punk band. |
| Filthy Thieving Bastards | Oakland, California, US | 2000–present | A punk rock/celtic rock/folk rock band. |
| Final Conflict | Long Beach, California, US | 1983–present | A hardcore punk/thrash metal/crossover thrash band. |
| Finley | Legnano, Lombardy, Italy | 2003–present | A punk rock band that uses pop punk/alternative rock/pop rock rhythms. |
| First Arsch | Schwerin, East Germany | 1986–1993, 1995 | A punk rock/experimental rock band. |
| Fit For Rivals | Jacksonville, Florida, US | 2009–present | An alternative rock/pop punk/hard rock/emo band. |
| The Fits | Blackpool, England, UK | 1979–1985, 2011 | A classic punk rock band. |
| Fitz of Depression | Olympia, Washington, US | 1987–1997, 2000, 2002–2019 | A hardcore punk band. |
| Five Iron Frenzy | Denver, Colorado, US | 1995–2003, 2011–present | A Christian ska/ska punk/Christian punk/alternative rock/pop punk band. |
| Flatcat | Belgium | 1993–present | A punk rock/pop punk/skate punk/alternative rock band. |
| Flatfoot 56 | Chicago, Illinois, US | 2000–present | An Oi!/Celtic punk/hardcore punk/punk rock/Christian punk band. |
| The Flatliners | Richmond Hill, Ontario, Canada | 2002–present | A punk rock/melodic hardcore/ska punk band. |
| Flema | Gerli, Argentina | 1987–2002, 2007–present | A punk rock band. |
| The Flesh Eaters | Los Angeles, California, US | 1977–1983, 1990–1993, 1999–present | A classic punk rock band. |
| Fleshies | Oakland, California, US | 1999–present | A punk rock band. |
| Flipper | San Francisco, California, US | 1979–1987, 1990–1993, 2005–present | A noise rock/punk rock/post-punk/hardcore punk/post-hardcore band. Credited as one of Nirvana's biggest influences. |
| Flogging Molly | Los Angeles, California, US | 1994–present | A celtic punk/folk punk band. |
| Fluffy | London, England, UK | 1994–1998 | A punk rock band. |
| Flux of Pink Indians | Bishop's Stortford, Hertfordshire, England, UK | 1980–1986 | An anarcho-punk/post-punk band. |
| The Flys | Coventry, England, UK | 1976–1980 | A classic punk rock band. |
| F-Minus | Huntington Beach, California, US | 1995–2004 | A hardcore punk/crust punk band. |
| FM Static | Toronto, Ontario, Canada | 2003–2011 | A pop punk/Christian rock/emo band. |
| Fokofpolisiekar | Bellville, South Africa | 2003–present | An Afrikaans punk rock/pop punk band. |
| Fonzie | Lisbon, Portugal | 1996–present | A pop punk/pop rock/skate punk/alternative rock/melodic hardcore band. |
| Fools Dance | Horley, Surrey, England, UK | 1983–1987 | A punk rock/gothic rock/new wave band. |
| forgetters | Brooklyn, New York, US | 2009–2013 | A punk rock band. |
| Forgotten Rebels | Hamilton, Ontario, Canada | 1977–present | A classic punk rock band. |
| Foreign Legion | Merthyr Tydfil, Wales, UK | 1984–1991, 2000–present | Wales's longest running punk rock/street punk/Oi! band. |
| Foss | El Paso, Texas, US | 1993–1995 | A post-hardcore/emo band, best-known (retrospectively) because Texas politician Beto O'Rourke was a member. |
| Four Walls Falling | Richmond, Virginia, US | 1987–1995 | A hardcore punk band. |
| Four Year Strong | Worcester, Massachusetts, US | 2001–present | A pop punk/melodic hardcore band. |
| FPB | Teplice, Czech Republic | 1980–1987, 1990, 2008–present | An early Czechoslovak punk rock band, notable for integrating musical complexity and poetry into their music. |
| Frankenstein Drag Queens from Planet 13 | Landis, North Carolina, US | 1996–2002, 2004–2005 | A horror punk/glam punk band. |
| Frenzal Rhomb | Sydney, Australia | 1992–present | A punk rock/skate punk/melodic hardcore band. |
| Free Throw | Nashville, Tennessee, US | 2012–present | A punk rock/post-hardcore/indie rock band. The vocalist described the band's sound as being derived from "underground punk emo." |
| The Freeze | Scotland | 1976–1981 | A classic punk rock band. |
| The Freeze | Cape Cod, Massachusetts, US | 1978–present | A hardcore punk band. |
| Frightwig | San Francisco, California, US | 1982–1994, 2012–present | An all female feminist punk rock band. |
| The Frisk | Berkeley, California, US | 2000–2005 | A punk rock band. |
| Frodus | Washington, D.C., US | 1993–1999, 2009 | A post-hardcore/art rock/math rock band. |
| From Ashes Rise | Nashville, Tennessee, US | 1997–2005, 2010–present | A crust punk band. |
| The Frustrators | New England, US | 1999–present | A punk rock band. |
| The F.U.'s | Boston, Massachusetts, US | 1982–1985, 2010–present | A hardcore punk band. |
| Fucked Up | Toronto, Ontario, Canada | 2001–present | Polaris Music Prize-winning hardcore punk band. |
| Fuel | East Bay, California, US | 1989–1991 | A post-hardcore/punk rock band. |
| Fugazi | Washington, D.C., US | 1986–2003 | One of the first and most important post-hardcore bands. |
| Funeral for a Friend | Bridgend, Wales, UK | 2001–2016, 2019–present | A post-hardcore/hardcore punk band. |
| Fun People | Campana, Argentina | 1989–2001 | A straight edge melodic hardcore band. |
| Funeral Dress | Antwerp, Flanders, Belgium | 1985–present | A street punk band. |
| Fun Things | Brisbane, Queensland, Australia | 1979–1980 | A punk rock band. |
| Fuzigish | Johannesburg, Gauteng, South Africa | 1997–present | A ska punk band. |
| F.Y.P | Torrance, California, US | 1989–1999 | A punk rock band. |

== G ==
| Band name | Origin | Years active | Brief summary |
|---|---|---|---|
| Gallhammer | Tokyo, Japan | 2003–2013 | An all female doom metal/black metal/crust punk band. |
| Gang Green | Boston, Massachusetts, US | 1980–1983, 1984–1992, 1996–1998, 2005–present | A hardcore punk/heavy metal/speed metal/crossover trash/skate punk band. |
| Gallows | Watford, Hertfordshire, England, UK | 2005–2015, 2018–2019 | A hardcore punk band. |
| Garotos Podres | Mauá, São Paulo, Brazil | 1982–2013 | A street punk/Oi! band. |
| The Gaslight Anthem | New Brunswick, New Jersey, US | 2006–2015, 2018, 2022–present | A heartland rock/punk rock/indie rock/folk punk band. |
| GBH | Birmingham, England, UK | 1978–present | A street punk/classic punk rock/hardcore punk band. |
| Generation X | London, England, UK | 1976–1981, 1993 | A punk rock/pop punk/new wave band led by Billy Idol. |
| Genocide Superstars | Örebro, Sweden | 1994–2004 | A hardcore punk/rock and roll band that disbanded after guitarist/vocalist Mieszko Talarczyk was killed in the 2004 tsunami. |
| Germs | Los Angeles, California, US | 1976–1980, 2005–2009, 2013 | A hardcore punk band whose original singer, Darby Crash, died of a heroin overdose, days after performing a live show almost solely to raise the funds to buy the heroin. |
| The Ghost | Chicago, Illinois, US | 2001–2004 | A post-hardcore/indie rock/emo band. |
| The Ghost Inside | Los Angeles, California | 2004–2015, 2018–present | A metalcore/melodic hardcore band. |
| The Ghost of a Thousand | Brighton, England, UK | 2004–2011, 2012 | A hardcore punk/garage punk/post-hardcore band. |
| Ghoti Hook | Fairfax Virginia, USA | 1990–2002, 2009, 2022–present | A Christian Punk/pop punk band. |
| The Gits | Seattle, Washington, USA | 1986–1993 | A punk rock band. |
| Give Up the Ghost | Boston, Massachusetts, US | 1998–2004, 2011–present | A hardcore punk/melodic hardcore/emo band. |
| Glittertind | Lillesand, Oslo, Norway | 2001–present | A folk rock/punk rock band. |
| A Global Threat | Boston, Massachusetts, US | 1997–2007, 2013, 2016 | A street punk band. |
| The Go Set | Geelong, Victoria, Australia | 2003–present | A punk rock/folk punk/celtic punk band. |
| Gob | Langley, British Columbia, Canada | 1993–present | A pop punk band. |
| Goblini | Šabac, Serbia | 1992–2001, 2010–present | An alternative rock/punk rock band. |
| The God Awfuls | Los Angeles, California, US | 2002–present | The pop punk/street punk band's song "Watch It Fall" was featured in the soundtrack for the video game Tony Hawk's American Wasteland (2005). |
| Gogol Bordello | Lower East Side, New York, New York, US | 1999–present | One of the most popular Gypsy punk bands, known for its theatrical stage shows. |
| Goldblade | Manchester, England, UK | 1996–present | A hardcore punk/art punk band. |
| Goldfinger | Los Angeles, California, US | 1994–present | A ska punk/skate punk/pop punk band named after the 1964 James Bond film. |
| Good Charlotte | Waldorf, Maryland, US | 1995–2010, 2016–present | A pop punk/alternative rock/punk rock/emo/pop rock band. |
| Good Clean Fun | Washington, D.C., US | 1997–present | A hardcore punk/positive hardcore band. |
| Goodnight Nurse | Auckland, New Zealand | 2001–2010, 2023–present | A pop punk/alternative rock/punk rock/melodic hardcore band. |
| Good Riddance | Santa Cruz, California, US | 1986–2007, 2012–present | A melodic hardcore/pop punk/skate punk/hardcore punk band. |
| Gorilla Biscuits | New York, New York, US | 1986–1991, 1997, 2005–present | A hardcore punk band. |
| Government Issue | Washington, D.C., US | 1980–1989, 2007, 2010, 2012, 2014–2015 | A hardcore punk band. |
| Grade | Burlington, Ontario, Canada | 1994–2002, 2010–present | A hardcore punk/melodic hardcore/emo band. |
| Gray Matter | Washington, D.C., US | 1983–1986, 1990–1993 | A post-hardcore/emo/hardcore punk band. |
| Grayscale | Philadelphia, Pennsylvania, US | 2011–present | The band's style has been described as "pop punk," as well as "blending pure, raw emotion with elements of alternative rock and punk roots." |
| Grazhdanskaya Oborona | Omsk, Russia | 1984–1985, 1986–1990, 1993–2008, 2019–2020 | A noise rock/post-punk/alternative rock/psychedelic rock/garage rock band. |
| Green Day | Rodeo, California, US | 1986–present | A punk rock/pop punk/alternative rock/skate punk/power pop band that has achieved tremendous popular success, selling over 80 million albums worldwide. |
| Green Jellÿ | Buffalo, New York, US | 1981–1995, 2008–present | A comedy rock/heavy metal/punk rock/alternative metal band formerly known as Green Jellö, but were forced to change after a lawsuit. It is still pronounced the same. |
| Greenland Whalefishers | Bergen, Norway | 1994–Present | A Celtic punk/folk punk band. |
| Greyskull | Dallas, Texas, US | 2001–present | A punk rock/pop punk band. |
| Groovie Ghoulies | Sacramento, California, US | 1983–2007 | A classic punk rock/pop punk/horror punk band. |
| Guerilla Poubelle | Paris, France | 2003–present | A punk rock band. |
| The Gun Club | Los Angeles, California, US | 1979–1996 | A post-punk/punk rock/psychobilly/alternative rock/punk blues/cowpunk band. |
| Guns n' Wankers | England, UK | 1991–1994, 2019–present | A punk rock band. |
| Guttermouth | Huntington Beach, California, US | 1989–present | A punk rock/skate punk band known for their outrageous lyrics and behavior which are deliberately offensive and intended to shock, usually in a humorous and sarcastic manner. |
| Gwar | Richmond, Virginia, US | 1984–present | A thrash metal/hardcore punk/crossover thrash/heavy metal/shock rock/comedy rock/alternative metal band. |
| Gypsy Fly | Carol Stream, Illinois, US | 1998–present | A punk rock band. |

== H ==
| Band name | Origin | Years active | Brief summary |
|---|---|---|---|
| H_{2}O | New York, New York, US | 1994–present | A hardcore punk/punk rock/melodic hardcore/pop punk band. |
| Hagar the Womb | London, England, UK | 1980–1986, 2011–present | An anarcho-punk band. |
| Hagfish | Dallas, Texas, US | 1991–2001, 2003–2004, 2006, 2010, 2012–2019 | A punk rock/alternative rock/pop punk/melodic hardcore band. |
| Half Price | Cape Town, South Africa | 2001–present | A punk rock/skate punk band. |
| The Hanson Brothers | Victoria, British Columbia, Canada | 1984–2016 | A punk rock/pop punk band. Alter-ego of progressive rock band Nomeansno. |
| De Hardheid | Amsterdam, Netherlands | 1996–present | A ska punk/Dutch punk band. |
| Hard-Ons | Sydney, Australia | 1982–1994, 1997–present | A punk rock/power pop/hardcore punk band. |
| Hard Skin | Gipsy Hill, London, UK | 1996–present | A comedy Oi! band. |
| Hass | Marl and Recklinghausen, North Rhine-Westphalia, Germany | 1978–2001, 2013–present | A Deutschpunk band. |
| Hatebreed | Bridgeport, Connecticut, US | 1994–present | A metalcore/hardcore punk/beatdown hardcore band. |
| Haunted Garage | Los Angeles, California, US | 1985–1993, 1995, 2001, 2008, 2013–2021 | A horror punk/heavy metal/garage rock band fronted by actor Dukey Flyswatter. |
| Have Heart | New Bedford, Massachusetts, US | 2002–2009, 2019, 2024 | A hardcore punk/melodic hardcore band. |
| Have Nots | Boston, Massachusetts, US | 2006–present | The ska punk/punk rock band was formed in 2006, combining members of local bands Chicago Typewriter and Stray Bullets. |
| Hawk Nelson | Peterborough, Ontario, Canada | 2000–2020 | A pop punk/Christian rock/pop rock band that was voted "Favorite New Artist" by CCM Magazine in 2006. |
| Hazen Street | New York, New York, US | 2004–2006, 2009, 2011, 2012–present | A rap rock/hardcore punk/heavy metal band. |
| Heart Attack | New York, New York, US | 1980–1984 | A hardcore punk band. |
| The Heartbreakers | New York, New York, US | 1975–1980, 1984, 1990 | A classic punk rock band. |
| Hed PE | Huntington Beach, California, US | 1994–present | A rap metal/rap rock/nu metal/punk rock band. |
| Heideroosjes | Horst, Limburg, Netherlands | 1989–2012, 2019–present | A punk rock band. |
| The Hellacopters | Stockholm, Sweden | 1994–2008, 2016–present | A garage rock/garage punk/glam punk/hard rock band. |
| Hellbastard | Newcastle upon Tyne, England, UK | 1984–1992, 2007–present | A crust punk/crossover thrash/thrash metal band. |
| Hiatus | Liège, Belgium | 1989–1996, 2009–present | A crust punk/hardcore punk band. |
| Hightower | Paris, France | 2013–2021 | A punk rock band. |
| Hipodil | Sofia, Bulgaria | 1988–2004, 2006, 2011, 2013, 2018 | A punk rock/ska punk/crossover thrash band. |
| His Hero Is Gone | Memphis, Tennessee, US | 1995–1999 | A crust punk band. |
| Hi-Standard | Japan | 1991–2000, 2011–present | A melodic hardcore/punk rock/hardcore punk/pop punk band. |
| Hit the Lights | Lima, Ohio, US | 2003–present | A pop punk band. |
| The Hives | Fagersta, Sweden | 1993–present | A garage punk band known for their high-energy live performances and matching suits. |
| Hjertestop | Copenhagen, Denmark | 2004–2011 | A punk rock band. |
| Hladno Pivo | Zagreb, Croatia | 1988–present | A rock/punk rock/alternative rock band. |
| Hog Hoggidy Hog | Cape Town, South Africa, | 1995–present | A punk rock/ska punk/rock band. |
| Hogan's Heroes | Toms River, New Jersey, US | 1984–1993 | A hardcore punk/skate punk/thrashcore band. |
| Hole | Los Angeles, California, US | 1989–2002, 2009–2012 | An alternative rock/grunge/punk rock/noise rock/power pop band led by Courtney Love. |
| Home Grown | Orange County, California, US | 1994–2005, 2024 | A pop punk/skate punk/alternative rock/ska punk band signed to Liberation Records. |
| The Homosexuals | London, England, UK | 1978–present | A punk rock/post-punk band. |
| The Honor System | Chicago, Illinois, US | 1999–2004 | A punk rock/alternative rock band. |
| The Hope Conspiracy | Boston, Massachusetts, US | 1999–present | A hardcore punk band. |
| HorrorPops | Copenhagen, Denmark | 1996–present | A female fronted psychobilly/punk rock band whose guitarist is Kim Nekroman, bassist for Nekromantix. |
| Hot Cross | Philadelphia, Pennsylvania, US | 2000–2007 | A post-hardcore/hardcore punk band. |
| Hot Water Music | Gainesville, Florida, US | 1994–1998, 1998–2006, 2008–present | A punk rock/post-hardcore/emo band. |
| Ho99o9 | Newark, New Jersey, US | 2012–present | A punk rap/industrial hip hop band. |
| Hudkreft | Oslo | 2016–present | A punk rock band with ska influences and feminist themes. |
| The Hunkies | Poland | 2003–present | A punk rock/hardcore punk band. |
| Huggy Bear | London, England, UK | 1991–1994 | A Riot grrrl/art punk band. |
| Humble Gods | Hermosa Beach, California, US | 1990–1997, 2003–2009 | Daddy X of the Kottonmouth Kings was the original vocalist of this punk rock band. |
| Die' Hunns | California, US | 2000–2007, 2012–present | A punk rock band. |
| The Huntingtons | Baltimore, Maryland, US | 1993–2005, 2009–present | A punk rock band. |
| Hüsker Dü | Minneapolis–Saint Paul, Minnesota, US | 1979–1988 | A hardcore punk/alternative rock band. |
| Husking Bee | Japan | 1994–2005, 2012–Present | A pop punk band. |
| The Hydromatics | Michigan, US/Netherlands/Sweden | 1999–present | A garage punk band. |

== I ==
| Band name | Origin | Years active | Brief summary |
|---|---|---|---|
| I Against I | Dordrecht, Netherlands | 1994–2008, 2017–present | A punk rock band. |
| I Am the Avalanche | Brooklyn, New York, US | 2004–present | A punk rock/post-hardcore/indie rock/pop punk/melodic hardcore/emo band. |
| I Call Fives | Washington Township, New Jersey, US | 2006–2014, 2016, 2020–present | The band's pop punk debut album premiered at No. 13 on Billboard Top Heatseekers chart. |
| IHIWYP | Flagstaff, Arizona | 2002–2005 | A one-man electropop/punk rock band. |
| I Prevail | Southfield, Michigan, US | 2013–present | A post-hardcore/metalcore/pop punk/hard rock/alternative metal/rap metal band. |
| I Spy | Regina, Saskatchewan, Canada | 1991–1996 | An anarcho-punk/hardcore punk/melodic hardcore band known for its radical left-wing political subject matter. Todd Kowalski, now of Propagandhi, was part of the band. |
| Iceage | Copenhagen, Denmark | 2008–present | A post-punk/art punk/noise rock/post-hardcore band. |
| The Icemen | New York, New York, US | 1982–2013 | A crossover thrash/hardcore punk/metalcore/thrash metal band. |
| Icon A.D. | Leeds, West Yorkshire, England, UK | 1979–1981, 1982–1983 | An anarcho-punk band. |
| Icon For Hire | Decatur, Illinois, US | 2007–present | An alternative rock/rap rock/pop punk/punk rock/electronic rock/alternative metal band. |
| Icons of Filth | Cardiff, Glamorgan, Wales, UK | 1979–2004, 2014–present | An anarcho-punk band. |
| Idles | Bristol, England, UK | 2009–present | A post-punk/post-hardcore/hardcore punk/art rock band. |
| Iggy Pop | Muskegon, Michigan, US | 1963–present | A protopunk/garage rock musician that is considered one of the most influential musicians in the development of punk rock, and so nicknamed "the Godfather of Punk". Known for his wild stage antics. |
| Ignite | Orange County, California, US | 1993–present | A melodic hardcore/hardcore punk band. |
| Los Illegals | Los Angeles, California, US | 1979–present | A Chicano punk rock band. |
| The Inchtabokatables | Berlin, Germany | 1991–2002 | A folk rock/punk rock/industrial band. |
| Indecision | New York, New York, US | 1993–2000 | A hardcore punk band. |
| Infa Riot | London, England, UK | 1980–1985, 2011–present | A punk rock/Oi! band. |
| The Influents | East Bay, California, US | 1999–2003 | A punk rock/pop punk/alternative rock band. |
| In My Eyes | Boston, Massachusetts, US | 1997–2000 | A hardcore punk band. |
| Inocentes | São Paulo, Brazil | 1981–present | A post-punk band. |
| Inquisition | Richmond, Virginia, US | 1991–1996, 2007, 2010 | A punk rock/post-hardcore/emo band. |
| Inside Out | Orange County, California, US | 1988–1991, 1993 | A hardcore punk band. The band was fronted by Zack de la Rocha, later of Rage Against the Machine. |
| Instigators | Dewsbury, West Yorkshire, England, UK | 1980–present | An anarcho-punk band. |
| The (International) Noise Conspiracy | Umeå, Sweden | 1998–2009 | An indie rock/garage rock/punk rock/power pop/garage punk band. |
| International Robot | Minneapolis, Minnesota, US | 2000–2002 | A punk rock band featuring Danny Henry from The Soviettes. |
| The Interrupters | Los Angeles, California, US | 2011–present | A ska punk/punk rock/street punk/two-tone/ska band. |
| Intro5pect | Orange County, California, US | 1997–present | An electronic rock/punk rock band. |
| I.R.A. | Medellín, Colombia | 1985–present | A hardcore punk band. |
| Iron Chic | Long Island, New York, US | 2008–present | The punk rock/pop punk/emo/alternative rock band was formed in 2008 after the dissolution of Phil Douglas' and Brian Crozier's former band Latterman. |
| Iron Cross | Baltimore, Maryland, US | 1980–2012 | An Oi!/hardcore punk band. |
| Isocracy | Berkeley, California, US | 1986–88 | A hardcore punk band. |

== J ==
| Band name | Origin | Years active | Brief summary |
|---|---|---|---|
| The Jabbers | Lancaster, New Hampshire, US | 1977–1984, 2003–present | A hardcore punk band that shock rock musician, GG Allin, was originally part of. |
| Jackson United | California, US | 2003–2008 | A punk rock supergroup featuring Chris Shiflett from Foo Fighters and Scott Shiflett from Face to Face. |
| The Jam | Woking, Surrey, England, UK | 1972–1982 | A highly celebrated British band, both popularly and critically. Their early recordings were harder and more aggressive, while subsequent works honed the sounds of the late 1970s mod revival movement. |
| Jack Off Jill | Fort Lauderdale, Florida, US | 1992–2000, 2015 | An alternative rock/riot grrl/gothic rock/gothic metal band. |
| Janez Detd. | Grembergen, Belgium | 1995–2009, 2015–present | A skate punk/pop punk band. |
| Jawbox | Washington, D.C., US | 1989–1997, 2009, 2019–present | A post-hardcore/hardcore punk/noise rock band. |
| Jawbreaker | San Francisco, California, US | 1986–1990, 1991–1996, 2017–present | A very influential punk rock/pop punk/emo/hardcore punk/post-hardcore band which has often been credited with the beginning of modern emo music, though they differ greatly from what is considered emo music today. |
| J Church | San Francisco, California, US | 1992–2007 | A punk rock/pop punk band. |
| Jello Biafra and the Guantanamo School of Medicine | Los Angeles, California, US | 2008–present | A hardcore punk band founded by Dead Kennedys frontman Jello Biafra. |
| Jennifer Rostock | Berlin, Germany | 2007–present | A rock/alternative rock/punk rock/electropop band. |
| Jerry's Kids | Braintree, Massachusetts, US | 1981–1990, 1994, 2004–2018 | A hardcore punk band. |
| Jersey | Burlington, Ontario, Canada | 1996–2005, 2011–present | A ska/punk rock/pop punk band. |
| The Jesus and Mary Chain | East Kilbride, Scotland, UK | 1983–1999, 2007–present | An influential alternative rock/indie rock/noise pop/post-punk/shoegaze band. |
| JFA | Phoenix, Arizona, US | 1981–present | A skate punk/hardcore punk band. Initials stand for Jodie Foster's Army. |
| Jimmy Eat World | Mesa, Arizona, US | 1993–present | An alternative rock/emo pop/emo/power pop/pop punk band. |
| J.M.K.E. | Tallinn, Estonia | 1986–present | A punk rock band. |
| Joanna Gruesome | Cardiff, Wales, UK | 2010–2017 | A noise pop/punk rock/indie rock/nu gaze band. |
| Johnie All Stars | Medellín, Antioquia, Colombia | 1997–present | A punk rock band. |
| Johnny Hobo and the Freight Trains | Brattleboro, Vermont, US | 2000–2007 | An anarcho-punk/folk punk band fronted by Pat the Bunny. |
| Johnny Moped | Croydon, South London, England, UK | 1974–1978, 1981, 1992, 2007–2008, 2011–present | A punk rock band whose former members include Captain Sensible and Chrissie Hynde. |
| Jon Cougar Concentration Camp | San Diego, California, US | 1994–1999, 2009–present | A punk rock/pop punk band. |
| Johnny Socko | Bloomington, Indiana, US | 1990–2003 | A third wave ska/ska punk/indie rock band. |
| The Johnnys | Sydney, New South Wales, Australia | 1982–1989, 2004 | A pub rock/country/punk rock band. |
| The Joneses | Hollywood, California, US | 1981–1991, 1994–present | A glam rock/rock/punk rock band. |
| Josephine Collective | Johnson County, Kansas, US | 2004–2009 | The emo pop band signed to Warner Bros. Records after John Feldmann had been introduced to their music via Myspace and invited them to open for his band, Goldfinger. |
| Joy Division | Salford, Greater Manchester, England, UK | 1976–1980 | A highly influential post-punk/gothic rock band. |
| Joyce Manor | Torrance, California, US | 2008–present | An emo/pop punk/indie rock/power pop band. |
| The Joykiller | Huntington Beach, California, US | 1995–2003, 2015 | A punk rock/alternative rock side project band of Jack Grisham of T.S.O.L. |
| Jr. Gone Wild | Edmonton, Alberta, Canada | 1982–1995, 2013–2022, 2024–present | A cowpunk band. |
| Judge | New York, New York, US | 1987–1991, 2013–present | A straight edge hardcore punk/beatdown hardcore band. |
| Jughead's Revenge | Los Angeles, California, US | 1988–2001, 2009–present | A punk rock/skate punk/hardcore punk/melodic hardcore band. |

== K ==
| Band name | Origin | Years active | Brief summary |
|---|---|---|---|
| Kaaos | Tampere, Finland | 1980–1985, 1999–2005 | A hardcore punk/crust punk band. |
| Kamikazee | Quezon City, Philippines | 2000–2015, 2017–present | An alternative rock/Pinoy rock/pop punk/hard rock/hardcore punk/post-hardcore band. The band's song "Chicksilog" was nominated for Song Of The Year at the NU Rock Awards (2005). The band's song "Narda" won Song Of The Year at the NU Rock Awards (2006) and the Awit Awards (2007). |
| Kärbholz | Ruppichteroth, Germany | 2003–present | A punk rock/German rock/indie band. |
| KBO! | Kragujevac, Serbia | 1982–present | A hardcore punk band. |
| Kid Dynamite | Philadelphia, Pennsylvania, US | 1997–2000, 2003, 2005, 2010–2013 | A punk rock/hardcore punk band. |
| The Kids | Belgium | 1976–1985, 1996–present | A classic punk rock band. |
| Killing Joke | Cheltenham, England, UK | 1978–1996, 2002–present | A post-punk/gothic rock/new wave band who were highly influential on industrial rock. |
| Killing Time | New York, New York, US | 1988–1998, 2005–2011, 2023 | A hardcore punk band. |
| The Killjoys | Birmingham, England, UK | 1976–1978 | A classic punk band that featured member, Kevin Rowland. |
| Kill Your Idols | Long Island, New York, US | 1995–2007, 2013–present | A widely regarded hardcore punk band. |
| King Apparatus | London, Ontario, Canada | 1987–94, 2000 | A ska band. |
| King Rat | Denver, Colorado, US | 1994–present | A punk rock band |
| The King Blues | London, England, UK | 2004–2012, 2015–present | A folk punk/punk rock/ska punk band. |
| The Kings of Nuthin' | Boston, Massachusetts, US | 1998–2013 | A punkabilly/punk rock/rhythm and blues band. |
| KinoKlub | Zagreb, Croatia | 2008–2016 | A pop punk/pop rock band. |
| Kisschasy | Melbourne, Victoria, Australia | 2002–2015, 2022–present | An alternative rock/pop rock/pop punk/emo pop band. |
| Kiss It Goodbye | Seattle, Washington, US | 1996–1998, 2012 | A metalcore/hardcore punk band. |
| Klamydia | Vaasa, Finland | 1988–present | A punk rock band that is heavily influenced by the Ramones. |
| Knuckledust | London, England, UK | 1996–present | A beatdown hardcore band. |
| Knuckle Puck | Chicago, Illinois, US | 2010–present | The pop punk/emo band's name comes from the "knucklepuck" shot in ice hockey, which was popularized by the 1994 movie D2: The Mighty Ducks. |
| Komety | Warsaw, Poland | 2003–present | A punk rock/rockabilly/rock band. |
| The Kominas | Boston, Massachusetts, US | 2005–present | A taqwacore band playing Islam-themed punk rock/funk rock/alternative rock. |
| Korol i Shut | Saint Petersburg, Russia | 1988–2014 | A horror punk/folk punk/shock rock/art punk band. |
| Krasnaya Plesen | Yalta, Ukraine | 1989–present | A punk rock/hard rock/parody/spoken word band whose early sound was in style of post-punk. |
| Kraut | New York, New York, US | 1981–1986 | A hardcore punk band. |
| Die Kreuzen | Rockford, Illinois, US | 1981–1992, 2012–present | A highly influential post-punk/alternative rock band who were one of the first hardcore punk bands from the Midwest. |
| The Kristet Utseende | Sweden | 1994–1999, 2005–present | A punk rock and a self-proclaimed "narcotic gay metal" band from Sweden. |
| Kronstadt Uprising | Southend-on-Sea, Essex, England, UK | 1981–1986 | An anarcho-punk band. |
| KSMB | Skärholmen, Stockholm, Sweden | 1977–1982, 1993, 2015–present | A well-known classic punk rock band. |
| KSU | Ustrzyki Dolne, Poland | 1977–present | A classic punk rock band. |
| KUD Idijoti | Pula, Croatia | 1981–2011 | A punk rock/alternative rock band. |
