= Krasnaya =

Krasnaya refers to:

- Krasnaya River, Kaliningrad Oblast, Russia
- Krasnaya River (Kazanka), Republic of Tatarstan, Russia
- Krasnaya Sloboda, Azerbaijan
- Krasnaya Hotel, hotel in Odesa, Ukraine
- Krasnaya Plesen, Russian punk rock group
- Krasnaya Zvezda, Russian newspaper

== See also ==
- Krasnaya Polyana (disambiguation)
- Krasnaya Gorka (disambiguation)
