= List of Danish punk bands =

This is a list of Danish punk rock bands from Denmark.

== A ==
- ADS (band)

== B ==
- Before

== E ==
- Electric Deads

== H ==
- Hjertestop
- Horrorpops

== I ==
- Iceage

== L ==
- Lost Kids (Danish punk band)

== S ==
- Sods

== W ==
- War of Destruction
