= Johnie All Stars =

Johnie All Stars is a Colombian punk-rock band from Medellín, Antioquia, formed in 1997.

== Lineup ==
=== Current lineup ===
- Sebastian Regino: Vocals
- Juan Pablo Rodriguez: Guitar
- Camilo Gomez: Bass
- David Ortiz: Drums
- Paulo Arbelaez: Guitar

=== Other people that have played in the band ===
- Andres: Drums (1996-1996)
- Anibal Zapata: Drums (1996-2001)
- Miguel: Drums (2001-2002)
- Rafael Vega: Guitar(1996-2002)
- Sebastian Mejia: Bass (2004-2004), Guitar (2005)
- Pipe: Drums (2004-2004)
- Jorge: Bass (2006-2007)

== History ==
Johnie All Stars was formed by guitarists Juan Pablo and Rafael and bass player Camilo, who together with drummer Andres started a punk rock band to kill some time. After a couple of rehearsals, vocalist Sebastian kicked in and the first roster of the band was complete. Later, Anibal replaced Andres as the band's drummer. With this lineup, the band played for a couple of years, recording their first full-length album and touring around Colombia. After finishing the recording of their second album in 2000, Anibal left the band, and Johnie All Stars went through more drummers until finally breaking up in 2002. In 2004 they reunited to launch their second work with Koala Records, and settled on their current lineup.

The band was born in Medellín, Colombia, in 1997, forming what would be the first demonstration of the city's new punk-rock sound. The band, with a sound strongly influenced by the punk tendencies of California, sings powerful lyrics with strong words that talk about the everyday lives of the young punks and skateboarders of the '90s in the city. After several concerts sharing the stage with the most recognized bands of the city's punk-rock scene, they recorded their first album in 1998, titled «Sólo quiero diversión» ("I Only Want Fun"). This was the beginning of neo-punk in Medellín. «Sólo quiero diversión» led the way for the city's other bands and strengthened the local scene that gave Medellín recognition at the national level as the punk-rock city of Colombia. This same year, the band was featured at Rock al Parque (Rock at the Park), receiving the best comments thanks to their strength and the 110% effort they demonstrated at each show. After several more years of constant shows all over Colombia, sharing the stage with the country's various genres of rock bands, the band began writing and recording its second album. In 2004, «Por honor» ("For Honor") was released, with a rockier sound and their first widely successful song «Creer» ("Believe"), which was played continuously for two years. In 2005, they began the composition of their third album and released the song «Rocanrol» ("Rock and Roll"), which stayed at number 1 on Medellín's radio for three consecutive weeks. After almost two years of composition and preproduction, and concerts with bands like 2 Minutos (2 Minutes) and H2O, in 2008 they finished the recording of «Cinema Johnie». With this unprecedented album they made a strong return to the roots of rock 'n' roll and the band redefined Colombian punk-rock, as it had done from its beginnings over ten years before.

== Discography ==
=== Albums ===
- «Solo quiero diversión» ("I Only Want Fun"), 2000 (recorded in 1997)
- «Por honor» ("For Honor"), 2002 (recorded in 2000)
- «Cinema Johnie», 2008 (recorded in 2008)

=== Compilations ===
- «Mutante Vol. 1 (Esa chica)» ("Mutant Vol. 1 (This Girl)"), 2004
- «Tributo a la pestilencia (Soldado mutilado)» ("Tribute to the Plague (Mutilated Soldier)"), 2009
