= LeGrand (band) =

Swedish band

Legrand is a Swedish band from Malmö. The band was formed in Lund 1999 under the name Hype by the members Anders Tillaeus, Sinisa Krnjaic, Martin Lundgren and Mats Wallander. The following year, Anders' older brother Fredrik Tillaeus became a member and the band moved to Malmö. 2001 Mats was replaced by Martin’s younger brother Fabian Lundgren, and the same year, the band changed its name to Legrand. Their first album was released in October 2005.

== Members ==
- Anders Tillaeus – Vocals and guitar
- Fredrik Tillaeus – Keyboards
- Sinisa Krnjaic – Bass and back-up vocals
- Fabian Lundgren - Guitar
- Martin Lundgren - Drums
- Mats Wallander (1999-2001) - Guitar

== Discography ==
=== Album ===
- LeGrand (2005), RoastingHouse Records/Playground Music
- Sidewalks & stations (2007), RoastingHouse Records/Universal Music

=== Singles ===
- One quick look (2005)
- Brainy (2007)
- Brainy (2008, LTD Edition, vinyl)

=== Video ===
- One quick look (2005)
- Brainy (2007)

== Associated acts ==
- Drabness (Anders, Sinisa and Martin)
- Cruzin With Elvis In Bigfoot USA (Anders, Sinisa, Martin and Mats)
- Conway (Anders and Sinisa)
- Apple Core (Martin and Anders)
- Rosvo (Martin)
- Left Right Left (Martin)
