= I Hate You When You're Pregnant =

One-man band

I Hate You When You're Pregnant (abbreviated as IHYWYP) was a one-man punk-pop-electro-cock-rock band consisting of Phil Buckman on vocals, guitars, keys and drum machine, based in Flagstaff, Arizona. Started as a joke during Buckman's stint as a roadie for punk band Stab City Slit Wrists, and performing as the opening act for more prominent bands, IHYWYP gained more exposure in a 2002 article in Wired Magazine through its association with the videogame-themed rock band The Minibosses. His popularity and mainstream exposure peaked in 2005, but by 2006, Buckman ended performing as IHYWYP full-time.

== Media attention ==
After the Wired article's publication, IHYWYP's exposure continued to grow through blogs and word of mouth, and Buckman self-published his demos on his web site. In April 2004, Thrasher called a live IHYWYP show "a life-altering experience. In July 2005, Baltimore City Paper reported that Buckman's music "somehow manages to evoke the Beatles." In October 2005, a New York Times travel writer mentioned Buckman as "one of (Arizona's) most avant-garde performers."
