= Electric Deads =

Danish band

The Electric Deads was a Danish hardcore punk band with members from Espergærde, Fredensborg and Humlebæk formed in November 1981 by Nils Normann (bass), Kevin Andreasson (guitar, vocal), Bibi Blomstrøm (vocal) and Michael Mortensen (drums).

Electric Deads played along with other Danish bands like The Zero Point, War of Destruction, Razor Blades, Ads, City X, Freshly Riots, Dunderheads, Illegal 80, Vaccinen, Anfall, Kraft Durch Freude (KDF) and Disrespect. But also with Swedish bands Noncens and Das Psycho both from Helsingborg and finish band Kaaos from Tampere, Finland.

Electric Deads played at the Monody Festival in Aarhus in 1982 and 1983 together with a large number of Danish punk bands and post punk bands.

== Discography ==
- Electric Deads 7-inch EP (Electro Static Records, One dead, 1982). Recorded 2 May 1982 at Marco Polo Studio, Tikøb
- Anti-Sex 7-inch EP (Electro Static Records, 2 deads, 1982). Recorded 13 September 1982 at Karma Studie, Copenhagen
- Mind Bomb 7-inch EP (Electro Static Records, 3 deads, 1983). Recorded 24 April 1983 at ARP-Studio, Aarhus. Produced & mixed by Johnny Concrete & Electric Deads
- “Electric Deads” 7-inch EP. Re-release: Noise and Distortion Records, Noise 014, Belgium, 2010
- “Anti-Sex” 7-inch EP. Re-release: Noise and Distortion Records, Noise 015, Belgium, 2010
- “Mind-Bomb” 7-inch EP. Re-release: Noise and Distortion Records, Noise 016, Belgium, 2010

=== Compilations ===
- Welcome to 1984 (Maximumrocknroll Records, 1984)
- Complication: A Danish Compilation (Bondeskiver, 1984)
- Bloodstains Across Denmark (1997)
- Killed By Death #41 (1998)
- Killed By Hardcore 3 (2002)
