= Gypsy Fly =

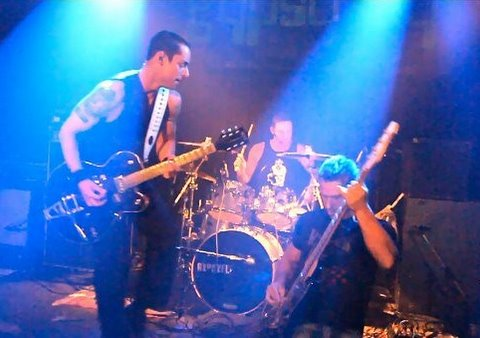
- Tom Hultsch, lead vocals and guitar; Dave Hultsch, drums; Jay Diebert, bass

Background information
- Origin: Carol Stream, Illinois, USA
- Genres: Punk rock
- Years active: 1998 - present
- Website: gypsyfly.net

Gypsy Fly (also known as Gypsyfly) is an American punk rock band formed in Carol Stream, Illinois, in 1998. Although the band was named after Jimi Hendrix and Curtis Mayfield references, the band's music does not bear a resemblance to either icon. Instead, Gypsy Fly's music has been described as “an undeniably catchy mix of metal and pop punk.”

== Band members ==
=== Current Members and Aliases ===
- Tom Hultsch (Tommy2K) – lead vocals and guitar
- Jay Diebert (Jimmy James) – bass
- Dave Hultsch (Ash) – drums

=== Former members ===
- Troy Thompson – lead vocals (1998–2003)
- Zach Pospisil – bass (1998–2003)

== History ==
=== Early years: Self Titled Album (1998–2000) ===
Gypsy Fly formed in 1998 at Glenbard North High School in Carol Stream (the same alma mater as The Smashing Pumpkins frontman Billy Corgan). The original line-up consisted of Troy Thompson (lead vocals), Tom Hultsch (guitar), Zach Pospisil (bass), and Dave Hultsch (drums). After self-releasing their first album, Gypsy Fly quickly gained attention on a local and national level. They interviewed with Chicago's WZRD (88.3 FM) radio, played local shows at Afternight Soundstage in Melrose Park, Illinois where they were televised on local television stations, and performed on The Jenny Jones Show. The band's single “Stripper Girlfriend” received radio attention, and even some play in local retail stores.

=== Bittersweetness: Pink Lavender (2000–2003) ===
After the success of the first album, Gypsy Fly channeled more of their indy influences, such as Ben Lee with Rancid, Black Flag, Idlewild, Pavement, and Red Hot Chili Peppers, to create their second album. This album had more of an edgy energy and a sound that was different compared to the harder sounds of Limp Bizkit and other popular bands during that time. This unique sound propelled Gypsy Fly even further. They were chosen as band of the week in a 94.7 “The Zone” (WZZN-FM) contest and won a bill at the House of Blues. Thereafter, they performed at the Metro in Chicago, and participated in the Vans Warped Tour by performing at First Midwest Bank Amphitheatre in Tinley Park, Illinois and Marcus Amphitheater in Milwaukee, Wisconsin, in addition to playing at Tower Records stores after their initial album release. In 2003, soon after Gypsy Fly's first set of shows to support their album, Zach departed the band. The band played with fill-in bass players until they finally found bassist Jay Diebert, but then, during the same year, lead vocalist Troy left the band.

=== Transformation: Labeled (2005–2007) ===
With Tom on lead vocals, Gypsy Fly released an EP and received an honorable mention for their original song “Young Again” from the Annual Billboard World Songwriting Contest. It placed in the top 1,500 entries. Also, radio DJ James Van Osdol gave extensive radio play to “Disappear,” which was played almost weekly on 94.7 “The Zone” (WZZN-FM). Yet, “California” was praised as “the strongest track” because “it is driven by strong bass line and more creative vocals.”

=== New beginning: Breathing Air (2007–2009) ===
Breathing Air, the first full-length album by the restructured band, was guitar driven, but more poppy than the previous records. Incidentally, Lou Hinkhouse, who had also worked with The Smashing Pumpkins, shot a video for Gypsy Fly's single “I Wanna Get Off,” which debuted on Chicago music television show JBTV. The song “All You Needed” played on “Q101” (101.1 WKQX), and the trio were regular guests on Fearlessradio.com's New Music Binge. During this time, they also had a weekly half-hour podcast on iTunes called Gypsy Fly Music Net.

=== New attitude: Silver or Lead (2009–present) ===
Finally capturing the band's energy of playing live, Silver or Lead has a more serious, yet irreverent tone. In his review of the album, Dean Ramos of Illinois Entertainer said, “Gypsy Fly can without a doubt ‘rawk!’ with the best of them.” Such a statement describes the band’s coming of age. With Silver or Lead, the band received the most airplay and radio station interviews, and Gypsy Fly’s music was played on unconventional formats such as the Waddle & Silvy show on ESPN 1000 (WMVP-AM). The band was also featured on the “Q101” website for an up-and-coming band contest sponsored by Old Style Beer. Director Lou Hinkhouse returned to shoot a video for “Play with Fire,” using the same camera used to film The Book of Eli. Gypsy Fly continued to promote the album at various venues throughout the city of Chicago and surrounding suburbs.

== Discography ==
- Gypsy Fly (1998)
  1. "Stripper Girlfriend"
  2. "Down to a Science"
  3. "Sun Called Shady"
  4. "Over and Under"
  5. "December"
  6. "Leif's Cure"
  7. "Tumbleweed"
  8. '"Mangled Moon"
  9. "Over a Lifetime / Neptune 9"
- Pink Lavender (2000)
  1. "Pop Song"
  2. "Caterpillar/Butterfly"
  3. "Butch Cassidy"
  4. "Just Us"
  5. "Sophia"
  6. "Pink Lavender"
  7. "Asshole"
  8. "Fallen Down"
  9. "Fans of a Feather"
  10. "Tie it Together"
- Labeled (2005) EP
  1. "4 Deep"
  2. "Thought It’d Last"
  3. "Disappear"
  4. "Young Again"
  5. "California"
- Breathing Air (2007)
  1. "Intro"
  2. "It Doesn’t Matter"
  3. "Finish Line"
  4. "I Wanna Get Off"
  5. "Flash Flash Photograph"
  6. "All You Needed"
  7. "Torture"
  8. "I’m Not Changing"
  9. "I Go You Go We Go"
  10. "Sure Shot"
  11. "If You Follow"
- Silver or Lead (2009)
  1. "Intro"
  2. "Play with Fire"
  3. "Silver or Lead"
  4. "Waiting for Sorry"
  5. "Pass Me the Dynamite"
  6. "You Don’t Know Me"
  7. "You’re Gonna Get It"
  8. "Heart Caves In"
  9. "Forever"
  10. "The Night Day Ended"
