= Hjertestop =

Danish music group

Hjertestop is a Danish punk band. It was formed in Copenhagen, in the scene around Ungdomshuset. The band consists of former members of Incontrollados, Død Ungdom, Young Wasteners, and Leathervein. Since 2004, the band have been playing concerts all over Europe, on 6–7 small tours and 2 larger tours. Amongst countries they have played in, is Norway, Germany, the Netherlands, Belgium, Czech Republic, Austria, Switzerland, Italy, France, Croatia, Ireland, Sweden, Finland, Turkey, Spain, Basque Country and the United States.

== Members ==
- Las Ballade (Vocals and bass) 2004–11
- Jesper (Drums) 2008–11
- Nikolaj (Guitar) 2004–11

Former members:

- Yogi (Vocal) 2004–05
- Hasse (Drums) 2004–08

== Discography ==
- Hjertestop Demo CS (Maximum OD/Kick'n'Punch, 2004)
- Åårh fuck! Det er Hjertestop! 7" (Kick'n'Punch, 2005/Fashionable Idiots, 2008)
- Vi ses i Helvede LP (Hjernespind, 2008/No Way Records, 2009)
- Musik for dekadente orer 7" (Kick'n'Punch, 2010/Fashionable Idiots, 2010)

== Compilations ==
- København 2005 CS (2005)

== See also ==
- List of Danish punk bands
