= Chronics =

Italian rock band

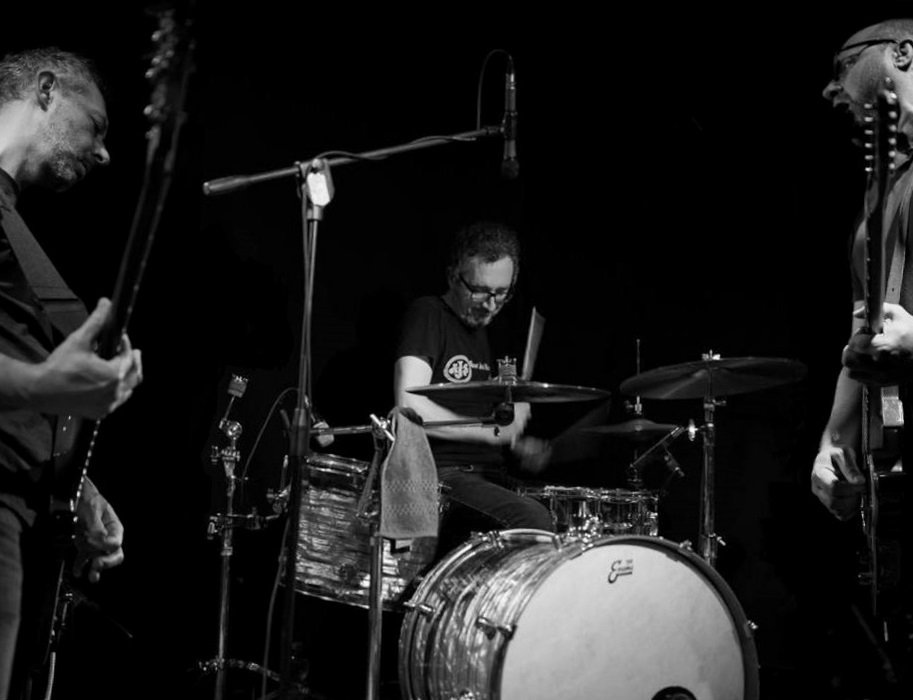
- Chronics (2020).

Background information
- Origin: Bologne, Emilia-Romagna, Italy
- Genres: Pop punk, punk rock, power pop, garage rock, garage punk
- Years active: 1996–present
- Labels: In the Red, Sympathy, Demolition Derby
- Members: Stefano Toma; Robbie Fabbri; Marco Turci

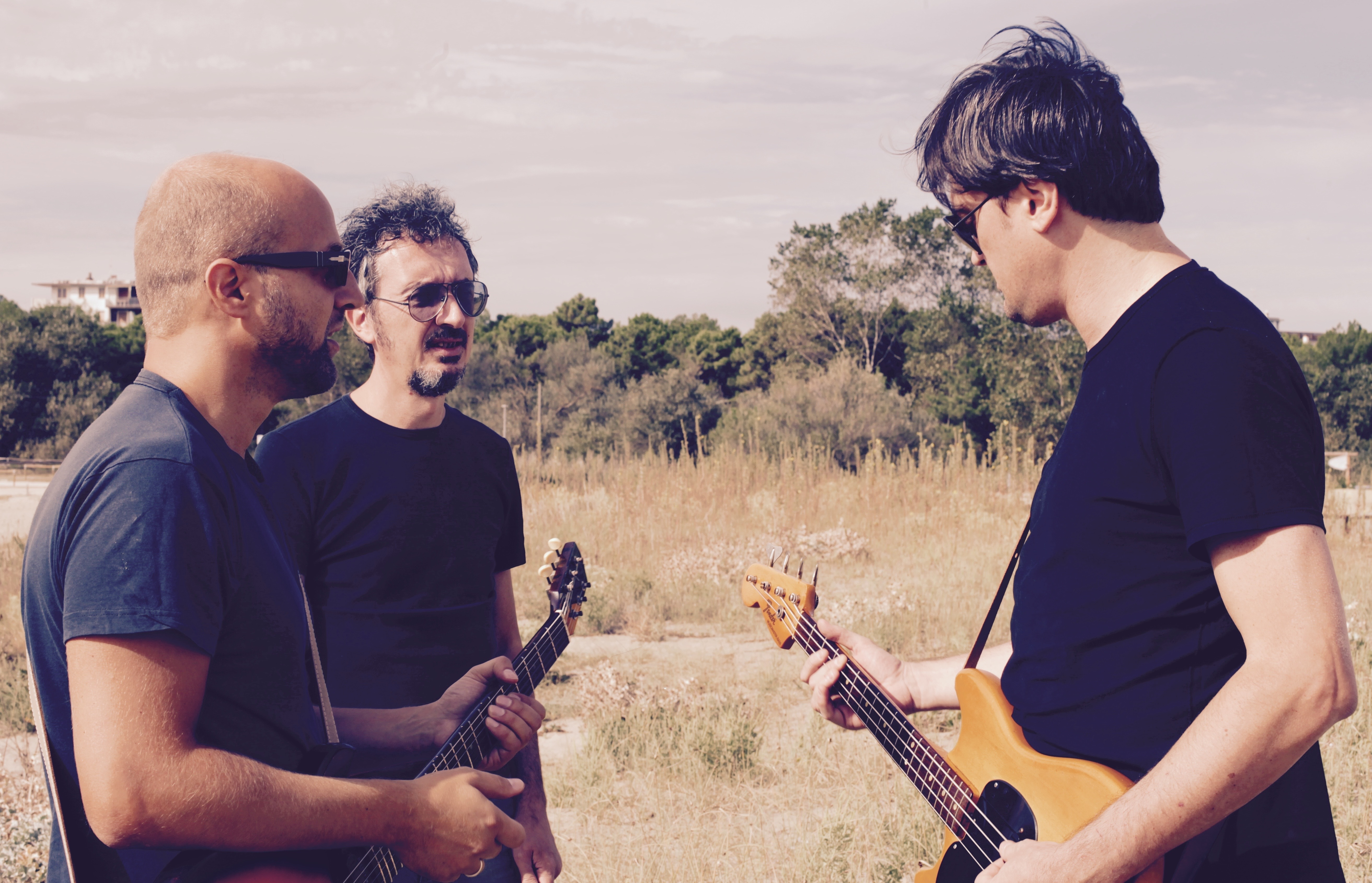
Chronics band Italy 1

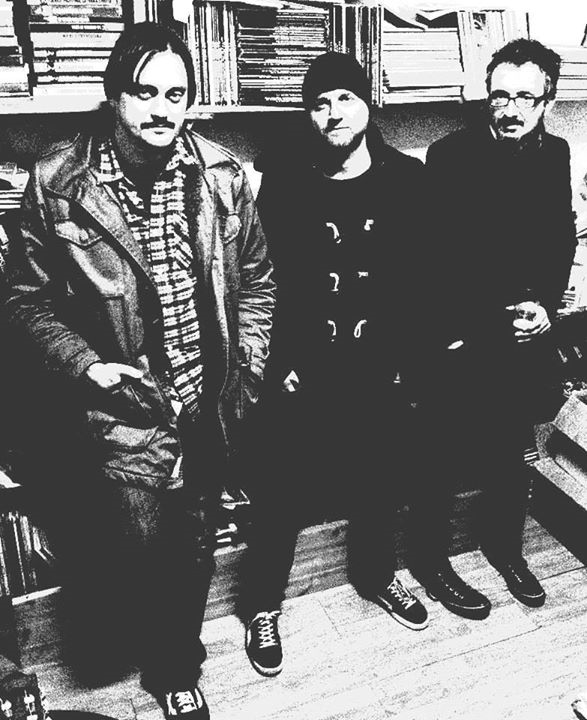
Chronics band Italy 2

Chronics are an Italian power pop and punk band, known for playing power pop with a garage rock attitude, and often drawing comparisons to The Saints and The Real Kids. In 1999 they released their debut single on Rip Off Records (a cult record label in the 90′s along with In the Red Records and Sympathy For The Record Industry), along with two full-length albums and two best of records. After several years idle, Chronics returned in 2014 by releasing a split single on Asian Man Records with Mike Watt and the Secondmen. In 2015 they release two more split 7-inch, another split single with Mike Watt (Minutemen, The Stooges) and a split single with Barrence Whitfield & the Savages.

== Discography ==
=== Albums ===
- It's too late, LP, Nitro, Belgium 2002
- Suggested for Mature Audiences, LP/cd, Nitro, Belgium 2004
- Do you love the sun?, LP, Puke’n’vomit Records, USA 2022; CD, Spaghetty Town Records, USA 2023

=== Singles ===
- First time, best time, 7” Rip Off Records, USA 1999

=== Splits ===
- From Ciro's to Starwood, Mike Watt and the Secondmen/Chronics, Split 7-inch, Asian Man Records, USA 2014
- Back In The Microwave, Mike Watt and the Secondmen/Chronics, Split 7-inch, Org Music, USA 2015
- Zig Zag Wanderer/I've Got Levitation, Barrence Whitfield And The Savages/Chronics, Split 7-inch, Easy Action Records, UK 2015

=== Best Of ===
- Late, lit-up & lewd (best of), cd, Hate, Italy 2003
- On Tape It Sounds Different (best of), cassette, USA Mooster, 2013

=== Compilations ===
- All This And More, cd, Fridge Records, 2000
- Burnin' Material – Call The Firemen!! cassette, AlphaMonic, 2003
- Locals Only CD compilation – La Skaletta Rock Club
- Wild Sound From The Past Dimension, Go Down records, 2008

== Personnel ==
- Stefano Toma – guitars, vocals (1996–today)
- Marco Turci – drums (2004-today)
- Michele Rizzoli - bass, vocals (2019-today)
- Giuliano Guerrini - guitars, vocals (2022-today)
- Stefano Felcini – bass, vocals (2013-today)
- Roberto Fabbri – bass, vocals (2000–2009)
- Davide Scibetta – drums (1996–2004)
- Gabriele Balducci – bass, vocals (1996–2000)
