= Drabness =

Swedish nu metal band

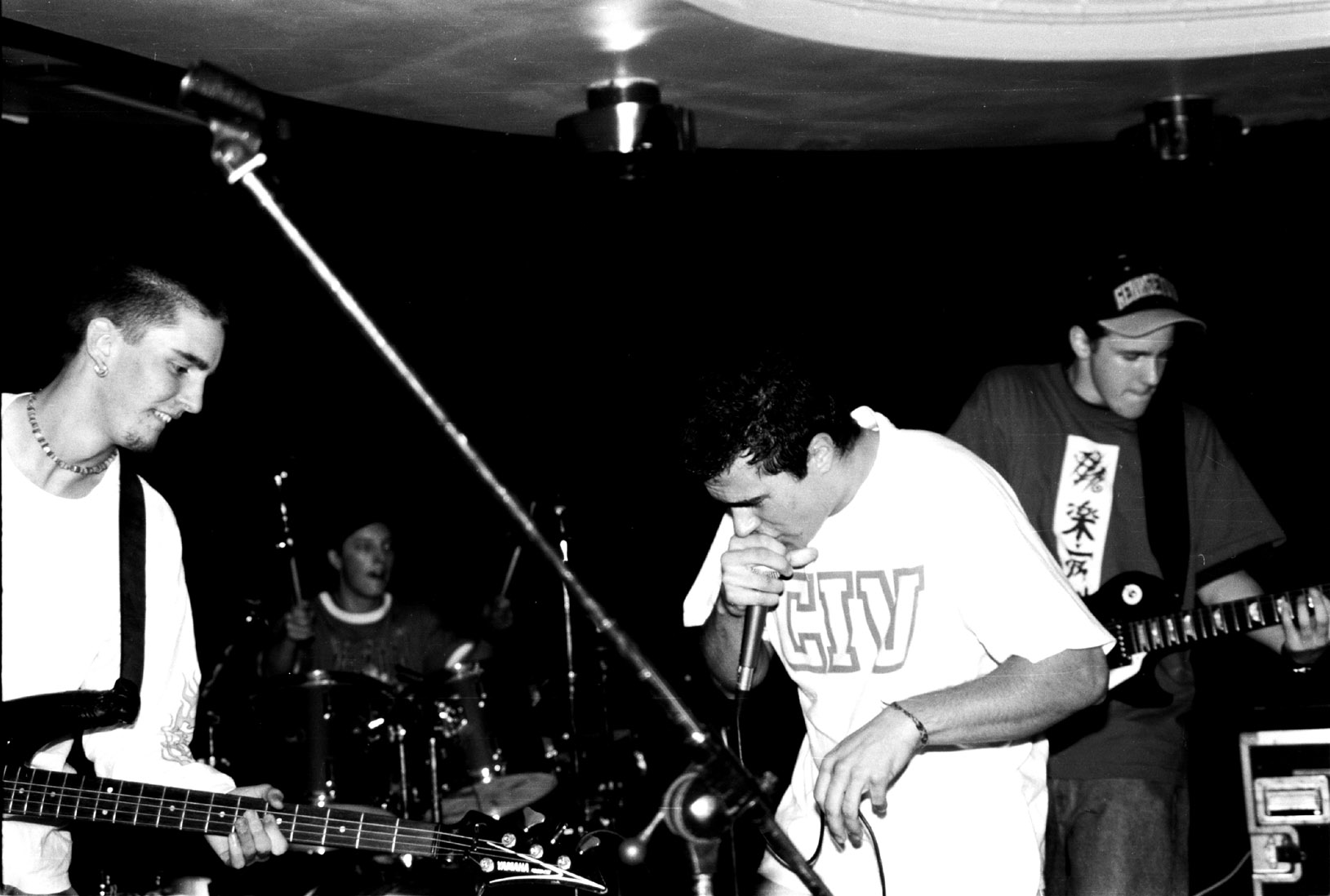
- Live at Folkets Park, Motala; Left to right: Morgan Gottfridsson, Martin Lundgren, Sinisa Krnjaic, Anders Tillaeus; Photo by: Mikael Stålsäter

Background information
- Origin: Motala, Sweden
- Genres: Nu metal, Hardcore Punk, Metalcore
- Years active: 1994–1998
- Labels: TPL Records

Drabness was a Swedish hardcore/nu metal band from Motala, active from 1994 to 1998.

== History ==
Anders Tillaeus, Martin Lundgren and Sinisa Krnjaic formed Drabness in the summer of 1994. After just a couple of months the band recorded their first demo. The year after Morgan Gottfridsson was added on guitar, the band played many shows in the nearby area and recorded two more demo tapes. In 1996 they were approached by the local record label, TPL Records and recorded the EP, Affliction.

In the beginning the main influences was bands like Snapcase, Earth Crisis, Refused, Breach, Biohazard and Sick of It All. But around 1997 the members began to be more and more influenced by bands like Faith No More, Sepultura and Korn. The demo Dramatically Uninspired, recorded the same year, resulted in a record deal offer from We Bite Records Europe (which was turned down). The band recorded their last demo in 1998 and decided to split up short after that.

Some years later, after relocating to Malmö, some of the members formed the rock act Legrand.

Drabness has been confirmed to play a reunion concert at the Motala Hardcorefestival 3 August 2013. The band also released their old demo tapes on Spotify.

== Band members ==
- Sinisa Krnjaic – bass, vocals (1994–1998, 2013)
- Anders Tillaeus – guitar, vocals (1994–1998, 2013)
- Martin Lundgren – drums (1994–1998, 2013)
- Morgan Gottfridsson – guitar (1995–1998)
- Nader Moini – bass (1996–1997)
- Jimmy Öster – bass (1998)
- Fabian Lundgren – guitar (2013)

== Discography ==
- Trapped (demo tape), 1994
- Drabness (demo tape), 1995
- Mask of Silence (demo tape), 1995
- Affliction (EP – TPL Records), 1996
- Dramatically Uninspired (demo CD), 1997
- [Unnamed] (demo CD), 1998
- Demo Collection, 2013

== Associated acts ==
- Legrand (Anders, Sinisa and Martin)
- Cruzin with Elvis in Bigfoot USA (Anders, Sinisa and Martin)
- Conway (Anders and Sinisa)
- Apple Core (Martin and Anders)
- Rosvo (Martin)
- Left Right Left (Martin)
