= Krasnaya Plesen =

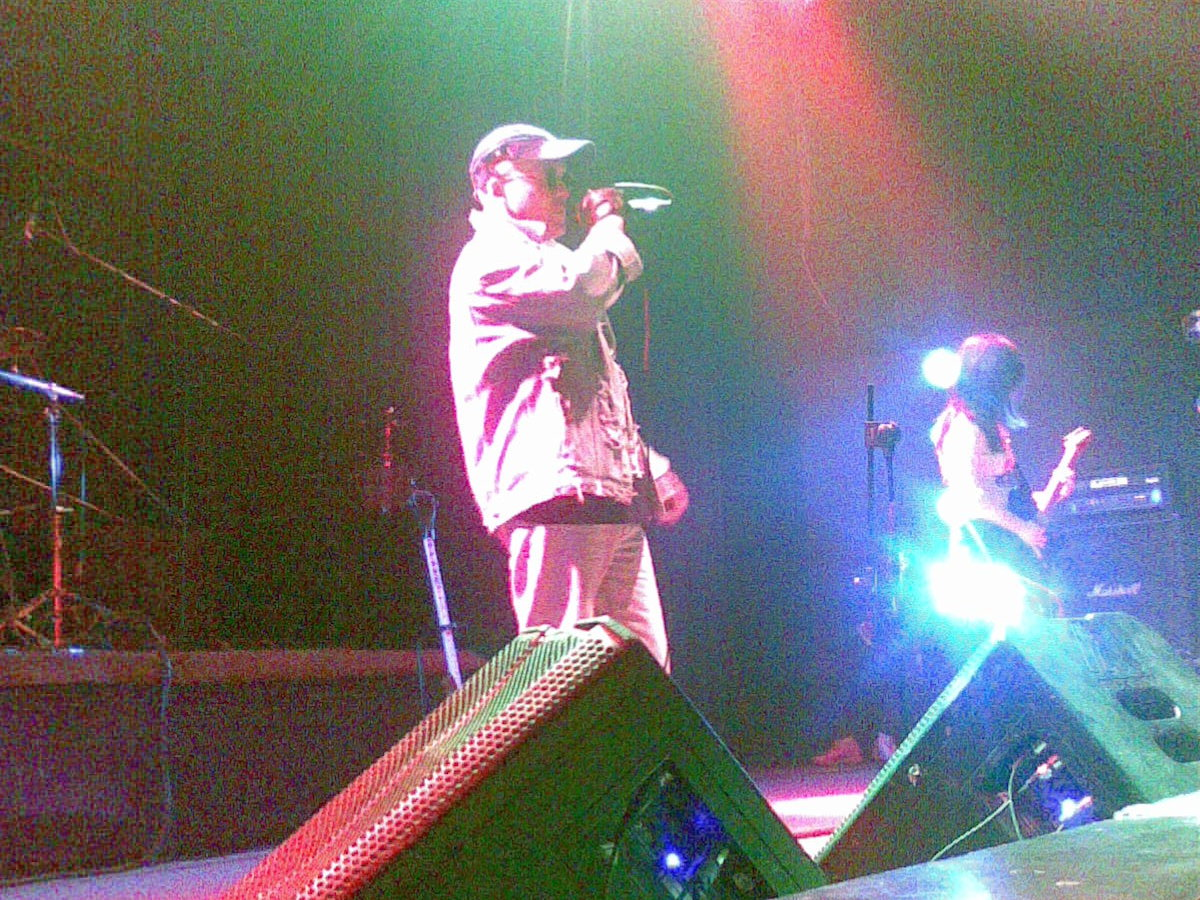
- Krasnaya Plesen live in Orlandina club, Saint Petersburg, 2012

Background information
- Origin: Yalta (Ukrainian SSR), USSR
- Genres: Post-punk (early); Punk rock, Hard rock, Parody music Spoken word
- Years active: 1989–present
- Labels: Zrec.ru
- Members: Pavel Yatsyna; Alexey Samartsev; Pavel Bezrukov
- Website: www.plesen.net

Krasnaya Plesen (Russian: Красная плесень, literally, red mold) is a Russian punk rock group based in Yalta, active from 1989 to this day and having released 71 full albums. The name of the band is a mockery on the term Krasnaya Presnya (Russian: Красная Пресня - Red Presnya). Presnya is a name of a neighbourhood in Moscow that saw uprisings during the Russian Revolution of 1905, and during the Soviet era was a popular name for factories and other organizations.

The group is known for its parodies of popular musical artists, especially from Russia, such as Ruki Vverh!, and the profane language used in many of its songs.

Frequent characters in the group's songs include Russian political figures such as Leonid Brezhnev and Mikhail Gorbachev, as well as made-up characters like Cheburator (a portmanteau of Cheburashka and Terminator), the rural metalhead Balalaykin and Corporal Srul'.

The group's members as of 2021 are Pavel Yatsyna (founder), Alexey Samartsev and Pavel Bezrukov.

== Discography ==
- 1991 – Album number 1 (remastered and re-release on CD in 2009 called "Red Scum")
- 1992 – A snivel in the left ear (and remastered reissue on CD in 2007)
- 1993 – Hit in the balls (Partial remastering and reissue on CD in 2007)
- 1993 – Metalhead Balalaykin (Remastered and re-release on CD in 2000)
- 1994 – New Year's Eve (Remastered and re-release on CD in 2006)
- 1994 – Vampire Kasholkin (Remastered and re-release on CD in 2005)
- 1994 – Ballads. Part 1 (re-released in 1996 titled "Ballads and Lyricism")
- 1994 – Sadistic couplets (reissued in 1996 with the title "A little boy and the other pioneering couplets", and the remastered edition on CD in 2004)
- 1994 – Ninth delirium (Remastered and re-release on CD in 2005)
- 1995 – Kabzdets to Chinese planes (Remastered and re-release on CD in 2006 and 2009 titled "Our locomotive, or the Chynese don't fly")
- 1995 – Sleeping Beauty - part 1
- 1997 – Sleeping Beauty - part 2
- 1997 – THE BEST, mother fucka!
- 1997 – Professor Bibizinsky and Chinese size of sneakers
- 1998 – Cinderella
- 1998 – Battle of Kulikovo
- 1998 – Bulbets to "Titanic"
- 1998 – Red Flower
- 1999 – Phone Sex
- 1999 – UNION of popular parodies 717
- 1999 – The Tale of Tsar Saltan - 1
- 2000 – UNION of popular parodies 828
- 2000 – Eternal kaif
- 2000 – UNION of popular parodies 1000
- 2001 – The Adventures of Little Red Riding Hood
- 2001 – UNION of popular parodies 3003
- 2001 – Spanner for the cruiser "Aurora"
- 2001 – UNION of popular parodies 2002
- 2002 – The Tale of Tsar Saltan - 2
- 2002 – UNION of popular parodies 6006
- 2002 – ... you all
- 2002 – UNION of popular parodies 4004
- 2003 – Suck, pops!
- 2003 – UNION of popular parodies 7007
- 2003 – From the margins to the Kremlin
- 2004 – UNION of popular parodies 8800
- 2004 – Fly-Ssykatuha
- 2004 – Bulbulator
- 2004 – UNION of popular parodies 9900
- 2004 – With Symphony Orchestra
- 2005 – UNION of popular parodies XXX - Cold Twenty
- 2005 – UNION of popular parodies 1.000.000
- 2005 – UNION of popular parodies 5.000.000
- 2006 – Trilogy of Russian punk rock
- 2006 – UNION of popular parodies 16,000,000
- 2006 – 46th album
- 2007 – UNION of popular parodies of "Fried thirty"
- 2007 – Disco of the Corporal Srul
- 2007 – Ballads. Part 2
- 2008 – ZheZZZt
- 2008 – Kerosene
- 2009 – Default
- 2010 – Demotivators
- 2010 – Ballads (BEST)
- 2010 – UNION of popular parodies in 2010 (55 anniversary album)
- 2012 – 21.12.12
- 2017 – Lost songs of "Krasnaya Plesen" band (1989—1995)
- 2019 – GOST 59-2019
- 2019 – Shovellica. Symphonic album by Pavel Yatsyna
- 2020 – UNION of parallel projects 60
- 2020 – Take the axe, chop the hardcore
- 2021 – Lost songs of "Krasnaya Plesen" band. Part 2
- 2021 – Dedicated to Viktor Tsoi
- 2022 – Lyricism
- 2022 – Punchy hits
- 2022 – Lost songs 3
- 2022 – Absurd couplets
- 2022 – Shovellica 2 (Symphonic album by Pavel Yatsyna)
- 2022 – Yemelya HD
- 2022 – Square glasses
- 2022 – Concert in Yalta Academic Theater
- 2023 – Generated without artificial intelligence
- 2023 – Ballads of 90s
- 2023 – Hammer on the left, sickle on the right!
- 2024 – Antique harp punk rock
- 2024 – Everlasting bulbets of Bibizinsky
- 2024 – Kubinsky plantain
- 2024 – Union of TOP 10 Parodies
- 2024 – Corporate party without Elon Musk
- 2024 – Study the cybernetics!
- 2024 – Dedicated to сreativity of Y. Khoy
- 2024 – New Year's ditties
- 2025 – Axe ditties
