= 2 Minutos =

Argentine musical group

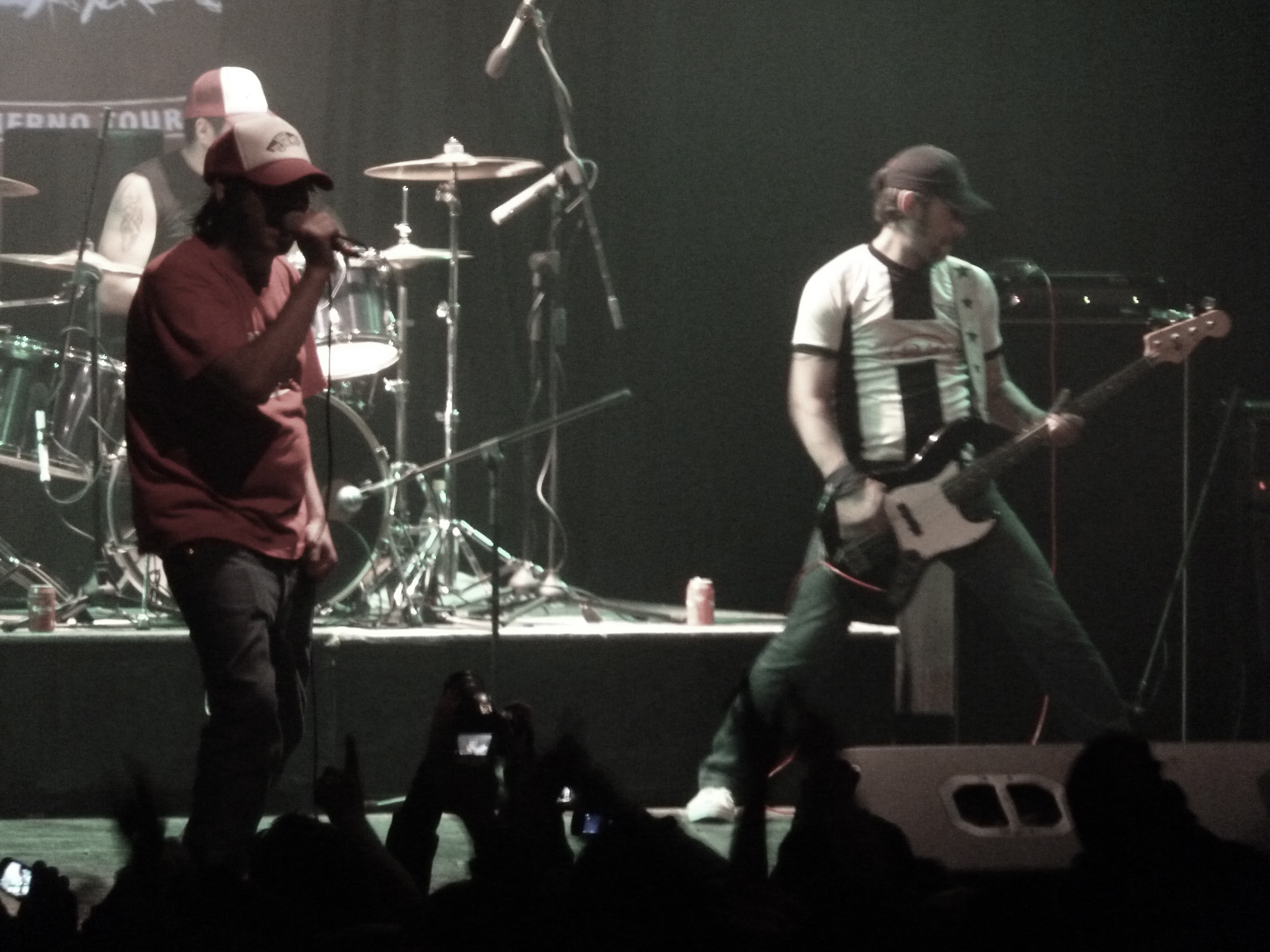
- 2 Minutos - At a concert in Chile,2011.

Background information
- Origin: Greater Buenos Aires, Argentina
- Genres: Punk rock Street Punk
- Years active: 1987 — present
- Labels: Pop Art Records, Sony BMG
- Members: Wálter 'Mosca' Velásquez (vocals); Marcelo "Pedro" Pedrozo (lead guitar); Pablo Coll (rhythm guitar); Alejandro Aidnajian "Papa" (bass); Monti Burns (drums)
- Website: 2minutosweb.com.ar

2 Minutos or Dos Minutos are a punk rock band from Valentín Alsina, Buenos Aires, Argentina. They have released ten albums since first receiving a contract by Phonogram in 1994. The band have toured mostly around Latin America.

== Biography ==
Singer Walter Velásquez first met bass player Aidnajan and guitarist Pedrozo at a Casanovas concert in 1987. The group they formed largely played the local circuit in the early 1990s. In 1992, the band participated in a collective album produced by an independent label called Mentes Abiertas, with the songs "Ya No Sos Igual" and "Arrebato". It caught the attention of the local Polygram A&R men who would sign the band soon after.

1994 would be the studio album debut for 2 Minutos. Valentín Alsina was named in honor of their hometown, and it turned into a bigger hit than even the band or the label had expected on the back of the hit single "Ya no sos Igual" ("You're not the same anymore"), about a corner store clerk whom they found out was also a Federal Police officer. A controversy erupted however between the band and "Pil Trafa", a member of Los Violadores, with Pil Trafa accusing 2 Minutos of having "un-punk" lyrics about beer, football, and street fighting, which he considered those of bored, middle-class 1990s suburban kids.

Nonetheless, 2 Minutos became a mid-1990s darling of the Argentine punk world, and they also gained large followings by simple word-of-mouth across Latin America, specially after the release of their Valentín Alsina follow-up, Volvió la Alegría, Vieja!. They also gained notoriety in the American punk scene, to the point they became the 1st Argentine punk band to dedicate a tour of the United States in 1995. A highlight of that tour was their performance at the CBGB club, which they sold out. Back home, they shared the stage with The Ramones during their 1996 farewell tour.

The third studio album was released in mid-1997. Postal 97 featured the hit singles "Gatillo fácil", "Qué yeta", and "Recuerdos en la arena". International success lead Polygram to renew and improve the contract for the band that year. They kept issuing albums every year or two. With the mid-2000s seeing the band as now weathered veterans of the punk movement, 2 Minutos released the studio album Un Mundo de Sensaciones, featuring the song "Aeropuerto" and including guest artists like Sebastián Teysera (La Vela Puerca), and Claudio O'Connor. In 2010, they released the album Vamos a la granja/Directo al infierno, which included covers of songs by The Clash, Sandro, Joaquín Sabina and Daniel Melero.

== Discography ==
- Valentín Alsina, 1994
- Volvió la alegría vieja, 1995
- Postal 97, 1997
- Advertencia, 1998
- Novedades, 1999
- Antorchas, 2000
- Vida Monótona, 2002
- Superocho, 2004
- Un Mundo de Sensaciones, 2006
- Vamos a la granja/Directo al infierno, 2010
- Valentin Alzheimer, 2013
