= Oi! Młodzież =

Studio album by The Analogs
- Released: 1996
- Recorded: 1995–1996
- Genre: Punk rock
- Label: Rock'n'roller

The Analogs chronology
Oi! Młodzież (1996)	Street Punk Rulez! (1997)

Oi! Młodzież (Polish for "Oi! Youth") is the debut album of Polish street punk band The Analogs. Released only as an audio cassette, as the Rock'n'roller label did not release CDs then. The album had been re-released as a split CD under the title Oi! Młodzież/Mechaniczna Pomarańcza, including a debut album from another Polish punk rock band, Ramzes & The Hooligans.

== Track listing ==
Titles in brackets are translated from Polish.

=== Side A ===
1. "Nasze Ciała" (Our Bodies)
2. "Oi! Młodzież" (Oi! Youth)
3. "Popatrz Na... Cena za życie" (Look at... A Price for Life)
4. "Szczecin"
5. "Te Chłopaki" (Those Boys)
6. "Ulica" (Street)

=== Side B ===
1. "He He He" (Get a rope - Cock Sparrer cover)
2. "Tygrys" (The Tiger)
3. "Analogs Rules"
4. "Jednoczcie się i zwyciężajcie" (Unite and Win)
5. "Strzelby z Brixton" (Guns of Brixton - The Clash cover)
6. "Dzieciaki atakujące policję" (Kids attacking cops)
7. "Cud" (A Miracle)

== Personnel ==
- Dominik Pyrzyna - vocals
- Marek Adamowicz - guitar
- Ziemowit Pawluk - drums
- Paweł Czekała - bass guitar
