= Street Punk Rulez! =

1997 studio album by the Analogs

Studio album by The Analogs
- Released: 1997
- Recorded: 1997
- Genre: Punk rock
- Label: Rock'n'roller
- Producer: Zdzisław Jodko

The Analogs chronology
Oi! Młodzież (1996)	Street Punk Rulez! (1997)	Hlaskover Rock (1999)

Street Punk Rulez! is a second album of Polish punk rock band The Analogs, and the band's first one released as a CD (alongside MC). The CD version includes three bonus tracks, re-recorded songs from the previous album Oi! Młodzież. Most of the lyrics and music for this album were written by Paweł Czekała, but as he was at the time of recording in prison, Artur Szmit substituted him as a bass guitar player.

== Track listing ==
Titles in brackets are translated from Polish.

1. "W Objęciach Diabła" (Embraced by the Devil)
2. "Droga" (The Road)
3. "Sprzedana" (Sold)
4. "Ostatni Krwawy Gang" (The Last Bloody Gang)
5. "Jah Love Agnostic Front"
6. "Rzeki Marzeń" (The Rivers of Dreams)
7. "Nina"
8. "Idą Chłopcy" (The Boys are Coming)
9. "Rebell Yell" (Billy Idol cover)
10. "Podobno" (Maybe)
11. "Błękitne Hełmy" (Blue Helmets)
12. "Oi! Młodzież '98" (Oi! Youth '98)
13. "Nasze Ciała '98" (Our Bodies '98)

=== Bonus tracks ===
1. "Analogs Rules '98"
2. "Dzieciaki atakujące policję '98" (Kids Attacking Cops '98)
3. "Szczecin '98"
4. "Popatrz Na... Cena za życie '98" (Look at... A Price for Life '98)

== Personnel ==
- Dominik Pyrzyna - vocals
- Marek Adamowicz - guitar
- Ziemowit Pawluk - drums
- Artur Szmit - bass guitar
