= Kroniki Policyjne =

Studio album by The Analogs
- Released: 2003
- Recorded: 2004
- Genre: Punk rock
- Length: 40:33
- Label: Jimmy Jazz Records
- Producer: Zdzisław Jodko

The Analogs chronology
Trucizna (2003)	Kroniki Policyjne (2003)	Talent Zero (2005)

Kroniki Policyjne (Polish for police chronicles) is an album released by Polish punk rock band The Analogs.

== Track listing ==
Titles in brackets are translated from Polish.

1. "Wszystko to co Mamy" (All What We Have)
2. "Nasze Piosenki" (Our Songs)
3. "Dziewczyna ze Zdjęcia" (A Girl From the Picture)
4. "Blues Pudła w Folsom" (Johnny Cash cover) (Folsom Prison Blues)
5. "Droga Pod Wiatr" (A Road Against the Wind)
6. "Kroniki Policyjne" (Police Chronicles)
7. "Mamy Mały Potwór" (Social Distortion cover) (Mommy's Little Monster)
8. "Marek"
9. "Miasta Gorzki Smak" (Cities' Bitter Taste)
10. "Nasza Krew" (Our Blood)
11. "Życie to jest Gra" (Life is a Game)
12. "Twoje Kłamstwa" (Your Lies)
13. "Mili Chłopcy" (Rose Tattoo cover) (Nice Boys)
14. "Pożegnanie" (Farewell)

=== Bonus ===
1. "Twoje Kłamstwa" (video)

== Personnel ==
- Paweł Czekała - bass guitar
- Paweł Boguszewski - drums
- Piotr Półtorak - guitar
- Jakub Krawczyk - guitar
- Dominik Pyrzyna - vocals

== Notes ==
1. This song is dedicated to band's friends, Iwan and Sebastian, who were already dead. The Analogs are singing about hooligans paradise somewhere in heaven, where they are supposed to meet one day.
