= Jeszcze Więcej Seksistowskich Piosenek =

Studio album by Anti Dread
- Released: 2005
- Recorded: 2005
- Genre: Punk rock
- Label: Jimmy Jazz Records
- Producer: Zdzisław Jodko

Anti Dread chronology
14 Seksistowskich Piosenek (2004)	Jeszcze Więcej Seksistowskich Piosenek (2005)	Wszyscy Jesteśmy Lesbijkami (2007)

Jeszcze Więcej Seksistowskich Piosenek (Even More Sexist Songs) is the second album released by Polish punk rock band Anti Dread.

== Track listing ==
italicised titles in brackets are translated from Polish.

1. "Wypłata" (Payment)
2. "Pierwszy raz" (First Time)
  - originally performed by The Boys
3. "Wibrator" (Vibrator)
4. "Kuloodporny" (Bullet Proof)
5. "Hydraulik" (Plumber)
6. "Sobotnia noc" (Saturday's Night)
7. "Kingston Radio"
8. "Nieprzystosowany" (Ill-adapted)
9. "Weekend"
  - originally performed by The Boys
10. "Miłość to..." (Love Is...)
11. "Punk rockowa dziewczyna" (Punk Rock Girl)
12. "Dzień i noc" (Day and Night)
13. "Chciałbym być twoim chłopakiem" (I Wanna Be Your Boyfriend)
  - originally performed by The Ramones
14. "Stara zabawa" (Old Fun)
15. "Dwa serca" (Two Hearts)
16. "Kingston Radio - Banach version"

=== Bonus ===
1. "Sobotnia noc - clip"

== Personnel ==
- Paweł Czekała - guitar
- Kanister - drums
- Piotr Półtorak - vocals
- Dydas - guitar
- Mirosław Lipniewski - bass guitar
