= Sprawiedliwość =

Studio album by The Hunkies
- Released: December 12, 2003
- Recorded: 2003
- Genre: Punk rock Hardcore
- Length: ???
- Label: Jimmy Jazz Records
- Producer: ???

The Hunkies chronology
Sprawiedliwość (2003)	To co nas łączy (2004)

Sprawiedliwość is the debut studio album of Polish hardcore band The Hunkies. The band is a project of The Analogs and Włochaty members.

The album has been released in 2003 by Jimmy Jazz Records from Szczecin.

== Track listing ==
1. Mój świat rozpadł się (eng. My world has fallen apart)
2. Bomby (eng. Bombs, Agnostic Front cover)
3. Nagłowki gazet (eng. Headlines)
4. Czemu wierzysz im? (eng. Why do you believe them?)
5. Twarda dyscyplina (eng. Hard discipline)
6. Droga do piekła (eng. Road to hell)
7. Pan zero (eng. Mr. zero)
8. Wasz świat (eng. Your world, TZN Xenna cover)
9. Podłe psy (eng. Ugly dogs)
10. Pokolenie (eng. Generation)
11. Twoje życie (eng. Your life)
12. Swastyki w szkolnych toaletach (eng. Swastikas in school toilets)
13. Opowieść (eng. A story)
14. Niesiesz swój krzyż (eng. You're bearing your cross)
15. Wojna z samym sobą (eng. War on yourself)
16. Sprawiedliwość (eng. Justice)

== Personnel ==
- Paweł Czekała ("Piguła") - bass guitar
- Paweł Boguszewski ("Dmuchacz") - drums
- "Palestyna" - guitar
- Piotr Skotnicki ("Skoda") - guitar
- "Nemeczek" - vocals

== Resources ==
1. Jimmy Jazz Records
