= Najlepsze z najgorszych =

Compilation album by The Analogs
- Released: 2005
- Recorded: 2005
- Genre: Punk rock
- Label: Jimmy Jazz Records
- Producer: Zdzisław Jodko

The Analogs chronology
| Talent Zero (2005) | Najlepsze z najgorszych (2005) | Poza prawem (2006) |

Najlepsze z najgorszych (Polish for the best of the worst) is a compilation vinyl longplay released by Polish punk rock band The Analogs specially for the band's 10th anniversary. It includes new versions of band's songs. In 2007 this album was re-released on CD, as a digipack. The first disc (CD) contained the same 15 tracks, as vinyl, the second one was DVD, including a TV movie "Te Chłopaki" (Those Boys), by Monika Petryczko with Marek Mucha. The movie was produced especially for 10th anniversary concert in Kontrasty club in Szczecin. The DVD Includes also 5 music video, with "Pieśń Aniołów" mainly from the released in 2006 album "Poza prawem" (Outlaw)

== Track listing ==
Vinyl LP Titles in brackets are translated from Polish.

1. "Wszystko to co Mamy" (All What We Have)
2. "Sprzedana" (Sold)
3. "Grzeczny Chłopiec" (Good Boy)
4. "Cena za Życie" (A Price for a Life)
5. "Era Techno" (Techno Era)
6. "Kroniki Policyjne" (Police Chronicles)
7. "Oi! Młodzież" (Oi! Youth)
8. "Dzieciaki Atakujące Policję" (Kids Attacking Cops)
9. "Hipisi w Martensach" (Hippies In Martens Boots)
10. "Max Schmeling"
11. "Ostatni Krwawy Gang" (The Last Bloody Gang)
12. "Trucizna" (Poison)
13. "Te Chłopaki" (Those Boys)
14. "Twoje Kłamstwa" (Your Lies)
15. "Pożegnanie" (Farewell)

CD Re-Release

Audio CD

1. "Wszystko to co Mamy" (All What We Have) - 2:55
2. "Sprzedana" (Sold) - 2:25
3. "Grzeczny Chłopiec" (Good Boy) - 3:26
4. "Cena za Życie" (A Price for a Life) - 2:51
5. "Era Techno" (Techno Era) - 2:55
6. "Kroniki Policyjne" (Police Chronicles) - 3:06
7. "Oi! Młodzież" (Oi! Youth) - 3:40
8. "Dzieciaki Atakujące Policję" (Kids Attacking Cops) - 3:19
9. "Hipisi w Martensach" (Hippies In Martens Boots) - 2:56
10. "Max Schmeling" - 2:35
11. "Ostatni Krwawy Gang" (The Last Bloody Gang) - 2:02
12. "Trucizna" (Poison) - 2:29
13. "Te Chłopaki" (Those Boys) - 2:29
14. "Twoje Kłamstwa" (Your Lies) - 2:22
15. "Pożegnanie" (Farewell) - 3:33

DVD

1. "Te Chłopaki" (Those Boys) - TV Movie
2. "Na ulicach miast" (On The Streets of Cities) - music video
3. "Twoje kłamstwa" (Your Lies) - music video
4. "Era techno" (Techno Era) - music video
5. "Zjednoczeni" (United) - music video
6. "Pieśń aniołów" (Song of Angels) - music video

== Personnel ==
- Paweł Czekała - bass guitar
- Paweł Boguszewski - drums
- Piotr Półtorak - guitar
- Jakub Krawczyk - guitar
- Dominik Pyrzyna - vocals

Gest Appearances:

- Katarzyna "Pigułka" Czekała - bass guitar in "Dzieciaki atakujące policję"
- Maciej "Mroku" Mroczek - bass guitar in "Sprzedana|"
- Piotr "Skoda" Skotnicki - guitar in "Trucizna"
- Szymon "Kanister" Jędrol - drums in Oi! Młodzież"
- Lech "Lecho-Echo" Czarnecki - acoustic guitar in "Cena za życie"
