= Poza prawem =

Studio album by The Analogs
- Released: 2006
- Recorded: 2006
- Genre: Punk rock
- Label: Jimmy Jazz Records
- Producer: Zdzisław Jodko

The Analogs chronology
Najlepsze z najgorszych (2005)	Poza prawem (2006)

Poza prawem (Polish for behind the law) is an album released by Polish punk rock band The Analogs.

== Track listing ==
Titles in parentheses are translated from Polish.

1. "Pieśń aniołów" (The Angels' Song)
2. "Poza prawem" (Above The Law)
3. "Dźwięk rebelii" (Sound of Rebellion)
4. "39-45"
5. "Lato 95" (Summer of '95)
6. "Odbij się od dna" (Back From the Bottom)
7. "Zjednoczeni" (United)
8. "P.S.M" ( R.Y.M.W )
9. "Ten kraj" (This Country)
10. "Zawsze najgorsi" (Always The Worst)
11. "Prawo do pracy" (A Right to Work - Chelsea cover)
12. "Uliczni wojownicy" (Street Warriors)
13. "Władza albo śmierć" (Power or Death)
14. "Blizny alkohol i tatuaże" (Scars, Alcohol, and Tattoos)

== Personnel ==
- Paweł Czekała - bass guitar
- Kacper Kosiński - drums
- Piotr Półtorak - guitar
- Jakub Krawczyk - guitar
- Dominik Pyrzyna - vocals

Additionally, on "Pieśń Aniołów"

- Marta "Wiśnia" Wiśniewska - backing vocals
