= To co nas łączy =

Studio album by The Hunkies/Eye for an Eye
- Released: October 25, 2004
- Recorded: 2004
- Genre: Punk rock Hardcore
- Length: ???
- Label: Rock'n'roller; Pasażer
- Producer: Zdzisław Jodko

The Hunkies/Eye for an Eye chronology
Sprawiedliwość (2003)	To co nas łączy (2004)

This split CD contains songs by two Polish hardcore bands: The Hunkies and Eye for an Eye

== Track listing ==
=== The Hunkies tracks ===
1. Introduction
2. Teraz czy później (eng. Now or later)
3. Nadczłowiek (eng. Superhuman)
4. Nie wierzę z całych sił (eng. I strongly do not believe)
5. Twarda dyscyplina (eng. Hard discipline)
6. Hunkies
7. Jaki mam być (eng. What I'm supposed to be like)
8. Czy starczy sił? (eng. Will we have enough strength?)

=== Eye for an Eye tracks ===
1. Bramy (eng. Gates)
2. Manekin
3. Własny ląd (eng. An own land)
4. Hardcore (?) łączy nas (eng. Hardcore (?) is uniting us)
5. True till death
6. To (eng. It)
7. Wyjście z cienia (eng. Exit from the shadow)

== Personnel ==
=== The Hunkies ===
- Paweł Czekała ("Piguła") - bass guitar
- Paweł Boguszewski ("Dmuchacz") - drums
- "Palestyna" - guitar
- Piotr Skotnicki ("Skoda") - guitar
- "Nemeczek" - vocals

=== Eye for an Eye ===
- Anka - vocals
- Tomek - guitar
- Bartek - guitar
- Damian - bass guitar
- Rafał - drums

== Resources ==
1. Jimmy Jazz Records
