= Blask Szminki =

Studio album by The Analogs
- Released: 1999–2001
- Recorded: 2001
- Genre: Punk rock
- Label: Rock'n'roller

The Analogs chronology
Oi! Młodzież/Mechaniczna Pomarańcza (2000)	Blask Szminki (1999)	Trucizna (2003)

Blask Szminki (Polish for glitter of a lipstick) is an album released by Polish punk rock band The Analogs.

== Track listing ==
Titles in brackets are translated from Polish.

1. "Blask Szminki" (Glitter of a lipstick)
2. "Naiwne Dzieciaki" (Naive Kids)
3. "Sny o Potędze" (Dreams of Power)
4. "Hipisi w Martensach" (Hippies in Martens Boots)
5. "Era Techno '99" (Techno Era '99)
6. "Football '99"
7. "Ukrzyżowani '99" (Iron Cross cover) (Crucified '99)
8. "Niemy Krzyk '99" (Mute Shout '99)
9. "Historia '99" (The History '99)
10. "Gdzie Oni Są?" (Cock Sparrer cover) (Where are They Now?)
11. "Inne Prawo Dla Nich" (The 4-Skins cover) (One Law For Them)
12. "Max Schmeling (live)"
13. "Te Chłopaki (live)" (Those Boys)
14. "Oi! Mlodzież (live)" (Oi! Youth)

== Personnel ==
- Dariusz Tkaczyk - vocals
- Ziemowit Pawluk - drums
- Dariusz Stefański - guitar
- Paweł Czekała - bass guitar
- Błażej Halski - guitar
- Grzegorz Król - guitar

== Notes ==
1. Grzegorz took part in recording tracks 5–9.
