= Trucizna =

Studio album by The Analogs
- Released: 2003
- Recorded: 2003
- Genre: Punk rock
- Label: Jimmy Jazz Records

The Analogs chronology
Blask Szminki (2001)	Trucizna (2003)	Kroniki Policyjne (2004)

Trucizna (Polish for poison) is an album released by Polish punk rock band The Analogs.

== Track listing ==
Titles in brackets are translated from Polish.

1. "Trucizna" (Poison)
2. "Grzeczny Chłopiec" (Good Boy)
3. "Hipisi w Martensach" (Hippies in Martens Boots)
4. "Nie Namawiaj Nas" (Cock Sparrer cover) (Don't Persuade Us)
5. "Byłem Taki Sam" (I Used to be the Same)
6. "Teraz Chciałbym Wąchać Klej" (The Ramones cover) (Now I Wanna Sniff Some Glue)
7. "Nie Zatrzymasz Się" (You Won't Stop)
8. "Wspaniały Świat" (Wonderful World)
9. "Gdzie Się Najebać?" (Where to Get Drunk?)
10. "Nowe Sztandary" (New Banners)
11. "Oszukani" (The Cheated)
12. "Na Ulicach Miast" (In the Cities' Streets)
13. "Sznur" (Rope)
14. "Dziewczyna z Mercedesem (Klasy S)" (A Girl with Mercedes S-Class)

== Personnel ==
- Dariusz Tkaczyk - vocals
- Błażej Halski - guitar
- Jacek Tomczak - guitar
- Ziemowit Pawluk - drums
- Paweł Czekała - bass guitar
