= Wszyscy Jesteśmy Lesbijkami =

Studio album by Anti Dread
- Released: 2007
- Recorded: 2007
- Genre: Punk rock
- Label: Jimmy Jazz Records
- Producer: Zdzisław Jodko

Anti Dread chronology
Jeszcze Więcej Seksistowskich Piosenek (2005)	Wszyscy Jesteśmy Lesbijkami (2007)

Wszyscy Jesteśmy Lesbijkami (We Are All Lesbians) is the third album released by Polish punk rock band Anti Dread.

== Track listing ==
italicised titles in brackets are translated from Polish.

1. "Zabawka" (Toy)
2. "Zanim świat runie w gruzy" (Before the World Falls to Pieces)
3. "Reklamówka z Netto" (Bag from Netto)
4. "Zniszczyłaś mnie" (You Have Destroyed Me)
5. "Tajna Armia" (Secret Army)
  - originally performed by Cock Sparrer
6. "Moja droga życia" (My Way of Life)
7. "Roko"
8. "On płonie w Tobie" (He Burns Inside You)
9. "Włoski automat" (Italian Automate)
10. "Muszę ją mieć" (I've Got to Get Her)
11. "Mam erekcję" (I Have Erection)
  - originally performed by Turbonegro
12. "Zgubiłem mózg" (I've Lost My Brain)
13. "Dupy i forsa" (Pussy and Money)
  - originally performed by The Dictators

== Personnel ==
- Paweł Czekała - guitar
- Kanister - drums
- Andrzej - vocals
- Cl-Boy - guitar
- Mirosław Lipniewski - bass guitar
