= Anti Dread =

- Origin: Szczecin, Poland
- Genres: Punk rock
- Years active: 2003–present
- Label: Jimmy Jazz Records
- Members: Paweł Czekała; Grzesiek; Mirosław Lipniewski; Andrzej; Olaf
- Past members: Piotr Półtorak; Paweł Boguszewski; Błażej Halski; Kefir; Kanister; Dydas; Cl-Boy
- Website: www.antidread.inet.pl

Anti Dread is a Polish punk rock band playing since 2003. According to band's members the name means simply that none of them wear dreadlocks.

== Style ==
Anti Dread play melodic punk rock music, similar in style to that originating from the 1970s. The band avoids incorporating any political views into their songs and cover few social or economical issues. The situation is caused by the fact, that most of the band's members are experienced musicians, who had played in several projects throughout their lives and see Anti Dread as the space they can play for pure entertainment.

The band's musical inspirations can be observed through the bands they decided to cover on their albums. These include Cock Sparrer, The Dictators, Turbonegro, Ramones, Sex Pistols and Skrewdriver.

== History ==
Anti Dread logo with a slogan similar to God save the Queen, with the words God replaced with "Jah" and queen with "punx."

The band formed in 2003 in Szczecin as a new project of Paweł Czekała, The Analogs bass guitar player. He decided to play the guitar. He was joined by Błażej Halski (second guitar) and Paweł Boguszewski (drums). After quite a long search for vocalist Anti Dread chose Piotr Półtorak, who at the time sang in The Hunkies. The last position to be filled was that of bass guitar player. This was taken by Kefir.

In the end of 2003 the band's first record was released - 14 Seksistowskich Piosenek. As the title explains (14 Sexist Songs), the album contains fourteen songs, three of which are in fact covers. The record was released by Jimmy Jazz Records label.

After a few concerts Błażej decided to leave the band and move to Kielce and was replaced with Dydas, guitarist of another punk rock band from Szczecin - Włochaty. Soon after another changes took place. Paweł Boguszewski is replaced with Kanister and Kefir is replaced with Mirosław Lipniewski.

Second album - Jeszcze Więcej Seksistowskich Piosenek (Even More Sexist Songs) was released in the beginning of 2005. Besides 15 new songs it contained a clip for Sobotnia Noc song and reggae remix of Radio Kingston by Piotr Banach of Indios Bravos. The album did not vary from the first one very much, but contained wider variety of styles. Musicians included rhythms of reggae, ska or Californian punk rock alongside classic 1977 punk style.

After the second album had been released Dydas left the band and his position was taken over by Cl-Boy who also plays the guitar in Road Trip's Over band from Szczecin. In the end of 2006 Piotr Półtorak left Anti Dread. Andrzej from Wściekły Pies band became the new vocalist. In the autumn of 2006 the band recorded their third album Wszyscy Jesteśmy Lesbijkami (We Are All Lesbians). After recording had been finished Grzesiek took over drummer position from Kanister and Olaf replaces Cl-Boy.

The third album was released in 2007. The title, according to the band's members expresses the mere fact that all of them love women, this being the only possible explanation. The front cover had been drawn by Łukasz, vocalist of Bilety do Kontroli band. The record brought 13 new songs, including 3 covers. The general style of the album keeps up to band's stylistic. Songs do not cover important political or social issues and concentrate on less serious issues, like porn star Rocco Sifredi or problems with women.

== Members ==
=== Present members ===
- Andrzej – vocals
- Paweł "Piguła" Czekała – guitar
- Cl-Boy – guitar
- Mareczek – bass guitar
- Kacper – drums

=== Former members ===
- Mirosław "Miro" Lipniewski – bass guitar (2005–2008)
- Grzesiek – guitar (2007)
- Olaf – guitar (2007)
- Kanister – drums (2005–2007)
- Piotr Półtorak – vocals (2003–2006)
- Paweł Boguszewski – drums (2003–2005)
- Kefir – bass guitar (2003–2005)
- Dydas – guitar (2003–2005)
- Błażej Halski – guitar (2003)

== Discography ==
=== Studio albums ===
1. 14 Seksistowskich Piosenek, Jimmy Jazz Records, 2004
2. Jeszcze Więcej Seksistowskich Piosenek, Jimmy Jazz Records, 2005
3. Wszyscy Jesteśmy Lesbijkami, Jimmy Jazz Records, 2007
4. Zestaw do samobójstwa, Jimmy Jazz Records, 2008

=== Compilations ===
1. V/A - Prowadź Mnie Ulico, Jimmy Jazz Records, 2004
  Track 22 - Komputerowy wojownik
  Track 26 - Zjebany weekend
2. V/A - Prowadź Mnie Ulico Vol. 2, Jimmy Jazz Records, 2005
  Track 5 - Dzień i noc
  Track 9 - Wibrator
1. V/A - Tribute to Dezerter - Nie ma zagrożenia, jest Dezerter, Pasażer, 2006
  Track 20 - Poroniona generacja
2. V/A - Tribute to Partia, Jimmy Jazz Records, 2006
  Track 18 - Żoliboż-Mokotów
3. V/A - Prowadź Mnie Ulico Vol. 4, Jimmy Jazz Records, 2007
  Track 3 - Zabawka
  Track 17 - Muszę ją mieć
4. V/A - Street Rockers Vol. 1, Oldschool Records, 2007
  Track 6 - Soundsystem
  Track 15 - Rączki trzeba myć

== See also ==
- The Analogs
- The Hunkies
