= Wschód jest pełen słońca =

Wschd jest pełen słońca

Studio album by Karcer
- Released: 1997
- Recorded: 1997
- Genre: Punk rock
- Label: Rock'n'roller

Karcer chronology
Wschd jest pełen słońca (1997)	Nic nikomu o niczym (2002)

Wschód jest pełen słońca is the sixth album by Polish punk rock band Karcer.

== Track listing ==
1. Robotnicy nocnej zmiany (en. Night shift workers)
2. Młodość walcząca (en. Fighting youth)
3. Gest idoli (en. Idols' gesture)
4. Wschód jest pełen słońca (en. East is full of sunshine)
5. Nowe lepsze czasy (en. Better new days)
6. Wychodzę na ulicę (en. I'm going into the street)
7. Czas kurtyzan (en. Prostitutes' time)
8. 2000 lat (en. 2000 years)
9. Mitomania (en. Mythomania)
10. Roztrzelane krzesła (en. Shot down chairs)
11. Szeregowiec (en. Private)
12. Życie za hymn (en. Life for the anthem)
13. Ostatnie słowo (en. The last word)

=== Bonus CD tracks ===
1. Perfekcyjni (en. The perfects)
2. Chuj (en. Dick)

== Personnel ==
- Krzysztof Żeromski - guitar, vocals
- Przemysław Brosz - guitar
- Adam Lao - bass guitar
- Tomasz Fangrat - drums
