= Komety =

- Origin: Poland, Warsaw
- Genres: Punk / Rockabilly / Rock
- Labels: Jimmy Jazz Records
- Members: Lesław, W. Szewko, Arkus
- Website: Official Site

Komety is a Polish alternative group from Warsaw. Its line-up includes Lesław (voice, guitar, music, lyrics), W. Szewko (bass, voice) and Arkus (drums, voice). The group has created a characteristic musical/lyrical style. Before Komety, Lesław had been the leader of the now defunct group Partia.

The band described itself as Polish psycho/rockabilly.

In 2003, Komety released their debut album on Jimmy Jazz Records.

In 2005, the Via Ardiente album was released and they played at the punk rock festival Antifest in the Czech Republic. Komety 2004-2006, featuring previously unreleased material, came out the following year. The next album, Akcja v1 came out in 2007. Singles taken from that album topped many Polish charts.

In early 2008, Mexico's Esquilo Records released The Story of Komety a collection of the group's best-known selections. In March 2009, Zloto Aztekow, a live album also featuring new studio recordings, came out on Jimmy Jazz Records.

Komety are one of the few Polish groups to have gained popularity abroad. Their songs have appeared on compilation albums in such countries as the US, France, Finland, Germany, Japan, and Russia.

Their album Luminal came out in April 2011. Their album Paso Fino was released in 2014 by Thin Man Records, and their album Bal nadziei was released in 2016, also by Thin Man Records. Their album Alfa Centauri released in 2020, and Ostatnie okrążenie released in 2024.

On April 3, 2022, Komety supported by Trojka performed a concert for their 20th anniversary.

== Members ==
- Lesław - vocals, guitar, song-writing
- Arkus - drums
- Pleban - double bass
- W.Szewko - bass guitar
- Riczmond - bass, vocals

== Discography ==
- 2003 - Komety
- 2005 - Via Ardiente
- 2006 - Via Ardiente - English version
- 2006 - Komety 2004-2006
- 2007 - Akcja v1
- 2008 - Akcja v1 - English version
- 2008 - The Story of Komety
- 2011 - Luminal
- 2014 - Paso Fino
- 2016 - Bal nadziel
