= Nic nikomu o niczym =

Studio album by Karcer
- Released: 2002
- Recorded: 2002
- Genre: Punk rock
- Length: ???
- Label: Rock'n'roller

Karcer chronology
Wschód jest pełen słońca (1997)	Nic nikomu o niczym (2002)

Nic nikomu o niczym is an album released by Polish punk rock band Karcer in 2002.

== Track listing ==
1. narkotyk
2. limity
3. byłem w twoim domu
4. the death is not the end
5. moje miasto
6. biegnę
7. chory i zły
8. jeśli będę chciał
9. zbrodnia i kara
10. kołysanka
11. bluesy pierdu punk
12. to ja
13. nic nikomu o niczym
14. wiejski magik (czyli zajebiście ciężki kamień)
15. razem i osobno
16. mówię nie

== Personnel ==
- Krzysztof Żeromski - guitar, vocals
- Adam Leo - bass guitar
- Daniel Łukasik - drums

== Resources ==
- Band's official site
- Jimmy Jazz Records
