= The Analogs =

Polish street punk band

- The Analogs live in London, November 2019

Background information
- Origin: Poland
- Genres: Punk rock; street punk; oi!
- Years active: 1995–present
- Labels: Rock'n'roller; Jimmy Jazz Records; Oldschool Records
- Members: Paweł "Piguła" Czekała; Kamil Rosiak; Przemysław "Benon" Kaczmarek; Max Matusewicz
- Past members: Ziemowit Pawluk; Dominik Pyrzyna; Artur Szmit

The Analogs are a Polish street punk band. Originating in Szczecin, they have been successful on the local and international punk rock scene with hundreds of concerts played across Europe as well as musical releases in Poland, Russia, and the USA. The Analogs have seen coverage in major Polish news outlets (such as Gazeta Wyborcza or Onet.pl) as well as many alternative music publications and punk zines.

Although almost absent from national radio and television stations, they are well known among the underground audience in Poland, as well as in Germany, Russia, Italy, Austria, Switzerland, the Czech Republic, and other countries where they often tour. They have been referred to as the most active and most popular street punk band in Poland, where they are seen as precursors of the genre and credited with popularising it in the country.

Despite originally being an "apolitical" formation, The Analogs have always been completely committed to anti-fascism and anti-racism. Eventually they started referring to themselves as "100% leftie" and began focusing on even more social issues in their songs. They have performed alongside influential ska artist Roy Ellis and recognise the multi-cultural roots of the skinhead subculture.

== Band history ==
=== 1995–1996: Formation and early days ===
In Szczecin during the spring of 1995, three members of the Polish ska group Dr. Cycos came together to start a new punk band: Paweł "Piguła" Czekała as the bassist, Marek "Oreł" Adamowicz on the guitar, and Ziemowit Pawluk as the drummer. Tomasz "Iwan" Iwanow was the first candidate for the role of vocalist, but he was quickly replaced by Dominik "Harcerz" Pyrzyna.

When the first album of The Analogs was released in 1996, Piguła was imprisoned for criminal activity. His imprisonment, spanning two sentences that lasted a total of nearly five years, affected him deeply; he later reflected on these experiences in some lyrics of the band's songs, of which he has always been the main writer. After leaving jail for the second time, Piguła became straight edge, dedicating his life to music and sports. These decisions would later inspire him and another band member to start Projekt Pudło in 2018.

During Piguła's troubles with the law, he was replaced on the bass first by Szymon Gebel and later by Artur Szmit. The first album, Oi! Młodzież ("Oi! Youth"), was received positively on the local alternative scene in 1996 and would go on to become one of the most iconic Oi! and punk releases in Poland. Originally sold only as a cassette tape, it saw several CD and vinyl re-releases, and is now considered a cult classic in the history of Polish punk rock.

Although the band would later become much more left-wing in its lyrical themes, their early image was "apolitical" – for which they faced backlash from some of the anarchist and feminist circles that have been active on the Polish punk scene from the start. Despite that, The Analogs remained committed to anti-fascism and took part in various musical initiatives that opposed racism (particularly among skinheads) in Poland.

At a time when the punk and skinhead scenes in the country were often quite violently opposed to each other, The Analogs (a group of three anti-Nazi skinheads and a punk singer) preached punk and skin unity, which made them very popular in the underground.

=== 1997–2005: Start of an international career ===
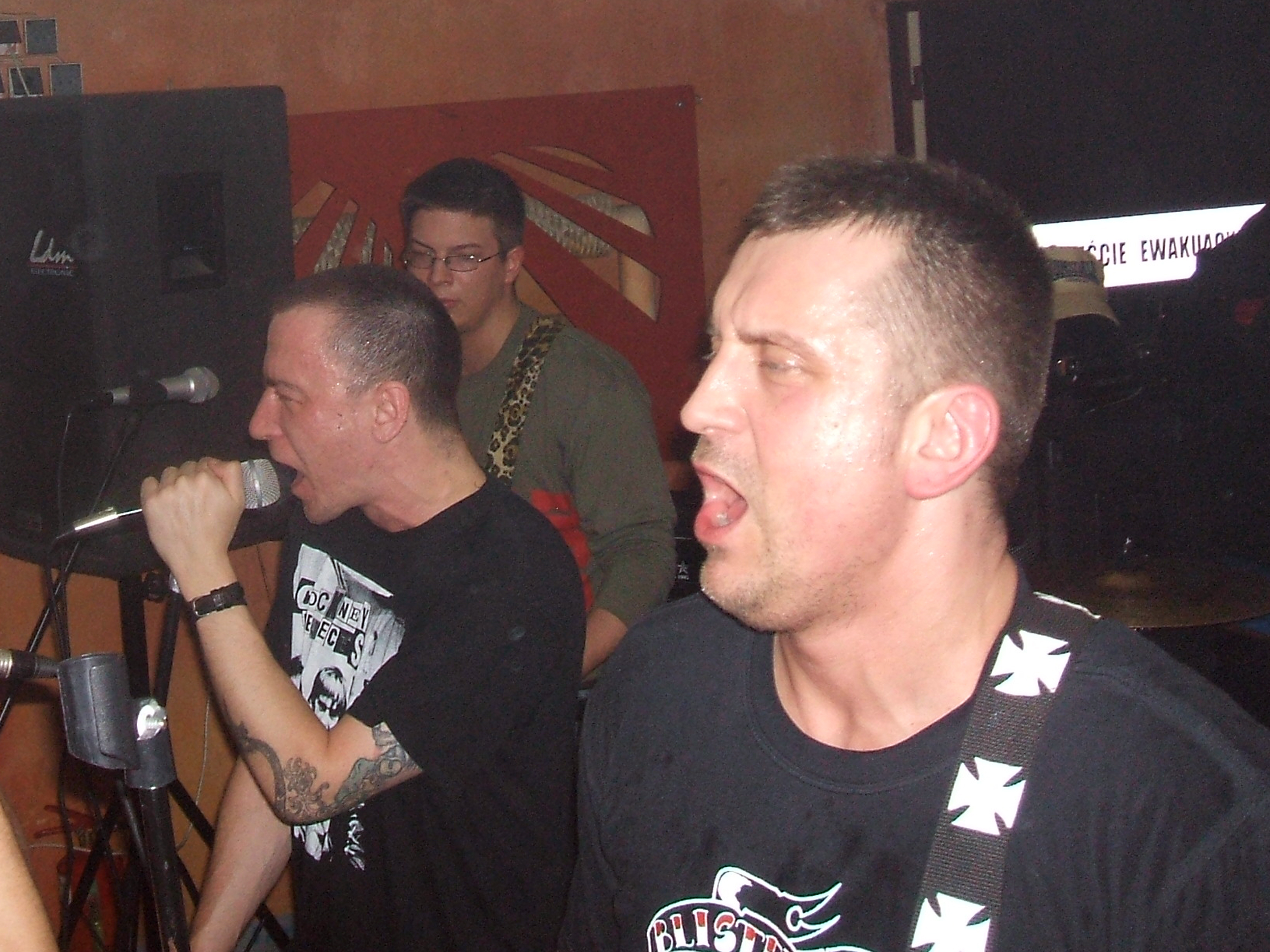
Harcerz (left) and Piguła (right) playing live for The Analogs in Tczew, March 2007

Throughout the late 1990s and early 2000s, Piguła remained on the bass when free and continued to write the band's lyrics from his cell when in prison. Harcerz was for a time replaced by Dariusz "Smalec" Tkaczyk as vocalist, only to return in 2004. These years saw a number of different guitarists play with The Analogs, namely: Grzegorz "Heniek" Król, Artur Szmit, Dariusz "Kwadrat" Stefański, Błażej Halski, Jacek Tomczak, Piotr Półtorak, and Jakub Krawczyk. Paweł "Dmuchacz" Boguszewski eventually replaced Ziemowit Pawluk on the drums.

In 1997, three songs by The Analogs (mistakenly named "Analogics" on the cover) appeared on the third volume of the Oi! It's A World Invasion compilation released by UK-based labels Bronco Bullfrog Records and Step-1. This was followed by another international feature on the third German-Italian release of KOB Vs Mad Butcher in 2001. Come autumn, they played their first concert in Prague.

During 2002, The Analogs performed again at the punk initiative of the Great Orchestra of Christmas Charity, together with Anti-Nowhere League, Los Fastidios, Skarface, and Oxymoron. In spring of the same year, The Analogs performed several times in Italy and in the summer they appeared at Antifest in the Czech Republic. Also in 2002, a song by The Analogs was featured on Class Pride World Wide 2 of Insurgence Records in Canada.

In 2003, the Italian label Havin' A Laugh Records released a song of The Analogs on Stay Punk! (An International Punk Rock Compilation). By December 2003, the band had recorded 5 albums and were invited to play at Punk & Disorderly festival in Germany. The Analogs were the only Polish artists playing at that concert, returning to perform at the same festival in 2004 and again in 2006.

The 10th anniversary of the group took place on the last weekend of April 2005 and lasted for two days. Many guest stars were invited, including: Schizma, Vespa, AEFDE, Komety, PDS, WSC, Zbeer, Wściekły Pies, Anti Dread, and many more. During summer of the same year, The Analogs took part in two large festivals, one in Germany ("Glaubitz") and the second a return to the Czech Republic for Antifest.

=== 2006–2015: More albums and European tours ===
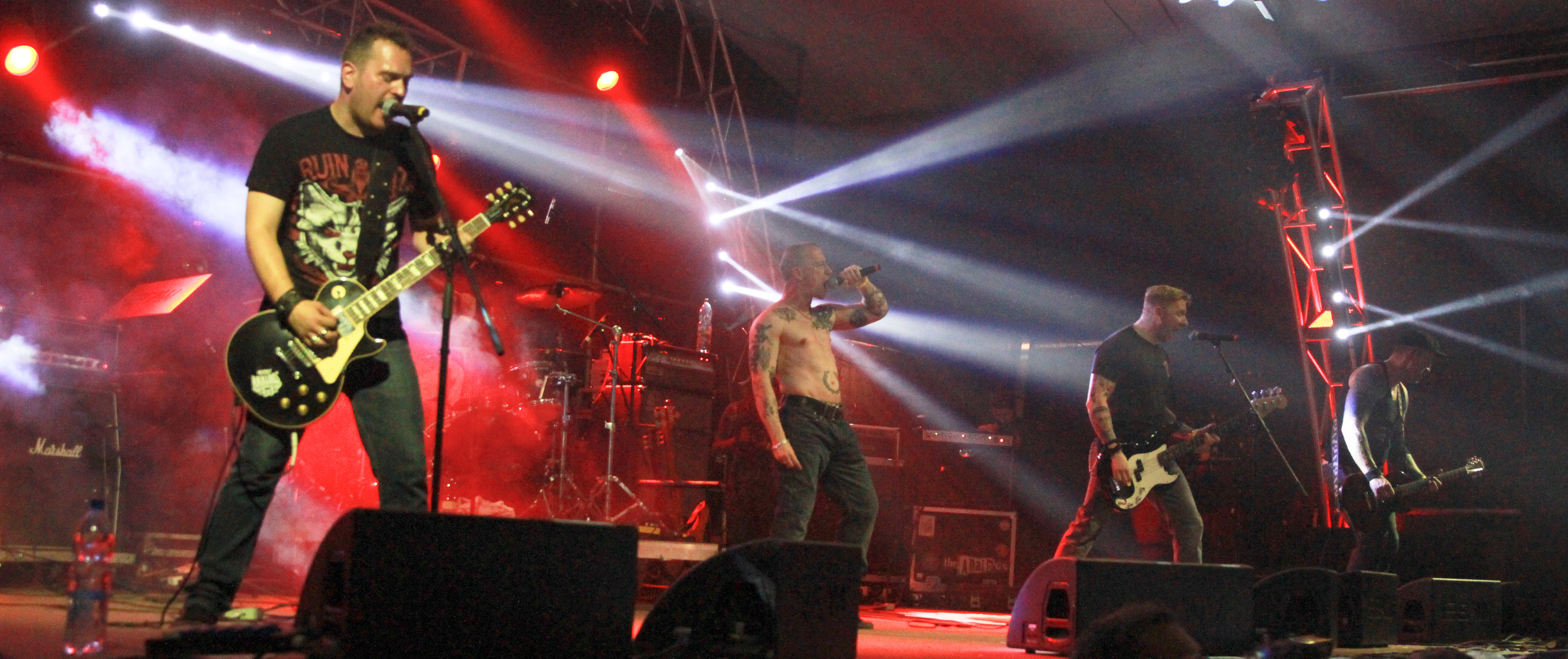
The Analogs playing at Przystanek Woodstock, July 2015

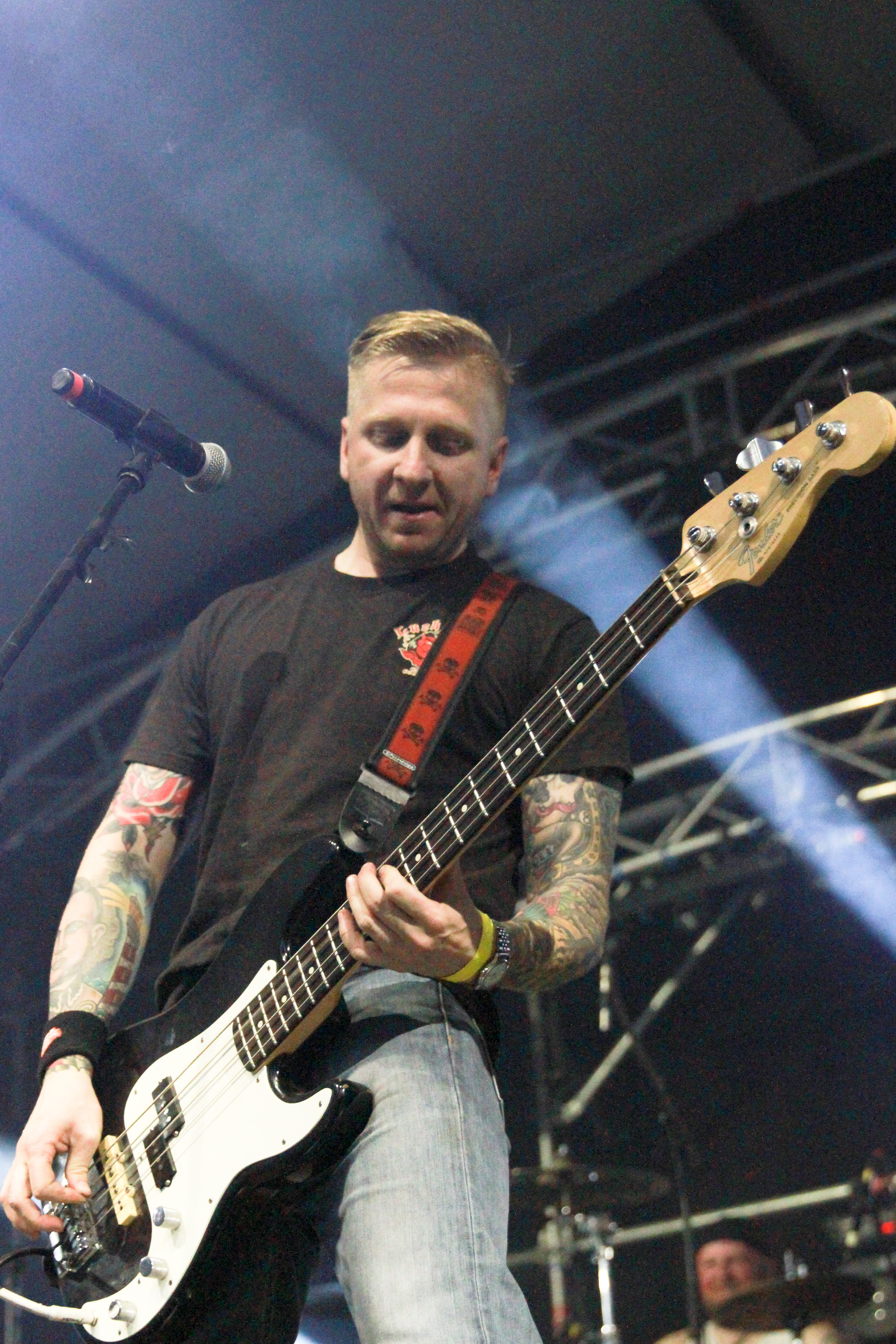
Bassist Przemysław "Benon" Kaczmarek in 2015

At the start of 2006, Dmuchacz left the band and Kacper Kosiński became the new drummer. In the same year, their cover of a Dezerter song was featured on Dezerter's tribute album Nie ma zagrożenia - jest Dezerter. By December, Piotr Półtorak had to leave The Analogs for personal reasons and was replaced by Mirosław "Miro" Lipniewski, the guitarist of Anti Dread. The Analogs continued to be active, both on the stage and in the studio, releasing an album almost every year.

The first half of 2007 brought the band to London, which was also their last concert with Kacper who left to be replaced by Sylwester "Billy" Biliński on the drums. With spring 2008 came a live performance of The Analogs in Moscow. Miro left the band as Piguła moved from bassist to guitarist, while Tomasz Majorek joined to play the bass. Kacper returned in 2009 to be the band's drummer again, replacing Billy. In October of the same year, The Analogs played in Edinburgh.

Kacper left again in 2010 to be replaced by Marcin "Juras" Grzelak on the drums. 2012 brought more releases and tours, including gigs in Oslo, Dublin, a return to London, and an important performance on the large stage at Przystanek Woodstock. In autumn of 2012, Jakub Krawczyk left and Kamil Rosiak joined to take his place as guitarist for the tour. In December, Rosiak left along with Juras and Tomasz Majorek; they were replaced by Krystian Faszczewski (guitar), Karol Faszczewski (drums), and Przemysław "Benon" Kaczmarek (bass).

The Analogs visited Moscow again in 2013. This year also marked their return to Przystanek Woodstock. Come spring 2014, Kamil Rosiak came back to replace Krystian on the guitar; Szymon "Kanister" Jędrol became the new drummer when Karol left with Krystian. In 2015, The Analogs celebrated their 20th anniversary with a tour and performed at the Rock na Bagnie festival in Goniądz.

=== 2016–present: New singer and Projekt Pudło ===
At the turn of 2015/2016, the band's longtime vocalist Dominik "Harcerz" Pyrzyna fell ill and, by autumn of 2016, was forced to stop singing due to his deteriorating health; Kamil Rosiak took on the mantle as The Analogs' new singer while continuing to play the guitar for them. During the same year, the band played at Przystanek Woodstock again.

With January 2018 came Wilk, the band's first full-length release featuring their new line-up – Rosiak on the guitar and vocals, Piguła as guitarist, Benon on the bass, and Jakub May as the drummer. In the same year, Piguła and singer Kamil Rosiak started their acoustic Projekt Pudło, which led them to perform duet versions of The Analogs songs in penitentiaries, correctional facilities, and drug addiction centres across Poland – starting in August and going on numerous other Projekt Pudło tours since then. The Analogs returned to the Goniądz Rock na Bagnie festival in 2018 and took part in the re-activated Punky Reggage Live tour in 2019. The band played around 165 concerts in 2019.

In 2020 came the 25th anniversary, followed in 2021 by yet another warmly received album (CHWDP) that carried on the band's tradition of socially aware lyrics. Although Piguła's lyrics had always dealt with themes of working class issues and life on the streets, the songs on CHDWP delved even deeper into the marginalised topics of economic exploitation, social inequalities, violence used in the name of governments, lies of politicians, and disillusionment with capitalism. Kamil Rosiak started a black metal/punk band called Dybuk during lockdowns caused by the COVID-19 pandemic in Poland, while remaining the singer and guitarist of The Analogs.

The Analogs continued to play at anti-racist and anti-nationalist events in the 2020s. Their Częstochowa live performance in February of 2024, in spite of the musicians' ages, was described as showing the same "exuberance, energy and strong emphasis on a clear message" that the band has always been known for.

== Band members ==
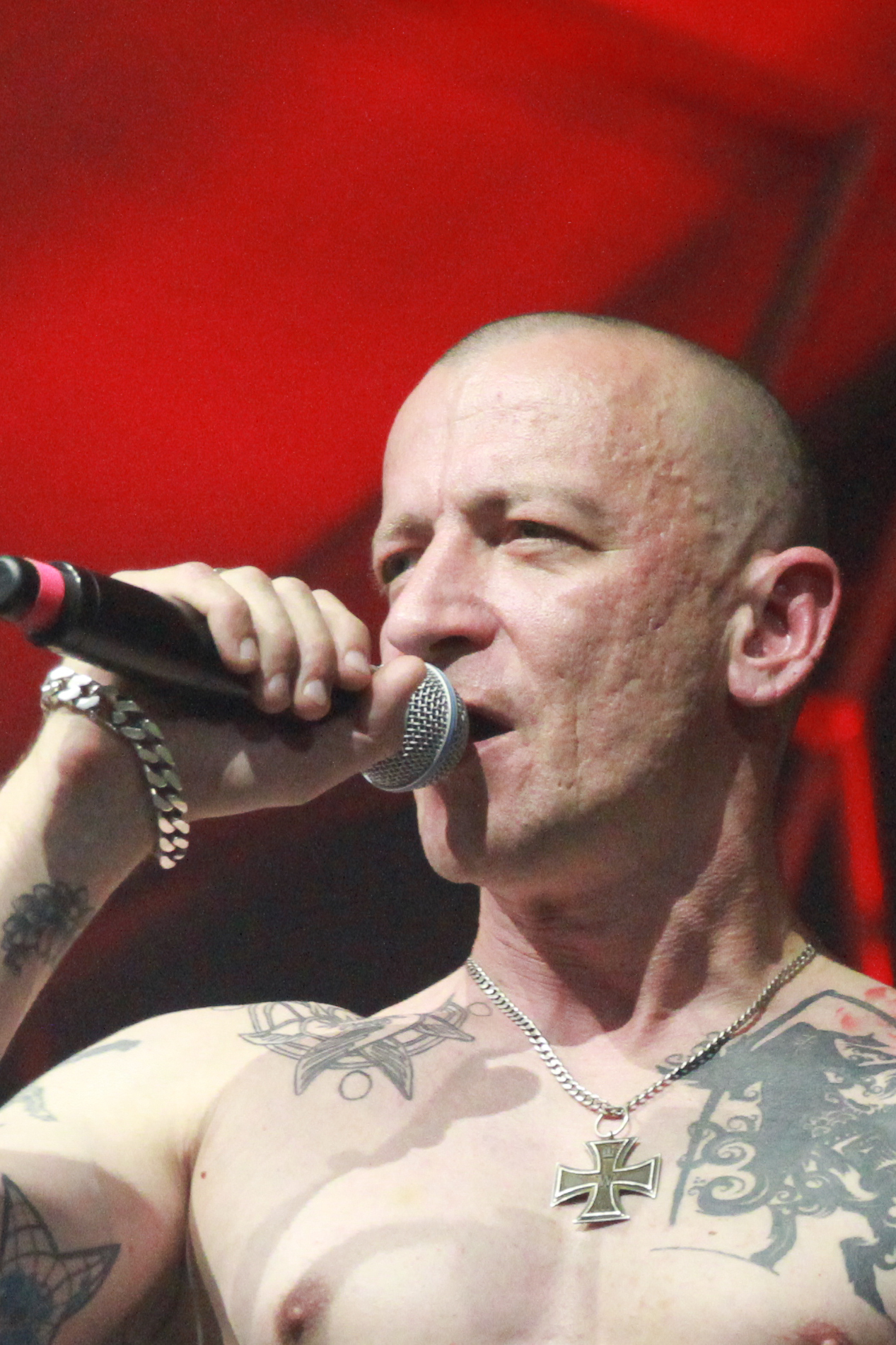
Former singer Dominik "Harcerz" Pyrzyna in 2015

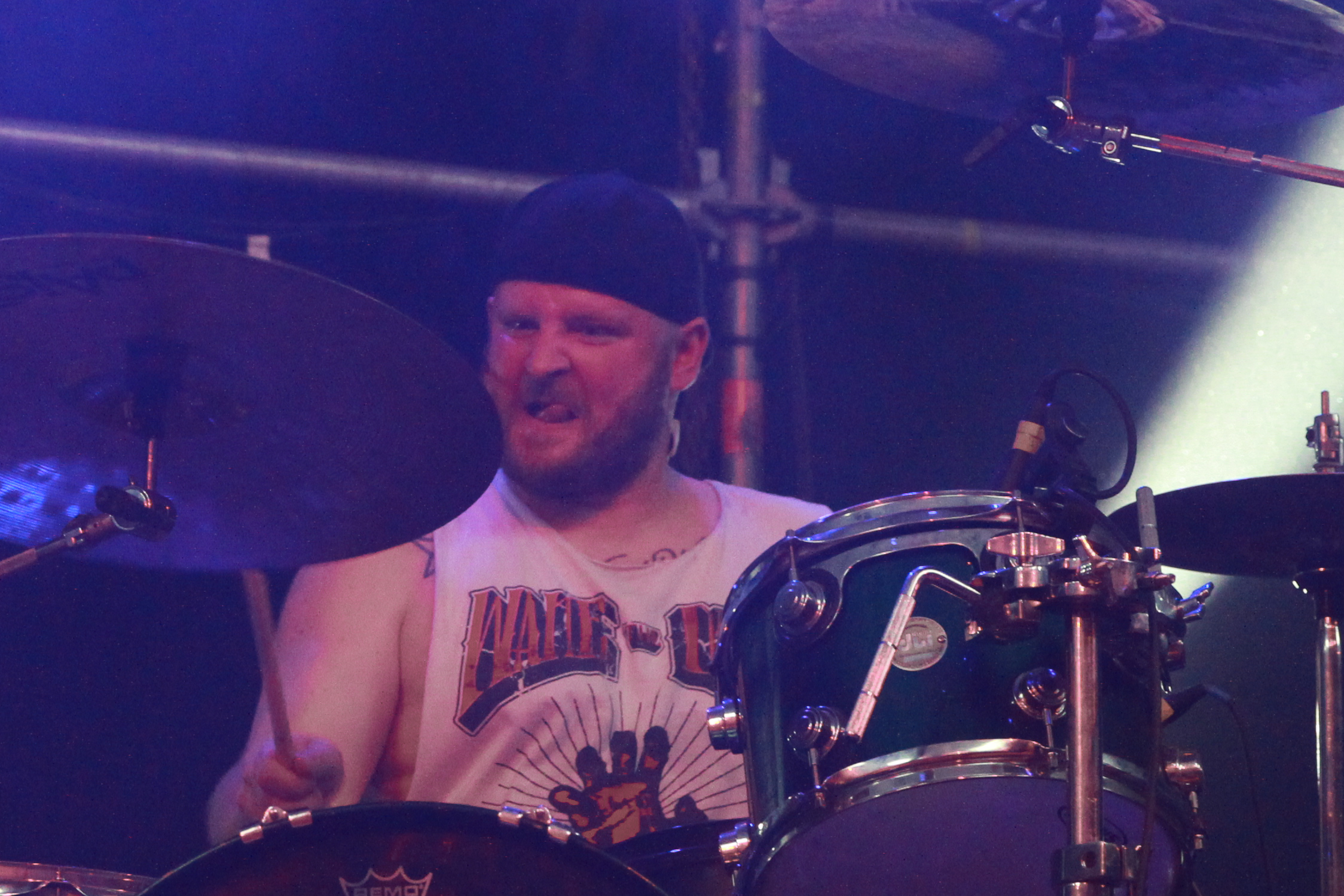
Former drummer Szymon "Kanister" Jędrol in 2015

=== Current members ===
- Paweł "Piguła" Czekała – guitar
- Kamil Rosiak – vocals, guitar
- Przemysław "Benon" Kaczmarek – bass guitar
- Max Matusewicz – drums

=== Former members ===
- Dominik "Harcerz" Pyrzyna – vocals (1996–1999, 2004–2016)
- Marek "Oreł" Adamowicz – guitar (1995–1996)
- Artur Szmit - bass guitar (1998–1999), guitar (2000-2001)
- Błażej "Komisarz" Halski – guitar (2001–2004)
- Ziemowit Pawluk – drums (1995–2003)
- Jakub May – drums (2018-2024)

== Discography ==
- Oi! Młodzież (Rock'n'roller 1996 / Jimmy Jazz Records 2001)
- Street Punk Rulez! (Rock'n'roller 1997 / Jimmy Jazz Records 2001)
- Hlaskover Rock (Rock'n'roller 1999 / Jimmy Jazz Records 2001)
- Oi! Młodzież/Mechaniczna Pomarańcza (Rock'n'roller 2000 / Jimmy Jazz Records 2001)
- Blask Szminki (Jimmy Jazz Records 2001)
- Trucizna (Jimmy Jazz Records 2003)
- Kroniki Policyjne (Jimmy Jazz Records 2004)
- Talent Zero (Jimmy Jazz Records 2005)
- Poza prawem (Jimmy Jazz Records 2006)
- Najlepsze z najgorszych (Jimmy Jazz Records 2007)
- Miejskie Opowieści (Jimmy Jazz Records 2008)
- Taniec cieni (Jimmy Jazz Records 2010)
- Sos Sos Sos (Street Influence 2011)
- XIII. Ballady czasu upadku - Live in Graffiti (Lou & Rocked Boys 2012)
- Pełnoletnia Oi! Młodzież (Lou & Rocked Boys 2013)
- Na serca mego dnie (Oldschool Records 2013)
- Bezpieczny Port (Lou & Rocked Boys 2014)
- Ostatnia Kołysanka (Oldschool Records 2015)
- 30/20 (Lou & Rocked Boys 2017)
- Wilk (Lou & Rocked Boys 2018)
- Projekt Pudło (Oldschool Records 2019)
- CHWDP (Oldschool Records 2021)
- Bestia (Oldschool Records 2024)

== Notes ==
1. After leaving the band, Marek became a drum and bass DJ. The Analogs song called "Marek" is a tribute to him.
2. Released as a vinyl LP in 2005 and 2 years after as a CD + DVD. Compilation of bands all time hits, recorded on a special studio session, prepared for the 10th anniversary.
3. Iwan died a few years later in an accident in London (riding a scooter). The Analogs song titled Iwan is a tribute to their longtime friend.
4. First released as a MC, later released as a split with Ramzes & the Hooligans, finally re-released as its own album several times on CD and vinyl.

== See also ==
- The Hunkies - hardcore punk project of some of The Analogs members
