= Hlaskover Rock =

Studio album by The Analogs
- Released: 1999
- Recorded: 1998–1999
- Genre: Punk rock
- Label: Rock'n'roller

The Analogs chronology
| Street Punk Rulez! (1997) | Hlaskover Rock (1999) | Oi! Młodzież/Mechaniczna Pomarańcza (2000) |

Hlaskover Rock is the third album by Polish punk rock band The Analogs.

== Track listing ==
Titles in parentheses are translations from Polish.

1. "Iwan" ("Ivan")
2. "Ukrzyżowani" ("Crucified", Iron Cross cover)
3. "Idole" ("Idols")
4. "Nie Chcą Zamieszek" ("They Don't Wanna Riot")
5. "Max Schmeling" (reference to the boxer Max Schmeling)
6. "Niemy Krzyk" ("Silent Shout")
7. "Dlatego, że" ("Because...")
8. "Era Techno" ("Techno Era")
9. "Dzieciaki Ulicy" ("Kids of the Street")
10. "Dzieciaki Atakujące Policję 2" ("Kids Attacking Cops 2")
11. "Dziewczyny z Brudnych Miast" ("East End Girl", Cock Sparrer cover)
12. "Football"
13. "Hlaskover Rock"

=== Bonus tracks ===
1. "Dzieciaki Atakujące Policję" ("Kids Attacking Cops")
2. "Te Chłopaki" ("Those Boys")
3. "Sprzedana" ("Sold")
4. "Cena za Życie" ("A Price for Life")
5. "Historia" ("The History")
