= Dystans =

Studio album by Eye for an Eye
- Released: 2004
- Recorded: 2004
- Genre: Punk rock Hardcore
- Length: ???
- Label: Pasażer
- Producer: Maciej Mularczyk

Eye for an Eye chronology
Fabryka Drwin (2000)	Dystans (2004)	To co nas łączy (2005)

Second album of Polish hardcore punk rock band Eye for an Eye

== Track listing ==
1. "Otwórz drzwi" – 1:13
2. "Warriors" – 2:08
3. "Krzyczymy" – 1:39
4. "Klatka" – 2:06
5. "Konflikt" – 1:53
6. "W tłumie" – 1:53
7. "Śmiech" – 1:37
8. "Dżuma" – 1:43
9. "Why not?" – 2:15
10. "Dojrzałość" – 1:16
11. "Silikonowy świat" – 1:54
12. "W igle" – 2:18
13. "Kryminał" – 1:41
14. "Budzik" – 2:15

== Personnel ==
- Anka - vocals
- Tomek - guitar, vocals
- Bartek - guitar, vocals
- Damian - bass guitar, vocals
- Rafał - drums

== Resources ==
Band's official site
