= List of punk rock festivals =

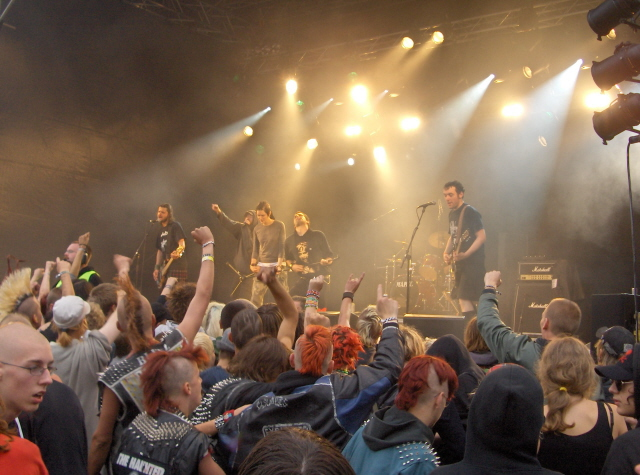
- Related genres: Punk rock, hardcore punk, rock
- Location: Worldwide
- Related events: Music festival, concert tour, rock festival, heavy metal festival, gothic festival
- Other: Punk subculture

The following is an incomplete list of punk rock music festivals. This list may have some overlap with list of rock festivals and list of heavy metal festivals. Punk is a rock music genre that developed between 1974 and 1976 in the United States, United Kingdom, and Australia. Rooted in garage rock and other forms of what is now known as protopunk music, punk rock bands eschewed perceived excesses of mainstream 1970s rock. By 1976 the first festivals were being organized.

== Festivals ==
Name	Year	Location	Notes
European Punk Rock Festival	1976	Mont de Marsan, France	This self-described "First European Punk Rock Festival" was held in Mont de Marsan in the southwest of France on 21 August 1976. The festival was organized by Marc Zermati and featured French bands: Bijou, Il Biaritz, Shakin’ Street, The Damned. and was headlined by Eddie and the Hot Rods, a London pub rock group. The Sex Pistols were also scheduled to play but were dropped by the promoter, claiming the band held excessive demands regarding top billing and certain amenities that were deemed “too much.” The Clash were also billed but backed out in solidarity. The only band from the new punk movement to appear was The Damned.
100 Club Punk Festival	1976	London, United Kingdom	A two-days event held at the 100 Club —a typically jazz-oriented venue in Oxford Street, London, England- on 20 and 21 September 1976. The gig showcased eight punk bands, most of which were unsigned. Each performing bands were associated with the evolving punk rock music scene and movement of the UK. The festival is viewed as a watershed event for the movement, as punk began to move from the underground and emerge into the mainstream music scene.
Deeply Vale Festivals	1976–1979	England, United Kingdom	The Deeply Vale Festivals were a unique series of free festivals held near Bury in northwest England in 1976, 1977, 1978, and 1979. They are regarded as significant events that united punk music into a festival scene.
Rock Against Racism	1976–1982	United Kingdom	
Rock Against Sexism	1978–	United Kingdom	
Futurama Festival	1979-1989 2022-	Netherlands, United Kingdom	
Heatwave	1980	Canada	Promoted as the Punk Woodstock
International Pop Underground Convention	1991	Olympia, WA United States	Punk and indie festival associated with the start of the riot grrrl movement.
Groezrock	1992–2017	Meerhout, Belgium	Groezrock was an annual music festival that took place in Meerhout, Belgium. It started as a small rock and pop festival with one stage with a few hundred people attending but evolved into a large punk rock/hardcore punk festival gathering attendances exceeding 30,000.
Ieperfest	1993–present	Ypres, Belgium	Hardcore punk festival
Yoyo A Go Go	1994–2001	Olympia, WA United States	Held in 1994, 1997, 1999, and 2001
Vans Warped Tour	1995–2019; 2025	United States	A touring summer festival was held in venues such as parking lots or fields upon which stages and other structures were assembled for the duration of the event and then moved to the next location. It began as a showcase of extreme sports with alternative and punk rock music and later progressed into more diverse music genres over the years. It was the longest-running touring music festival in North America. The tour featured some stops in Canada and for a time, Australia and Europe.
Antifest	1995–present	Svojšice, Czech Republic	
Rebellion Festival	1996–present	Blackpool, United Kingdom	Main hub of the UK punk scene in the 21st century. 300 bands over four days in August at the Blackpool Winter Gardens. Formerly ‘Holidays in the Sun’ and the ‘Wasted Festival’, it was held nearby Morecambe for part of its first decade. The festival took a permanent place in Blackpool and is held each autumn. Some overseas spinoff festivals have also been held.
Deconstruction Tour	1999–present	Europe	Touring festival featuring punk rock bands and skating
New England Metal and Hardcore Festival	1999–2018, 2023–present	Worcester, MA United States	
Punk Rock Bowling Music Festival	1999-present	Las Vegas, NV United States	3-Days outdoor music festival held in downtown Las Vegas with additional late-night club performances held in multiple venues, live music pool parties, bowling tournament, and other side events
Fluff Fest	2000–present	Rokycany, Czech Republic	Independent vegan hardcore punk festival, significant for European DIY punk
Furnace Fest	2000–present	Birmingham, AL United States	
The Fest	2002–present	Gainesville, FL United States	A three-day punk music festival taking over a large amount of the Gainesville, Florida downtown bar and outdoor event spaces that are almost completely operated by volunteer contribution.
PunkFest @ 'The Cockpit', Leeds	2002, 2004 and 2005	Leeds, United Kingdom	Three of a set of similar gigs and large one-day shows that took place between 2000 and 2006. The lengthy article - 'The Final Chapter' featured on the linked website is a summary of the experience of the promoter of these shows and contains a number of previously unavailable archive materials
Drop Dead Festival	2003–2012	United States and Europe	An electro, post-punk, synthpunk, and experimental multi-day festival and the largest DIY festival for "art-damaged" music
Common Ground Festival	2004–present	Forest of Dean, England, United Kingdom	Originally known as Dirty Weekend Festival, Common Ground is a not-for-profit punk rock fundraiser featuring mostly independent anarcho-punk and hardcore punk bands and supporting political activism.
Nice 'N Sleazy / Sleazy Live	2004–present	Morecambe, United Kingdom	Began as offshoot for Rebellion (then Wasted) - campsite with own unofficial stage. Became a separate festival in its own right when Wasted reverted to Blackpool in 2006 Renamed as Sleazy Live from 2025 onwards.
Mighty Sounds	2005–present	Tábor, Czech Republic	Focused on punk rock and hardcore punk but also ska and reggae
Riot Fest	2005–present	Chicago, IL United States	
Persistence Tour	2005–present	Europe	Hardcore punk tour
Insubordination Fest	2006–2013	Maryland, United States	
Sound and Fury Festival	2006–present	Los Angeles, CA United States	
Estonian Punk Song Festival	2008–present	Estonia	
Another Winter Of Discontent (AWOD)	2010–2017	Tufnell Park/Derby, UK	Main event held at Boston Arms, secondary room of Tuffnell Park Dome - Northern offshoot AWOD North held in Derby.
PouzzaFest	2011—present	Montreal, Canada	Three-day festival in mid-May, taking place in several venues in downtown Montreal.
Outbreak Festival	2011—present	Manchester, United Kingdom	
Undercover Festival	2012–present	Bilston/Brighton/Guildford/Margate/Tufnell Park/Woking, United Kingdom	
Break the Ice	2012–2014	Melbourne, Australia	This event emerged from a 2012 show by Trapped Under Ice into a 2-day hardcore punk festival held in 2013 and 2014
Foreign Dissent	2014—present	Orlando, FL United States	Annual festival featuring exclusively foreign bands (non-US) in Orlando, Florida.
Off Limits	2017–present	Mexico City, Mexico	Annual independent hardcore punk festival organised by Puercords Records, which features Mexican and international bands. Past editions included bands such as Sick Of It All, Ignite, 88 Fingers Louie, Powertrip, Suicidal Tendencies, Wolfbrigade and more.
Pop Punk Pile-Up	2018	Selby, United Kingdom	New alternative punk rock festival launching in the UK in 2018 featuring acts such as Mallory Knox, The Bottom Line, Room 94 and The King Blues as well as many upcoming acts.
Sad Summer Fest	2019 - Present	United States	Widely considered to be the successor of the Vans Warped Tour.
fForest Fest	2022	Morris, IL United States	Punk Rock Music Festival with 200 vendors

== Gallery ==
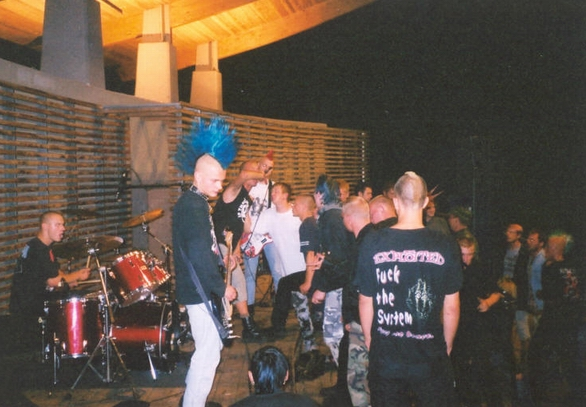

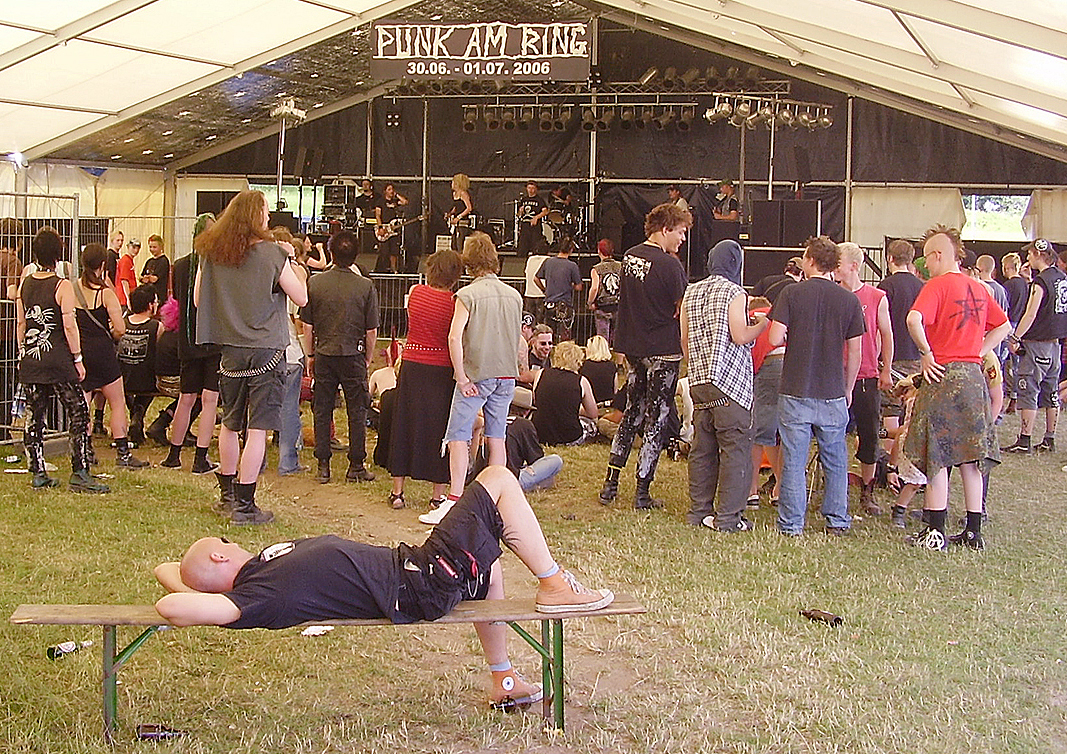

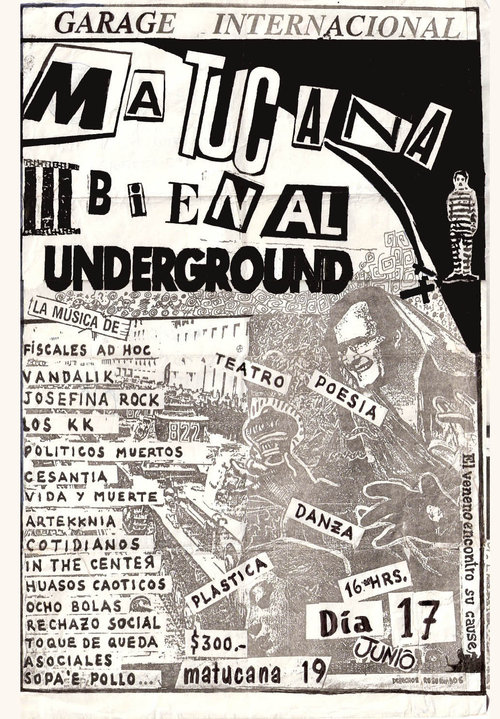

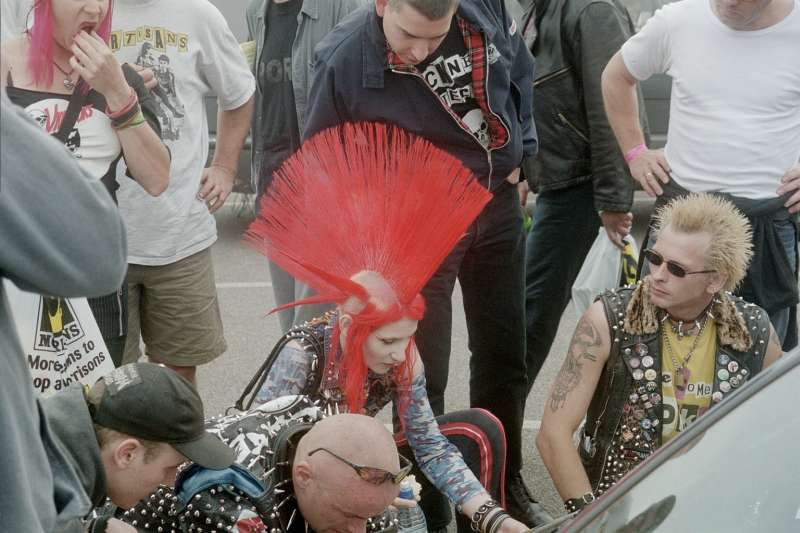

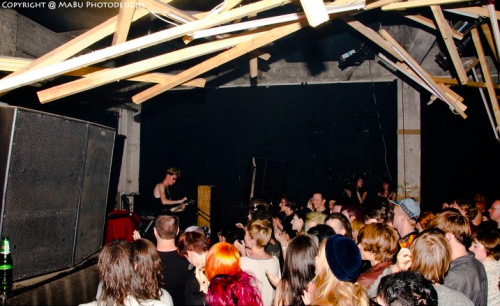

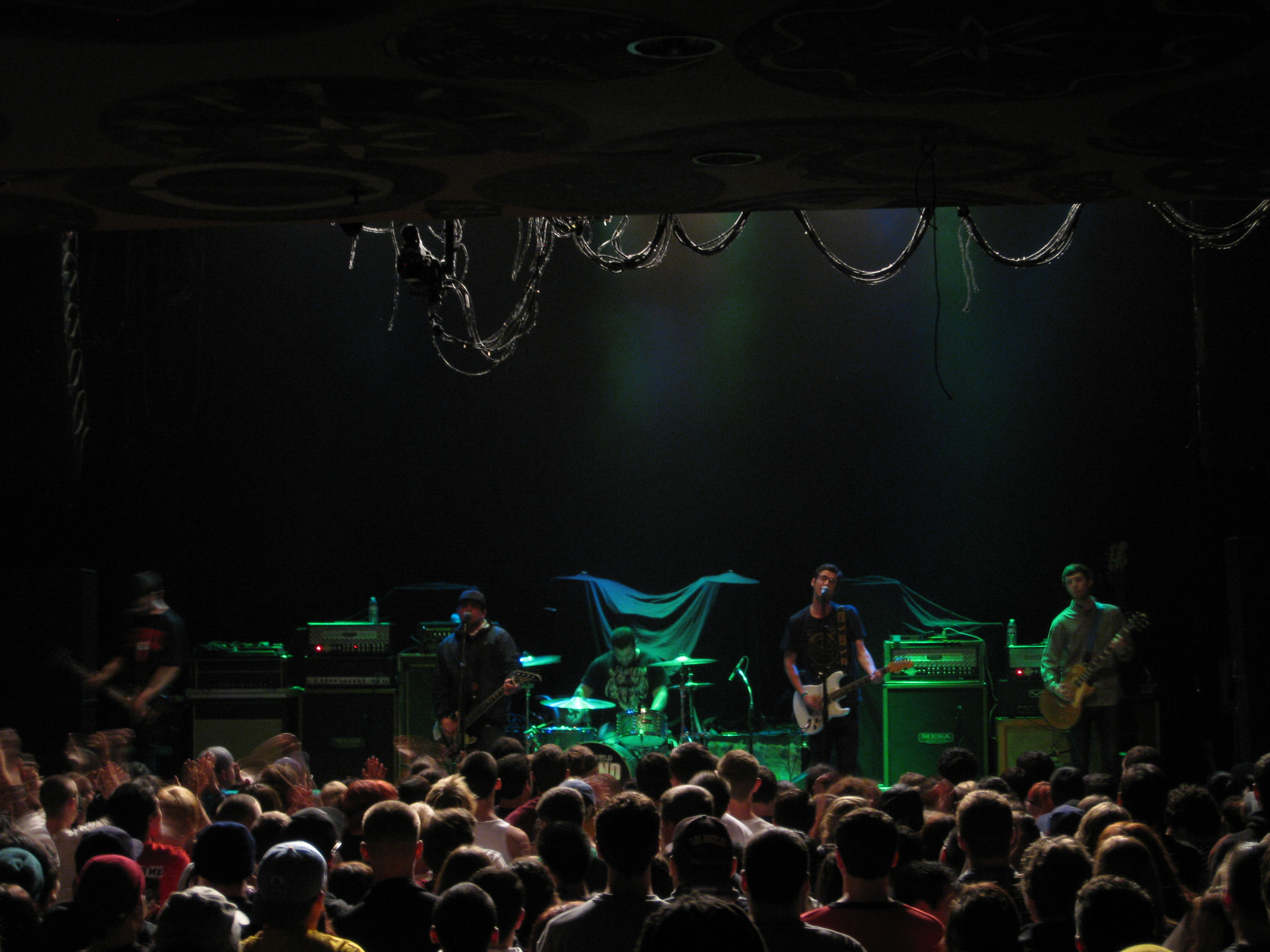

== See also ==
- Punk rock
- List of music festivals
- List of gothic festivals
