= Oi! Młodzież/Mechaniczna Pomarańcza =

Studio album (split) by The Analogs and Ramzes & the Hooligans
- Released: 2000
- Recorded: 1995–1996
- Genre: Streetpunk
- Label: Rock'n'roller
- Producer: Zdzisław Jodko

The Analogs chronology
Hlaskover Rock (1999)	Oi! Młodzież/Mechaniczna Pomarańcza (2000)	Blask Szminki (2001)

Oi! Młodzież/Mechaniczna Pomarańcza is a split CD of Polish streetpunk bands, The Analogs and Ramzes & the Hooligans.

== Track listing ==
Titles in brackets are translated from Polish.

=== The Analogs tracks ===
1. "Nasze Ciała (Our Bodies)
2. "Oi! Młodzież" (Oi! Youth)
3. "Popatrz Na... Cena za Życie" (Look at... A Price for Life)
4. "Szczecin"
5. "Te Chłopaki" (Those Boys)
6. "Ulica" (Street)
7. "He He He" (Cock Sparrer cover)
8. "Tygrys" (The Tiger)
9. "Analogs Rules"
10. "Jednoczcie się i Zwyciężajcie" (Unite and Win)
11. "Strzelby z Brixton" (The Clash cover) (Guns of Brixton)
12. "Dzieciaki Atakujące Policję" (Kids Attacking Cops)
13. "Cud" (A Miracle)
14. "Kupa" (Shit)

=== Ramzes & The Hooligans tracks ===
1. "Intro"
2. "Mechaniczna Pomarańcza" (Clockwork Orange)
3. "My Młodzież" (We, the Youth)
4. "Walka Klas" (Class War)
5. "Strach" (Fear)
6. "Punk Rock"
7. "Nie Ma Zmiłuj Się" (No Mercy)
8. "Kontrola" (Rejestracja cover) (Control)
9. "Kiosk" (Kiosk)
10. "Oi! Bootboy"
11. "Ramzes"
12. "Samobójstwo" (Suicide)
13. "Naprzód 23" (Carry On 23)
14. "Grube Świnie" (Fat Pigs)
15. "Ja Wiem" (I Know)
16. "Wielkanoc" (Easter)
17. "Autovidol"
18. "Nick Cruz"
