= Karcer =

Polish punk rock band

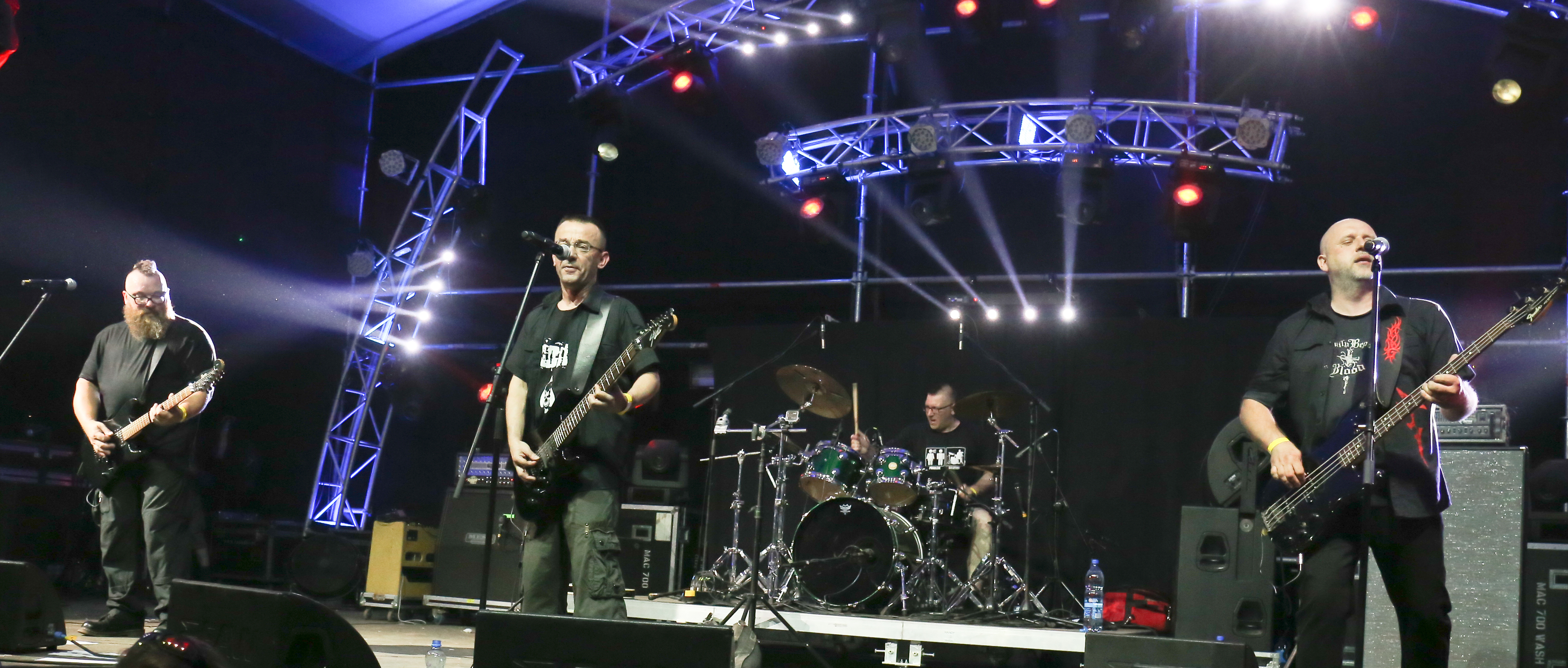
- Przystanek Woodstock 2016

Background information
- Origin: Poland
- Genres: Punk rock
- Years active: 1982–present
- Labels: Arston; Rock'n'roller; Jimmy Jazz Records
- Members: Krzysztof Żeromski; Adam Leo; Daniel Łukasik

Karcer is a Polish punk rock band playing since 1982.

== Members ==
=== 1982 ===
- Krzysztof Żeromski - guitar, vocals
- Piotr Dudziński
- Jarosław Jodłowski

=== 1984 ===
- Krzysztof Żeromski - guitar, vocals
- Dariusz Lewandowski - vocals
- Dariusz Elwert - bass guitar
- Wojciech Soboń - drums

=== 1988 ===
- Krzysztof Żeromski - guitar, vocals
- Dariusz Elwert - bass guitar
- Paweł Wirkus - drums

=== 1990 ===
- Krzysztof Żeromski - guitar, vocals
- Przemysław Brosz - guitar
- Adam Lao - bass guitar
- Tomasz Fangrat - drums

=== 2002 ===
- Krzysztof Żeromski - guitar, vocals
- Adam Lao - bass guitar
- Daniel Łukasik - drums

== Discography ==
- Karcer - 1987
- Karcer - 1988
- Turning to dust - 1990
- Blindman - 1991
- Karcer - 1991
- Wschód jest pełen słońca - 1997
- Nic nikomu o niczym - 2002
- Anarchiva - 2007
- Wariaci i geniusze - 2011

== History ==
The band was founded in autumn 1982 in Słupsk. Its first live appearance took place on January 8, 1983, on elimination for youth festival. The band failed to advance to this festival due to problems with censorship.

In 1985, Karcer appeared on Jarocin Festival, and managed to play on the main stage. The same year, due to success at Jarocin, the band appeared on few other festivals. One year later in Jarocin, Karcer achieved position in top ten bands.

In 1991, the band realised its first record in Gdynia. The day after the recording Karcer left the country to play a tour in Switzerland.

After three years of concerting in London pubs, Wschód jest pełen słońca was released. The record was quite popular among Polish punk fans, and in 2002 it was re-released. In 2002, the album, Nic nikomu o niczym was released.
