= Fabryka Drwin =

Studio album by Eye for an Eye
- Released: 2002
- Recorded: 2002
- Genre: Punk rock Hardcore
- Label: Eye for an Eye

Eye for an Eye chronology
Fabryka Drwin (2002)	Dystans (2004)

First album of Polish hardcore punk rock band Eye for an Eye

== Track listing ==
1. "Labirynt"
2. "Konstrukcja prawa"
3. "Uciekać"
4. "Niech opowiedzą"
5. "Wspomnienia"
6. "Wiemy"
7. "Na pewno"
8. "Betonowy świat"
9. "S.I.K."
10. "Outro"

== Personnel ==
- Anka - Vocals
- Tomek - Guitar, Vocals
- Bartek - Guitar, Vocals
- Damian - Bass, Vocals
- Rafał - Drums

== Resources ==
Band's official site
