= The Hunkies =

Polish hardcore band

- Origin: Poland
- Genres: Punk rock, Hardcore
- Years active: 2003–present
- Labels: Jimmy Jazz Records
- Members: Paweł Czekała; Nemeczek; Paweł Boguszewski; Palestyna; Piotr Skotnicki

The Hunkies are a Polish hardcore band founded in 2003. Some of the members are also playing in The Analogs band.

== Members ==
- Paweł Czekała ("Piguła") - bass guitar
- Paweł Boguszewski ("Dmuchacz") - drums
- Piotr Skotnicki ("Skoda") - guitar
- "Mały Piotruś" - guitar
- "Nemeczek" - vocals

== Discography ==
- Sprawiedliwość, 2003
- To co nas łączy, 2004

== Notes ==
1. Split CD with fellow Polish punk band Eye For An Eye.
