= Svojšice (Pardubice District) =

- Municipality
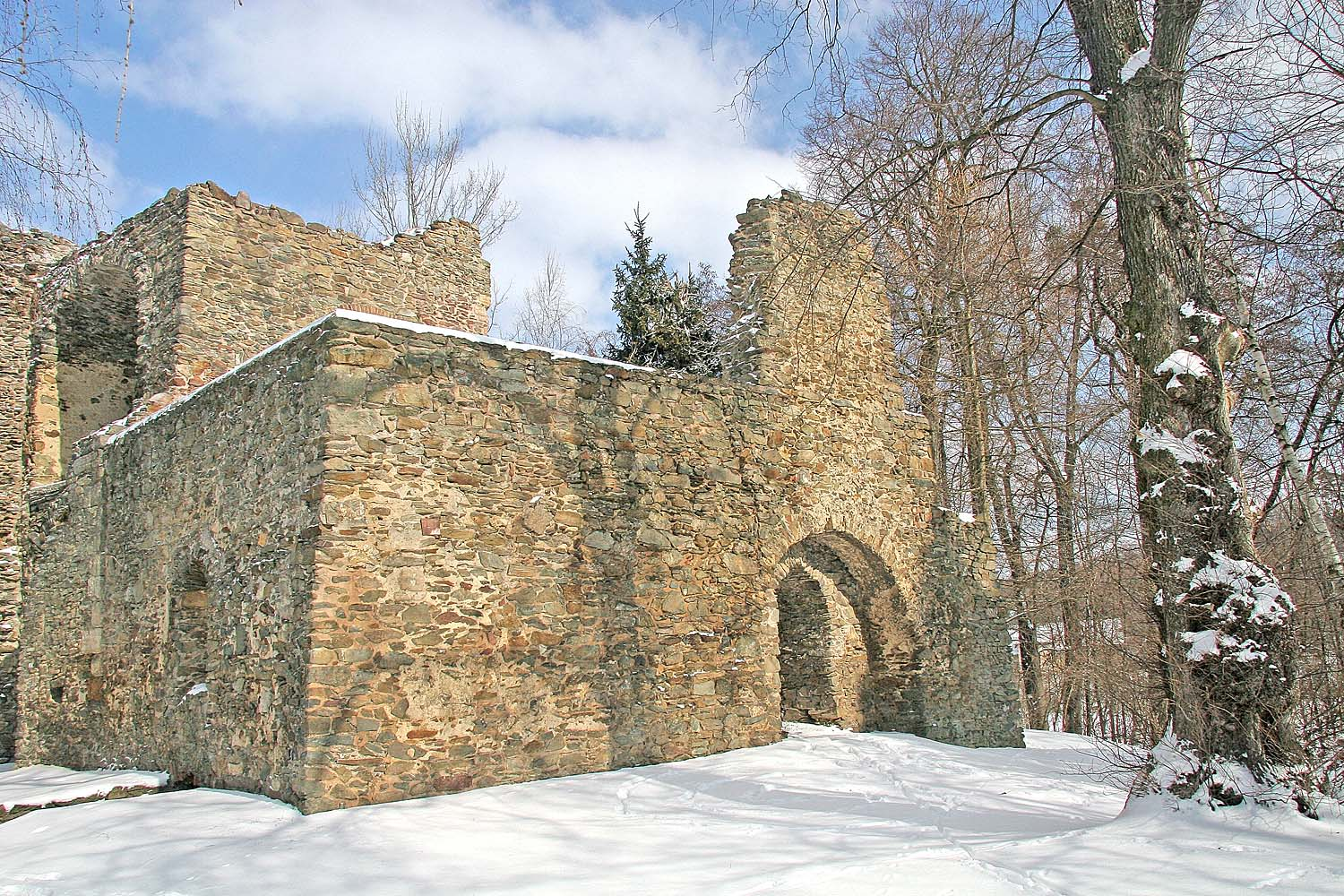
- Ruin of the Svojšice Fort

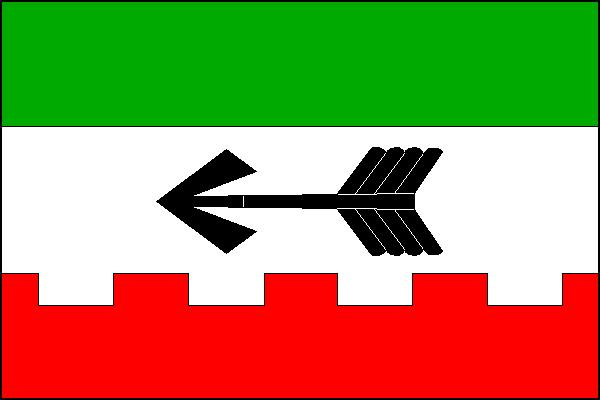
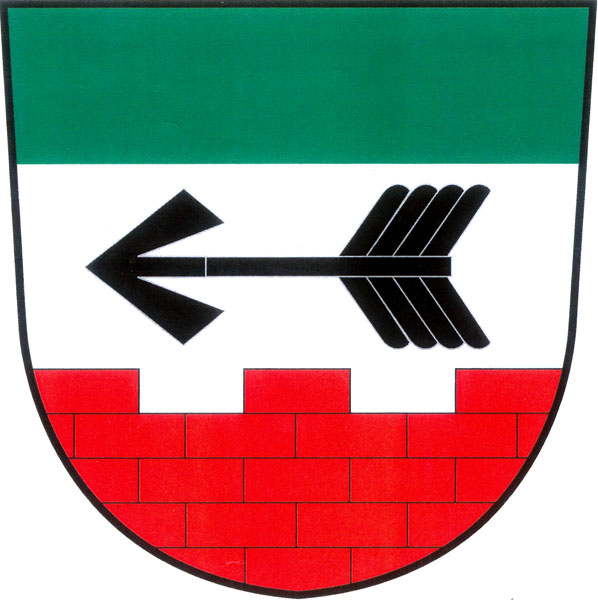
- Flag Coat of arms

- Location in the Czech Republic
- Coordinates: 49°57′55″N 15°36′4″E
- Country: Czech Republic
- Region: Pardubice
- District: Pardubice
- First mentioned: 1365

Area
  - Total: 1.94 km^{2} (0.75 sq mi)
- Elevation: 290 m (950 ft)

Population (2026-01-01)
  - Total: 283
  - Density: 146/km^{2} (378/sq mi)
- Time zone: UTC+1 (CET)
  - Summer (DST): UTC+2 (CEST)
- Postal code: 533 62
- Website: obecsvojsice.cz

Svojšice is a municipality and village in Pardubice District in the Pardubice Region of the Czech Republic. It has about 300 inhabitants.

== Demographics ==
Historical population
Year	Pop.	±%
1869	372	—
1880	389	+4.6%
1890	419	+7.7%
1900	379	−9.5%
1910	391	+3.2%
1921	384	−1.8%
1930	360	−6.2%
1950	249	−30.8%
1961	247	−0.8%
1970	235	−4.9%
1980	229	−2.6%
1991	197	−14.0%
2001	194	−1.5%
2011	246	+26.8%
2021	276	+12.2%
Source: Censuses

== Culture ==
Until 2007, Svojšice hosted the Antifest punk rock festival.
