= Rock na Bagnie =

Rock festival in Poland

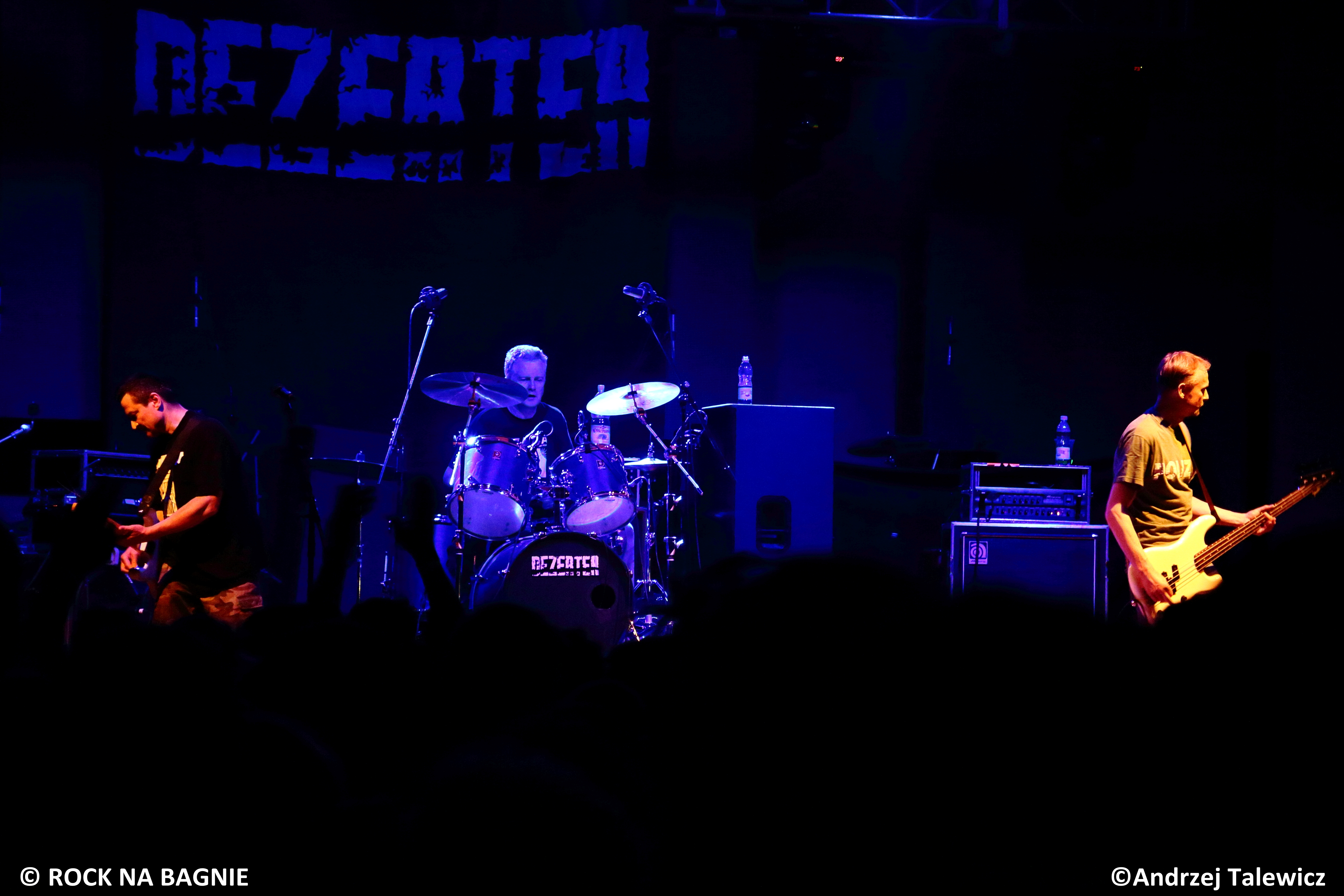
- Dezerter at Rock na Bagnie festival in 2014
- Genre: Rock, Punk
- Begins: since 2010
- Locations: Goniądz, Podlaskie, Poland
- Founders: Fundacja na rzecz Rozwoju Powiatu Monieckiego
- Website: http://www.rocknabagnie.pl

Rock na Bagnie is a rock music festival held in the Podlaskie Voivodeship of Poland since 2010. The first two editions took place in Strękowa Góra. Since 2013, following a one-year hiatus, the festival has been held in Goniądz.

Between 2010 and 2023, Rock na Bagnie hosted nearly 300 bands from both Poland and abroad. Notable performers include classic English punk rock bands such as Peter and the Test Tube Babies, UK Subs, Cockney Rejects, and G.B.H.
