= Antifest =

Former Czech music festival

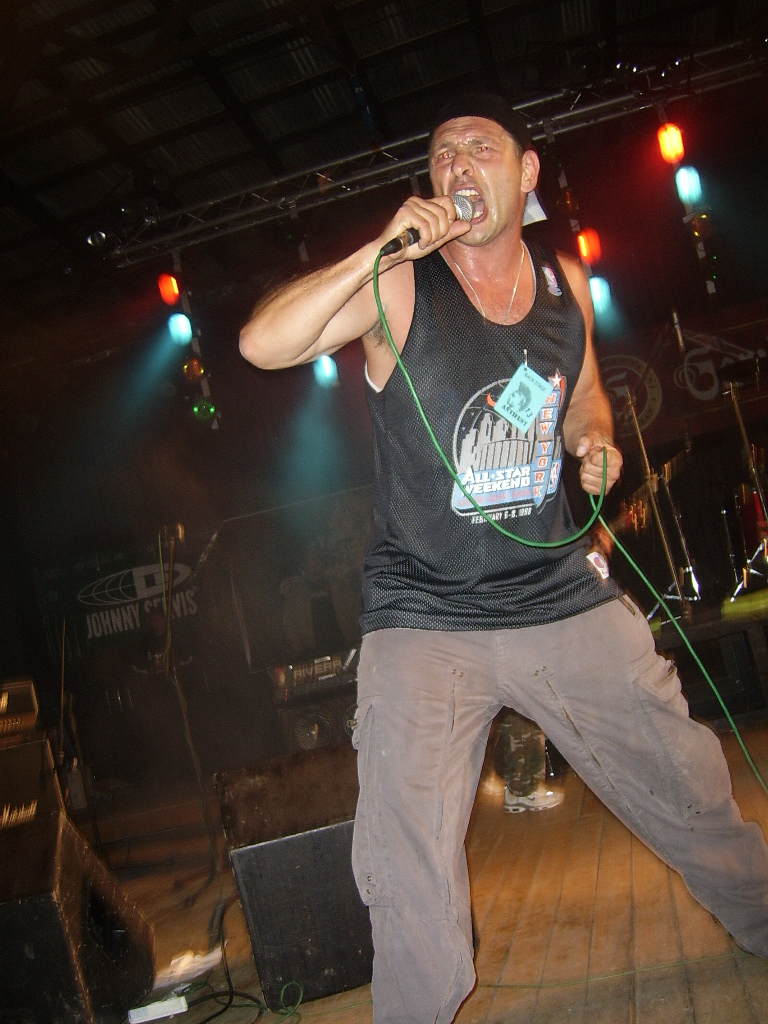
- Genre: Punk rock
- Locations: Svojšice, Czech Republic
- Years active: 1995–2007
- Website: www.antifest.eu

Antifest was a punk rock festival taking place in Svojšice in the Czech Republic.

== History ==
Antifest was organised in the middle of summer, and the first one took place in 1995. In the beginning the full title was Anti-society Fest, but later Antifest came in common use. Beside punk rock bands a significant number of ska, psychobilly and rockabilly bands appeared during the fest.

Major European bands were appearing during the festival, performing on two stages. Visitors also came from different parts of Europe, mainly from the Czech Republic, Germany and Poland.

2005 edition (11th) was the first one to last for three days, previously the festival took two days. This event was organised by Agency 92. The last edition took place in 2007. An unofficial edition (Tribute to Antifest) took place in 2020.

== See also ==
- List of punk rock festivals
- List of historic rock festivals
