= Marek Adamowicz =

Polish guitarist

Marek Adamowicz, also known as Oreł, is a former guitar player of Polish street punk band The Analogs.

== Background ==
He played for The Analogs from 1995 to 1996. In early 1995 three members of the ska band met in a rehearsal hall in Szczecin to work on songs to be performed in traditional punk rock style. He had been playing in ska band Dr. Cycos together with other The Analogs members: Ziemowit Pawluk and Paweł Czekała. After leaving The Analogs Marek started a career as a DJ (Electric Rudeboyz).
