= Symarip =

British ska and reggae band

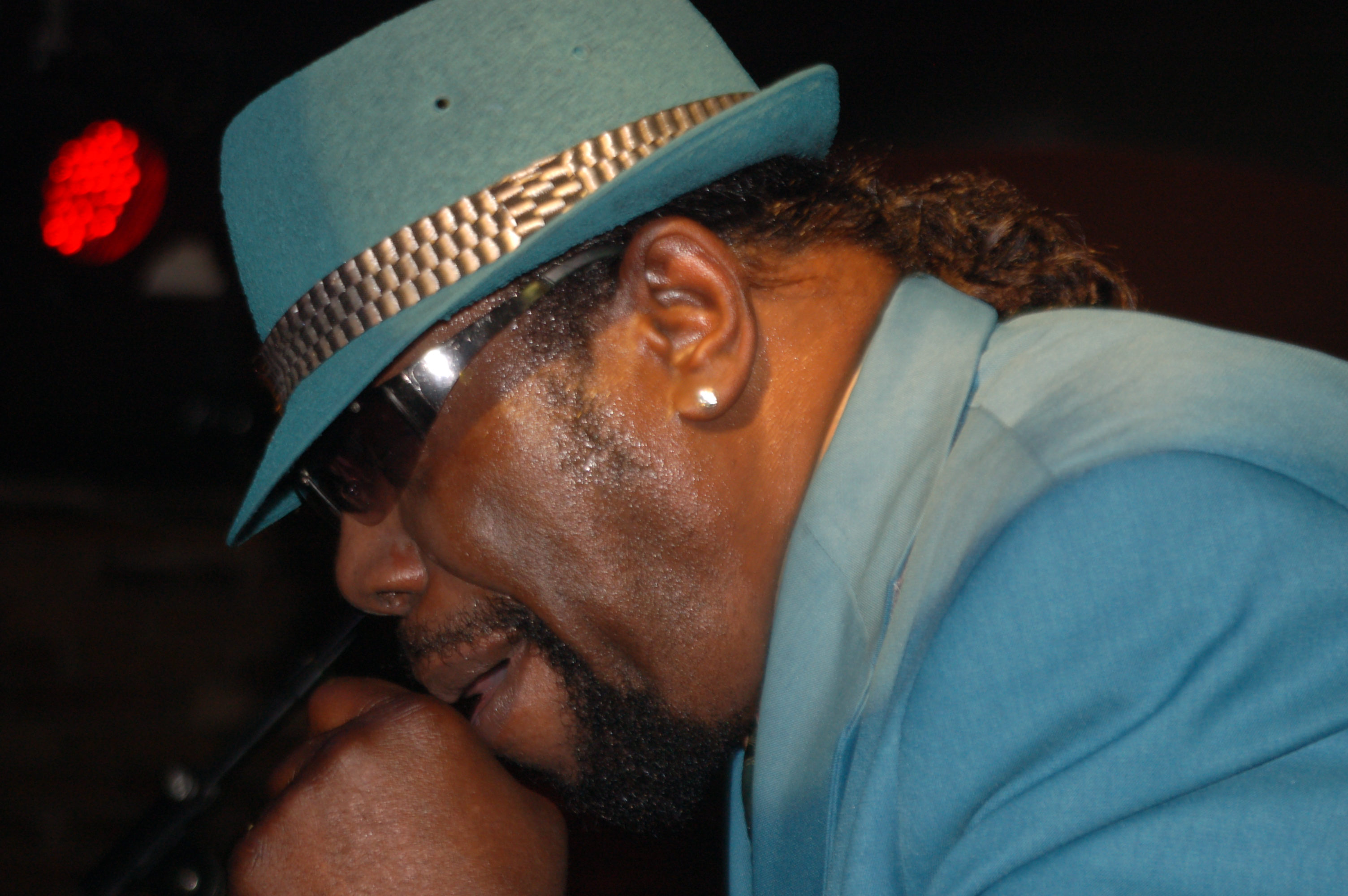
Mr. Symarip at a concert in Klub-Ost, Vienna

Symarip (also known at various stages of their career as The Bees, The Pyramids, Seven Letters and Zubaba) were a British ska and reggae band, originating in the late 1960s, when Frank Pitter and Michael Thomas founded the band as The Bees. The band's name was originally spelled Simaryp, which is an approximate reversal of the word pyramids. Consisting of members of West Indian descent, Simaryp is widely marked as one of the first skinhead reggae bands, being one of the first to target skinheads as an audience. Their hits included "Skinhead Girl", "Skinhead Jamboree" and "Skinhead Moonstomp", the latter based on the Derrick Morgan song, "Moon Hop".

They moved to Germany in 1971, performing reggae and Afro-rock under the name Zubaba. In 1980, the single "Skinhead Moonstomp" was re-issued in the wake of the 2 Tone craze, hitting No. 54 on the UK Singles Chart. The band officially split in 1985 after releasing the album Drunk & Disorderly as The Pyramids. The album was released by Ariola Records and was produced by Stevie B.

Pitter and Ellis moved back to England, where Ellis continued performing as a solo artist, sometimes using the stage name 'Mr. Symarip'. Mike Thomas met a Finnish woman while living in Switzerland and relocated to Finland doing the groundwork for the Finnish reggae culture through his band 'Mike T. Saganor'. Monty Neysmith moved to the United States, where he toured as a solo artist.

In 2004, Trojan Records released a best of album including a new single by Neysmith and Ellis, "Back From the Moon". In 2005, Neysmith and Ellis performed together at Club Ska in England, and a recording of the concert was released on Moon Ska Records as Symarip – Live at Club Ska. In April 2008, they headlined the Ska Splash Festival in Lincolnshire as Symarip, and later performed at the Endorse-It and Fordham Festivals. Pitter and Thomas now perform in a different band as Symarip Pyramid. Their Back From The Moon Tour 2008–2009 was with The Pioneers. In 2009, to celebrate the rebirth of the band and the reunion of the two original members, Trojan Records released a compilation album, Ultimate Collection. Pitter holds all copyright and trademark rights for the name 'Symarip Pyramid'.

== Line-up ==
- Roy Ellis – singer, trombone (1969–1985, 2019)
- Josh Roberts – guitar (1969–1985)
- Michael "Mik" Thomas – bass guitar (1969 – 1985, 2008 – present)
- Frank Pitter – drums (1969 – 1985, 2008 – present)
- Monty Neysmith – keyboards, including Hammond organ (1969 – 1985, 2010 – present)
- Roy Bug Knight – saxophone (2008 – present)
- Johney Johnson – trumpet (2008 – present)
- Carl Grifith – tenor and alto saxophone (2008 – present)

== Partial discography ==
=== Albums ===
- The Pyramids – The Pyramids – President – PTL-1021 (1968)
- Symarip – Skinhead Moonstomp – Trojan – TBL-102 (1970)
- Simaryp – Skinhead Moonstomp – Trojan – TRLS187 (1980)
- The Pyramids – Drunk and Disorderly – Ariola (1985)
- Symarip/The Pyramids/Seven Letters – The Best Of – Trojan TJACD154 (2004)
- Symarip/The Pyramids – Ultimate Collection – Trojan (2009)

=== Singles ===
- Blue Beat BB-386A "Jesse James Rides Again" (as The Bees) 1967
- Blue Beat BB-386B "The Girl in My Dreams" (as The Bees) 1967
- Clmbia Blue Beat DB-101A "Jesse James Rides Again" (as The Bees) 1967
- Clmbia Blue Beat DB-101B "The Girl in My Dreams" (as The Bees) 1967
- Clmbia Blue Beat DB-111A "Prisoner from Alcatraz" (as The Bees) 1967
- Clmbia Blue Beat DB-111B "The Ska's The Limit" (as The Bees) 1967
- President PT-161A "Train Tour To Rainbow City" 1967
- President PT-161B "John Chewey" 1967
- President PT-177A "Wedding in Peyton Place" 1968
- President PT-177B "Girls, Girls, Girls" 1968
- President PT-195A "All Change on the Bakerloo Line" 1968
- President PT-195B "Playing Games" 1968
- President PT-206A "Mexican Moonlight" 1968
- President PT-206B "Mule" 1968
- President PT-225A "Tisko My Darling" 1968
- President PT-225B "Movement All Around" 1968
- President PT-243A "Do Re Mi" 1969
- President PT-243B "I'm Outnumbered" 1969
- President PT-274A "I'm a Man" 1969
- President PT-274B "Dragonfly" 1969
- Attack ATT-8013A "I'm A Puppet" (as Symarip) 1969
- Attack ATT-8013B "Vindication" (as Symarip) 1969
- Doctor Bird DB-1189A "People Get Ready" (as Seven Letters) 1969
- Doctor Bird DB-1189B "The Fit" (as Seven Letters) 1969
- Doctor Bird DB-1194A "Please Stay" (as Seven Letters) 1969
- Doctor Bird DB-1194B "Special Beat" (as Seven Letters) 1969
- Doctor Bird DB-1195A "Flour Dumpling" (as Seven Letters) 1969
- Doctor Bird DB-1195B "Equality" (as Seven Letters) 1969
- Doctor Bird DB-1206A "Mama Me Want Girl" (as Seven Letters) 1969
- Doctor Bird DB-1206B "Sentry" (as Seven Letters) 1969
- Doctor Bird DB-1207A "Soul Crash (Soul Serenade)" (as Seven Letters) 1969
- Doctor Bird DB-1207B "Throw Me Things" (as Seven Letters) 1969
- Doctor Bird DB-1208A "There Goes My Heart" (as Seven Letters) 1969
- Doctor Bird DB-1208B "Wish" (as Seven Letters) 1969
- Doctor Bird DB-1209A "Bam Bam Baji" (as Seven Letters) 1969
- Doctor Bird DB-1209B "Hold Him Joe" (as Seven Letters) 1969
- Doctor Bird DB-1306A "Fung Sure" (as Simaryp) 1969
- Doctor Bird DB-1306B "Tomorrow at Sundown" (as Simaryp) 1969
- Doctor Bird DB-1307A "Stay With Him" 1969
- Doctor Bird DB-1307B "Chicken Mary" 1969
- Treasure Isle TI-7050A "Skinhead Moonstomp" 1969
- Treasure Isle TI-7050B "Must Catch A Train" 1969
- Treasure Isle TI-7054A "Parson's Corner" 1970
- Treasure Isle TI-7054B "Redeem" 1970
- Treasure Isle TI-7055A "La Bella Jig" 1970
- Treasure Isle TI-7055B "Holiday by the Sea" 1970
- Attack ATT-8013A "I'm A Puppet" 1970
- Attack ATT-8013B "Vindication" 1970
- Duke DU-80A "Geronimo" 1970
- Duke DU-80B "Feel Alright" 1970
- Trojan TR-7755A "Feel Alright" 1970
- Trojan TR-7755B "Telstar" 1970
- Trojan TR-7770A "To Sir With Love" 1970
- Trojan TR-7770B "Reggae Shuffle" 1970
- Trojan TR-7803A "All For You" 1971
- Trojan TR-7803B "All For You" (version) 1971
- Trojan TR-7814B (1) "Stingo" 1971
- Trojan TR-7814B (2) "Geronimo" 1971
- Creole CR-1003A "Mosquito Bite"
- Creole CR-1003B "Mother's Bath"
- Creole CR-1006A "Can't Leave Now"
- Creole CR-1006B "Teardrops"
- Rhino RNO-129A "Jesse James Rides Again" 1974
