= Dominik Pyrzyna =

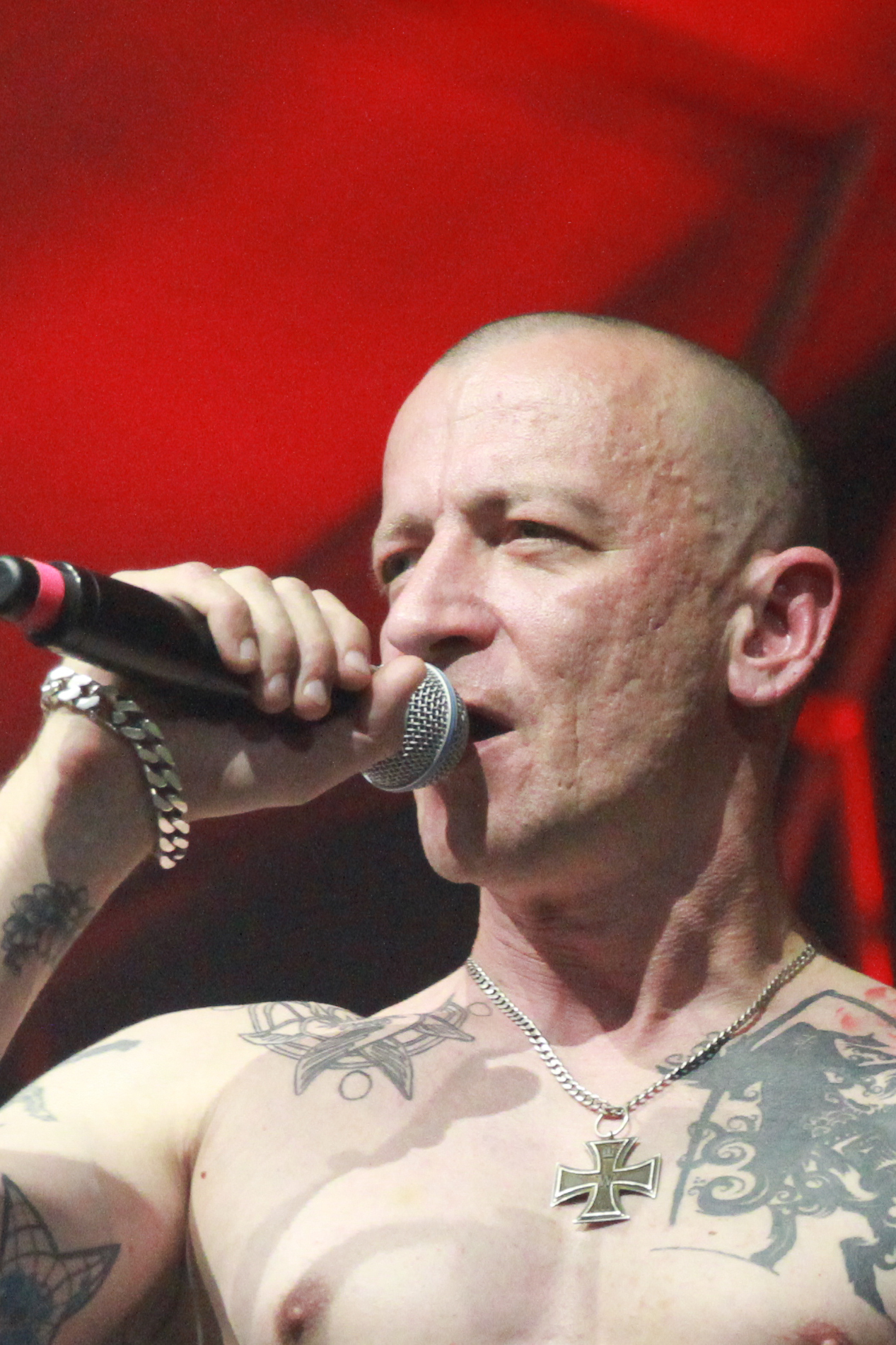
Dominik Pyrzyna (2015)

Dominik Pyrzyna (also known as Harcerz (Polish for Boy Scout)) is the former vocalist of Polish street punk band The Analogs. His birthday is October 25.
