= Paweł Czekała =

Polish musician

Piguła
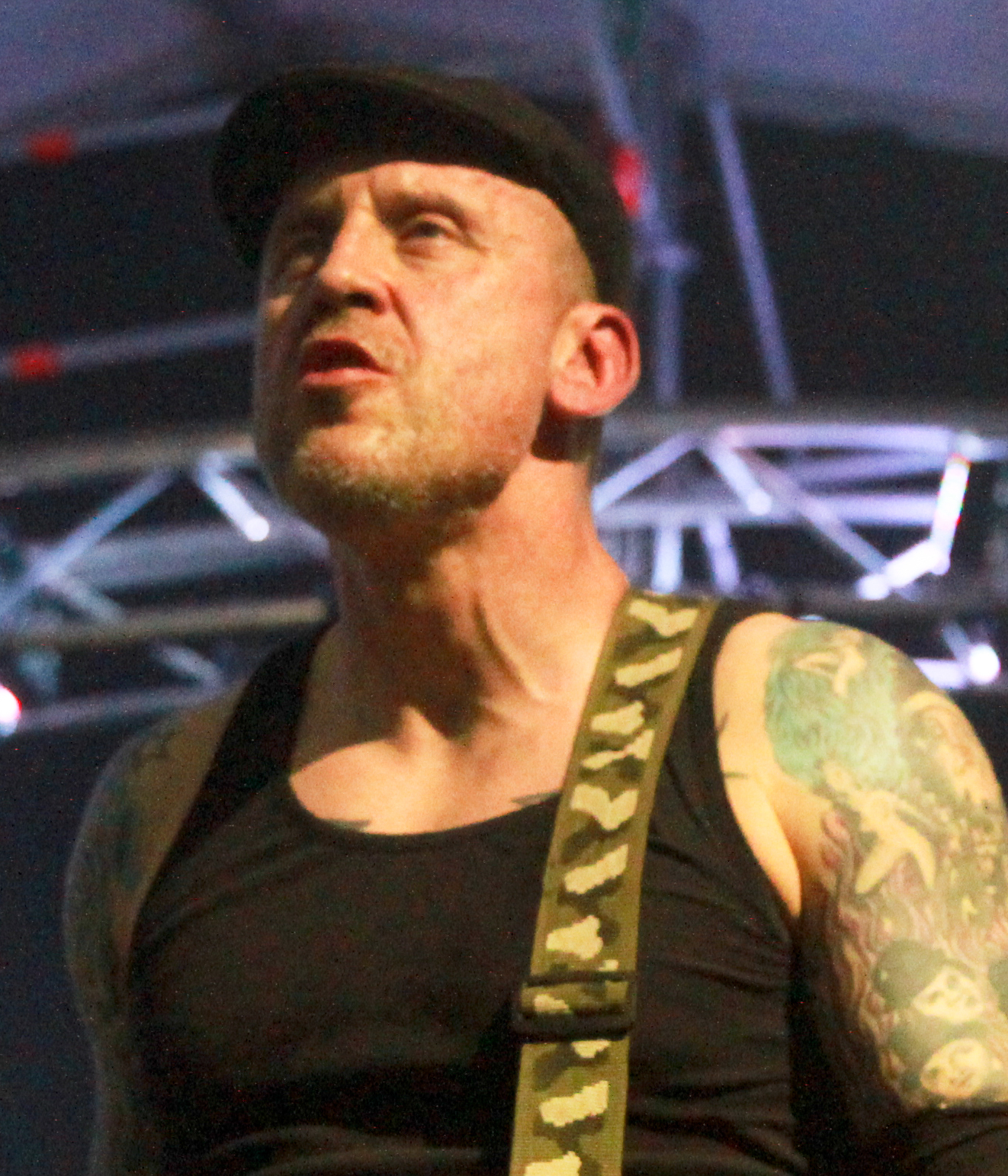
- Piguła at Przystanek Woodstock 2015
- Born: Paweł Czekała; 16 November 1970 (age 55); Szczecin, Poland
- Occupations: Singer; songwriter; guitarist; bassist
- Spouse: Weronika Korbal
- Musical career
- Genres: Punk rock; street punk; hardcore punk; oi!; ska; reggae; hip hop
- Instruments: Guitar; bass guitar; vocals
- Years active: 1995–present
- Labels: Rock'n'roller; Jimmy Jazz Records; Oldschool Records
- Website: www.analogs.pl

Paweł Czekała (born 16 November 1970), known commonly under his nickname Piguła, (Note: Czekała's nickname Piguła is a Polish augmentative for pill.) is the founder, former bassist, and current guitarist of the influential Polish street punk band The Analogs.

Piguła formed The Analogs in 1995 and, excluding the years he spent imprisoned, has been with the band non-stop since then as its primary songwriter. Initially he played bass guitar and provided backing vocals for The Analogs, but in 2008 he switched to lead guitar. In recent years Czekała has also began occasionally performing as the lead singer on a very small fraction of the songs the band plays live, such as a cover of the classic "Skinhead Girl" song during a November 2019 concert in London where the band played alongside the famous ska artist Roy Ellis. In 2020 he started his own multi-genre vocal project called Piguła Original.

== Biography ==
=== Early life ===
Paweł Czekała was born in 1970 and grew up in disadvantaged tower block residential areas of Szczecin during the economic troubles the Polish People's Republic was experiencing in the 1980s. It is also during this time that Czekała became interested in punk rock music. He attended the Constantin Brâncuși High School of Art in Szczecin.

=== Musical beginnings ===
From 1988 Piguła performed vocals for the grindcore band Strawberry, with whom they self-released an album in 1989. He would later sing in the crossover thrash group D.E.I.M.O.S., which released an album in 1992 followed by a demo in 1993 before splitting up. Later in the 1990s, this time with a bass guitar in hand, he formed the short-lived Dr. Cycos with Marek “Oreł” Adamowicz on the guitar and Ziemowit Pawluk playing the drums. Their 1996 cassette was one of the first ska releases in Poland. It was with these men that he would make a decision which would define much of his musical career.

=== The Analogs and run-ins with the law ===
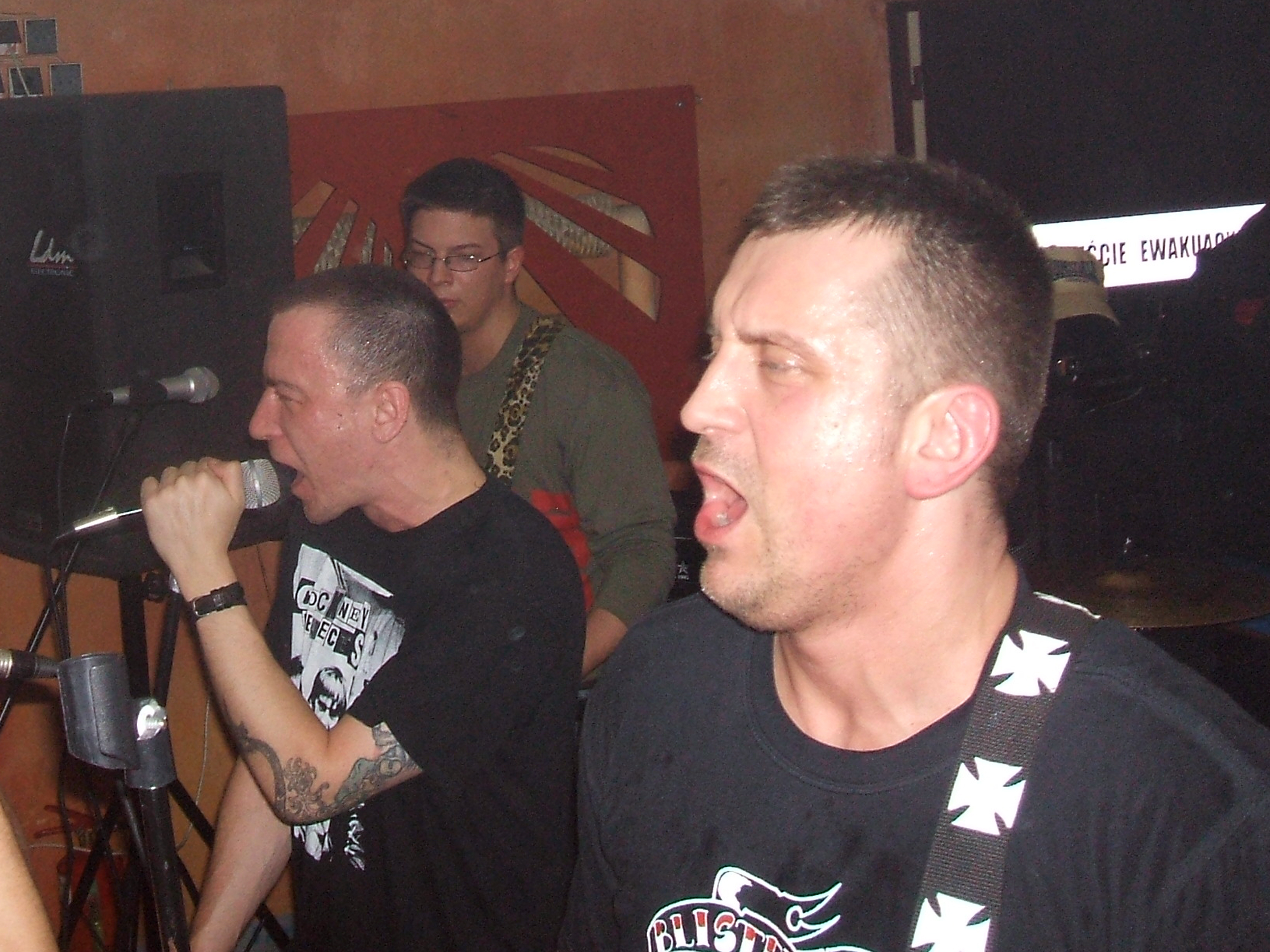
Harcerz (left) and Piguła (right) playing live for The Analogs in Tczew, March 2007

It was in 1995, at the Bronx pub in Szczecin with Oreł and Pawluk, that Piguła formed The Analogs – a band that would go on to become a leading group of the street punk and Oi! genres in Poland. The band initially struggled with finding a suitable vocalist, with an early candidate being Tomasz Iwanow, but this did not work out and eventually Dominik Pyrzyna became the band's longtime singer. The band relatively quickly grew popular on the Polish punk scene and released three albums in the first three years of their activity, continuing with nine more in the decade that followed.

However, by the time the first album of The Analogs was released, Piguła was serving a prison sentence for taking part in an organised criminal group; his time in jail, spread over two sentences that lasted almost five years in total, affected him deeply and made him turn his life around after being let back out; he would later reflect on his experiences in some of the lyrics of the band's songs, for which he was always the main writer. Upon leaving prison for the second time, Czekała became straight edge dedicating his life to music and sports. In the 2000s Paweł Czekała also played in the hardcore bands The Hunkies and Street Chaos as well as the 1977-style punk group Anti Dread, but The Analogs remained his main focus.

=== Projekt Pudło ===
The Analogs continued to play with some membership changes over the years, but Piguła remained a central figure within it as its bassist and songwriter as well as providing backing vocals. In 2008 he switched to lead guitar and Tomasz Majorek replaced him on the bass (the latter was replaced by Przemysław "Benon" Kaczmarek in 2013). In 2011, Czekała won two medals at the European Championship of Brazilian jiu-jitsu in Lisbon. The Analogs released ten more albums in the 2010s, continuing its popular live performances garnering attention both domestically and abroad. By 2018, Czekała along with fellow The Analogs guitarist and main vocalist Kamil Rosiak began touring penitentiaries, correctional facilities, and drug addiction centres as a duet called Projekt Pudło (Note: The name Projekt Pudło can be translated as "Project Nick", with the Polish word pudło literally meaning "box", but in this context it refers to the colloquial term for prison, similarly to the noun "nick" in British slang.) to play acoustic versions of their well-known songs – not only as entertainment, but as part of a resocialisation process for the inmates and others also. This campaign was deemed largely successful and received some attention in Polish media. In an August 2020 interview with Wirtualna Polska, Piguła described it thus:

I thought to myself that because my life became so happily arranged, I could show others that you don't have to go back to the nick right after you get out it. And it works, because I get signals from therapists and psychologists that inmates are more likely to listen to a person with experiences like mine than to educators. This year, The Analogs and Projekt Pudło played a total of over 160 concerts. The interest from the penitentiaries is very high, unfortunately we had to stop with the concerts due to the pandemic. I hope that we can go on tour again this fall. (Note: Original quote: "Pomyślałem sobie, że ponieważ tak szczęśliwie poukładało mi się w życiu, mógłbym pokazać innym, że po wyjściu z pudła nie trzeba do niego zaraz wracać. I to działa, bo dostaję sygnały od terapeutów i psychologów, że osadzeni chętniej słuchają takiego człowieka po przejściach jak ja niż wychowawców. W tym roku The Analogs i Projekt Pudło zagrały łącznie ponad 160 koncertów. Zainteresowanie zakładów jest bardzo duże, niestety przez pandemię musieliśmy przystopować z koncertami. Mam nadzieję, że na jesień znowu ruszymy w trasę.)

— Paweł "Piguła" Czekała, during an August 2020 interview with Grzegorz Kłos from Wirtualna Polska

Fundraisers, charity events, and tours around Polish jails culminated in the release of an acoustic album of the same name by The Analogs, which was successful and has gathered even more respect for the band on the scene as well as helping them continue Projekt Pudło live.

=== Hot16 and Disso Polo ===
In May 2020, friends nominated Piguła to take part in the Hot16Challenge. Piguła responded and, after seeing a highly controversial entry into the challenge by Polish far-right politician Janusz Korwin-Mikke, decided to dedicate his 16 verses of rap music against the far right in Poland. Piguła's entry also stirred some controversy, with an overwhelmingly negative reaction from fascist and right-wing circles but a mostly positive response from the far left, who saw it as brave and a refreshing voice on the Polish left-wing that was seen as genuine, coming from a working-class background without being academic or elitist. Czekała's entry into the challenge caused a number of other artists to step up and unite, with the result being a collaboration between 23 different artists (mostly from Poland, but also Belarus and Italy) releasing a new album called Disso Polo (Note: The name Disso Polo is a play on the terms disco polo and diss track.) under Czekała's Piguła Original project at the end of July, 2020; the record has been described as a "musical rodeo", combining elements of hardcore punk, rapping, reggae, and other genres into one album that sends an anti-capitalist, anti-fascist, anti-homophobic, and environmentalist message. Piguła wrote many of the lyrics, as well as performing the vocals and playing bass/guitar for many tracks. Alongside numerous others, participants in Disso Polo include Igor Bancer from Mister X and Mark Marlowski of Booze & Glory.

== Personal life ==
Piguła lives with his partner Weronika Korbal, whom he helps with her feline wellbeing group Kocie Warpno and label Oldschool Records; he is deeply attached to his cats, espouses left-wing views, and is an outspoken opponent of the Catholic Church in Poland. Sport and music have played an important part in his life, especially after leaving prison. Since the beginning of his musical career, Czekała has been strongly opposed to racism in the skinhead and Oi! scene, recognising its Jamaican and multi-cultural roots. In 2019, Czekała along with his partner Weronika and their neighbour Ms. Kazia have helped around 80 cats in the local area through their voluntary Kocie Warpno initiative.
