= Jimmy Jazz Records =

Polish independent record label

- Founder: Zdzisław Jodko
- Genre: punk rock, ska, psychobilly, hardcore punk
- Country of origin: Poland
- Location: Szczecin, Poland
- Official website: www.jimmyjazz.pl

Jimmy Jazz Records is a Polish independent record label from Szczecin. It releases mostly punk rock, ska, psychobilly and hardcore music artists. The label issues its own zine Garaż. Aside from records, Jimmy Jazz sells clothes and other merchandise connected with the music it promotes.

== History ==
Jimmy Jazz Records was started by Zdzisław Jodko, who had previously run Rock'n'Roller record label. Most of the bands who released their albums under Rock'n'Roller continued to co-operate with Jimmy Jazz Records.

== Artists ==
- The Analogs
- Anarchol
- Anti Dread
- Bang Bang (Polish band)
- The Cuffs
- Dumbs
- The Headhunters
- Karcer
- Power Girls
- Boy Come Men
- Stars
- Black & Red
- Girlz68
- Sonic Wasteland
- Procurator
- Supergrupa'81
- Quo Vadis
- Kapral Zajączek
- Rewizja

=== Former artists ===
This includes artists whose records were released by Rock'n'Roller label, the predecessor of Jimmy Jazz records.

- Bazooka Service
- Beerzone
- Dr Cycos
- The Hunkies

== Compilations ==
- Punks, Skins & Rudeboys Now! - a series of CDs accompanying Garaż zine.
- Prowadź Mnie Ulico, 2004
- Prowadź Mnie Ulico Vol. 2, 2005
- Tribute to Partia, 2006
- Prowadź Mnie Ulico Vol. 3, 2006
- Prowadź Mnie Ulico Vol. 4, 2007
- One Race - Human Race. Music Against Racism: Part 2, 2021 re-release (original release in 1998 on the label QQRYQ)
