= We Are the Champions of the World =

Compilation album by The Lawrence Arms
- Released: March 30, 2018
- Recorded: 1999–2014
- Genre: Punk rock
- Length: 76:54
- Label: Fat Wreck Chords

The Lawrence Arms chronology
Metropole (2014)	We Are the Champions of the World (2018)	Skeleton Coast (2020)

Professional ratings
Review scores
Source	Rating
Away from Life	5/5 stars
Bad Copy	(mildly favorable)
Punknews.org	4.5/5 stars
Punk Rock Theory	8.5/10 stars
Punktastic	(favorable)
Scene Point Blank	7.1/10 stars

We Are the Champions of the World is a compilation album of material by the Chicago punk rock band The Lawrence Arms. Released in 2018 by Fat Wreck Chords, it spans the band's entire career, and includes songs that were released on Fat Wreck Chords, Asian Man Records, and Epitaph Records. It concludes with 5 non-album tracks taken from recording sessions for the 2006 album Oh! Calcutta!, four of which were previously unreleased on any format.

The release of the album was followed by a tour across the United States, and later Europe, playing shows with Banner Pilot, The Menzingers, The Lillingtons, Lagwagon, and more.

The title of the album is supposed to be ironic. In an interview with Alternative Press, singer Brendan Kelly stated that We Are the Champions of the World is actually not a greatest hits album, but rather a compilation album attempting to be representative of the musical evolution the band has gone through. The idea of putting out We Are the Champions of the World comes from Fat Wreck Chords owner and NOFX singer Fat Mike.

I think you have to have hits to make a greatest hits, so we approached the song selection in an attempt to be indicative of our evolution, rather than focus on our "hits," of which, frankly, there are none.

— Brendan Kelly

== Track listing ==
No.	Title	From album	Length
1.	"On With the Show"	The Greatest Story Ever Told (2003)	1:20
2.	"Great Lakes/Great Escapes"	Oh! Calcutta! (2006)	2:50
3.	"Alert the Audience!"	The Greatest Story Ever Told (2003)	2:05
4.	"100 Resolutions"	Present Day Memories (2001)	3:28
5.	"The Devil's Takin' Names"	Oh! Calcutta! (2006)	2:00
6.	"Beautiful Things"	Metropole (2014)	3:02
7.	"Quincentuple Your Money"	Present Day Memories (2001)	3:00
8.	"The Slowest Drink at the Saddest Bar on the Snowiest Day in the Greatest City"	Buttsweat and Tears (2009)	3:13
9.	"Are You There Margaret? It's Me, God"	Oh! Calcutta! (2006)	3:36
10.	"Right as Rain Part 2"	Apathy and Exhaustion (2002)	2:39
11.	"Seventeener (17th and 37th)"	Metropole (2014)	2:39
12.	"Chapter 13: The Hero Appears"	The Greatest Story Ever Told (2003)	2:50
13.	"The Ramblin' Boys of Pleasure"	The Greatest Story Ever Told (2003)	2:44
14.	"Light Breathing (Me and Martha Plimpton in a Fancy Elevator)"	Ghost Stories (2000)	2:58
15.	"Like a Record Player"	Oh! Calcutta! (2006)	2:02
16.	"You Are Here"	Metropole (2014)	2:46
17.	"Boatless Booze Cruise Part 1"	Apathy and Exhaustion (2002)	3:28
18.	"Brick Wall Views"	Apathy and Exhaustion (2002)	4:12
19.	"Sixteen Hours"	Ghost Stories (2000)	1:07
20.	"Turnstiles"	Cocktails & Dreams (2005)	2:28
21.	"An Evening of Extraordinary Circumstance"	A Guided Tour of Chicago (1999)	2:55
22.	"The Northside, the L&L, and Any Number of Crappy Apartments"	A Guided Tour of Chicago (1999)	3:13
23.	"Porno and Snuff Films"	Apathy and Exhaustion (2002)	2:36
24.	"Demons"	Buttsweat and Tears (digital download exclusive, 2009)	2:15
25.	"The Rabbit and the Rooster"	Oh! Calcutta! (iTunes exclusive bonus track, 2006)	2:53
26.	"Catalog"	Previously unreleased	1:28
27.	"Black Snow"	Previously unreleased	2:26
28.	"Laugh Out Loud"	Previously unreleased	2:58
29.	"Warped Summer Extravaganza (Turbo Excellent)"	Previously unreleased	1:43

== Personnel ==
Performers

- Chris McCaughan – guitar, vocals
- Brendan Kelly – bass, vocals
- Neil Hennessy – drums

Production All songs recorded by Matt Allison at Atlas Studios in Chicago unless otherwise noted.

- Tracks 1, 3, 12, and 13 recorded in June 2003
- Tracks 2, 5, 9, 15, 25, 27, and 29 recorded in October and November 2005
- Tracks 4 and 7 recorded in January 2001
- Track 6, 11, and 16 recorded from June to September 2013
- Tracks 8 and 24 recorded in 2009
- Tracks 10, 17, 18, and 23 recorded in September and October 2001
- Tracks 14 and 19 recorded at Scientific Studios in December 1999 by Mike Giampa
- Track 20 re-recorded in early 2005
- Tracks 21 and 22 recorded in at Scientific Studios in Spring 1999 by Mike Giampa
- Tracks 26 and 28 recorded in 2005 by Justin Yates

Artwork

- Eric Baskauskas – cover art, layout
- Ben Pier – photos
- David Holtz – layout
