= Fested: A Journey to Fest 7 =

Fested: A Journey To Fest 7
- Directed by: Reese Lester
- Written by: Reese Lester
- Produced by: Reese Lester
- Starring: Spanish Gamble; OK Pilot
- Cinematography: Reese Lester; Tyler Neil
- Edited by: Reese Lester
- Distributed by: Blue Elephant Media
- Release date: September 15, 2010
- Running time: 105 minutes
- Country: United States
- Language: English

Fested: A Journey To Fest 7 is an American documentary film filmed over two weeks around and during The Fest 7 in Gainesville, FL in 2008. The movie was directed by Reese Lester about The Fest and a group of about a dozen close friends' experience attending and performing at it.

The film's title is a reference to one of the people in the film, David McMaster, referring to his highly intoxicated friend as "fested".

== Synopsis ==
From the official website (used with permission):

FESTED: A Journey To Fest 7 is a documentary film about the yearly punk music festival held in Gainesville, Florida simply called The Fest.

It was filmed over two weeks spent in Gainesville around Fest 7 in 2008. The film follows Gainesville's SPANISH GAMBLE (formerly DIRTY MONEY) and friends on their quest to play and experience the epic weekend-long festival that has been called things like "punk rock christmas", "a big, drunk, punk rock, bearded, tattooed family reunion", and "the last true home of punk rock".

In the spirit of Penelope Spheeris' Decline Of Western Civilization series, FESTED features interviews, performances, and who-knows-what from over 20 bands...

The artwork for the DVD was designed by Craig Horky, who also designed similar artwork for Spanish Gamble's debut album, "It's All Coming Down".

There are about 20 bands in the film either performing, being interviewed, or having a recorded track included: 10-4 Eleanor, American Steel, The Anchor, Dear Landlord, The Falcon, The Flatliners, Fleshies, Grabass Charlestons, Hour Of The Wolf, Lagrecia, LaSalle, The Lawrence Arms, New Mexican Disaster Squad, None More Black, Off With Their HEads, OK Pilot, Paint It Black, Spanish Gamble, Static Radio NJ, Tiltwheel, and Umoja Orchestra.

Throughout the film the band Spanish Gamble plays a leading role, though at the time they were known as Dirty Money.

The film was principally shot by Reese Lester and Tyler Neil, with National Underground also contributing some of their concert footage from The Fest.

== Live performances ==
- The Anchor
  - "This Is For My Friends"
- The Falcon
  - "The La-Z-Boy 500"
- The Flatliners
  - "July! August! Reno!"
- Hour Of The Wolf
  - "Eat You Alive"
  - "Fix Me" (Black Flag cover song)(On DVD extras)
- The Lawrence Arms
  - "Great Lakes/Great Escapes"
  - "Like A Record Player"
- New Mexican Disaster Squad
  - "Tightrope"
- None More Black
  - "We Dance On The Ruins Of The Stupid Stage"
  - "Dinner's For Suckers"
  - "Drop The Pop"
- OK Pilot
  - "No Sleeping On The Floor"
  - "Too Hot To Stop"
- Paint It Black
  - "Past Tense, Future Perfect"
  - "Atticus Finch"
  - "Memorial Day"
- Spanish Gamble
  - "1-2-3 Fest!" (as Dirty Money)
  - "From The Corazon" (as Dirty Money)
  - "Sunday Curse"
- Static Radio NJ
  - "Big Man, Small Mouth" (Minor Threat cover song)
- Umoja Orchestra
  - "Indocumentado"

== Recorded tracks ==
- 10-4 Eleanor
  - "Whispers In A Shot Glass"
  - "It's Alive!"
- American Steel
  - "Emergency House Party"
- Dear Landlord
  - "I Live In Hell"
- The Falcon
  - "Building The Perfect Asshole Parade"
- Fleshies
  - "Meatball"
- Grabass Charlestons
  - "Un-American"
- Lagrecia
  - "Hey Medic"
- Lasalle (band)
  - "Pretty World"
- The Lawrence Arms
  - "Like A Record Player
- Off With Their Heads
  - "I Am You"
- Paint It Black
  - "Memorial Day"
- Spanish Gamble
  - "We Are The Restless"
- Tiltwheel
  - "Fuck You, This Place Is Dead Anyway"

== Notable musicians interviewed ==
- Brendan Kelly (The Lawrence Arms, The Falcon)
- Dan Yemin (Paint It Black, Kid Dynamite)
- Adam Goren (Atom And His Package)
- Ryan Young (Off With Their Heads)
- Chris Cresswell and Jon Darbey (The Flatliners)

== Soundtrack ==
Fested: A Journey To Fest 7

Soundtrack album by Various Artists
- Released: August 2010
- Genre: Punk rock
- Label: Blue Elephant Media
- Producer: Reese Lester

The soundtrack was released in August 2010 by Blue Elephant Media as a Name Your Own Price digital download.

=== Track listing ===
1. "Fuck You, This Place Is Dead Anyway" – Tiltwheel
2. "1-2-3 Fest!" (Live) – Spanish Gamble (FKA Dirty Money)
3. "Like A Record Player" (Live) – The Lawrence Arms
4. "I Live In Hell" – Dead Landlord
5. "I Am You" – Off With Their Heads (band)
6. "We Dance On The Ruins Of The Stupid Stage" (Live) - None More Black
7. "Building The Perfect Asshole Parade" - The Falcon
8. "Pretty World" - LaSalle
9. "Hey Medic" - Lagrecia
10. "Too Hot To Stop" - OK Pilot
11. "Meatball" - Fleshies
12. "Tightrope" (Live) - New Mexican Disaster Squad
13. "We Are The Restless" - Spanish Gamble
14. "Memorial Day" - Paint It Black
15. "It's Alive!" - 10-4 Eleanor
