= Oh! Calcutta! (album) =

Studio album by the Lawrence Arms
- Released: March 7, 2006
- Recorded: October–November 2005
- Genre: Punk rock
- Length: 33:54
- Label: Fat Wreck Chords
- Producer: Matt Allison; The Lawrence Arms

The Lawrence Arms chronology
Cocktails & Dreams (2005)	Oh! Calcutta! (2006)	Buttsweat and Tears (2009)

Oh! Calcutta! is the fifth studio album by American punk rock band the Lawrence Arms, released in 2006 by Fat Wreck Chords. It is the band's third and last studio album to be released on Fat Wreck Chords. Brendan Kelly has stated that this is his favorite Lawrence Arms album. Punknews named this album the #1 album of 2000-2009.

== Composition and lyrics ==
In comparison with their previous album The Greatest Story Ever Told, Oh! Calcutta! is considerably faster-paced and more aggressive. It also finds Chris McCaughan and Brendan Kelly sharing vocal duties in an almost duet style, while on previous albums the two had split most of the lead vocals between songs.

The album's title demonstrates the band's propensity to juxtapose the twin elements of "legitimate" literature and philosophy and American pop culture, referencing both the 1969 off-Broadway revue of the same name and a comment made by Mother Teresa that conditions in Chicago's south side depressed her more than the poverty of Calcutta. The title of the song "Are You There Margaret? It's Me, God" references the book Are You There God? It's Me, Margaret. by Judy Blume, while the title "Jumping the Shark" references a pop culture term describing an episode of Happy Days. "Requiem Revisited" borrows melodies from the Naked Raygun song, "Soldier's Requiem." The whispered lyrics in the beginning of it are taken from the Nomeansno song "Brother Rat." The title of "Lose Your Illusion 1" is a reference to the Guns N' Roses album Use Your Illusion I. The album contains a "hidden" track after the last song entitled "Warped Summer Extravaganza (Major Excellent)," a reference to the band's experiences on the Warped Tour.

In a style that parallels the band's previous album The Greatest Story Ever Told, the inside back cover of the liner notes bears a pair of quotations designed to illustrate the album's juxtaposition of "legitimate" literature and philosophy with American pop culture:

- "As flies to wanton boys, are we to the gods; they kill us for their sport."

-from William Shakespeare's King Lear, Act IV, scene i

- "Billy, you are dealing with the oddity of time travel with the greatest of ease."

-Alex Winter in Bill & Ted's Excellent Adventure

== Release ==
A music video for "The Devil's Takin' Names" was filmed in January 2006 with director Bob Trondson. On January 21, 2006, the album's artwork and track listing were posted online. In February and March 2006, preceded by three shows with the Loved Ones, the Lawrence Arms supported NOFX on their headlining US tour. Between February 9, 2006 and the album's March 7, 2006 release date, a different song was made available to stream on a daily basis through their Myspace profile. To promote the album, a contest was held were fans could win lyric sheets for one of each of the songs. The iTunes version of the album also included an extra track "The Rabbit and the Rooster". They went on a brief tour with the Blackout Pact and Latterman around the album's release. A music video for "The Devil's Takin' Names" was posted on Alternative Press' website on March 13, 2006. In April and May 2006, the Lawrence Arms supported No Use for a Name on their headlining European tour (which included an appearance at the Groezrock festival), then Alkaline Trio on their short West Coast headlining tour, running into June 2006.

The Lawrence Arms supported Lagwagon on their US tour in July and August 2006, before embarking on their own headlining US tour, with support from the Draft and the Blackout Pact. Bullets to Broadway was also due to support, but had to cancelled due to one of the members having a family illness. In October 2006, the band appeared at The Fest, and played a few shows with Chuck Ragan. They closed out the year with an appearance at the CMJ Music Marathon, and supporting Frenzal Rhomb on their tour of Australia in December 2006. Following an appearance at the Shameless Hours festival, the band embarked on a headlining US tour in October and November 2007 with American Steel, the Falcon, and Sundowner, which included a performance at The Fest. Their 2018 compilation album We Are the Champions of the World featured 4 additional songs from the album's recording sessions.

== Reception ==
Professional ratings
Review scores
Source	Rating
Allmusic	link
Punknews.org	link
Stylus Magazine	( B ) link

Punknews.org ranked the album third on their list of the 20 best releases of 2006.

== Track listing ==
All songs written by the Lawrence Arms.

No.	Title	Length
1.	"The Devil’s Takin’ Names"	2:00
2.	"Cut It Up"	2:13
3.	"Great Lakes / Great Escapes"	2:49
4.	"Recovering the Opposable Thumb"	3:05
5.	"Beyond the Embarrassing Style"	2:24
6.	"Are You There Margaret? It’s Me, God."	3:35
7.	"Jumping the Shark"	2:36
8.	"Lose Your Illusion 1"	2:59
9.	"Requiem Revisited"	2:07
10.	"Key to the City"	3:01
11.	"Old Dogs Never Die"	2:12
12.	"Like a Record Player / Warped Summer Extravaganza (Major Excellent)"	4:51
Total length:		33:54

- The iTunes edition separates "Like a Record Player" and "Warped Summer Extravaganza (Major Excellent)" into two tracks, and includes the bonus track "The Rabbit and the Rooster".

== Personnel ==
- Chris McCaughan - guitar, vocals
- Brendan Kelly - bass, vocals
- Neil Hennessy - drums
- Ryan Hennessy - country guitar on "Warped Summer Extravaganza (Major Excellent)", additional backing vocals
- Rich Gill, Kat, Dan Schafer, and Marcus Kretzmann - backing vocals

== Album information ==
- Record label: Fat Wreck Chords
- Recorded October – November 2005 analog onto 2-inch tape
- All songs by the Lawrence Arms, copyright 2005 Florence Farms ASCAP
- Engineered and mixed by Matt Allison
- Produced by Matt Allison and the Lawrence Arms
- Mastered by Colossal in Chicago, Illinois
- Photos by Ben Pier
- Art slapped together by Sergie
- Layout by David Holtz
