= Four One Five Two =

Studio album by Sundowner
- Released: March 13, 2007
- Genre: Acoustic; Folk punk
- Length: 37:30
- Label: Red Scare Industries
- Producer: Chris McCaughan, and Brendan Kelly

Sundowner chronology
Four One Five Two (2007)	We Chase the Waves (2010)

Four One Five Two is the debut album of Chicago Illinois's Sundowner, the acoustic side-project from Chris McCaughan, singer guitarist of The Lawrence Arms. The album was released on March 13, 2007, after many months of playing coffee shops and touring alongside The Lawrence Arms.

The album consists of twelve songs, ten of which were previously unreleased in any form and two of which (My Boatless Booze Cruise, One Hundred Resolutions) are remakes of Lawrence Arms songs.

The album takes its name from McCaughan's childhood home address. Its cover artwork was designed by artist Heather Hannoura, best known for designing merchandise for many punk rock bands, including Green Day, Alkaline Trio, AFI, and Rancid.

Professional ratings
Review scores
Source	Rating
Music Emissions	link
Punknews.org	link

== Track listing ==
Four One Five Two track listing
No.	Title	Length
1.	"Steal Your Words"	2:16
2.	"This War Is Noise"	2:49
3.	"The Sea of Lights"	2:37
4.	"Traffic Haze"	2:50
5.	"Midsummer Classic"	3:46
6.	"My Boatless Booze Cruise"	3:10
7.	"Your Self Portrait"	2:07
8.	"Jackson Underground"	3:20
9.	"Endless Miles"	4:21
10.	"Cold White North"	2:35
11.	"One Hundred Resolutions"	4:29
12.	"Audio Geography"	3:11
Total length:		39:31

- While the album has no singles, a video for "This War Is Noise" was posted on YouTube, directed by Brendan Kelly (fellow Lawrence Arms member).

== Personnel ==
- Chris McCaughan (vocals, acoustic guitars)
- Jenny Choi (cello, piano, background vocals)
- Neil Hennessy (acoustic bass)
