= Slapstick (disambiguation) =

Slapstick is a concept that occurs in many forms of comedy involving exaggerated physical activity.

Slaptick may also refer to:

- Operation Slapstick, a British military operation during the Allied invasion of Italy
- Slapstick (novel), a 1976 novel by Kurt Vonnegut
  - Slapstick of Another Kind, a 1984 American film based on the novel
- Slapstick (musical instrument), a percussion instrument
- Slapstick (character), a Marvel character
- Slapstick (band), an American ska punk band
  - Slapstick (album), 1997
- Slapstick, also known as Robotrek, a 1994 video game
- "Slapstick" (The Wire), a television episode
- A slang term for an automated manual transmission
