= Sanawon =

Sanawon is a duo from Chicago, Illinois. The band's name is Korean for fierce. After touring extensively as a solo artist and promoting her own A.I.R. (Asians in Rock) tour with Asian Man Records' Mike Park, singer-songwriter Jenny Choi recruited the help of longtime drummer Philip Stone to create an indie/pop band. The duo are referenced in the Bomb the Music Industry! song, 'The First Time I Met Sanawon'.

Sanawon have toured with bands such as Mike Park, Colossal, The Like Young, Versus, Ida, and Beauty Pill.

Jenny Choi provided cello and backing vocals for several songs on Sundowner's 2007 debut album, Four One Five Two.

== Discography ==
- The Promise (2011, Quote Unquote Records)
- Bonfire Night (2007, Ona Records)
- Tiny Airplane (2005, Suburban Home Records)
