= Buttsweat and Tears =

EP by The Lawrence Arms
- Released: October 27, 2009
- Recorded: June 2009
- Genre: Punk rock
- Length: 11:33 (7") / 13:47 (download)
- Label: Fat Wreck Chords

The Lawrence Arms chronology
Oh! Calcutta! (2006)	Buttsweat and Tears (2009)	Metropole (2014)

Professional ratings
Review scores
Source	Rating
Absolutepunk.net	(87%) link
Alternative Press	link
Sputnikmusic	link

Buttsweat and Tears is an EP by the Chicago punk rock band The Lawrence Arms, released October 27, 2009 by Fat Wreck Chords. It was the first recorded output from the band in three years, following their 2006 album Oh! Calcutta! In the interim, singer/bassist Brendan Kelly and drummer Neil Hennessy performed in The Falcon, Hennessy also performed in the Smoking Popes, and singer/guitarist Chris McCaughan performed in Sundowner.

The band recorded the EP in June 2009. Kelly announced its title in August, noting that the band had come up with the title and cover art ten years previous and intended to use it for a debut 7-inch that was never recorded (the band's first release was the album A Guided Tour of Chicago):

When my band, the Lawrence Arms, first started, we had this idea for a seven inch. We had the title picked out and we even knew what the cover was gonna be. We promised ourselves that our first seven inch would have this name and this cover. Well, we never did a seven inch (except for one that was part of a label series, which meant that the cover and the title were sort of more beholden to the big picture rather than our dumb ideas) and the whole thing kind of languished, and now, ten years later, in conjunction with our ten year anniversary show and subsequent west coast run (the first run in over 2 years), we've got our first real seven inch on our hands. And guess what? We fucking named it the name that we thought up ten years ago.

The EP's release date and cover art were announced the following week. It was released both as a 7-inch vinyl record and as a digital download, the latter including an extra song. The band supported the release with a tenth anniversary performance in October 2009 at the Metro Chicago, followed by a seven-date headlining tour of Arizona and California the following month with Teenage Bottlerocket and Cobra Skulls. The tracklisting for the physical release was announced on October 5, 2009.

== Track listing ==
7"
No.	Title	Length
1.	"Spit Shining Shit"	2:54
2.	"The Slowest Drink at the Saddest Bar on the Snowiest Day in the Greatest City"	3:13
3.	"Them Angels Been Talkin’"	2:48
4.	"The Redness in the West"	2:38
Total length:		11:33

Digital download
No.	Title	Length
1.	"Spit Shining Shit"	2:54
2.	"The Slowest Drink at the Saddest Bar on the Snowiest Day in the Greatest City"	3:13
3.	"Them Angels Been Talkin’"	2:48
4.	"Demons"	2:14
5.	"The Redness in the West"	2:38
Total length:		13:47

== Personnel ==
- Chris McCaughan - guitar, vocals, bass guitar on "The Redness in the West"
- Brendan Kelly - bass guitar, vocals, guitar on "The Redness in the West"
- Neil Hennessy - drums
