= Baseball's Sad Lexicon =

Baseball poem by Franklin Pierce Adams

- by Franklin Pierce Adams
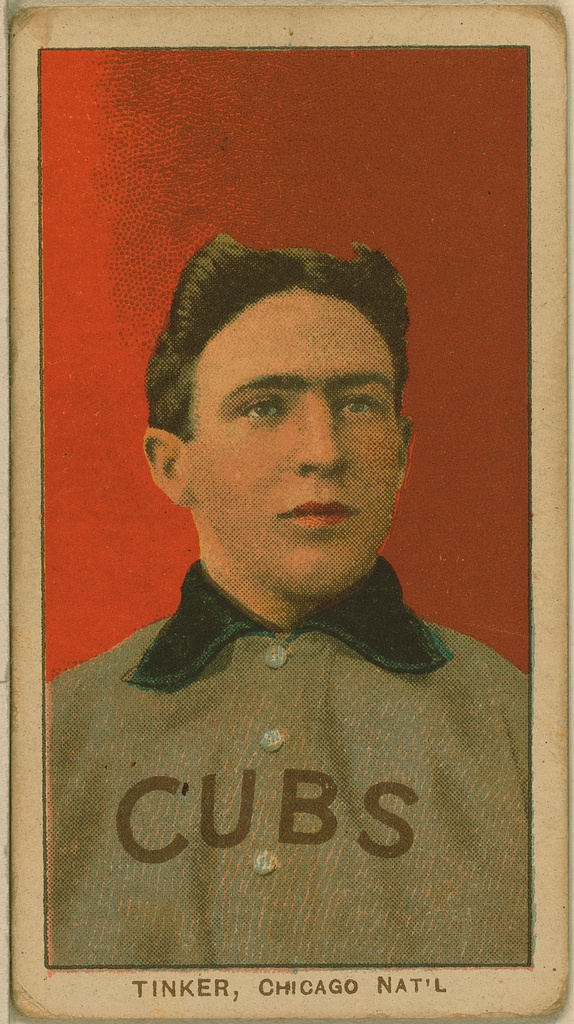
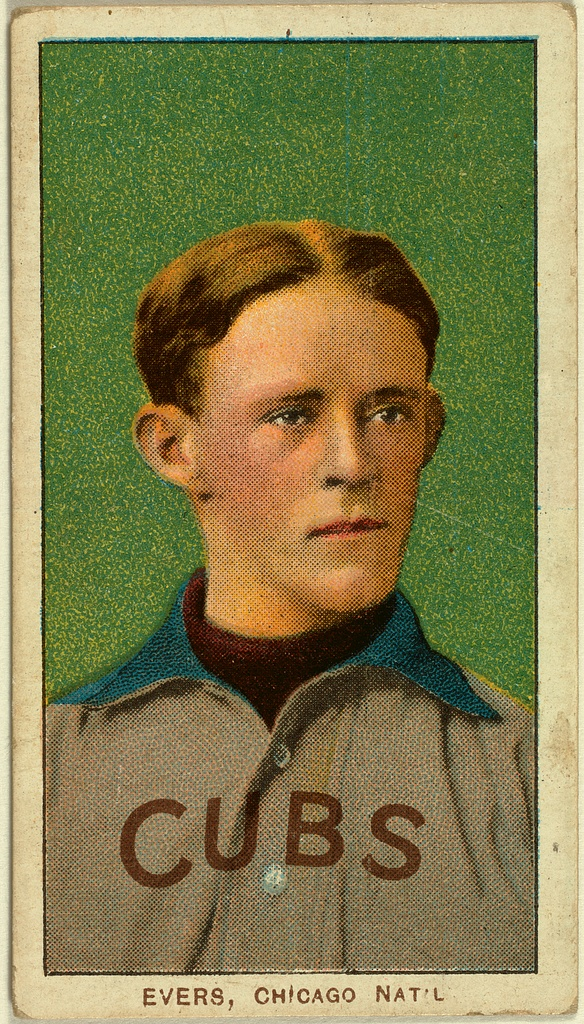
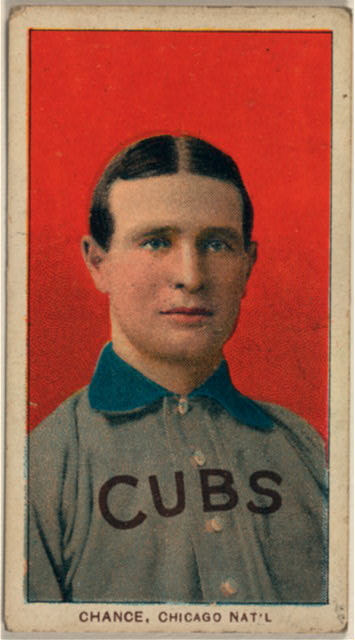
- Joe Tinker Johnny Evers Frank Chance The three Chicago Cubs of the poem
- Original title: That Double Play Again
- Subject: Baseball
- Publisher: New York Evening Mail
- Publication date: July 12, 1910
- Lines: 8

Full text
- Baseball's Sad Lexicon at Wikisource

"Baseball's Sad Lexicon", also known as "Tinker to Evers to Chance" after its refrain, is a 1910 baseball poem by Franklin Pierce Adams. The eight-line poem is presented as a single, rueful stanza from the point of view of a New York Giants fan watching the Chicago Cubs infield of shortstop Joe Tinker, second baseman Johnny Evers, and first baseman Frank Chance complete a double play. These three players helped the Cubs win four National League championships and two World Series from 1906 to 1910.

"Baseball's Sad Lexicon" became popular across the United States among sportswriters, who wrote their own verses along the same vein. The poem only enhanced the reputations of Tinker, Evers, and Chance over the succeeding decades as the phrase became synonymous with a feat of smooth and ruthless efficiency. It has been credited with their elections to the National Baseball Hall of Fame in 1946.

== Publication ==
The poem was first published in the New York Evening Mail on July 12, 1910, under the title "That Double Play Again." The day before, the Cubs had defeated the Giants, 4–2, in Chicago, having squelched a late-inning Giants rally with a double play from shortstop Tinker to second baseman Evers to first baseman Chance. Per standard baseball positions, this play is recorded as 6-4-3 (shortstop to second baseman to first baseman).

A reading of Baseball's Sad Lexicon

These are the saddest of possible words:
"Tinker to Evers to Chance."
Trio of bear cubs, and fleeter than birds,
Tinker and Evers and Chance.
Ruthlessly pricking our gonfalon (Note: A gonfalon is a pennant or flag, referring in this context to the National League title.) bubble,
Making a Giant hit into a double (Note: "Hitting a double" in baseball means a two-base hit, but "hitting into a double" refers to hitting into a double play (two outs on a single play), most commonly accomplished by a ground ball hit to the shortstop (Tinker) thrown to the second baseman (Evers) to force the runner out who had been on first base and then thrown to first base (Chance) to complete the play.) –
Words that are heavy with nothing but trouble:
"Tinker to Evers to Chance."

== Background ==
Tinker, Evers, and Chance began playing together with the Cubs in September 1902, forming a double play combination that lasted through April 1912. The Cubs won the National League pennant four times from 1906 to 1910 and won back-to-back World Series championships in 1907 and 1908, a five-year span that saw them regularly defeat their archrival Giants en route to the pennants and World Series.

=== Context in baseball history ===
Frank Chance joined the Chicago Cubs in 1898 as a reserve catcher, backing up Tim Donahue and Johnny Kling. Frank Selee, the Cubs' manager, decided that Chance would be better suited as a first baseman. Chance at first opposed the move and even threatened to quit, but he ultimately obliged.

Joe Tinker was a third baseman in minor league baseball but in 1902 made the Cubs as a shortstop, replacing Barry McCormick.

Johnny Evers made his major league debut with the Cubs on September 1, 1902 at shortstop, with Selee moving Tinker from shortstop to third base. Three days later, Selee returned Tinker to shortstop and assigned Evers to second base to back up Bobby Lowe. Lowe suffered a knee injury late in the 1902 season, providing Evers with more playing time.

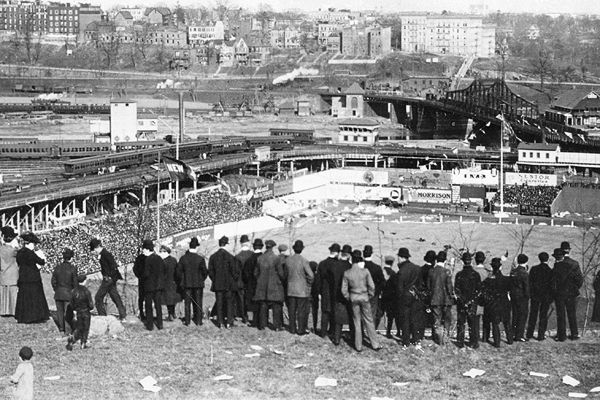
Fans watch Merkle's Boner from Coogan's Bluff, September 23, 1908

Tinker, Evers, and Chance first appeared in a game together on September 13, 1902. They turned their first double play on September 15, 1902. Lowe's injury did not properly heal during the off-season, making Evers the new permanent second baseman for the Cubs in 1903. Chance succeeded Selee as manager during the 1905 season when Selee became ill.

The Cubs, led by Tinker, Evers, and Chance, won the National League pennant in 1906, 1907, 1908, and 1910. In 1908 the Cubs clinched the pennant after defeating the Giants, in part due to Merkle's Boner. In the Merkle game, Tinker hit a home run off Christy Mathewson, and Evers alerted umpire Hank O'Day to Merkle's base-running gaffe. In the replay of the Merkle game, Tinker hit a triple off Mathewson that started the rally that gave the Cubs the victory, clinching the pennant.

From 1906 to 1910, the Cubs turned 491 double plays, the third most in the NL during that time. According to Bill James' "expected double plays" formula, the Cubs led the NL with 50 more double plays than expected during those five seasons. From 1906 through 1910, the "Tinker, to Evers, to Chance" double play happened 54 times in 770 games played, and the trio did not collaborate on a double play during any of their 21 World Series games. In 1906, the trio committed 194 errors, though this was in part due to poor field conditions and scorers.

=== Composition ===
Franklin Pierce Adams wrote a weekly column for the New York Evening Mail called "Always in Good Humor". Adams hoped to leave work to attend a Giants game, but his editor found that Adams had not produced enough content for his column. While reflecting on Tinker, Evers, and Chance as he traveled to the Polo Grounds to see the Giants play the Cubs, Adams wrote the poem that would become Baseball's Sad Lexicon. He considered the lines to be forgettable as he wrote them, and an editor at the paper told him that he did not consider the work to be "much good".

This work was first published as "That Double Play Again" in the New York Evening Mail on July 12, 1910 (not on July 10 as numerous sources state). The Chicago Daily Tribune reprinted it as "Gotham's Woe" on July 15, 1910. Three days later, on July 18, the New York Evening Mail republished it under the title by which it is best known today, "Baseball's Sad Lexicon." The poem was such a hit that other sportswriters submitted additional verses.

For the poem's 100th anniversary, Tim Wiles, director of research at the Baseball Hall of Fame, conducted research on the poem. He revealed that the poem was part of series of poems published in the New York Evening Mail and the Chicago Tribune. During the research process, combing the archives in the New York Public Library and the Center for Research Libraries, they uncovered 29 poems, 15 of which detail a specific play or game that had occurred during the 1910 season, with "Baseball's Sad Lexicon" the first poem published.

== After publication ==
In 1911, the Giants overcame the Cubs, capturing the first of three consecutive National League pennants. The trio played their final game together on April 12, 1912. While Chance was hospitalized for a brain injury suffered while playing, club owner Charles Webb Murphy released him after an argument about Murphy's releasing other players with high salaries. Murphy named Evers manager for the 1913 season, which displeased Tinker, who was traded to the Cincinnati Reds.

Murphy fired Evers as manager after one season, trading him against his will to the Boston Braves in February 1914. As a consequence, National League president John K. Tener and newspaper owner Charles P. Taft (who also owned the Philadelphia Phillies) made a successful effort to drive Murphy out of baseball. Taft purchased the Cubs from Murphy in 1914. Sporting Life commemorated the affair with this variation on the poem:

Brought to the leash and smashed in the jaw,
Evers to Tener to Taft.
Hounded and hustled outside of the law,
Evers to Tener to Taft.
Torn from the Cubs and the glitter of gold,
Stripped of the guerdons and glory untold,
Kicked in the stomach and cut from the fold,
Evers to Tener to Taft.

— "C. Murphy – His Lyric," Sporting Life, Mar. 14, 1914, p. 12.

== Impact and legacy ==
Chance died in 1924, Evers in 1947, and Tinker in 1948. The poem was regularly used to memorialize each of the players after his death.

All three players were inducted into the National Baseball Hall of Fame in 1946. Their inductions have been credited in part to the fame generated by Adams' poem. Andy Coakley, a teammate with the Cubs as well as a coach for Columbia University, regarded Tinker, Evers, and Chance to be the best infield (Note: Harry Steinfeldt played third base with the trio from 1906 to 1910.) in baseball history. Bill James, in his 1994 book, Whatever Happened to the Hall of Fame?, argued that Tinker was less accomplished than George Davis, who at the time was not a member of the Hall of Fame. (Note: Davis was elected to the Hall of Fame in 1998.)

The poem gave the trio "everlasting fame". Evers made an appearance on Information Please, a radio show on which Adams was a panelist in 1938. Evers thanked Adams for writing the poem, which he credited for his being remembered. However, many forgot Harry Steinfeldt, the third baseman who started alongside Tinker, Evers, and Chance from 1906 through 1910. Including Steinfeldt, the Cubs infield set a record for longevity surpassed by the Los Angeles Dodgers infield of first baseman Steve Garvey, second baseman Davey Lopes, shortstop Bill Russell, and third baseman Ron Cey, who played together for eight years, from 1973 through 1981.

Despite their celebrated success at turning spectacular plays in collaboration, relations between the teammates were said to have been often strained. Tinker and Evers feuded for many years. On September 14, 1905, Tinker and Evers engaged in a fistfight on the field because Evers had taken a cab to the stadium and left his teammates behind in the hotel lobby. They did not speak for years following this event. According to some tellings, Tinker and Evers did not speak to one another again following their fight for 33 years, until they were asked to participate in the radio broadcast of the 1938 World Series, between the Cubs and the New York Yankees. Neither Tinker nor Evers knew the other had been invited. However, in 1929, Tinker joined Evers in signing a ten-week contract to perform a theatrical skit on baseball in different cities across the United States.

== In popular culture ==
=== As a metaphor for teamwork or precision ===
The phrase "Tinker to Evers to Chance," and variations using other names, have been colloquially used to characterize high-caliber teamwork. Examples include:

- The song "O'Brien to Ryan to Goldberg" in the 1949 musical film Take Me Out to the Ball Game
- In a 1966 episode of Hogan's Heroes titled "The Safecracker Suite", after Corporal Newkirk bypasses Colonel Klink to toss Colonel Hogan an envelope containing secret plans, Hogan remarks to Klink, "Tinker to Evers to Chance is the play. You're only Evers, I'm Chance."
- In an episode of the 1970s TV series, The Brady Bunch, Alice, the housekeeper, refers to Greg, Peter and Bobby as "Tinker to Evers to Chance" as the boys enter the kitchen after a baseball game.
- An advertisement for The Hours, a 2003 film, praising the trio of Nicole Kidman, Meryl Streep, and Julianne Moore as the "acting version" of the three baseball players

The poem's title has also been used to characterize any process that happens with smoothness and precision, as a near-synonym to expressions such as "like clockwork" or "a well-oiled machine." For example:

- In Raymond Chandler's The Long Goodbye (1953), detective Philip Marlowe goes through his mail, opens it, and tosses it into the waste bin, remarking, "Mail slot to desk to wastebasket, Tinker to Evers to Chance."
- The Washington Post journalists Carl Bernstein and Bob Woodward used the phrase "Tinker to Evers to Chance" in their account of the Post investigation of the Watergate scandal in their 1974 book, All the President's Men. The reference described the smooth operation of President Richard Nixon's White House staff in responding to allegations of misconduct.

=== Other references ===
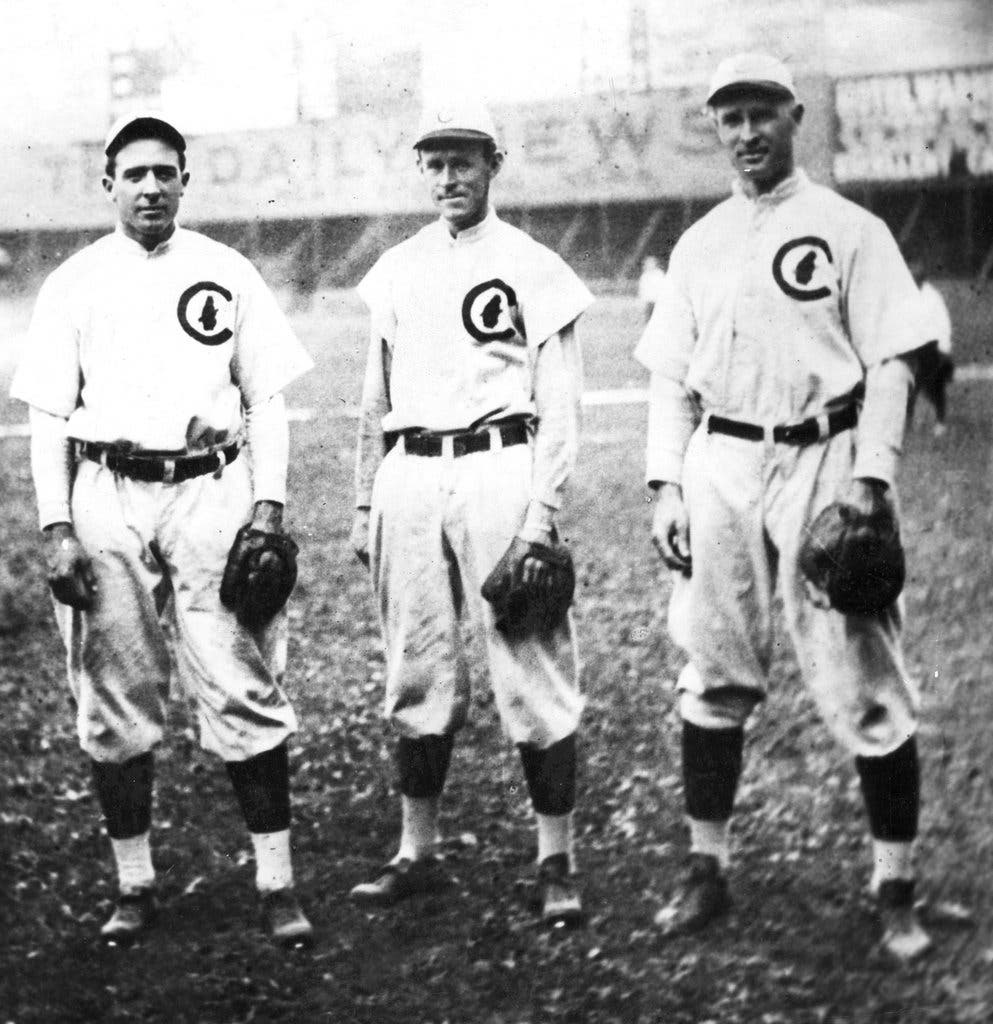
Tinker, Evers, and Chance

Ogden Nash, in his 1949 poem "Line-Up For Yesterday: An ABC of Baseball Immortals," referred to the trio of players in a stanza for the letter "E":

E is for Evers
His jaw in advance;
Never afraid
To Tinker with Chance.

Walt Kelly, in the May 7, 1953 installment of the Pogo comic strip, depicted the character Simple J. Malarkey (a caricature of Senator Joseph McCarthy) advising a preacher that the Constitution "can't guarantee what happens after you speak up... it don't pay to tinker forever with chance, ha ha like the fella says."

Musician Scott Miller, leader of the 1980s band Game Theory, chose Tinker to Evers to Chance as the ironic title of a 1990 compilation album of the band's greatest would-be hits which, despite significant critical acclaim, had struck out commercially. Like Nash, Miller emphasized the double meaning of the names, creating a visual pun by featuring a piece from a Tinkertoy set ("tinker"), a pocket watch ("evers"), and a die ("chance") on the album cover.

The poem was set to music and recorded in 2010 by Chicago singer/songwriter guitarist Chris McCaughan. The song, also titled "Baseball's Sad Lexicon," appears on the album We Chase the Waves by McCaughan's solo project, Sundowner.

== See also ==
- "Casey at the Bat"
