= Unicornography =

Studio album by the Falcon
- Released: September 26, 2006
- Recorded: January–February 2006
- Genres: Rock, punk rock
- Length: 28:02
- Label: Red Scare Industries
- Producers: Matt Allison, Dan Andriano, and Brendan Kelly

The Falcon chronology
God Don't Make No Trash (2004)	Unicornography (2006)	Gather Up the Chaps (2016)

Unicornography is the critically acclaimed debut album by the Chicago-based punk rock supergroup the Falcon which was released on September 26, 2006 in the United States. The album contains elements from modern rock and punk, as well as reintroducing some of the ska flavour from Kelly and Andriano's previous band, Slapstick.

The guitar on the album was supposed to be played by former guitarist of Rise Against, Todd Mohney. He was the guitarist on the EP but he could not attend the recording session for Unicornography due to other commitments. Band members Brendan Kelly and drummer Neil Hennessy took over Mohney's role on the album.

== Critical reception ==
Professional ratings
Review scores
Source	Rating
AllMusic	4/5 stars
Artistdirect.com	4/5 stars
Aversion.com	3/5 stars
Punknews.org	4.5/5 stars
Readjunk.com	3.5/5 stars

The album got favorable reviews from many sites with AllMusic describing the band as "experts at fly-by-the-seat-of-your-pants punk -- it takes skill to make music this great seem so easy to do."

Punknews.org went as far as saying "Sometimes hype is justified, as the Falcon have clearly proven. Maybe the ultimate "feel-good" album of 2006." Meanwhile some reviews are a bit more scathing, Aversion.com said "With the departure of Rise Against guitarist Todd Mahoney (sic.) from the lineup, The Falcon comes off sounding more like the Lawrence Arms' kid brother instead of a stand-alone act"

== Track listing ==
1. "The Angry Cry of the Angry Pie" – 1:54
2. "Blackout" – 3:03
3. "The La-Z-Boy 500" - 2:53
4. "The Celebutard Chronicles" – 2:11
5. "Little Triggers" – 2:33
6. "The Routes We Wander" – 2:42
7. "The Longshoreman's Lament" – 1:23
8. "Unicorn Odyssey" – 2:39
9. "R.L. Burnouts Inc." – 2:22
10. "Building the Even More Perfect Asshole Parade" – 2:36
11. "When I Give the Signal, Run!" – 3:46

== Performers ==
- Brendan Kelly - Vocals, guitar
- Dan Andriano - Bass, vocals
- Neil Hennessy - Drums, guitar

== Album information ==
- Record label: Red Scare Industries
- Recorded January – February 2006 at Atlas Studios
- Engineered and produced by Neil Henessey, assisted by Matt Allison, Brendan Kelly, Dan Andriano and Andy Gallas
- Mastered at the Bolier Room by Collin Jordan
- All songs by Brendan Kelly and the Falcon
- Additional vocals by Tobias Jeg
- Cover art by Heather Gabel
- Layout by John Reid
