= Metropole (album) =

2014 studio album by the Lawrence Arms

Studio album by The Lawrence Arms
- Released: January 28, 2014
- Recorded: June–September 2013
- Genre: Punk rock
- Length: 34:26
- Label: Epitaph Records
- Producer: Matt Allison; The Lawrence Arms

The Lawrence Arms chronology
Buttsweat and Tears (2009)	Metropole (2014)	We Are the Champions of the World (2018)

Professional ratings
Aggregate scores
Source	Rating
Metacritic	77/100
Review scores
Source	Rating
AllMusic	4/5 stars
Exclaim!	8/10

Metropole is the sixth studio album from the punk band The Lawrence Arms. The record was released by Epitaph Records on January 28, 2014. Also released on the same date, as part of limited edition pre-order bundles, was the 7" vinyl-exclusive EP News From Yalta, which features three tracks from the same recording sessions that did not end up making it into the main release of Metropole. However, the digital Deluxe Edition (available on iTunes, Amazon, and so on) does include these 3 tracks in Metropole itself, numbering them tracks 13–15.

The album's lead single, "You Are Here", was released on November 18, 2013. A music video for Seventeener (17th and 37th) premiered on January 4, 2014.

Lawrence Arms bassist Brendan Kelly said in an interview with Noisey that during a trip to Italy he stayed at Hotel Metropole, which inspired the name of the album. He said many of the sound bites between the songs were recorded using his iPhone while he was in Italy. The clips themselves showcase various types of street musicians and other urban sounds to convey the album's theme of life in a city.

== Track listing ==
All tracks are written by The Lawrence Arms.

No.	Title	Length
1.	"Chilean District"	1:22
2.	"You are Here"	2:44
3.	"Hickey Avenue"	3:33
4.	"Seventeener (17th and 37th)"	2:45
5.	"Beautiful Things"	3:02
6.	"Acheron River"	3:27
7.	"Metropole"	2:58
8.	"Drunk Tweets"	1:25
9.	"The YMCA Down the Street From the Clinic"	3:49
10.	"Never Fade Away"	2:02
11.	"Paradise Shitty"	4:18
12.	"October Blood"	3:01

iTunes Deluxe Edition
No.	Title	Length
13.	"These Pigs Seem to be Getting the Best of Me"	2:31
14.	"Bonfire Park"	3:01
15.	"The Profiteers"	3:00

== Personnel ==
- Chris McCaughan – guitar, vocals
- Brendan Kelly – bass, vocals
- Neil Hennessy – drums
