= Neon Fiction =

2013 Album by Sundowner

Studio album by Sundowner
- Released: September 3, 2013
- Genres: Acoustic; Folk punk
- Length: 34:04
- Label: Fat Wreck Chords

Sundowner chronology
We Chase the Waves (2010)	Neon Fiction (2013)

Neon Fiction is the third album by Chicago's Sundowner, the acoustic side-project from Chris McCaughan of The Lawrence Arms.

== Reception ==
Professional ratings
Review scores
Source	Rating
AllMusic	3.5/5 stars
Punknews.org	4/5 stars

Bryne Yancey of Punknews.org rated the album four stars, describing it as Sundowner's "the strongest entry". AllMusic's Gregory Heaney referred to it as "an album that's perfect for moments of lonely contemplation away from the brash drive of the Lawrence Arms."

== Track listing ==
Neon Fiction track listing
No.	Title	Length
1.	"Cemetery West"	3:47
2.	"My Beautiful Ruins"	4:26
3.	"Concrete Shoes"	3:25
4.	"We Drift Eternal"	3:00
5.	"Grey on Grey"	2:22
6.	"Life in the Embers"	3:03
7.	"Origins"	1:44
8.	"Paper Rose City"	4:30
9.	"Poet of Trash"	4:10
10.	"Wildfires"	3:37
Total length:		38:44
