= Honor system (disambiguation) =

An honor system or honesty system is a system by which parties in an interaction are expected to honor trust granted to them by other parties.

Honor system may also refer to:

- The Honor System (band), a Chicago-based punk rock group
- The Honor System (film), a 1917 film by Raoul Walsh
- Academic honor code, or honor system

== See also ==
- Honours system
- Category:Honours systems
