= Shady View Terrace / The Lawrence Arms =

EP by Shady View Terrace and The Lawrence Arms
- Released: 2000
- Genre: Punk rock, emo
- Label: Castaway Records, Asian Man Records

The Lawrence Arms chronology
Ghost Stories (2000)	Shady View Terrace / The Lawrence Arms (2000)	Present Day Memories (2001)

Shady View Terrace / The Lawrence Arms split EP is a 2000 punk rock EP by the Branchville, New Jersey band Shady View Terrace and the Chicago, Illinois band The Lawrence Arms. It was originally released in 2000 by Castaway Records on CD format, and was re-released later that same year by Asian Man Records. Both are currently out of print, however all of the Lawrence Arms tracks have been reissued on the B-sides album Cocktails & Dreams.

== Background ==
Paul of Castaway Records contacted The Lawrence arms and asked them if they wanted to do a split. It was the label's first release, and he paid for them to record. It marks the first time The Lawrence Arms recorded with Matt Allison, who they would go on to record with for all their other releases. On the other half of the split was the New Jersey emo band, Shady View Terrace. They mixed emotional lyrics about failed relationships with clean and screaming vocals. Castaway Records soon fell apart, and Asian Man Records re-released it. The artwork was designed by math-nerd Ricardo Saporta.

== Track listing ==
Side 1: Shady View Terrace

1. "I Hope You're Alone"
2. "Guardrails Can't Keep Me In"
3. "The Way She Felt"
4. "Fatt"
5. "Quiet Rides and Birthday Cards"
6. "Kissing a Memory"

Side 2: The Lawrence Arms

1. "A Boring Story"
2. "Faintly Falling Ashes"
3. "A Toast"
4. "Nebraska"
5. "Another Boring Story"

== Performers ==
Shady View Terrace

- Billy McGovern - vocals
- Chris Lecko - guitar, vocals
- Mike Gratcofsky - guitar
- Joe Gratcofsky - bass
- Paul Jaffre - drums

The Lawrence Arms

- Chris McCaughan - guitar, vocals
- Brendan Kelly - bass, vocals
- Neil Hennessy - drums

== Album information ==
- Record label: Castaway Records, Asian Man Records
- The Lawrence Arms tracks recorded at Atlas Studios on June 21 and June 22, 2000. Produced by Matt Allison
- Shady View Terrace recorded tracks 1, 5, and 6 in June 2000. Tracks 2, 3, and 4 were recorded at NADA studios in December, 1999. Produced by John Naclerio and Shady View Terrace.
