= A Guided Tour of Chicago =

Studio album by the Lawrence Arms
- Released: October 26, 1999
- Recorded: Spring 1999
- Genre: Punk rock
- Length: 26:07
- Label: Asian Man

The Lawrence Arms chronology
A Guided Tour of Chicago (1999)	Ghost Stories (2000)

Professional ratings
Review scores
Source	Rating
AllMusic	3/5 stars
Sputnikmusic	3.0/5

A Guided Tour of Chicago is the debut album by the Chicago, Illinois, band the Lawrence Arms, released in 1999 by Asian Man Records.

At this early point in their career, several of the band's songs resembled those of their previous band The Broadways, being political in nature (such as "Kevin Costner's Casino"), something which they later almost completely phased out in favor of personal/introspective lyrics. Singer/bassist Brendan Kelly sings almost all of the lead vocals on this album, whereas on later works he and singer/guitarist Chris McCaughan moved towards singing lead on roughly equal numbers of songs; and on Oh! Calcutta! tended to share vocal duties within songs, by singing together and/or alternating lines. The album was recorded in one day at Scientific Recordings by Mike Giampa and Andy. The album was never properly mixed due to the band running out of money while recording it. Although loved by hardcore fans, Brendan Kelly has stated that this is his least favorite Lawrence Arms album, calling it "a terrible representation of our band." The album was released on vinyl for the first time in 2009 on Asian Man Records, with all new artwork.

== Song information ==
"An Evening of Extraordinary Circumstance" was the first song ever written for the band. Brendan Kelly wrote it while on a bus. It was written at a time when he didn't have a band or any direction, and was feeling completely helpless. Kelly has stated that the song still sums up some of his deepest resentments towards himself. He also stated that it's his favorite song on the album. They used the title of this song to be the name of their live tenth anniversary show DVD, released on Fat Wreck Chords. A homemade music video was made for the song. It consisted of random shots of Chicago and the band. It was released on the Asian Man Records DVD, 10 Minutes to Ogikubo Station. It was also released on the live DVD of the same name on Fat Wreck Chords. It remains the only song from the album regularly included in their live act. "Kevin Costner's Casino" is about actor, Kevin Costner buying land that belonged to the Lakota People in Deadwood, South Dakota, to add extensions to his casinos. "A Guided Tour of Chicago" is an ode to the homeless people living in Chicago. "Take One Down and Pass It Around" is about drinking and gambling. "Someday We're All Gonna Weigh 400 Ibs" is about technology taking over human interaction, written from a satirical viewpoint. "The Northside, the L&L, and Any Number of Crappy Apartments" mentions the L&L Tavern in its title, which is a bar located in Chicago. The song is about questioning the lifestyle they were living at the time. "Smokestacks" is a song about the environment, and thinking that nature will soon be replaced by smokestacks, concrete, and power plants. "Detention" was about a crazy dream that Brendan had. "Uptown Free Radio" is a reference to the apartment that Chris and Brendan lived in. On certain days they could hear local music being played across the street, from their porch. "Eighteen Inches" is an introspective anthem about the harsh winters in Chicago, and the hypocrisy of pontification.

== Track listing ==
1. "Intro" – 0:04
2. "An Evening of Extraordinary Circumstance" – 2:57
3. "Kevin Costner's Casino" – 1:45
4. "A Guided Tour of Chicago" – 2:43
5. "Take One Down and Pass it Around" – 1:46
6. "Someday We're All Gonna Weigh 400 lbs." – 1:59
7. "The Northside, the L&L, and Any Number of Crappy Apartments" – 3:12
8. "Smokestacks" – 2:14
9. "Detention" – 2:09
10. "Uptown Free Radio" – 1:44
11. "Eighteen Inches" – 5:59

== Performers ==
- Chris McCaughan – guitar, co-lead vocals on #7
- Brendan Kelly – bass, lead vocals
- Neil Hennessy – drums

== Album information ==
- Record label: Asian Man Records
- Recorded spring of 1999 by Mike Giampa and Andy (83)
- Photographs by Heather Hogan, Rachel Burns, Grant Quick, Brendan Kelly and Neil Hennessy
- Logo by Chris Bach
- Drawing by Marc Z
