= Jenny Choi =

American singer and cellist

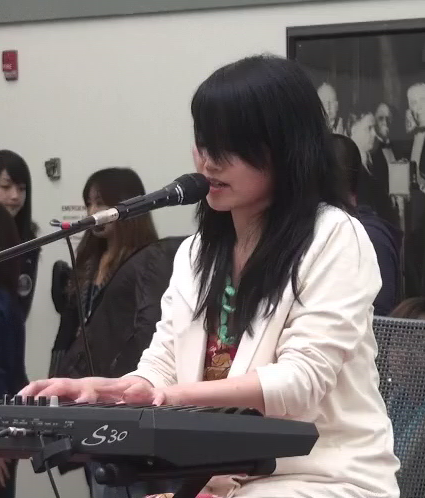
Jenny Choi

Jenny Choi is an American singer and cellist, who founded the Asians in Rock tour, and is the lead singer of the two-piece Chicago band, Sanawon. For many years she performed solo at the University of Illinois at Urbana–Champaign (where she received her undergraduate degree) as well as with a back-up band. She also played synthesizer and sang lead and backing vocals in the short-lived Sweet Black And Blue, with Philip Stone on drums and Ben Weasel at guitar and microphone. She played cello on Mike Park's second album North Hangook Falling, The Lawrence Arms fifth album Oh! Calcutta! and the debut album Four One Five Two by their guitarist Chris McCaughan as part of his side project Sundowner, and contributed vocals to three songs on This Is Me Smiling's first album.

== Solo discography ==
- Postcard Stories (2003 · Double Zero Records)

Jenny Choi and the Third Shift:

- Grand and Ashland (2001 · Ona Records)
- Bittersweet (1998 · Ona Records)
