= L&L Tavern =

Bar in Chicago

L & L Tavern
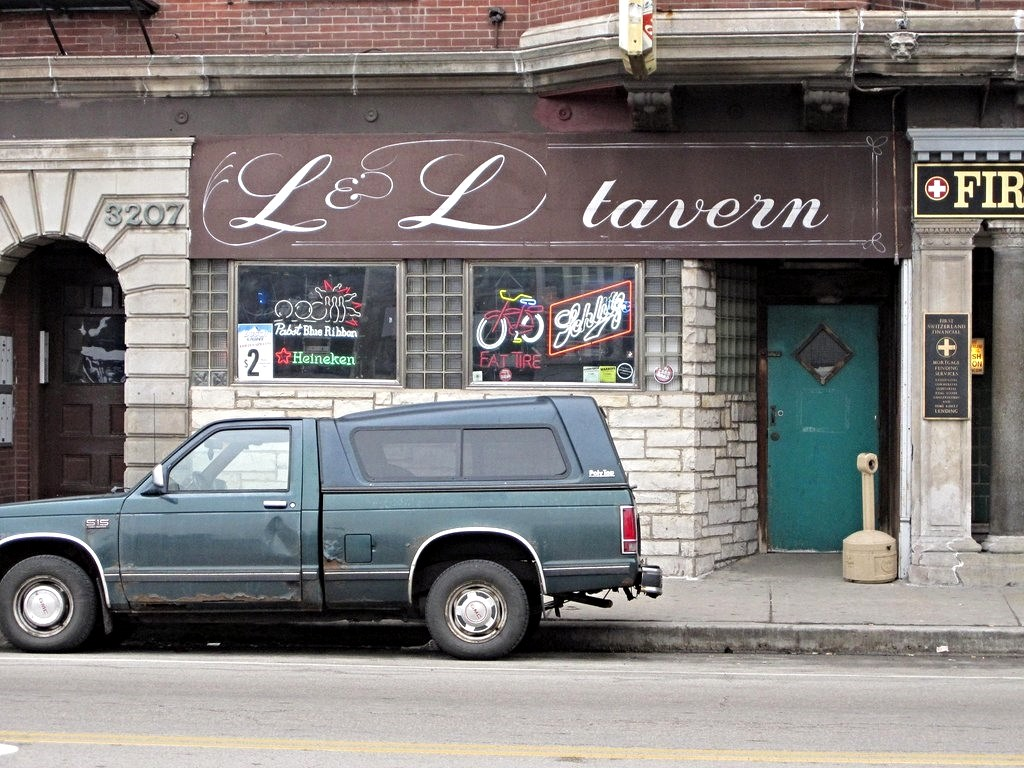
- Interactive map of L & L Tavern
- Address: 3207 N. Clark Street, Lakeview; Chicago; USA
- Coordinates: 41°56′25.25″N 87°39′0.87″W

L & L Tavern is a bar at 3207 N. Clark Street (at Belmont Avenue), in the Lakeview neighborhood in Chicago. It was named one of the best dive bars in the country by Stuff Magazine.

When it opened was by Paul Gillon in the 1950s, the bar was called the Columbia Tavern & Liquors. Its current name comes from prior owners Lefty (John Miller) and Lauretta. It is currently owned by Ken Frandsen.

The bar is rumored to have been visited by serial killers Jeffrey Dahmer and John Wayne Gacy, the latter being said to have worn a full clown outfit there during the 1970s.

== In popular culture ==
- Interviews in the tavern feature substantially in Against Me!'s We're Never Going Home.
- A song on Lawrence Arms' A Guided Tour of Chicago (1999) is entitled "The Northside, the L&L, and Any Number of Crappy Apartments."
- Anthony Bourdain visited the bar for his Travel Channel series The Layover (Season 2, Episode 1 "Chicago").
- The bar was a shooting location for the HBO series Lovecraft Country.
