= Gather Up the Chaps =

Studio album by The Falcon
- Released: March 18, 2016
- Recorded: 2015
- Genre: Punk rock
- Length: 25:58
- Label: Red Scare Industries

The Falcon chronology
Unicornography (2006)	Gather Up the Chaps (2016)

Professional ratings
Review scores
Source	Rating
Punknews.org	4/5 stars

Gather Up the Chaps is the second studio album by the Chicago-based punk rock supergroup The Falcon which was released by Red Scare Industries on March 18, 2016, almost ten years after their debut album Unicornography.

== Track listing ==
1. The Trash - 2:12
2. War of Colossus - 1:42
3. Sergio's Here - 2:09
4. The Skeleton Dance - 2:42
5. Hasselhoff Cheeseburger - 2:05
6. Dead Rose - 2:25
7. The Fighter, The Rube, The Asshole - 1:56
8. If Dave Did It - 1:50
9. Sailor's Grave - 2:33
10. Glue Factory - 1:53
11. You Dumb Dildos - 2:37
12. Black Teeth - 1:54

== Performers ==
- Brendan Kelly – vocals, guitar
- Neil Hennessy – drums, backing vocals
- Dan Andriano – bass, backing vocals, lead vocals on #11
- Dave Hause – guitar, backing vocals, lead vocals on #8
