= We Chase the Waves =

Studio album by Sundowner
- Released: August 3, 2010
- Genre: Acoustic; Folk punk
- Length: 30:20
- Label: Asian Man

Sundowner chronology
Four One Five Two (2007)	We Chase the Waves (2010)	Neon Fiction (2013)

We Chase the Waves is the second album by Chicago's Sundowner, the acoustic side-project from Chris McCaughan of The Lawrence Arms. The album was released on August 3, 2010.

== Reception ==
Professional ratings
Review scores
Source	Rating
Punknews.org	3/5 stars
PopMatters	6/10 stars

Joe Pelone of Punknews rated the album three stars and stated, "The album isn't perfect--a few of the songs meander--but it's still a modest success all the same." PopMatters assigned it a rating of six out of ten, noting that it has "a lush, layered vibe, with doubled vocals and rich reverb-dappled tones that breed a more intimate experience than the post-Jawbreaker rock of their main gig."

== Track listing ==
We Chase the Waves track listing
No.	Title	Length
1.	"In the Flicker"	3:31
2.	"Araby"	3:00
3.	"Whales and Sharks"	2:56
4.	"As the Crow Flies"	4:16
5.	"Baseball's Sad Lexicon"	1:36
6.	"All Prologue"	2:15
7.	"Mouth of a Tiger"	4:33
8.	"Second Hand"	1:44
9.	"Jewel of the Midwest"	3:29
10.	"What Beadie Said"	3:00
Total length:		30:20

== Personnel ==
- Chris McCaughan (vocals, acoustic guitars)
