= Slapstick (band) =

American punk-ska fusion band

- Origin: Elgin, Illinois, U.S.
- Genres: Punk rock, ska punk
- Years active: 1993–1996, periodic reunion performances thereafter
- Label: Asian Man
- Members: Brendan Kelly; Dan Andriano; Dan Hanaway; Matt Stamps; Rob Kellenberger; Peter Anna; Karl Henkelmann Wayne Jackson

Slapstick is an American Ska Punk band from Elgin, Illinois that was primarily active from 1993 to 1996. Started by a group of friends, they took inspiration from Operation Ivy and the guttural punk vocals of Crimpshrine. Though the band had made the decision to break up a couple of weeks beforehand, their original final show was October 5, 1996 at the Metro with Less Than Jake and Skankin' Pickle. Since disbanding, Slapstick has periodically reunited to perform shows for various reasons, including benefits and anniversaries. The band is known for being the root of the "Slapstick Family Tree", a group of musical projects which spawned from members of Slapstick, including Alkaline Trio, the Lawrence Arms, the Broadways, Tuesday, Duvall, Colossal, the Honor System and the Falcon.

== Members ==
=== Final members ===
- Brendan Kelly: vocals
- Dan Andriano: bass, backing vocals
- Dan Hanaway: trumpet, backing vocals
- Matt Stamps: guitar
- Rob Kellenberger: drums, backing vocals
- Peter Anna: trombone

=== Former members ===
- Karl Henkelmann: trumpet
- Aaron Flaks: trombone

== Releases ==
They have 2 full-length releases: the album Lookit! was released on Mike Park's now-defunct Dill Records, and later on his next and still-active label Asian Man Records; and a self-titled compilation (also referred to as 25 Songs or Discography) was released on Asian Man, featuring the songs from Lookit!, a few unreleased songs, and 6 new songs that were intended to be released on a 10" record had the band not split.

Prior to the release of these albums, the band had released two 7" vinyl EPs: Superhero, which came in various colours of vinyl and with two different covers; and Crooked, which featured 4 songs later released on Lookit! (and by extension the eponymous compilation). Superhero was originally self-released, and later repressed and released alongside Crooked on Dyslexic Records. A few songs were released exclusively on now out-of-print compilations, and thus remain unavailable. The band also released a split with Tommyrot, and a few demo tapes containing otherwise unreleased songs. Thus, the self-titled 'discography' is not technically a complete collection.

== Breakup and legacy ==
=== Reason ===
Slapstick broke up because we couldn't write songs together anymore. Dan (Hanaway) or I would bring a song in and Matt, Danny and Rob wouldn't like it. Conversely, those three would bring in songs and Dan and I wouldn't like them. The creative process stagnated. it has a lot to do with the fact that none of us really ever liked ska a lot. It was a phase for all of us and once we got through the phase, writing ska became hard to do (not to mention silly). We had different ideas about what direction Slapstick should go, and there was no other resolution. We are all still great friends though.

- Brendan Kelly

=== Subsequent projects by members ===
The members of Slapstick went on to form a number of notable groups. Andriano, Stamps and Kellenberger formed Tuesday. Likewise, Kelly and Hanaway formed the Broadways with Rob DePaola and Tricky Dick guitarist Chris McCaughan. When Tuesday broke up in 1999, Andriano further focused his efforts on the Alkaline Trio, who he had joined in late 1997. The Broadways broke up in late 1998, after which Kelly and McCaughan started the still-active the Lawrence Arms, and a little later Hanaway and DePaola formed the Honor System. In 2004, Kelly and Andriano collaborated once again in the Chicago supergroup the Falcon. Kellenberger later formed Colossal, and briefly played with the Smoking Popes. Trombonist Pete Anna played in Less Than Jake from 1998 to 2001.

After years of refusing, and occasionally mocking, fans' requests to play songs from their old bands, the Lawrence Arms performed Slapstick's "Broken Down" and songs by the Broadways at the Asian Man Records 11th anniversary show. They also performed these songs on their 2007 tour, in which their own side-projects, Sundowner and the Falcon, served as support acts; this was probably to somewhat round out the 'family tree' aspect of these shows.

=== Reunions ===
On November 23, 1997, Slapstick reunited for two final shows at the Fireside Bowl in Chicago. They were benefit shows, both selling out. In June 2006, Asian Man Records released a DVD of the second show. It also features optional video commentary by Brendan Kelly and Rob Kellenberger.

On June 15, 2011, all the original members of Slapstick reunited at Slim's in San Francisco, for the Asian Man Records 15th Anniversary Festival. After two other reunited Asian Man Records bands – the Chinkees and MU330 – opened, Slapstick played an hour-long set, constantly poking fun at how old they were, how little they like to play ska, and how they were "uh, Slapstick, I guess". Many fans requested Lawrence Arms songs from Kelly, who said this was like his wife asking him to put his pants back on. Late in the set, a drunken Matt Skiba of fellow Chicago punk rock band Alkaline Trio joined Slapstick on stage, slurring, gushing, giving hugs to all the band members, and even engaging in drunken humour at risk of misinterpretation.

In May 2012, frontman Brendan Kelly announced on his personal site that Slapstick would again be reuniting, this time to perform at Riot Fest Chicago later that year.
