= Cocktails & Dreams =

Compilation album by The Lawrence Arms
- Released: June 21, 2005
- Recorded: May 2000–2005
- Genre: Punk rock
- Length: 1:02:17
- Label: Asian Man Records

The Lawrence Arms chronology
The Greatest Story Ever Told (2003)	Cocktails & Dreams (2005)	Oh! Calcutta! (2006)

Professional ratings
Review scores
Source	Rating
Allmusic	link

Cocktails & Dreams is an album of B-Sides and rarities by the Chicago punk rock band The Lawrence Arms, released in 2005 by Asian Man Records. It collects the songs from their two Asian Man EPs, songs from several compilations and a few new songs.

== Track listing ==
1. "Intransit" - 1:59
2. "Quincentuple Your Money" - 3:01
3. "100 Resolutions" - 3:31
4. "There's No Place Like a Stranger's Floor" - 3:24
5. "Hey, What Time Is 'Pensacola: Wings of Gold' on Anyway?" - 4:19
6. "Presenting: The Dancing Machine (The Robot with the Monkey Head)" - 1:27
7. "Overheated" - 4:20
8. "Necrotism: Decanting the Insalubrious (Cyborg Midnight) Part 7" - 1:49
9. "A Boring Story" - 3:02
10. "Faintly Falling Ashes" - 1:20
11. "A Toast" - 2:36
12. "Nebraska" - 3:37
13. "Another Boring Story" - 3:00
14. "Joyce Carol Oates Is a Boring Old Biddy" - 3:28
15. "The Old Timer's 2×4" - 2:19
16. "Turnstiles" / "Old Mexico Way" / "Purple Haze" / "Heaven Help Me" - 19:05

== Performers ==
- Chris McCaughan - guitar, vocals
- Brendan Kelly - bass, vocals
- Neil Kevin Hennessy - drums

== Album information ==
- Record label: Asian Man Records
- Tracks 1, 15 & 16 recorded at Atlas Studios in early 2005 by Matt Allison
- Tracks 2–5 recorded at Atlas Studios in January 2001 by Matt Allison
- Track 7 recorded at Atlas Studios in October 2001 by Matt Allison
- Track 8 recorded at Atlas Studios in December 2003 by Matt Allison
- Tracks 9–13 recorded at Atlas Studios in May 2000 by Matt Allison
- Track 14 recorded in September 2002 in a Chicago oil factory by Chris Carr and Lance Reynolds
- "Old Mexico Way" recorded by Mike Giampa
- "Purple Haze" and "Heaven Help Me" recorded by the Lawrence Arms on home recording devices
- Layout by David Holtz
- Photos by the Lawrence Arms, Ben Pier and others

== Song information ==
- Tracks 2–5 originally appeared on the EP Present Day Memories, a split CD/EP with The Chinkees released in 2001 by Asian Man Records.
- Track 6 originally appeared on the compilation Fat Music, Vol. 6: Uncontrollable Fatulence, released in 2002 by Fat Wreck Chords. It was originally titled "Presenting: The Dancing Machine (Il Robot Con la Testa di Scimmia)."
- Track 7 is an outtake from the recording sessions for the band's third album Apathy and Exhaustion.
- Track 8 originally appeared on the compilation Rock Against Bush, Vol. 2, released in 2004 by Fat Wreck Chords. Its title "Necrotism: Decanting the Insalubrious (Cyborg Midnight) Part 7" is a direct reference to the band Carcass's third album Necroticism – Descanting the Insalubrious.
- Tracks 9–13 originally appeared on the Shady View Terrace / The Lawrence Arms split EP, which was originally released on vinyl EP by Castaway Records and re-released in 2000 on CD by Asian Man Records. Track 10, "Faintly Falling Ashes", is a re-recording of an earlier demo, which was then titled "Purple Haze" and is included in this album's final track (see below).
- Track 14 originally appeared on the compilation Oil: Chicago Punk Refined, released in 2002 by Thick Records. It was originally titled "Where Are You Going, Where Have You Been?", a name which is shared with a story by Joyce Carol Oates. In the liner notes Chris notes that the song was re-titled because "1) There's nothing more lame than to be asked if you've ripped off, or even worse, were paying homage to Joyce Carol Oates. 2) It's a stupid title that basically means nothing." It is one of the few songs the band has never played live.
- Tracks 15 & 16 are re-recordings of songs that originally appeared on the band's second album Ghost Stories.
- The final track is followed by the same hidden tracks that appeared on the album Ghost Stories, but in a different order. "Purple Haze" was later rerecorded as "Faintly Falling Ashes" (see above).

== Pseudonyms ==
In the liner notes and artwork Brendan and Chris identify themselves using the pseudonyms "Cocktails" and "Dreams," respectively. This echoes the use of pseudonyms they had used on their fourth album The Greatest Story Ever Told. "Cocktails and Dreams" was also the name of the bar that Tom Cruise's character dreamed of opening in the film Cocktail.
