= Ghost Stories (The Lawrence Arms album) =

Studio album by The Lawrence Arms
- Released: May 2, 2000
- Recorded: December 1999
- Genre: Punk rock
- Length: 41:40
- Label: Asian Man

The Lawrence Arms chronology
A Guided Tour of Chicago (1999)	Ghost Stories (2000)	Shady View Terrace / The Lawrence Arms split EP (2000)

Professional ratings
Review scores
Source	Rating
Punknews.org	4/5 stars
Allmusic	3.5/5 stars
Sputnikmusic	3.5/5 stars

Ghost Stories is a punk rock album by the Chicago, Illinois band The Lawrence Arms, released in 2000 by Asian Man Records. It was the band's second full-length album. With this release the band moved away from the political nature of some of their previous songs in favor of more introspective lyrics. Also, while singer/bassist Brendan Kelly had handled the majority of lead vocals on their previous album A Guided Tour of Chicago, on this album he and singer/guitarist Chris McCaughan split vocal duties almost equally. This singing style would continue throughout their next several albums, and eventually the two would begin to share lead vocals in an almost duet style on Oh Calcutta! It also features the only Lawrence Arms song written and sung by drummer Neil Hennessy, "106 South". The album was recorded at Scientific Studios in December 1999 by Mike Giampa. All of the drums were triggered, and the bass was recorded through a SansAmp. Accompanied by a heavily distorted guitar, this resulted in a very raw sounding album. It's loved by hardcore fans for its dark tones and lyrical themes. Brendan Kelly has stated that this is his second least favorite Lawrence Arms album, but called the cover his favorite. The album was released on vinyl for the first time in 2009 on Asian Man Records, with all new artwork.

== Song information ==
"Sixteen Hours" is about Brendan's health, and how he was so bummed that he smoked cigarettes. "Chicago is Burning" is an ode to Chicago, but criticizes the constant heavy pollution. Brendan Kelly once called "Turnstyles" the best Lawrence Arms song. It's one of the few songs from the earlier days that was still played live as the years went on. They re-recorded it for their 2005 compilation album, Cocktails & Dreams. "Asa Phelps is Dead" references a character from The Simpsons, named Asa Phelps. "The Old Timers 2x4" is about Brendan's relationship with his father. It was also re-recorded for Cocktails & Dreams. "Here Comes the Neighborhood" makes reference of tons of places in Chicago, like The Empty Bottle. It was also included on PopStache's list of "Chicago Theme Songs That Don't Suck". "Light Breathing (Me and Martha Plimpton in a Fancy Elevator)" is a true story. Chris ran into actress, Martha Plimpton in an elevator, but couldn't get the nerve to say anything to her. Though not to the extent of "Turnstyles", this song sometimes still appears in their live sets. "106 South" is the only song by the band that was written and sung by drummer, Neil Hennessy. He came in with the song completely done, and they decided to put it on the record. It also mentions The Simpsons. "The Last One" is often viewed as being one of the best songs by the band. It has three hidden tracks attached to it. "Old Mexico Way" and "Heaven Help Me" are satirically dark country songs. They feature Brendan Kelly singing in a slight country accent, but are often said to be some of the band's strongest tracks. Both were added as hidden tracks on the re-recorded version of "Turnstyles" on their compilation album, Cocktails & Dreams. "Purple Haze" and "Heaven Help Me" were recorded on home audio equipment by the band. "Purple Haze" was later renamed and recorded (in a full band arrangement) as "Faintly Falling Ashes" on their split with Shady View Terrace. All tracks from that split were also featured on their compilation album, Cocktails & Dreams.

== Track listing ==
1. "Sixteen Hours" - 1:07
2. "Chicago Is Burning" - 1:44
3. "Turnstyles" - 2:28
4. "Asa Phelps Is Dead" - 2:51
5. "All the Week" - 1:29
6. "The Old Timer's 2x4" - 2:10
7. "Here Comes the Neighborhood" - 1:55
8. "Light Breathing (Me and Martha Plimpton in a Fancy Elevator)" - 2:57
9. "Ghost Stories" - 2:34
10. "106 South" - 2:09
11. "Minute" - 1:06
12. "The Last One" / "Old Mexico Way" / "Purple Haze" / "Heaven Help Me" - 19:10

== Personnel ==
- Chris McCaughan - guitar, vocals
- Brendan Kelly - bass, vocals
- Neil Hennessy - drums, vocals on "106 South"

== Album information ==
- Record label: Asian Man Records
- Recorded at Scientific Studios in December 1999 by Mike Giampa
- Track engineering by Neil Hennessy
- Additional engineering by Jim Godsey
- Mastered by Harry Brotman at Harry's Sonic Bistro
- Logo and disc picture by Chris Bach
- Photography by Julia, Shannon and the Lawrence Arms
- Graphics production by MaximumMac Studios
