= The Fest =

American music festival

- The Fest logo
- Genre: Hardcore punk; emotional hardcore; melodic hardcore; post-hardcore; punk rock; indie rock; metalcore
- Dates: May, October, November
- Locations: Gainesville, Florida, U.S.
- Years active: 2002–present
- Founders: Tony Weinbender
- Attendance: ~4,000
- Organiser: No Idea Records
- Website: thefestfl.com

The Fest is an annual music festival in Gainesville, Florida, United States, which takes place on the weekend of the Florida–Georgia football game (around Halloween). Originally organized by Tony Weinbender, formerly of No Idea Records, it predominantly features punk rock, hardcore punk, and pop-punk artists, though there are also numerous indie rock, metalcore, metal, and ska bands.

== History ==
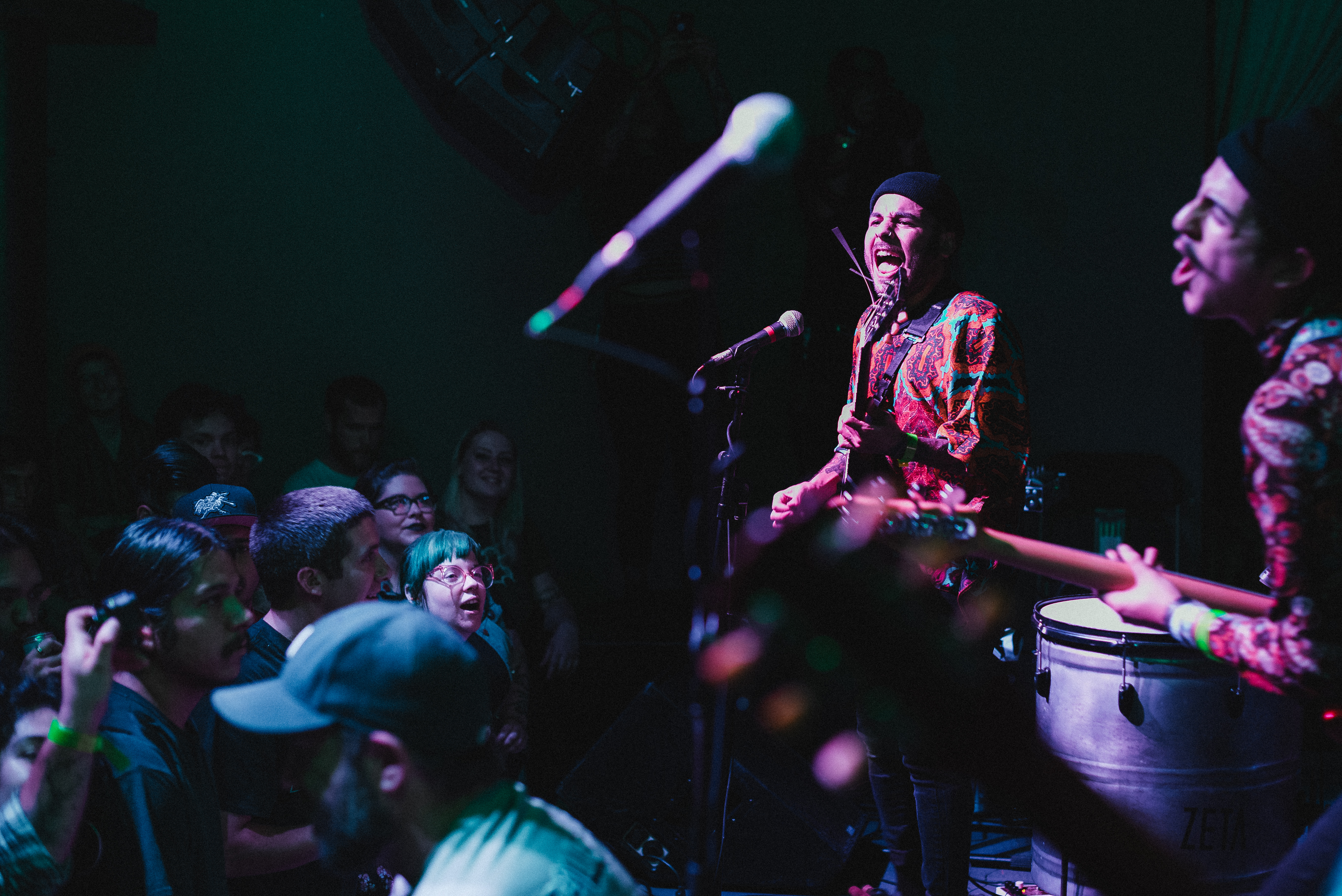
Live performance of Zeta at the Fest 17

The first The Fest festival took place on May 24–25, 2002, but starting with The Fest II, it was moved to the weekend of October 17–18, 2003.

It has since attracted a large turnout throughout the years. Bands perform across a variety of venues (varying from small bars to large concert halls) in the downtown Gainesville area.

Fest 20, held October 28-30, 2022, featured headlining acts such as Hot Water Music, The Menzingers, Anti-Flag, The Flatliners, Avail, and Samiam, as well as hundreds of other bands including Algernon Cadwallader, The Bollweevils, Celebration Summer, SPELLS, The Dopamines, Kali Masi, Heavy Seas, School Drugs and more.

== See also ==
- Fested: A Journey to Fest 7
- List of punk rock festivals
- List of historic rock festivals
