= The Greatest Story Ever Told (The Lawrence Arms album) =

Studio album by The Lawrence Arms
- Released: September 23, 2003
- Genre: Punk rock
- Length: 33:11
- Label: Fat Wreck Chords
- Producer: Matt Allison and The Lawrence Arms

The Lawrence Arms chronology
Apathy and Exhaustion (2002)	The Greatest Story Ever Told (2003)	Cocktails & Dreams (2005)

Professional ratings
Review scores
Source	Rating
Sputnikmusic	5/5 stars
Allmusic	4/5 stars
Punknews.org	4/5 stars

The Greatest Story Ever Told is the fourth studio album by the American punk rock band The Lawrence Arms, released in 2003 by Fat Wreck Chords. A concept album of sorts, it follows a linear storyline and has several songs which call back to or refer to others. The album includes extensive liner notes with footnotes to the lyrics that detail the many literary and pop culture references. Its title is a direct reference to the movie The Greatest Story Ever Told, a 1965 film about the life of Jesus.

According to bassist Brendan Kelly, the album's initial reception from Fat Wreck Chords and Fat Mike himself were overwhelmingly negative but changed into appreciation over time.

== Cultural references ==
In the liner notes and artwork the band members identify themselves under false names and as playing instruments not found on the album, specifically Gordon Shumway on vibraslap, Ivan Nikolayevich on harp and lyre, and Ferdinand Magellan on bassoon. The names are references to history, literature and pop culture:

- Ferdinand Magellan, the famous Portuguese explorer who circumnavigated the globe in 1519.
- Gordon Shumway, the full name of the fictional alien who was the main character of the 1980s television series ALF.
- Ivan Nikolayevich, a character in the novel The Master and Margarita by Mikhail Bulgakov. The novel is referenced in other areas of the album including the song "Chapter 13: The Hero Appears".

They also fictitiously list several other famous figures as "additional musicians", including musician John Oates, actors Bronson Pinchot and Ian Ziering, poet Ezra Pound and former President Chester A. Arthur.

=== The Master and Margarita ===
Russian author Mikhail Bulgakov's novel The Master and Margarita is referred to several times: the album has a song called "Chapter 13: The Hero Appears", named after the same chapter in the book; its liner notes name one of the band members (corresponding to guitarist Chris McCaughan) as Ivan Nikolayevich; the song "A Wishful Puppeteer" includes the lyric "text to burn" in reference to Bulgakov's combustion of an early draft of the book and other works; and the liner notes' back page features the same quote from Faust that prefaces the novel.

=== Quotations ===
In addition to the numerous historical, literary and cultural references made in the album's lyrics, the inside back cover of the liner notes bears a pair of quotations designed to illustrate the album's juxtaposition of "legitimate" literature and philosophy with American pop culture:

- "Who are thou, then?"

"Part of that Power which eternally wills evil and eternally works good."
-from Goethe's Faust (also prefaces The Master and Margarita, which as noted above is referenced elsewhere in the album)

- "Everything was fine until dickless here cut off the power grid!"

"Is this true?"
"Yes, your honor, this man has no dick."
-Bill Murray in Ghostbusters

== Track listing ==
All songs written by The Lawrence Arms

1. "Introduction: The Ramblin' Boys of Pleasure Sing the Hobo Clown Chorus" - 0:26
2. "The Raw and Searing Flesh" - 3:07
3. "On With the Show" - 1:29
4. "Drunk Mouth Kitchen Smile" - 2:26
5. "Alert the Audience!" - 2:16
6. "Fireflies" - 3:54
7. "The March of the Elephants" - 1:28
8. "Chapter 13: The Hero Appears" - 2:50
9. "Hesitation Station" - 1:43
10. "The Revisionist" - 3:19
11. "The Ramblin' Boys of Pleasure" - 2:44
12. "A Wishful Puppeteer" - 2:11
13. "The Disaster March" - 3:51
14. "Outro: Hobo Reprise" - 0:27

== Personnel ==
- Chris McCaughan - guitar, vocals
- Brendan Kelly - bass guitar, vocals
- Neil Hennessy - drums
- Additional musicians: Rob Kellenberger, Sansvin Hennessy, Matt Allison, Mark Lynn Baker and Pete Anna

== Album information ==
- Record label: Fat Wreck Chords
- Recorded and mixed in June 2003 at Atlas Studios by Matt Allison
- Produced by Matt Allison and the Lawrence Arms
- Mastered at West West Side Mastering by Alan Douches
- All songs by the Lawrence Arms
- Art direction and layout by David Holtz
- Photography by Hiro Tanaka and Ben Pier
- Footnotes by Chris McCaughan and Brendan Kelly
