= The Broadways =

Former punk band from Chicago (1996–1998)

- Origin: Chicago, Illinois, United States
- Genres: Punk rock
- Years active: 1996–1998
- Labels: Asian Man Records; Bicycle Records
- Members: Brendan Kelly; Chris McCaughan; Dan Hanaway; Rob DePaola

The Broadways was a short-lived American punk band from Chicago, Illinois, United States, formed in 1996 after the dissolution of the ska-punk band Slapstick. The latter's vocalist Brendan Kelly and trumpet player Dan Hanaway assumed the roles of bassist and guitarist, joined by Rob DePaola on drums and Chris McCaughan (formerly of Tricky Dick) on guitar. All but DePaola also assumed vocal duties.

== History ==
The Broadways acknowledged musical influence from and drew comparisons to Crimpshrine, Fifteen and Jawbreaker. Their songs are typically characterised by socio-political lyrics and a lack, both lyrically and musically, of adherence to traditional verse-chorus structures.

The band released one full album, Broken Star, in 1998 on Asian Man Records. They broke up later that year, with Kelly stating a reason of “all of us growing out of where we were in our lives when we started the band”. Subsequently, Kelly and McCaughan formed The Lawrence Arms, and Hanaway and DePaola formed The Honor System.

A compilation entitled Broken Van was released in 2000, comprising 6 songs recorded after Broken Star (thought to have been planned for release on a split with Baxter) and all the songs from their pre-album EPs (except “Ben”, which had already been re-released on Broken Star as “Ben Moves to California”).

In 2007 and 2008, Asian Man Records announced plans to reissue both of the band's albums on vinyl and CD. Broken Star had long since sold out on vinyl, whereas Broken Van had been CD-only; both had for some time been out of stock on CD. In late 2007, Mike Park posted a thread on his label’s forum stating that he could not find a copy of Broken Van and would need a fan to provide one in order for the reissue to go ahead. His request was successful. The new vinyl edition of Broken Van went on sale in July 2008, and that of Broken Star was released shortly after.

It was announced in May 2013, that the Broadways will playing a reunion show at Riot Fest 2013 in Chicago.

== Members ==
- Brendan Kelly: bass, vocals
- Dan Hanaway: guitar, vocals
- Chris McCaughan: guitar, vocals
- Rob DePaola: drums

== Discography ==
=== Albums ===
- Broken Star (Asian Man Records, 1998)
- Broken Van (Asian Man Records, 2000)

=== EPs, etc. ===
- We All Know That You Can Do It 7" (Bicycle Records, 1997)
- Big City Life EP, CD/7" (Asian Man Records, 1998)

The tracks from these two EPs were re-released on the post-breakup compilation Broken Van, with the exception of the former’s song "Ben", which was re-recorded and re-titled as "Ben Moves To California" on the earlier album Broken Star.

- Where's the Beef? (Drive Thru Records, 1997): this compilation contains the exclusive song "Fuck the Church"

== Legacy ==
=== Cover versions by The Lawrence Arms and Sundowner ===
Despite having claimed that they never would, The Lawrence Arms performed songs by The Broadways, during their late 2007 tour: "15 Minutes" and "The Kitchen Floor". Brendan sang "15 Minutes", which was originally sung by Dan; its inclusion instead of one of his own songs is probably due to its relative popularity among The Broadways' catalogue, being their only track offered as a free download on the official Asian Man Records website. Chris performed his song "The Kitchen Floor"; he has also gone on to do so under his solo project, Sundowner. Also performed during the tour was Slapstick's "Broken Down", lending support to the theory that the likely reason for the inclusion of these songs is because the tour was something of a showcase for Brendan and Chris's various projects, leading to some of their older songs being added for the sake of completion and to please die-hard fans. It is unclear whether any future performances by The Lawrence Arms will feature old songs.

=== Reunion concert ===
As part of the Asian Man Records 15th Anniversary Festival in 2011, for which founder Mike Park set himself the lofty goal of recruiting – including reuniting, if necessary – every band who had ever released on his label, all four members of The Broadways reunited to play an afternoon matinee show on the 17th of June. The festival had already seen Dan and Brendan perform in their earlier band Slapstick the day before, and would later see both participate in performances by their current bands (respectively) Ratasucia and The Lawrence Arms. The Broadways played on the third day of Riot Fest Chicago in 2013.

== See also ==
- The Honor System
- The Lawrence Arms
