= The Honor System (band) =

American punk rock band

- Origin: Chicago, Illinois, United States
- Genres: Punk rock, alternative rock
- Years active: 1999–2004, 2026-present
- Labels: Asian Man; Double Zero; Grey Flight; Suburban Home
- Members: Dan Hanaway; Tyler Wiseman; Chris Carr; Rob DePaola
- Past members: Tim McIlrath; Nolan McGuire
- Website: www.myspace.com/thehonorsystem

The Honor System is an American punk rock band from Chicago, Illinois, formed in 1999 by Dan Hanaway and Rob DePaola, after the breakup of their previous band The Broadways. The band briefly featured future Rise Against frontman Tim McIlrath as a bassist. They went on hiatus in 2004, leaving behind two studio albums and three EPs. In 2026 they reunited to perform at Asian Man Records' 30th anniversary celebration.

== History ==
The Honor System initially consisted of former members of The Broadways, Dan Hanaway (vocals, guitar) and Rob DePaola (drums), along with Nolan McGuire (guitar) and Tim McIlrath (bass, vocals). Their first release was a 1999 demo cassette comprising the songs "Fool's Gold", "Single File" (the band's only song with main vocals by McIlrath) and "Facelift". This demo was reissued by Solidarity Recordings in 2010 on 7" vinyl record and as a digital download. In 2011, it was released on CD as part of Solidarity's compilation of the band's first few releases, Collection.

Soon after, Chris Carr replaced McIlrath, who went on to form Rise Against. The band recorded and released their first full-length album Single File on Asian Man Records in 2000, featuring re-recordings of "Fool's Gold" and "Facelift" from the demo tape.

The band's second release, the six-song EP 100% Synthetic, was released on Double Zero Records in May 2001. Later that year, McGuire left and was replaced by Tyler Wiseman, formerly of Tuesday.

After a couple of national tours, the band released a self-titled three-song EP (limited to 1000 copies ) featuring the songs "Moving Day", "The Sound of Sinking" and "American Math" and showing a move toward a heavier sound, bolstered by the arrival of Wiseman. This was followed three months later by the band's second full-length recording, Rise and Run, which featured re-recordings of the EP's first 2 tracks.

Shortly after Rise and Run's release, the band went on hiatus when DePaola left to look after his ailing mother. Not long after, Hanaway and Wiseman formed Whale|Horse with other Chicago-based musicians. An early incarnation of the band recorded some demos, before Carr returned on bass, joined by ex-Sweep the Leg Johnny drummer Scott Anna on drums. The new line-up recorded and released a self-produced debut EP, Count the Electric Sheep, in 2007. Whale|Horse no longer appears to be active, but Hanaway and Carr have continued playing together: they formed the band Ratasucia, who released the debut album White Noise Pollution in 2011 and have played concerts.

In August 2008, Solidarity Recordings released Single File on vinyl for the first time, in two colours (limited to 400 and 100). In September, I Hate Punk Rock Records reissued Rise and Run in 3 colours and as a special edition featuring all 3 standard colours and 3 rare presses, limited to 5.

In April 2010, Solidarity Recordings reissued a remastered edition of the band's original 1999 demo tape, on three colours of 7" vinyl and digital download (Amazon MP3 and iTunes). In 2011, Demo Tape was additionally released on CD as part of the compilation Collection, which also contained the long-out-of-print Single File and 100% Synthetic.

In 2025, the band's original label Asian Man Records reissued the two full-length albums and the EP 100% Synthetic on vinyl. The albums were remastered for vinyl. The EP was rereleased with the title 110% Synthetic, and featured a previously unreleased track, and several demo versions of tracks recorded in the run up to Rise And Run and the prior self-titled single.

== Style ==
Lyrically, whereas the other band formed from The Broadways' break-up, The Lawrence Arms, favour more introspective lyrics, Dan Hanaway's lyrics for The Honor System retain his socio-political perspective: covering issues including, but not limited to, police corruption ("Nails", "The Blaming Game"), criticism of the media ("The Blaming Game", "Losing Connection", "Hz"), anti-capitalism/corporatism ("Fool's Gold", "Muffled By Concrete", "Replacement Parts", "Moving Day"), the encroachment of development over the natural environment and human life ("Muffled by Concrete", "Conquistadors"), war ("Clockwork"), prisons and the prison-industrial complex ("The Rise and Run"), etc.

Musically, the band built upon The Broadways' melodic punk rock, dual guitars, and non-traditional song structures – incorporating more advanced production, more developed instrumentation, and an increasingly heavy sound, the latter particularly after McGuire's replacement by Wiseman. Hanaway's vocals show a continued evolution from their rougher sound on his earlier works.

== Band members ==
=== Final line-up ===
- Dan Hanaway – vocals, guitar (1999-2004)
- Rob DePaola – drums (1999-2004)
- Chris Carr – bass guitar (1999-2004)
- Tyler Wiseman – guitar (2001-2004)

=== Past members ===
- Nolan McGuire – guitar (1999–2001)
- Tim McIlrath – bass guitar (1999)

== Discography ==
=== Studio albums ===
- Single File (Asian Man Records, 2000)
- Rise and Run (2003)

=== EPs ===
- Demo Tape (self-released, 1999) (officially re-released on Solidarity Recordings, 2010)
- 100% Synthetic (Double Zero Records, 2001)
- The Honor System (2003)

=== Compilation albums ===
- Collection (Solidarity Recordings, 2011)

=== Compilation appearances ===
- Magnetic Curses: A Chicago Punk Rock Compilation (2000) – "Fool's Gold" (demo)
- Living Tomorrow Today: A Benefit for Ty Cambra (2001) – "Witchhunt" (unreleased version)
