= Umoja Orchestra =

The Umoja Orchestra was a Gainesville, Florida–based band whose music incorporated elements from afrobeat, jazz, funk, afro-cuban as well as traditional African, Caribbean and South American styles like salsa and merengue. The band's instrumentation was modeled closely to bands such as Fela Kuti's Africa 70 and the Antibalas Afrobeat Orchestra.

Umoja Orchestra was a strong presence in the Gainesville music scene. The band was especially known for its energetic, crowd-pleasing, and dance-oriented live performances, usually selling out local venues and putting on spectacular shows. They have gone on three national tours, mostly through the East Coast, but as far as Texas. The name "Umoja" comes from the Swahili word for "unity".

== Members ==
- Sebastián López Velásquez: Guitar, Vocals, Charango, Accordion
- Natalia Pérez: Vocals, Percussion
- Michael Pedron: Bass
- Michael Claytor: Banjo, Percussion
- David Borenstein: Saxophone, Clarinet
- Irving Campbell: Saxophone
- Jason Prover: Trumpet
- Evan Hegarty: Keyboard
- Keegan Jerabek: Trumpet
- Evan Garfield: Drumset
- Doug Fischer: Trombone
- Micah Shalom: Trombone
- David Choo: Saxophone
- Adam Finkelman: Percussion, Timbales
- Scott Bihorel: Congas
- Scott Clayton: Guitar
- Paul Kronk: Guitar
- Johnny Frias: Congas

== Discography ==
- Dinner at the Republic 2009
- Abre la Puerta 2008
- Umoja Means Unity 2007

== See also ==
- Afrobeat
- Fela Kuti
- Antibalas Afrobeat Orchestra
- World Music
- descarga
