= Slapstick (album) =

Compilation album by Slapstick
- Released: June 10, 1997
- Genre: Ska-Punk
- Label: Asian Man Records

Slapstick chronology
Lookit! (1996)	Slapstick (1997)

Professional ratings
Review scores
Source	Rating
Allmusic	4.5/5 stars
PunkNews	5/5 stars

Slapstick is a compilation of most songs recorded by Chicago ska-punk band Slapstick. It was released by Asian Man Records in 1997. Tracks 7 to 20 were originally located on Slapstick's only full-length album, Lookit! Tracks 1 to 6 were planned to be on their second album and released on Hellcat Records, but the band broke up prior to recording enough songs for a full-length album.

== Track listing ==
1. "There's a Metalhead in the Parking Lot" - 2:29
2. "The Park" - 2:15
3. "Eighteen" - 2:34
4. "What I Learned" - 1:17
5. "February One" - 1:39
6. "Sick of This Place" - 2:05
7. "Good Times Gone" - 1:27
8. "Almost Punk Enough" - 1:52
9. "Cheat to Win" - 2:06
10. "Crooked" - 1:47
11. "Colorado" - 1:34
12. "74 Fullerton" - 2:24
13. "She Doesn't Love Me" - 2:13
14. "My Way" - 2:15
15. "The Geek" - 2:47
16. "Not Tonight" - 1:07
17. "Ed" - 2:05
18. "The Punks" - 1:59
19. "Nate B." - 3:01
20. "Broken Down" - 2:36
21. "Johnny" - 3:31
22. "Wake Up Stanley" - 2:14
23. "My Only Friend" - 2:59
24. "Earth Angel" (The Penguins cover) - 2:21
25. "Alternative Radio" - 1:31
