= Apathy and Exhaustion =

Studio album by The Lawrence Arms
- Released: February 12, 2002
- Recorded: September–October 2001
- Genre: Punk rock
- Length: 35:38
- Label: Fat Wreck Chords
- Producer: Matt Allison

The Lawrence Arms chronology
| Present Day Memories (2002) | Apathy and Exhaustion (2002) | The Greatest Story Ever Told (2003) |

Professional ratings
Review scores
| Source | Rating |
|---|---|
| AllMusic | 4.5/5 stars |

Apathy and Exhaustion is the third album by the Chicago, Illinois punk rock band The Lawrence Arms, released in 2002 by Fat Wreck Chords. It was the band's first album to be released on that label, and with this release, the band formed a close relationship with the label and its founder Fat Mike, with whom they released their next two albums. It was also their first full-length album recorded with producer Matt Allison, with whom they would go on to record all of their subsequent material.

Apathy and Exhaustion shows the band experimenting with verse/chorus structures, and infectious pop melodies.

Fat Mike included this album on a list of the 25 best albums released on Fat Wreck Chords.

An independent music video was filmed for the song "Porno and Snuff Films."

== Pseudonyms ==
In the album's liner notes, the band members identify themselves under the false names Clarence Darrow, Lehigh Acres, and Weekawken Hennessy. These names correspond to several historical figures and locations:

- Clarence Darrow, the lawyer and ACLU leader who defended Leopold and Loeb in their murder trial in 1924 and John T. Scopes in the famous "Monkey" Trial of 1925.
- Lehigh Acres, a community in Florida that was started as a tax shelter in the mid-1950s by Chicago businessman Lee Ratner.
- Weehawken, a New Jersey township at the western end of the Lincoln Tunnel that was the site of the famous duel between Alexander Hamilton and Aaron Burr in 1804.

== Track listing ==
1. "Porno and Snuff Films" - 2:33
2. "The First Eviction Notice" - 2:39
3. "Navigating the Windward Passage" - 3:23
4. "Your Gravest Words" - 4:19
5. "Boatless Booze Cruise Part 1" - 3:27
6. "Brick Wall Views" - 4:12
7. "The Corpses of Our Motivations" - 3:18
8. ""I'll Take What's in the Box, Monty"" - 3:59
9. "Right as Rain Part 2" - 2:37
10. "3am QVC Shopping Spree Hangover" - 2:30
11. "Abracadaver" - 2:41

== Performers ==
- Chris McCaughan - guitar, vocals
- Brendan Kelly - bass, vocals
- Neil Hennessy - drums

== Album information ==
- Record label: Fat Wreck Chords
- Recorded, mixed and produced September–October 2001 at Atlas Studios in Andersonville, Chicago by Matt Allison
- Paintings and sketches by Josh Marshall
- Type design and layout by David Holtz
- Additional art and layout by the Lawrence Arms and Kate McCaughan
