= The Falcon (band) =

American punk rock band

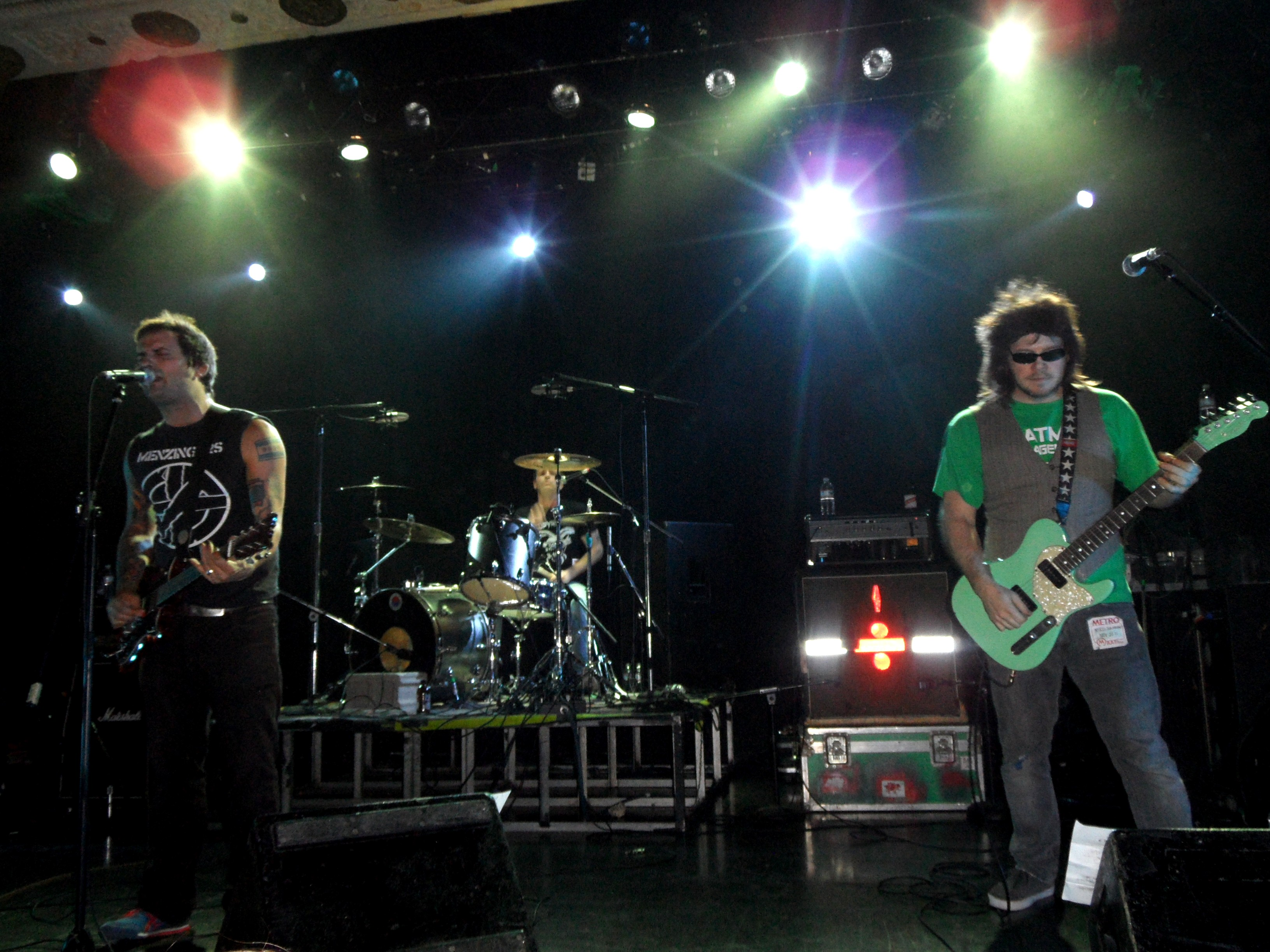

Background information
- Origin: Chicago, Illinois, United States
- Genre: Punk rock
- Years active: 2004–present
- Label: Red Scare Industries
- Members: Brendan Kelly; Neil Hennessy; Dan Andriano; Dave Hause
- Past members: Todd Mohney; Eli Caterer; Derek Grant; Sam Russo

The Falcon is an American, Chicago-based punk rock supergroup. The band features The Lawrence Arms members Brendan Kelly (guitar and vocals) and Neil Hennessy on drums, Alkaline Trio's Dan Andriano (vocals and bass) and The Loved Ones’ Dave Hause (guitar and vocals).

Todd Mohney of Rise Against played guitar on the 2004 God Don't Make No Trash or Up Your Ass with Broken Glass EP but could not attend the recording session for the band's first full length Unicornography, and his spot was temporarily filled in by Kelly and Hennessy prior to Hause appearing on Gather Up The Chaps.

== History ==
Kelly, the creative force behind the band, has said in interviews that the line-up would almost definitely change in order to tour successfully. Specifically, he cited Andriano's role in Alkaline Trio as making the bass player's availability for touring limited. Kelly and Andriano previously played together from 1993-1996 in the ska/punk band Slapstick.

In December 2004, the band released the EP God Don't Make No Trash -or- Up Your Ass With Broken Glass. An interesting trait of the EP is that, like the name of the EP, each song has two different names in a style mimicking that of The Rocky and Bullwinkle Show episode titles. The EP received a number of positive reviews.

On September 26, 2006, the band released their first full-length album Unicornography. The album has a very fast paced, hard sound with strong raspy vocals, in comparison to The Lawrence Arms older works, and is more similar in tone and style to their 2006 album, Oh! Calcutta!. The album also features re-recorded versions of the songs "I'm So Happy I Could Just Cry Myself to Sleep -or- The Routes We Wander" and "Building the Perfect Asshole Parade -or- Scratching Off the Fleas", both of which were originally featured on the band's 2004 God Don't Make No Trash or Up Your Ass with Broken Glass EP. In 2007 they made their first music video for the song "The La-Z-Boy 500." Eli Caterer of Smoking Popes joined the band in September 2007 for a tour with the Lawrence Arms. At an intimate show at the borderline in London on July 7, 2012, Brendan Kelly and Dan Andriano admitted Sam Russo into the band as touring guitarist and backing vocalist.

On March 21, 2015, Dave Hause announced that he had joined the band in his e-newsletter.

== Discography ==
=== Releases ===
- God Don't Make No Trash or Up Your Ass with Broken Glass (2004 EP, Red Scare Industries)
- Unicornography (2006 album, Red Scare Industries)
- Gather Up the Chaps (2016 album, Red Scare Industries)

=== Music videos ===
| Year | Title | Album | Other information |
|---|---|---|---|
| 2008 | "The La-Z-Boy 500" | Unicornography | |
| 2015 | "Sergio's Here" | Gather Up the Chaps | |
| 2015 | "Black Teeth" | Gather Up the Chaps | |
| 2015 | "War of Colossus" | Gather Up the Chaps | |

=== Compilations ===
- Protect: A Benefit for the National Association to Protect Children (2005, Fat Wreck Chords)
  - Includes "Building The Perfect Asshole Parade -or- Scratching Off The Fleas" from God Don't Make No Trash or Up Your Ass with Broken Glass
- Take Action! Volume 5 (2007, Sub City Records)
  - Includes "The La-Z-Boy 500" from Unicornography
- Plea For Peace Vol. 2 (2007, Asian Man Records)
  - Includes "Blackout" from Unicornography
- Red Scare Industries: 10 Years Of Your Dumb Bullshit (2014, Red Scare Industries)
  - Includes the exclusive "We Are the Bald"
- Red Scare Industries: 20 Years of Dreaming And Scheming (2024, Red Scare Industries)
  - Includes the exclusive "Book of Dead Names"

== Uses in media ==
The song "Blackout" was featured in the 2007 EA Sports skateboarding video game Skate.
