= Brendan Kelly (musician) =

American musician (born 1976)

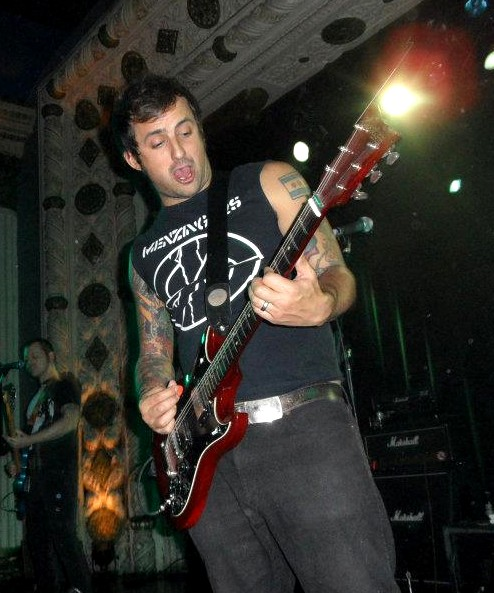

Background information
- Born: September 8, 1976 (age 50)
- Origin: St. Louis, Missouri
- Genre: Punk rock
- Occupations: Bassist, musician, songwriter, writer, television host
- Instruments: Vocals, Bass, Guitar
- Years active: 1993–present
- Labels: Fat Wreck Chords; Asian Man Records; Red Scare Industries

Brendan Edward Kelly (born September 8, 1976) is the bassist/vocalist of Chicago-based punk band the Lawrence Arms, as well as guitarist/lead vocalist in the Falcon and Brendan Kelly and the Wandering Birds. Kelly's former bands include Slapstick and the Broadways. He is known for his raspy vocals, drunken demeanor, and onstage witticisms.

== Early life and education ==
He attended Northwestern University in Evanston, Illinois, and graduated in 2000 with a bachelor's degree in Radio, Television, and Film.

== Career ==
Kelly has worked as an advertising copywriter for different agencies across Chicago, including FCB

Kelly provided backup vocals for the songs "The Company," "Stuck in Summertime," and "Unsatisfied" on the Copyrights' third full-length album, 2007's Make Sound, released on Red Scare Industries, a label owned and operated by Tobias Jeg, a close friend of Kelly. Kelly (along with Chris McCaughan, co-vocalist of the Lawrence Arms) also provided back-up vocals on Common Rider's This is Unity Music album.

Sometime around 2008 Fat Mike of NOFX reached out to Kelly to collaborate on the Home Street Home musical. Kelly passed.

In 2010, Kelly released a split album with Joe McMahon of punk rock band Smoke or Fire, titled Wasted Potential. Kelly's half of the split contained acoustic versions of Lawrence Arms songs (both his and McCaughan), as well as a cover of "Kiss the Bottle" by Jawbreaker.

In 2011, Kelly released a three-song EP, A Man with the Passion of Tennessee Williams, with new band the Wandering Birds. A full-length, I'd Rather Die Than Live Forever, followed in 2012. The Wandering Birds are generally darker in tone than Kelly's earlier musical output. He also created a short film, The Spirit of Transparency, to promote the project.

During the periods of inactivity of his musical projects, Brendan has been joined by fellow punk rock singers Laura Jane Grace and Brian Fallon in maintaining a blog, Bad Sandwich Chronicles. The blog is a mixture of scatological humor, social commentary, and stories of life in music. Kelly also co-hosts iconic music television program JBTV in Chicago.

Kelly also provided guest vocals on the Alkaline Trio song "I Wanna Be A Warhol" on their 2013 release My Shame Is True.

Kelly is also now part of Punk Rock Weddings, which is the brainchild of Mike Park, founder of Asian Man Records

== Nihilist Arby's ==
In 2015, Kelly started the Nihilist Arby's Twitter account after becoming disillusioned with his advertising job where he worked as a copywriter for Boeing and CenturyLink. The idea for the account emerged after a meeting with Alimentos Polar, the Venezuelan-based company behind the cornmeal brand Harina P.A.N. During the meeting, the company expressed the desire to make their cornmeal the most ubiquitous in the world by using Twitter.

The account quickly garnered a massive following with its highly cynical, "absurdist, death-and-doom tweeting" about Arby's and life in general. Kelly described the concept as "the malaise of corporate life as filtered through the most banal job there could possibly be". It received positive attention from Arby's and led to a role on The Onion's ad team.

== Political views ==
Kelly appeared on The Daily Show in a correspondent piece by Ed Helms titled "The Clash" in which he criticized Michale Graves for being a Republican.

Kelly boycotts the Warped Tour on the belief that it ruins the original system for underground bands of touring and supporting larger bands, as well as ruining business for small venues. He along with the Lawrence Arms were banned for life for spreading this belief to the audience whilst participating in the Warped Tour.

== Discography ==
=== Slapstick ===
Albums

- Lookit! (Dill Records, 1995)
- Slapstick (AKA: 25 Songs / Discography) (Asian Man Records, 1997)

Other Releases

- Slapstick / Tommyrot (Split, Banter Records, 1993)
- Superhero (7-inch EP, Self-Released, 1995)
- Crooked (7-inch EP, Dyslexic Records, 1995)

=== The Broadways ===
Albums

- Broken Star (Asian Man Records, 1998)
- Broken Van (Asian Man Records, 2000)

Other Releases

- We All Know That You Can Do It (7-inch EP, Bicycle Records, 1997)
- Big City Life (7-inch EP, Asian Man Records, 1998)
- Where's the Beef? (Drive Thru Records, 1997)

=== The Lawrence Arms ===
Albums

- A Guided Tour of Chicago (Asian Man Records, 1999)
- Ghost Stories (Asian Man Records, 2000)
- Apathy and Exhaustion (Fat Wreck Chords, 2002)
- The Greatest Story Ever Told (Fat Wreck Chords, 2003)
- Oh! Calcutta! (Fat Wreck Chords, 2006)
- Metropole (Epitaph Records, 2014)
- Skeleton Coast (Epitaph Records, 2020)

Other Releases

- Shady View Terrace / The Lawrence Arms (Split, Asian Man Records, 2000)
- Present Day Memories (Split w/ The Chinkees, Asian Man Records, 2000)
- Fat Club (7-inch EP, Fat Wreck Chords, 2001)
- Cocktails & Dreams (Compilation, Asian Man Records, 2005)
- Buttsweat and Tears (7-inch EP, Fat Wreck Chords, 2009)
- News From Yalta (7-inch EP, Epitaph Records, 2014)
- We Are the Champions of the World (Compilation, Fat Wreck Chords, 2018)

=== The Falcon ===
Albums

- Unicornography (Red Scare Industries, 2006)
- Gather Up the Chaps (Red Scare Industries, 2016)

Other Releases

- God Don't Make No Trash or Up Your Ass with Broken Glass (Red Scare Industries, 2004)

=== Solo ===
Other Releases

- Wasted Potential (Split w/ Joe McMahon, Anchorless Records, 2010)

=== Brendan Kelly and the Wandering Birds ===
Albums

- I'd Rather Die Than Live Forever (Red Scare Industries, 2012)
- Keep Walkin' Pal (Red Scare Industries, 2018)

Other Releases

- European Vacation (Split w/ Dan Andriano in the Emergency Room, Red Scare Industries, 2012)

== See also ==
- The Lawrence Arms
- The Falcon
