= The Lawrence Arms =

American punk rock band

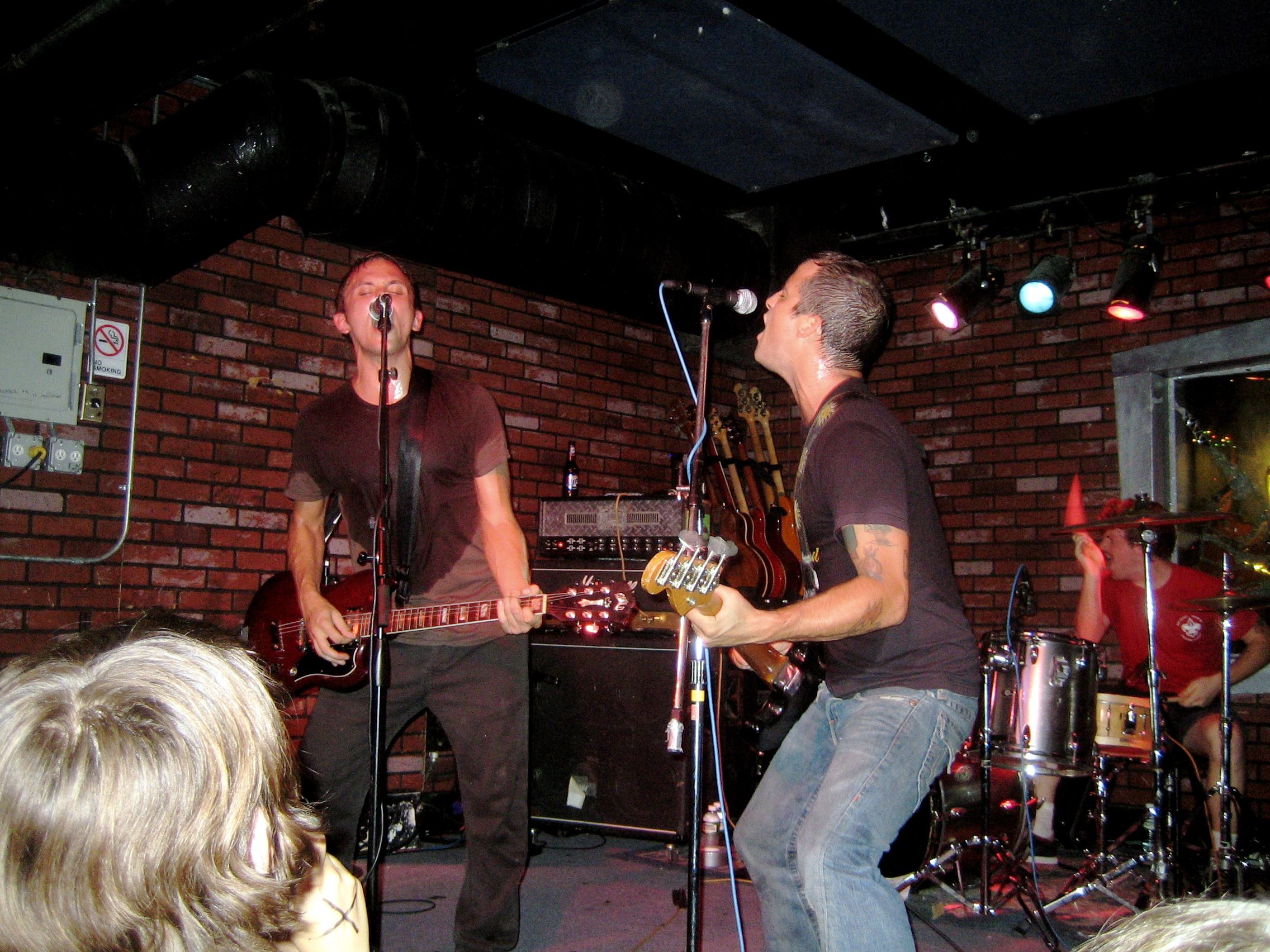
- Left to right: McCaughan, Kelly, and Hennessy in 2005

Background information
- Origin: Chicago, Illinois
- Genre: Punk rock
- Years active: 1999–present
- Labels: Asian Man, Fat Wreck Chords, Epitaph Records
- Members: Neil Hennessy; Brendan Kelly; Chris McCaughan
- Website: lawrencearmsdealer.com

The Lawrence Arms are an American punk rock band from Chicago, formed in 1999. They have released seven full-length albums and toured extensively.

== Band history ==
=== Pre-history ===
Prior to forming the Lawrence Arms, the three band members were active in other Chicago-area bands. Brendan Kelly had played in the ska punk band Slapstick. Chris McCaughan had played in Tricky Dick before joining Kelly in the punk band the Broadways. McCaughan and Kelly also shared an apartment together on Chicago's north side. Neil Hennessy, meanwhile, had played in a band called Baxter. Both Slapstick and the Broadways released albums on Asian Man Records, a small record label based in Monte Sereno, California, that would later release albums by the Lawrence Arms.

=== Formation and Asian Man years ===
The three musicians came together to form the Lawrence Arms in 1999, taking their name from the apartment complex in which Kelly and McCaughan had lived before being evicted in the middle of the night. Although punk rock bands in their infancy generally start out by releasing EPs and 7-inch vinyl singles, the band members used their existing relationship with Asian Man Records to immediately begin recording a full-length album, A Guided Tour of Chicago, which was released later that year and before the band had even played a single show. A second album, Ghost Stories, followed in 2000. Both albums focused heavily on the members' own stories of growing up and living in Chicago.

The band's next two releases were split EPs with other bands. The first, a split with Shady View Terrace, was released in 2000 and was their first release to be recorded by Matt Allison, who would continue to record and produce all of their subsequent releases. A second EP, Present Day Memories, was released in 2001 and was a split with the Chinkees.

=== Signing to Fat Wreck Chords ===
The band's split with the Chinkees had brought them to the attention of Fat Mike of NOFX, who signed them to his Fat Wreck Chords label in late 2001. Their first release on the label was a 7-inch vinyl single, part of the label's "Fat Club" series of 7-inch records. This was followed by the full-length album Apathy and Exhaustion, released in 2002. The album spawned the band's second music video, for the song "Porno and Snuff Films," and they toured extensively with NOFX and other bands from the Fat label.

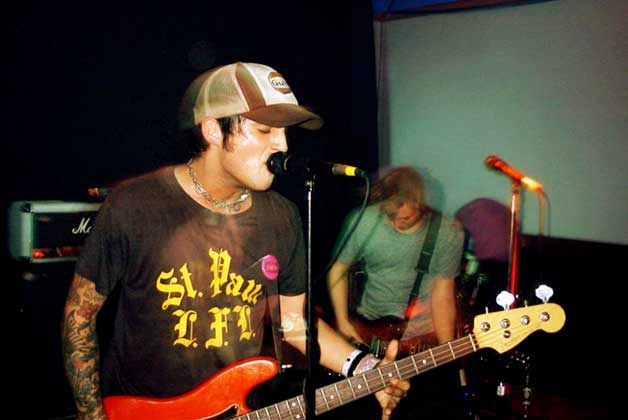
The Lawrence Arms in concert

Their next album was 2003's The Greatest Story Ever Told. Their most ambitious album to date, it demonstrated the band members' continued growth as musicians and songwriters and included extensive footnotes to the lyrics detailing their many references to history, literature, and pop culture. It also showed an evolution in the band's vocal style. Kelly had sung most of the vocals on their first album, while on subsequent releases he and McCaughan had split vocal duties almost equally from one song to the next, with Kelly's voice tending to sound more harsh and urgent while McCaughan's sounds more relaxed and melodic. With this release, however, the two began to move towards more of a duet style of singing which would feature prominently on their next album. Extensive touring following the album's release saw the band on the road for much of 2003 and 2004. They also contributed a song to the Fat Wreck Chords Rock Against Bush, Vol. 2 compilation, leading up to the 2004 presidential election and became involved with the Punk Voter campaign.

The Lawrence Arms also played a portion of the 2004 Warped Tour, but the band's attitude towards the tour resulted in controversy. In a 2006 interview, Kelly claimed that the band "did like seven days of it and we got kicked off it, banned for life" for "pointing out the obvious flaws of the Warped Tour, on stage while the people running the Warped Tour were watching us." When asked his opinion of the tour, Kelly responded:

Warped Tour, it’s destroying the economy of DIY; and it’s doing it very methodically and very successfully in that [the] summer touring season used to involve a bunch of bands, like Alkaline Trio for example, jumping on buses and taking smaller bands, like us and the Black Maria for example, on tour. There would be all these bands that would do that, so all these support bands would have great tours to go on. Kids in every town would have a bunch of different shows to go see, like over the summer. Small clubs would have big, good shows at least once a week if not twice a week, three times a week; and kids would have stuff to do. Now, all those big bands go on the Warped Tour. When they come to town, it’s for one day. It’s in a band shell, small clubs all across the US are closing down, they can’t afford to be open. Bands like us have to tour against the Warped Tour, which sucks; or tour on the Warped Tour, which sucks even more.

He further likened the experience of Warped Tour to "going to a band shell and buying twelve dollar bottles of water and standing there watching your favorite band play from like a million feet away." He also criticized the tour's effect on punk rock and independent music as a whole: "Now people talk about the Warped Tour like it's the greatest thing to ever happen to punk rock, it's not the greatest thing to ever happen to punk rock - it's single handedly dismantling the whole thing we've been fucking building for all this time and nobody gives a fuck...And that's why it's the worst thing to ever happen to punk rock, or DIY music in general." Their next album, 2006's Oh! Calcutta!, included a hidden track entitled "Warped Summer Extravaganza (Major Excellent)" referencing their attitude towards the tour.

=== The Falcon, Sundowner, and Oh! Calcutta! ===
In December 2004 Kelly and Hennessy joined with fellow Chicago natives Dan Andriano of the Alkaline Trio (who had played with Kelly in Slapstick) and Todd Mohney, formerly of Rise Against, to form another band called the Falcon, and released an EP on Red Scare Industries. Meanwhile, Asian Man Records released a Lawrence Arms compilation album titled Cocktails & Dreams including tracks from out-of-print split releases along with other rarities, b-sides, and re-recordings.

The Lawrence Arms re-entered the studio in October and November 2005 and recorded the album Oh! Calcutta!, which was released on Fat Wreck Chords in March 2006. The album was noted as faster and more energetic than the band's prior releases, with Kelly and McCaughan sharing lead vocals on every track. A music video was released for "The Devil's Takin' Names" from the album.

In March 2007, McCaughan released the debut album Four One Five Two from his acoustic side-project Sundowner, featuring two Lawrence Arms covers, one of which, "Boatless Booze Cruise" was originally sung by Kelly. The Lawrence Arms toured again in the fall of 2007, with their side projects the Falcon and Sundowner as openers along with the recently reunited American Steel. McCaughan also toured as Sundowner in the mainly acoustic/folk Revival Tour featuring Chuck Ragan of Hot Water Music, Ben Nichols of Lucero, and Tim Barry. Hennessy also joined fellow Chicagoans Smoking Popes on drums, touring and releasing music with them.

=== Recent activity ===
In June 2009, the Lawrence Arms recorded a studio EP. Titled Buttsweat and Tears, it was released on October 27 of that year through Fat Wreck Chords both as a 7-inch EP and as a digital download with an extra song. They then went on a tenth anniversary performance in October at the Metro Chicago, followed by a seven-date headlining tour of Arizona and California in November with Teenage Bottlerocket and Cobra Skulls as support.

The band’s 10th-anniversary performance at The Metro in their hometown of Chicago was recorded and slated for a release on DVD by Crankstrap Productions. However, complications that might have included logistics at Crankstrap, and/or might have included the band’s being audited by the IRS, meant that the DVD was consigned to purgatory until 2012, when Fat Wreck Chords announced that the video, titled An Evening of Extraordinary Circumstance, would finally be released on June 5 by them in collaboration with Crankstrap, a partnership previously announced in April 2011.

The Lawrence Arms signed with Epitaph Records and released their sixth studio album, Metropole, on January 28, 2014, along with the News From Yalta 7-inch.

On May 27, 2020, the band released "PTA", the lead single from their first album in six years and seventh overall studio album, Skeleton Coast, which was released on July 17 via Epitaph Records.

== Band members ==
- Chris McCaughan - guitar, vocals
- Brendan Kelly - bass, vocals
- Neil Hennessy - drums

== Discography ==
The Lawrence Arms discography
- Studio albums: 7
- Extended plays: 5
- Compilation albums: 1
- Music videos: 3
- Other appearances: 6

The discography of the Lawrence Arms consists of seven studio albums, one compilation album, five EPs, and three music videos.

=== Studio albums ===
Year	Album details	Peak chart positions	
Year	Album details	US	
Year	Album details	Independent	Heatseekers
1999	A Guided Tour of Chicago: Released: October 26, 1999; Label: Asian Man (ASM-046); Format: CD	—	—
2000	Ghost Stories: Released: May 2, 2000; Label: Asian Man (ASM-09); Format: CD	—	—
2002	Apathy and Exhaustion: Released: February 12, 2002; Label: Fat Wreck Chords (FAT637); Format: LP album, CD	—	—
2003	The Greatest Story Ever Told: Released: September 23, 2003; Label: Fat Wreck Chords (FAT668); Format: LP, CD	—	—
2006	Oh! Calcutta!: Released: March 7, 2006; Label: Fat Wreck Chords (FAT703); Format: LP, CD	34	26
2014	Metropole: Released: January 28, 2014; Label: Epitaph Records; Format: LP, CD	—	—
2020	Skeleton Coast: Released: July 17, 2020; Label: Epitaph Records; Format: LP, CD	—	—
"—" denotes releases that did not chart.

=== Compilation albums ===
Year	Album details
2005	Cocktails & Dreams: Released: June 21, 2005; Label: Asian Man (ASM-131); Format: LP album, CD
2018	We Are the Champions of the World: Released: March 30, 2018; Label: Fat Wreck Chords; Format: LP, CD

=== Extended plays ===
Year	EP details	Peak chart positions
Year	EP details	US
Year	EP details	Heatseekers
2000	Shady View Terrace / The Lawrence Arms: Released: 2000; Label: Castaway / Asian Man (ASM-072); Format: CD, EP	—
2001	Present Day Memories: Released: May 15, 2001; Label: Asian Man (ASM-077); Format: CD	—
2001	Fat Club: Released: December 2001; Label: Fat Wreck Chords; Format: 7-inch EP	—
2009	Buttsweat and Tears: Released: October 27, 2009 (FAT236); Label: Fat Wreck Chords; Format: 7-inch EP, download	38
2014	News from Yalta 7-inch: Released: January 28, 2014; Label: Epitaph Records; Format: 7-inch	—
"—" denotes releases that did not chart.

=== Music videos ===
Year	Song	Director	Album
1999	"An Evening of Extraordinary Circumstance"	Brendan Kelly	A Guided Tour of Chicago
2002	"Porno and Snuff Films"	Bob Trondson	Apathy and Exhaustion
2006	"The Devil's Takin' Names"	Bob Trondson	Oh! Calcutta!
2010	"Them Angels Been Talkin'"		Buttsweat and Tears
2013	"Seventeener (17th & 37th)"		Metropole

=== Other appearances ===
The following Lawrence Arms songs were released on compilation albums and as music downloads. This is not an exhaustive list; songs that were first released on the band's albums and EPs are not included.

Year	Release details	Track
2002	1157 Wheeler Avenue: Released: 2002; Label: Failed Experiment; Format: CD	"Nebraska" (live)
2002	Uncontrollable Fatulence: Released: November 19, 2002; Label: Fat Wreck Chords (FAT646); Format: CD	"Presenting: The Dancing Machine (Il Robot Con la Testa di Scimmia)"^{[I]}
2003	Oil: Chicago Punk Refined: Released: February 11, 2003; Label: Thick (THK-086); Format: CD	"Where Are You Going, Where Have You Been"^{[I]}
2003	Experiments in Audio Rocketry: Released: September 2, 2003; Label: 1-2-3-4 Go; Format: CD	"Traditional"
2004	Rock Against Bush, Vol. 2: Released: August 10, 2004; Label: Fat Wreck Chords (FAT677); Format: CD	"Necrotism: Decanting the Insalubrious (Cyborg Midnight), Part 7-inch^{[I]}

I Denotes songs that were re-released on Cocktails & Dreams.
