= Chris McCaughan =

American guitarist, vocalist (born 1977)

Chris McCaughan (born March 30, 1977), also known as Sundowner, is the guitarist and vocalist in the band The Lawrence Arms. McCaughan was formerly the guitarist for the bands Tricky Dick and The Broadways (the latter also featuring fellow Arms bandmate Brendan Kelly). His solo music is released under the name Sundowner.

== Career ==
In 2006, Chris started writing songs for a solo project, while playing intimate shows around Chicago, and posted four demo songs on his MySpace page. Adopting the name Sundowner, he finished recording his debut solo album with the help of The Lawrence Arms drummer Neil Hennessy on bass and Jenny Choi on cello, keys and backing vocals. The record, Four One Five Two (named after his parents' house, where he did much of his songwriting), was released on Red Scare records on March 13, 2007, and features reworked versions of the popular Lawrence Arms songs "100 Resolutions" and "Boatless Booze Cruise" (retitled "My Boatless Booze Cruise"); the latter was a song originally written and sung by Lawrence Arms bandmate and bassist Brendan Kelly.

McCaughan went on tour as Sundowner with Mike Park in Feb-Mar 2008 in the UK and Europe on what was known as the "Beans On Toast" Tour, because that is all the pair could afford to eat. Asian Man Records released the second Sundowner album We Chase The Waves on August 10, 2010. Sundowner's third full-length album, Neon Fiction, was released on Fat Wreck Chords in 2013.

McCaughan is known to use Guild S-100 guitars and Mesa Boogie mark IV amps.

McCaughan released music under the alias, Sundowner with backing members Jenny Choi, Neil Hennessy, and Eli Caterer. His debut album, Four One Five Two, was released on Red Scare Records on March 13, 2007. Asian Man Records released the second Sundowner album We Chase the Waves on August 10, 2010. Sundowner toured with Mike Park through the UK and Europe in February and March 2008. During live shows, Sundowner is also known to cover Lawrence Arms songs. Sundowner is currently signed to Fat Wreck Chords, and his third full-length album, Neon Fiction, was released on September 3, 2013.

== Discography ==
=== Studio albums ===
- Four One Five Two (2007)
- We Chase the Waves (2010)
- Neon Fiction (2013)

=== Live albums ===
- Little Elephant Sessions (2014)

=== Compilation albums ===
- Rock Against Malaria (2009)
