= Jawbreaker discography =

- Studio albums: 4
- Extended plays: 2
- Live albums: 1
- Compilation albums: 1
- Singles: 8
- Music videos: 1

The discography of Jawbreaker, an American punk rock band active from 1986 to 1996, and again since 2017, consists of four studio albums, one live album, one compilation album, two extended plays (EPs) and eight singles. The group has also contributed multiple songs to various compilations over the years, both during their time together as a band and posthumously.

Lead vocalist and guitarist Blake Schwarzenbach, bassist Chris Bauermeister, and drummer Adam Pfahler formed Jawbreaker while students at New York University, later relocating to Los Angeles where they released their debut album Unfun (1990) through independent record label Shredder Records. Relocating again to San Francisco the following year, they released 1992's Bivouac through the Tupelo Recording Company and The Communion Label. Jawbreaker toured with Nirvana in 1993 and released 24 Hour Revenge Therapy in 1994, attracting the attention of major labels. They signed with DGC Records and released 1995's Dear You, but its polished production and smooth vocals caused significant backlash from the band's core audience. Internal tensions led to Jawbreaker's dissolution in 1996.

== Albums ==
=== Studio albums ===
Year	Album details	Sources
1990	Unfun: Released: May 1990; Label: Shredder Records (SH-07); Formats: CD, cassette (CS), LP, digital download; Reissued: March 30, 2010 as a CD/LP on Blackball Records (BB-007)	
1992	Bivouac: Released: December 1992; Labels: Communion Label (COMM 38), Tupelo Recording Company (TUP 38); Formats: CD, CS, LP, digital download	
1994	24 Hour Revenge Therapy: Released: February 15, 1994; Labels: Tupelo Recording Company (TUP 49), Communion Label (COMM 49); Formats: CD, CS, LP, digital download	
1995	Dear You: Released: September 12, 1995; Label: DGC Records (DGC 24831); Formats: CD, CS, LP, digital download; Reissued: March 2, 2004 as a CD/2xLP on Blackball Records (BB-004)	

=== Live albums ===
Year	Album details	Comments	Sources
1999	Live 4/30/96: Released: November 2, 1999; Label: Blackball Records (BB-002); Formats: CD, LP, digital download	Most tracks were recorded at the Warfield Theatre in San Francisco, California where the band appeared in support of Foo Fighters and Ween as part of a Rock for Choice benefit on April 30, 1996. The LP version was issued on Allied Recordings (NO. 100) and limited to 206 copies; however, some are defective.	

=== Compilation albums ===
Year	Album details	Comments	Sources
2002	Etc.: Released: July 23, 2002; Label: Blackball Records (BB-003); Formats: CD, 2xLP, digital download	A collection of non-album tracks including compilation appearances, vinyl only material, b-sides and outtakes recorded between 1988 and 1995. Many of the releases on which these songs first appeared are now out of print. See also: List of compilation appearances	

== Extended plays ==
Year	EP details	Comments
1989	Whack & Blite: Released: 1989; Label: Blackball Records (BB-001); Format: 7-inch	All tracks from this EP appear on both CD versions of Unfun (SH-07CD, BB-007-CD) as bonus tracks. Between 1990 and 1992 the EP was repressed three additional times on Very Small Records (VSR 7).
1992	Chesterfield King: Released: 1992; Labels: Communion Label, Tupelo Recording Company (35-1); Format: 12-inch	All tracks from this EP appear on the CD version of Bivouac (COMM 38-2/TUP 38–2), absorbed into the album's track listing.

== Singles ==
=== Retail singles ===
Year	Single	Album
1989	"Busy" (single mix)	Non-album single^{[I]}
1995	"Fireman"	Dear You

- IIncluded as a bonus track on the 2010 reissue of Unfun.

=== Promotional singles ===
Year	Single	Album
1995	"Lurker II: Dark Son of Night" / "Million"	Dear You
1996	"Accident Prone"	Dear You

=== Split singles ===
Year	Split details	Tracks
1991	Jawbox / Jawbreaker: Released: June 1991; Label: Selfless Records (SFLS03); Format: 7-inch	Side A: Jawbox – "Air Waves Dreams"; Side B: Jawbreaker – "With or Without U-2"^{[I]}
1992	Steel Pole Bath Tub / Jawbreaker: Released: June 22, 1992; Label: Staplegun Records (SG 001); Format: 7-inch (included with vinyl format of "Surprise your pig")^{[II]}	Side A: Steel Pole Bath Tub – "We Walk"; Side B: Jawbreaker – "Pretty Persuasion"
1992	Jawbreaker / Samiam: Released: 1992; Label: No Idea Records (NIR008); Format: 7-inch^{[III]}	Side A: Jawbreaker – "Split"; Side B: Samiam – "Head Trap"
1993	Jawbreaker / Crimpshrine: Released: 1993; Label: Skene! Records; Format: 7-inch	Side A: Jawbreaker – "Better Half"; Side B: Crimpshrine – "Sanctuary"

- IA medley including portions of songs originally performed by U2, the Misfits and The Vapors.
- IIIncluded as a bonus with some copies of the Surprise Your Pig: A Tribute to R.E.M. LP.
- IIIIncluded as a bonus with No Idea Zine #10 and also as a standalone split.

== Music videos ==
Year	Title	Director
1995	"Fireman"	Mark Kohr

== Compilation appearances ==
Non-album studio tracks released prior to the band's breakup would later appear on Etc. in 2002.

Year	Title	Track	Label
1989	The World's in Shreds Volume Two 7-inch	"Shield Your Eyes"	Shredder Records
1989	Make the Collector Nerd Sweat 10-inch	"Gutless"	Very Small Records
1990	Hardcore Breakout USA CD/CS/LP	"Rich"	New Red Archives
1991	Brouhaha 7-inch	"Caroline"	Piggly Wiggly
1991	Very Small World LP	"Fantastic Planet"	Very Small Records
1992	17 Reasons: The Mission District 3x7-inch box set	"Kiss the Bottle"	Mission Merchants
1992	Four Two Pudding CD	"Fantastic Planet"	Very Small Records
1993	Surprise Your Pig: A Tribute to R.E.M. CD/LP+7-inch	"Pretty Persuasion"	Staplegun Records
1993	Music for the Proletariat CD	"Kiss the Bottle"	Allied Recordings
1994	Punk U.S.A. CD/CS/LP	"Sea Foam Green"	Lookout! Records
1994	The Smitten Love Song Comp. CD/LP	"Housesitter"	Karate Records
1995	The Sound Guy is Deaf and Drunk: 16 Bands Recorded Live at John Henry's CS	"Bivouac" (live)^{[I]}	Soda Girl Records
1996	Jabberjaw: Pure Sweet Hell CD/4x7-inch box set	"Sister"	Mammoth Records
2004	Rock Against Bush, Vol. 2 CD+DVD	"Chesterfield King" (live)^{[II]}	Fat Wreck Chords
2004	In Honor: A Compilation to Beat Cancer 2xCD	"Kiss the Bottle" (live)^{[III]}	Vagrant Records
2005	Protect: A Benefit for the National Association to Protect Children CD	"Want" (live)^{[II]}	Fat Wreck Chords
2007	For Callum 2xCD	"I Love You So Much It's Killing Us Both"^{[IV]}	Catlick Records

- IRecorded at John Henry's Tavern in Eugene, Oregon on June 30, 1993.
- IIRecorded at CBGB in New York, New York on May 23, 1993.
- II|Recorded at 924 Gilman Street in Berkeley, California on July 3, 1993.
- IVMono 16-track demo version recorded July 1994.
