= Unfun =

Studio album by Jawbreaker
- Released: May 1990
- Recorded: June 1989; January–February 1990
- Studios: Radio Tokyo, Venice, California
- Genres: Punk rock; pop-punk; emo; hardcore punk
- Length: 41:06
- Label: Shredder
- Producers: Richard Andrews, Jawbreaker

Jawbreaker chronology
Unfun (1990)	Bivouac (1992)

Unfun is the debut studio album by American punk rock band Jawbreaker, released in May 1990 through Shredder Records. The band members met one another at university and began rehearsing together in late 1986. After going through several names and a lineup change, Jawbreaker sent a copy of "Shield Your Eyes" to punk publication Maximum Rocknroll, which later caught the attention of Shredder Records founder Mel Cheplowitz. Following the release of the Whack & Blite EP and the "Busy" single, members of the band returned to education. While this was occurring, they wrote material that later appeared on their debut album, which was then recorded with producer Richard Andrews in January and February 1990 at Radio Tokyo in Venice, California.

Unfun received generally positive reviews from music critics, who complimented the album's sound and praised Schwarzenbach's lyricism. It is a punk rock, pop-punk, and hardcore punk album that evoked the sound of the Descendents and Hüsker Dü, with most of the songs being written in frontman Blake Schwarzenbach's New York apartment. Between June and September 1990, Jawbreaker embarked on a ten-week tour of the United States with Econochrist and Filth to promote the album. Two weeks into it, tensions rose between the members of Jawbreaker, with bassist Chris Bauermeister and Schwarzenbach's conflicting personalities leading to hostility. After the tour's conclusion, the band broke up and the members returned to education. Shredder Records later reissued it on CD in 1992 and 2002; drummer Adam Pfahler re-released it through his label Blackball Records in 2010.

== Background ==
Upon transferring to the Crossroads School in Santa Monica, California, at age 16, Adam Pfahler met Blake Schwarzenbach. The pair bonded over a shared interest in Los Angeles, California-based punk music and SST Records bands. The two of them, plus mutual friend Rich, formed the band Red Harvest in their first year of attendance. Pfahler and Schwarzenbach both left the band after graduating from Crossroads in 1985. Following this, Pfahler attended the University of Santa Monica, while Schwarzenbach went to the University of California, Santa Cruz; Chris Bauermeister, meanwhile, enrolled in New York University (NYU). Bauermeister joined Butcher Clyde after learning they were looking for a bassist, though they broke up during his second year. Shortly after this, Bauermeister opted to form his own band. In late 1986, Pfahler and Schwarzenbach moved to New York to attend NYU, sharing a dorm near Washington Square Park. The pair saw a flyer in the cafeteria of NYU, and after calling the number, they met up with Bauermeister, who the two had seen around the college. The trio played their first rehearsal together in November 1986 at Giant Studios, which was close to their NYU dorms.

The band went by the name Thumb before changing it to Terminal Island. For their first year, they unsuccessfully auditioned lead singers. Shortly afterwards, Pfahler transferred to the University of California, Los Angeles (UCLA); instead of looking for a new drummer, the band continued to meet up and write songs when breaks in their education allowed. In early 1987, they recorded an instrumental five-track demo tape. While at UCLA, Pfahler drafted in Jon Liu as their singer. Liu was formerly the frontman for Magnolia Thunderpussy, who had previously played a show with Red Harvest. From mid-1988, Bauermeister and Schwarzenbach decided to take a gap year to focus on the band, moving to Los Angeles in the process. During this time, they were going by the name Rise, and by October 1988, they had recorded seven tracks at a studio in Santa Monica. Liu sung vocals on almost every song, bar "Shield Your Eyes", which Schwarzenbach sung on. The following month, after laying down new vocals for "Shield Your Eyes", Bauermeister and Pfahler decided that Schwarzenbach should be their new frontman and let Liu go.

== Label and recording ==
A copy of "Shield Your Eyes" had been sent to the punk publication Maximum Rocknroll, who then played it on their radio station. Shredder Records founder Mel Cheplowitz heard the song and promptly asked the band to contribute to an upcoming various-artist compilation. They became aware of another band called Rise; the trio made notes of new names and put them into a hat, eventually landing on Jawbreaker. The World's in Shreds Volume II, which featured "Shield Your Eyes", saw release in February 1989. During the same month, the band recorded a demo tape. In the following weeks, they played at various club venues across Los Angeles. In May and June 1989, they recorded the Whack & Blite EP and "Busy" single with engineer Michael James; both of these were released through Pfahler's label, Blackball Records.

Shortly afterwards, they recorded another demo tape, which featured darker-sounding songs with more of a focus on the bass. Bauermeister and Schwarzenbach returned to NYU for their last year of education, where they continued to write material. They arranged the songs that feature on their debut album during the Christmas period. In January 1990, the band flew to Los Angeles; Unfun was recorded through to February 1990, over the course of 60 hours, at Radio Tokyo, located in Venice, California. Engineer Richard Andrews produced the recordings with members of the band. During the sessions, the band re-recorded several of the songs from their demo tapes. In a retrospective interview, Schwarzenbach said they had a single mindset to create Unfun: "with limited abilities and unlimited enthusiasm". "Busy", which was originally recorded at the same studio in June 1989, was remixed for inclusion on the album. Engineer Michael James handled the recording for the original version of "Busy". The album was mixed at Radio Tokyo using a mixdown deck provided by Jeff Martin, who also provided amplifiers. John Golden then mastered the recordings at Golden Mastering in Ventura, California.

== Composition and lyrics ==
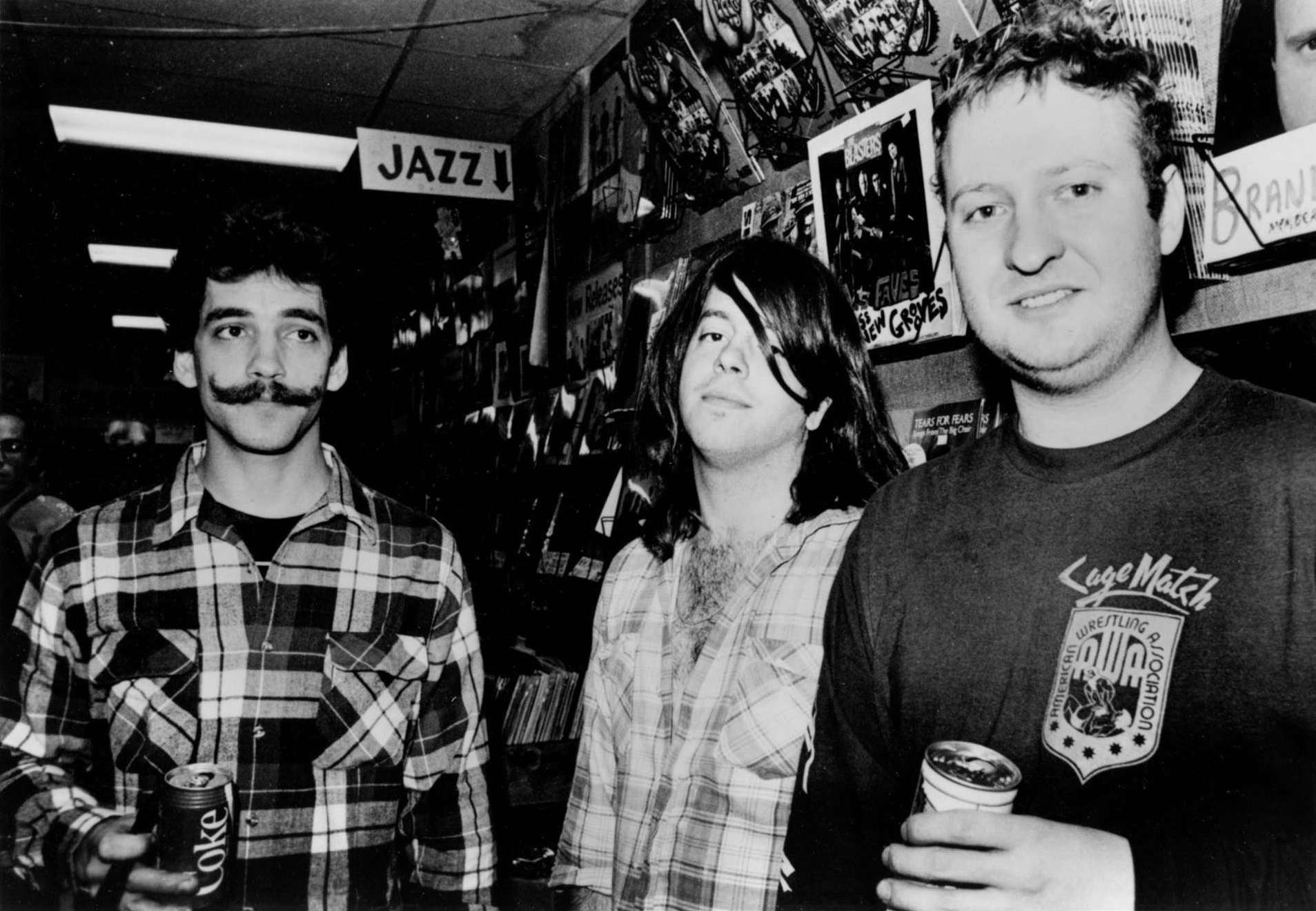
The music of Unfun has been compared to the work of Hüsker Dü.

Discussing the name Unfun in an interview with Maximum Rocknroll, Bauermeister explained it as the members of Jawbreaker having poor luck: "We seem to be building up litanies of disaster. Unfortunately, it's getting worse each time. One band's breaking point is basically our day-to-day." Musically, the sound of the album has been described as punk rock, pop-punk, emo and hardcore punk, with elements of post-punk. In his 33 1/3 book 24 Hour Revenge Therapy (2018) on the band, Ronen Givony said they sounded "uneven [and] embryonic: a band learning to shake off the weight of their heroes, or figuring out whether they want to sound more like Hüsker Dü, Scratch Acid, or The Jesus Lizard". Jorge Martins, staff writer for Ultimate Guitar, saw Unfun as the middle point between the sound of Descendents and Hüsker Dü, commenting that the revealing lyricism and "intense vocal delivery" from Schwarzenbach helped set Jawbreaker away from their contemporaries. Discussing the writing process, Bauermeister explained that Schwarzenbach or himself wrote a guitar riff, while the other comes up with an additional part; they would then "force Adam to learn it in a short period of time". Schwarzenbach said that Pfahler had collectively spent eight days learning all of the material. He estimated that about seven of the tracks were written in his New York apartment. In a 2010 interview, Pfahler said they were "not leaving well enough alone. It's gotta be this much. Like the fills gotta be this much longer and we're playing it this much faster and it's crazy."

With the album's opening track "Want", Givony compared the verse sections to the words of Allen Ginsberg: "the overflowing confession of a bibliophile with too much to say". Journalist Dan Ozzi, in his book Sellout: The Major-Label Feeding Frenzy That Swept Punk, Emo, and Hardcore 1994–2007 (2021), said the song, unlike the majority of Unfun, showcased the band's penchant for crafting "catchy earworms when they wanted to." He noted that the chorus did not appear until halfway into the song, "but it was unforgettable once it finally did." Schwarzenbach said "Seethruskin" was about the "far-reaching racism that is an outgrowth of apathy and classist divisions in schools and neighborhoods". "Imaginary War" incorporates a sample of a scream taken from the film The Warriors (1979). "Busy" sees Schwarzenbach attempting to help a friend that is having a mental breakdown and is followed by the anti-pornography track "Softcore". "Driven" has apocalyptic-themed lyrics, while the following track, "Wound", tackles guilt and self-doubt. In "Gutless", Schwarzenbach ponders if a friend is being true to themselves. "Lawn" details a Raymond Carver-esque scenario where a man watches his family from the afterlife. "Crane" recalls early hardcore punk; "Eye-5" foreshadows some of the sound the band explored with the second and third studio albums, Bivouac (1992) and 24 Hour Revenge Therapy (1994). Mischa Pearlman of Louder said it describes an immoral truck driver who turns into a murderer to "cleanse the world of evil-doers in a presumed attempt to ascend to Heaven."

== Release and reissues ==
Unfun saw release in May 1990 through Shredder Records; the artwork features a cat named Sammy, which lived with Schwarzenbach and his girlfriend in their New York City apartment. Schwarzenbach explained that he often rested on the floor while the animal was resting on the couch watching him. He "kept thinking, this is really cool looking, he looks larger than life, and there was a certain comic element there as well", and decided to take photographs of Sammy. The cover photograph was eventually supplied by Brendan Murdock of Mood Swing, while Wade Graham contributed the back photo. Jawbreaker, Murray Bowles, and Paul Robinson also provided insert photos; the latter of these also took the live photograph on the back cover. The band promoted the album with a ten-week-long cross-country trek across North America, which marked their first tour, between June and September 1990. They were accompanied for this trek by Econochrist and Filth. Schwarzenbach had booked the tour, dubbed the Fuck 90 tour, himself using his father's phone card and a copy of Book Your Own Fuckin' Life, Maximum Rocknroll's guide to venues. Schwarzenbach's father had given him the card in the event of emergencies and was in trouble with him afterwards; he reasoned that "everything's an emergency when you're on tour." In hindsight, he said he had no concept of "what I was doing – and it shows"; he estimated that Jawbreaker had around six positive shows, with the rest being "maybe 25 utterly forgettable metal-club-in-Florida-type shows".

By the two-week point, conflict appeared between the members, who did not like being stuck in a vehicle for ten hours at a time. Jawbreaker largely avoided performing "Busy" during this trek due to it giving Schwarzenbach issues with his throat. Bauermeister and Schwarzenbach's conflicting personalities led to hostility. The former was dealing with undiagnosed depression, which made him feel like a third wheel against Pfahler and Schwarzenbach. Bauermeister said that while touring was an exciting experience, it was straining their personal relationships, to the point that he was not talking to Pfahler and Schwarzenbach by the time they had made it to Canada. Though the tour helped establish the band on the national punk touring circuit, tensions between the members saw them break up upon returning home. After this, Bauermeister and Schwarzenbach returned to NYU, which was followed by several months without communication. In 1992, Shredder released the album on CD. At Cheplowitz's suggestion, all of the songs from the Whack & Blite EP were included on these editions. The band agreed, knowing that the EP was out of print at that time. In an interview a few years later, Bauermeister said the label had no interest in re-pressing the album on vinyl as no one was interested in Whack & Blite. Shredder Records reissued the CD in digipak packaging in 2002.

In January 2008, Pfahler announced that Unfun would be reissued later in the year; Jon Golden and Pfahler remastered the album the following month. In a subsequent update, Pfahler said the rest of their catalogue would be reissued in due time. According to Pfahler, Golden inspected the master tapes "and he smelled them and he was like, 'Uh-oh this is not gonna do, you gotta go take care of this.'" This prompted the pair to bake them in order to transfer the audio to a digital format ahead of the remastering. In October 2008, Pfahler said he was returning to the studio to continue working on the remaster, as there were "'flutters' in that first pass, which is a techie way of saying that gummy leader tape splices between the songs made the beginnings and endings sound like they had been drinking, which is a longwinded way of saying that it was fucked up." Though the plan for this reissue was to be initially a Hot Topic exclusive, this was later dropped. This edition was eventually released on March 30, 2010, adding the 7" mix of "Busy" as a bonus track, which had been left off the band's sole compilation, Etc. (2002). The booklet includes all of the artwork relating to Whack & Blite, as well as photographs of the band recording the album. Blackball Records has since re-pressed it on vinyl in 2015 and 2022.

== Reception ==
Professional ratings
Review scores
Source	Rating
AllMusic	4/5 stars
MusicHound Rock	5/5 stars
Pitchfork	7.7/10
Punknews.org	4/5 stars
Record Collector	4/5 stars
Select	3/5 stars

Reviewers were receptive to the album's sound. Jim Testa of Trouser Press wrote that the album served as a "rousing alternative to the testosterone-fueled thrash of '80s hardcore, proving that catchy pop-punk could provide the same intensity of feeling and spirit." Kelso Jacks of CMJ New Music Report noted that the album's "pop hooks melded with a coursing intensity. That combination allowed Jawbreaker to spit and kick while still artfully wearing its heart on its sleeve". Seattle Post-Intelligencer's Charlie Doherty said throughout Unfun, the listener "hear[s] Jawbreaker’s raw and hard-driving sound, and for most tracks, it makes for memorable material." Author Barry M. Prickett, writing in MusicHound Rock: The Essential Album Guide (1999), saw Unfun as the best entry point for new fans and cautioned any readers that played music to quit, "because you know you’ll never equal it, much less top it." Pitchfork contributor Brian wrote that the album shows the band's "conviction that punk could open up to pop while staying hardcore [as it] burns more urgently than ever, in the retrospective light of futility." Reviewing the remaster, Punknews.org staff writer Brian Shultz said it "seems to add a little more 'pop' to the overall mix; the percussive nuances are more distinct as well." Writing in 2018, Givony praised the production as it enabled the band to begin inching towards the act they would evolve into on subsequent releases.

Critics also praised Schwarzenbach's lyrics. Andy Greenwald, author of Nothing Feels Good: Punk Rock, Teenagers, and Emo (2003), felt that the lyricism had made Jawbreaker stand out from their North Californian peers. AllMusic reviewer Mike DaRonco wrote that the band "provides fitting background [music] to the personal side that they're not afraid to show." Record Collector writer Mischa Pearlman called it the band's "most straightforward" release, "yet still displays the fierce intelligence that elevated the band above the majority – if not all – of their punk contemporaries." Michael Nelson of Stereogum said the songs were "almost universally miserable, but the lyrics were so specific and quotably clever that they proved more validating than depressing, while the arrangements [...] were positively cathartic." Treble writer Ernest Simpson said that if he had heard Schwarzenbach's "thoughtful lyrics paired with the powerhouse trio's unpredictable and juggernaut song structures [earlier in his life], my head would have exploded."

=== Legacy ===
In an Alternative Press interview promoting Jawbreaker's fourth studio album, Dear You (1995), Schwarzenbach dismissed Unfun, saying that it lacked cohesion. For a retrospective piece on punk albums from 1990, Tim Stegall of Alternative Press wrote that Unfun was "another cornerstone of both the burgeoning punk-pop scene and the future emo outbreak." The album had an impact on Jim Ward of At the Drive-In, who started writing music because of it, in particular the song "Want". Jade Puget of AFI similarly said the album was an influence on his guitar playing, while Canadian band Unfun took their name from the album. For the tribute album Bad Scene, Everyone's Fault: Jawbreaker Tribute (2003), Name Taken covered "Want" and Duvall covered "Busy". Lagwagon covered "Want" for their EP A Feedbag of Truckstop Poetry (1999). Gordon Withers covered "Want" for his album Jawbreaker on Cello (2019), which came about from his involvement in the Jawbreaker documentary Don't Break Down (2017). Kerrang! ranked Unfun at number 30 on their list of "The 50 Best Albums From 1990". Cleveland.com ranked "Want" at number 62 on their list of the "100 greatest pop punk songs of all time"; Alternative Press also included it on a shorter list of their own. The track has similarly appeared on best-of lists for Jawbreaker songs by God Is in the TV, Louder, and Stereogum, while "Busy" has appeared on a list by Alternative Press.

== Track listing ==
All songs by Jawbreaker.

Side one
No.	Title	Length
1.	"Want"	3:22
2.	"Seethruskin"	2:24
3.	"Fine Day"	4:27
4.	"Incomplete"	2:41
5.	"Imaginary War"	4:00
6.	"Busy"	4:24

Side two
No.	Title	Length
7.	"Softcore"	3:27
8.	"Driven"	3:30
9.	"Wound"	2:52
10.	"Down"	3:32
11.	"Gutless"	2:53
12.	"Drone"	3:48

CD only tracks (taken from the 1989 7 EP Whack & Blite)
No.	Title	Length
13.	"Lawn"	3:28
14.	"Crane"	3:40
15.	"Eye-5"	5:50

2010 remastered version bonus track
No.	Title	Length
16.	"Busy" (7" mix)	4:30

== Personnel ==
Personnel per sleeve.

Jawbreaker

- Blake Schwarzenbach – guitar, vocals
- Chris Bauermeister – bass
- Adam Pfahler – drums

Production

- Richard Andrews – producer, engineer
- Jawbreaker – producer, insert photos
- Michael James – recording (track 6), engineer (track 6)
- Jeff Martin – mixdown deck, amplifiers
- John Golden – mastering

Design

- Brendan Murdock – front photo
- Wade Graham – back photo
- Knob Sutter – spraypaint
- Paul Robinson – back live photo, insert photos
- Murray Bowles – insert photos
- Gordon Kurtti – insert drawing

== See also ==
- 39/Smooth – the 1990 debut album by contemporaries Green Day, whose drummer, John Kiffmeyer, had left after their own extensive US tour
