= Live 4/30/96 =

Live album by Jawbreaker
- Released: November 2, 1999
- Venues: Warfield, San Francisco
- Genre: Punk rock
- Label: Blackball

Jawbreaker chronology
| Dear You (1995) | Live 4/30/96 (1999) | Etc. (2002) |

Professional ratings
Review scores
| Source | Rating |
|---|---|
| AllMusic | 3.5/5 stars |
| Pitchfork | (6.9/10) |

Live 4/30/96 is a live album by American punk rock band Jawbreaker. It contains three songs that were never released as studio recordings. The show was recorded at the Warfield in the band's native San Francisco.

== Track listing ==
1. "Intro" - 0:10
2. "Jinx Removing" - 3:18 (from 24 Hour Revenge Therapy)
3. "Save Your Generation" - 3:53 (from Dear You)
4. "Ashtray Monument" - 3:14 (from 24 Hour Revenge Therapy)
5. "Accident Prone" - 6:18 (from Dear You)
6. "Boxcar" - 1:52 (from 24 Hour Revenge Therapy)
7. "Gemini" - 3:08 (only on Live 4/30/96)
8. "Parabola" - 3:44 (from Bivouac)
9. "For Esme" - 2:47 (only on Live 4/30/96)
10. "Shirt" - 2:27 (from Dear You reissue)
