= Dear You =

Studio album by Jawbreaker
- Released: September 12, 1995
- Recorded: February–March 1995
- Studios: Fantasy, Berkeley, California
- Genres: Emo; punk rock; post-hardcore
- Length: 51:24
- Label: DGC
- Producers: Rob Cavallo; Jawbreaker

Jawbreaker chronology
24 Hour Revenge Therapy (1994)	Dear You (1995)	Live 4/30/96 (1999)

Singles from Dear You
- 1. "Fireman" Released: August 15, 1995; 2. "Accident Prone" Released: April 1996

Dear You is the fourth studio album by American punk rock band Jawbreaker, released on September 12, 1995, through DGC Records. While promoting their third studio album 24 Hour Revenge Therapy (1994), Jawbreaker was approached by a representative from Geffen Records. After securing management, they had meetings with various label representatives, before circling back to Geffen. Eventually, they signed to them and started recording their major label debut at Fantasy Studios in Berkeley, California, with producer Rob Cavallo. While bassist Chris Bauermeister and drummer Adam Pfahler recorded their respective parts within a few days, frontman Blake Schwarzenbach did his parts over six weeks in February and March 1995.

Mainly described as an emo, and punk rock album, Dear You returns to the darker sound of Jawbreaker's second album Bivouac (1992). Cavallo had given the album its thick sound by layering three different guitar tones from Schwarzenbach, whose playing style was anchored on open-string parts. The lyrics largely revolve around the aftermath of the relationship that was the inspiration for 24 Hour Revenge Therapy. Others, such as "Save Your Generation" and "Chemistry", deal with slacker culture and attending school, respectively. Unlike previous releases, Dear You sees Schwarzenbach sing more instead of scream. His vocals evoked Morrissey, while the overall band was compared to the work of Green Day, Jawbox, and Nirvana.

Dear You was met with generally favorable reviews from music critics, many of whom praised the album's sound and highlighted the lyrics. It peaked at number 22 on the Billboard Heatseekers Albums chart in the United States. There, it sold 40,000 copies by 2002. "Fireman" was released as the album's lead single in August 1995. Jawbreaker then embarked on the Monsters of Jaw tour with Jawbox, where they were met with hostility from the audience who did not like the band's choice to go with a major label. They toured Australia as part of the Summersault festival. "Accident Prone" was released as the next single by April 1996, which was promoted with a supporting slot for the Foo Fighters. Following a fist fight between Bauermeister and Schwarzenbach, Jawbreaker announced their break up in July 1996.

Jawbreaker's fanbase was not receptive to Dear You at the time of its release, criticizing the album's production. The decision to sign with a major label overtook the album's content, becoming the narrative that dominated the press. Following the band's demise, fan perception of the album shifted to a positive one, as the album became an influence on the next wave of emo and pop-punk artists, such as on My Chemical Romance, Saves the Day, and Thrice. Many Dear You songs featured on tribute albums in the ensuing years, and several publications included it on best–of emo album lists from the likes of Kerrang!, NME, and Rolling Stone. After going out of print, Pfahler's label Blackball Records reissued it in 2004. Jawbreaker eventually embarked on a celebratory tour of the album in 2022.

== Background ==
Jawbreaker released their third studio album 24 Hour Revenge Therapy in February 1994 through Tupelo Recording Company and The Communion Label. It was quickly overshadowed by the popularity of Dookie (1994) by Green Day and Smash (1994) by the Offspring, both of which pushed pop-punk and punk rock into the mainstream. In turn, major labels wanted to replicate the success of these two releases with bands of their own, taking acts from the underground. A month before the album's release, vocalist and guitarist Blake Schwarzenbach taped demos of songs that appeared on the band's fourth album, including one of "Jet Black". Jawbreaker began playing venues with capacities over 500 as a result on their seven-week-long tour of the United States in March. Journalist Dan Ozzi, in his book Sellout: The Major-Label Feeding Frenzy That Swept Punk, Emo, and Hardcore 1994–2007 from 2021, said the material on 24 Hour Revenge Therapy strengthened the audience's relationship to Jawbreaker, which in turn made their live performances more intense. The fallout from this meant that the band was more appealing to record label A&R representatives, as the shows were full of hundreds of fans that knew the words of the songs.

During this trek, Jawbreaker debuted five new songs, including as "Accident Prone" and "Basilica" in the vein of their second album Bivouac (1992). "Shirt" and "Sister" also debuted, both romantic songs in the style of 24 Hour Revenge Therapy. They received backlash from readers of the punk zine Maximum Rocknroll and people in the East Bay region of San Francisco, California. The band were already being criticized for touring with Nirvana sometime prior, as well as for dropping their earlier material from their live shows and Schwarzenbach's voice changing as a result of throat surgery. In interviews and interactions with crowd members and friends, the band were being repeatedly asked if they had or were going to sign to a major label. During gigs, Schwarzenbach had to preface "Indictment", which talked about the relationship between music and companies, telling their audiences that they intended to remain independent. This was done nightly, even though industry people attended the shows. While this was occurring, Tupelo and Communion struggled to tackle demand from fans and press. Jawbreaker went on a short, ten-day-long tour on the U.S. West Coast with Jawbox in July 1994. The members of Jawbreaker asked Jawbox about their experiences with major label Atlantic Records. Shortly after this, they recorded a demo of "I Love You So Much It's Killing Us Both".

== Major label meetings ==
Despite hesitancy to join a major label, the members of Jawbreaker contacted friend and Engine 88 drummer Dave Hawkins. He worked with Elliot Cahn and Jeff Saltzman at Cahn-Man Management, a company that worked with both Green Day and the Offspring. Pfahler said they sought advice from Hawkins as they were unsure how to deal with the large volume of calls they were receiving. Saltzman said if the members of Jawbreaker went with them, he could get the band ten offers within the next week. Major label attention towards Jawbreaker led to two sold out shows in Los Angeles, California in September 1994. That same month, the members and Saltzman held meetings with three labels: Captiol, MCA, and Warner Bros. Records. In his 33 1/3 book 24 Hour Revenge Therapy (2018) on the band, author Ronen Givony gave an alternate list, with some A&R representatives: American Recordings, Gary Gersh at Capitol, Geffen Records, MCA, and Lenny Waronker at Warner Bros. Schwarzenbach's housemate Bill Schneider said the band were continually ignoring advances, which reached a point where people were frequently knocking on their door. Despite testing new material during shows, the members' relationships were strained to the point they discussed breaking up. They returned from a tour in Europe lacking inspiration and were struggling to get along with one another. Money was also becoming a factor between them, while their friends were having success in the alternative music gold rush.

Bauermeister said that amidst the strained group dynamic, the prospect of signing to a major label appeared to be a viable option. Schwarzenbach said that if the choice was break up or make one more album, they should aim for a worthwhile deal with creative control and a decent amount of money. In November 1994, Jawbreaker formally parted with Cahn-Man Management. Theyfelt they had reached a peak on the type of album they could make with the small budgets they were given, and wanted to see what they could do on a bigger label. Subsequent meetings went as the band expected with individuals from labels telling Jawbreaker that they were their biggest fan, despite never having heard their music. Schwarzenbach admitted that among the "blow-hards", there were "some very genuine people [interested in the band]." The members were wined-and-dined. Drummer Adam Pfahler saw the meetings as a joke, while Bauermeister was intentionally rude to each industry representative they met. Pfahler served as the band's negotiator, a skill that he learned up from reading the Donald S. Passman book All You Need to Know About the Music Business (1991), which he made notes on while reading. He figured out that the greater sum of money labels invested in Jawbreaker, the higher chance the labels would be combative towards them to get a return on their investment.

Jawbreaker received one of the biggest offers from Mark Kates, a representative of Geffen Records and its imprint DGC Records. He saw them while they were touring with Nirvana and had wanted to work with them since then. Kates and Jawbreaker talked backstage on the tour, with the band able to relate to him, despite Kates being a businessman. They were also attentive to his rock credentials, such as being a disc jockey and friends with the members of Mission of Burma. At the time, Kates was looking out for new artists to sign to the label, but did not attempt to sign Jawbreaker when he became aware of their stance against major labels. In light of this, he remained in contact with them, for the possibility they would change their minds. Upon getting a call from Saltzman, Kates embarked on a flight at the earliest opportunity. He took the band members to a café in San Francisco, where he tried to impress them: "I had the confidence of what was behind me. The company was too strong and significant in that genre." Schwarzenbach liked bands Kates had previously worked with, such as Hole, Nirvana and Sonic Youth, and thought Kates seemed genuine.

Amidst a bidding war between Capitol, Geffen, Interscope Records, and Warner Bros., the members of Jawbreaker ultimately went with Geffen based on a gut reaction Bauermeister had. Before this, Pfahler and Schwarzenbach briefly talked about the decision while walking down a street, when the former shrugged and asked if the latter wanted to sign, Schwarzenbach agreed and settled on Geffen. The initial version of the contract omitted Bauermeister's name. Though trade publication Hits reported that the signing with Geffen happened in December 1994, Givony wrote that it took place on February 17, 1995. The signing deal amounted to a three-album contract, with the members receiving a $1 million advance from the label. In hindsight, Pfahler thought that Geffen misinterpreted that their cult fan base as something that could translate into mainstream success. Jawbreaker was given full creative and production control, and were allowed to do side projects on independent labels should they wish to. They used the advance to update their rehearsal space, purchase a new touring van and pay off the balance for their equipment. The remainder was used as the members' monthly salary for the next year.

== Recording ==
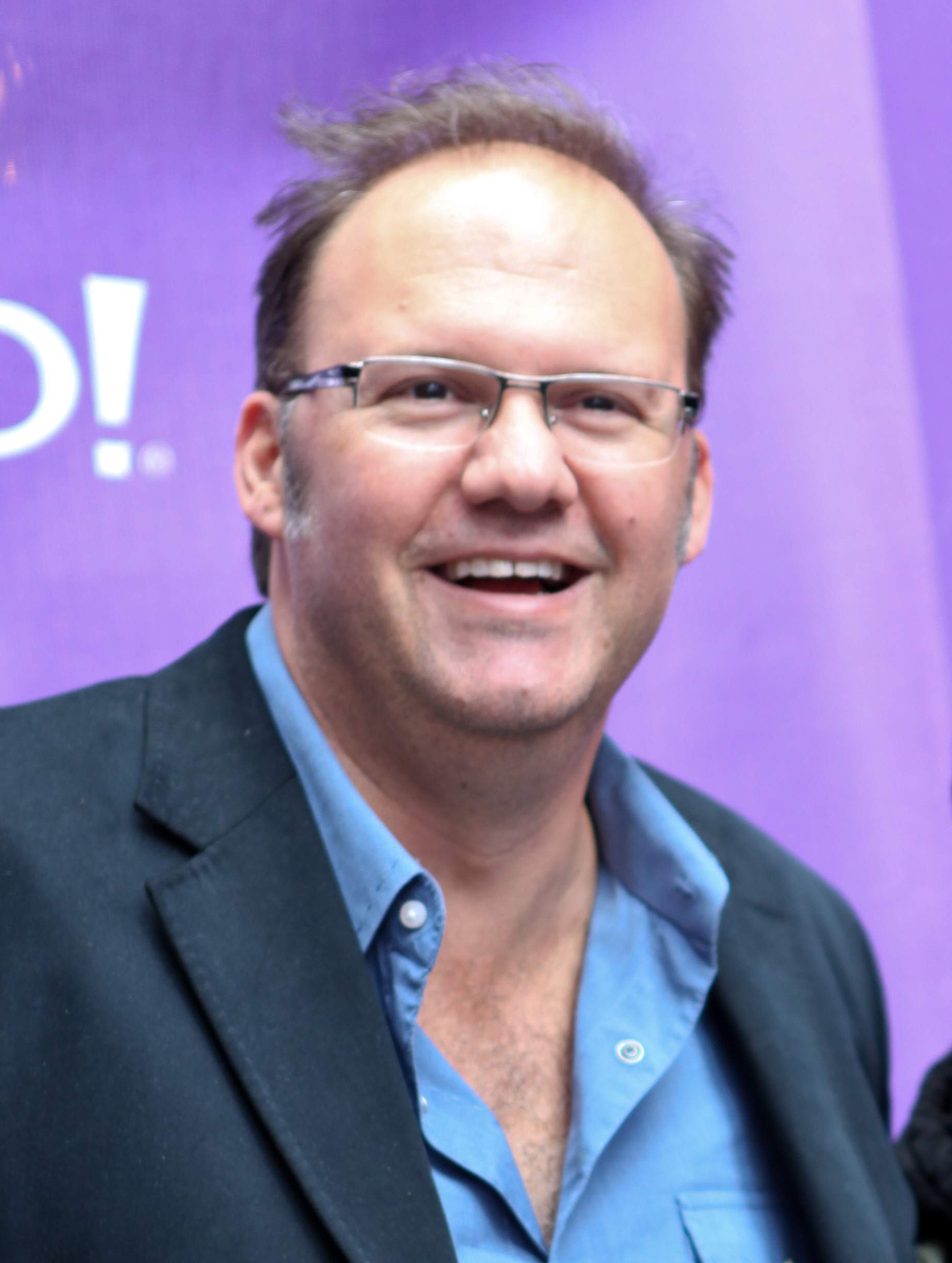
Rob Cavallo, whose career had taken off following his work on Dookie by Green Day, produced Dear You.

In the preceding year, producer Rob Cavallo went from a rookie to a popular figure in the music industry. His career had taken off following his work on Dookie, which spawned five hit singles. Ozzi said he managed to do something previously unaccomplished at that point, taking a somewhat obscure punk band, giving them a radio-friendly edge and thrusting them into rock stardom. When Kates was looking for a producer for Jawbreaker, Cavallo was an obvious choice. He contacted Cavallo and told him they previously opened for Nirvana and were one of Kurt Cobain's favourite artists. Upon listening to demos from Jawbreaker, Cavallo was impressed by their emo sound, a genre he had not previously been exposed to. After meeting with them in San Francisco, he was enamoured with each member's personality and planned to write new material together. Subsequently, Cavallo visited their San Francisco rehearsal area, which was located inside an industrial building, for two weeks. While Cavallo was aware of the band's musicianship, he was unaware of the intrapersonal struggles that were occurring. Despite the cash advance, communication was at its lowest. Schwarzenbach dominated the writing process, making Bauermeister feel like he was being pushed aside.

Jawbreaker recorded their next album at Fantasy Studios in Berkeley, California with Cavallo, the same studio Dookie was made in. Like their previous releases, Bauermeister and Pfahler recorded their respective parts in three days, during the first week of recording. Bauermeister said the sessions had the least involvement from himself, stemming from the tension between each other. He said he had a "bad tendency not to voice concerns. I don't like conflict. So I was just doing my job. I went in, recorded it, and left." When they were done, Bauermeister and Pfahler spent the remaining free time at home. Schwarzenbach, meanwhile, spent six weeks working on the album in February and March 1995. Cavallo's direction was to make the album sound as if the listener was placed in front of Schwarzenbach's guitar amplifier. Schwarzenbach did 12-hour days on guitar tracks and vocal takes with Cavallo. Givony compared this working methodology to Billy Corgan on the Smashing Pumpkins's Siamese Dream (1993) and Kevin Shields on My Bloody Valentine's Loveless (1991). Through trial and error, Cavallo created what he referred to as a "White Hot Sound" recording technique to track Schwarzenbach's playing, whose style relied on open-string riff parts.

Cavallo layered three different guitar tones, which Ozzi said made an audio mixture crafted "to be so thick and rich that it would knock the listener over and carry them off on a tsunami wave of distortion." One such song, "Accident Prone", switched between a clean sound to what Cavallo said was an in-your-face type sound. To do this, they used Schwarzenbach's own Marshall JCM899 amplifier, as well as a 1970s Hiwatt amplifier that Cavallo received from one of the members of Earth, Wind & Fire. Schwarzenbach recorded a lot of harmony vocal tracks for all of the songs, many of which Bauermeister and Pfahler felt were unnecessary. "Boxcar", a track from 24 Hour Revenge Therapy, was re-recorded during the sessions at the suggestion of Cavallo and Kates. When mixing engineer Jerry Finn heard it, he remarked that the original version was superior. Kates had his assistant try to persuade Jawbreaker to include "Boxcar" on the album. When this did not work, he tried Cavallo, who also saw the song's potential. Cavallo mentioned it to the members on two separate occasions and was turned down both times. He then took them out to lunch, where he tried explaining that it could work in the same way "Welcome to Paradise" by Green Day did, a song that was re-recorded for Dookie. After a day of mulling it over, they declined again and Cavallo dropped the subject. Magazine Alternative Press reported at the time that Dear You cost over $75,000 to make, while Givony and Ozzi wrote that it was $200,000. The magazine contrasted the two months for this album with the much smaller budget and three days it took the band to create 24 Hour Revenge Therapy.

== Composition and lyrics ==
=== Overview ===
Musically, Dear You has been mainly described as emo, pop-punk, and punk rock. It has also been tagged as alternative rock, post-hardcore, and grunge, though Chris Norris of Spin discounted the latter, including it on a list of albums that were marketed as grunge despite not being so. While Dear You was the band's second release since Schwarzenbach's throat surgery, he was still getting to used to using his voice so he was not reliant on the loud shouting he did previously. Ozzi felt that Schwarzenbach's new method was "understated and subdued, replacing the occasional bark with a brooding rumble", which was closer to former Smiths frontman Morrissey, rather than hardcore punk vocalist Ian MacKaye. The press also picked up on the Morrissey comparison, while the band were compared to the work of Green Day, Jawbox, and Nirvana. Songs from earlier albums, such as "Bivouac" from Bivouac and "Condition Oakland" from 24 Hour Revenge Therapy, hinted at the gloomy direction that the band explored on Dear You with "Accident Prone" and "Jet Black". Givony said these two tracks evoked the work of Built to Spill, Spiritualized, and Swervedriver instead of the Jawbreaker that made their debut album Unfun (1990) or 24 Hour Revenge Therapy. Dear You returned to the darker tone of Bivouac, though without that album's ambitious songwriting. Ozzi felt that "Accident Prone" and "Jet Black" were both the bleakest tracks on Dear You and the band's discography.

Following the release of Bivouac, the band received a letter from a friend that stated, "you can't dance to pain". Pfahler loved this and wanted to give the album that as its title instead of Dear You. While 24 Hour Revenge Therapy was about a relationship with one person, Dear You dealt with the aftermath of the relationship. In an Alternative Press interview, Schwarzenbach called it the "death album", referring to the issues with his romantic life and the death of his close friends. In a 2022 interview, he said he had gone through years of "wrestling with pretty brutal depression [...] I can see my diagnosis is pretty clearly in a lot of those lyrics". Schwarzenbach said the band were aiming to expand their musical style, or else they would have broken up. Previously, the energy of performing was the driving factor of the band's creativity. Schwarzenbach found it difficult screaming constantly as he explained "[he] had to live the part of the brute in order to sing about it". He decided to sing more instead of scream, and subsequently wrote material in sing-able keys that allowed him better vocal control.

=== Tracks ===
The album's opening track, "Save Your Generation", deals with slacker culture and being a pessimist. It includes a reference to The Hotel New Hampshire (1981) by John Irving when the narrator of the song talks about walking by open windows in an attempt to stave off suicide attempts. In a retrospective review for Gibson, writer Jonah Bayer said the song exemplifies the album's sound: "a melodic pop sensibility that's augmented with buzzing Les Pauls, driving drums, and [...] Schwarzenbach's signature one-liners". "Fireman" consists of a single-note guitar riff in the style of Nirvana. With it, Schwarzenbach reimagined himself as a tidal wave that impacted the coastline that his ex-girlfriend lives on. He explained that while in his residence in Oakland, he wanted to see how "callous I could get. I allowed myself to think really terrible thoughts, and that's just what came out". Richmond Times-Dispatch writer Ryan Self said the song was a "stark and disarming tale of lost love and revenge that'll make you think twice about those old boyfriends or girlfriends". Michael Nelson of Stereogum wrote that in "Accident Prone", Jawbreaker emulated the "weight of a thousand guitars to hammer home a battering ram of a chorus and a stellar, sweeping bridge", with its big sound "heightening the intensity". "Chemistry" is about Pfahler and Schwarzenbach attending Crossroads School in Santa Monica, California. In the mid-tempo song "Million", Schwarzenbach pines for a relationship that could operate like a recording contract. An earlier version of "Lurker II: Dark Son of Night" had a 45-word title with lyrics that revolved around Boba Fett from Star Wars.

Schwarzenbach said "Jet Black" was the "epitome of pathological white angst"; it opens and closes with a sample of Christopher Walken's character from Annie Hall (1977). Mischa Pearlman of Louder wrote that it comes across as a "nihilistic vision of [Walken's] own apocalypse", which complimented the track's evaluation of "psychological and emotional damage". The clip had been the answering message on Pfahler's telephone for some time before they decided to include it in the track. To include it, they had to forfeit 25% of the publishing "and it was worth every cent of those eleven dollars". "Bad Scene, Everyone's Fault" features exes doing better at making out with other people than the narrator at parties, while "Sluttering (May 4th)" has two exes of Schwarzenbach connect over his lameness. The mid-tempo track "Basilica" is followed by the acoustic track "Unlisted Track", which concludes the album. Discussing "Shirt", Pfahler said Schwarzenbach wished they had recorded it in another musical key. "Sister" describes an occasion where Schwarzenbach brought his sister along on tour with the band for two shows. Pfahler recalled that during this, they had a fight in the van and after 30 minutes of not talking "someone turned to his sister and said, 'Well, this is the rock and roll lifestyle. Check it out!'" "Friendly Fire", which acts as a musical bridge between Dear You and its predecessor, deals with Schwarzenbach's paranoia around signing to a major label and seeing it as a fight for survival. The re-recording of "Boxcar" keeps the same tempo and song structure as the original on 24 Hour Revenge Therapy. Ozzi said Cavallo's production style helped to round out the song's rougher exterior, making both Schwarzenbach's guitar and vocals "pop with a warm lucidity."

== Release and touring ==
=== Album promotion and Monsters of Jaw tour ===
Following the making of Dear You, Jawbreaker had six months of downtime until its release. Schwarzenbach complained about the wait, which was driven by Geffen Records' promotional department. Though the band was invited to appear on that year's Lollapalooza, they declined. "Fireman" was released as the lead single from Dear You on August 15, 1995, featuring the album version and an edit of the titular track. "Lurker II: Dark Son of Night" and a cover of the Psychedelic Furs track "Into You Like a Train" (1981) were its B-sides. It was issued to mainstream rock and modern rock radio stations in mid-September 1995. The music video for "Fireman" was released at the start of August 1995. The song was not the band's choice but they agreed to star in the clip. Mark Kohr, who worked on the clips for "Basket Case" and "Longview" (1994) by Green Day, was picked by Saltzman to direct the video, which was filmed at the Fox Oakland Theatre in Oakland, California. Ozzi noted similarities between it and the Green Day clips, in particular, the choice to have three men playing a song in a tiny room, offset by a saturated colour scheme. While Green Day stood out in their videos, the members of Jawbreaker did not in Ozzi's view. Though it showed initial promise at radio, interest in the song quickly dissipated. MTV dropped the video from its rotation after eight airings. Kates chalked this up to the members not being a visually appealing act.

After initially being scheduled for August 15, and then pushed back to August 29, Dear You was eventually released on the Geffen imprint DGC Records on September 12, 1995. An image of a horse is included on the front cover, while a picture of the band is included on the back, which Self said made them come across as "rather menacing". The booklet features an image of a relative of Pfahler's giving the middle finger. To promote the release of Dear You, Geffen Records organized a cruise ship for Jawbreaker and 250 individuals consisting of journalists, contest winners, and associates. It journeyed around the Sausalito, California, harbor and saw the band play a set consisting largely of material from their new album. Though the event appeared to go well, upon docking back at the harbor, attendees were leaving promotional copies of Dear You that were made available. Ozzi wrote that the party served as a preview of the forthcoming reaction that Dear You received, bouncing between bitterness and disinterest.

Jawbreaker went on tour with Jawbox, dubbed the Monsters of Jaw tour. With Geffen's backing, the band could stay in separate hotel rooms while on tour, unlike previous experiences where they snuck people into their rooms. Bauermeister noticed pushback from audiences, which appeared to be smaller than previously. The band members could not tell if the cold response to the new songs was because the audience was not familiar with the material or if they outright disliked it. Some attendees reportedly sat on the floor or turned their backs to Jawbreaker when they played Dear You songs, which gave the band the answer. One such audience member was activist Brian Zero, who handed out anti-Jawbreaker flyers, which he had previously done for Green Day. The flyers, named Just How Much Does Jawbreaker Really Care, used the band as an analogy for Walmart. They encouraged other crowd members to walk out of the show as an act of solidarity for those who felt short-changed by the band. Green Day frontman Billie Joe Armstrong took notice of this and said Jawbreaker received significantly more backlash than his band had. Shows in New York City and Austin, Texas, led to Schwarzenbach being covered in blood and their bass drum being damaged by a bottle, respectively. They avoided playing "Fireman" as they did not want to lean into the marketing angle the label had set up for them, which Bauermeister said hurt then in the long run.

In Jawbreaker's home base of the San Francisco Bay Area, they were banned from punk club 924 Gilman Street, who had previously barred Green Day, for their association with Geffen Records. Highly negative editorials were published in zines, such as Maximum Rocknroll lambasting Dear You without listening to it. Gilman owner Tim Yohannan wrote about the band in the zine, while Screeching Weasel frontman Ben Weasel criticized Jawbreaker after previously defending them. Despite this, the staff at Geffen Records remained positive for the band and the potential Dear You had. Kates, who enjoyed the album, said other people at the label found the album to be pretentious. Eddie Rosenblatt, Geffen's operator, was impressed by it. Schwarzenbach said the album had substantial hype before being issued but was met with zero fanfare afterwards. Press outlets gave the album a single feature and stopped promoting it, with Green Day being named dropped in nearly all of them. The headlines of these stories were also negative, ranging from "Soft Jawbreaker" by The Washington Post to "Big-Label Production Turns Jawkbreaker to Mush" by The Spokesman-Review.

=== Subsequent promotion and Foo Fighters tour ===
Sometime later, "Lurker II: Dark Son of Night" was released as a promotional single with "Million" as its B-side. Jawbreaker played some radio station gigs, such as Live 105. Pfahler said the band felt out of place as they were performing alongside No Doubt, Oasis, and Radiohead. In December 1995 and January 1996, they toured Australia as part of the multi-day Summersault festival, marking the biggest shows in their career to individual crowds over 10,000. They ultimately played to 50,000 collectively at the festival. "Save Your Generation" was released as a promotional single in 1996. By April 1996, "Accident Prone" was being touted as the next single from the album. Nelson said a radio edit version of the track removed the bridge section and "tripled the chorus, rendering one of their best songs repetitive and shitty". Pfahler said the edit ruined the breakdown and was doubtful the track was issued. When asked about making a video for "Accident Prone", Schwarzenbach said that they "couldn't do that [as the] first [video] because it's too heavy" of a choice. Money that was allotted for it was reimbursed into touring, enabling the band to continue promoting the album.

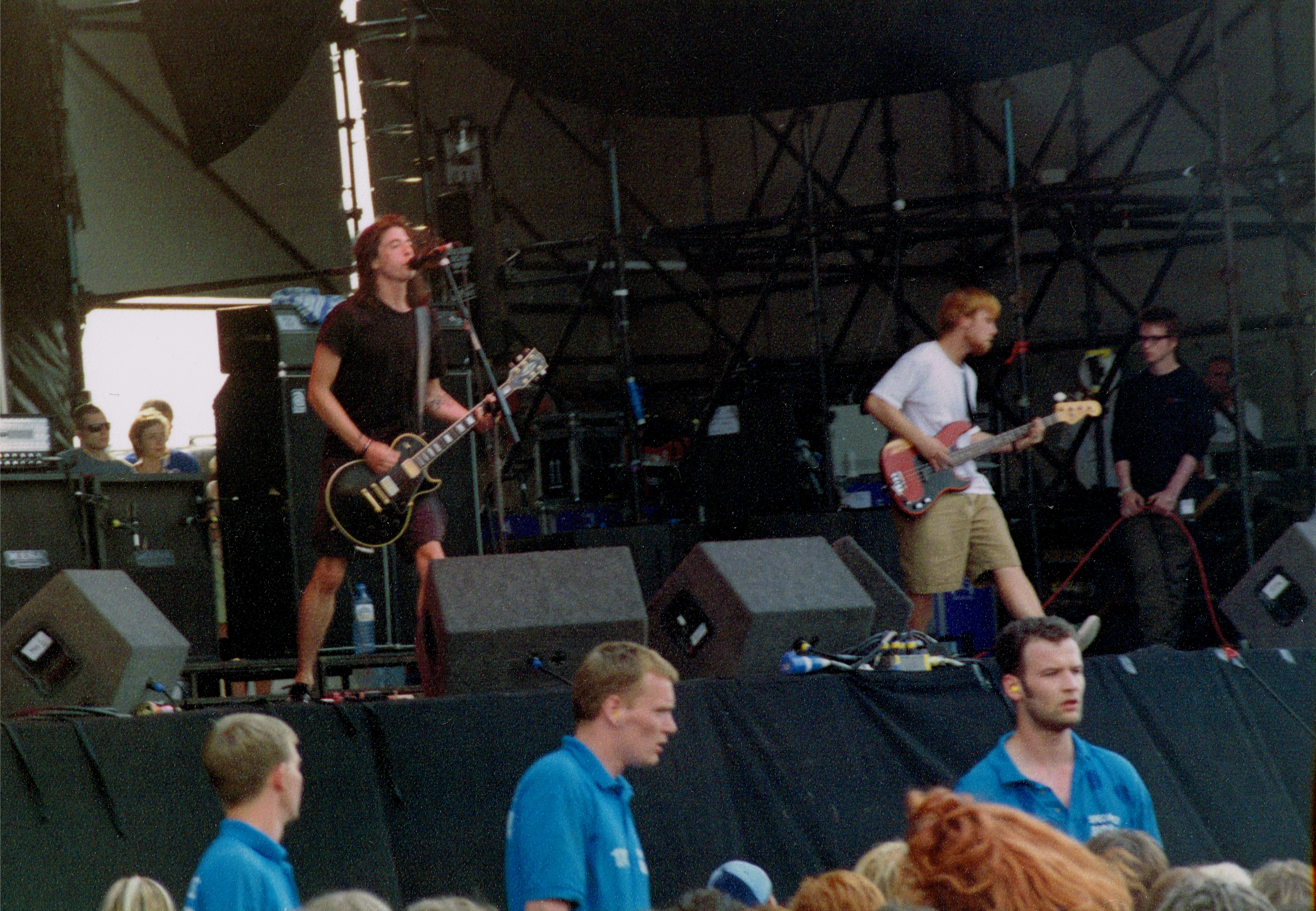
Jawbreaker toured with the Foo Fighters (pictured) in April 1996 prior to breaking up.

In April 1996, Jawbreaker went on tour supporting the Foo Fighters. At this stage, the members of Jawbreaker felt fatigued and were tired of one another. With Dear You and the signing to Geffen Records, Jawbreaker had lost a significant portion of their fan base, at this point performing to festival crowds that were apathetic towards them. They felt they were being humiliated, especially as the Foo Fighters were increasing substantially in popularity. According to Ozzi, Bauermeister was fed up with Jawbreaker being now viewed as "The Blake Schwarzenbach Show", with Schwarzenbach having prominence in photographs and in the "Fireman" video, where he and Pfahler were side-lined. He was asked to cease presswork after making deprecating comments during interviews. Leading up to the tour's conclusion, the members agreed to drive throughout the night to get home. Pfahler had Bauermeister drive him to the airport to get a flight home, and upon returning to the others Bauermeister saw Schwarzenbach relaxing with the members of the Foo Fighters.

In the time that it took Bauermeister to drop off Pfahler, everyone else decided that they were staying the night where they were, which he did not agree with. During a drive in Eugene, Oregon, a spat between Bauermeister and Schwarzenbach evolved into the former stopping the van and attacking Schwarzenbach. The two fell out of the van door, with Schwarzenbach attempting to hit Bauermeister's head, while their roadie and tour manager tried to stop them. After a group of frat members surrounded them and told them to leave, they realised the irrationality of what was happening. On the ensuing drive, the pair discussed the various issues they had with each other. The following day, the band discussed breaking up. Sometime later, they held a meeting at Pfahler's residence where they decided on disbanding. Pfahler, who acted as a mediator, wanted to continue the band, but this was ultimately futile. Jawbreaker played their last show in support of the album on May 16, 1996, in Olympia, Washington. They formally announced their break up on July 4, 1996.

== Reception ==
Professional ratings
Review scores
Source	Rating
AllMusic	4/5 stars
The Austin Chronicle	2.5/5 stars
Entertainment Weekly	B+
MusicHound Rock	4.5/5 stars
Pitchfork	2.1/10 (1995); 2.3/10 (2004)
Punknews.org	5/5 stars
Richmond Times-Dispatch	4/5 stars

Critics generally praised the album's sound. AllMusic reviewer Tim Sendra wrote that it was a "sleek, slick punk-grunge classic that relies as much on clever songwriting and restrained emotions as it does on the group's trademarked high-energy attack". Bayer said that while modern-day releases can be "faulted for not being diverse enough, ironically Dear You follows a distinctive formula that makes it nearly perfect from start to finish". CMJ New Music Monthly writer Allison Stewart referred to it as the band's "finest and most assured record yet, even if comparisons to Green Day are unavoidable". While they are not "as colorful as Green Day", she added that Jawbreaker was thankfully lacking that act's "annoying mall-punk schtick". Reviewing the 2004 reissue, Kyle Ryan of Punk Planet said the album's "big guitars, subdued bass and unraspy vocals" make it stand out from the band's past releases, and while others have since replicated its sound, it has successfully remained "timely nearly a decade after its release". Impact Press editor Craig Mazer noted that "some tracks are more punchy/punky than others, but every song leaves its mark". PopMatters's Jon Goff was indifferent to the music, as "what was once widely considered watered-down punk now sounds more like harmless alternative radio", and Tom Sinclair of Entertainment Weekly said it "isn't quite as stellar" as earlier albums, though it managed to surpass the majority of their contemporaries. Nathan Mauger of The Spokesman-Review disliked the sound, stating that the band seem "Studioized. The new sound is gauzy and soft; it's Jawbreaker, cough-syrup style", and negatively compared Schwartzenbauch's guitar tone to Green Day's, making the tracks "suffer considerably". Greg Beets of The Austin Chronicle went on further, saying that Cavallo's "flat production castrates the band" and the "sad result is one of obfuscated talent in the name of radio friendliness", which Pitchfork writer Christopher Sebela agreed with. Self, meanwhile, said the "recording clarity allow this band to sound more poignant and focused than ever".

Reviewers were appreciative of the album's lyrics and Schwartzenbauch's vocals. Mazer called it a "poetic masterpiece, with Blake crafting emotional songs, allowing the music's energy to feed off the intensity of the lyrics", while Mauger wrote that the majority of the "decipherable songs have a point to make, and do it effectively". Brian Howe of The Fanzine viewed it as a "vibrant, realized mature album" that showcases "rather ingenious wordplay", while Sinclair said the "literate lyrics" made them the "thinking person's Green Day". Goff thought that it quickly descends into "territory that has drawn a lot of fire over the years: lovelorn self-deprecation", and Sebela thought the words "strain[ed] for depth in pursuit of the album's overall sad-sack mood". Punknews.org staff member Johnathon1069 said the lyrical style change was "too dramatic" for him, comparing it to a person at a party "looking out at the scene through somewhat jaded eyes". Beets, meanwhile, said that while some of the "privileged, post-grad prose drips with excess quirk and irony, it rises far and away above the 'intellectual intercourse' passed off as deep by whiners" such as Alanis Morissette. Julie Gerstein of Punk Planet noted that it was "filled with Schwartzenbauch's raspy, sad vocals and charged, emotional (but not emo) lyrics, Dear You encapsulates the hurt and cynicism of a break-up like nothing else". Mauger said the band's previous strength was Schwartzenbauch's "ragged I-just-swallowed-glass voice, but on here, it sounds like it was given the same treatment" as his guitar tone. Joe Gross of Spin wrote that when the album was released, Schwarzenbach's "smoothed-out vocals" came across as a "naked bid for KROQ airplay. Today, it just sounds like he's trying to trade the basement for the big tent without embarrassing himself".

Upon release, Dear You peaked at number 22 on the Billboard Heatseekers Albums chart. It fell under sales estimates, selling 20,000 copies, and saw the label plan to drop the band, until they broke up instead. As of 2002, sales figures stood at 40,000 copies in the U.S. Fellow artist Cali Dewitt, who worked at Geffen, said everyone at the label was enthusiastic about the album. However, when it did not become a commercial success, it "took like less than a week until everyone in the company never uttered their name again". The album was being sold for $16.99; Pfahler recounted in a 2002 interview, "I'm not saying that [price] fucked up our sales, but it certainly didn't help". Soundthesirens founder Billy Ho highlighted four other punk releases from the era that similarly had little success: Nothing Sacred (1996) by Hog; Feel Lucky Punk (1995) by Klover; Clumsy (1994) by Samiam; and Waterdog (1995) by Waterdog. Ho attributed the lack of success for Dear You to it being tonally removed from their past releases.

== Aftermath and legacy ==
=== Related releases, events and reissues ===
After Jawbreaker's split, members of their label team were confused by the lack of success, taking stock of the breakthroughs Nirvana and Green Day had before them. Cahn chalked it up to not having any oversight as to what the general public would latch on to next. Kates claimed responsibility, saying, "We thought we knew how to do this transition [from Green Day to Jawbreaker], but no career is transferable." He realized that Schwarzenbach was not the same as Armstrong, and neither were their respective songs. Kates saw Armstrong as someone who translated his influences into commercial viability, while Schwarzenbach took a lyric-orientated approach to expressing himself. Schwarzenbach said the constant reminders of Green Day and the decision to ride the success of Dookie was detrimental to the perception of Dear You. Geffen Records attempted to get Pfahler and Schwarzenbach to form a new act, though neither person was interested. The label subsequently let the album go out of print. Bauermeister said the idea of signing with them in the first place was to get bigger as a band, but after a year, they found themselves in the same position as before they signed.

Pfahler became Jawbeaker's custodian, setting out to reclaim the recordings that had been given out to different labels over the preceding years. A recording from an April 1996 show was released on Pfahler's label Blackball Records in 1999 under the title Live 4/30/96, marking the band's first live album. When Geffen and its parent company Universal Music Group (UMG) were later asked about acquiring Dear You, a high-level executive claimed to have never heard of the band. Copies of it were being sold for $60 on online auction website eBay, becoming a cult object in the process. In 1998, Pfahler began contacting UMG concerning Dear You. After no success contacting them, he met with Cahn. After paying Cahn with free DVDs from the video rental store that he owned, a deal was brokered. The "Into You Like a Train" cover, alongside previously unreleased outtakes of "Sister", "Friendly Fire" and "Boxcar", were included on the band's sole compilation album, Etc. (2002).

In late 2002, it was announced that after five years of trying, Pfahler licensed Dear You from UMG for $10,000 for a period of 10 years, after not being able to buy the album's rights. As a stipulation that the album was under Blackball Records, Pfahler was forced to pay their former label a higher rate on royalties than what the band would have otherwise received. Following a planned date of mid-2003, Dear You was eventually reissued on CD through Blackball in March 2004. It included the "Fireman" video, alongside "Into You Like a Train", "Sister", "Friendly Fire", "Boxcar" – all taken from Etc. – and "Shirt". Pfahler explained that his participation in this edition amounted to the song selection and design, as the staff at Revolver Distribution and public relations company Hopper did the rest of the work. True Love Records had planned to release the demo version of "I Love You So Much It's Killing Us Both" as a single. This version was eventually released on the compilation of various artists For Callum (2007). Blackball Records pressed Dear You as a two-LP set in 2004, which was re-pressed in 2008. Subsequent editions by DGC, Geffen and UMe have been single-disc editions, such as the 2015 and 2020 pressings.

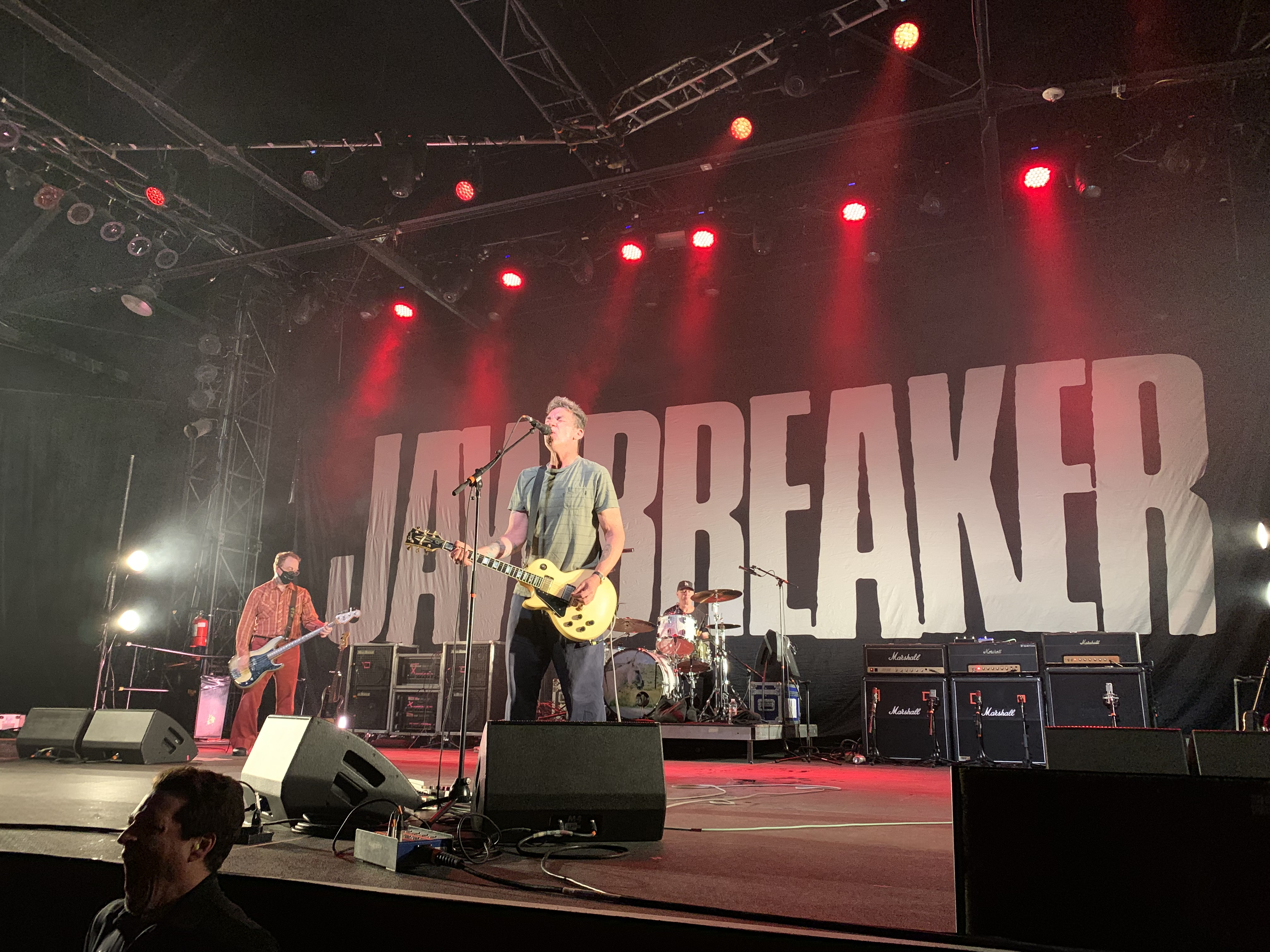
Jawbreaker went on a celebratory tour for Dear You in 2022.

In 2022, Jawbreaker embarked on a delayed 25th anniversary tour for the album. The initial announcement consisted of 10 shows before it was expanded considerably, taking place over the course of three months. They were supported by Jawbox, Team Dresch, Descendents and Face to Face, among others, on various dates of the tour. The Lemonheads played a few of the shows before being replaced by the Get Up Kids. Lemonheads frontman Evan Dando said they were ejected from the tour for "violating a rule that wasn't posted anywhere. We got kicked off the tour for going into the audience before the show".

=== Legacy ===
At the time of Dear You's release, much of the band's pre-existing fanbase did not receive the album well, criticizing its production style. Jawbreaker had made many previous comments to the media declaring their disdain of the major-label music industry, claiming many times that they would not sign to a major label. As such, many fans saw the band signing to DGC Records as a "betrayal" and branded them hypocrites. Some of the band's detractors erroneously blamed Schwarzenbach's surgery as being the core issue, pointing out the change in vocal style in the year between 24 Hour Revenge Therapy and Dear You. Givony explained that fans had no reliable account of the events at the time, only hearsay to go off of, and were unaware that the surgery had happened before the release of Bivouac. Schwarzenbach said this made 24 Hour Revenge Therapy the post-surgery album instead of Dear You, "which was precisely the opposite of how most fans understood it then and now". Pfahler said the story of them leaving an independent label for a major overshadowed the material on the album, as it was "all everyone was talking about". It became the main narrative that the press clung to, that they "betrayed all of [their] people by chasing a buck". The staff at Billboard said the band "seemed destined to become nothing more than a footnote in the ’90s punk revival". After Jawbreaker's breakup, many of the fans changed their opinion to a more positive view. While touring with his next band Jets to Brazil, people approached Schwarzenbach and told them of their admiration for Dear You.

The Billboard staff wrote that the punk scene grew in the years following. Unlike Green Day and the Offspring, MTV had not yet embraced the emo music that Jawbreaker was performing. In the 2000s, emo became a popular venture, with labels like Vagrant Records selling out venues with tour packages in that style. Dear You subsequently has become an influence on the next wave of emo and pop-punk music, particularly Jimmy Eat World, who had a top 10 single with "The Middle" (2001). Gross said some of the lyrics on Dear You foreshadowed the "youthful nookie anxiety of your average Drive-Thru band", while others were "beating Chris Carrabba [of Dashboard Confessional] to the passive-aggressive punch by five years". Dan Bogosian of Consequence considered "Save Your Generation" and "Bad Scene, Everyone's Fault" as influences on the punk aspects of the 2010s emo revival. Chris Conley of Saves the Day, who called Dear You one of his favorite albums, compared the reaction to his vocal change on In Reverie (2003) to what Schwarzenbach went through. Ozzi documented the making of Dear You in his book, after having previously discussed it in a piece about other major label debut albums some years prior. Ryan Ritchie of OC Weekly said the title of "Sluttering (May 4th)" gave birth to Jawbreaker Day. He explained that the band has a "devoted fanbase and the Internet is prime real estate for nerds doing nerdy things. Put the two together and May 4 becomes Jawbreaker Day". Pfahler said he had become aware of the celebration through the message board on Blackball Records' website.

=== Tributes and accolades ===
Several of the songs have been covered for different tribute albums over the years: three for So Much for Letting Go: A Tribute to Jawbreaker Vol. 1 (2003); seven for Bad Scene, Everyone's Fault: Jawbreaker Tribute (2003); and ten for What's the Score? (2015). Gordon Withers covered "Fireman" and "Accident Prone" for his album Jawbreaker on Cello (2019), which came about from his involvement in the Jawbreaker documentary Don't Break Down (2017). Standalone covers of "Accident Prone" by Glacier Veins and "Unlisted Track" by The Story So Far have also been released. In 2022, the labels Lavasocks and Sell the Heart Records collaborated on a tribute album of Dear You, titled Lawbreaker – Dear Who?. Intended to coincide with the album's 25th anniversary, it features covers from the likes of Jonah Matranga and Middle-Aged Queers. In 2025, a youth band from Edmonton, Canada, th3 f4antoms, did a cover of "Million." Saves the Day and Thrice had cited songs from Dear You as influencing one of their albums. My Chemical Romance specifically worked with Cavallo on The Black Parade (2006) after learning of his involvement on Dear You, which had influenced their previous album, Three Cheers for Sweet Revenge (2004). Members of Brand New, Fall Out Boy, the Foo Fighters, Paramore and Sparta have expressed admiration for Dear You.

Dear You has appeared on various best-of emo album lists by Alternative Press, Kerrang!, LA Weekly, NME, and Rolling Stone, as well as by journalists Leslie Simon and Trevor Kelley in their book Everybody Hurts: An Essential Guide to Emo Culture (2007). Similarly, "Accident Prone" appeared on a best-of emo songs list by Vulture. Stereogum named "Jet Black" in their list of "30 Emo Songs: Late 90s & Early 2000s Essentials", stating that its "introspective and nuanced songwriting" acted as a forerunner for Schwarzenbach's subsequent work with Jets to Brazil. Several tracks from the album have similarly appeared on best-of lists for Jawbreaker songs by Alternative Press, God Is in the TV, Louder and Stereogum.

Accolades for Dear You
Publication	List	Rank	Ref.
Kerrang!	The 25 Greatest Emo Albums Ever	25	
LA Weekly	Top 20 Emo Albums in History	20	
NME	20 Emo Albums That Have Resolutely Stood The Test Of Time	1	
Rolling Stone	40 Greatest Emo Albums of All Time	4	

== Track listing ==
All songs written by Jawbreaker.

No.	Title	Length
1.	"Save Your Generation"	3:43
2.	"I Love You So Much It's Killing Us Both"	2:51
3.	"Fireman"	4:06
4.	"Accident Prone"	6:14
5.	"Chemistry"	3:54
6.	"Oyster"	2:38
7.	"Million"	4:20
8.	"Lurker II: Dark Son of Night"	3:37
9.	"Jet Black"	5:13
10.	"Bad Scene, Everyone's Fault"	2:11
11.	"Sluttering (May 4th)"	4:14
12.	"Basilica"	6:05
13.	"Unlisted Track"	2:18

2004 reissue bonus tracks
No.	Title	Length
14.	"Shirt"	3:15
15.	"Into You Like a Train" (The Psychedelic Furs cover)	2:26
16.	"Sister"	4:13
17.	"Friendly Fire"	4:59
18.	"Boxcar" (re-recorded version; originally from 24 Hour Revenge Therapy)	1:56

== Personnel ==
Adapted from liner notes.

Jawbreaker

- Blake Schwarzenbach – lead vocals, guitar
- Adam Pfahler – drums
- Chris Bauermeister – bass

Production

- Rob Cavallo – production
- Jerry Finn – mixing
- Neill King – engineering
- Bob Ludwig – mastering

Artwork

- Daisy Arts – book
- Adam Pfahler – front cover, insert photo
- John Dunne – back cover photo
- Don Lewis – insert live photo
- Jane Bauermeister – insert plaid photo
- John Yates – "Built" (at Stealworks)
- Francesca Restrepo – additional construction

== Charts ==
Chart performance for Dear You
Chart (1995)	Peak position
US Heatseekers Albums (Billboard)	22

== See also ==
- Orange Rhyming Dictionary – the 1998 debut album by Jets to Brazil, Schwarzenbach's next project after Dear You
- Pinkerton – the 1996 album by Weezer, also released by DGC, which similarly did not see acclaim until years after its release
- Clarity – the 1999 album by Jimmy Eat World that saw them being dropped by a major label
