= 24 Hour Revenge Therapy =

Studio album by Jawbreaker
- Released: February 7, 1994
- Recorded: May and August 1993
- Studios: Steve Albini's house, Chicago, Illinois; Brilliant, San Francisco, California
- Genres: Punk rock; pop-punk; emo
- Length: 37:11
- Labels: Tupelo; Communion
- Producer: Jawbreaker

Jawbreaker chronology
| Bivouac (1992) | 24 Hour Revenge Therapy (1994) | Dear You (1995) |

24 Hour Revenge Therapy is the third studio album by American punk rock band Jawbreaker, released on February 7, 1994, through Tupelo Recording Company and Communion Label. Before the release of their second studio album, Bivouac (1992), frontman Blake Schwarzenbach developed a polyp on his vocal cords. While on tour in Europe, he went to a hospital; upon returning to the United States, the band took up day jobs. Recording sessions for their next album were held at Steve Albini's house in Chicago, Illinois, across three days in May 1993. While on tour, they listened to tapes they made of the sessions; Schwarzenbach was unhappy with the recordings. Three songs were subsequently recorded in a single day at Brilliant in San Francisco, California, in August 1993 with Billy Anderson.

24 Hour Revenge Therapy received generally favorable reviews from music critics, some of whom praised the songwriting. Described as a blend of their traditional punk rock and pop-punk sound, it harkened back to the simplistic arrangements of Jawbreaker's debut studio album, Unfun (1990). They supported Nirvana on their US tour, which earned them backlash from members of the punk community, and then went on a stint with J Church prior to the release of the album. Jawbreaker supported them with a seven-week US trek, a West Coast tour with Jawbox, where further backlash followed, and a stint in Europe at the end of 1994. 24 Hour Revenge Therapy has been included on best-of lists for pop-punk and emo by the likes of Alternative Press and Rock Sound; Chris Conley of Saves the Day and Rise Against had expressed admiration for the album.

== Background and writing ==
While Jawbreaker was touring across the United States, frontman Blake Schwarzenbach had developed a polyp on his vocal cords. They had planned to get their roadie, Raul Reyes, to sing for the remainder of the trek. After a single show where Reyes could not recall the lyrics, Schwarzenbach started singing again. The band then embarked on a tour of Europe; during it, he coughed up blood. As they were unable to fly home due to fog, Schwarzenbach went to a hospital in October 1992. As he was recovering, the rest of the band spent time in London with Lookout! Records staff member Christy Colcord. After leaving the hospital, Schwarzenbach was instructed not to talk or drink for a period of five days. His first show post-surgery saw his vocals being altered two octaves higher. A month prior to this, Schwarzenbach said that the band was eager to return to the studio to record, having written ten new songs. They had recorded their second album, Bivouac, a year ago, though it had yet to be released. Drummer Adam Pfahler explained that because a significant amount of time had elapsed since recording, many of the songs were no longer part of their live shows. While they had performed nearly half of the material that would end up on their third album by October 1992, Bivouac only saw release two months later.

Bivouac was a darker-sounding release that took inspiration from the Midwestern and Washington, D.C. post-punk scenes. Author Andrew Earles wrote in his book, Gimme Indie Rock: 500 Essential American Underground Rock Albums 1981–1996 (2014), that the album earned Jawbreaker fans in the American underground from post-hardcore to alternative and indie rock. After returning to the US, bassist Chris Bauermeister stayed at the band's residence on Sycamore Street in San Francisco, California, as Pfahler moved to Albion Street in Los Angeles, California, and Schwarzenbach moved to Oakland, California. Bauermeister worked at a toy store, and Pfahler spent time running a video store, as Schwarzenbach wrote new material alone and served as a librarian. The members met up and held practice sessions in the basement of a club. The material that Schwarzenbach came up with revolved around locations, relationships, and people; Ronen Givony, who wrote the 2018 33 1/3 book on the band, said that while the tracks on Bivouac were "figurative, the new songs were confessional, unguarded, [and] diaristic". Bauermeister and Pfahler acknowledged that Bivouac was a collaborative effort between the three of them, which contrasted with this new set of songs that were solely Schwarzenbach's creation. Prior to recording their next album, they had all of the material for it fully planned out and already had a sequence for it. Gary Held of Revolver Distribution lent the band $2,000 to cover the cost of recording as well as food, lodging, and gas. They were prepared to the point where they performed what would be the album in order for Held.

== Production ==
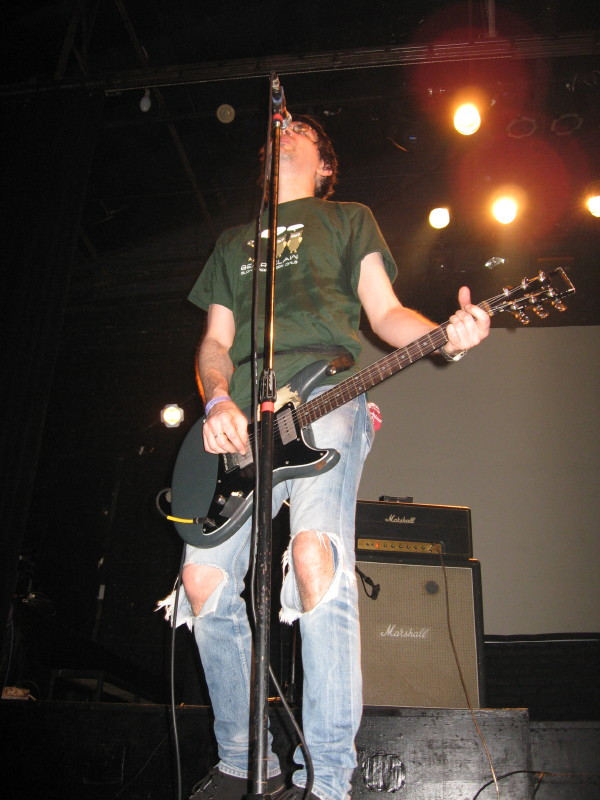
Steve Albini served as the engineer during the making of the album.

Jawbreaker began their van trip from San Francisco to engineer Steve Albini's house in Chicago, Illinois, on May 14, 1993, arriving a few days later. 24 Hour Revenge Therapy was mainly recorded at Albini's residence across three days that same month. Albini had built up a reputation as an engineer recording revered albums by the likes of Nirvana and PJ Harvey, alongside the works of acts that members of Jawbreaker admired, such as Big Black and the Jesus Lizard. Though he was not that familiar with the band, he was aware of them and considered them "one of the few punk bands [...] that had a more melodic sensibility". Albini had upgraded the recording console at his house from 8-track to 24-track prior to this. As such, he recorded a large number of bands in a short time period in order to pay the bill for the equipment. Upon arriving, Schwarzenbach remarked that the Jesus Lizard were practicing in Albini's basement; Jawbreaker moved all of their gear into that location, which was where they would be recording. Pfahler said on the first day, he and Bauermeister had started taping basic tracks at 3 p.m. and were finished by 6 p.m.

The day after, Schwarzenbach tracked his guitar lines and vocals; the next day, they began the mixing process. Two songs into the session, the tape machine became faulty and caught fire. Any further work was halted without a working machine; another act was scheduled to work with Albini at the weekend. A national tour was planned to begin after sessions wrapped, though the initial first show in Dayton, Ohio, was cancelled as Jawbreaker remained in Chicago. On 25 May 1993, they restarted mixing as the machine was fixed, working from 9 a.m. to almost midnight. Albini ultimately billed the band $1,032 for the three full days of recording and mixing. The next day, they went to the residence of Screeching Weasel frontman Ben Weasel and listened to the album. Pfahler later regretted doing this, stating that they were "too close to it. We had no distance [...] we didn't have it in our head right". Schwarzenbach said: "There's always that point where you can really freak yourself out, and we did". They then embarked on the When It Pains It Roars tour through to July 1993. After 30 shows, they eventually relistened to the tapes, which Schwarzenbach was not satisfied with.

After the tour concluded, they spent a day with Billy Anderson, tracking at Brilliant Studio in San Francisco, California. The band self-produced the proceedings, while Anderson served as the engineer. During this, "The Boat Dreams from the Hill" and "Boxcar" were re-recorded, "Do You Still Hate Me?" and "Jinx Removing" were re-mixed, and "Condition Oakland" was recorded. "The Boat Dreams from the Hill" was redone as the song did not have enough pauses in the music for Schwarzenbach to sing over. In addition, the pick slide and lead guitar part that opens the track was swapped for Pfahler's drums. "Boxcar" was also remade, with an increase in tempo. They altered those songs based on live performances sometime prior. Around this time, he wrote "Condition Oakland", which he felt was "a good summation" of recording music; as they had been playing it on tour, they opted to record it for their next album. Making the track at Brilliant was "pretty perfect" due to the studio's large size, making it "kind of a cavernous song." A sample of Jack Kerouac and Steve Allen was recorded for it by playing a cassette of performing, done by pointing a Shure SM57 microphone at a boom box speaker. Pfahler said the session with Anderson cost $500. As Albini preferred not to be credited, the engineer role was listed as Fluss in the album's booklet, which was the name of his cat. He reasoned that as Jawbreaker composed and played "and made the decisions [...] [they're] doing all the work, I'm sort of part of the equipment". For the 20th anniversary version of the album, he is credited as doing the recording, while Fluss is still listed as the engineer. John Golden mastered the album at K-Disc in Hollywood, California.

== Composition and lyrics ==
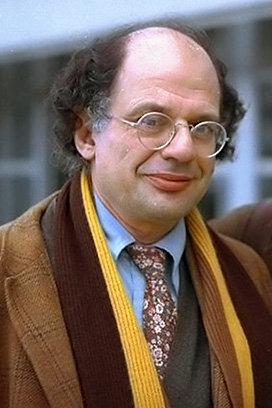
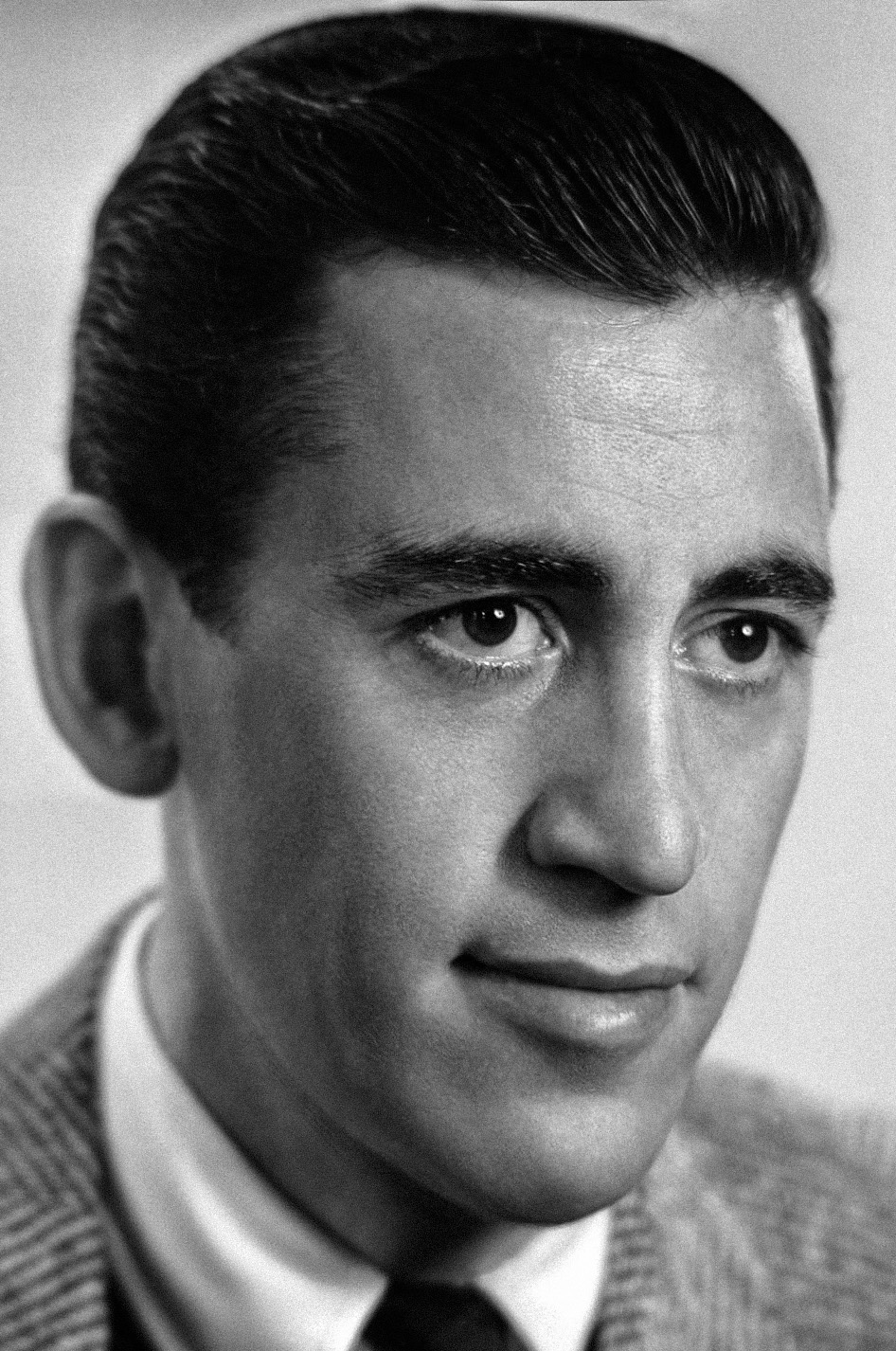
Schwarzenbach's narrative lyrical style has been compared to American poets Allen Ginsberg (left) and J. D. Salinger (right).

=== Overview ===
Musically, the sound of 24 Hour Revenge Therapy has been described as punk rock, pop-punk, and emo. Dan Fidler of Spin said it was "composed of short, tight arrangements", centered around Pfahler's "furious drumming" and Bauermeister's "barreling bass". The latter realized "the value of pulling back and not doing fills every chance I got, but trying to put them in useful places and places that made sense." Schwarzenbach's vocals were compared to Paul Westerberg of the Replacements and Richard Butler of the Psychedelic Furs. The material on the album was Schwarzenbach-written, instead of the more collaborative efforts on Bivouac. The latter album saw the band lean towards a more progressive sound, while 24 Hour Revenge Therapy had simplified arrangements, closer to their debut studio album, Unfun (1990). Schwarzenbach highlighted five albums that he listened to while creating 24 Hour Revenge Therapy: Bad Moon Rising (1985) by Sonic Youth; World Outside (1991) by the Psychedelic Furs; No Pocky for Kitty (1991) by Superchunk; Something Vicious for Tomorrow (1992) by Treepeople; and The Problem with Me (1993) by Seam.

Schwarzenbach explained that 24 Hour Revenge Therapy dealt with a single relationship he experienced. The album's lyrics have been compared to those of the Replacements. Journalist Dan Ozzi, in his book Sellout: The Major-Label Feeding Frenzy That Swept Punk, Emo, and Hardcore 1994–2007 (2021), said Schwarzenbach separated himself from his pop-punk contemporaries by entwining cleverness, allegories, and self-observation into the songs' lyrics. The words avoided the literary vagueness of their previous releases in favor of directness. The band's uneasy mindset towards the strict attitude and rules-based philosophy of the punk scene was documented in "Indictment", "Boxcar", and "West Bay Invitational". Givony wrote that the album largely details a story "familiar to every young person who moves to a new city, makes friends, falls in love, and reluctantly grows up"; the first three tracks fall out of this remit, as they are a send-off to a music environment that "had outlived its novelty, interest, or usefulness". Ozzi felt that Schwarzenbach's narrative form was in line with popular Great American writers such as Allen Ginsberg, Kerouac, and J. D. Salinger. Schwarzenbach was able to study their respective works when he was a librarian. Kerouac appears twice on the album, as a namedrop in "Boxcar" and the aforementioned sample heard in "Condition Oakland". Arin Keeble, in his piece on Jawbreaker collected in The Routledge Companion to Music and Modern Literature (2022), said both tracks employ literary imagery to repel against the conventions of punk rock.

=== Songs ===
The opening track to 24 Hour Revenge Therapy, "The Boat Dreams from the Hill", was inspired by Schwarzenbach seeing a boat on a hill while driving in Santa Cruz. It switches viewpoints from the unfixable boat drifting on water to a pensioner building the boat and losing one's voice. Givony said the boat was used as a metaphor for "potential – a container for 'every man's' wishes". "Indictment" levies criticism towards major labels, not caring about other people's opinions on songwriting. Pfahler said the song's full title was "Scathing Indictment of the Pop Industry", tackling the process behind music distribution. Portions of his drum parts on it were influenced by Sugar and Dave Grohl of Nirvana. "Boxcar" was written while on the side of a road in France as their touring van was being searched and deals with the concept of selling out in the punk rock scene. Keeble said the title evoked switchyards and trains, which are mentioned via Kerouac in one of the later songs on the album, "Condition Oakland". Ozzi saw "Boxcar" as the most conventional punk rock song out of all of the band's songs thanks to its three-chord structure, atypical of punk bands from the San Francisco Bay Area. Part of the lyrics namecheck El Sobrante, California, shortened to "El Sob", located 15 miles outside of San Francisco. Keeble remarked that the track's allusion to Kerouac was framed as a markedly "unpunk activity", echoing the criticism of the rest of the lyrics, due to his alliance with the Beat Generation. Schwarzenbach employs a one-two-three-four count-in heard in numerous punk rock tracks, particularly by the Ramones. "Outpatient" was written following Schwarzenbach's hospitalization; Pfahler thought it sounded similar to the tracks on Bivouac. Schwarzenbach said it was a series of vignettes of his vocal surgery, though he only had around ten thoughts or photographs to pick from as he was incapacitated for a lot of the events.

"Ashtray Monument" sees Schwarzenbach discuss his parents' divorce and his perspective in its aftermath. He said it was about life in the Mission District, San Francisco, specifically the band's apartment on Sycamore Street. Deciphering the title, Givony wrote that an "ashtray monument is one that has been allowed to grow beyond recognition: an image of surrender, or extreme, unhealthy solitude". It begins with an abrasive guitar part and several drum fills, which saw Pfahler emulating the style of Cheap Trick drummer Bun E. Carlos. "Condition Oakland" tackles the theme of loneliness, as well as the difficulties of being an artist. The song was influenced by the music of Swervedriver and Treepeople being in frequent rotation for Schwarzenbach, in which he attempted to sing like the latter's frontman Doug Martsch. It is in 3/4 time and includes a sample of Kerouac reciting "October in the Rail Earth", included in Lonesome Traveler (1960). It was recorded for Poetry for the Beat Generation (1959), where Kerouac is backed by Allen on piano. Keeble said the latter's rambling playing generates "a discordant effect that enhances the song’s lyrics of loneliness and desperation." Several of the lines in the sample detail parts of the Bay Area; Keeble also wrote that the mentions of writing and reading in the lyrics were a reference to "Boxcar". "Ache" is a leftover from the Bivouac sessions; for 24 Hour Revenge Therapy, Schwarzenbach played an anthemic-sounding guitar running through a RadioShack amplifier. Unlike the Bivouac version, the 24 Hour Revenge Therapy rendition uses vocal overdubs to enact a call-and-response section. Givony said it dealt with "thinking things through, and not caring if you're being lied to, so long as those lies come with a veneer of intimacy".

"Do You Still Hate Me?" is a love song about the aftermath of a relationship; its chorus consists of unanswered questions. "West Bay Invitational" talks about a house party and existentialism. Keeble said the topic recalled The Great Gatsby (1925) by F. Scott Fitzgerald, placed against an unforgettable caricature of "elitism, division and pretension." He compared aspects from these two things, such as people from either side of the Bay Area in the song to the gathering of a crowd from the East Egg and West Egg regions in the book. Discussing "West Bay Invitational", Pfahler said he and Schwarzenbach shared an apartment on the top floor, with Bauermeister, Reyes, and Hahn in another apartment opposite them. In early 1991, the band decided to throw a massive party, attended by various people from bands, such as Econochrist and Samiam, and labels, like Boner Records and Revolver Distribution. Schwarzenbach said aspects of the event and the symbolism of it ended up in "West Bay Invitational". A girl is referenced in the lyrics as being from Oakland, when she was actually from Arkansas. The person in question was a friend of Ben Sizemore of Econochrist, who previously toured with Jawbreaker in 1990. "Jinx Removing" details a relationship at its end while trying to compromise in holding it together. Schwarzenbach felt disconnected from his girlfriend, despite them living 20 city blocks apart; Bauermeister said it shared a similar structure to "The Boat Dreams from the Hill". Schwarzenbach said it was about the "Santeria cult in domestic American relationships". The album's closing track, "In Sadding Around", was known as "New Slow Sad" during its initial live performances. The final title comes from Schwarzenbach's roommate, Bob McDonald; Pfahler said that Schwarzenbach asked McDonald what he had planned to do one day, to which McDonald responded that he would be "in sadding around all day". Discussing the track, Pfahler said that "underneath it all there is this hope, that even with all of this devastation around, your narrator is still saying [positive] things".

== Release and touring ==
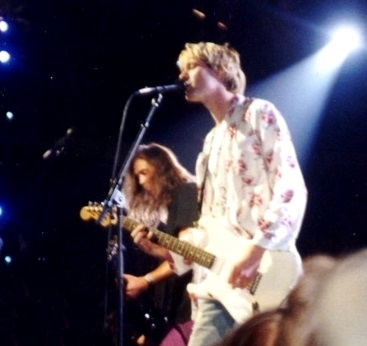
Jawbreaker received backlash for supporting Nirvana (pictured) on their 1993 In Utero tour.

=== Touring with Nirvana and initial backlash ===
While on the When It Pains It Roars tour, dubbed copies of 24 Hour Revenge Therapy had circulated among Jawbreaker's fans. Givony referred to this as an "uncommon early example of the pre-Internet album leak". In October 1993, Schwarzenbach returned to his apartment in Oakland to find that one of his housemates, Bill Schneider, had taken a message and phone number for John Silva of Gold Mountain Management. After contacting the company, Silva offered Jawbreaker the opportunity to support Nirvana on tour. It was the result of Cali DeWitt, who was babysitting Frances Bean Cobain for Nirvana's frontman, Kurt Cobain. DeWitt had seen Jawbreaker a few times previously and suggested them to Cobain when the Wipers had to drop out. Pfahler and Schwarzenbach had been impressed by Nirvana when they saw them live in Los Angeles two years prior. Jawbreaker subsequently appeared on the In Utero tour, playing to 3,000–6,000 people per night between October 19 and October 26. During the first day, the band had parked their van next to ten buses that were part of Nirvana's entourage. Pfahler said it was not a "rock-star moment. It was one of those, oh Jesus Christ, what have we gotten ourselves into?". The first show in Albuquerque saw them play to five thousand people, a slim number of whom knew Jawbreaker; tour posters and adverts in newspapers incorrectly retained the Wipers as the opening act.

Though they received major backlash from members of the punk community for taking the support slot, the members of Jawbreaker did not regret the experience. Ozzi said these shows strengthen Schwarzenbach's disdain for corporate rock music, defiant against signing to a major label. Upon going back to San Francisco, the members found that rumors had been spread about them, including the notion that they received a $500 budget for food each day. Ozzi said the reality was that they received a free meal and $500 for each gig they played on the trek. Pfahler said an individual from the punk zine Maximum Rocknroll asked if he made $50,000 last year. He was surprised by this, explaining that there was no money in his bank account and he was paying $650 for an apartment. Pfahler remarked that people must have thought they were shifting a large amount of albums by virtue of being a cult act. He estimated that artists on Fat Wreck Chords were selling tenfold that amount that Jawbreaker was. Spurred on by their audience's growing fears that the members were yearning for rock stardom, a backlash was forming against Jawbreaker. Schwarzenbach commented on this, saying that people thought they were going to be on Geffen Records purely because they toured with Nirvana. Attraction from major labels in the East Bay region of San Francisco continued, with contemporaries Green Day having signed earlier in the year to Reprise Records. Jawbreaker then toured across the US with J Church; the San Francisco date erupted into a fight due to a heckler, which saw the police being called in.

=== Album promotion and further backlash ===
AllMusic states the release date of 24 Hour Revenge Therapy, which was done through Tupelo Recording Company and The Communion Label, to be February 7, 1994, while Givony gives the date of February 15, 1994. He wrote that the artwork was a "study in contrasts: deadly serious and playfully lighthearted; vivid, realistic color next to minimalist abstraction". He went on to express that it summarizes the album's "contents: disaster and depression, but also persistence, stoicism, and humor; solitude and isolation". The artwork is a collage of items, which Pfahler created in his kitchen over the course of an afternoon; it consists of a grid of four squares. The top-left box is a black-and-white photograph of a pocket watch found in Hiroshima, Japan, after an atomic bomb had impacted the city. The top-right square features three safety matches grouped together on top of unrolled cigarette filters. The bottom-left box is an image of a cannon pointing down at a canyon, taken from a Looney Tunes Road Runner short. The bottom-right square consists of foil from a cigarette packet; the album's title is included in maroon-colored letters, referencing the tips of the matches in the top-right box. The squares are bordered by various tablets and pills taken from a drug almanac, such as Paxil, Prozac and Zoloft. Pfahler took black-and-white images that accompany each track in the booklet, including a stack of pennies for "Indictment", train tracks for "Boxcar", and candles for "Jinx Removing".

24 Hour Revenge Therapy was quickly overshadowed by the popularity of Dookie (1994) by Green Day and Smash (1994) by the Offspring, both of which pushed pop-punk and punk rock into the mainstream, while the prevalence of grunge was receding. In the aftermath of this, Jawbreaker started playing 500-capacity venues; they embarked on a seven-week US tour from March 1994, titled the Come Get Some tour. Backlash continued to grow from readers of Maximum Rocknroll and people in the East Bay. The band was still being lambasted for touring with Nirvana, as well as for dropping the Unfun songs from their live repertoire and the change of voice from Schwarzenbach after his surgery. It reached a point where, during one show, a member of the crowd frequently tried to spit in Schwarzenbach's mouth. The June 1994 issue of Maximum Rocknroll was devoted to independent and major labels; Weasel spent part of his column in the zine defending the band. Jawbreaker went on a short, ten-day tour on the US West Coast with Jawbox. They closed out the year with a tour of Europe in November 1994.

In October 2014, Pfahler's label, Blackball Records, issued 24 Hour Revenge Therapy. It featured alternative takes of "The Boat Dreams from the Hill", "Boxcar", "Do You Still Hate Me?", and "Jinx Removing", alongside two outtakes, "First Step" and "Friends Back East". The latter two were previously included on the band's first compilation album, Etc. (2002). The alternative takes of "Boxcar" and "Do You Still Hate Me?" were made available for streaming through the band's website in the lead-up to the reissue. In addition to this, footage of the Mission District from 1992 was compiled into a music video for "Boxcar", directed by Pfahler. Blackball Records has since re-pressed it on vinyl in 2015, 2017, 2021, 2022, and 2023.

== Reception and legacy ==
Professional ratings
Review scores
| Source | Rating |
|---|---|
| AllMusic | 4/5 stars |
| Kerrang! | 4/5 stars |
| MusicHound Rock | 4/5 stars |
| Pitchfork | 9.1/10 |

24 Hour Revenge Therapy was met with generally positive reviews from music critics, many of which touched on the emotional nature of the music and lyrics. Will Dandy of Punk Planet said Schwarzenbach's lyrics got "more confusing and metaphoric" with each release. Despite this, he called the music "pulsing, [...] with a spontaneous feel". Ozzi remarked that Schwarzenbach's style was at points "saccharine, but this emotional vulnerability helped build upon the band's cult-like following". AllMusic reviewer Mike DaRonco found the band to "deal with their endeavors through music instead of wallowing in them, making this record not entirely bleak." Pitchfork contributor Brandon Stosuy said that the album provided "some of the most indelible examples of punk music crammed with emotion. These are life-changing songs that, a couple decades later, still give goosebumps." Louder writer Mischa Pearlman called it a "dark, late night cigarette of a record, one full of hope and despair and jaded existentialism". Author Barry M. Prickett, writing in MusicHound Rock: The Essential Album Guide (1999), saw it as the "stepping stone to a big league [major label] signing. The songs are once again shorter and the ideas a bit more concise."

In the aftermath of Dookie and Smash, Jawbreaker and 24 Hour Revenge Therapy kept the spotlight of punk in the mainstream alongside other 1994 releases, such as Stranger Than Fiction by Bad Religion and Let's Go by Rancid. By the release of Givony's book in 2018, 24 Hour Revenge Therapy had sold 70,000 copies. Joe Gross of Spin said that Bivouac and 24 Hour Revenge Therapy were "two of early emo's key documents". Discussing its legacy, Givony wrote that it acted as a time capsule of a period before the "internet and email became ubiquitous [...] of the last moment when artists and fans genuinely cared whether a big corporation or a small indie label released their music". Vagrant Records founder Rich Egan considers it his favorite album; Andy Greenwald, author of Nothing Feels Good: Punk Rock, Teenagers, and Emo (2003), wrote that Egan's "reasons read like a band-by-band blueprint" for the label's success in the early 2000s. Brian Stout of PopMatters said the way that Joyce Manor wove stories of living in Torrance, California, throughout Never Hungover Again (2014) was akin to Jawbreaker detailing the Bay Area on 24 Hour Revenge Therapy.

24 Hour Revenge Therapy has been included on a best-of list for pop-punk by Rock Sound and for emo by Alternative Press. NME slotted "Jinx Removing" on their list of the ten best emo songs from the 1990s. Rise Against cited the album as one of their 12 key influences, alongside works by Bad Religion, Dead Kennedys, and Fugazi. Josh Caterer of the Smoking Popes, Chris Conley of Saves the Day, and Craig Finn of the Hold Steady have expressed admiration for the album. Several of the songs have been covered for different tribute albums over the years: one for So Much for Letting Go: A Tribute to Jawbreaker Vol. 1 (2003); five for Bad Scene, Everyone's Fault: Jawbreaker Tribute (2003); and five for What's the Score? (2015). Gordon Withers covered "The Boat Dreams from the Hill", "Boxcar", "Ashtray Monument", and "Ache" for his album Jawbreaker on Cello (2019), which came about from his involvement in the Jawbreaker documentary Don't Break Down (2017).

Accolades for 24 Hour Revenge Therapy
| Publication | List | Rank | Ref. |
|---|---|---|---|
| LA Weekly | Top 20 Emo Albums in History | 13 | |
| Rock Sound | The 51 Most Essential Pop Punk Albums of All Time | 34 | |
| Stereogum | The Top 20 Steve Albini-Recorded Albums | 7 | |

== Track listing ==
All songs by Blake Schwarzenbach.

| No. | Title | Length |
|---|---|---|
| 1. | "The Boat Dreams from the Hill" | 2:39 |
| 2. | "Indictment" | 2:49 |
| 3. | "Boxcar" | 1:54 |
| 4. | "Outpatient" | 3:41 |
| 5. | "Ashtray Monument" | 3:04 |
| 6. | "Condition Oakland" | 5:17 |
| 7. | "Ache" | 4:14 |
| 8. | "Do You Still Hate Me?" | 2:52 |
| 9. | "West Bay Invitational" | 3:58 |
| 10. | "Jinx Removing" | 3:13 |
| 11. | "In Sadding Around" | 3:54 |

2014 reissue bonus tracks

| No. | Title | Length |
|---|---|---|
| 12. | "The Boat Dreams from the Hill" (alternate take) | 2:42 |
| 13. | "Boxcar" (alternate take) | 2:00 |
| 14. | "Do You Still Hate Me" (alternate take) | 2:52 |
| 15. | "Jinx Removing" (alternate take) | 3:15 |
| 16. | "First Step" (outtake) | 3:26 |
| 17. | "Friends Back East" (outtake) | 2:15 |

== Personnel ==
Personnel per booklet, except where noted.

Jawbreaker

- Blake Schwarzenbach – guitar, vocals
- Chris Bauermeister – bass
- Adam Pfahler – drums

Additional personal

- Jack Kerouac – vocal sample
- Steve Allen – piano

Production and design

- Jawbreaker – producer
- Steve Albini (credited as Fluss) – engineer
- Billy Anderson – engineer
- John Golden – mastering
- Don Lewis – playing photos
- Adam Pfahler – other photos
- John Yates – layout

== See also ==
- In Utero – the 1993 album by Nirvana, which Albini recorded shortly before 24 Hour Revenge Therapy
