= Don Lewis =

American musician and engineer (1941–2022)

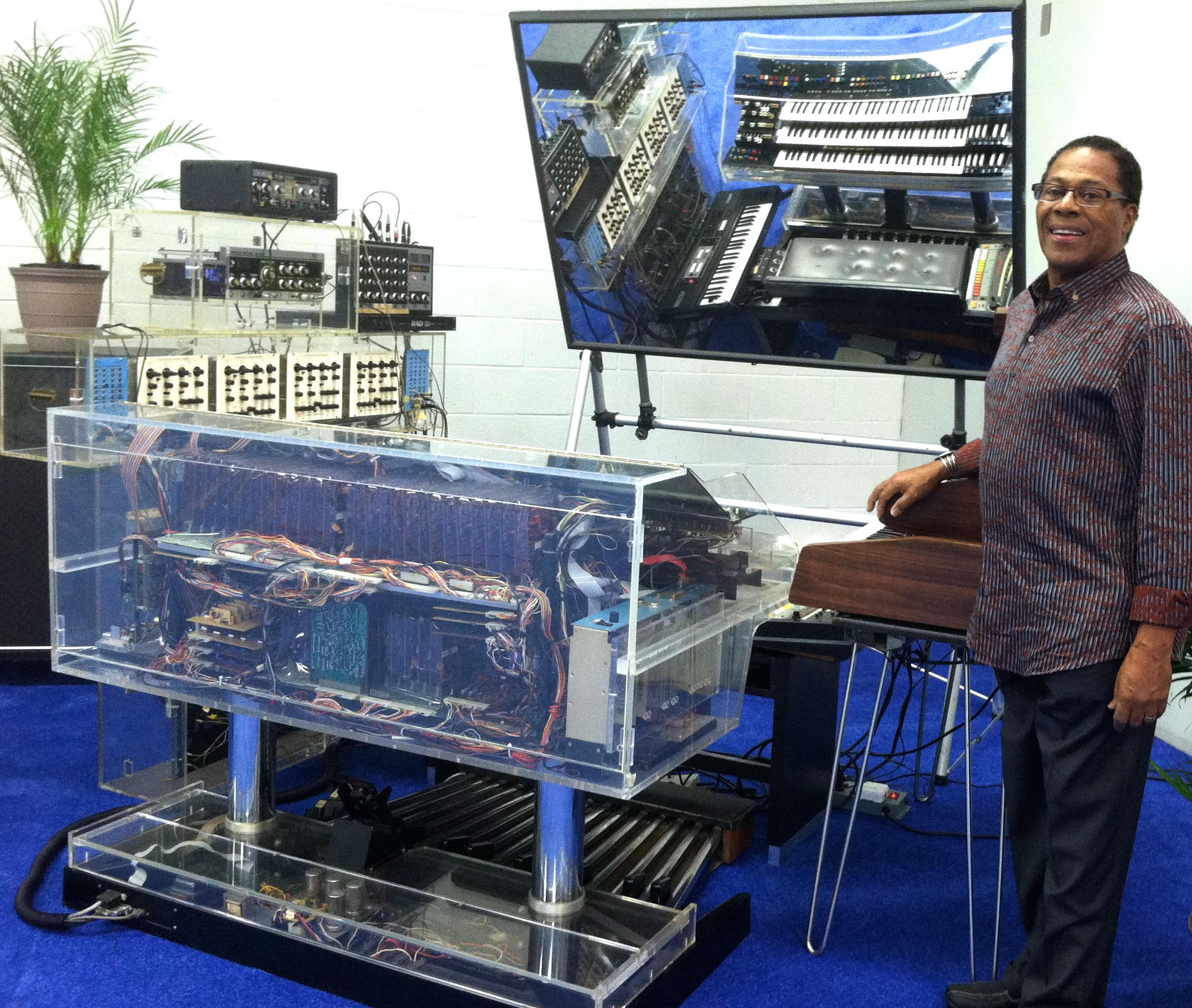
- Don Lewis standing by his Live Electronic Orchestra in 2013

Background information
- Born: March 26, 1941
- Died: November 6, 2022 (aged 81)
- Occupations: vocalist; multi-instrumentalist; electronic engineer

Don Lewis (March 26, 1941 – November 6, 2022) was an American vocalist, multi-instrumentalist, and electronic engineer. He created an instrument called the Live Electronic Orchestra (LEO), which integrated multiple instruments under a controller system and predated the MIDI controller by ten years.

== History ==
Donald Richard Lewis Jr. was born on March 26, 1941. He grew up in Dayton, Ohio, in the 1940s and 50s. Lewis has stated that his interest in music began as a child after watching an organist perform at his church.

Lewis later majored in Electronics Engineering at the former Tuskegee Institute. While there, he also sang with the Tuskegee Chorus and played music at rallies led by Dr. Martin Luther King, Jr.

In 1961, Lewis enlisted in the US Air Force as a nuclear weapons specialist and later stationed for four years in Roswell, New Mexico. After his time in the Air Force, Lewis relocated to Denver, Colorado, where he worked as an engineering technician, choir director, and nightclub musician. While there, he was commissioned to write three symphonic works by the Denver Symphony Orchestra. Lewis later resigned his job as an engineering technician in Denver to become a full-time musician.

Lewis later studied singing with legendary vocal coach Judy Davis.

== Career ==
After moving to Los Angeles, Lewis worked with several celebrity musicians and producers, including Quincy Jones, Sergio Mendez, and Michael Jackson. He also opened for the Beach Boys during their 1974 tour. Lewis performed at the 1975 and 1976 Newport Jazz Festival at Carnegie Hall.

Later he moved to San Francisco and performed there in the late 70's and early 80's. He scored for shows such as Rainbows End and You Were There for PBS, among others.

Lewis taught at UC Berkeley Extension and was a guest lecturer at Stanford University and San Jose State University. He also started two programs to encourage kids' interest in music and the arts: Young Expressions, a mentorship program for student artists around Pleasanton, California, and Say "Yes" to Music!, wherein Lewis performed at school assemblies.

== LEO and Roland TR-808 ==
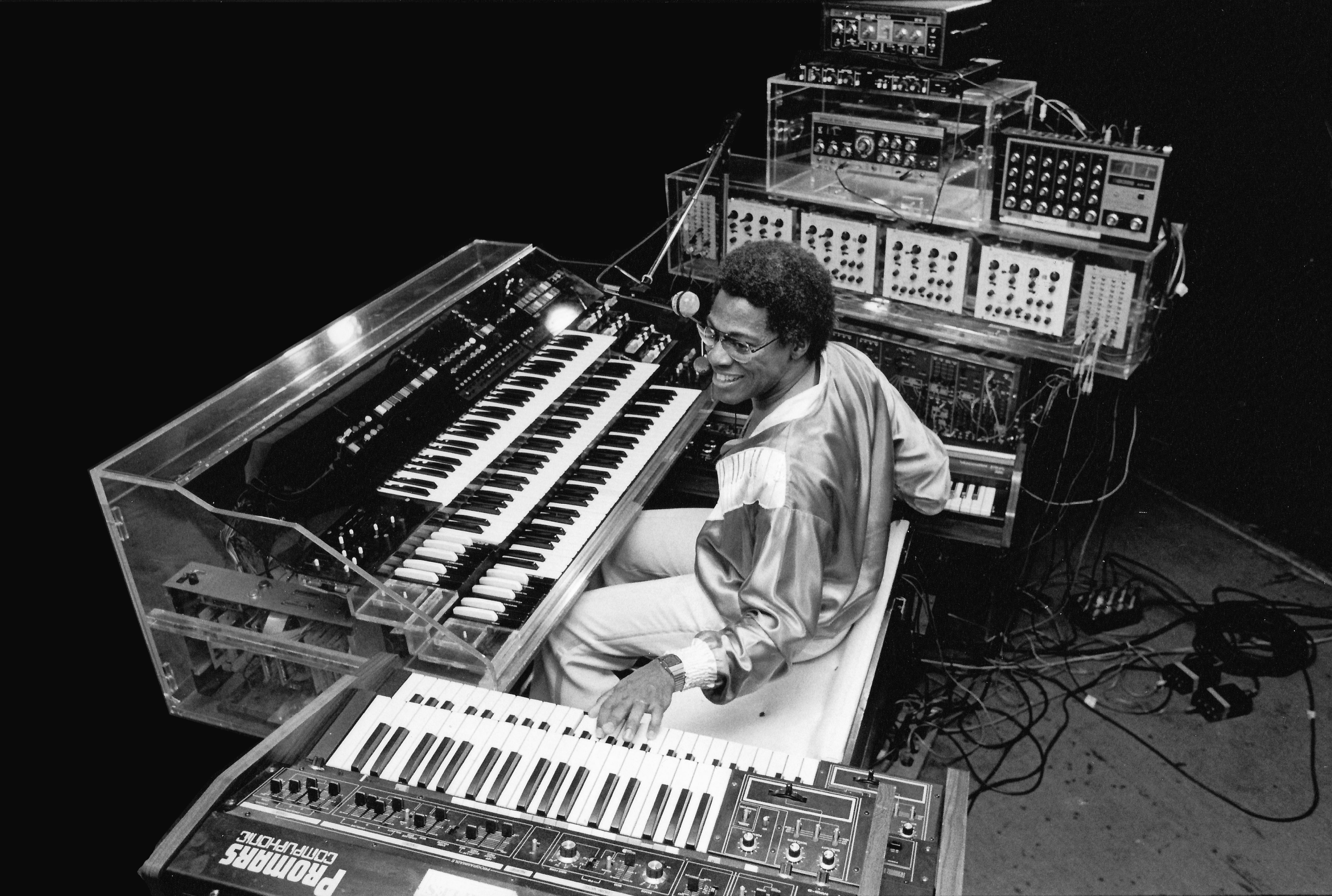
Don Lewis playing his LEO

Lewis was most famous for having created an early integrated sound controller for analog synthesizers, which he named Live Electronic Orchestra (LEO), ten years prior to MIDI. Lewis designed LEO in 1974 and completed it in 1977 by linking various synthesizers to work together in live performance, limited at the time to mostly studio production. As of 2018, LEO is housed in NAMM's Museum of Making Music located in Carlsbad, California.

The various instruments of LEO include:

- Hammond Concorde
- (4) Oberheim Expander Module (SEM)
- ARP Pro-soloist
- (2) ARP 2600
- Roland Jupiter 4
- Roland Promars
- Roland Space Echo
- Roland Digital Chorus
- Roland VP-330 vocoder
- Roland TR-808
- Hammond X-66 pedestal
- Pascetta Polyphonic Keyboard
- Roland 8 channel mixer

For over ten years, Lewis collaborated with Ikutaro Kakehashi on rhythm units including the FR-7L, CR-68, CR-78 and the Roland TR-808, a drum machine that allowed musicians to program and create their own drum beats. He also contributed to the rise in popularity of other synthesizers such as the Yamaha DX7.

In the 1980s, the American Federation of Musicians claimed that Lewis's use of technology was a threat to musicians and encouraged the protesting of his performances as a result.

== Documentary ==
A feature-length documentary film, Don Lewis and The Live Electronic Orchestra, produced and directed by Ned Augustenborg, was released in February 2023 on PBS. The film covers Lewis's life, career, relationships, and his struggles with systemic racism. It explores how Lewis, in the 1980s, was labeled as a "National Enemy" of the Musicians Union partly due to institutional fears regarding the technological advancements that Lewis embraced. In order to delve into the history of electronic music, it includes interviews with Quincy Jones, Herbie Hancock, Ikutaro Kakehashi, John Chowning and Alan Kay.

== Personal life and death ==
Lewis resided in Pleasanton, California, for 35 years. He lived with his wife, Julie. Lewis had five children. He died on November 6, 2022, at the age of 81.

== Awards ==
In 2016, Lewis won the 2016 Alameda County Arts Leadership award.

Lewis also won the 2016 Tri-Valley Heroes Arts and Culture award.
