= Bivouac (album) =

- Cover of the CD release

Studio album by Jawbreaker
- Released: December 1, 1992
- Recorded: October 1991
- Studios: Razor's Edge, San Francisco, California
- Genres: Emo; punk rock; hardcore punk
- Length: 55:02
- Labels: Tupelo, Communion
- Producers: Jawbreaker; Billy Anderson; Mike Morasky; Jonathan Burnside

Jawbreaker chronology
Unfun (1990)	Bivouac (1992)	24 Hour Revenge Therapy (1994)

Singles from Bivouac
- 1. "Chesterfield King" Released: May 1992

Bivouac is the second studio album by American punk rock band Jawbreaker, released through Tupelo Recording Company and The Communion Label on December 1, 1992. While promoting their debut album, Unfun (1990), on a ten-week tour of the United States, the band had new material that they wished to work on through their shows. They ended up breaking up after the tour's conclusion, though they later regrouped in 1991 to write new songs. From June 1991, they wrote material and practiced several times a week in the lead-up to recording sessions in October 1991. The sessions were held at Razor's Edge in San Francisco, California, with Jawbreaker, Billy Anderson, Mike Morasky, and Jonathan Burnside all getting producer credit. Categorized as an emo, punk rock, and pop-punk release, it had elements of the work of Helmet, Naked Raygun, and early Smashing Pumpkins, and took influence from the Midwestern and Washington, D.C. post-punk scenes.

Bivouac was met with favorable reviews from music critics, many of whom praised its varied sound, while others commented on the change of direction from Unfun. In the lead-up to Bivouac's release, "Chesterfield King" was released in May 1992, which was promoted with a US East Coast tour. After a few months, frontman Blake Schwarzenbach started suffering from throat issues; while touring in Europe, he underwent surgery in London to remove a polyp that had formed on his vocal cords. He returned to singing five days later and had a break in his voice, which had shifted two octaves higher. Bivouac was reissued through drummer Adam Pfahler's label, Blackball Records, in 2012 and has since been re-pressed on vinyl twice. The album has been seen as an important release for the emo genre by LA Weekly and Spin, while "Chesterfield King" has been included on a list of the 100 best pop-punk songs by Cleveland.com.

== Background ==
Jawbreaker released their debut studio album, Unfun, in May 1990 through Shredder Records, which was promoted with a ten-week tour of North America. During it, vocalist and guitarist Blake Schwarzenbach said that they had new material that they wanted to work on through their live performances. This contrasted their previous working method of recording songs as soon as they finished them. Bassist Chris Bauermeister enjoyed the touring experience but noted that it was a strain on the personal relationships between themselves. It reached a point where he was not talking to drummer Adam Pfahler and Schwarzenbach. While the tour helped establish the band on the national punk touring circuit, the tensions saw them break up upon returning home. After this, Bauermeister and Schwarzenbach returned to New York University, which was followed by several months without communication. During this period, Bauermeister attended a show at CBGB and started a conversation with an attendee. The person was disappointed that Jawbreaker had broken up, which was the first that Bauermeister had heard of this news and the first time since their tour that he had thought of the band in general. In December 1990, Bauermeister completed his bachelor's degree, with Schwarzenbach getting his some months afterwards.

After coaxing from their friends, Bauermeister and Schwarzenbach reconnected and decided to work on the band again. With education finished, the trio relocated to the Mission District of San Francisco, California, in mid-1991 to write new material. Upon moving, the music taste of the members revolved around Government Issue, Nirvana, and the Pixies. The rent in this area was low and allowed the members to immerse themselves in the location's like-minded artists and musicians. They all lived in the same building with Pfahler and Schwarzenbach in one room and Bauermeister in the room opposite with their roadie Raul Reyes and Lance Hahn of Cringer. Following this, they played 25 shows in local areas, alongside the likes of punk bands Econochrist, Green Day, and Samiam. Jawbreaker was soon adopted by the music scene in the Bay Area of San Francisco, making themselves known amongst the readers of punk zine Maximum Rocknroll, evolving into staples of punk venues in the area. Jawbreaker initially was placed halfway into bills upwards of six bands until the growth of their audience saw them play headlining gigs in Berkeley, Los Angeles, and Sacramento, California, in addition to Seattle, Washington.

== Development and recording ==
Journalist Dan Ozzi, in his book Sellout: The Major-Label Feeding Frenzy That Swept Punk, Emo, and Hardcore 1994–2007 (2021), said they stood out from the local pop-punk acts and the roster of Berkeley label Lookout Records as the members were a bit "older, a little more collegiate. They had degrees in philosophy, history, English literature, whereas many in the scene were high school students or dropouts." Ozzi also said Jawbreaker's initial time in the Bay Area coincided with the conclusion of a period of integrity for independently made rock music. He explained that upon the release of Nevermind by Nirvana in September 1991, it became an immediate commercial success. As a result, the music industry's interest in independent artists was magnified considerably. Pfahler said major labels started becoming interested in Jawbreaker that year; they received letters from two labels, who wanted to hear a demo tape from them, which the members promptly ignored. The majority of the tracks that ended up on their next album were written between June and September 1991.

Jawbreaker practiced several times a week at a rehearsal space in Tenderloin, San Francisco, leading up to recording sessions in October 1991. They recorded at Razor's Edge in San Francisco, California; they picked the studio as they were aware of other acts that had recorded there. The basic tracks of drums, bass, and guitar were recorded in a three- or four- day period. Producer Jonathan Burnside was involved in these early sessions for only a day until he left the project, leaving it mainly to producer and engineer Billy Anderson. Anderson was previously an acquaintance and a fan of the band, knowing the members from the San Francisco scene. Though Mike Morasky is credited as a producer, Anderson said he took on an engineering role. After a week's break, overdubbing commenced over two or three days. Anderson estimated that the sessions had cost the band under $5,000. They mixed the majority of the songs in the midst of the Oakland Hills fire, which they were unaware of until late in the day. "Ache" was recorded during the sessions but was ultimately left unmixed when the track listing was being finalized. The band, Anderson, Mike Morasky, and Burnside were all credited as engineers and producers. George Horn mastered the album at Fantasy Studios, located in Berkeley, California.

== Composition and lyrics ==
=== Overview ===
Musically, the sound of Bivouac has been described as emo, punk rock, and pop-punk, with elements of the work of Helmet, Naked Raygun, and early Smashing Pumpkins. In his 33 1/3 book 24 Hour Revenge Therapy (2018) on the band, Ronen Givony said it was "slower, heavier, and gloomier in every way" compared to Unfun. He explained that Bivouac was a "set of sprawling, complex, deep-sea epics; angry, paranoid howls of despair; mournful, world-weary funeral dirges; and vivid, multipart revenge fantasies". Schwarzenbach equated the album's sound to the work of Bob Mould, Mike Ness of Social Distortion, Evan Dando of the Lemonheads, Sinéad O'Connor, Guy Picciotto of Fugazi, and Dave Pirner of Soul Asylum. Kyle Ryan of The A.V. Club wrote that the band took influence from the Midwestern and Washington, D.C. post-punk scenes with the "angular rhythms, propulsive bass, noisy guitars, and a pronounced dark streak." Schwarzenbach and Hahn talked about writing songs often; Hahn and the rest of Jawbreaker hung out and listened to music together, which Schwarzenbach said found its way into their songs.

The Free Lance–Star writer Brendan Fitzgerald said it was a lyrically "dark and aggressive" album that conveys "faithlessness and despair, punctuated with plateaus of romantic rejoicing". Andy Greenwald, author of Nothing Feels Good: Punk Rock, Teenagers, and Emo (2003), wrote that the lyrics were taken from Schwarzenbach's diaries, which saw the focus shift towards him: "The attraction then was to the songwriter; it wasn't the song that the listeners related to, it was the singer". In contrast to the band's later releases, which were entirely written by Schwarzenbach, Bivouac has been described as Jawbreaker's "most collaborative" album. The lyrics to "Sleep", "P.S. New York Is Burning", and "Like a Secret" were written by Bauermeister, while "Parabola" was a collaborative effort between all three band members. Narrative samples are heard in three of the album's tracks, namely "Donatello", "Like a Secret", and "Bivouac"; Pfahler said the instrumental sections that the samples were laid over were influenced by Bitch Magnet and Sonic Youth. Author Andrew Earles wrote in his book Gimme Indie Rock: 500 Essential American Underground Rock Albums 1981–1996 (2014) that the members of Jawbreaker learned this via their contemporaries in Steel Pole Bath Tub. The album's title, Bivouac, was taken from the sample used in "Bivouac", which was from a nature documentary on ant colonies. Pfahler explained that the narrator discusses bivouacs: "temporary encampments that the ants build out of their living bodies to protect the queen. We thought it apt, as our move to S.F. felt a bit like a bivouac".

=== Tracks ===
A re-recorded version of "Shield Your Eyes" starts Bivouac, fading in after 15 seconds of droning. An earlier version of it had been included on a various-artist compilation that their previous label, Shredder Records, had released in 1989. The song describes a person choosing to stare at a sidewalk instead of looking directly at the sun to risk going blind. In the feedback-laden "Big", a wordsmith finds himself incapable of discussing his emotions. "Chesterfield King" sees the narrator contemplating loving someone; he describes an encounter with a homeless woman at a 7-Eleven. Arin Keeble, in his piece on Jawbreaker collected in The Routledge Companion to Music and Modern Literature (2022), said it delivered a short story that recalled the realistic edge of writers such as Alice Munro and Raymond Carver. Mischa Pearlman of Louder said after this exchange, he "pits the folly and freedom of youth against the experience and wisdom of age, while also confronting the human mortality head on". With "Donatello", a creative process is employed as an analogy for a doomed relationship; it is followed by the art punk track "Face Down".

"Tour Song" discusses being on the road; they had written it prior to the 1990 North American trek. It opens with an answering machine recording from Schwarzenbach addressed to his girlfriend. The song is followed by two covers: "You Don't Know..." (1980), originally recorded by Joan Jett, and "Pack It Up" (1981), originally recorded by the Pretenders. Discussing audience reactions in an interview, Schwarzenbach said "Pack It Up" acted as a reference towards people that would ask for them to play older material that they no longer played. He said "Parabola", which has a Jesus Lizard-esque bassline, was a track for "mean people". The lyrics in it were influenced by the work of Jack Kerouac and talk about self-loathing. The album concludes with the experimental track "Bivouac", which lasts for ten minutes and amalgamates the various musical elements from across the rest of the songs. AllMusic reviewer Fred Thomas described it as "dialing in the swirling basslines and big grunge choruses with beat poet-inspired lyrics aiming to reconcile Holden Caulfield-esque displacement and alienation from immediate family." Keeble wrote that the band conveys the irony of rules in the music scene, "which ostensibly exist to protect authenticity, require a performativity that can actually erode authenticity".

== Release ==
Hahn previously worked at Revolver Distribution, which worked with several labels in a warehouse in San Francisco, such as Tupelo Recording Company and The Communion Label. Hahn convinced Gary Held from Revolver to sign Jawbreaker; Hahn told the band that they should talk to Held as he liked their new material. Schwarzenbach said they ultimately went with Tupelo and Communion, as those labels previously signed one of his favorite bands, Bitch Magnet. Revolver was based in the UK, which was hoped to give the band better distribution in Europe for their upcoming releases. "Chesterfield King" was released in May 1992; it featured "Tour Song", "Face Down", "You Don't Know...", and "Pack It Up". As all of the material could not fit on a single LP, it was spun off into the EP. Pfahler said splitting the songs ultimately delayed their forthcoming album. That same month, the Eugene Register-Guard reported that Bivouac would be released in three months' time. After moving out of their residences, the band went on the ten-week Hell Is on the Way tour; booked by Pfahler, it saw them trek along the East Coast. Five days into it, Schwarzenbach blew his voice during a show in Kalamazoo, Michigan. After five songs, he left the stage, and during the following day, he visited a doctor, who found a polyp on his vocal cords. Schwarzenbach explained that it would require surgery and a two-week resting period to fully recover.

Jawbreaker held a meeting and decided that Reyes could stand in for Schwarzenbach for the remainder of the tour and potentially for the first two weeks of an upcoming European trek. After the following show, however, Reyes forgot the lyrics and Schwarzenbach started singing again. By August 1992, Schwarzenbach was becoming cautious about his voice as it had "gotten progressively worse" over the three prior shows, which he attributed to the new songs being "very vocal oriented". Around this time, the publication Spin ran a feature in its August 1992 issue, highlighting various acts from the punk scene in San Francisco, which included Green Day, Jawbreaker, and Samiam. Ahead of the European tour, they contacted Lookout Records staff member Christy Colcord, who acted as their booking agent and tour manager for the duration of it. She explained that they were unsure whether to fly out to the continent, against the orders of Schwarzenbach's doctor. Concerned about the potential loss of money from not doing it, alongside the members' enthusiasm for wanting to do it, they ultimately embarked on the tour. Three weeks into it, while in Ireland, Schwarzenbach began coughing up blood; by this point, Colcord decided to take him to a hospital. In October 1992, he underwent surgery in London to remove the polyp.

Though the doctors recommended he take a ten-day break, he started singing again after five days while in Norway. He noticed that his voice was two octaves higher, resulting in him breaking it back to what he previously sounded like. After the tour was over, Pfahler and Schwarzenbach lived in their van, as both had quit their jobs and moved their possessions into storage. Sometime later, Pfahler was forced to get arthroscopic knee surgery and was then diagnosed with thoracic outlet syndrome. Bivouac was released on December 1, 1992, through the Tupelo and Communion labels; it was intended to be released two months earlier, but as Held was busy touring Europe with DUH, this left the labels inoperable during the interim. Pfahler attributed the delay to Held holding it back in order to sell off all of the copies of the "Chesterfield" twelve-inch vinyl, in addition to the time it took to create the artwork. The cassette and LP releases of Bivouac have an album cover featuring a drawing of a topless woman with a rabbit mask. The cover of the CD release is a portion of the image showing the band name and album title; the full drawing is revealed when the insert is unfolded. The image was done by artist Brendan Murdock. Lance Hahn contributed photographs to the album's back cover, while Pfahler and Jennifer Cobb provided insert photographs. The album marked the last appearance of the band's 4F logo, which had first appeared on their debut seven-inch vinyl release. It came out around the time independent punk music was being glossed over in favor of the burgeoning grunge scene.

To coincide with the album's 20th anniversary, it and "Chesterfield King" were re-pressed on vinyl in 2012 through Pfahler's label, Blackball Records. The CD version included "Peel It the Fuck Down" and a cassette rough version of "Ache" as bonus tracks; the former lifted from the band's compilation album Etc. (2002), while a different version of the latter appeared on their following studio album, 24 Hour Revenge Therapy (1994). According to the accompanying press release, both releases were remastered by John Golden, and "the increased sampling rate boosts some of the bottom end and mid-range." Pfahler explained that he wanted a more accurate sonic portrayal of what they heard in the studio. As they were working from DATs to a digital medium, the "sampling rate now is twice what it was in 1992." Blackball Records has since re-pressed it on vinyl in 2015 and 2017.

== Reception ==
Professional ratings
Review scores
Source	Rating
AllMusic	4.5/5 stars
MusicHound Rock	4/5 stars
Pitchfork	8.8/10
Record Collector	4/5 stars
Rock Hard	7/10
Spectrum Culture	3.75/5

Several reviewers praised the album's varied sound. Givony referred to it as their "most stylistically varied and leftfield" release, full of "dense layering and experimentation of dramatic" instrumentals and vocal samples. In a review for Record Collector, Pearlman explained that the album's identity revolved around its "varied and experimental take on punk's aesthetic". Fitzgerald said that what it "lacks in production quality, it compensates for in stuttering tempo changes and fills", coming across as a "heart-wrenching example of perfect musical clarity". Adam Turner-Heffer of God Is in the TV felt that it "proved the band's ambition beyond being just a punk rock band [...] push[ing] the already rapidly expanding boundaries they had presented previously." Rock Hard writer Buffo Schnadelbach said the band eschewed the thrash metal and funk-inspired sound of other bands in San Francisco in lieu of "punk-noisy indie guitar rock". Thomas called it "easily their stormiest, gruffest material"; Melissa Fossum of Phoenix New Times said that the "super-dense" musicality made it "one of the hardest albums to get into, but it's great in the context of Jawbreaker."

Other critics commented on the songwriting and the change from Unfun. Jim Testa of Trouser Press noted that while it dropped the "playful brightness" of their debut, Bivouac continued their "formula of literate, well-crafted pop songs filled with unpredictable breaks and changes." Brandon Stosuy of Pitchfork said it was their "darkest collection, a sprawling, shaggy-dog set that found them transitioning from the cleaner, calmer Unfun to something grittier, wilder, and smarter." Author Barry M. Prickett, writing in MusicHound Rock: The Essential Album Guide (1999), was enthralled by the "longer, passionate epics that never drag" on Bivouac, as opposed to the "shorter, tighter compositions" that made up Unfun. Alternative Press writer Vivianne Oh said that the album showcases a band "progressing with tunes that crackle with alienation and burning chunks of aggressive guitar", highlighting Schwarzenbach's growth as a lyricist. Dan Fidler of Spin praised the trio's individual abilities; Ryan attributed the musicianship to all of the members being "equally invested in the songwriting". Earles said it "exuded a maturity years beyond not only its debut, but beyond many" of their peers. When he compared Bivouac to Unfun, he said it "sounds like a totally different band", calling it substantially more ambitious than its predecessor.

== Legacy and accolades ==
In the aftermath of Bivouac's release, Greenwald wrote that Schwarzenbach's charisma as a frontman "helped establish Jawbreaker as a national touring act"; in addition to this, the band, with their "dominant voice and searingly personal POV, produced emo's first idol". Earles said the album earned the band fans in the American underground from post-hardcore to Alternative rock and indie rock. Joe Gross of Spin said that Bivouac and 24 Hour Revenge Therapy were "two of early emo's key documents"; editors Cindy Dell Clark and Simon J. Bronner expressed a similar statement in Youth Cultures in America (2016). Chaz Kangas of Spectrum Culture wrote that Jawbreaker provided a specific sound in "such a way that contemporary bands still have an audible chunk of the album in their collective DNA." Ryan said that in the ensuing years, Jawbreaker subverted the darker edge of Bivouac with the brighter-sounding 24 Hour Revenge Therapy and returned to it on Dear You (1995) without the ambitious songwriting. Fitzgerald said the "sheer musical fortitude and lyrical passion [...] make this album a cornerstone of underground rock music" in the vein of the Pixies and the Promise Ring. In an Alternative Press interview promoting Dear You, Schwarzenbach criticized the album as being a "scattered multi-personality travesty". He revisited the sound of the album with his later band, Forgetters, with their track "Too Small to Fail" (2010).

Cleveland.com ranked "Chesterfield King" at number 16 on their list of the top 100 pop-punk songs. The track has similarly appeared on best-of lists for Jawbreaker songs by Alternative Press, God Is in the TV, Louder, and Stereogum. LA Weekly included Bivouac at number 9 on their list of the Top 20 Emo Albums in History. Several of the songs have been covered for different tribute albums over the years: "Bivouac" by the Goodboy Suit for So Much for Letting Go: A Tribute to Jawbreaker Vol. 1 (2003); and "Shield Your Eyes" by For Amusement Only and "Chesterfield King" by Nerf Herder for Bad Scene, Everyone's Fault: Jawbreaker Tribute (2003). Gordon Withers covered "Chesterfield King" and "Bivouac" for his album Jawbreaker on Cello (2019), which came about from his involvement in the Jawbreaker documentary Don't Break Down (2017).

== Track listing ==
All songs written by Jawbreaker, except where noted. The following is the CD listing; the vinyl version omits "Tour Song", "Face Down", "You Don't Know...", and "Pack It Up".

CD edition track listing
No.	Title	Writer(s)	Length
1.	"Shield Your Eyes"		3:10
2.	"Big"		5:06
3.	"Chesterfield King"		3:55
4.	"Sleep"		4:06
5.	"Donatello"		3:03
6.	"Face Down"		3:06
7.	"P.S. New York Is Burning"		5:08
8.	"Like a Secret"		4:11
9.	"Tour Song"		4:39
10.	"You Don't Know..." (Joan Jett cover)	Jett; Kenny Laguna; Ritchie Cordell	2:35
11.	"Pack It Up" (The Pretenders cover)	Chrissie Hynde; James Honeyman-Scott	2:51
12.	"Parabola"		3:06
13.	"Bivouac"		10:06

== Personnel ==
Personnel per sleeve.

Jawbreaker

- Blake Schwarzenbach – guitar, vocals
- Chris Bauermeister – bass
- Adam Pfahler – drums

Production and design

- Jawbreaker – producer, engineer
- Billy Anderson – producer, engineer
- Mike Morasky – producer, engineer
- Jonathan Burnside – producer, engineer
- George Horn – mastering
- Brendan Murdock – paintings
- Lance Hahn – back photos
- Jennifer Cobb – insert photos
- Adam Pfahler – insert photos
- John Yates – "dirty work"
