= Etc. (album) =

Compilation album by Jawbreaker
- Released: July 23, 2002
- Genre: Punk rock
- Length: 67:29
- Label: Blackball

Jawbreaker chronology
Live 4/30/96 (1999)	Etc. (2002)

Professional ratings
Review scores
Source	Rating
AllMusic	4/5 stars
Pitchfork	4.2/10

Etc. is a collection of B-sides and rarities by American punk rock band Jawbreaker.

== Track listing ==
No.	Title	Original Appearance	Length
1.	"Shield Your Eyes"		3:41
2.	"Equalized"	B side of the Busy 7 inch single (1989)	3:19
3.	"Caroline"		2:42
4.	"Better Half"	7 inch split single with Crimpshrine - Better Half/Sanctuary on Reckless Records (1993)	4:57
5.	"Split"	7 inch split single with Samiam (1991)	4:21
6.	"Gutless"		3:07
7.	"With or Without U2 (A medley consisting of covers of songs by U2, Misfits and The Vapors)"	7 inch split single with Jawbox - Air Waves Dream / With Or Without U-2 on Selfless Records (1991)	2:41
8.	"Fantastic Planet"		5:09
9.	"Rich"		2:54
10.	"Peel It the Fuck Down"		4:03
11.	"Pretty Persuasion (R.E.M. cover)"		5:32
12.	"Kiss the Bottle"	"17 Reasons: The Mission District compilation" from Mission Merchants (1992)	4:35
13.	"First Step"	Recorded during the 24 Hour Revenge Therapy sessions (1994)	3:25
14.	"Friends Back East"	Recorded during the 24 Hour Revenge Therapy sessions (1994)	2:13
15.	"Sea Foam Green"	"Punk USA: The Compilation Soundtrack to Your Breakdown" on Lookout Records (1994)	4:07
16.	"Housesitter"		3:42
17.	"Into You Like a Train (The Psychedelic Furs cover)"	B side to the Fireman single, would later appear on the 2004 re-issue of Dear You (1995)	2:26
18.	"Sister"	Recorded during the Dear You sessions, would later appear in the 2004 re-issue (1995)	4:12
19.	"Friendly Fire"	Recorded during the Dear You sessions, would later appear in the 2004 re-issue (1995)	4:59
20.	"Boxcar"	Rerecorded version of a track originally from 24 Hour Revenge Therapy (1994) done during the Dear You sessions. Would later appear in the 2004 re-issue (1995)	1:53
