= Bad Scene, Everyone's Fault: Jawbreaker Tribute =

Compilation album by Dying Wish Records
- Released: July 29, 2003
- Genre: Alternative rock, indie rock, pop punk
- Length: 63:49
- Label: Dying Wish Records

Bad Scene, Everyone's Fault is a tribute album to the band Jawbreaker, released in 2003 by Dying Wish Records. It includes bands of the post-hardcore, punk rock, pop punk, and emo genres covering Jawbreaker songs. The album is named after a song on Jawbreaker's 1995 album Dear You.

== Reception ==
Scott Heisel of Punknews.org rated the album three and a half stars out of five, calling it "rather solid from start to finish, [seeming] like a heartfelt tribute to the Bay Area punk trio, as opposed to an easy cash-in disc." Describing Bigwig and Face to Face's tracks as "virtually note-for-note renditions of the originals", he complimented them for the clarity of their vocals, something lacking in the original Jawbreaker recordings. He praised Duvall's cover of "Busy" as "one of the most beautiful cover songs [by anyone, of anyone] that I've ever heard", and cited The Æffect's version of "Boxcar" as his favorite track:

If you've ever wanted to hear Jawbreaker at your local dance club, give them this song and it will get spun until the cows come home. Hearing singer Aaron croon, "You're not punk, and I'm telling everyone / save your breath, I never was one" really embodies the Æffect's outlook on music, and the song has rarely sounded sweeter.

He was more critical of some of the other tracks, calling Sparta's acoustic rendition of "Kiss the Bottle" "a bit too foreign and sterile" and noting that "The Reunion Show's MOOG-a-riffic sound fails them on 'Unlisted Track', sounding more chaotic than poppy."

== Track listing ==
All tracks are written by Blake Schwarzenbach, Chris Bauermeister, and Adam Pfahler, except where noted

No.	Title	Artist	Length
1.	"Ashtray Monument" (Schwarzenbach)	Bigwig	2:55
2.	"Chemistry"	Bayside	3:42
3.	"The Boat Dreams from the Hill" (Schwarzenbach)	Face to Face	2:42
4.	"Want"	Name Taken	3:06
5.	"Busy"	Duvall	6:30
6.	"Bad Scene, Everyone's Fault"	Travoltas	2:14
7.	"Jinx Removing" (Schwarzenbach)	Riddlin' Kids	3:02
8.	"Million"	Counterfit	4:32
9.	"Boxcar" (Schwarzenbach)	The Æffect	3:00
10.	"Shield Your Eyes"	For Amusement Only	3:14
11.	"Save Your Generation"	Fall Out Boy	3:36
12.	"Unlisted Track"	The Reunion Show	2:21
13.	"Kiss the Bottle"	Sparta	4:52
14.	"Chesterfield King"	Nerf Herder	3:30
15.	"Do You Still Hate Me?" (Schwarzenbach)	Kill Your Idols	2:43
16.	"I Love You So Much It's Killing Us Both"	The Gamits	2:55
17.	"Jet Black"	Good Night Bad Guy	5:49
18.	"Better Half"	Jeff Ott	3:06
Total length:			63:49

== Personnel ==
- Sergio Sandino – artwork
- Jake Wallace – art direction and design
- Alan Douches – mastering
- Dave DeCeglie – producer and engineering
