= Bay Area punk =

Regional punk rock scene from the San Francisco Bay Area

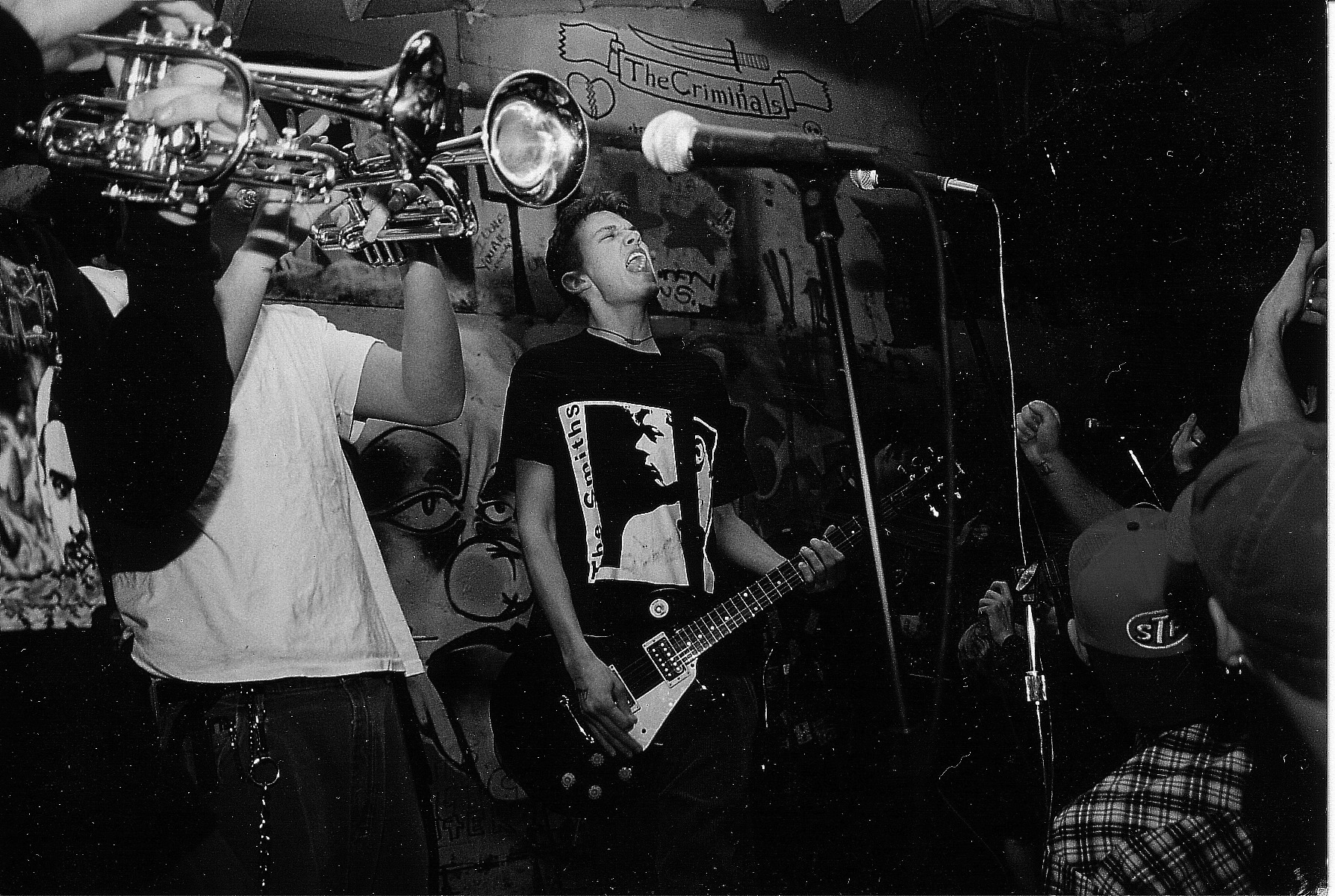
Link 80 headlining 924 Gilman in 1997

Bay Area punk is a broad term for the punk rock scene centered on the San Francisco Bay Area in Northern California, encompassing San Francisco, Berkeley, Oakland, and surrounding cities.

The scene emerged in 1976–77 with a first wave of bands at San Francisco's Mabuhay Gardens and developed through a second wave centered on Berkeley's 924 Gilman Street in the late 1980s, the latter producing Green Day, Operation Ivy, and Rancid, whose commercial breakthroughs in the 1990s brought the Bay Area sound to a global audience.

Alongside its musical output, the scene produced some of punk's most influential institutions: the magazine Maximum RockNRoll, the label Alternative Tentacles, and the Lookout! Records label empire.

== Origins: San Francisco's first wave (1976–1980) ==
San Francisco's punk scene emerged in 1976–77, influenced by the punk movements in New York and the United Kingdom and the city's own tradition of radical politics and experimental art. The SF Public Library's San Francisco Punk Collection notes that the scene also reflected the city's social unrest, experimental art scenes, and the influence of groups like the Ramones and the Flamin' Groovies.

The earliest Bay Area punk band of note was Crime, a San Francisco duo formed in 1976 by "Frankie Fix" (Frank Agnew) and "Johnny Strike" (Paul Roessler) who billed themselves as "San Francisco's First Rock & Roll Band" and distributed their own records independently before the DIY model had a name. The Avengers, formed in 1977 by vocalist Penelope Houston, were among the first wave and opened for the Sex Pistols at their final concert ever, held at San Francisco's Winterland Ballroom on January 14, 1978. The Pistols' dissolution in the days after that show left the Bay Area scene to define itself without British scaffolding.

The hub of this first wave was Mabuhay Gardens (known as the "Fab Mab"), a Filipino restaurant and nightclub at 443 Broadway in North Beach, San Francisco. Originally booked by promoter Dirk Dirksen, the so-called "Pope of Punk," the Mabuhay became the city's central punk venue from 1977 until its closure in 1987, hosting Crime, The Avengers, The Nuns, Flipper, and Dead Kennedys, among many others, and serving as a key touring stop for bands from New York and London.

Dead Kennedys formed in San Francisco in June 1978 when East Bay Ray placed an advertisement in the newspaper The Recycler, looking for bandmates. Their first show, at the Mabuhay on July 19, 1978, had them opening for Negative Trend, The Offs, and DV8. Under vocalist Jello Biafra, Dead Kennedys became the scene's most politically charged band, releasing "California Über Alles" in 1979 and the debut album Fresh Fruit for Rotting Vegetables in 1980. Biafra ran for mayor of San Francisco in 1979, finishing fourth in a field of ten candidates. That same year he founded Alternative Tentacles Records, which became one of punk's most significant independent labels. The band's political work extended beyond music: at the 1980 Bay Area Music Awards, they performed an unreleased song mocking the mainstream industry, with the band wearing white shirts with black dollar signs.

Flipper, formed in San Francisco in 1979 from members of Negative Trend and Ricky Williams, became an influential force in the development of noise rock and proto-sludge metal with their slow, abrasive sound and nihilistic humor; their album Album – Generic Flipper (1982) has been cited as an influence on Nirvana and the Seattle grunge scene.

V. Vale launched the zine Search & Destroy in 1977, documenting the SF punk scene before founding RE/Search Publications. Journalist and activist Tim Yohannan hosted a punk radio show on KPFA from 1977, laying the groundwork for what would become Maximum RockNRoll magazine.

The San Francisco scene was distinguished from Los Angeles punk by its explicit political engagement. Crime drummer Henry S. Rosenthal described LA punk as "very different from here—the bands that came out of LA we perceived as being more commercial, poppy, less politically engaged." Punks organized around progressive causes: a 1978 "Nix on Six: Save the Homos" benefit at the Mabuhay Gardens, opposing California's anti-gay Proposition 6, was emceed by Supervisor Harvey Milk.

== Hardcore and zine culture (1980–1986) ==
As the first wave of Bay Area punk gave way to hardcore punk in the early 1980s, the scene's tempo, politics, and audience shifted. Dead Kennedys anticipated the change with the EP In God We Trust, Inc. (1981) and the album Plastic Surgery Disasters (1982), both of which abandoned the surf and rockabilly elements of Fresh Fruit for Rotting Vegetables in favor of faster tempos and pointed attacks on the Reagan administration and the Moral Majority. The shift was driven by a younger and more suburban audience drawn from across the Bay Area, and by a national hardcore network in which Northern California began to figure as a distinct regional scene alongside Los Angeles, Washington, D.C., Boston, and New York.

The local roster of the era was distinguished by explicitly anarchist and anti-war politics. San Francisco's Crucifix, formed in 1980, brought a British-influenced anarcho-punk style and toured the United Kingdom with bands including Conflict and the Subhumans before disbanding in 1986. Berkeley's Fang became a fixture of the East Bay scene and a regular at Ruthie's Inn. Other significant local bands included Whipping Boy, Bl'ast! (from nearby Santa Cruz), the Faction (San Jose, featuring skateboarder Steve Caballero on bass), and Ribzy.

The Bay Area scene was also defined by an unusual influx of bands relocating from Texas. MDC moved from Austin to San Francisco in the early 1980s and became emblematic of the city's anarcho-punk politics. Dirty Rotten Imbeciles (D.R.I.) relocated from Houston in 1983, living in their van and eating at soup kitchens between gigs before joining the nationwide Rock Against Reagan tour with Dead Kennedys and MDC. Verbal Abuse and the Dicks followed shortly after. The Texas migration supplied much of the talent for the mid-decade crossover between hardcore and Bay Area thrash metal: D.R.I.'s 1987 album Crossover gave the resulting subgenre its name, while Bay Area bands such as Attitude Adjustment, Verbal Abuse, and Fang straddled both scenes.

The hardcore era's central venues were the Mabuhay Gardens, which continued to host punk shows until its closure in 1987; the adjacent Rock On Broadway, a second-floor club at 435 Broadway that booked hardcore and thrash bills from 1984 to 1985; Tool & Die and the Sound of Music in San Francisco; and, in the East Bay, Ruthie's Inn, a club on San Pablo Avenue in Berkeley operated by African-American blues promoter Wes Robinson. National Geographic has described Ruthie's as the site of "a punk-metal crossover" in the mid-1980s, hosting Bad Brains, Dead Kennedys, MDC, D.O.A., Verbal Abuse, and Fang alongside thrash acts including Metallica, Slayer, and Exodus.

The era's documentary anchor was Not So Quiet on the Western Front, a 47-band double LP compiled by Tim Yohannan and released by Alternative Tentacles in 1982. The package included issue zero of Maximum RockNRoll as a printed insert, marking the magazine's first appearance and establishing the Bay Area as a hub of international hardcore for the remainder of the decade. By the mid-1980s, however, the San Francisco hardcore scene had, in the words of the documentary Turn It Around: The Story of East Bay Punk, become "wrought with violence, corruption and racism," prompting a younger generation of Bay Area punks to look across the bay to Berkeley for an alternative venue model. Oakland's Neurosis, formed in 1985, emerged from the late hardcore scene before evolving into post-metal and sludge metal. The search for a new venue culminated at the end of 1986 in the opening of 924 Gilman Street, marking the close of the hardcore era and the beginning of what is sometimes called the second wave of Bay Area punk.

Maximum RockNRoll, launched by Tim Yohannan in 1982 as a print magazine based in San Francisco, became the international bible of underground punk. Published monthly and distributed globally, it covered scenes ignored by mainstream music press and maintained a strictly non-commercial editorial policy, refusing advertising from major labels. Its influence on the culture of DIY punk--from record reviews to letters columns to scene reports from across the world--extended far beyond the Bay Area. The magazine shared a printer with the original Black Panther Party newspaper and the punk zine Maximum Rock N Roll (their immediate predecessor).

Jello Biafra ran Alternative Tentacles from San Francisco throughout this period, releasing records by Dead Kennedys and a roster of international punk and hardcore acts. In 1986 the label was targeted in an obscenity prosecution over the poster included with Dead Kennedys' Frankenchrist album, leading to a trial that ended in a hung jury; the case became a landmark in debates over censorship in rock music.

== 924 Gilman and the East Bay scene (1986–1993) ==
The San Francisco scene became, in the words of the Turn It Around documentary, "wrought with violence, corruption and racism." Punks in the East Bay built a more inclusive alternative around a warehouse in West Berkeley. Tim Yohannan joined forces with local organizers including Kamala Parks and Victor Hayden to found the Gilman Street Project, signing a lease for 924 Gilman Street in April 1986 and hosting the first show on December 31, 1986.

The club operated under a strict set of rules: no alcohol, no drugs, no violence, no racism, no sexism, no homophobia. These rules distinguished it from conventional punk venues and created what National Geographic called "the only venue of its kind left in California--a place with no owner, where takings are split evenly between bands." All shows were all-ages, admission was minimal, and the venue was run entirely by volunteers. Operation Ivy, formed in Berkeley in 1987 by vocalist Jesse Michaels and guitarist-vocalist Tim Armstrong, became the most influential band to emerge from the early Gilman scene. Their fusion of ska and hardcore punk on Energy (1989) is credited by musicologist Aaron Carnes as going "way beyond having punk elements... it was unleashed, unapologetic punk-rock fury." The band played 185 shows and recorded 32 songs before disbanding in May 1989; their final show was fittingly at 924 Gilman. Operation Ivy was offered a major-label deal and turned it down.

The same night as Operation Ivy's last show was the first public performance of Green Day, who had formed in 1987 when Billie Joe Armstrong (from Oakland) and Mike Dirnt, both students at Pinole Valley High School, founded the band as Sweet Children before adopting the name Green Day. Rancid coalesced in 1991 when Operation Ivy alumni Tim Armstrong and Matt Freeman joined drummer Brett Reed; the band became Gilman regulars and future standard-bearers of Bay Area punk.

Lookout! Records, founded by Larry Livermore and David Hayes in the East Bay, became the commercial engine of the Gilman scene, signing Green Day, The Lookouts, Crimpshrine, MTX, and others. Lookout!'s distribution model--pressing records in the East Bay and selling them nationwide through independent channels--made it one of the most successful independent punk labels in the country before Green Day's departure to a major label. Jawbreaker, formed at NYU in 1986 and soon based in San Francisco's Mission District, became one of the Gilman circuit's most acclaimed bands, releasing three albums--Bivouac (1992), 24 Hour Revenge Therapy (1994), and Dear You (1995)--that influenced emo and alternative rock far beyond the punk underground. Other significant bands of the Gilman era include NOFX, led by San Francisco native Fat Mike (Michael Burkett), who recorded the influential Ribbed (1991) and White Trash, Two Heebs and a Bean (1992); Screeching Weasel (Chicago-based but a Lookout!/Gilman regular); and the feminist punk act Tribe 8.

== Mainstream breakthrough and aftermath (1993–2000) ==
Green Day's third album, Dookie (Reprise/Warner Bros., February 1, 1994), marked the Bay Area scene's arrival in the mainstream. Produced by Rob Cavallo, it reached No. 2 on the Billboard 200, sold over 10 million copies in the United States alone, and generated the singles "Longview," "Basket Case," and "When I Come Around." In winning the Grammy Award for Best Alternative Music Album in 1995 and selling 20 million copies worldwide, Dookie became one of the best-selling punk albums of all time and triggered a wave of major-label signings of Bay Area and East Bay punk bands.

Green Day's signing to Reprise Records led to their being barred from 924 Gilman, whose membership voted to enforce the club's longstanding "no major-label bands" policy. The band was not permitted to return until May 17, 2015--22 years later--for a benefit show for AK Press and 1984 Printing after a fatal fire in West Oakland. Armstrong told the crowd: "I really think of this place as a very important place, to me, and it's in my heart forever." Rancid similarly declined a major-label deal in 1994 (reportedly from Epitaph Records and Madonna's Maverick Records) and released ...And Out Come the Wolves on Epitaph in 1995, which reached No. 45 on the Billboard 200 and produced the hits "Ruby Soho" and "Time Bomb." AFI, formed in Ukiah, California, in 1991, began releasing records on Nitro Records and became one of the most commercially successful bands to emerge from the Gilman circuit in the 2000s.

== Key characteristics ==
=== Political ethos ===
Bay Area punk has been distinguished throughout its history by explicit left-wing political engagement, an inheritance of San Francisco's countercultural tradition, the Free Speech Movement at UC Berkeley, and the legacy of the Black Panther Party in Oakland. From Dead Kennedys' satirical attacks on Reaganism and corporate culture to The Coup's Marxist politics, the scene produced politically engaged music at a level often contrasted with the more apolitical commercialism of Los Angeles punk. The Gilman scene reinforced this tradition through its rules against racism, sexism, and homophobia, and through the influence of Maximum RockNRoll, which maintained a strictly non-commercial editorial stance and a global focus on underground punk politics.

=== DIY infrastructure ===
The Bay Area punk scene built DIY infrastructure: independent labels (Alternative Tentacles, Lookout!, Bomb, Subterranean), nationally distributed zines (Maximum RockNRoll, Search & Destroy, Cometbus), all-ages collective venues (924 Gilman), and volunteer-run promotional networks. This self-sufficiency allowed the scene to outlast the commercial cycles of mainstream punk and continues to operate at 924 Gilman, which as of 2025 hosts more than twenty concerts per month.

=== Inclusivity and queerness ===
The scene has been documented as "super queer... from the '80s and the '90s and up until today," with the founding of Outpunk zine, the feminist punk collective Sister Spit, and Tribe 8 among its most significant contributions to queer punk history. The Gilman rules against homophobia explicitly codified the scene's inclusive politics from its founding.

== Key labels ==
- Alternative Tentacles (San Francisco, founded 1979 by Jello Biafra): Dead Kennedys, MDC, Butthole Surfers NoMeansNo
- Lookout! Records (Berkeley, founded 1987 by Larry Livermore): Green Day, Operation Ivy, The Lookouts, Screeching Weasel, Crimpshrine, MTX, Avail
- Subterranean Records (San Francisco): Flipper, Dead Kennedys, Crime, MDC
- Bomb Hip-Hop Records (San Francisco): primarily hip-hop but bridged punk and rap communities
- Fat Wreck Chords (San Francisco, founded 1991 by Fat Mike of NOFX): NOFX, Lagwagon, Propagandhi, No Use for a Name, Strung Out
- Epitaph Records (Los Angeles, but distributed many Bay Area acts): Rancid, AFI, Alkaline Trio

== Key venues ==
- Mabuhay Gardens ("The Fab Mab"), 443 Broadway, San Francisco — central venue 1977–1987; reopened 2025
- Winterland Ballroom, San Francisco — hosted the Sex Pistols' final concert, January 14, 1978
- 924 Gilman Street, Berkeley — founded December 1986; still operating
- New Method Warehouse, Oakland — early punk venue and squat in the late 1970s and early 1980s
- Tool & Die, San Francisco — 1980s hardcore venue
- Sound of Music, San Francisco — 1980s punk venue
- On Broadway, San Francisco — above the Mabuhay; hosted punk and new wave shows
- Ruthie's Inn, Berkeley — East Bay hardcore venue of the early 1980s

== Notable publications and media ==
- Maximum RockNRoll (San Francisco, founded 1982 by Tim Yohannan): monthly magazine; global bible of DIY punk
- Search & Destroy (San Francisco, 1977–1979, V. Vale): foundational SF punk documentation; predecessor to RE/Search Publications
- Cometbus (Berkeley, founded 1981 by Aaron Cometbus): long-running personal zine closely associated with the Gilman scene
- Turn It Around: The Story of East Bay Punk (2017, dir. Corbett Redford): feature documentary produced by Green Day, narrated by Iggy Pop, covering over 30 years of Bay Area punk history

== See also ==
- Bay Area hip-hop
