= Bay Area hip-hop =

American regional hip-hop scene

- Stylistic origins: East Coast hip-hop; old-school hip-hop; gangsta rap; funk; jazz fusion; soul; psychedelic funk
- Cultural origins: Early-mid 80's, Oakland, San Francisco, Vallejo, Richmond, Daly City.

Subgenres
- Mobb; Hyphy

Other topics
- West Coast hip hop; Miami bass; Southern hip hop; Alternative hip-hop; Master P

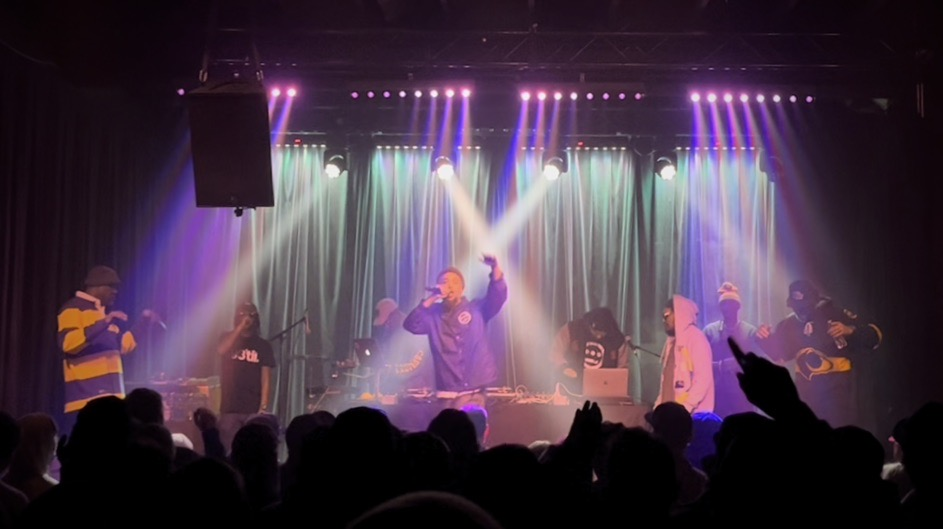
Hieroglyphics perform at the Domino Room in 2025.

Bay Area hip-hop refers to the regional hip-hop scene centered on the San Francisco Bay Area in Northern California. The scene took shape in the late 1970s and early 1980s, and is distinguished by an unusually strong tradition of do-it-yourself entrepreneurship (mixtape distribution, independent labels), heavy low-end "slap" production, regional slang, and a sequence of homegrown sub-styles, such as pimp rap, mobb music, turntablism, conscious rap, and hyphy, that have repeatedly influenced mainstream hip-hop.

== Predecessors ==
Northern California supplied several foundational elements of hip-hop culture. In the late 1960s, Oakland was the birthplace of "boogaloo" and "robotting" street-dance styles which led to pop-lock style dances. When the Electric Boogaloos appeared on Soul Train in 1979, host Don Cornelius mistakenly credited Los Angeles rather than Oakland. KQED's That's My Word series further identifies Sly Stone's hybrid of church, street, and electronic drums, the Black Panther Party (founded in Oakland in 1966), the Black Arts Movement, and Sun Ra's Space Is the Place (filmed in Oakland, 1974) as cultural precursors to Bay Area hip hop and rap.

From the late 1970s through the mid-1990s, Filipino American mobile DJ crews, including Ultimate Creations, Spintronix, and Images, Inc., staged parties and "showcase" events throughout the Bay Area, particularly in Daly City, San Francisco, Vallejo, Union City and Fremont. Sociologist Oliver Wang documents this scene in Legions of Boom: Filipino American Mobile DJ Crews in the San Francisco Bay Area (Duke University Press, 2015), arguing that the crews were the direct predecessor to the region's globally influential turntablist scene and trained DJs including DJ Q-Bert, Shortkut, and Mix Master Mike.

== Early history (1980s) ==
In the 1980s, Bay Area hip-hop circulated primarily through homemade cassette tapes. Richmond rapper Magic Mike reported that copies of his tapes circulated as far as Germany. CJ Flash recalled that "it was more or less trying to make a name for yourself... you had to make a tape."

Oakland's Too $hort (Todd Anthony Shaw) began producing and hand-selling explicit rap cassettes with friend Freddy B. in the early 1980s. He released three independent albums through 75 Girls Records from 1983 to 1988, co-founded Dangerous Music with Freddy B. in 1986–87, and released Born to Mack in 1987, which sold an estimated 50,000 copies from his car trunk before Jive Records re-issued it in 1988. His fifth album Life Is... Too Short (1989) was certified double platinum by the RIAA.

Oakland's MC Hammer (Stanley Kirk Burrell) launched Bust It Records with a $20,000 loan from Oakland A's players Dwayne Murphy and Mike Davis. Hammer released the independent Feel My Power in 1986, then signed to Capitol Records. With Please Hammer Don't Hurt 'Em (1990) he became the first solo rapper to top the Billboard 200 and the first to reach diamond certification. Digital Underground, founded in Oakland in 1987 by Gregory "Shock G" Jacobs, Jimi "Chopmaster J" Dright, and DJ Kenneth "Kenny-K" Waters, signed to Tommy Boy Records and broke out with "Doowutchyalike" (1989) and Sex Packets (1990); its single "The Humpty Dance" reached No. 11 on the Billboard Hot 100 and No. 1 on the Hot Rap Singles chart. Tupac Shakur, who had moved to Marin City in 1988 and attended Tamalpais High School, joined Digital Underground in 1990 as a roadie and backup dancer, debuting on "Same Song" from the group's This Is an EP Release (January 1991) before launching his own career.

Richmond's 415, formed in 1988 and composed of Richie Rich, D-Loc, and producers DJ Daryl and J.E.D., took their name from the Bay Area's telephone area code and established one of the earliest templates for Bay gangsta rap on 41Fivin (1990) and Nu Niggaz on Tha Blokkk (1991). In Vallejo, E-40 (Earl Stevens) formed The Click with his cousin B-Legit, brother D-Shot, and sister Suga-T, released the EP Let's Side on his new Sick Wid It Records label in 1990, and dropped his solo debut Federal in 1992–93. Also from Vallejo, Mac Dre (Andre Hicks) issued his debut Young Black Brotha EP in 1989.

== Golden era (1990s) ==
=== Mobb music ===
By the mid-1990s the cassette-tape sound had evolved into mobb music, a Bay Area counterpart to G-funk defined by slow tempos, deep Roland TR-808 bass, sparse synth leads, and live-instrument overdubs. Key producers include Vallejo's Khayree, Mike Mosley, Sam Bostic (together as Mob Boss Productions), Studio Ton, Ant Banks, E-A-Ski, and Rick Rock. Mike Mosley told HipHopDX that he and Bostic "started the whole Mobb music thing — a slow, 808, sub-sonic, groovy, melodic sound," and that E-40 and Celly Cel "coined our style of music 'Mobb music.'" Mobb-era artists include Spice 1 (Robert Green, East Oakland), whose 187 He Wrote (1993) made him one of the first West Coast rappers signed to Jive alongside Too $hort and E-40; Sacramento's Brotha Lynch Hung, whose Season of da Siccness (1995) helped pioneer horrorcore; Mac Mall (Illegal Business?, 1993); RBL Posse from San Francisco's Hunters Point; Vallejo's Celly Cel; JT the Bigga Figga ("Game Recognize Game"); The Luniz ("I Got 5 on It"); and Oakland's female duo Conscious Daughters. E-40's In a Major Way (1995) is widely cited as the defining Bay Area album of the era, peaking at No. 13 on the Billboard 200 and No. 2 on the Top R&B/Hip-Hop Albums chart before earning RIAA platinum certification.

=== Underground and conscious rap ===
Oakland's Hieroglyphics collective--Del the Funky Homosapien, Souls of Mischief (A-Plus, Opio, Phesto, Tajai), Casual, Pep Love, and producer/manager Domino--built their following from Del's 1991 Elektra debut I Wish My Brother George Was Here and Souls of Mischief's Jive debut 93 'til Infinity (1993). After being dropped by major labels, they founded Hieroglyphics Imperium Recordings in 1995, built one of rap's first artist-owned websites, and released the group album 3rd Eye Vision in 1998.

The Solesides / Quannum Projects collective--DJ Shadow, Blackalicious (Gift of Gab and Chief Xcel), Lateef the Truthspeaker, Lyrics Born (together as Latyrx), and journalist Jeff Chang--coalesced around UC Davis's KDVS radio station in 1991-92.

DJ Shadow's Endtroducing..... (1996) helped crystallize instrumental hip-hop globally; Blackalicious's Nia (1999) and Blazing Arrow (2002) became touchstones of Bay Area underground rap.

The Coup, led by Oakland rapper-activist Boots Riley (with E-Roc and later DJ Pam the Funkstress), debuted in 1993 with Kill My Landlord (Wild Pitch/EMI) and produced acclaimed albums including Steal This Album (1998) and Party Music (2001)--the latter notable for cover art, completed in June 2001, depicting the World Trade Center towers being destroyed by a remote-control bomb. Riley later directed the film Sorry to Bother You (2018). San Francisco's Paris (Oscar Jackson Jr.) founded Scarface Records in 1989 and released the Black Panther Party-influenced The Devil Made Me Do It (Tommy Boy, 1990); Warner Bros. later dropped him over the George H.W. Bush revenge-fantasy track "Bush Killa," and he self-released the follow-up Sleeping with the Enemy in 1992.

=== Turntablism ===
Out of the Filipino mobile-DJ tradition came the Invisibl Skratch Piklz (founded 1989 as Shadow of the Prophet), whose core members DJ Q-Bert, Mix Master Mike, DJ Apollo, Shortkut, and D-Styles became the first all-DJ ensemble to treat turntables as instruments; Q-Bert is credited with coining the term "turntablist." The DMC Championship organisers eventually asked the group to stop competing because they were discouraging other entrants. Mix Master Mike later joined the Beastie Boys on Hello Nasty (1998). The San Francisco label Bomb Hip-Hop Records' Return of the DJ compilation series (mid-1990s) helped codify turntablism as a recognized style.

=== Independent labels and distribution ===
The Bay Area's dense network of independent labels was central to its identity. Major imprints of the era included Dangerous Music and later Up All Nite Records (Too $hort); Sick Wid It Records (E-40); Thizz Entertainment / Romp Records (Mac Dre, founded 1996); Scarface / Guerrilla Funk (Paris); Hieroglyphics Imperium; Solesides / Quannum Projects; Bust It Records (MC Hammer); and Bomb Hip-Hop Records. A Billboard journalist estimated in 1994 that Bay Area rappers were releasing 15 to 30 new records per week. Master P built No Limit Records from a record store in Richmond, modeled in part on Bay Area trunk-distribution practices, before relocating to New Orleans.

== Hyphy (2000–2010) ==
=== Definition and origins ===
"Hyphy" (/ˈhaɪfi/) is Oakland slang short for "hyperactive," describing both a subgenre and the associated car, dance, fashion, and drug culture. The term was coined on record by Oakland rapper Keak da Sneak, who used it on 3X Krazy's "Stackin' Chips" (1997) and later as the title of his 2005 single "Super Hyphy," produced by San Jose's Traxamillion. Associated slang includes "go dumb," "ghost ride the whip" (exit or dance around a slow-rolling car), "thizz" (the drug MDMA; also a dance and facial expression called the "thizz face"), "scraper" (older full-size Buicks and Oldsmobiles), and "yadadamean." Hyphy production was pioneered by Traxamillion, Rick Rock, Droop-E, Sean T, and The Mekanix. Hyphy sped up and brightened mobb music's sound with up-tempo BPMs, eccentric synth riffs, booming 808s, chopped vocal samples, and club-oriented hooks, positioning itself as the Bay's counterpart to Atlanta's crunk.

=== Key artists ===
Mac Dre founded Thizz Entertainment in 1999 (renaming his earlier Romp Records label), popularized hyphy language and the Thizzle Dance through albums including Thizzelle Washington (2002) and Ronald Dregan: Dreganomics (2004), and was a central figure in the movement's mythology before his death. E-40, already a veteran, married hyphy with his Warner Bros. / BME / Sick Wid It backing on My Ghetto Report Card (2006), which debuted at No. 3 on the Billboard 200 and No. 1 on the Top R&B/Hip-Hop Albums chart. Other key figures include Keak da Sneak, Mistah F.A.B. (Da Baydestrian, 2007), Too $hort (Blow the Whistle, 2006), The Federation (produced by Rick Rock), Dem Hoodstarz (East Palo Alto), J. Stalin (West Oakland), San Quinn, and The Pack (mentored by Too $hort).

=== "Tell Me When to Go" and national breakthrough ===
E-40 and Keak da Sneak's "Tell Me When to Go" (produced by Lil Jon), released in February 2006 as the first single from My Ghetto Report Card, peaked at No. 35 on the Billboard Hot 100, No. 15 on the Hot R&B/Hip-Hop Songs chart, and No. 8 on Hot Rap Songs; it was certified platinum by the RIAA on February 2, 2024. It was also the first hip-hop single to premiere online, on the homepage of MySpace.com. Despite a 2006 MTV My Block: The Bay special, BET coverage, and brief major-label interest, the movement's national commercial crossover was short-lived, attributed by participants to Clear Channel radio consolidation and the limitations of the pre-YouTube promotional landscape.

=== Mac Dre's death ===
In the early morning of November 1, 2004, following a concert in Kansas City, Missouri, Mac Dre was shot and killed by unknown assailants who fired on his tour van; the case remains unsolved. Many Bay Area artists and nationally recognized figures including Drake, Kendrick Lamar, G-Eazy, and Snoop Dogg have cited Mac Dre as a formative influence.

=== Sideshows and scraper bikes ===
"Sideshows," i.e. impromptu gatherings in East Oakland parking lots where drivers performed donuts, ghost-rides, and street racing, predate hyphy by at least a decade and became central visual emblems of the movement. The scraper bike--a youth bicycle with spokes wrapped in colored duct tape and tinfoil--was created around 2006–07 by Tyrone "Baybe Champ" Stevenson Jr. and his cousin Avery Pittman; the Trunk Boiz's 2007 viral video "Scraper Bike" popularized the concept, and the Original Scraper Bike Team became a 501(c)(3) nonprofit in 2014.

== Modern era (2010–present) ==
Hyphy's musical DNA continued to surface in the DJ Mustard production sound of the mid-2010s, and in crossover hits such as Sage the Gemini and Iamsu!'s "Gas Pedal" (2013). E-40 remained the scene's central figure, releasing multi-volume Block Brochure series throughout the decade.

New Bay Area artists include G-Eazy (Gerald Gillum, Oakland), whose When It's Dark Out (2015) went platinum; Kehlani (Oakland), whose You Should Be Here (2015) established her as a major R&B/hip-hop artist; Kamaiyah (Oakland), whose 2016 mixtape A Good Night in the Ghetto drew on mobb music and earned co-signs from YG and Drake; Nef the Pharaoh (Vallejo), a Sick Wid It signee whose "Big Tymin'" broke nationally in 2015; SOB x RBE, a Vallejo quartet who appeared on the Black Panther soundtrack in 2018; and San Francisco's Larry June, whose The Great Escape (2023, with The Alchemist) made him the most commercially successful Fillmore rapper in the genre's history.

== Characteristics ==
=== Production style ===
Bay Area hip-hop production is characterized by prominent low-end "slap," built around the Roland TR-808 drum machine, sparse and often dark synth lines, less reliance on P-Funk samples than Los Angeles G-funk, and frequent use of live bass and keyboard overdubs added to drum-machine programming. The mobb era favored slow-to-mid tempos; hyphy shifted to faster, bouncier structures while retaining the region's emphasis on bass weight.

=== Slang and linguistic innovation ===
The Bay Area is widely recognized as one of American hip-hop's most productive sources of slang. E-40 alone is credited with popularizing or coining "hella," "fasho," "slaps," "feelin' myself," "captain save a hoe," "popo," "broccoli," "scrilla," "Yay Area," and "yadadamean," among many others; he published E-40's Book of Slang, Volume 1 through Murder Dog magazine in 2003.

=== Entrepreneurship and the independent model ===
The Bay Area is consistently cited as the origin point for the do-it-yourself model in hip-hop — trunk sales, independent pressing, consignment distribution, and artist-owned labels. Too $hort's hand-sold cassettes in the early 1980s, E-40's Sick Wid It Records, and Mac Dre's Thizz Entertainment are each cited as blueprints that later influenced Master P's No Limit Records and the Cash Money business model. Hieroglyphics Imperium Recordings was among the first artist-owned rap labels to maintain a dedicated Internet presence in the mid-1990s.

== See also ==
- West Coast hip hop
- Southern hip hop
- Hyphy
- Mobb music
- Turntablism
- Bay Area punk
- Hieroglyphics (group)
- Sick Wid It Records
- Invisibl Skratch Piklz
- Too $hort
- E-40
- Mac Dre
