= Murder Dog =

American independent hip-hop magazine (1993–c. 2014)

- A 2004 cover of Murder Dog, celebrating the life of Mac Dre.
- Editor: Eric Cope, a.k.a. Black Dog Bone
- Categories: Hip-hop music
- Frequency: Quarterly (approximately)
- Founded: August 1993
- Final issue: c. 2014 (print); continued online
- Country: United States
- Based in: Vallejo, California
- Website: murderdog.com

Murder Dog was an American independent hip-hop magazine published from Vallejo, California, from August 1993 through approximately 2014. It was founded and run by a Sri Lankan-born photographer and publisher Eric Cope, better known as Black Dog Bone, who served simultaneously as founder, publisher, editor-in-chief, photographer, and primary writer throughout the magazine's print run.

Where mainstream hip-hop publications such as The Source, XXL, and Rap Pages centered their coverage on the East Coast music industry, Murder Dog focused on underground and independent rap artists from the San Francisco Bay Area, the American South, and the Midwest, covering many future stars before they received attention from larger outlets. Red Bull Music Academy Daily, in a 2014 feature on the magazine, described its 21-year print run as "the only lasting documentation of hundreds of local stars who never managed to crossover."

== History ==
=== Founding ===
Black Dog Bone conceived Murder Dog while studying photography at the San Francisco Art Institute in the early 1990s. Unable to gain access to rap artists as an unknown photographer, he concluded that publishing a magazine would open doors: "I thought, if I were a magazine I could take photographs of any rappers I wanted." During his final semester, he devoted an independent study period to producing the first issue.

The magazine was assembled by hand. Black Dog Bone could not type at the time and had the layouts hand-pasted by a fellow student. It was printed at a Mission District shop that also produced Maximum RockNRoll and the Black Panther Party newspaper. He funded the first press run of 2,000 copies by writing a check against a bank account that held $25. "So that's the beginning of Murder Dog — a bad check," he later said.

The first issue appeared in August 1993 with a cover featuring Young "D" Boyz, a Vallejo rap group, under the cover line: "Uncut Vallejo Game — This Ain't No Hip Hop We Players Out Here." Early photography subjects during this period included Wu-Tang Clan, whom Black Dog Bone photographed in San Francisco's Fillmore district, and Fugees.

=== Relocation to Vallejo ===
After the first issue, Black Dog Bone moved from San Francisco to Vallejo, settling on the south side of the city near the railroad tracks. The move was deliberate: he had become interested in Vallejo's rap scene after hearing a tape by the local group Funky Aztecs, and chose a home within a block of E-40's residence in the Hillside neighborhood. "I knew E-40 was from Hillside," he later said. "I wanted to live close to E-40."

The first issue reached Memphis, Tennessee, through a copy obtained by John Shaw at the distribution company Select-O-Hits. This contact opened access to the Southern rap scene, and beginning with the second issue, Murder Dog began covering artists from the South at a time when no major hip-hop publication was doing so. "After that I'm like, 'Fuck the East Coast,'" Black Dog Bone recalled. "No one even heard of the South. No one heard of Bay Area."

=== Growth ===
As the magazine established a national reputation, artists and independent labels began advertising heavily. Master P, once featured on a cover with artwork produced by Pen & Pixel Graphics, became one of the magazine's largest advertisers, purchasing up to eight ad pages per issue at approximately $10,000 per issue. Cash Money Records founders Bryan "Birdman" Williams and Ronald "Slim" Williams followed, placing ads after observing the magazine's influence on the underground market.

At its peak, the magazine's printing costs reached $100,000 per issue. Murder Dog maintained a policy of sending free copies to approximately 10,000 incarcerated subscribers each issue, at a cost the magazine's accountant estimated at $2 per copy, a practice that Black Dog Bone continued despite the financial strain. The magazine declined advertising from major labels including Def Jam and Interscope in order to remain focused on independent and underground artists.

Distribution was handled nationally and internationally. Back issues became collectible items. By the mid-2010s certain issues were selling for $150 to $200, with demand coming from readers in India, Norway, Japan, and Mexico.

=== End of print publication ===
Murder Dog ceased regular print distribution around 2014. The magazine's website, murderdog.com, has continued to publish hip-hop coverage online, with a stated focus on global and African rap scenes.

== Editorial approach ==
=== Regional and underground focus ===
Murder Dog deliberately avoided the industry-centric perspective of mainstream hip-hop publications, which Black Dog Bone viewed as overly concentrated on New York artists and East Coast labels. The magazine covered rap scenes from the San Francisco Bay Area, the American South (including New Orleans, Memphis, and Houston), the Midwest (including Kansas City), Detroit, and eventually international scenes in Africa, Japan, and Europe.

Red Bull Music Academy Daily observed that this regional focus proved prescient: "By the turn of the century New York's grip on hip hop had begun to loosen and all of these micro-scenes flooded the market. Most of the once-independent rap artists and labels to ride this wave to stardom — E-40, Three 6 Mafia, No Limit, Cash Money, Tech N9ne, Insane Clown Posse — had already seen their earliest pre-fame press in the pages of Murder Dog."

=== Staff and writing style ===
The magazine was produced by Black Dog Bone, his wife, and a small rotating staff of unpaid contributors with no formal journalism training, which was an explicit editorial preference. "I found that the people who had degrees were not creative or interesting," Black Dog Bone said. "The ones that were fans of Hip Hop were the best. They were all unique and different." Matt Sonzala, one of the magazine's longtime contributors, summarized its mission as: "The number one mission was to bring a voice to the voiceless. That's all, that's it."

Interviews were unedited and lengthy, frequently extending beyond the page margins. Photography was similarly unpolished, with covers that often depicted artists throwing up gang signs or holding firearms.

=== Prison distribution ===
Murder Dog sent free subscriptions to approximately 10,000 incarcerated readers per issue, a practice maintained throughout the magazine's print run despite its cost. Reader accounts and the magazine's own Amazon book listing confirm this was a defining aspect of the publication's identity and reach.

== Coverage and notable firsts ==
Black Dog Bone claimed that Murder Dog was the first publication to feature the following artists on a magazine cover: Master P, Three 6 Mafia, Rick Ross, Lil Wayne, Juvenile, 50 Cent, Machine Gun Kelly, Outkast, and Young Jeezy. DJ Paul of Three 6 Mafia confirmed the significance of the magazine's early coverage, stating: "I still have a special framed copy of the Three 6 [Mafia] cover with us holding the guns, and the one with me wearing the 666 shirt."

The magazine's coverage extended beyond the mainstream to document artists who never achieved national recognition. As Black Dog Bone described it: "We have photos and interviews of artists who are locked up or got killed, artists that started Hip Hop in their town and had a big influence on the other rappers from that area, but they have never been interviewed in any other magazine."

Tech N9ne, founder of Strange Music, credited the magazine with providing critical early exposure for underground Midwest rap: "Back when Travis O'Guin and I first started Strange, it was hard for underground cats like me to get exposure in the press. Not a lot of magazines were covering the Midwest rap scene or underground music at all. Black Dog Bone and everyone else at Murder Dog were the exception; they probably put me on that cover a dozen times."

== Over The Edge Books ==
In 2014, the Red Bull Music Academy published a lengthy interview with Black Dog Bone that was subsequently picked up by Gawker under the headline "How a Punk from the Jungle Started a Legendary Hardcore Rap Magazine." This article caught the attention of Paul Stewart, publisher of Over The Edge Books, who contacted Black Dog Bone about republishing archival content from the magazine in book form.

The partnership produced two initial volumes:

- Murder Dog The Interviews Vol. 1 (Over The Edge Books, 2016; ISBN 978-1944082055): features interviews with BG, The Jacka, Too $hort, C-Murder, Bun B, DJ Screw, Lil Wayne, ICP, Ice Cube, E-40, Jay Rock, Tech N9ne, and others.
- Murder Dog The Covers Vol. 1 (Over The Edge Books, 2015): reproduces covers featuring 50 Cent, Outkast, Ice Cube, E-40, Three 6 Mafia, Cash Money Records, Rick Ross, Young Jeezy, Snoop Dogg, Webbie, Master P, Mac Dre, Tech N9ne, ICP, Mobb Deep, UGK, T.I., Too $hort, Soulja Slim, and others.

Additional volumes covering Tech N9ne, The Jacka, Master P, and the rap scenes of the Bay Area, Detroit, Atlanta, and Memphis were announced as forthcoming.

== About the founder ==
Black Dog Bone grew up in the wilderness of northern Sri Lanka, where he was raised near a shaman named Apu Hami and lived largely in isolation from urban life. His family later moved to Colombo, where he described feeling like an outsider. He subsequently emigrated to the United States, where he played in a punk band in Iowa before enrolling at the San Francisco Art Institute to study photography. He founded Murder Dog in 1993 as a student project and later moved to Vallejo, where he lived for the duration of the magazine's print run.

He has conducted all public-facing activity under the name Black Dog Bone and has declined to publicly confirm his legal name or date of birth. A 2022 profile in CVLTNation identified him as Eric Cope.

== See also ==
- The Source (magazine)
- XXL (magazine)
- Bay Area hip-hop
- Southern hip hop
- Hyphy
- E-40
- Mac Dre
- Master P
- Three 6 Mafia
- Tech N9ne
- Maximum RockNRoll
