= 924 Gilman Street =

Music venue in Berkeley, California

Coordinates: 37.879632°N 122.299308°W

Alternative Music Foundation
- Gilman
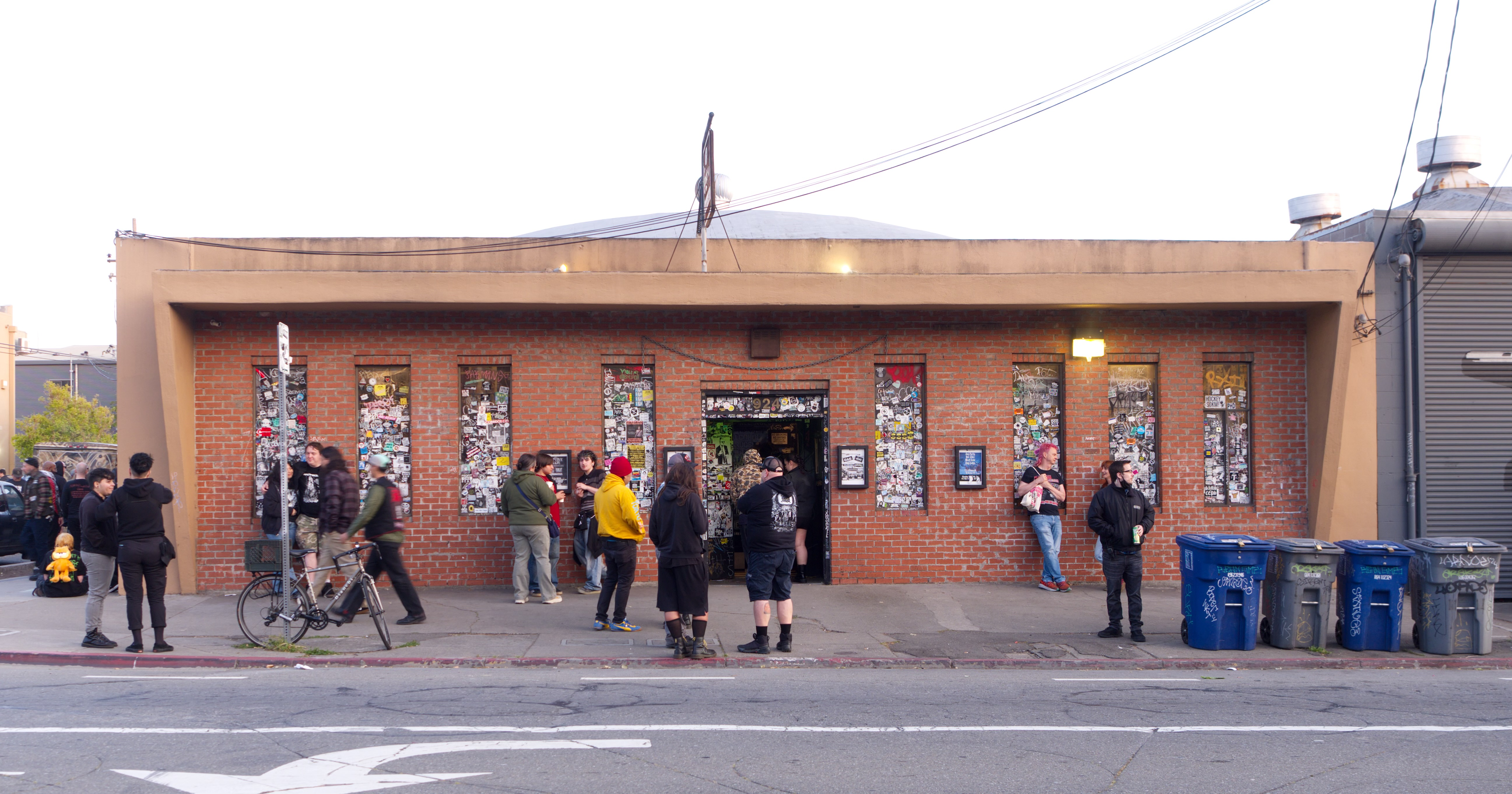
- The facade of 924 Gilman Street in Spring 2025
- Interactive map of Alternative Music Foundation
- Address: 924 Gilman Street
- Location: West Berkeley, Berkeley, California, United States
- Owner: None
- Operator: Alternative Music Foundation
- Capacity: 299
- Events: Punk rock; pop-punk; hardcore punk; ska punk; heavy metal; industrial metal; grindcore; hip-hop
- Public transit: Orange Line BART at North Berkeley; Red Line BART at North Berkeley; AC Transit 12, 52, 72M, 72R to Gilman Street

Construction
- Opened: 1986

Website
- https://www.924gilman.org/

The Alternative Music Foundation located at 924 Gilman Street, commonly referred to as 924 Gilman or simply Gilman, is a non-profit, all-ages, collectively organized music club. It is located in the West Berkeley area of Berkeley, California. Gilman is widely regarded as the springboard for the '90s punk revival and is known for its associations with Bay Area punk bands NOFX, Green Day, Operation Ivy, Rancid, AFI, and the Offspring, and playwright Miranda July.

924 Gilman remains an active club, hosting over twenty concerts a month, and remains a local hub for community organizing, graffiti, and performance art. According to National Geographic, "It remains the only venue of its kind left in California — a place with no owner, where takings are split evenly between bands and young children can watch their older siblings perform."

== History ==
=== Founding and early years (1986–1990) ===
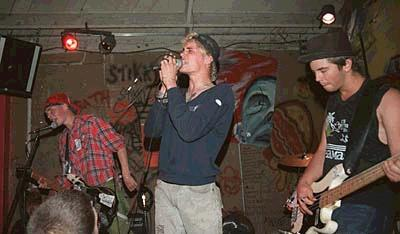
Operation Ivy playing at Gilman in early 1988

Jim Widess purchased the building that would become the club in 1984, converting a previously unprofitable supermarket into a boutique workshop for caning. Widess was befriended by Victor Hayden in 1985, who expressed interest in using his industrial storage space as a venue for live music.

In parallel, punk rock fan and Maximumrocknroll founder Tim Yohannan sought to found a local, all-ages music space where bands could play and interact with audience members free of the structure of conventional music promotion. Although Yohannan initially had misgivings about the 924 Gilman Street location spotted by Hayden, he was ultimately persuaded that the building was a suitable space for the project that was envisioned. Negotiations began with the landlord and in April 1986 a lease was signed.

The organizing circle was expanded with a view to raising the $40,000 needed for rent and remodeling and for generating the volunteers necessary to make the construction project happen. Yohannan made use of his political connections and experience gained as a campaign volunteer for Berkeley Citizen's Action Group, an organization that had won majority control of the Berkeley City Council, and was able to call upon friends sitting on various city boards, urging their cooperation with the new venture. Berkeley mayor Gus Newport was supportive and project organizers took care of every detail into winning the tacit approval for the project from businesses and residents of the area. The landlord also proved himself reliable and supportive of the goals of his new tenants.

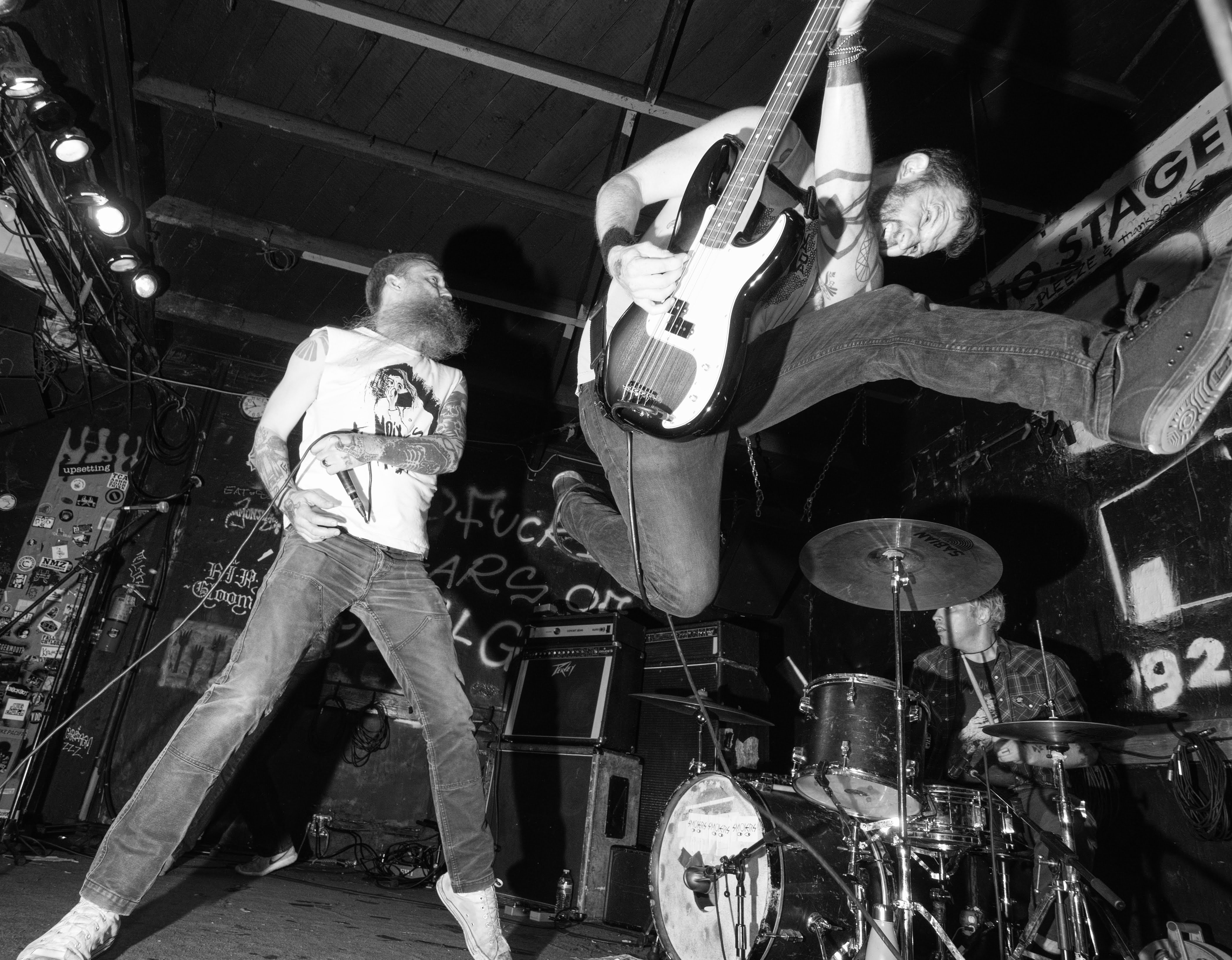
The band Shitcoffins on the 924 Gilman stage

Tim Yohannan later recalled:

We didn't know shit about construction, and people were coming out of the woodwork, just showing up and helping—people who had the skills we needed, carpenters, plumbers, electricians. We had to build new bathrooms, etc., and pass the inspections. We got our final approval from the city the afternoon of our first show, which was New Year's Eve, December 1986.

Rent on the 2,000-square-foot building was $2,000 per month at the time of the club's launch—regarded as a reasonable and manageable rate.

On December 31, 1986, the first musical performance was held at 924 Gilman. In its initial phase, hardcore punk shows were held three days a week—on Friday and Saturday nights as well as Sunday matinees. This quickly proved to be overwhelming for club volunteers, however, and as an alternative non-hardcore shows began to be run on Fridays by a separate crew of organizers. These Friday shows were more poorly attended than the Saturday night and Sunday afternoon hardcore extravaganzas but nevertheless served their purpose of providing an alternative venue to bands seeking to escape the grim reality of 21-and-over bar shows while allowing core volunteers to avoid the burnout associated with excessive event scheduling. This necessary scheduling adjustment had the serendipitous effect of diversifying and broadening the base of support for the 924 Gilman space.

Although the Gilman "warehouse" provided a vital all-ages venue and spawned a vibrant local musical scene, its success was neither inevitable nor linear. On September 11, 1988, citing the "physical and emotional exhaustion" of volunteers, ongoing problems with vandalism, and financial difficulties resulting from a $16,000 legal award to a slam dancer who had fallen and broken his arm in the pit, and expiration of the building lease, Gilman shut its doors. In a published eulogy by Tim Yohannan, Gilman was remembered as a fun place where "the old macho bullshit got attacked" and a stand had been made against "creeping racist and fascist crap." The club's core volunteers were not despondent, Yohannan noted, and hoped to "arrange special shows at other existing venues" in the future.

A note was scrawled on a scrap of paper and taped to the window by Yohannan, noting that the Gilman Street Project was "now closed permanently due to lack of the creative juices necessary to make it worthwhile." Yohannan added that "apathy and taking Gilman for granted" had "led to a consumerist attitude" and that the decision had been made by core volunteers to "work together in other ways."

Although the September closure spelled an end to Tim Yohannan's personal connection with the club, core volunteers almost immediately reorganized to launch a "new club" at the 924 Gilman location, based upon the core principles established by the previous venture.

The sudden closure of Ruthie's Inn in 1987 left a significant void for fans of heavy metal, and contributed greatly to Gilman's renewal.

=== Growth and mainstream notoriety (1990–2016) ===
Performance artist Miranda July used the club to stage her first play, The Lifers, in 1992. The sixty-minute play was written and directed by July during her last year of high school, and was cast through solicitations placed in the East Bay Express. The play is based on July's real-life correspondence with a prisoner serving a sentence for murder. July's unconventional request to stage a theatrical performance was embraced by the community, a gesture she would later refer to as indispensable to her career. Following this she wrote and directed two more plays at Gilman, both of which she appeared in as an actor.

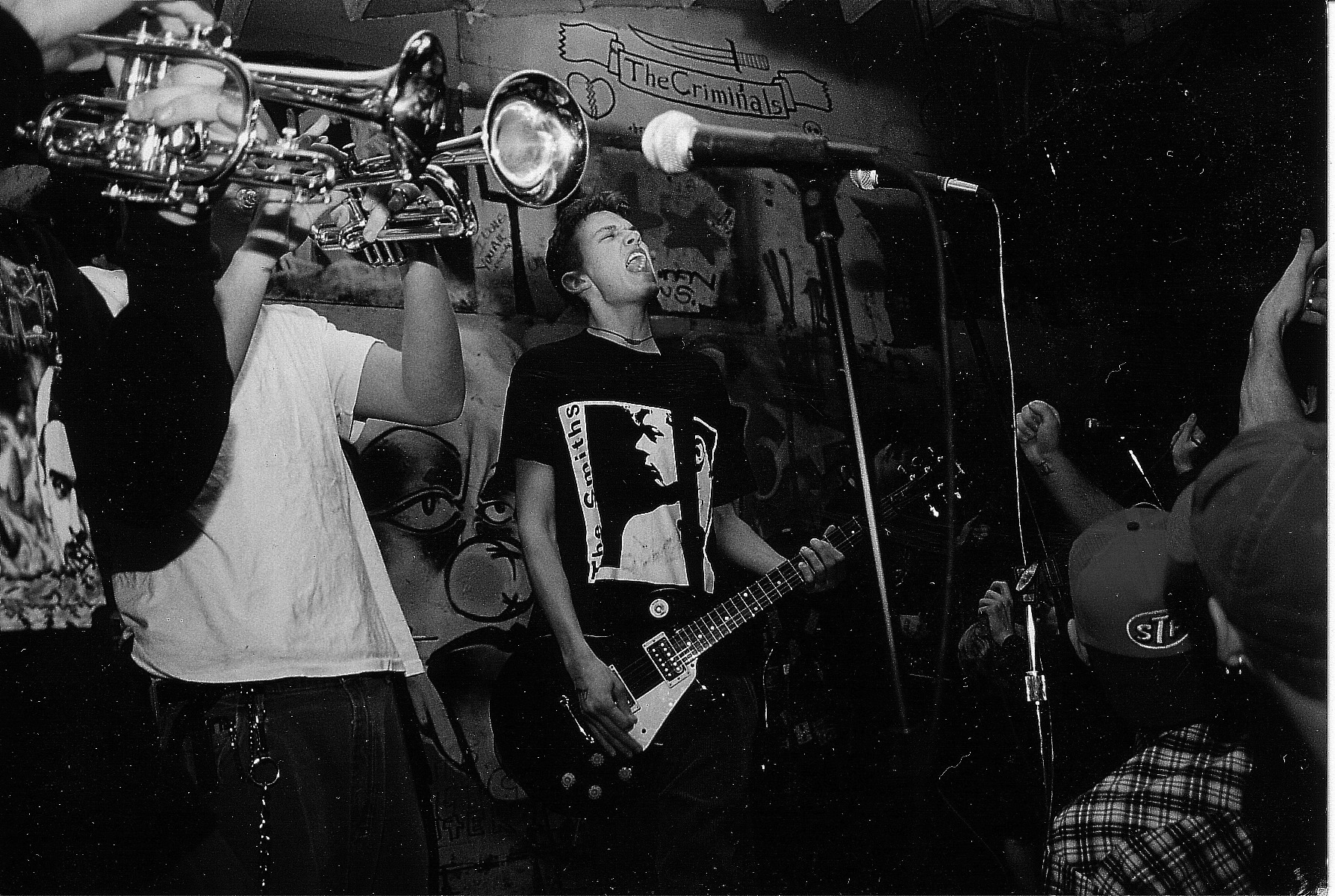
Link 80 headlining 924 Gilman in 1997

The 1991 release of Kerplunk by Gilman mainstays Green Day brought widespread media attention to the club. Upon their signing to Reprise Records in 1994, Green Day was banned from the venue citing their "no major labels" policy. Their band's first record with Reprise, Dookie, would become an RIAA-certified Double Diamond record, selling over 20 million copies in the U.S. alone.

On May 7, 1994, an incident occurred in which former Dead Kennedys singer Jello Biafra was assaulted and injured. A group of rough slam dancers in the mosh pit, including one known by the pseudonym "Cretin," knocked Biafra into a chair, with another rolling over his legs, causing serious damage to one knee and leg. A fight ensued, during which Biafra is said to have been knocked to the floor and kicked in the head by "Cretin." During the incident others are said to have taunted Biafra, yelling "rich rock star" and "sellout." Biafra was hospitalized, where it was determined that he suffered detached ligaments and a broken leg. Biafra was also forced to cancel a scheduled spoken word tour as a result of the injuries he suffered. Biafra held Maximumrocknroll indirectly responsible for the incident, claiming that his assailants were repeating allegations that he was a "rich rock star" made in a column that had recently appeared in the magazine.

Notable bands associated with the club during the early 2000s include Ted Leo, Chumbawamba, Sleater-Kinney, and Third Eye Blind.

=== Post-pandemic revival (2022–present) ===
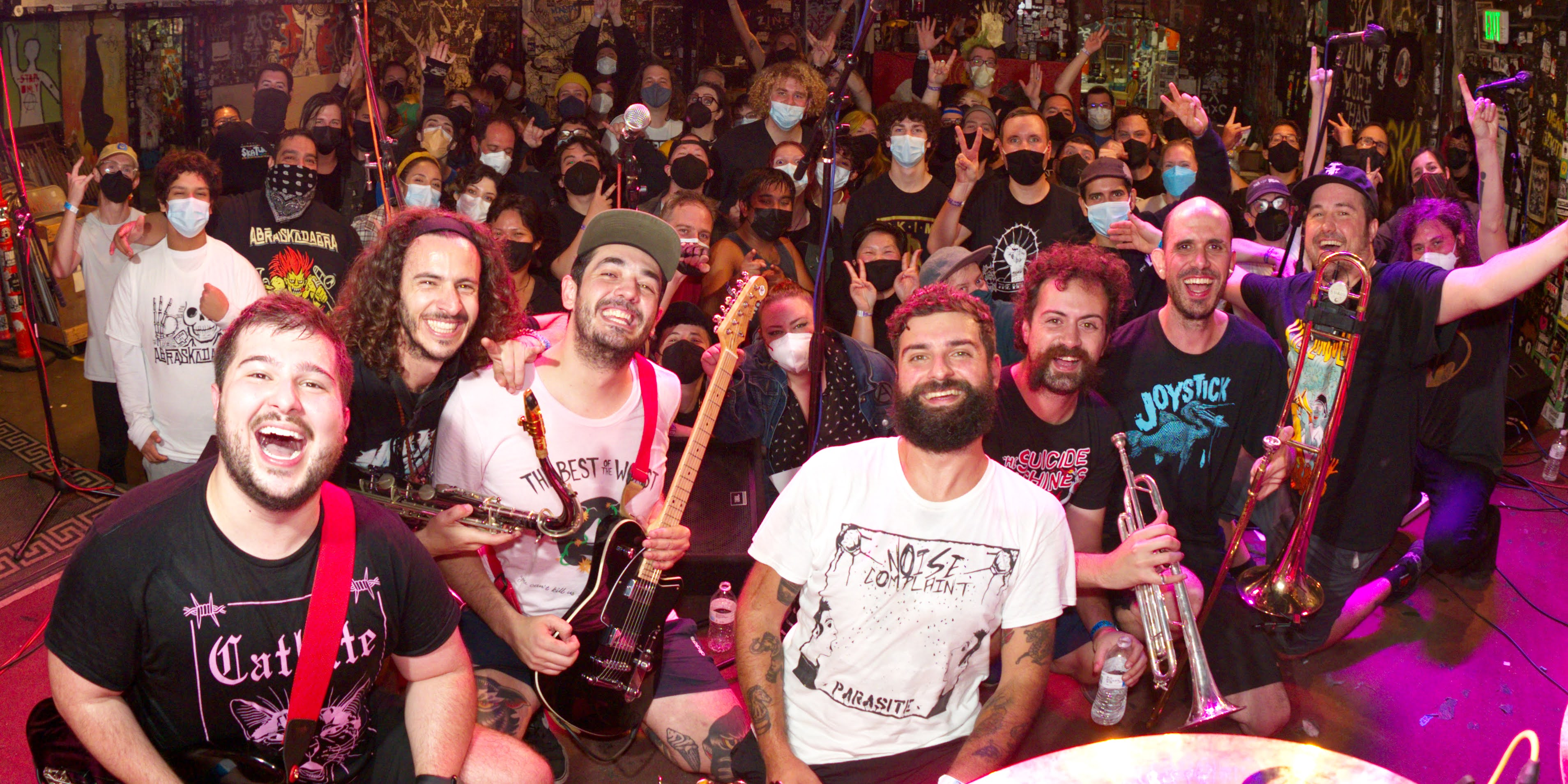
Brazilian band Abraskadabra at 924 Gilman after its re-opening from COVID-19

The COVID-19 pandemic forced the club to shut its doors in 2020, leading to an unprecedented period of inactivity. During the closure, volunteers organized online fundraisers, virtual concerts, and merchandise sales to support the nonprofit financially. Reopening efforts in 2021 and 2022 focused on re-engaging the community, repairing the physical space, and updating operational policies to prioritize safety and accessibility.

By 2024, 924 Gilman had entered its highest-activity period since 1988. The venue currently hosts over twenty nights of performances a month, most of which are bills consisting of five to six bands. As of 2025, every performing band gets paid a percentage of ticket sales.

In 2025, a collective of 924 Gilman alumni established The Planetarium in Richmond, a second all-ages venue with a focus on unconventional music and variety arts.

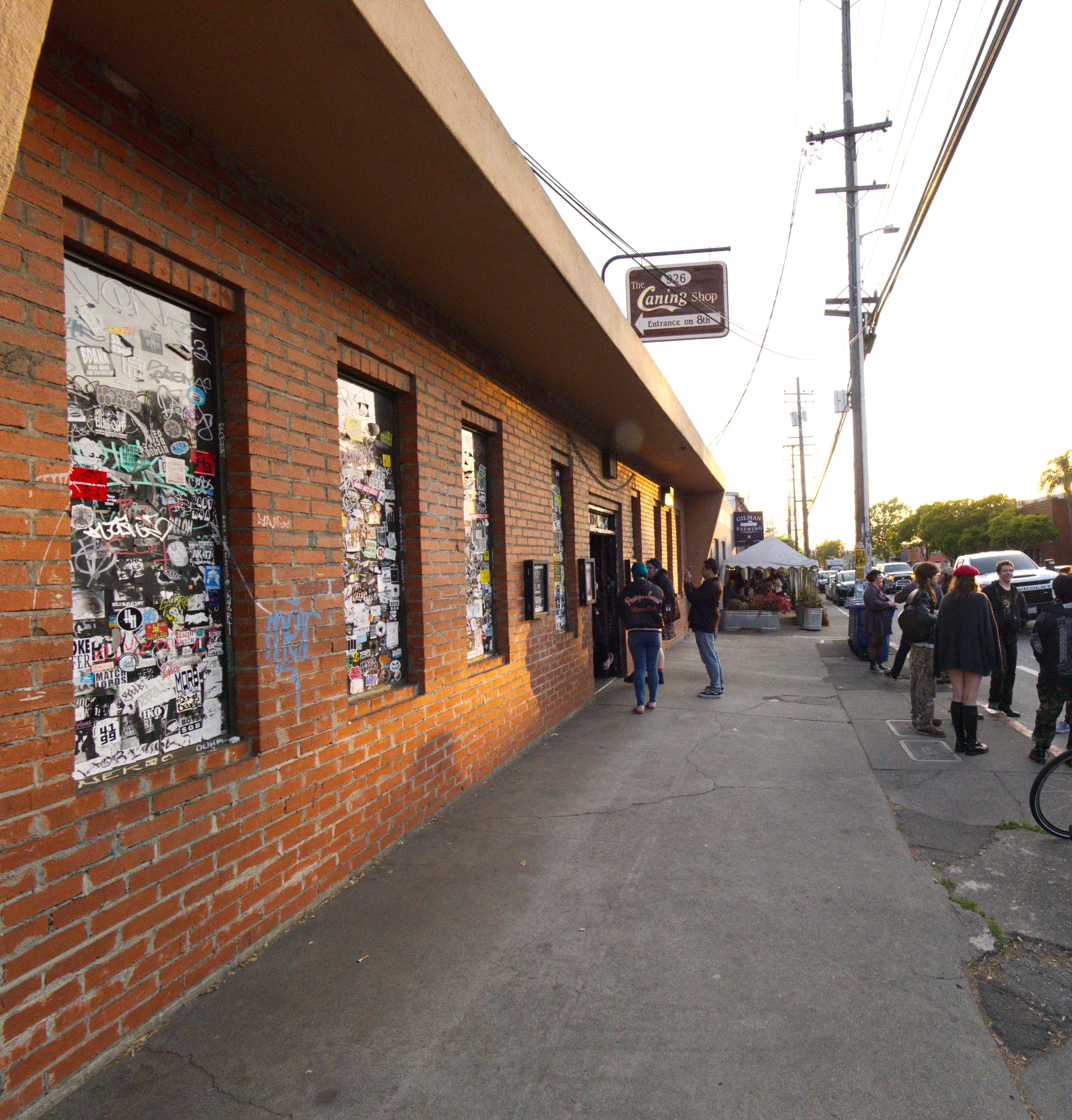
The public entrance, facing Gilman Street.

== Organizational structure ==
=== Rules and code of conduct ===
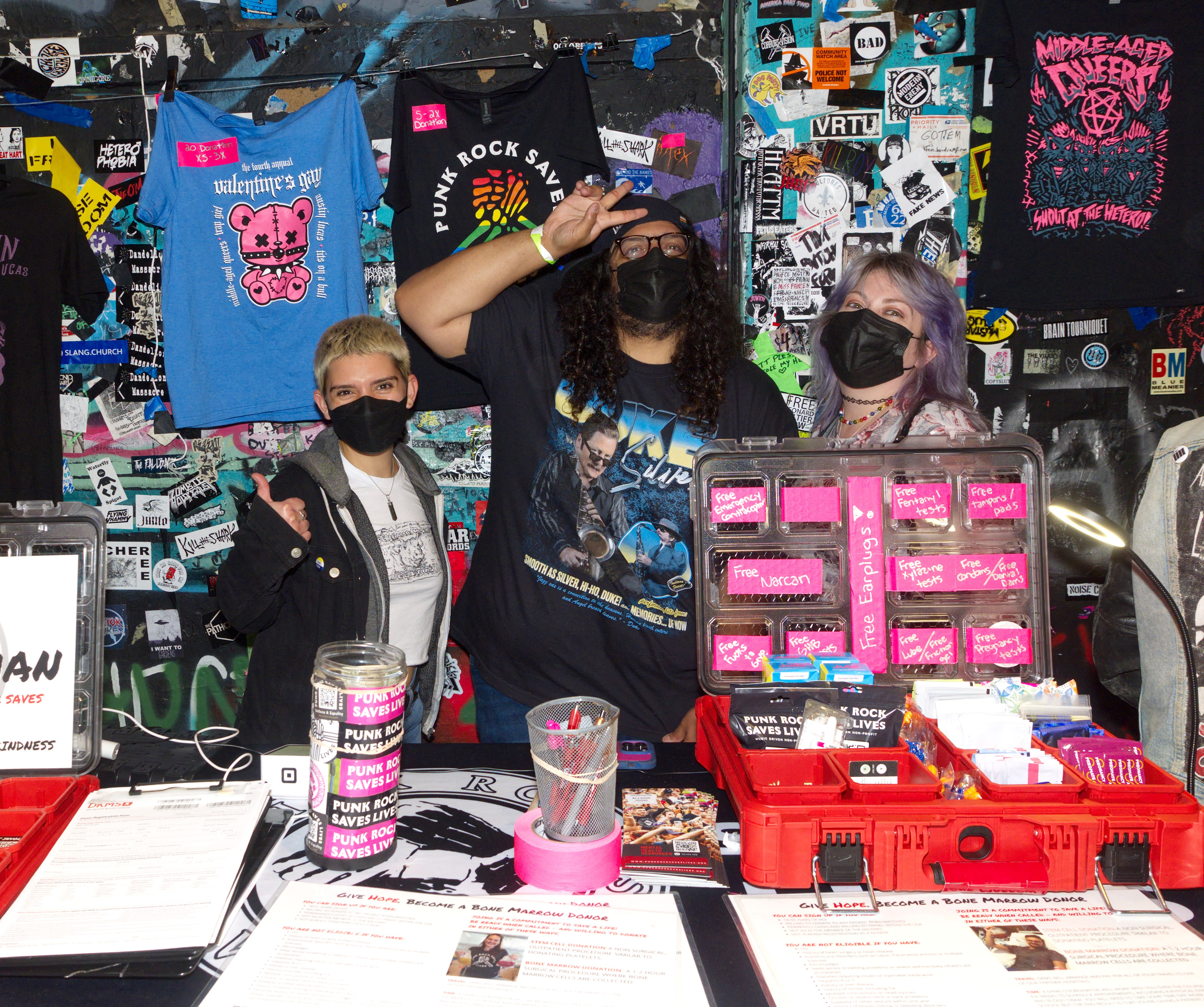
Volunteers handing out earplugs, narcan, condoms, and fentanyl test strips.

As one early participant recalled, "in order to not be closed down by local police we had to have rules, such as no drinking in or around the club, no fighting, things like that." This necessitated a regularized approach to security and resulted in events that were less violent than the 1980s hardcore norm, providing a more or less "safe environment" and sense of collective responsibility.

== Legacy ==
=== Influence on punk and DIY culture ===
The venue saw the first public appearance of Operation Ivy, a thrashing ska-punk outfit that gained nearly instantaneous local popularity, and was a proving grounds for the young Green Day—the albums of whom helped to launch the Lookout Records empire of Larry Livermore and David Hayes. The eclectic sounds of this and other pioneer "Gilman bands" stood in contrast to the speed metal and ultra-aggressive hardcore that dominated the punk world during the middle 1980s.

Staying true to the "independent spirit" was also a major component of the club's philosophy, and many of the bands that started out at Gilman found themselves on the outs with the club after achieving mainstream success. Green Day's song "86" from their album Insomniac is about being banned from the club after their major label debut Dookie was released.

=== Genres and musical styles promoted ===
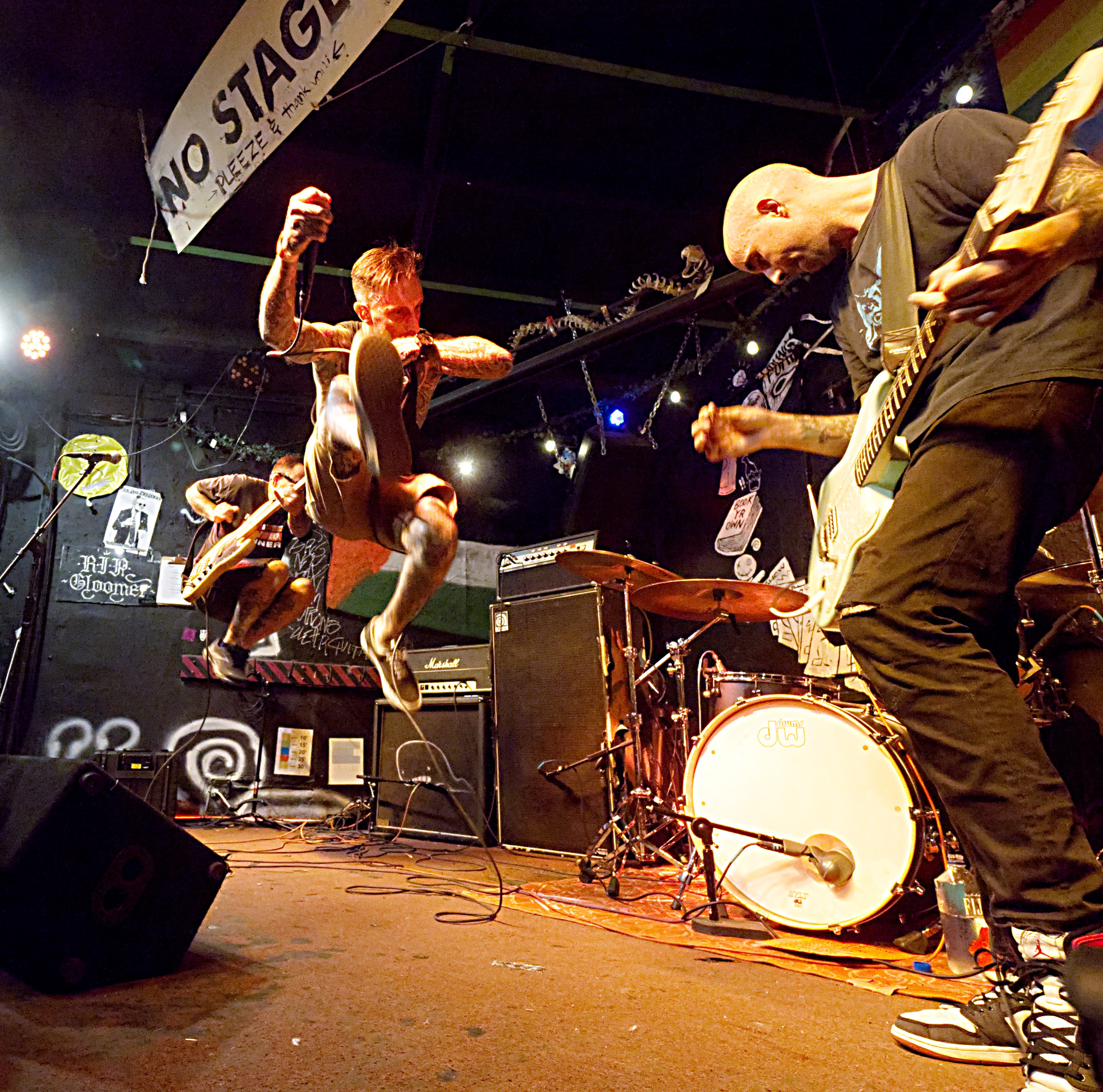
A performance by Living Eyes in 2024.

Gilman showcases mostly punk rock, running the gamut from hardcore punk and grindcore to pop-punk and ska punk, including as well industrial metal and, most recently, hip-hop.

Bands with major label contracts, including AFI, the Offspring, and Green Day, are only allowed to play the club when membership approves that individual show, a policy that enabled Green Day to play at Gilman again at least twice since they signed with a major label.

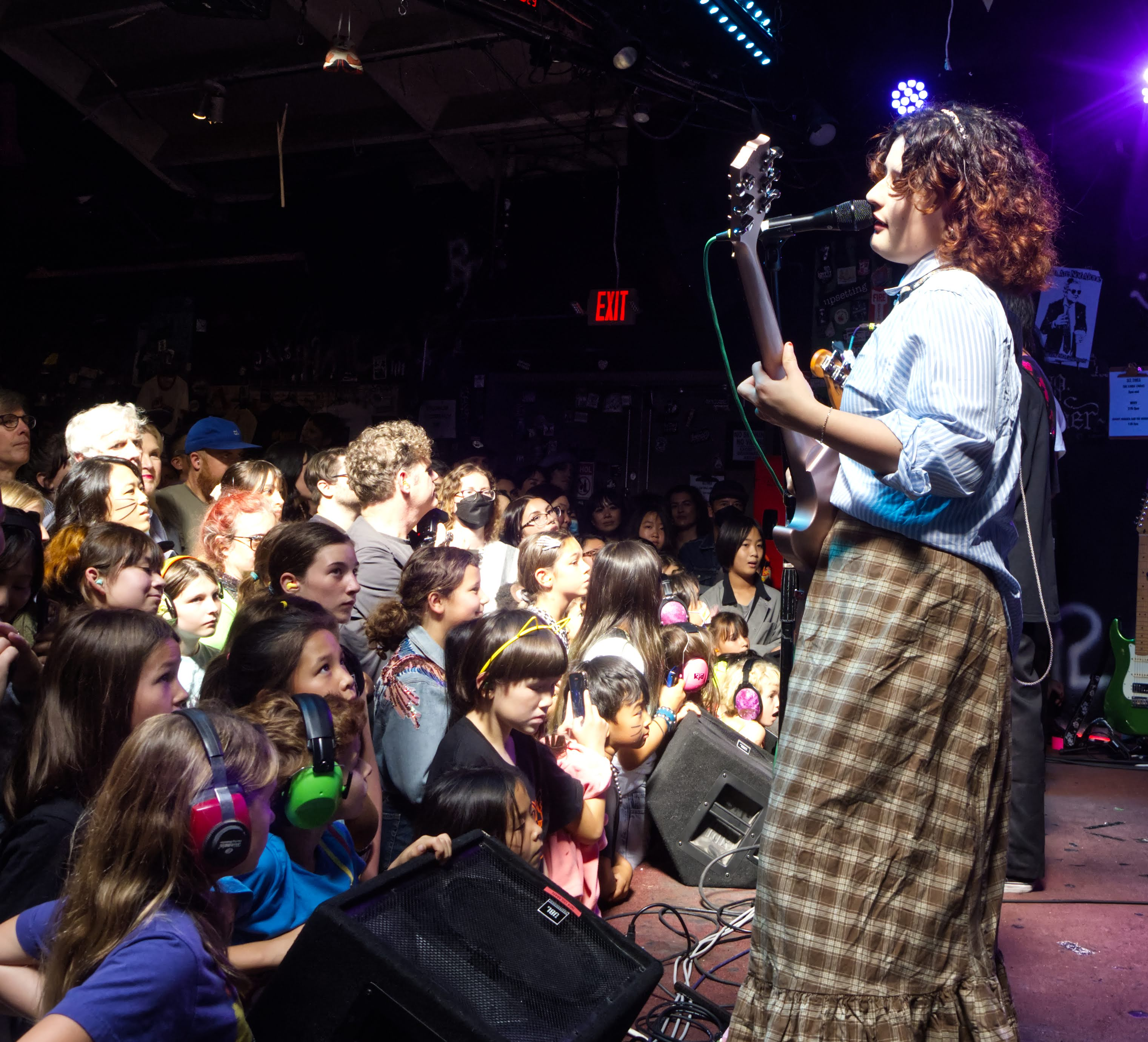
The Linda Lindas playing 924 Gilman in 2024

== In popular culture ==
A 2004 history of the club, 924 Gilman: The Story So Far, was written and edited by Brian Edge, who collected memories and anecdotes from many of the seminal contributors to the club's day-to-day operations from 1986 through publication in 2004.

The venue is the subject of a 2008 documentary by Jack Curran, 924 Gilman St: Let's Talk About Tact & Timing... produced by record label Alternative Tentacles.

The 2017 documentary Turn It Around: The Story of East Bay Punk largely centers around Green Day and their history at 924 Gilman. Other interviewees include Kathleen Hanna, Tim Armstrong, Larry Livermore, Penelope Houston, Ian Mackaye, Jello Biafra, and Miranda July, among others.

The 2025 film Freaky Tales is partially set at 924 Gilman, depicting a fictionalized account of a clash between punks and Nazis in the late 1980s.

== Gallery ==
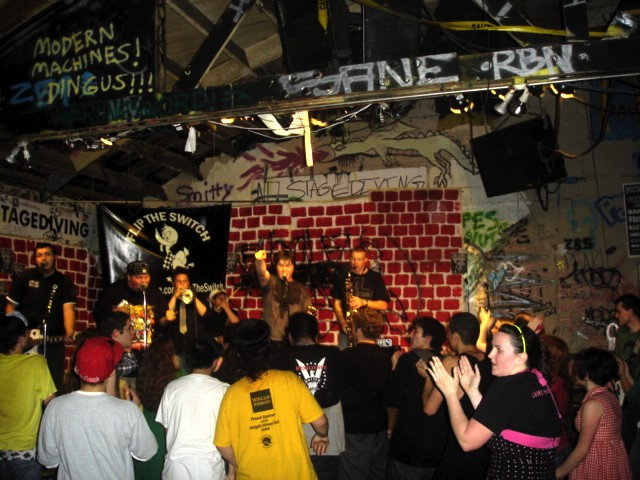
The venue in 2007.

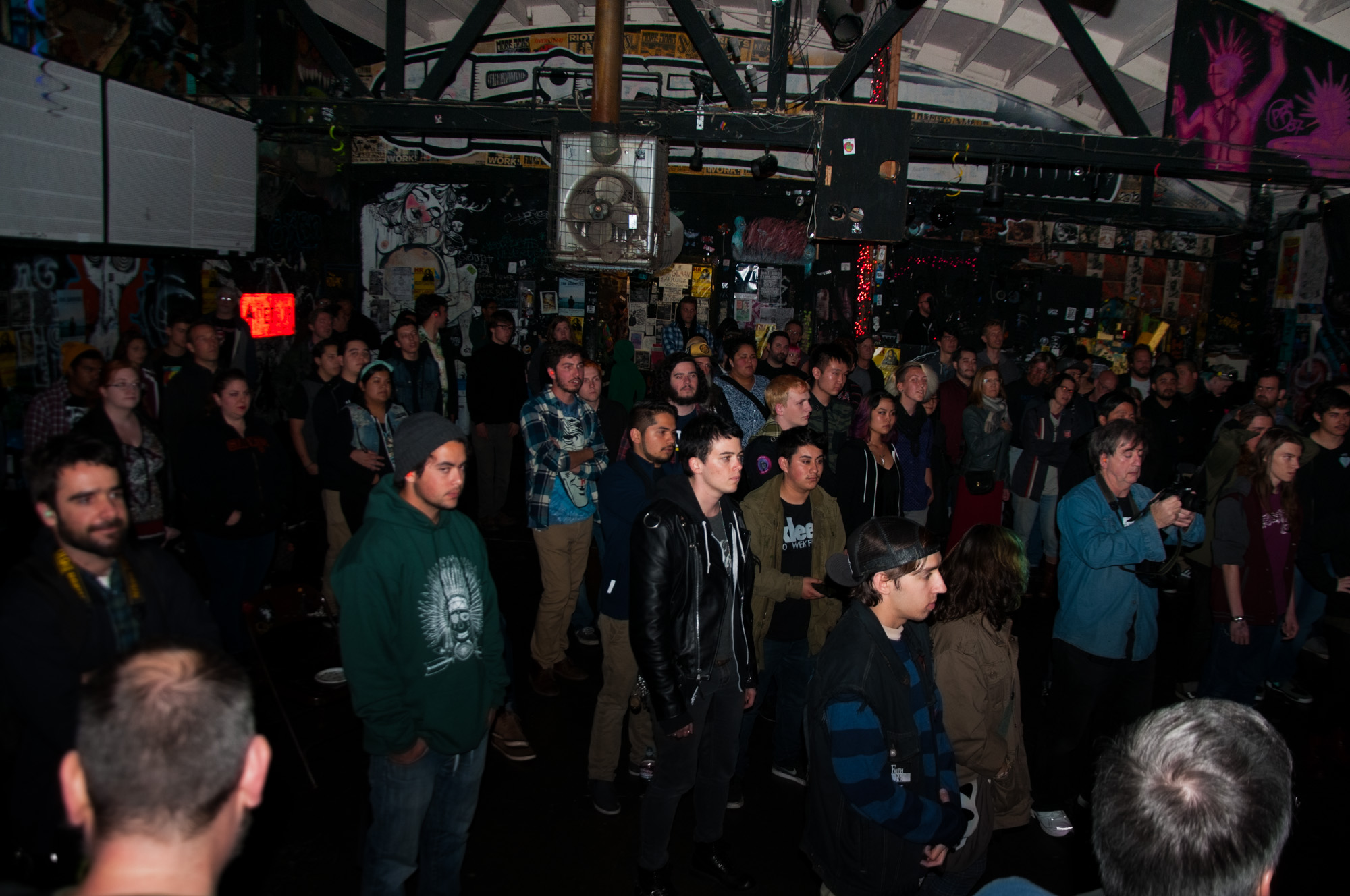
The venue in 2015.

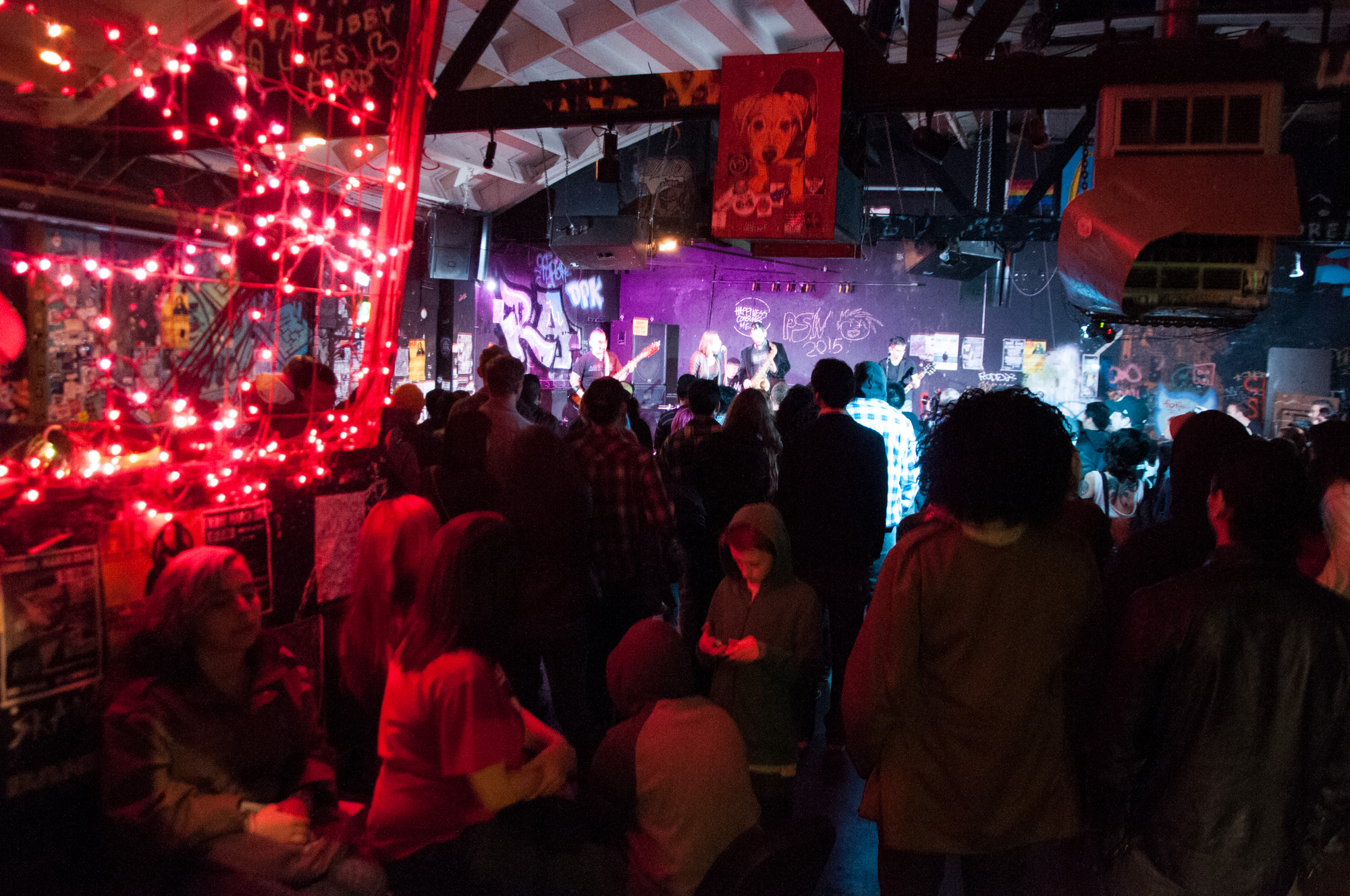
The venue in 2015, with the front of house booth visible to the left.

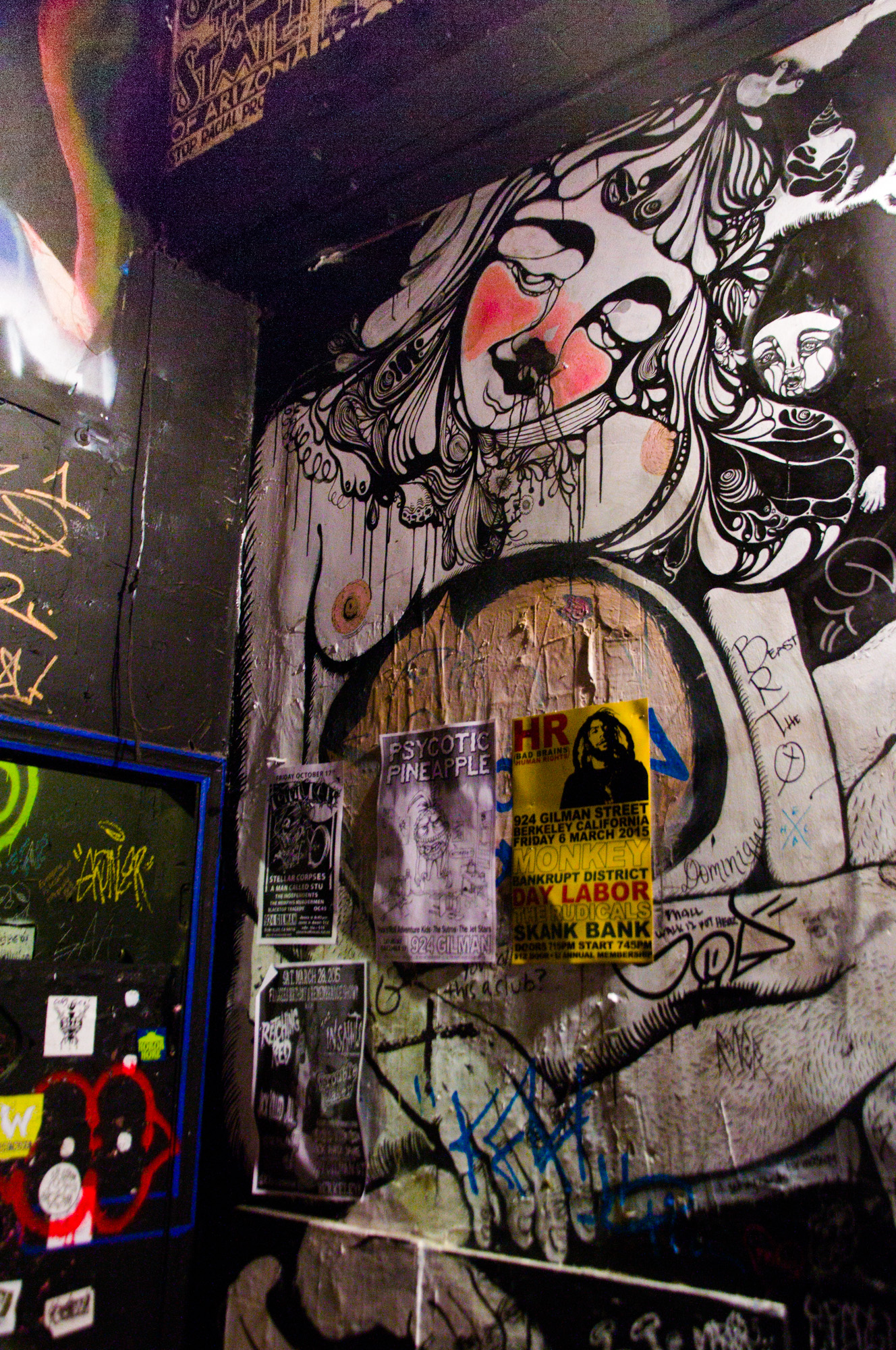
A mural on the club's interior.

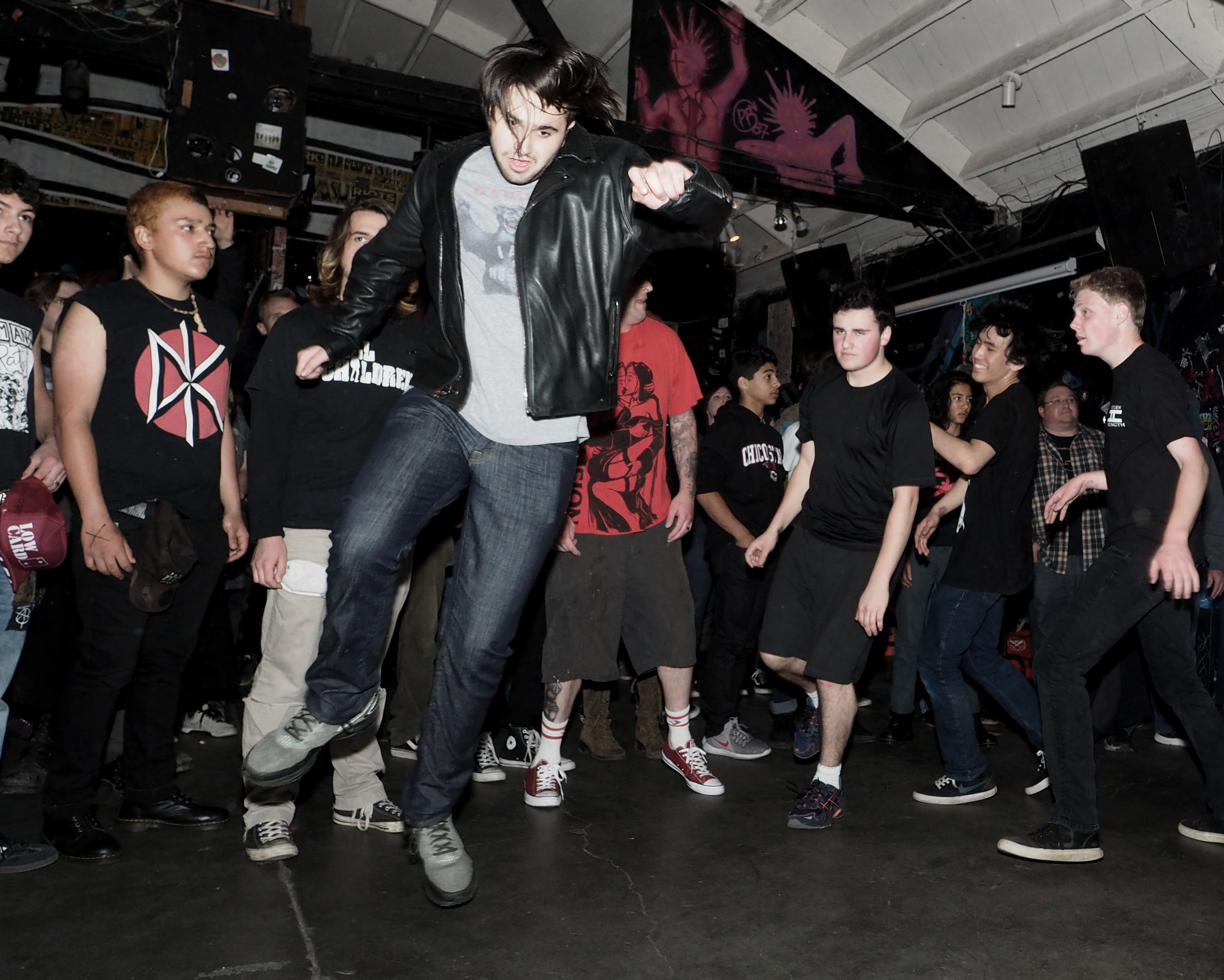
Punks skanking to a concert by Oakland band Smokers.

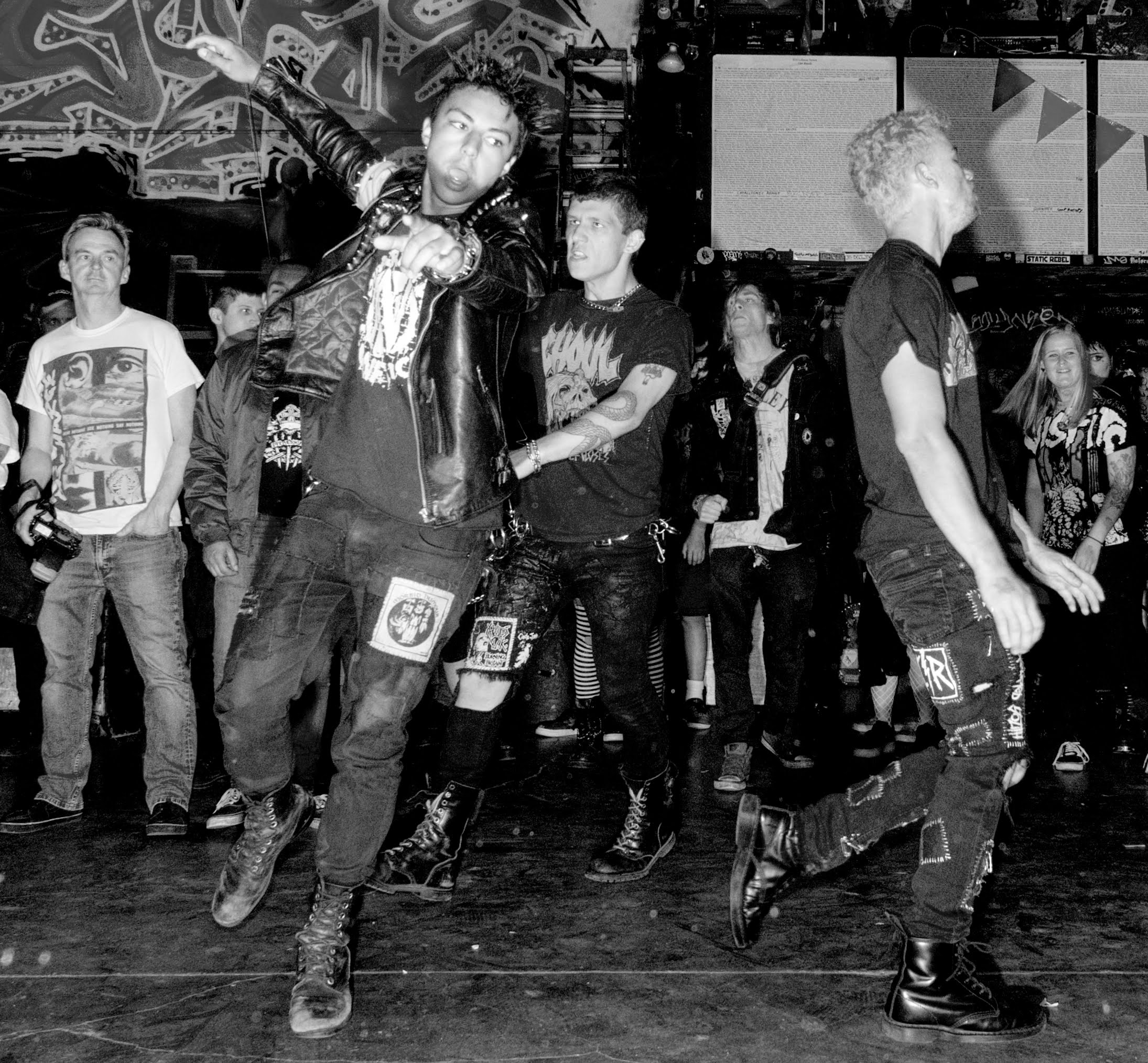
Dancing at a pre-pandemic concert by Isotope.

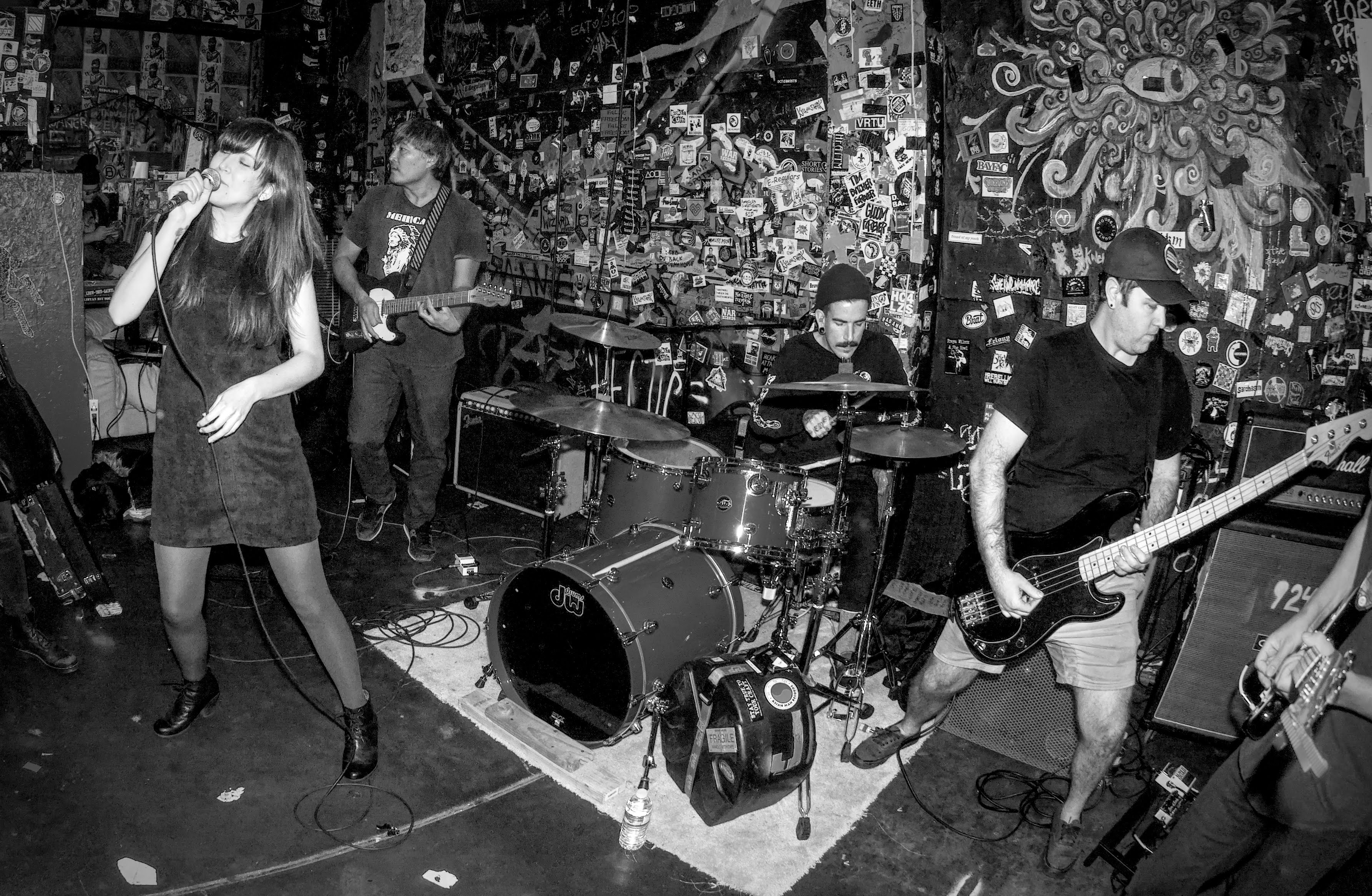
The band Kitty Kat performs 924 Gilman.

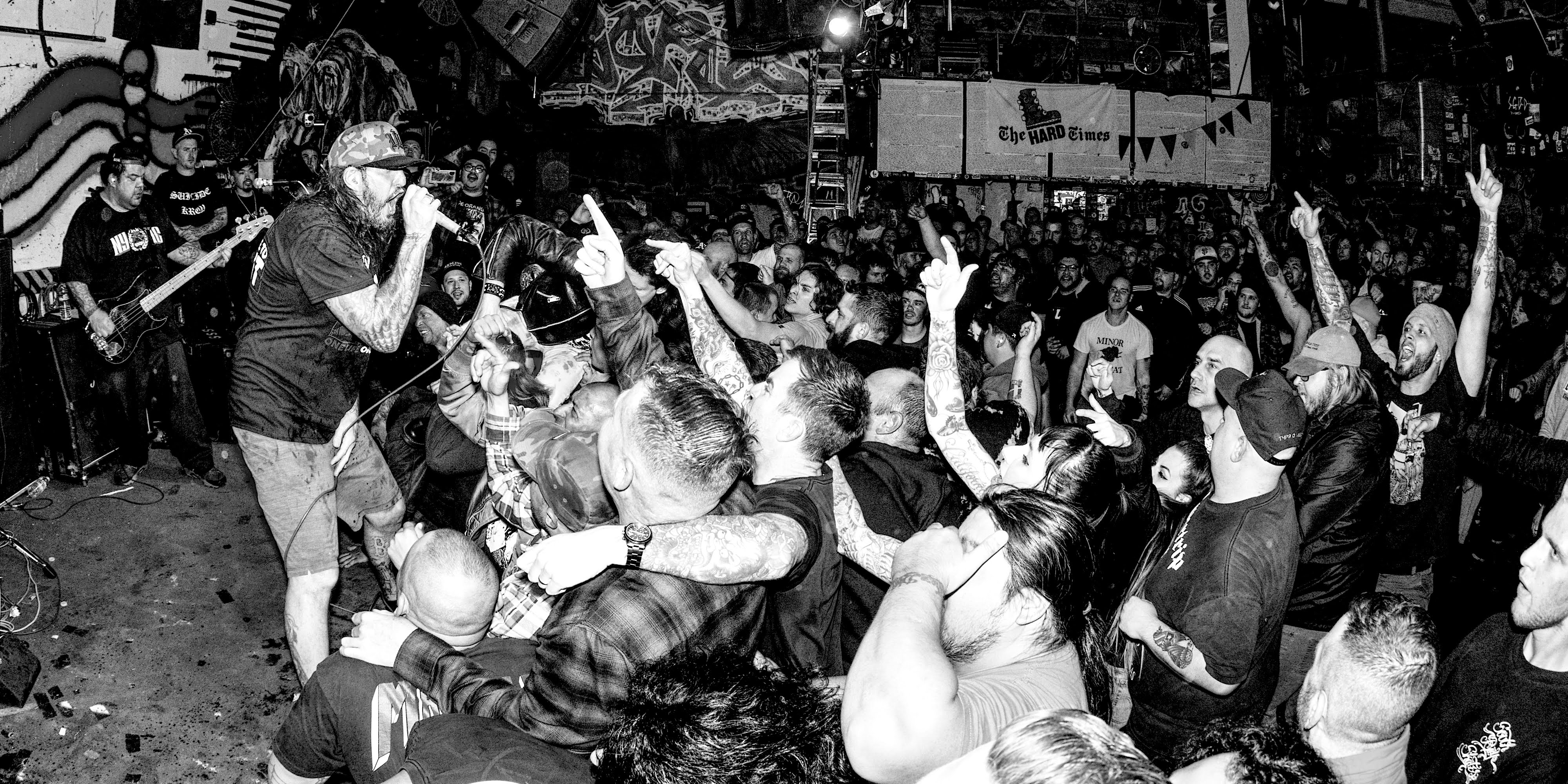
Madball performing at 924 Gilman.

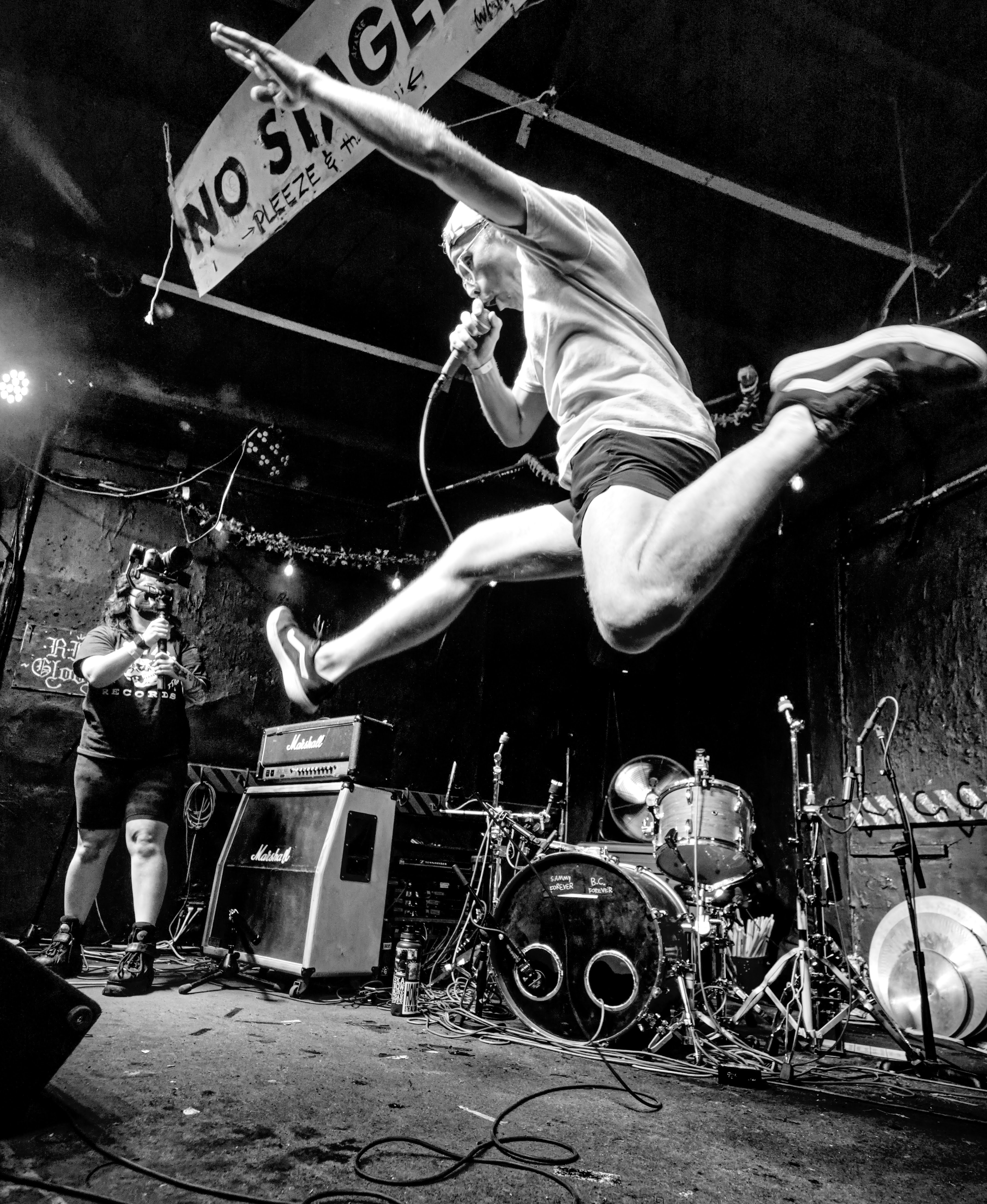
Eichlers performing at 924 Gilman.
