= Noisy Stylus =

German DJ group

Noisy Stylus
Founded	1997
Genre	Turntablism
Website	official website
Members
DJ	Tre Styles
DJ	Adlib
DJ	Tobeyer
DJ	Dynamike

Noisy Stylus is a turntablist group from Cologne, Germany. It was founded in 1997 and consists of four DJs: Adlib, Tre Styles, Tobeyer and Dynamike.

Noisy Stylus holds four national DJ Champion titles: German DMC Champion 2001, German DMC Team Champion 2002 & 2003, German International Turntablist Federation Team Champion 2004. They also hold two international titles: European International Turntablist Federation Team Champion 2004 & International Turntablist Federation Vice-World Team Champion 2004.

They have released four records, a complete album created entirely from scratching, as well as two 12"-singles, all on Beatz aus der Bude-Records. They also created various tracks for international compilations such as the Transmissions-CD on Asisphonics-Records or the late Return of the DJ Vol.V on Bomb Hip-Hop Records.

== Discography ==
=== LPs/CDs ===
- 2005 – Table Manners (BADB-R-016, BADB-CD-010)
  - Track list:
    1. Stand Back
    2. The Lesson
    3. Broccoli Wars
    4. Boom-Bah
    5. Stick 'em up
    6. Kindness
    7. Music Sucks
    8. Never Leave
    9. Spaceship Explorers
    10. Late Train
    11. Noisy Goreng
    12. Summertime
    13. Battle Mentality
    14. Surfin' Hawaii

=== Singles ===
- 2005 – "Summertime" (b/w Battle Mentality)
- 2003 – "Superstar" featuring Olli Banjo (b/w Stick 'em up)
- 2001 – "Broccoli Wars" (b/w Spaceship Explorers)

=== Battle-Tools ===
- 2004 – Snatched Breaks
- 2003 – Tobeyer's Pizza Breaks
- 2002 – Stylus Breaks
- 2001 – Noisy Breaks

=== Compilations ===
- 2006 – Olli Banjo – Sparring 2 (Im Training)
- 2006 – DJ Adlib – Adlibertine EP (Bring it to the Table)
- 2005 – Various Artists – Cuts of Culture (Summertime)
- 2005 – Various Artists – Movementality 2 (Stick 'em up)
- 2005 – DJ D-Styles – Double Homicide Split (Mr. Arrogant remix)
- 2004 – Various Artists – Return of the DJ Vol.V (Broccoli Wars)

== See also ==
- Turntablism
- Phonograph
- List of turntablists
- Hip hop music
