= Return of the DJ, Vol. 1 =

Return of the DJ, Vol. 1 is a 1995 compilation released by Bomb Hip-Hop Records. This project was the first all dj/all scratching (turntablist) album ever released. It has been re-released in 1997 with new album artwork, Return of the DJ, Vol. 1 compilation and a collection of beats for DJ's ('Peanut Butter Breaks'). Return of the DJ is known as the first all-DJ album, helping to start the careers of turntablists such as DJ Q-bert, Cut Chemist, DJ Z-Trip, and others.

== Track listing ==
1. "Death of Hip-Hop" - Kool DJ E.Q. - 3:21
2. "Ghetto on the Cut" - DJ Ghetto - 5:25
3. "Rob Get’s Busy" - Rob Swift - 4:08
4. "The Bomb Drops" - Jeep Beat Collective - 4:03
5. "Scratch Monopoly Pt. II" - Beat Junkies - 4:52
6. "Invasion of the Octopus People" - Invisibl Skratch Piklz (Q-Bert, Disk, Shortkut) - 5:02
7. "U Can Get With Discs or U Can Get With D.A.T." - DJ Z-Trip - 3:41
8. "The Chronicles (i will always love h.e.r.)" - Peanut Butter Wolf - 5:38
9. "Terrorwrist (beneath the under)" - Mix Master Mike - 5:39
10. "The Track" - ASAP Productions (Yutaka, Honda, Aladdin) - 4:43
11. "Lesson 4 : The Radio" - Cut Chemist - 5:30
12. "Suckas (sucka dj dis)" - DJ Babu - 3:06
