= Abraskadabra =

Brazilian ska punk band

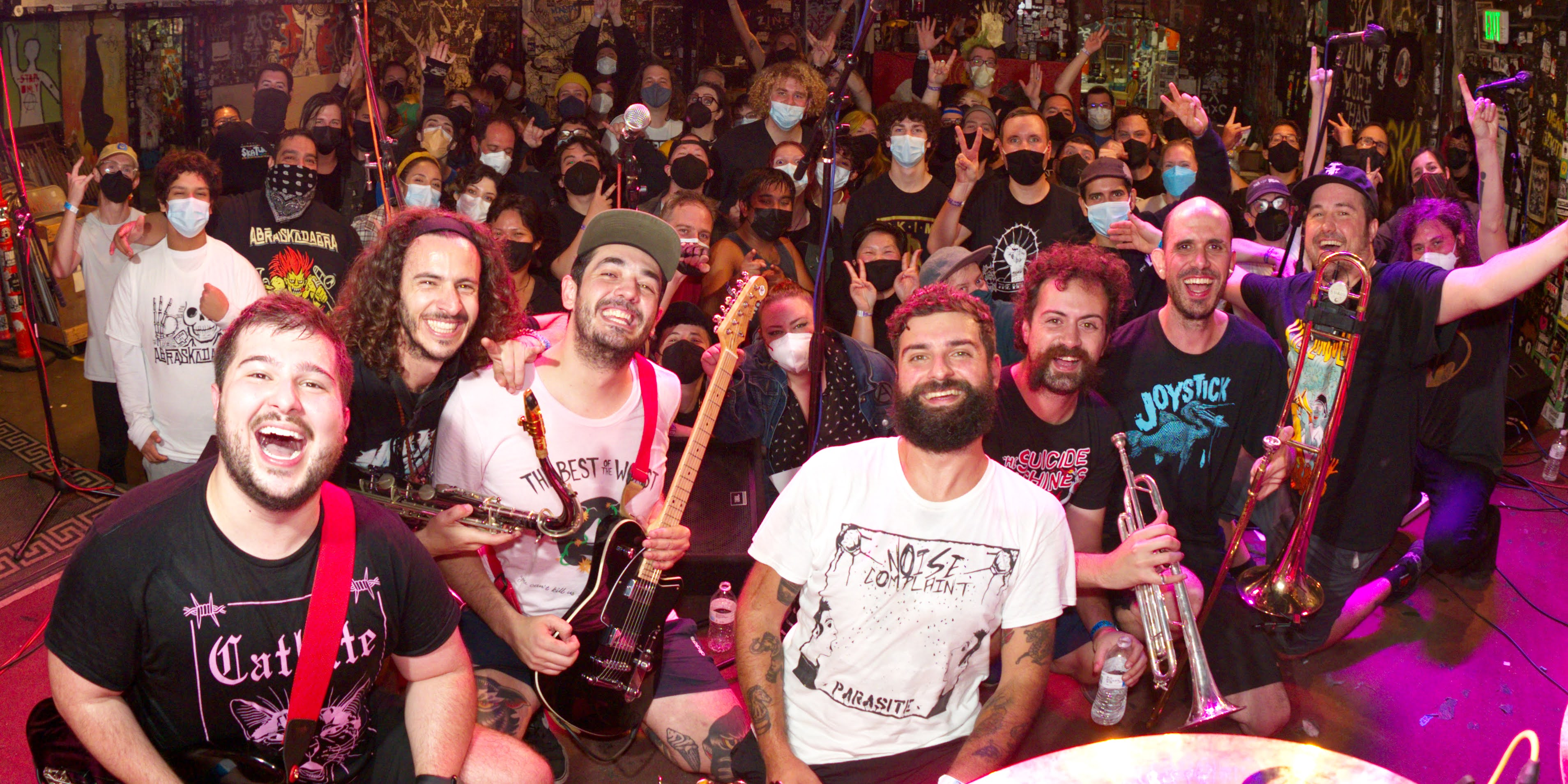
- Abraskadabra live at 924 Gilman Street in 2022

Background information
- Origin: Curitiba, Paraná, Brazil
- Genre: Ska punk
- Years active: 2003–present
- Members: Rafael "Buga" Ribas; Eduardo "Du"; Thiago "Trosso" de Sá Jorge; Rodrigo "Japa" Kawata; Eduardo "Maka" Cimbalista; João Paulo "JP" Branco; Augusto "Mamão"
- Past members: Guilherme Lepca
- Website: abraskadabra.com

Abraskadabra is a Brazilian ska punk band from Curitiba, Paraná, influenced by hardcore and by third wave ska, adding Brazilian elements to their sound, as well. The band also normally does "DIY" tours.

== History ==
=== Foundation and first album (2003–2014) ===
The band was formed in 2003 by high school friends who liked both punk and ska and wanted to play something different from what punk bands would do back then. The name was suggested by a friend and it follows a tendency observed by them in which ska bands would add the word "ska" to their names. Through a local label that also owned a store, the members could get to know bands such as NOFX, Pennywise, Bad Religion, No Fun at All, Millencolin, Goldfinger, Less Than Jake and Voodoo Glowskulls.

Guitarist and vocalist Du believes the fact that Curitiba is a cold city with much more concrete than green areas makes the band sound less "beach-ish" than other ska punk acts. The members were able to produce the different sound they were looking for after they found some brass left by the school's marching band.

After nine years, in which they released twelve songs in three different demo tapes and underwent several line-up changes, Abraskadabra released their first album, Grandma Nancy's Old School Garden, in 2012, containing songs written during these nine first years. In the following year, they released their first video, "Sing 'til the End" and, in 2014, they toured the United States for the first time.

=== Welcome and international fame (2014–2019) ===
In 2016, their cover of "Not Your Savior", by No Use for a Name, was featured on the documentary A Fat Wreck, about Fat Wreck Chords.

In December 2017, they released a video for the song "Heavy Hitters", which would later be part of their second album, Welcome. The album was released on 20 February of the following year and it was recorded in 14 days in a rented house, with all production, recording, mixing, etc. handled by the members themselves. Soon after the release, they were mentioned by then Less Than Jake member Vinnie Fiorello as one of his favorite new ska punk acts.

After Welcome's release and a second US tour, they hired a PR agency that allowed them to be covered by the international press and, consequently, they secured some other foreign tours, including one in the United Kingdom and another one in Japan.

=== Make Yourself at Home: 2020–present ===
On 24 September 2021, the band released its third studio album, Make Yourself at Home. Remotely recorded due to the limitations brought upon by the COVID-19 pandemic (a method with which they were already familiarized due to vocalist/saxophonist Thiago living in London), the album produced the single "Do We Need a Sign?".

== Members ==
- Rafael "Buga" Ribas – guitar and vocals
- Eduardo "Du" – guitar and vocals
- Thiago "Trosso" de Sá Jorge – saxophone, vocals and keyboards
- Rodrigo "Japa" Kawata – bass
- Eduardo "Maka" Cimbalista – drums
- João Paulo "JP" Branco – trumpet, vocals
- Augusto "Mamão" – trombone

=== Former member ===
- Guilherme Lepca – trombone

== Discography ==
General source:

=== Demos ===
- 2 Demos (2004/2005)

=== EPs ===
- Mago (2003)
- Destroying Your Mother on the Bed (2008)
- Fun as in Fungus (2014)
- Welcome to the B Side (2018)

=== Studio albums ===
- Grandma Nancy's Old School Garden (2012)
- Welcome (2018)
- Make Yourself at Home (2021)

=== Singles ===
- "Not Your Savior" (No Use for a Name cover) (2013)
- "Do We Need a Sign?" (2021)
