= Tim Yohannan =

Popularizer of punk rock (1945–1998)

Tim Yohannan (August 15, 1945 – April 3, 1998), also known as Tim Yo, was the founder of Maximum Rocknroll, a radio show and fanzine documenting punk subculture in San Francisco. He also helped in establishing a number of DIY collectives, such as 924 Gilman Street, Blacklist Mailorder, and the Epicenter Zone record store.

== Biography ==
Yohannan was initially a 1960s counterculture-era leftist, before shifting this ideology to the punk scene. Issue 425 of Maximumrocknroll stated, "Tim Yo was a Marxist!"

As a self-appointed "punks' herdsman", Yohannan had a reputation as being notoriously difficult.

Yohannan died at 52 on April 3, 1998, from complications from lymphatic cancer.

The band Green Day recorded the song "Platypus (I Hate You)" on their 1997 album Nimrod. The song does not directly mention Yohannan. However, frontman Billie Joe Armstrong tweeted on February 17, 2011 (and deleted the tweet a few hours later), "Platypus was written for Tim Yohanon. And I pray to god I misspelled his name. Rest in shit you fucking cunt". It is also widely believed that songs "86" and "Ha Ha You're Dead" (from Insomniac and Shenanigans respectively) are about him, although nothing is confirmed.

The NOFX song "I'm Telling Tim" from their 1997 album So Long and Thanks for All the Shoes was also about Yohannan.
