= Bomb Hip-Hop Records =

== The Magazine ==
The Bomb Hip-Hop Magazine was created by Bay Area DJ David Paul in 1991. The black & white zine focuses on all four elements (djing, mc'ing, graffiti, breakin') of the hip-hop culture on the local, national and international level. 48 zines were issued on a monthly basis for two dollars. Funken-Klein, Billy Jam, Spence Dookey, Cheo Coker, Joseph 'Jazzbo' Patel, Faisal Ahmed, Dave Tompkins, DJ Shadow, KutMasta Kurt and many others were writers for the Bomb during its existence (1991-1996). Authors who have contributed to the Bomb have advanced to major publications or have transitioned into other fields of the music industry. Filmmaker Joseph Patel, who produced Summer of Soul, noted that "The Bomb is where I learned to write." Hip-hop publications were limited, and bigger publication companies only published established hip-hop groups, so Bomb became the voice of hip-hop culture around the world.

In 1992 The Bomb issued two flexidiscs by Dan the Automator (of Dr. Octagon, Deltron, Gorillaz fame), Charizma and Peanut Butter Wolf and other artists. In 1994 Bomb Magazine released the first Bomb album titled "Bomb Hip Hop Compilation" that featured Blackalicious, Charizma and Peanut Butter Wolf, Homeliss Derilex, Mystic Journeymen, Madchild (Swollen Members), Q-bert as well as many others that the magazine had been in contact with by receiving and reviewing their demos. Bomb's first compilation was the start of something revolutionary.

== The Record Label ==
Since its humble beginnings as a hip-hop publication, Bomb Hip-Hop transformed its publicity from zines to "one of the fifteen independent labels that matter" according to Rolling Stone. Bomb's Return of the DJ series was ranked by Spin Magazine as #25 in their “The 90 Greatest Albums of the 90's”. Having been credited with the revival of the D.J. as an artist in their own right for the Return of the DJ series, featured in the movie Scratch, the label is also known for spotlighting hip-hop from around the world. Bomb Worldwide, an international rap compilation released in 1997 featured MC's from U.K., Germany, Australia, Japan, Canda and the USA (Defari, Swollen Members, J-Live, Dilated Peoples, Funky DL and many more). With a total of 77 releases to date (50 Full Length Albums, 5 EP's, 15 Singles, 4 Digital Albums, 2 Flexi Discs and one DVD), some of the artists that have appeared on releases from Bomb Hip-Hop include Blackalicious, Cut Chemist from Jurassic 5, DJ Qbert, DJ Craze, Z-Trip, Rob Swift & Roc Raida from X-Ecutioners, Noisy Stylus, Mr. Dibbs of Atmosphere, DJ Honda, DJ Format, Peanut Butter Wolf, Paul Nice and AG of D.I.T.C., Jedi Mind Tricks, Mystik Journeymen, Kid Koala and Mixmaster Mike of the Beastie Boys.

== Discography ==
- Bomb Hip Hop Compilation - Various Artists (PGA 8888, 1994)
- Return of the DJ, Vol. 1 - Various Artists (BHH2002, 1995)
- Return of the DJ, Vol. 2 - Various Artists (BHH2003, 1997)
