= Maximum Rocknroll =

Punk fanzine

- Categories: Music magazine
- Frequency: Monthly
- Founder: Tim Yohannan
- First issue: August 1982
- Final issue Number: May 2019; 432
- Country: United States
- Based in: Berkeley, California
- Language: English
- Website: maximumrocknroll.com
- ISSN: 0743-3530
- OCLC: 10553172

Maximumrocknroll, often written as Maximum Rocknroll and usually abbreviated as MRR, is a not-for-profit monthly online zine of punk subculture and radio show of punk music. Based in San Francisco, MRR focuses on punk rock and hardcore music, and primarily features artist interviews and music reviews. Op/ed columns and news roundups are regular features as well, including submissions from international contributors. By 1990, it "had become the de facto bible of the scene". MRR is considered to be one of the most important zines in punk, not only because of its wide-ranging coverage, but because it has been a consistent and influential presence in the ever-changing punk community for over three decades. From 1992 to 2011, it published a guide called Book Your Own Fuckin' Life.

Since 2019, MRR has been an online-only publication.

== History ==
=== Background ===
Maximumrocknroll originated as punk radio show on Berkeley's KPFA in 1977 but it is in its zine form that MRR exerted its greatest influence and became as close to an institution as punk ideology allows. It was founded by Tim Yohannan in 1982 as the newsprint booklet insert in Not So Quiet on the Western Front, a compilation LP released on the then-Dead Kennedys' label Alternative Tentacles. The compilation included forty-seven bands from Northern California and nearby areas.

The first issues focused on the local and regional music scenes, but the coverage soon expanded to the entire continent and, by issue five, cover stories included features on Brazilian and Dutch underground punk. In the '80s, MRR was one of the very few US fanzines that insisted on the international scope of the punk movement, and strove to cover scenes around the world. Today the zine has surpassed its 400th issue, and continues to include international content and a strong political bent. It also includes artist interviews, letters, commentary, guest columnists, and extensive sections for independent reviews of punk recordings, demos, books, films, videos, and other zines.

In 1987, MRR published a photo zine of hardcore bands, If Life Is a Bowl of Cherries, What Am I Doing in the Pit? The first regular issue devoted entirely to photography was published in 2010.

Along with the published (and later online) zine, MRR also produces a weekly radio show called MRR Radio which was played on multiple radio stations. The format of the show consists of at least one DJ playing punk rock songs for about an hour.

=== Criticism ===
The fact that MRR has become so large has not been without controversy: the zine has many critics on a number of issues. Editorial policy has sometimes been accused as narrow-minded or even elitist, causing some labels to boycott advertising in the zine or sending releases for review. The fact that punk is often considered as a movement opposed to authority and large institutions (see punk ideology) has also been an argument used to criticize the zine, which has sometimes been referred to as the "Bible of Punk".

Musicians have also spoken out against the magazine. Jello Biafra claimed the magazine's criticism of him inspired people to assault him at a 1994 performance at 924 Gilman Street, though his assailants were not known to be affiliated with MRR in any way. He also claimed that their narrow definition of punk music amounts to a new form of political correctness. According to Biafra, "If 'Holiday in Cambodia' were released today, it would be banned from Maximum Rock N'Roll for not sounding punk." Jared Swilley, bassist in Atlanta punk band Black Lips, has criticized the magazine saying in an interview with Clash that it is the "most bullshit piece of fuck garbage poor excuse for a magazine ever. They’re like: ‘Oh, we want to keep everything ‘authentic’...’ And I’m like, fuck them! Don’t use a computer, don’t use a car, don’t drink Coca-Cola. Move to a field, grow your own food."

Against Me!'s frontwoman, Laura Jane Grace, wrote in her autobiography that Maximumrocknroll had urged readers to sabotage their performances and that she quoted the article in a court case over a fight before a gig in Tallahassee to demonstrate the hostility against her.
