= Perfecting Loneliness =

Studio album by Jets to Brazil
- Released: October 15, 2002
- Genres: Folk-pop, indie rock
- Length: 67:49
- Label: Jade Tree
- Producer: J. Robbins

Jets to Brazil chronology
Four Cornered Night (2000)	Perfecting Loneliness (2002)

Perfecting Loneliness is the third and final studio album by American rock band Jets to Brazil. Vocalist/guitarist Blake Schwarzenbach spent six weeks at his mother's farm in Nova Scotia, Canada, where he worked on new material. In early 2002, the group recorded their next album with J. Robbins. The band went on a pre-release US tour in June and July, leading up to the release of Perfecting Loneliness on October 15 through independent label Jade Tree. The group had planned to promote it with a tour, however, due to an illness, the tour was delayed until mid-2003. By this point, a music video had been filmed for "Cat Heaven" and drummer Chris Daly was replaced by Matt Torrey.

== Background and production ==
After being delayed twice, Four Cornered Night saw release in September 2000 through independent label Jade Tree. It was supported with two US tours; during the latter of these, in early 2001, the group premiered new material, including the tracks "William Tell Override" and "Loose Candy". Vocalist/guitarist Blake Schwarzenbach spent six weeks at his mother's farm in Nova Scotia, Canada; his family planned to go on vacation and left him alone at the house. Due to the farm's remote nature, he spent plenty of time writing new material. Jets to Brazil embarked on a US tour in April and May 2001, which was continued with a two-week stint in Japan. They took a break over the next few months.

Following the September 11 attacks, it took the group several months to become creative again. Plans for a new album were pushed back as the band adjusted to practicing again, writing a new batch of songs in the process. In March 2002, the band announced they had planned to record their next album in the coming weeks for release in the middle of the year. It was recorded in April and May 2002 with J. Robbins.

== Composition ==
Musically, the sound of Perfecting Loneliness has been described as folk-pop and indie rock, incorporating piano melody lines and infrequent use of cello. Andrew Sacher of BrooklynVegan wrote that Schwarzenbach ""shed his punk roots in all but spirit, and was instead focused on spacious, soaring indie rock with the occasional foray into alt-country, heartland rock, and sweeping balladry". Schwarzenbach's vocals on the album have been referred to as a mix of Joey Ramone, Cracker frontman David Lowery and Teenage Fanclub frontman Norman Blake. Lyrically, it tackles the themes of despair and loneliness, against piano, softly-played guitars and scare drum patterns; though it occasionally enters into rock territory with distorted guitar lines, loud drums and heavy bass parts. The group said the record was about the search for love, God, while lacking in attempting to find these aspects. Schwarzenbach explained the search: "I think it is always worth trying to find out whether you can find what you are looking for or not ... at the end of the trip there is a new album in my case, so the search was by no means in vain." Schwarzenbach initially composed some of the tracks as folk songs, but later evolved after showing them to the band. Discussing the length, Schwarzenbach said it was awhile since their previous album, "so there was more to say".

The opening guitar riff of "The Frequency" recalled Hum, before shifting into a mix of power pop and a Built to Spill-esque instrumental. It sees Schwarzenbach's detail his hometown New York City with a bitter nature, lamenting hipsters and prolonged career paths. "You're the One I Want" was reminiscent of the work of Howard Jones and Cinerama. "Cat Heaven" was written for Schwarzenbach's cat Chinatown, who became ill and died. "Perfecting Loneliness", which lasts for over five minutes in length, combined the lyrical nature of the group's debut studio album Orange Rhyming Dictionary (1998) with the layered sound of Four Cornered Night. The final minute features radio transmissions from the Apollo 11 Moon landing; this aided in the lyrics discussing alienation and isolation. Schwarzenbach said the arabesque guitarwork was based on "Clap Hands" (1985) by Tom Waits. The song, along with the final two tracks "Disgrace" and "Rocket Boy", was written after the September 11 attacks. "Psalm" was compared to James Taylor. The energy of "Autumn Walker" and "William Tell Override" recalled the likes of Hüsker Dü and Sugar. "Further North" begins with a folk-tinged acoustic guitar part, gentle percussion and a bass part, as Schwarzenbach details his mother's farm and the topic of isolation. Schwarzenbach uses "Disgrace" as social commentary on having nothing to watch despite a multitude of television channels. The closing track "Rocket Boy" is a ballad that lasts for over nine minutes in length. It discusses loneliness, alongside humanity and the urge to fix life's problems.

== Release ==
In June and July 2002, Jets to Brazil went on a US tour, dubbed Fill in the Gaps Tour '02. They were supported by Pilot to Gunner and the Love Scene; for the stint, John Merguth joined Jets to Brazil to help perform the new songs in a live setting. On July 1, Perfecting Loneliness was announced for release in October; its track listing was revealed. Perfecting Loneliness was released on October 15 through Jade Tree. The artwork features a castle under a twilight moon; guitarist Brian Maryansky saw the image in a children's book that they found in the street. The band had intended to promote it with a US headlining tour in October and November, however, on the day of the first show, the whole tour was cancelled due to an illness in the band.

The group self-directed a music video for the track "Cat Heaven". On January 9, 2003, Schwarzenbach revealed he had spent the preceding six weeks recuperating in Canada. In the same announcement, he said drummer Chris Daly had left the group. He felt that the band had "run its course, and ceased to be fun/rewarding for me", and wanted to find a more stable profession. Matt Torrey, formerly of MK Ultra, was announced as their new drummer on March 12, 2003. Between May and July, the band toured across the US on the Throwdown 2003 tour, with support from John Vanderslice. Additional shows were added into late July, with dates in Canada.

== Reception ==
Professional ratings
Review scores
Source	Rating
AllMusic	4/5 stars
In Music We Trust	A−
Ox-Fanzine	9/10
Pitchfork	5.2/10
Rolling Stone	3/5 stars
Spin	7/10
Sputnikmusic	4/5
Stylus Magazine	F
Ultimate Guitar	8/10

Perfecting Loneliness received a mainly positive reception from music critics. Ox-Fanzine's Joachim Hiller said the record "fully met my expectations." It "lives up to its title", bordering on "pathos and kitsch." Chart Attack writer Elizabeth Chorney-Booth said Schwarzenbach's transition from "emo-punk hero to dreamy-eyed pop wuss is complete… and the results are lovely." She added that the album is filled with "swoony lyrics, bulging keyboards, unabashed melody and earnest little rock-outs." AllMusic reviewer Charles Spano noted the "deeper instrumentation, undone piano melodies, and larger-than-life orchestration", which the group used to "turn intimate observations into moments of transcendent grandeur." David Peisner of Maxim said it "does a great job splitting the difference between their two earlier releases, highlighting often gooey melodies in amongst Schwarzenbach’s tortured romantic wailings". Soundthesirens founder Billy Ho said called the album "an intricate, yet simplistic record – a perfect accompaniment to their two previous efforts", complimenting the call-backs to their first two albums. Sputnikmusic staff member Tyler Fisher said that despite the group toing the "line of bland here and there", the music is, at times, "perfectly beautiful." The album's strength relied on its "softer, slower tracks rather than the more intense" ones, though "there is a good variety of both."

CMJ New Music Monthly writer Matt Ashare said the title serves as "window dressing for a disc that takes itself pretty seriously". He felt that Schwarzenbach "achieved what he set out to do without eschewing the melodic gifts that make even his strongest medicine easy to swallow". The staff at Impact Press noted that long-term fans of the band "will melt over this release while new fans will be absorbed by the skill at which Blake can effortlessly carry a song over a variety of musical styles". Louis Miller of CMJ New Music Report said the "lushly arranged" collection saw the group crafting "stellar, yet humble songs ... that quite often develop into six and seven-minute epics." In Music We Trust co-founder Alex Steininger saw the album as the band's "swan song, a diverse, cohesive collection of songs that come from the same stem" as their previous works, "but branch off and survive on their own". Punk Planet reviewer Kyle Ryan saw the album as a big improvement over its predecessor, calling it "an amazing piece of work", adding that it "finds Jets successfully marrying Blake's roots and future. It's epic. It's ambitious".

PopMatters writer Adam Dlugacz said album "immediately addresses some of the problems that were prevalent" on Four Cornered Night, however, by the midway point, things became "absolutely inexplicable to me. Just when you think they've turned the corner, they turn into Chicago, complete with cheesy progressions that are supposed let you know how much they care." While noting the album's long length, Ultimate Guitar found the release less personal than Four Cornered Night with more obscurity in the lyrics. Despite the lack of "immediate emotional impact", it had "moments of greatness." Punknews.org staff member Scott Heisel criticized the album for "lacking in the lyrical department", "recycling themes" from Orange Rhyming Dictionary and the length of the songs. In a negative review for Pitchfork, Eric Carr wrote that it was a "sad example of a few decent arrangements being recycled and regurgitated until, by the end of the album", with nothing "left but pre-chewed, partially digested gunk." Blender reviewer Douglas Wolk was equally dismissive, saying that Schwarzenbach attempted to make "lush, emotionally revelatory pop songs with extra rock & roll oomph; what he ends up with is 67 minutes of plaintive whine, few melodies worthy of JTB’s rep, several piano ballads too many and a couple of decent rockers". Stylus Magazine's Todd Burns highlighted Schwarzenbach's lyrics as being the sole highlight on the record, though with no "audible signs of innovation or progression." He found the music "so entirely lacking"; the release failing to deliver "the one two punch of lyric and music."

== Track listing ==
1. "The Frequency" – 6:15
2. "You're the One I Want" – 4:26
3. "Cat Heaven" – 5:06
4. "Perfecting Loneliness" – 5:47
5. "Lucky Charm" – 5:59
6. "Wish List" – 4:19
7. "Psalm" – 5:16
8. "Autumn Walker" – 5:33
9. "Further North" – 5:14
10. "William Tell Override" – 3:58
11. "Disgrace" – 6:34
12. "Rocket Boy" – 9:33

== Personnel ==
Jets to Brazil

- Blake Schwarzenbach – lead vocals, mellotron, lap steel, acoustic and electric guitars
- Jeremy Chatelain – bass, backing vocals
- Chris Daly – drums, percussion, snare, cymbals
- Brian Maryansky – guitars, phaser, pedals

Production and additional musicians

- J. Robbins – recording, mixing, mellotron, sequencer
- Amy Domingues – cello
- Reuben Kaller – mix assistant
- Alan Douches – mastering
- Glenn Maryansky – visuals
