= Four Cornered Night =

Studio album by Jets to Brazil
- Released: September 11, 2000
- Recorded: March–May 2000
- Studio: Inner Ear
- Genres: Emo, post-punk
- Length: 54:04
- Label: Jade Tree

Jets to Brazil chronology
Orange Rhyming Dictionary (1998)	Four Cornered Night (2000)	Perfecting Loneliness (2002)

Four Cornered Night is the second studio album by American rock band Jets to Brazil, released on September 11, 2000, through Jade Tree. In late 1999 and early 2000, while touring in support of their debut studio album Orange Rhyming Dictionary (1998), the band debuted new material. Between March and May, they recorded at Inner Ear Studios with J. Robbins. The emo and post-punk album featured the inclusion of cello and piano instrumentation, with lyrics sung from the first-person perspective of frontman Blake Schwarzenbach.

Four Cornered Night received a favourable response from music critics, many of whom found it superior to Orange Rhyming Dictionary. It reached number 19 on the Billboard Heatseekers Albums chart, later going on to sell over 48,000 copies in the US. Three of the album's songs appeared on Jade Tree's website prior to the release of Four Cornered Night. The band supported it with two tours of the United States – one following its release, with Cave In and Shiner, and the other in early 2001, with the Love Scene – as well as a stint in Japan.

== Background and production ==
With the addition of former the Van Pelt guitarist Brian Maryansky, Orange Rhyming Dictionary was released in October 1998; multiple tours of the US, Europe and Japan followed. By April 1999, frontman Blake Schwarzenbach had stockpiled a handful of new songs that the band were in the process of fleshing out. In September 1999, the group performed at the Jade Tree/CMJ showcase in New York City, and a handful of east coast dates around this. At these shows, the group debuted new material. Schwarzenbach spent some time between his apartment in New York City and his mother's farm in Nova Scotia, Canada. He played her upright piano – a change from his Roland digital keyboard when working on songs – and viewed it as a different way of playing.

In February 2000, the group went on an east coast tour; following the stint's conclusion, the band finished working on material for their next album. They began recording it in March at Inner Ear Studios with J. Robbins, and finished in May. Robbins was "not afraid of the theatricality that the album seemed headed toward. Instead of ducking that, we kind of embraced it", according to Schwarzenbach. Robbins mixed the recordings with engineer Geoff Sanoff at Water Music; Alan Douches mastered the album at West West Side, New Jersey.

== Composition ==
Musically, the sound of Four Cornered Night has been described as a post-punk iteration of the Beach Boys' album Pet Sounds (1966), as well as emo in the vein of the Juliana Theory, with softer tracks recalling the work of Elvis Costello. The title is taken from the poem A Rabbit as King of the Ghosts by Wallace Stevens, as Schwarzenbach explained: "It’s all four of us, the room, a night, and subjects I'm always going back to". The majority of the album featured him playing a piano, which he had been using for a year and half. Schwarzenbach theorised the instrument "changed a lot … I think it ended up affecting the songs and making them a little more orchestral, or a little more involved." As a result, it is heard on four of the album's tracks; the inclusion of the instrument drew a comparison to Summerteeth (1999)-era Wilco. Accompanied by strings, piano and acoustic guitar, Four Cornered Night is a more midtempo affair, then the aggressive guitarwork of Orange Rhyming Dictionary. As Schwarzenbach had shared guitar roles with Maryansky, it allowed him to spend more time working on vocals and keyboard.

Schwarzenbach's vocals were reminiscent of Cracker frontman David Lowery, and the Psychedelic Furs frontman Richard Butler. Session musician Amy Domingues played cello on "Pale New Dawn", "In the Summer's When You Really Know", and "All Things Good and Nice". The members spent time listening to albums that were influential to them; for Schwarzenbach: Arthur (Or the Decline and Fall of the British Empire) (1969) by the Kinks. While some of Orange Rhyming Dictionary was sung in third-person, a lot of Four Cornered Night is done in first-person. Schwarzenbach explained that "felt ready, I felt a growing confidence in myself to tell my story." Schwarzenbach referred to it as a "local record", with a "failed romance" at the center of it. The majority of the songs on the album were written while he was in Canada, which contrasted to the material on Orange Rhyming Dictionary, where it was written over a period of a few years.

"You're Having the Time of My Life" incorporated arpeggios and chord progressions that recalled new wave, while its intro section evoked "Shine On You Crazy Diamond" (1975) by Pink Floyd. Schwarzenbach wrote "One Summer Last Fall" as an open letter of fans that were still clinging to Jawbreaker. The guitar pop track "Air Traffic Control" was compared to the Byrds and Fountains of Wayne. The song discusses a fear of flying, and utilizes the guitar riff heard in "Ticket to Ride" by the Beatles. "Pale New Dawn", "In the Summer's When You Really Know" and "Empty Picture Frame" were reminiscent of 52nd Street (1978)-era Billy Joel, Running on Empty (1977)-era Jackson Browne and Night Moves (1976)-era Bob Seger, respectively. "Pale New Dawn", as with "You're Having the Time of My Life", is about a failed relationship, and includes a piano part in the style of Joel. The piano-driven track "In the Summer's When You Really Know" tackles the theme of love and innocence, while "Empty Picture Frame" is about being lonely and smoking dope.

The acoustic-based mid-tempo track "Little Light", which drew comparison to Costello, discusses life while touring. ""Your X-Rays Have Just Come Back from the Lab and We Think We Know What Your Problem Is"" is initially a guitar-and-vocal only effort until the full-band comes in; its guitar parts were reminiscent of Duran Duran. The glam-lite "Milk and Apples" showcases the rock-centric side of the band's sound, with a comparison to AC/DC. "Mid-Day Anonymous" mixed the work of Pavement, a church organ, and Steve Malkmus-esque lyrics about a murder. "*******" is an acoustic track that uses biblical imagery, and is done in the vein of the Who guitarist Pete Townshend. "Orange Rhyming Dictionary" included Smithes-esque guitar effects. With its sparse piano arrangement, the closing track "All Things Good and Nice" was compared to "Mother" (1970) by John Lennon; the track sees Schwarzenbach offer couplets on his fellow band members, as well as family.

== Release and reception ==
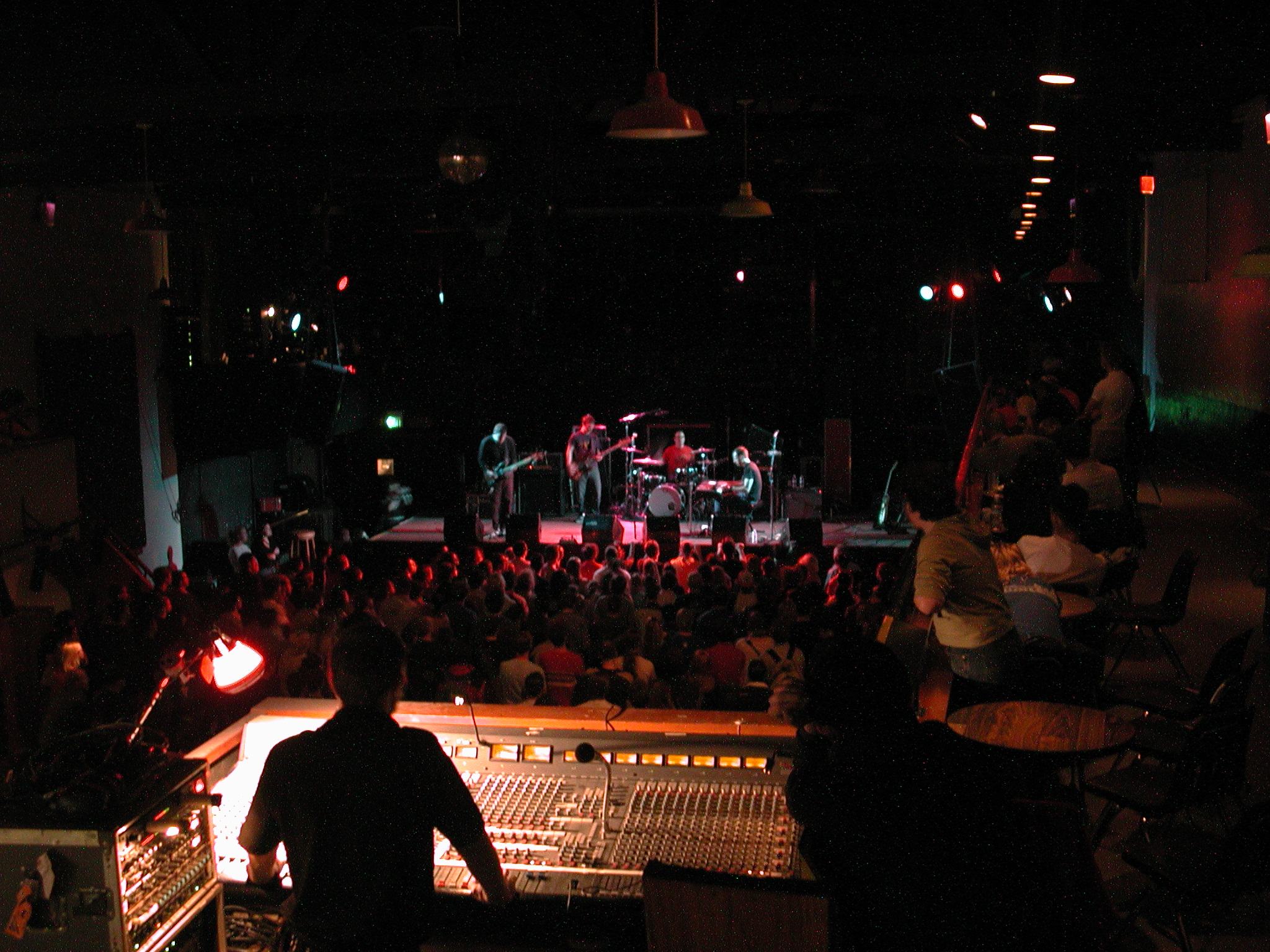
Jets to Brazil promoting Four Cornered Night live in April 2001.

=== Promotion and touring ===
In May 2000, Four Cornered Night was planned for release in three months' time; the following month, the band went on a short Midwestern and East Coast tour. On June 8, 2000, "You're Having the Time of My Life", "Pale New Dawn", and "Little Light" were posted on Jade Tree's website. In July, the album was pushed back to late August due to a manufacturing delay; and by early August, it was delayed again due to a manufacturing error. Four Cornered Night was eventually released on September 11, through Jade Tree. The CD label is designed to resemble older albums release by Decca Records. It reached number 19 on the Billboard Heatseekers Albums chart, eventually going on to sell over 48,000 copies in the US. Throughout September and October, the group toured across the US, and played a showcase for CMJ. The band were supported by Cave In, Shiner, J Majesty, Hey Mercedes and Turing Machine. Jets to Brazil spent some time recuperating, before on a US tour in April and May 2001 with the Love Scene and New End Original. Following this, they embarked on a Japanese tour in June with Robbins' band Burning Airlines.

=== Critical response ===
Professional ratings
Review scores
Source	Rating
AllMusic	3/5 stars
North County Times	C+
Nude as the News	4.5/10
The Phantom Tollbooth	4.5/5

Four Cornered Night was met with favorable reviews from music critics. Ox-Fanzine reviewer Joachim Hiller said the album was "even better than expected", calling it a "masterpiece." CMJ New Music Report's Tad Hendrickson viewed it as a "remarkable follow-up" to Orange Rhyming Dictionary, adding that it will "surprise many with its honesty and directness." Peter Buchberger of Seattle Weekly said the record "challenges the listener", leaving "no apologies" with its "sincere, piano-infused anthems that are catchy and raspy at the same time." Rolling Stone reviewer James Hunter said Schwarzenbach's emotions "adds up to extremely circular music, bold enough to drive some rock fans mad and to enthrall others." Exclaim! writer Stuart Green said that while the album was "a far cry from the aggressive" Orange Rhyming Dictionary, it ultimately beats it, "at least in terms of songwriting and cohesiveness."

Ink 19's Marcel Feldmar said it took a few more plays for the album to capture his attention "within its brilliance" than Orange Rhyming Dictionary. The minimal nature of the album "threw me off at first", though thankfully, "the intensity is still there, the voice is still there, almost breaking at times, stronger than steel at times." AllMusic reviewer Adam Bregman said Schwarzenbach "indulges in the sort of over-the-top sentimentality that is more reminiscent of a lengthy novel by Proust than anything you'd expect from a rock band." Modern Fix found the guitars not as "grating" as on Orange Rhyming Dictionary, and noted that the "tempos are slowed, and Schwarzenbach’s angst" is partially swapped for a cello and a piano. The staff at Impact Press said the a few of the songs "capture the intensity that made Jets so great," while a number of others lacked "that energy, ending up somewhat unremarkable". In a brief review for The Stranger, Kris Adams said it was a "decent, if disappointing follow-up to a good debut." Nude as the News' Mark Donohue said that Schwarzenbach is shown to be the "empty-headed lousy poet I always took him for", adding that the band "lack the sort of charismatic, essential tunesmith needed to give the band’s rude gestures transcendence".

== Track listing ==
Track listing per booklet.

1. "You're Having the Time of My Life" – 3:26
2. "One Summer Last Fall" – 5:03
3. "Air Traffic Control" – 2:45
4. "Pale New Dawn" – 4:59
5. "In the Summer's When You Really Know" – 6:17
6. "Empty Picture Frame" – 3:59
7. "Little Light" – 3:39
8. ""Your X-Rays Have Just Come Back from the Lab and We Think We Know What Your Problem Is"" – 4:18
9. "Milk and Apples" – 2:54
10. "Mid-Day Anonymous" – 4:01
11. "*******" – 1:23
12. "Orange Rhyming Dictionary" – 5:48
13. "All Things Good and Nice" – 5:32

== Personnel ==
Personnel per booklet.

Jets to Brazil

- Blake Schwarzenbach – lead vocals, piano, keys, guitar
- Jeremy Chatelain – bass, backing vocals
- Chris Daly – drums, percussion
- Brian Maryansky – guitars

Additional musicians

- Amy Domingues – cello (tracks 4, 5 and 13)

Production and design

- J. Robbins – recording, mixing
- Geoff Sanoff – mix engineer
- Alan Douches – mastering
- Russel Daniels – photographs
- Mark Dawursk – polaroid
- Andy Goldman – design
