= Orange Rhyming Dictionary =

Studio album by Jets to Brazil
- Released: October 27, 1998
- Recorded: August 1998
- Studio: Easley McCain (Memphis, Tennessee)
- Genre: Indie rock; post-hardcore; emo
- Length: 52:40
- Label: Jade Tree
- Producer: J. Robbins

Jets to Brazil chronology
Orange Rhyming Dictionary (1998)	Four Cornered Night (2000)

Orange Rhyming Dictionary is the debut studio album by American rock band Jets to Brazil, released October 27, 1998 on Jade Tree. Following the break up of Jawbreaker, frontman Blake Schwarzenbach moved to New York City, and formed Jets to Brazil with bassist Jeremy Chatelain (formerly of Handsome) and drummer Chris Daly (formerly of Texas Is the Reason). J. Robbins was drafted in to produce the band's debut album at Easley Studios in Memphis, Tennessee. With Orange Rhyming Dictionary, Schwarzenbach moved away from the punk rock sound of Jawbreaker into indie rock and post-hardcore.

Orange Rhyming Dictionary received a favourable response from music critics, with positive remarks on the lyrics and guitarwork. The Van Pelt guitarist Brian Maryansky joined Jets to Brazil prior to the release of the album. The band embarked on a tour of the United States with the Promise Ring, and then a stint in Japan. A headlining US tour occurred in early 1999, as did a trek of Europe towards the end of the year, and another US tour in early 2000. Orange Rhyming Dictionary became the best-selling album by Jade Tree, and has since appeared on popular albums lists by the likes of Louder and Treblezine.

== Background ==
During the early-to-mid 1990s, Dave Clifford of SF Weekly referred to Jawbreaker as "indie darlings" that were praised for their "headstrong resistance" against the mainstream music industry. The group signed to major label DGC Records, which brought them vitriol from their friends. Due to a lack of success from radio stations and MTV disregarding their final album Dear You in 1995, the band broke up shortly after playing their final show in May 1996. Frontman Blake Schwarzenbach briefly played drums in Moons, before moving from San Francisco to New York City. Schwarzenbach felt that the constant traveling from town to town when touring convinced him to live in New York City and find a job for some stability. He settled into an apartment in Brooklyn; that same day, Schwarzenbach met bassist/vocalist Jeremy Chatelain. He was a friend of Schwarzenbach's girlfriend, and had previously met him while living on the West Coast.

Chatelain's band Handsome was recording a major label debut at the time. The duo quickly became friends and planned to meet up later in the year; Schwarzenbach spent the next few months recording demos. With no intention of playing in a band again, Schwarzenbach spent 1997 writing for Spin, GameSpot and travel magazines, and spent some time as a receptionist for publication. Sometime after, he started playing with synthesizers and samplers, taping some songs on a TASCAM four-track recorder. Chatelain, with Handsome now broken up, heard Schwarzenbach's demos, and attempted to talk him into playing music again. Chatelain, who was aware that Texas Is the Reason had broken up, brought drummer Chris Daly in to replace the drum machine parts on Schwarzenbach's demos.

Daly's former band had ended in early 1997; he had received offers to perform with other acts, but had turned them down. He came across Chatelain, who he had known since living in Salt Lake City, in street, with the latter telling him that he was working on a project with Schwarzenbach. Chatelain mentioned that he was planning to call Daly in a week's time, but decided to invite him to join them in that moment. Daly said that while he was not that big of a fan of Jawbreaker, he liked Dear You and was a fan of Chatelain's work, deciding to accept the offer. They held a rehearsal session in mid-1997, working on "Chinatown" "Morning New Disease" and "Lemon Yellow Black", with Daly taking a tape of the proceedings home. Though he liked what they worked on, he was cautious to commit to the project. Chatelain and Schwarzenbach became aware of this; two weeks later, when Daly contacted Chatelain, the latter informed him they were working with a friend from Utah that was also living in Brooklyn. After a few months, Daly reconnected with Chatelain while seeing the Verve at Irving Plaza. Chatelain told him that his friend was not working out and asked if Daly would like to re-join them. They rehearsed several times a week, and shortly after New Years 1998, they recorded a five-song demo tape in Parsippany–Troy Hills, New Jersey.

== Production and record deal ==
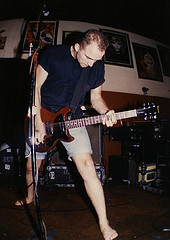
J. Robbins (pictured in 1991) produced the album and contributed some guitar parts and vocal harmonies.

The trio, now calling themselves Jets to Brazil, made their live debut in April 1998. The group's punk rock attitude, pop sensibilities and new wave aesthetic caught the attention of independent label Jade Tree. It was one of the bigger indie companies, in the vein of Epitaph and Sub Pop Records. This was in contrast from Jawbreaker going from a tiny local indie label to one of the biggest major labels. As such, Jade Tree sat in the middle between these two. Schwarzenbach freed himself from a three-album contract with DGC; he said that while that label heard the new songs he was working on, "things were so fucked up over there, they were just throwing people overboard, so [they] said fine you can go". With Lifetime's Peter Martin as Jets to Brazil's temporary second guitarist, they played shows in the US northeast, before touring across Europe with the Promise Ring for five weeks.

Orange Rhyming Dictionary was recorded at Easley McCain Recording in Memphis, Tennessee, in 12 days spread across two weeks in August 1998. It was produced by J. Robbins and engineered by Stuart Sikes. The band members wanted to record outside of New York City, and Jade Tree suggested Easley McCain, where Robbins had recently recorded the Promise Ring's Nothing Feels Good. The band, plus Robbins, stayed at an extended stay hotel during the process; they would work during the daytime at the studio and relax during the evenings. Schwarzenbach said recording out of town allowed them to "immerse ourselves in the making of this thing"; the main room at the studio "encouraged late-night experimentation as a space."

Robbins contributed some guitar lines and vocal harmonies throughout the album. According to Schwarzenbach, Robbins worked closely with him on the vocals. While Schwarzenbach favored "comping" the vocals – i.e., cobbling together the best vocal takes into one track –, Robbins "often argued for the rawer, passion over perfection take." Schwarzenbach felt that the two "found a pretty happy balance in that process."

== Composition ==
Orange Rhyming Dictionary saw a shift from the pop-punk/punk rock sound of Jawbreaker into indie rock and post-hardcore territory, utilizing sparser song arrangements and thin vocal harmonies in place of Schwarzenbach's gritty voice. Unlike previous albums he was involved with, Schwarzenbach's vocals are mixed higher; for a while he "couldn't figure out a voice that was natural for me [...] So I think I've learned how to do that". It retained the catchy choruses of pop-punk, while being backed by the post-hardcore guitar work. The album, which drew comparisons to the work of Gang of Four and Magazine, incorporated new wave influences, and dense guitarwork, styled after Ride. It explored the feelings Schwarzenbach felt while he was in Jawbreaker during his period with DGC: fear, hope and doubt. Some of the songs tackle being a white-collar worker, drug addiction and spending time in hotel rooms; sung in a third-person perspective. It also addresses sustaining artistic integrity despite commercial expectations. Schwarzenbach fondness for longer songs laid the groundwork for the album; with "Accident Prone" and "Jet Black", both from Dear You, serving as the blueprint for most of Orange Rhyming Dictionary. PopMatters contributor Brian Stout noted that "Chinatown" in particular resembled those two songs due to its length. Carly Carioli of The Boston Phoenix wrote that the album "tastefully flesh[es] out the unrestrained intimacy and emotional directness hinted at" in the Dear You song "Untitled Track".

=== Songs ===
The opening track "Crown of the Valley" begins with Schwarzenbach's Brit funk-indebted and wah-wah pedal-enhanced guitar line, which was backed by polyrhythmic drum parts. Prior to the chorus, the guitar shifts to minimalistic droning with only the drums being audible. This experimentation recalled the efforts heard on Dear You. The chorus features detuned string bending and jangling chord progressions. According to Huw Baines of Guitar, the art rock track "Morning New Disease" showcases Schwarzenbach's "meticulous style" as it "meshes with Robbins’ off-kilter framing, creating a multi-tracked latticework of guitars". The new wave number "Resistance Is Futile" incorporates a synthesizer part that was reminiscent of Gary Numan. The track sees Chatelain channelling 1970s rock-esque backing vocals. "Starry Configurations" and "Chinatown" both retread the Dear You direction of indie and emo; the latter includes a lyrical allusion to "Fireman", a track from Dear You. Schwarzenbach's vocal on "Sea Anemone" and "Sweet Avenue" was compared to the crooning of the Psychedelic Furs frontman Richard Butler. "Sea Anemone", which borders on alternative country, and "Conrad" tackled the theme of suicide. According to Schwarzenbach, a key influence on the album was the "Orientalist psychedelia" of the 1967 Bee Gees album Bee Gees' 1st.

"Lemon Yellow Black" was influenced by a biography of Albert Camus, and dealt with the French Resistance and turncoatism. Stout wrote that the song "sets the stage for a trilogy of songs that deal with addiction, depression, and medication," followed by "Conrad" and "King Medicine". "Conrad" includes a reference to a character in Ordinary People (1980) by Robert Redford. Stout said it discusses past and subsequent "suicide attempts with angels laying odds instead of intervening and parents apologizing in advance for maids finding dead bodies". The introduction to "King Medicine" features harmonic guitar parts. The song's narrator talks about witnessing a person succumbing to heroin abuse. "I Typed for Miles" was inspired by a scene in the film Barton Fink (1991), and was compared to "Heart-Shaped Box" by Nirvana. Carioli said the song tackles writer's block, with Schwarzenbach locking "himself in a hotel room and tied himself to his desk, but he can't get the words to come, eventually screaming at his muse". Arin Keeble, in his piece on Jawbreaker collected in The Routledge Companion to Music and Modern Literature (2022), wrote that the track sees the narrator preoccupy themselves with writing, something that Schwarzenbach also used in Jawbreaker's "Indictment" (1994). The album ends with the acoustic closing track "Sweet Avenue", which deals with the aftermath of a date, where one is able to process the emotions they're feeling.

== Release and touring ==
As the album was written with two guitars and a keyboard, they brought in former the Van Pelt guitarist Brian Maryansky to aid in performing the songs live. Maryansky had previously played with Daly in the early 1990s act Resurrection. In addition to this, Maryansky previously assisted in a photoshoot for Jets to Brazil. Orange Rhyming Dictionary was released on October 27, 1998. The artwork continues the aesthetic Jade Tree has for their releases, featuring black text against orange and yellow rectangles. The label's distribution methods meant that the album was stocked at stores throughout the band's subsequent tours. It was in contrast to Dear You, which suffered from DGC letting it go out-of-print. Following this, the band toured across the US with the Promise Ring, leading up to a Japanese tour the following month. A brief East Coast tour was underway in March 1999; around this time, the band performed at South by Southwest, which Schwarzenbach later called "a train wreck."

To close out March 1999, Jets to Brazil went on a West Coast tour. Following this, they went a tour of the Midwest and East Coast throughout April 1999 being supported by Euphone, Macha, and Pedro the Lion; Jets to Brazil took a month's break following this. Schwarzenbach spent the next few months visiting his uncle in Mexico and traveling on a boat ride to California. In September 1999, the group performed at the Jade Tree/CMJ showcase in New York City, with a handful of East Coast dates around this. The band had planned to return to Europe shortly after their April US tour, however, the dates were later rescheduled to November and December 1999, with support from Euphone. In February 2000, the group went on an east coast tour, with support from the Americans and a few shows with Turing Machine.

== Reception and legacy ==
Professional ratings
Review scores
Source	Rating
AllMusic	4/5 stars
Pitchfork	8.7/10

Orange Rhyming Dictionary was met with favorable reviews from music critics. AllMusic reviewer Mike DaRonco said the band "live up to their hype", noting that the majority of the tracks "clock in at an epic length." The releases "mood swings" vary from "laid-back and gloomy too upbeat and not as gloomy" (sic), while still being "all in a good sort of way". Cheryl Botchick of CMJ New Music Report said it managed a "rare accomplishment: The album actually picks up in speed, catchiness and fervor as it progresses." Ink 19 writer Andrew Chadwick found the lyrics "the same, like an old friend with a fresh heartache"; adding that this was where the similarities with Jawbreaker ended. He noted that melodic punk of Jawbreaker had been swapped for "another evolution" that is "cleaner, less aggressive", yet "still emotionally powerful." The staff at Impact Press said "emotion of Jawbreaker shines through" with Schwarzenbach's vocals and his "always brilliant song writing". Pitchfork writer Brent DiCrescenzo said Schwarzenbach was "really clever and has a penchant for penning cynical slogans"; his "lyrics have more room to breathe, and fluorescent- illuminated air becomes a fourth instrument".

Ox-Fanzine's Joachim Hiller said the record was "unlikely to disappoint anyone" who was a fan of the members' past work in their previous bands. He added that it was "hard and massive and edgy" with "loud" guitar work that was "just damn good." Clifford wrote that the record "displays [Schwarzenbach's] reluctance to revisit his former role of coaxing angst from a wall of distorted guitars." He mentioned Schwarzenbach was attempting to "remain true to himself while exploring different arteries ... which makes Orange Rhyming Dictionary something of a triumph." Washington City Paper writer Colin Bane said the record "succeeds almost solely on the strength" of Schwarzenbach's "knack for always having something interesting to say and the language at his disposal to say it." Punk Planet reviewer Dan Sinker had three points of contention: namely, the "terrible" title, Schwarzenbach's pseudo-British accent, which was "kinda strange way back" when he used it in Jawbreaker, and "[t]hirdly, and perhaps most importantly, the first song totally sucks". Rachel Phillips of Sun-Sentinel described it as the "worst album I have ever heard", with band having "nothing to offer except for 11 annoying tracks of mindless lyrics, shabby vocals and irritating background music."

Orange Rhyming Dictionary eventually became the best-selling release in Jade Tree's history. It has appeared on a best-of emo list by Louder, a best-of 1990s list by Treblezine, and influential album lists by Buddy Nielsen of Senses Fail and Vinnie Caruana of the Movielife/I Am the Avalanche. Similarly, "Chinatown" appeared on a best-of emo songs list by Vulture.

== Track listing ==
Track listing per booklet.

1. "Crown of the Valley" – 4:55
2. "Morning New Disease" – 4:16
3. "Resistance Is Futile" – 3:00
4. "Starry Configurations" – 4:03
5. "Chinatown" – 5:35
6. "Sea Anemone" – 5:20
7. "Lemon Yellow Black" – 4:02
8. "Conrad" – 4:58
9. "King Medicine" – 5:42
10. "I Typed for Miles" – 5:33
11. "Sweet Avenue" – 5:16

== Personnel ==
Personnel per booklet, except where noted.

Jets to Brazil

- Blake Schwarzenbach – guitar, vocals, strings, keys
- Jeremy Chatelain – bass, backing vocals
- Chris Daly – drums

Additional musicians

- J. Robbins – guitar, backing vocals

Production and design

- J. Robbins – producer
- Stuart Sikes – engineer
- Alan Douches – mastering
- Chrissy Piper – photography
- Jason Gnewikow – art direction, design
