= The Thorns of Life =

- Origin: Brooklyn, New York, U.S.
- Genres: Punk rock
- Years active: 2008–2009
- Members: Blake Schwarzenbach; Daniela Sea; Aaron Cometbus

The Thorns of Life were a punk rock band from Brooklyn, New York. In October 2008, Blake Schwarzenbach, formerly of Jets to Brazil and Jawbreaker, revealed that he had started writing music for an "as-yet-unnamed group" with the drummer Aaron Cometbus (formerly of Crimpshrine and Pinhead Gunpowder, among other bands) and the bass guitarist Daniela Sea, formerly of the Gr'ups (as "Dan-yella Dyslexia") and Cypher in the Snow, but best known for a recurring role on television's The L Word. The name may come from Percy Bysshe Shelley whose poem Ode to the West Wind has the line "I fall upon the thorns of life! I bleed!".

In November 2008, the group had played a couple of shows in Brooklyn with videos and reviews available online. In January 2009, they played a string of shows across California including dates in San Diego, Los Angeles, San Francisco, Oakland, Santa Rosa, Berkeley (selling out 924 Gilman Street) and ending with a final date on February 1, 2009, in Santa Cruz. Their music has been described as including some pretty raw smart-punk riffs.

Regarding the band, Schwarzenbach said, "I can say only that it's loud and tender and we're called the Thorns of Life. Whether it's more Jetsesque or Breaker-like I honestly don't know; it sounds like a storehouse of fond hatred from the last few years and in the now.

Some rumors mentioned a first album Legislators or Prophets in June 2009 but it was never recorded. In August 2009, Schwarzenbach announced that The Thorns of Life had broken up and that he had started a new band named Forgetters.

Although the band never released any studio recordings, the various bootlegs of their live performances indicate that they wrote a total of twelve songs during their formation: "My First Time", "Available", "I Hate New York", "Kryptonite", "Subway", "Vivid Green", "We Build Al Qaeda in Washington", "From a Tower", "Black Art", "Not a Track Bike", "O Deadly Death" and "Ribbonhead". The last four songs listed were carried over by Schwarzenbach to Forgetters' setlist. "O Deadly Death" and "Ribbonhead" also appear on the band's first album, Forgetters. Since 2018, Jawbreaker has been performing "Black Art" live.
