= Jets to Brazil =

American rock band

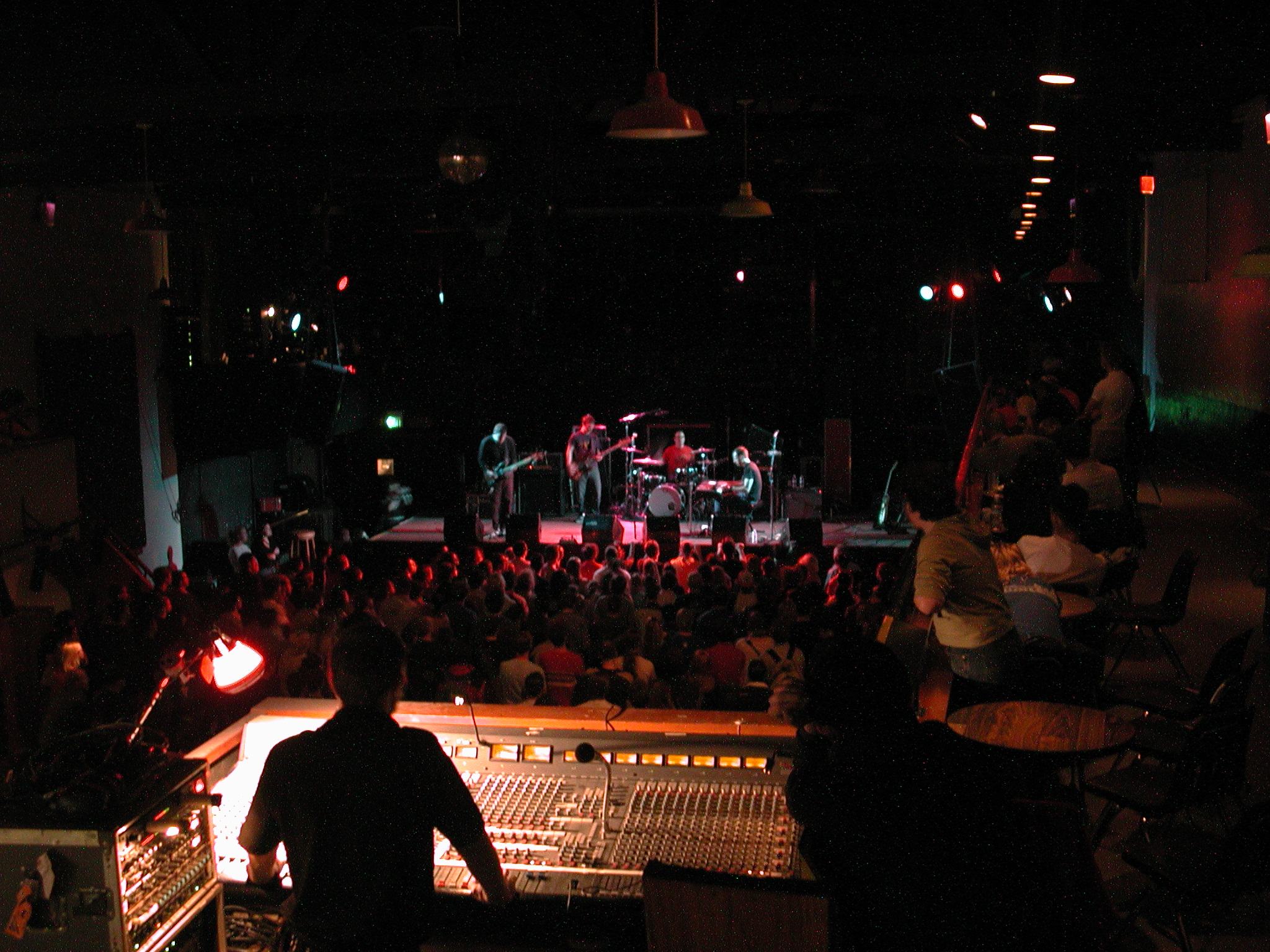

Background information
- Origin: Brooklyn, New York, U.S.
- Genres: Indie rock; emo
- Years active: 1997–2003
- Label: Jade Tree Records
- Spinoffs: The Thorns of Life, Cub Country
- Spinoff of: Jawbreaker, Handsome, Texas Is The Reason
- Past members: Blake Schwarzenbach; Jeremy Chatelain; Chris Daly; Brian Maryansky; Pete Martin

Jets to Brazil was an American indie rock band from Brooklyn, New York, US. They formed in 1997 and were active until 2003.

== History ==
After the breakup of his band Jawbreaker, Blake Schwarzenbach relocated to New York City and began recording songs at home, initially intended as a solo project. He was eventually joined by former Handsome vocalist Jeremy Chatelain on bass and the duo began working on four-track recordings aided by drum machines. Chatelain then proceeded to ask former Texas Is the Reason member Chris Daly to join the band on drums. The origin of the band's name came from a suggestion by Daly, after seeing it on a poster in the 1961 film Breakfast at Tiffany's. Though tagged by the press as an "emo-core supergroup," the band members, in Schwarzenbach's words, "all but renounced" their respective bands' music when forming Jets to Brazil.

At the time, Chatelain and Schwarzenbach were still signed to major labels (Epic and Geffen respectively). Under Schwarzenbach's deal with Geffen, the band had to present their material to the label, who decided to pass on the project. Chatelain and Schwarzenbach were then both released of their respective contracts.

The band played their first show alongside the Promise Ring and Jimmy Eat World. Indie label Jade Tree Records set up Jets to Brazil's earliest live performances. Schwarzenbach and Daly were both acquainted with founder Tim Owens and the label had previously released a Promise Ring/Texas is the Reason split EP. Jade Tree signed the band after listening to their demo. The band then went on a jaunt to Europe with the Promise Ring in the summer of 1998.

The group's first album, Orange Rhyming Dictionary, was released in 1998 to critical and commercial success, followed by extensive touring with bands like the Promise Ring. Their second album, Four Cornered Night, was released in 2000 to mainly positive reviews. Four Cornered Night was the first album to feature new guitarist Brian Maryansky, formerly of the band The Van Pelt. With Maryansky included in the band, this allowed Schwarzenbach to also become the keyboard player for the band. In 2002, Jets to Brazil released their third and final album, Perfecting Loneliness, to positive reviews.

By the fall of 2003, less than a year after the release of Perfecting Loneliness, the band broke up for unspecified reasons.

Schwarzenbach teaches English at Hunter College in New York City and is pursuing a PhD in English Literature. In October 2008, he started a new band, The Thorns of Life, but was short-lived and broke up in August 2009. Shortly afterwards, Schwarzenbach enlisted Against Me! drummer Kevin Mahon and bassist Caroline Paquita to form Forgetters who released an album and started their own record label, Too Small To Fail Records. In 2017, Schwarzenbach reunited with Jawbreaker.

Daly reunited with Texas Is The Reason for two shows at the Irving Plaza in New York City in November 2006 and a reunion tour from 2012 to 2013.

"Sweet Avenue", the final track of Orange Rhyming Dictionary, has often been attributed to Damien Rice due to misattribution on peer-to-peer networks.

On March 25, 2019, during the Q&A portion a screening of Jawbreaker's documentary Don't Break Down, Schwarzenbach answered a fan question regarding a Jets To Brazil reunion to which he answered it may happen one day but his present main focus is on Jawbreaker.

== Members ==
Final line-up

- Blake Schwarzenbach – lead vocals, guitars, piano, keyboards, mellotron (1997–2003); drum machine (1997)
- Jeremy Chatelain – bass, backing vocals (1997–2003); drum machine (1997)
- Chris Daly – drums, percussion (1997–2003)
- Brian Maryansky – guitars (1998–2003)

Former members

- Pete Martin – guitars (1997)

Studio contributors

- Amy Domingues – cello (2000, 2002)
- J. Robbins – guitars, backing vocals (1998); mellotron, sequencer (2002); Robbins was also the producer of all the band's albums.

== Discography ==
- Orange Rhyming Dictionary (1998)
- Four Cornered Night (2000)
- Perfecting Loneliness (2002)
