= Shorebirds (band) =

American punk rock band

- Origin: Olympia, Washington, United States
- Genres: Punk rock, pop punk
- Years active: 2007–2008
- Label: Rumbletowne Records
- Past members: Mattie Jo Canino; Chris Bauermeister; Keith Henderson

Shorebirds were a short-lived punk rock band from Olympia, Washington, formed in 2007 by Mattie Jo Canino, Chris Bauermeister and Keith Henderson.

== History ==
The band was formed in 2007 following the breakup of Latterman and Mattie Jo Canino's relocation to Olympia, Washington. Canino connected with Bauermeister, having moved to Olympia following the demise of Jawbreaker in the late 90s and Keith Henderson, a local drummer. Together they released a self-titled 7" inch and a split with Something's Wrong in 2007. The following year they released their only full length, It's Gonna Get Ugly via Rumbletowne Records before quietly disbanding at the end of 2008.

Canino and Bauermeister would go on to play in the short lived Mutoid Men together (not to be confused with Mutoid Man). Canino would then go on to form the acclaimed RVIVR in 2008 with Bauermeister rejoining temporarily in 2014 to record bass on their Bicker & Breathe EP. Bauermeister would eventually go on to rejoin Jawbreaker in 2017 with a highly successful reunion at Chicago's Riot Fest.

== Discography ==
Studio albums

- It's Gonna Get Ugly (2008)

EPs

- Shorebirds (2007)
- A Somethings Wrong & Shorebirds Split (2008)
