= Street Eaters =

American post-punk band

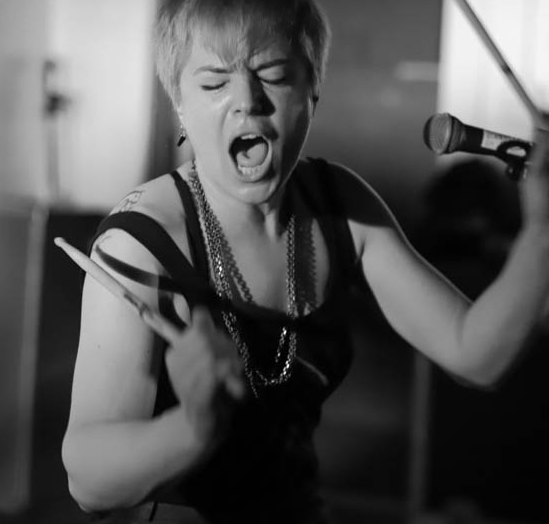
- Megan March of Street Eaters

Background information
- Origin: Berkeley, California, United States
- Genres: Punk, Post-punk, Noise Rock, Post-hardcore
- Years active: 2008–present
- Labels: Nervous Intent Records, Contraszt! Records, Dirt Cult Records, Plan-It-X Records, Bakery Outlet Records, Cut The Cord That...Records
- Members: Megan March, John No, Joan Toledo
- Website: streeteaters.com

Street Eaters are a rock band from Berkeley, California. The band's sound, which they self-title using the moniker Truewave, has been described by critics as "powerful post-punk" that is simultaneously "bombastic and sharp, channel[ing] the raw approach to rock 'n' roll once taken by 1970s and 1980s innovators such as Wipers, Gang of Four, and X...the weird era between punk and new wave" while "wrap[ping] themselves in atmosphere like Savages". Some critics have also noted the band's Post-hardcore influences, especially pronounced in recent (post-2021) material, though other reviewers characterize this aspect of the band's sound as rooted in Noise rock

Reflecting drummer/lead vocalist Megan March's background as a graduate of the avant-garde Mills College music program, Street Eaters is noted for ambitious album themes and making forays into Sonic Youth–esque sound collage soundscapes, especially on their 2017 album The Envoy (a concept album based on the Ursula K LeGuin books The Dispossessed and Left Hand of Darkness) and its 2018 instrumental companion release Inhabitations of Time.

== History ==
Megan March (ex-drummer for Younger Lovers) and John No (bassist/vocalist, singer in Fleshies) began Street Eaters as a bass-drums-vocals duo in 2008, with No utilizing an overdrive-heavy double amplifier setup for his unconventional bass playing, while March plays drums while singing in a tom-heavy, driving mid-tempo style with a heavy focus on shifting dynamics. Vocals generally have a defined lead voice, with frequent gang-style, harmonized, or synchronized vocals by the other member. While the band's early releases on St. Augustine–based label Bakery Outlet and Bloomington's Plan-It-X Records tended to switch equally between leads from March and No, more-recent albums (on the band's own Nervous Intent Records, Dirt Cult Records, and Koln-based label Contraszt!) and singles have featured March's distinctive vocals more prominently. According to Ravelin Magazine, "Drummer Megan March has one of those voices that can do anything: a Kim Gordon-like, guttural holler ("Means") Debbie Harry's snide menace, a quick shout in time with a break, a rationed, powerful scream maybe built upon agit-pop timing and dynamics."

Most of Street Eaters' current discography was recorded in the two-piece configuration, with and the duo spent much of 2009-2017 playing shows in the US, Europe, and Japan, including extended tours and residencies as direct support for bands such as Screaming Females, Jawbreaker, forgetters, and Shellshag. In 2018, Street Eaters were invited to perform four sets of their instrumental sound collage-oriented material at the Portland Art Museum for the premiere of the PBS documentary Worlds of Ursula K LeGuin.

In late 2017, during a six-week tour supporting Screaming Females, Marissa Paternoster joined Street Eaters live on guitar for nightly performances of the Gang of Four song "Love Like Anthrax", which was recorded live at The Pinhook in Durham, NC. That recording, and three other tracks recorded with Tony Molina Band's guitarist Steve Oriolo, were released as the Simple Distractions EP (2021) – Street Eaters' first recording with six-string guitar. By early 2019, Joan Toledo, an editor of Maximum Rocknroll Magazine who March and No played with in the band Difficult, had become Street Eaters' permanent guitarist; a series of new singles recorded with the trio were released in 2024. In 2025-2026, Street Eaters played with bands such as Unwound, Brainiac, Gurriers, Heavens to Betsy, Telehealth, Grrrl Gang, Edging, and Mike Watt, and embarked on US tours and festivals in support of the release of their album Opaque (on Portland/San Antonio label Dirt Cult Records) to widely positive reviews. A series of wide-ranging interviews discussed the band's past and present in Decibel Magazine NPR, and Magnet (magazine).

== Discography ==
=== Studio albums ===
- Rusty Eyes and Hydrocarbons (2011, Plan-It-X Records, Bakery Outlet Records)
- Blood::Muscles::Bones (2014, Nervous Intent Records/Contraszt! Records)
- The Envoy (2017, Nervous Intent Records/Contraszt! Records)
- Deep Cuts singles compilation (2021, Nervous Intent Records, on streaming platforms only)
- Opaque (2025, Dirt Cult Records)

=== Singles and EPs ===
- Street Eaters/White Night 7” split (2009, Small Pool Records/Repulsion Records)
- Polluted Waters split with Severance Package (2010, Dead Broke Rekerds/Dirt Cult Records/Lost Cat Records)
- We See Monsters 12” EP (2010, Bakery Outlet Records)
- Ashby+Shattuck/Mother 7” (2011, Starcleaner Records)
- Street Eaters Self-Titled 12” EP (2012, Cut The Cord That...Records)
- Street Eaters/Autonomy 7” split (2013, Off The Books Records)
- Inhabitations of Time cassette and digital-only (2019, Nervous Intent Records)
- Simple Distractions 3-song 7” EP (2021, Nervous Intent Records)

=== Compilation contributions ===
- Typical Girls Volume 1 (2016, Emotional Response/Future Perfect)
- Our Lips Are Sealed - A tribute to THE GO GO's (2013, Solidarity Recordings)
- Frequency of the Truewave Volume I (2016, Nervous Intent)
- Frequency of the Truewave Volume II (2016, Nervous Intent)
- Collapse Board: Secret Punk and Basement Pop (2011, Collapse Board)
- Total Fest 9 Sampler (2010, Wantage Records)
- Live From The Devil's Triangle Eighteen (2015, KFJC)
- By Any Means (2013, Thrillhouse/Stay Punk/Fullyintercoastal)
- Lost Tapes From The Federal Sessions (UK, 2011, Collective Zine)
- Do You Like Music? (FR, 2016, RocknRoll Masturbation)
- Dead Broke Tape Comp Four (2011, Dead Broke Rekerds)
