= Forgetters (album) =

Studio album by Forgetters
- Released: November 13, 2012
- Recorded: 2012
- Genre: Punk rock Indie rock
- Length: 51:09
- Label: Too Small to Fail
- Producer: J. Robbins

Professional ratings
Review scores
Source	Rating
Punknews.org	4.5/5 stars

Forgetters is the eponymously titled debut album of the American punk rock band Forgetters. It was released on Too Small to Fail Records, a label founded by the band, on November 13, 2012.

The album cover was painted by Blake Schwarzenbach.

== Critical reception ==
American Songwriter called the album "an intriguing lo-fi mix of [Jets to Brazil’s] pop orientation and [Thorns of Life’s] first-take rawness, with found-sound collages and surprising Gothic overtones."

== Track listing ==
1. "Strike" – 3:10
2. "Lie Artist" – 3:47
3. "I'm Not Immune" – 5:14
4. "Turn Away" – 3:47
5. "Hoop and Swan" – 4:57
6. "Die by Your Own Hand" – 6:29
7. "O Deadly Death" – 3:08
8. "Les Arrivistes" – 3:49
9. "In America" 5:51
10. "Seconds" (The Human League cover) – 4:26
11. "Ribbonhead" – 6:29

== Personnel ==
- Blake Schwarzenbach – vocals, guitar
- Kevin Mahon – drums
