= Jawbreaker (band) =

American punk rock band

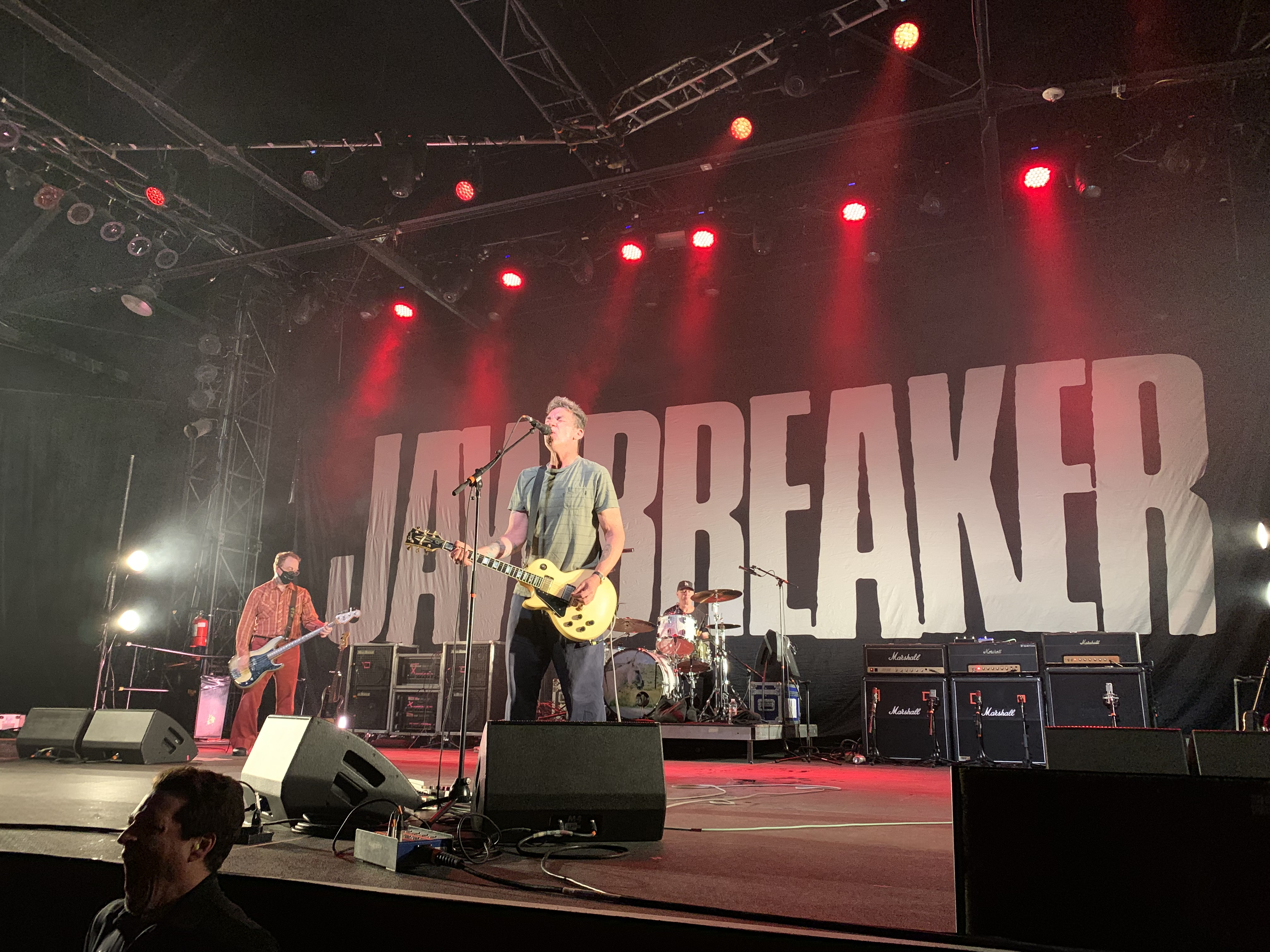
- Jawbreaker performing at Fillmore Auditorium in Denver, April 2022. Left to right: Bauermeister, Schwarzenbach, and Pfahler.

Background information
- Also known as: Rise (1986–1988)
- Origin: East Bay, California, U.S.
- Genres: Punk rock; pop-punk; emo; hardcore punk
- Works: Discography
- Years active: 1986–1990; 1991–1996; 2017–present
- Labels: Blackball Records; Shredder; Tupelo; Communion; DGC
- Spinoffs: Jets to Brazil
- Members: Blake Schwarzenbach; Adam Pfahler; Chris Bauermeister
- Website: jawbreakerband.com

Jawbreaker is an American punk rock band that was initially active from 1986 to 1996, and reunited in 2017. The band is considered to be extremely influential to the 1990s emo and punk genre with their "poetic take on hardcore." Their influence on the punk scene has led some critics to label Jawbreaker as the best punk rock band of the 1990s.

Lead vocalist and guitarist Blake Schwarzenbach, bassist Chris Bauermeister, and drummer Adam Pfahler formed the band while students at New York University, later relocating to Los Angeles where they released their debut album Unfun (1990) through independent record label Shredder Records. Relocating again to San Francisco the next year, they released 1992's Bivouac through the Tupelo Recording Company and The Communion Label.

Schwarzenbach's charismatic, frustrated, and personal lyrics helped establish him as a cult idol, even as he underwent surgery to remove painful, voice-threatening polyps from his throat. Jawbreaker toured with Nirvana in 1993 and released 24 Hour Revenge Therapy in 1994, attracting the attention of major labels. They signed a $1 million contract with DGC Records and released 1995's Dear You, but its more polished production and smooth vocals caused significant backlash from the band's core audience. Internal tensions led to Jawbreaker's dissolution in 1996 and Schwarzenbach had repeatedly stated that a reunion would never happen. However, the band announced a reunion in April 2017, and they are currently in the process of making the follow-up to Dear You.

Following the breakup, the members of Jawbreaker were active in other projects including Jets to Brazil and Whysall Lane. Pfahler continued to issue previously recorded Jawbreaker material through his Blackball Records label, and public interest in the band continued due in part to nationally charting pop-punk and emo acts openly indebted to Jawbreaker's sound. In 2004, Pfahler licensed the out-of-print Dear You from DGC's parent company Geffen Records and re-released it to positive reviews. Remastered versions of the rest of the band's catalog have since been released.

== History ==
Promotional photo of the band in San Francisco's Mission District neighborhood, 1992

=== 1986–1990: Formation and Unfun ===
Prior to forming Jawbreaker, Blake Schwarzenbach and Adam Pfahler were childhood friends in Santa Monica, California and classmates at Crossroads High School. In 1986 they moved to New York City to attend New York University and decided to start a band. Seeking a bassist, they responded to a flyer posted on campus by Chris Bauermeister. "It wasn't just this Xeroxed thing", Pfahler later recalled, "It was something he had drawn, like a poster. It was all colored and it named all the right bands." The trio began practicing together at Giant Studios on Sixth Avenue, with Schwarzenbach on guitar and Pfahler on drums. "It was just us, trying to figure each other out in that hourly room for a while", recalls Schwarzenbach, "We went through a lot of incarnations before we sounded anything like the band we became. I am glad we didn't play live [very much then], because I had to go through my hardcore phase." They practiced with several singers and went through several names during this time, eventually settling on the name Rise.

In the fall of 1987 Schwarzenbach, Pfahler, and Bauermeister took time off from college and moved to Los Angeles to pursue Rise, adding Bauermeister's childhood friend Jon Liu on lead vocals. This changed, however, when Schwarzenbach wrote and sang "Shield Your Eyes" for the band's demo. It was the first recording on which he sang, and he later noted that it "kind of defined where we would go as a band". According to Liu, "That was the song where everything worked. The vocal arrangements. The lyrics. It was a perfect piece. But to my detriment, I kind of bristled against it. I was like, 'This is amazing, and I don't think I can do anything like this.'" The band soon changed their name to Jawbreaker and Schwarzenbach, Pfahler, and Bauermeister decided to continue as a trio with Schwarzenbach on vocals. Bauermeister was given the task of informing Liu that he was no longer in the band, which proved awkward since the two were roommates. "I am cool with it now," reflected Liu in 2010, "It was to everybody's benefit. But at the time, there was some bitterness."

"Shield Your Eyes" was the first Jawbreaker song to be released, on the 7" vinyl compilation album The World's in Shreds Volume Two on independent record label Shredder Records. This was followed by a single for the song "Busy" and the Whack & Blite 7" E.P. in 1989. In total Jawbreaker wrote almost 20 songs in 1988 and 1989, many of which appeared on compilations and split singles over the next two years. The band played their first show March 16, 1989 at Club 88 in Los Angeles and recorded their debut album, Unfun, in two days in Venice in January 1990. Released through Shredder, its pop-punk sound was distinguished by Schwarzenbach's lyrical and vocal intensity.

We were beat to shit. We broke up at the end of the tour because, well, why wouldn't we? We were driving around in Chris' van, with a pleather couch sliding around in the back, with no air conditioner in the summer. By the end, we were pretty much at each other's throats. So it was like, "Fuck this, let's call it quits. This is insane."

— Pfahler on the band's breakup following the "Fuck 90" tour

In the summer of 1990 Jawbreaker embarked on the "Fuck 90" tour with Econochrist, which proved to be a grueling experience that briefly broke up the band. "It was roughly two months, in the summer, for a totally unknown band", according to Schwarzenbach. "Of that tour, we probably had six rad shows. Then there were maybe 25 utterly forgettable metal-club-in-Florida-type shows." Bauermeister stopped speaking to Pfahler and Schwarzenbach when the tour reached Canada, with several weeks still to go. By the conclusion of the tour, tensions between the members had risen to the point where they announced the band's breakup. Schwarzenbach and Bauermeister returned to New York University to finish their degrees, and rarely spoke to each other.

=== 1991–1992: Relocation and Bivouac ===
Pfahler quickly regretted the breakup, while Schwarzenbach and Bauermeister eventually reconciled in New York. The trio decided to continue with Jawbreaker and relocate to San Francisco, where they had already earned the recognition of local acts Econochrist and Samiam. In 1991 they moved into an apartment complex in the Mission District; Pfahler and Schwarzenbach shared an apartment across the hall from Bauermeister, J Church's Lance Hahn and roadie Raul Reyes. They recorded their second album, Bivouac, with recording engineer Billy Anderson, and it was released in 1992 through the local labels Tupelo Recording Company and The Communion Label. Pfahler has described the album as "varied and ambitious", noting that it "took ages to finish" and "I think we were trying to prove something with that record. We were definitely stretching out."

By the time of Bivouac's release Schwarzenbach had developed a polyp on his throat, causing him to lose his voice onstage. As the band drove across the United States to fly from New York City to begin a European tour, he began to suffer serious vocal problems. Though the condition caused him great pain while singing, threatened his voice, and was potentially fatal should the polyp burst or lodge in his throat, the band decided to do the European tour anyway. "That period seemed really arduous for me because I was so physically challenged by singing", recalls Schwarzenbach, "Every day was full of dread, having to stand up there and see what would happen. But it was too late. We had to play or else we would have bankrupted our friends." By the time the band reached Ireland, Schwarzenbach's condition had worsened and the tour was put on hold while he had surgery to remove the polyp. The tour resumed a week later. In August 1992, Jawbreaker was noticed by the magazine Spin when the magazine published a story called "California Screamin'", which documented the East Bay punk scene.

=== 1993–1994: 24 Hour Revenge Therapy and signing to DGC ===
Upon returning to San Francisco, Pfahler and Schwarzenbach were homeless and slept in the band's touring van for a brief period. They soon found new residences, with Schwarzenbach moving to nearby Oakland where he began writing lyrics for the band's third album, 24 Hour Revenge Therapy. Jawbreaker travelled to Chicago in May 1993 and recorded the bulk of the album with engineer Steve Albini, though the album's production is officially credited on liner notes and packaging to Fluss, Albini's cat. They recorded three additional tracks with Billy Anderson in San Francisco that August, and the album was released in early 1994 through Tupelo/Communion. Music journalist Andy Greenwald and Alternative Press' Trevor Kelley both cite it as the album most beloved by the band's fans. "24 Hour Revenge Therapy is arguably Jawbreaker's best album," writes Greenwald, "but it is also far and away its most loved, the best example of Schwarzenbach's innate ability to marry the boozy, bluesy regretfulness of the Replacements with the loose, seat-of-the-pants attitude of Gilman Street punk." As dubbed copies of the album began to circulate in late summer 1993, the band began to earn a devoted fanbase.

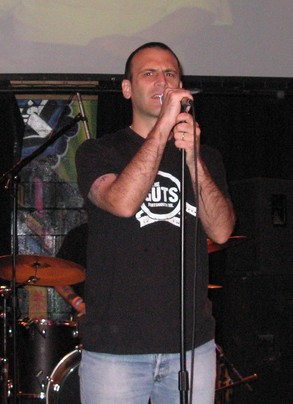
Ben Weasel was among the figures in the punk rock community openly critical of Jawbreaker's signing to DGC.

In October 1993, prior to 24 Hour Revenge Therapy's release, Jawbreaker were asked to open for Nirvana on six dates of their In Utero tour. Fans bristled against this, wary that it would result in Jawbreaker—a beloved independent band—signing to major label DGC Records, whom Nirvana were contracted to. "I think we were fortunate [with 24 Hour Revenge Therapy]", recalls Schwarzenbach, "But we still got some flack. Even at that point, there were people who didn't think we were especially punk-rock, as some people practiced it. I don't think there was any major pushback, though, until we did the Nirvana tour. That's officially when it started." According to Pfahler: "People really came down on us for going on tour with Nirvana. They really saw it as, 'Okay, here we go. This is the first step. The next thing that happens is that someone from the label sees them and they get snapped up.' Which is kind of what happened."

Following the release of 24 Hour Revenge Therapy in February 1994, Jawbreaker received contract offers from major record labels. Though they had already decided to break up following the album's supporting tours due to tiredness and frustration, the band decided to consider the offers, partly due to the major label successes of their peers Green Day and Jawbox. They met with a number of labels over the course of the year, narrowing their options to Warner Bros. Records, Capitol Records, and DGC. Rumors spread throughout the Bay Area suggesting Jawbreaker had signed to major label, and in a 1994 concert where Green Day's Billie Joe Armstrong was among the audience, Schwarzenbach confronted the major label gossip, confirming the approaches by representatives but promised to never sell out. Nonetheless, the band signed to DGC in a one million-dollar deal, due in part to the relationship they had developed with A&R representative Mark Kates who they had met on the Nirvana tour. Fans and key figures in the punk rock community were quick to denounce the band for the move. In an interview for Ben Weasel's Panic Button zine following the Nirvana tour, Schwarzenbach had stated flatly that Jawbreaker was not interested in signing to a major record label. In response to the signing, Weasel took the band to task in a column for Maximumrocknroll accompanied by a photo depicting him eating his own hat, which he had promised to do if the band ever signed to a major.

=== 1995–1996: Dear You and breakup ===
Jawbreaker began recording their major-label debut, Dear You, in February 1995 at Fantasy Studios in Berkeley, California with Rob Cavallo, who had produced Green Day's breakthrough album Dookie the previous year. Recording sessions lasted two months and resulted in disenchantment and tension within the band, particularly between Bauermeister and Schwarzenbach. After a week of recording drums and bass guitar, Bauermeister and Pfahler were largely absent from the rest of the sessions while Schwarzenbach continued to work on the album with Cavallo. "I didn't even go", recalled Bauermeister in 2010, "I just hung out at home with my wife. I was already trying to separate myself from the band, while Blake became more of the major force." With a large recording budget at their disposal, Schwarzenbach and Cavallo spent much of their time polishing the record's production value, making the vocals and guitar clear and bringing them to the forefront of the mix. According to Cavallo, "Blake really wanted to be heard. I think he wanted his voice to be heard for the first time. He also decided to sing differently. Then, to me, I thought those songs could benefit from some precision."

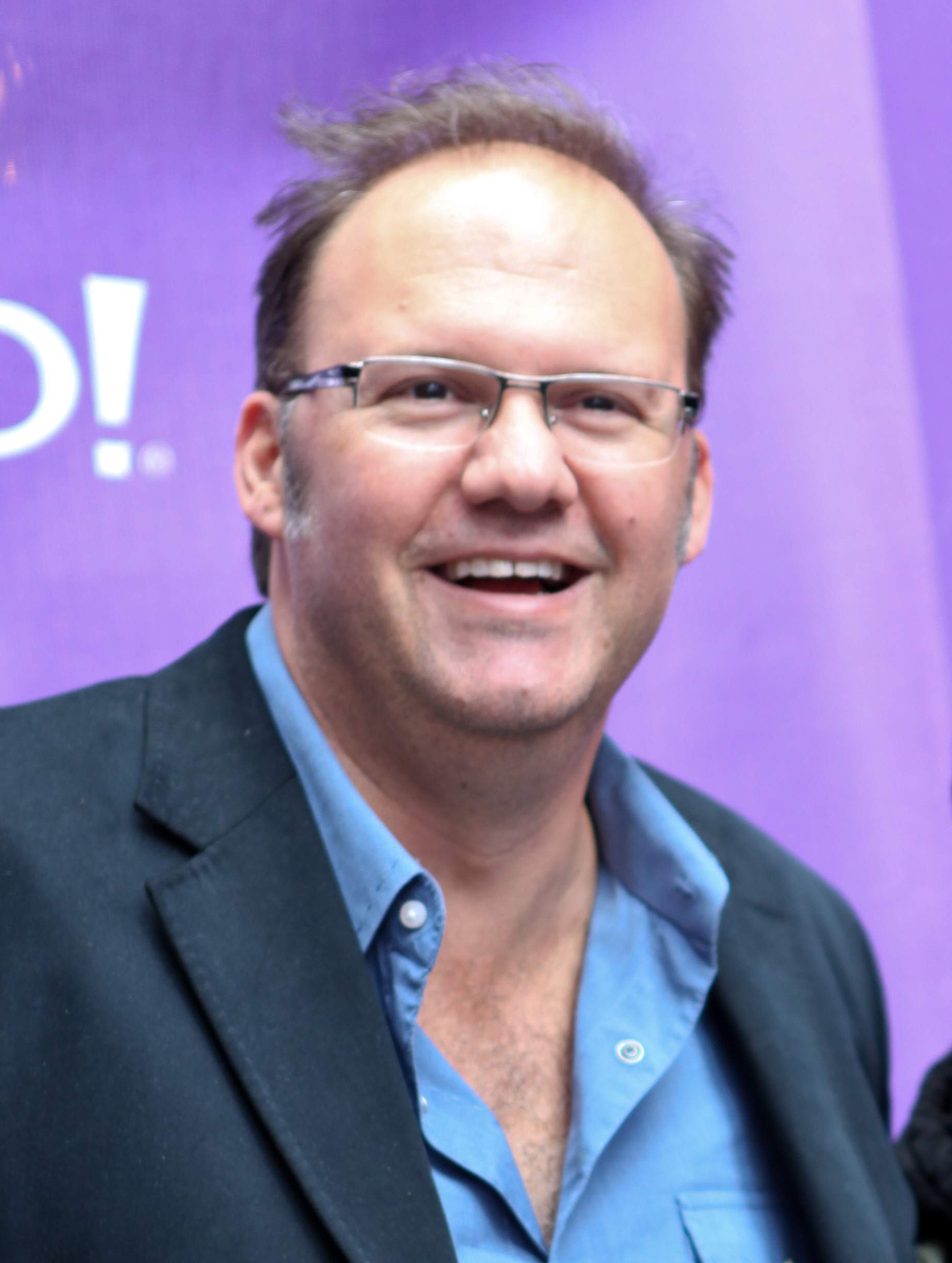
Producer Rob Cavallo gave Dear You very polished production value in comparison to Jawbreaker's previous albums.

In the months leading up to the album's release, a number of music publications positioned Jawbreaker as the next stars of the Bay Area punk scene, sometimes referring to them as "the thinking man's Green Day". When Dear You was released in September 1995, however, its polished production and clear vocals strongly divided the band's fanbase. "[Dear You]'s production glistened and gleamed," says Greenwald, "Schwarzenbach's voice was sanded and smoothed, and the songs were mellow, introspective affairs. The reaction was harsh—those who had entrusted their emotional lives to Schwarzenbach, had viewed him as a tattered, secular priest to lay their burdens on, felt betrayed." Ben Weasel was so displeased with the album, particularly the sound of Schwarzenbach's singing, that he wrote Pfahler a letter detailing his complaints with it. Despite a music video in rotation to support the single "Fireman," sales of Dear You were poor, and only sold 40,000 copies in the US.

As the band toured in support of the album, audience reaction toward the new material was either lukewarm or outright negative. "I have never seen anything like that—before or since", said Kates, "There was a point where they were headlining the Roxy and there were kids sitting on the floor, with their backs to the stage, when they were playing songs from Dear You. I'm not making that up. If you were to try to explain that to somebody now, it would make no sense." Jawbreaker continued touring in 1996, opening for the Foo Fighters that spring, but audience reception did not improve. Samiam's Sergie Loobkoff cites a show at The Warfield in San Francisco as a turning point: "That is when I knew they were definitely going to break up. It was their hometown; they had put out the big major-label record. But then you're looking around and it was like no one cared."

Attitudes between the band members continued to sour, particularly between Bauermeister and Schwarzenbach, who took to traveling in separate vans. Tensions came to a head in Salem, Oregon, culminating in a fistfight between the two which spilled out of the van and onto the sidewalk. "I remember just calling Blake a 'fucking prima donna' and a 'stupid son of a bitch who thinks it's all about him.' Just letting it all out", says Bauermeister, "It definitely put a wedge between us." On returning to San Francisco, the band called a meeting and decided to break up, though Pfahler was resistant to the idea. Jawbreaker officially announced their breakup on July 4, 1996.

=== 1997–2016: Post-Jawbreaker projects ===
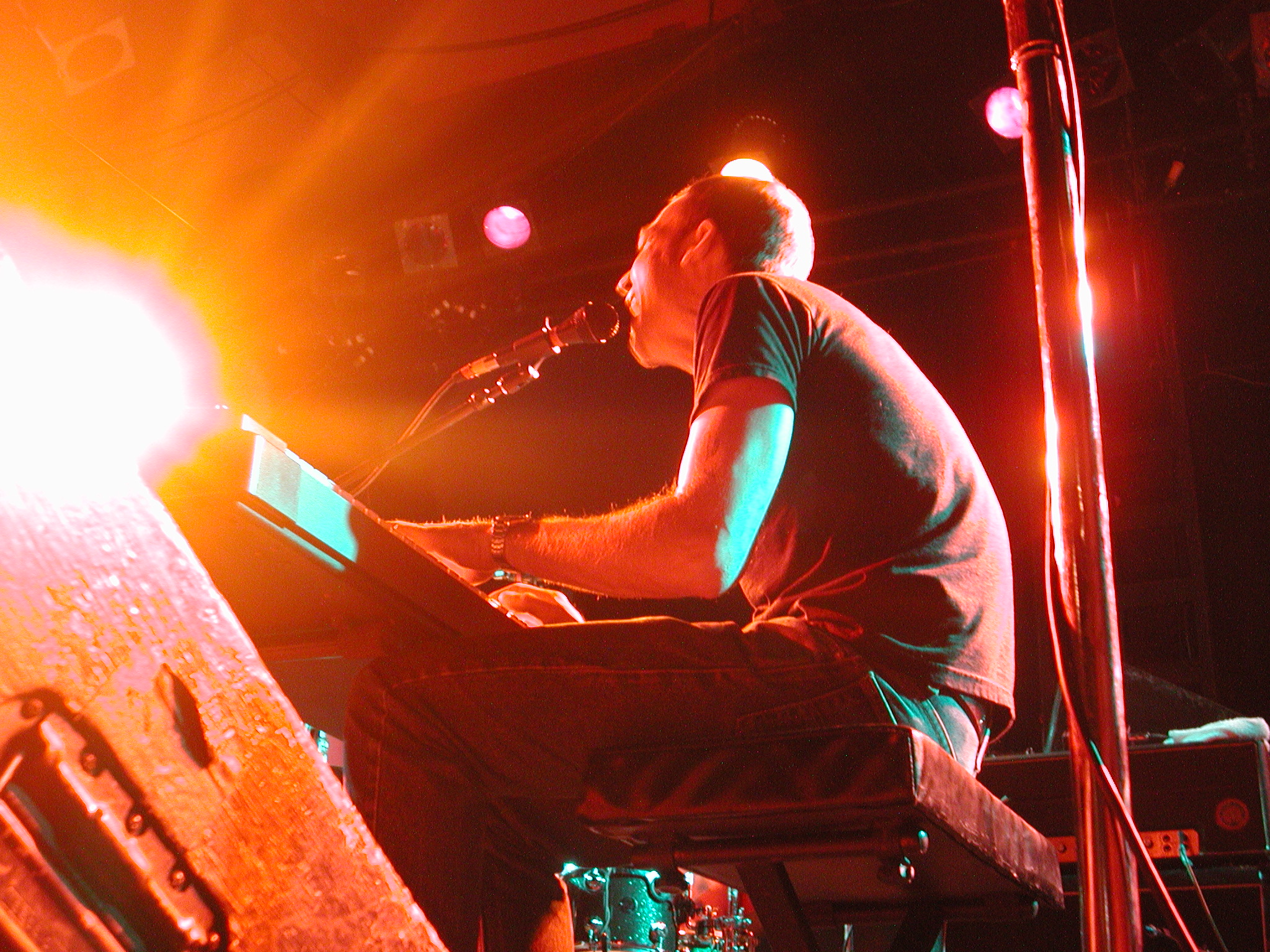
Schwarzenbach in 2001 with his post-Jawbreaker act Jets to Brazil.

Following the band's breakup, Schwarzenbach moved to Brooklyn where he DJ'd and wrote freelance video game reviews for websites. He formed and fronted Jets to Brazil from 1997 to 2003, combining Britpop influences, piano ballads, and stark lyrics. Fans and critics, however, still associated him primarily with Jawbreaker and did not warm to his new project: "Schwarzenbach was so adored for what he had done that few were willing to allow him to gracefully move on", writes Greenwald, "Jets to Brazil, though popular, has received unspeakably scathing reviews, boiling with the bitterness usually reserved for a cheating lover."

Bauermeister, meanwhile, returned to his job at the toy store he had worked at before Jawbreaker had begun touring. "I had been on tour, playing in front of thousands of people", he later remarked, "And here I was, working as a toy shop clerk. I was devastated." He eventually returned to music, joining the Chicago pop-punk band Horace Pinker from 1999 to 2001, performing on their 2000 EP Copper Regret before forming the short-lived Shorebirds and Mutoid Men with Mattie Jo Canino, formerly of Latterman. Bauermeister additionally recorded bass on RVIVR's 2014 EP Bicker & Breathe, a band also fronted by Canino.

Pfahler remained in San Francisco's Mission District, where he opened the Lost Weekend Video store with Jawbreaker's tour manager Christy Colcord. He played in J Church with Bauermeister's old roommate Lance Hahn from 1998 to 2002, then in Whysall Lane until 2006. He continued to release Jawbreaker material through his Blackball Records label, issuing the live album Live 4/30/96 in 1999 and the compilation album Etc. in 2002. In 2004 he licensed the publishing rights to Dear You—which had become an out-of-print collector's item, often selling for more than twice its retail price on online auction sites—from DGC's parent company Geffen Records, and re-released it to positive critical response.

In August 2007 filmmakers Keith Schieron and Tim Irwin began work on a documentary film about Jawbreaker, having previously made the 2005 Minutemen documentary We Jam Econo. All three band members were convinced to take part in the film and met at a San Francisco studio, the first time they had all met together in eleven years. "A couple years ago, I began to have a really nice time with the memory of Jawbreaker," said Schwarzenbach, "I just thought, 'That's good, people finally get it.' It was nice. So I was happy with the idea. I wanted to do it." Bauermeister was unsure about seeing Schwarzenbach again, but stated that "there was a moment when I realized that my resentment was not so much through Blake, but what he had come to represent in my mind. So I told him." The filmmakers had the necessary instruments and equipment set up in the studio and invited the band to play, which they did, performing "Bivouac", "Condition Oakland", and "Parabola". The performance was photographed, and an audio recording was made through the sound board, but the band chose not to film the session "out of both respect for the sanctity of the moment and fear that we'd suck." In February 2011 Schieron and Irwin shot footage in Los Angeles, including interviews with Jon Liu and the band's former tour manager Anthony "Nino" Newman. There was talk of reuniting the band with Dear You producer Rob Cavallo, but this did not take place. Bauermeister and Schwarzenbach did not speak again for some time after the filming in San Francisco. Pfahler mentioned in a May 2015 update on the band's official Twitter account that he had "just met with Keith Schieron about the Jawbreaker documentary. We're interviewing editors to take it from here."

Schwarzenbach spent time teaching English at Hunter College in New York City and briefly fronted The Thorns of Life from 2008 to 2009. He currently plays in the band Forgetters. Bauermeister lives in Olympia, Washington and performs in the Mutoid Men. Pfahler still resides in San Francisco, where he continues to run Lost Weekend Video and reissue Jawbreaker material through Blackball Records; in 2010 he released a remastered version of Unfun, and plans to remaster and re-release Bivouac and 24 Hour Revenge Therapy over the next few years.

I have said this many times before: I physically don't feel capable of doing it. I don't think I could sing those songs and I think it would be a disservice to the memory of the band to try to do that. I don't gloat about being in that position, either. It's not like, "Oh, I get to take the moral high ground." In fact, I'm sad about that.

— Schwarzenbach on the possibility of a Jawbreaker reunion

Rumors persisted of a Jawbreaker reunion, but they had been continually dispelled by the band members. Pfahler said that he "would do it in a heartbeat", while Bauermeister had agreed that "Adam and I would do it at the drop of a hat. But I don't think Blake is anywhere near [ready]." For his part, Schwarzenbach had expressed that he did not feel physically capable of singing the songs and doing them justice: "If I felt I was in a good enough place, I think we could have a really fun and successful tour. We could also pay a lot of bills, which would be profoundly helpful. But it's always the same story. Something is fucking broken in me so that when it's like, 'A lot of people want to hear you,' I just think, 'Well, I don't want to do that.'"

=== 2017–present: Reunion and possible fifth studio album ===
On April 19, 2017, it was announced that Jawbreaker would reunite as the headliner of the final night of Riot Fest in September 2017. Although the Riot Fest appearance was initially announced as a one-off reunion show, Jawbreaker performed together for the first time in 21 years at the Ivy Room in Albany on August 3, 2017, opening for Monsula; this was held as a private gig and mostly attended by friends of the band. They played their second reunion show at The Rickshaw Stop in San Francisco on August 12, 2017. On November 28, 2017, Jawbreaker performed their first post-Riot Fest show at the Olympia Film Society to benefit the Thurston County Food Bank.

Jawbreaker reuniting at Riot Fest 2017

Coinciding with the band's reunion, the long-in the works documentary Don't Break Down: A Film About Jawbreaker was premiered on August 11, 2017 in San Francisco, and screened at Nitehawk Cinema in New York City on August 31. On the night of the documentary's screening, frontman Blake Schwarzenbach participated in a Q&A session, where he hinted at more shows and added that there was "95% chance of a New York show." He explained, "If we aren't burned alive in Chicago, we wanna do more, and not have to have people make it a destination and pay a ton of money to see us." Schwarzenbach also stated that Jawbreaker was "trying to" write new material. Also coinciding with the reunion, Jawbreaker's first demo from 1989 was remastered and remixed, and re-released on their Bandcamp page.

On January 9, 2018, the band announced a series of sold-out shows. In January, the band played two shows in San Francisco, three shows at Brooklyn Steel in February (making it their first shows in New York in 25 years), and in March, two shows at the Hollywood Palladium (their first shows in Los Angeles in 22 years). They performed in Austin, Texas with Lemuria and A Giant Dog in July. The band played a 2 night residency in Portland, Oregon at the Crystal Ballroom with Swearin' and 3 nights in their native San Francisco at The Fillmore with Street Eaters and Dirty Denim in August and October respectively. On November 4, the band played a sold out show at the Aragon Ballroom in Chicago with Naked Raygun and Smoking Popes.

In a March 2018 interview on the Going Off Track podcast, Schwarzenbach confirmed that, in the summer, Jawbreaker would work on what might result in the band's first album since 1995's Dear You. He explained, "Our summer is just gonna be trying to write, jam. What we really wanna do is just riff out and see what comes. I'm spending the next month writing at home, and then we're gonna converge in San Francisco and go in a studio and see what happens." Schwarzenbach also noted the record would be more indebted to Bivouac.

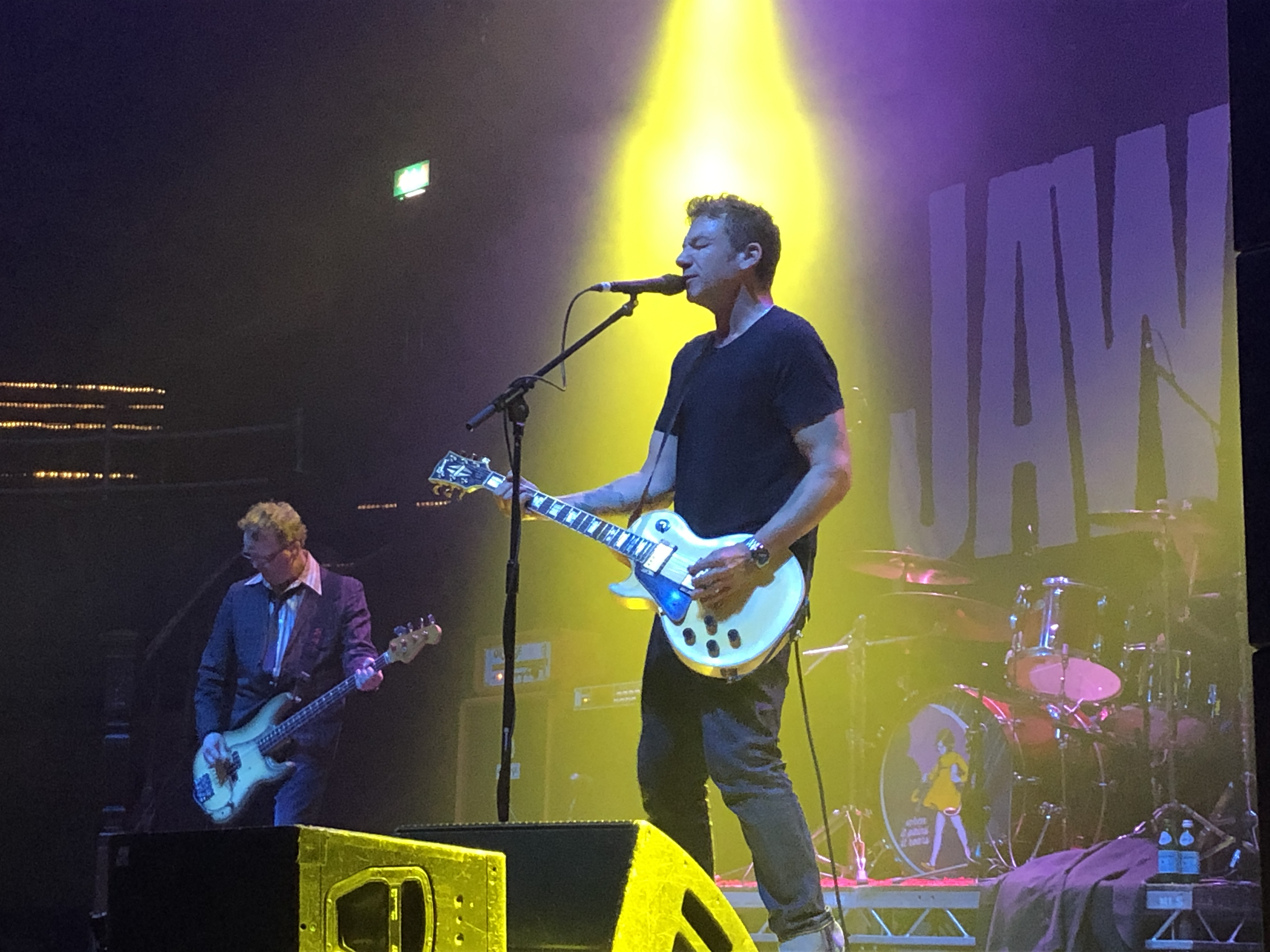
Jawbreaker performing at the Albert Hall, Manchester in 2019 Blake Schwarzenbach of Jawbreaker at The Fillmore in San Francisco in 2022.

Jawbreaker was one of the headliners of the Upstream Music Festival in Seattle on June 2, 2018 where they played "Shield Your Eyes", the first song the band ever wrote with Schwarzenbach on vocals and the opening song on Bivouac, for the first time in 22 years. The band also announced several shows in Portland, Austin, Coney Island and Asbury Park.

During a three night residency at The Fillmore in October 2018 in San Francisco, the band performed "Gemini", a song written between the release of Dear You and their break up which was never officially recorded and debuted "Black Art", a new arrangement of an unreleased song formerly by Schwarzenbach's previous band The Thorns of Life.

In January 2019, the band announced their first tour in 23 years beginning in Boston on March 22, and ending in New Jersey on March 30. The band additionally announced summer performances at Groezrock, the West Coast leg of the Warped Tour, Primavera Sound and a performance in England at London's Shepherd's Bush Empire and Manchester's Albert Hall. During the Q&A portion of a screening of their documentary "Don't Break Down" at Nitehawk Cinema in Brooklyn on March 25, the band stated that they have been toying around with an idea of putting out a new 7" in the near future, however writing has been slow as Bauermeister lives in Olympia, WA, Pfahler lives in San Francisco and Schwarzenbach resides in Brooklyn. The band embarked on their first European tour in 25 years with support on 2 dates by Beach Slang in April 2019 concluding on May 31 in Barcelona.

== Music, lyrics and influence ==
=== Musical style and influences ===
Their musical style has been primarily described as punk rock, and has been self-identified by the band's members as such. Their sound has also been labeled under the punk subgenres such as pop-punk, emo, and hardcore punk. Schwarzenbach has stated that Jawbreaker experimented with heavier punk styles in early phases of the band.

They have cited influences including Ignition, Embrace, Rites of Spring, Descendents, Bad Religion, R.E.M., the Replacements, the Pogues, Articles of Faith, Die Kreuzen, Sonic Youth (particularly their 1986 album EVOL), Minutemen, Meat Puppets, Black Flag, Bad Brains, Hüsker Dü (particularly their 1985 album New Day Rising), Social Distortion (particularly their 1982 album Mommy's Little Monster), Naked Raygun, Government Issue (particularly their 1987 album You), Live Skull, Bitch Magnet, and Led Zeppelin.

[Schwarzenbach's] appeal was his publicly private torment. There was a bitterness and frustration in his lyrics that was both universal and magnetic. Schwarzenbach was the poet laureate of scruffy white male angst and, by couching his thoughts in his own inscrutable metaphors, he set a pattern for bands that would follow for the next decade.

— Andy Greenwald

=== Lyrics and legacy ===
Many of Schwarzenbach's lyrics were rooted in his specific concerns, often lifted directly from his journal. This focus on personal, immediate matters, coupled with descriptive imagery and word choices, attracted listeners to Schwarzenbach and made him a cult idol in rock and roll circles. "The attraction then was to the songwriter," writes Greenwald in Nothing Feels Good: Punk Rock, Teenagers, and Emo, "it wasn't the song that the listeners related to, it was the singer." Jawbreaker's tour manager Christy Colcord recalls that "Most of [the fans] hovered around Blake because he was, like, this poet to them. It was all these people who really wanted their heartbreak validated by someone who could understand—or wanted to drink whiskey with them." The idolization of Schwarzenbach came to be described as the Cult of Blake. According to rock critic Chris Ryan, "In terms of contemporary music, the Cult of Blake is probably matched only by the Cult of Morrissey".

"Kiss the Bottle"
The last song recorded before Schwarzenbach's throat surgery, "Kiss the Bottle" has been cited as one of the band's definitive and most-loved songs.

Before Bivouac's release, Jawbreaker recorded the song "Kiss the Bottle" for a Mission District-themed compilation of vinyl singles titled 17 Reasons: The Mission District. It was the last song they recorded before Schwarzenbach's throat surgery, and his vocals on the recording are mottled and choked. Greenwald cites the track as "one of [Jawbreaker's] seminal and best-loved songs", calling it "sludgy and churning, a working-class anthem with a steady, proletarian heart". With lyrics profiling a pair of drunks outside a Mission District liquor store, "'Kiss the Bottle,' more than any other song, captures the sensitive boy machismo that drew (and continues to draw) male listeners to the altar of Schwarzenbach. With its fictional scrim, 'Kiss the Bottle' functions like a country song: the emotional impact is heightened by the specificity, not lessened. 'Kiss the Bottle' is Kerouac; it's Bukowski. It's the allure of giving into despair, to doing the wrong thing and at least succeeding at that." The song has been cited as a favorite and influence of Jim Ward of At the Drive-In and Sparta, and by Ron Richards, editor of the successful zine Muddle.

Jawbreaker had a sizable impact on the second wave of emo, with bands such as Saves the Day, the Get Up Kids, Braid, and Texas Is the Reason citing the band as an influence or a personal favorite. Numerous other bands and artists have cited Jawbreaker as an influence, including Explosions in the Sky, Rise Against, Dashboard Confessional, Title Fight, Eve 6, Joyce Manor, Drug Church, and Matt Skiba of Alkaline Trio.

Public interest in Jawbreaker increased in the years following their breakup, due in part to chart-toppings acts such as Fall Out Boy and My Chemical Romance publicly citing Jawbreaker as an influence. In 2003 Dying Wish Records released the tribute album Bad Scene, Everyone's Fault: Jawbreaker Tribute, featuring 18 acts including Fall Out Boy, Bayside, Face to Face, and Sparta performing cover versions of Jawbreaker songs. Jawbreaker is featured in the 2017 documentary Turn It Around: The Story of East Bay Punk.

The staff of Consequence ranked the band at number 3 on their list of "The 100 Best Pop Punk Bands" in 2019.

== Members ==
Current members

- Blake Schwarzenbach – lead vocals, guitars
- Chris Bauermeister – bass
- Adam Pfahler – drums

Touring members

- Mitch Hobbs – guitars, backing vocals

Early members

- Jon Liu – lead vocals (1987)

== Discography ==
Studio albums

- Unfun (1990)
- Bivouac (1992)
- 24 Hour Revenge Therapy (1994)
- Dear You (1995)
