= Forgetters =

American punk rock band

forgetters
- Origin: Brooklyn, New York
- Genres: Punk rock
- Years active: 2009–2013
- Labels: Too Small to Fail
- Members: Blake Schwarzenbach; Kevin Mahon; Michelle Proffit
- Past members: Caroline Paquita

Forgetters are a punk rock band from Brooklyn, New York. In August 2009, shortly after the breakup of the Thorns of Life, Blake Schwarzenbach (formerly of Jets to Brazil and Jawbreaker) announced his involvement in a new band, forgetters, with original Against Me! drummer Kevin Mahon and Caroline Paquita.

In November 2009, the Village Voice remarked that "If they wanted to, probably, forgetters... could be a 'supergroup'—drummer Kevin Mahon played in the first Against Me! lineup, and bassist Caroline Paquita was in Bitchin'—but mostly they keep a low profile". The band has been described as "a lean, rough power trio" by the Chicago Reader.

Their first recording, a self-titled double 7" featuring the songs "Vampire Lessons", "Too Small to Fail", "Not Funny", and "The Night Accelerates", was released on the band's own label, Too Small to Fail Records, on September 21, 2010. "Too Small to Fail" was a reference to the band's tour in late 2009 and early 2010 through the northeast and southeast United States. The EP was released to positive reviews; Willamette Week called it "a gorgeously drunken stumble through the East Bay's fog and smog".

In early 2011, forgetters mounted a tour of the West Coast with Street Eaters, and in April and May 2011, the band embarked on a European tour. Paquita left the band after the European tour. There were rumors that the band had broken up, but in early 2012, a photograph emerged that indicated forgetters was still recording as a duo. On November 13, 2012, the band released its debut album, produced by J. Robbins who also played the bass guitar on the record.

Following the release of their full length, the band quietly ceased operations and eventually disbanded in 2013. In 2017, Schwarzenbach reunited with Jawbreaker.

== Discography ==
- forgetters EP (Too Small to Fail, 2010)
- forgetters LP (Too Small to Fail, 2012)
