= Impact Press =

American political magazine

Impact Press was an Orlando, Florida-based magazine started in 1996 by Craig Mazer. Impact Press ran for 10 years, printing its last issue in Spring 2006. Most of the articles were political in nature and usually supported the left and far left. During its 10 years in existence, Impact Press printed 60 issues with print runs of at least 10,000 copies each. Copies of the magazine were available in over 50 cities around the United States.

In addition to the political topics, Impact also focused on animal rights issues and the environment, as well as including music reviews in a section called "Quickies". Some of the regular contributors to Impact included animal rights advocate and author Steven Best, social and political activist Paul Rogat Loeb, cartoonists Keith Knight and Stephanie McMillan, and Morris Sullivan, as well as columnists Adam Finley, Patrick Scott Barnes, Don Pflaster, and others. Additional staff included contributing editor/copy editor Stacey Matrazzo and webmaster Ben Markeson.
