= Blake Schwarzenbach =

American musician (born 1967)

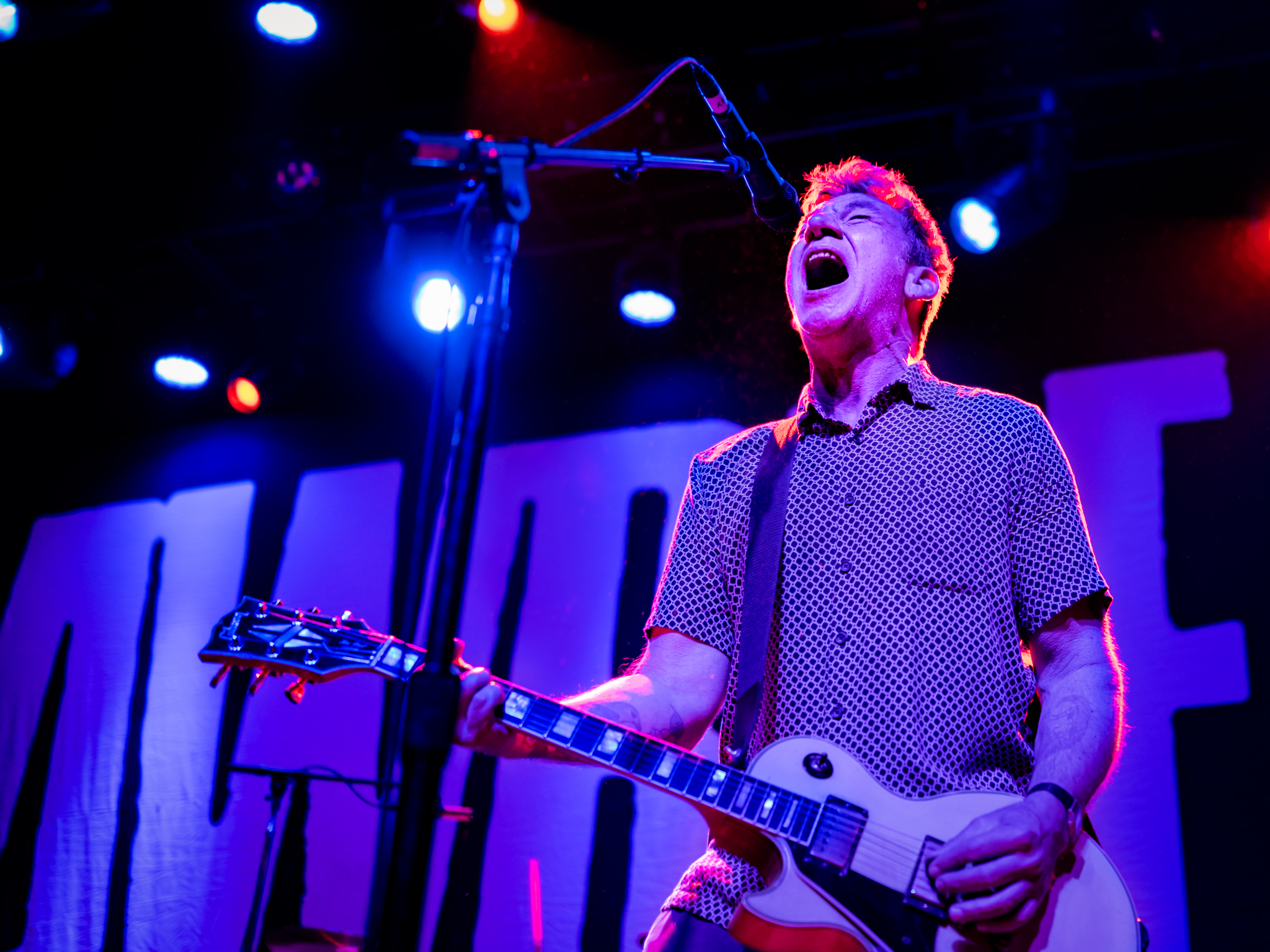
- Schwarzenbach performing with Jawbreaker in 2022

Background information
- Born: Alexander Blake Schwarzenbach; May 21, 1967 (age 59)
- Origin: Berkeley, California, United States
- Genres: Punk rock; pop punk; emo; post-hardcore; hardcore punk
- Instruments: Vocals, guitar, piano
- Years active: 1986–present
- Labels: Shredder; Tupelo/Communion; Geffen; Blackball; Jade Tree

Alexander Blake Schwarzenbach (born May 21, 1967) is an American musician. He is the singer and guitarist of the San Francisco based band Jawbreaker (1986–1996; 2017–present), and was also a member of Jets to Brazil (1997–2003), The Thorns of Life (2008–2009), and forgetters (2009–2013). Although experiencing little mainstream success himself, Schwarzenbach and groups he has been a member of have influenced a variety of musical groups.

== Early life and education ==
Schwarzenbach spent his early childhood in Berkeley, California, Portland, Oregon, and Boulder, Colorado. Upon moving to Venice, Los Angeles, California to live with his father, he attended the Crossroads School, a private K-12 school in Santa Monica, California. He then attended New York University between 1985 and 1991, including a two-quarter stint at UC Santa Cruz in 1985. He received a Bachelor of Arts degree from NYU in English literature and creative writing in 1991.

== Musical career ==
=== Jawbreaker ===
Jawbreaker formed in 1986 after Blake Schwarzenbach and drummer Adam Pfahler responded to a flyer that bassist Chris Bauermeister posted in a New York University dorm cafeteria. The band played their first show as Jawbreaker on March 16, 1989, at Club 88 in Los Angeles, CA. Jawbreaker disbanded in the summer of 1996. They had played together for ten years and released four albums. Their last show was on May 19, 1996, at the Capitol Theater in Olympia, WA.

On April 19, 2017, Jawbreaker announced that they were reuniting after a 21-year hiatus, and has since performed numerous live shows. They are also considering writing new material.

=== Jets to Brazil ===
Schwarzenbach then formed the indie band Jets to Brazil in 1997 with Jeremy Chatelain of Handsome and Chris Daly of Texas is the Reason. Jets to Brazil released three albums before disbanding after their summer tour in 2003.

=== The Thorns of life ===
In October 2008, Blake revealed that he recently started writing music for a then "as-yet-unnamed group" with drummer Aaron Cometbus (formerly of Crimpshrine) and bassist Daniel Sea, formerly of the Gr'ups and Cypher in the Snow, but best known for their recurring role on television's The L Word. The band has since been named The Thorns of Life. As of November 2008, the group has played a couple of shows in Brooklyn, with videos and reviews available online.

Blake informed via Facebook:

I can say only that it's loud and tender and we're called the Thorns of Life. whether it's more Jetsesque or Breaker-like I honestly don't know; It sounds like a storehouse of fond hatred from the last few years and in the now.

— Schwarzenbach

In early 2009, Cometbus left the band quietly. Although there has been no official announcement, many assume that The Thorns of Life are no more. Their break-up was announced on punknews.org as an official break-up.

=== forgetters ===
On August 23, 2009, Blake announced via Facebook information on his new band, forgetters.

== Musical influence ==
Schwarzenbach largely remains an influential figure in the punk/emo/indie music scene. He is known as "one of the godfathers of emo". He has a devoted following from musicians in the genre, particularly for his songs while playing in Jawbreaker, as shown by the variety of groups who paid tribute to the band on the 2003 Jawbreaker tribute album Bad Scene, Everyone's Fault. Blake was a character in the online game Emogame 2. The main character, "Blake", in Nothing Nice To Say, a webcomic, is named after him and bears a resemblance to the singer. The folk punk band Defiance, Ohio's song "I'm Just Going To Leave..." refers to listening to Jawbreaker, as does the song "I Must Be Hateful" by Lagwagon. The Get Up Kids song "I'll Catch You" refers to the Jawbreaker song "Jinx Removing". The Smoking Popes song "You Spoke To Me" is a tribute to Schwarzenbach's influence on the life of lead singer Josh Caterer. The Pootie song "What Will They Think?" has a few Jawbreaker references as well. He is also mentioned in an Eve 6 song, "Friend of Mine"; with the lyric, " remember that Blake said to 'make sure you wake and help save your generation'". "Without Eyes Still Seeing" by Rocky Votolato is another song that references Schwarzenbach in the line, "Dylan, Drake, even Schwarzenbach How you became heroes I'll never forget." Post-punk band 'Count Florida', from Scotland, released a digital single in February 2021 with an entire song devoted to him; "Blake". Alternative Punk band 'Dead You', from Los Angeles, released a song called "Jawbreaker" as a tribute to the band.

== Non-musical activities ==
=== Video game reviews ===
During the summer of 1997, Schwarzenbach worked as a freelance writer and contributed several reviews of video games for GameSpot. Games reviewed included Independence Day, HeliCOPS, and Pandemonium.

=== Politics ===
Blake was involved in some efforts of Punk Voter leading up to the 2004 U.S. presidential election. In October 2004, he wrote a "guest column" called "Empires" on Punk Voter's website. Additionally, Blake was peripherally involved with the New York University anti war protests of late 2002-early 2003. On March 27, 2003, Blake gave an antiwar speech, entitled "See How We Are", to a crowd assembled in Washington Square Park following a student walkout.

=== Writing and art ===
In 2004, Samantha Gillison commented on Blake's literary and artistic endeavors in City Pages:

...his writing has expanded beyond lyrics and liner notes. Employing Michel Foucault's theory of spontaneous and local anarchy, his artistic self-expression now includes deeply felt political essays, children's stories, and graphic representation in the form of agitprop stickers that have wound up on New York City cop cars, subway ads, Starbucks windows, and Fox News vans. And with what he calls "deep human hunger," he has delved into the world of filmmaking, starting with a Cindy Sherman-esque short entitled "Biko/Chico" that stars his cat and muse Chico Schwarzenbach.

=== Teaching ===
As of June 2022, Schwarzenbach teaches undergraduates as a member of the Adjunct Faculty in the Department of English at Hunter College, which is part of the CUNY public university system in New York City.
