= The Mr. T Experience discography =

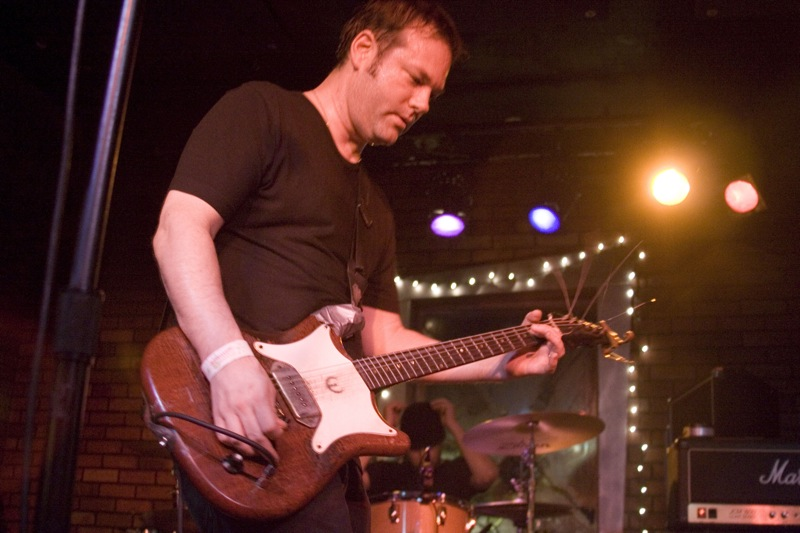
- The Mr. T Experience performing in San Francisco in January 2008.
- Studio albums: 10
- Extended plays: 5
- Singles: 9
- Reissues: 4
- Other appearances: 17

The discography of The Mr. T Experience, a Berkeley, California-based punk rock band formed in 1985, consists of ten studio albums, five EPs, and nine singles.

The Mr. T Experience formed in 1985 with an initial lineup of singer/guitarists "Dr. Frank" Portman and Jon Von Zelowitz, bassist Byron Stamatatos, and drummer Alex Laipeneiks. Their debut album Everybody's Entitled to Their Own Opinion was released in 1986 on local label Disorder Records. Night Shift at the Thrill Factory followed in 1988 through Rough Trade Records, who also released their EP Big Black Bugs Bleed Blue Blood in 1989. Stamatatos left the band and was replaced by Aaron Rubin, and when Rough Trade went out of business the band moved to Lookout! Records, where they would remain for the rest of their career. They released Making Things with Light in 1990, and both the Milk Milk Lemonade album and Strum ünd Bang, Live!? EP in 1992. Zelowitz left the band, leading to a brief breakup, but Portman, Rubin, and Laipeneiks decided to carry on as a trio and released the Gun Crazy EP and Our Bodies Our Selves album in 1993. Laipeneiks then left the band, leading to another breakup, but they reformed with new drummer Jim "Jym" Pittman for the EP ...And the Women Who Love Them in 1994. Rubin then left the group and was replaced by Joel Reader.

The lineup of Portman, Pittman, and Reader remained stable and released an album each year over a four-year period: Love is Dead (1996), Revenge is Sweet, and So Are You (1997), a cover version of the Ramones' Road to Ruin (1998), and Alcatraz (1999). Lookout! also released an expanded version of Big Black Bugs Bleed Blue Blood in 1997 with 24 additional tracks culled from the band's EPs, singles, and various compilation albums. Reader then left the band and Portman released a solo album. With new bassist Gabe Meline The Mr. T Experience released the EP The Miracle of Shame in 2000, which also included temporary Hammond organ player Erik Noyes. Meline left the band in 2002 and was replaced by "Bobby J" Jordan, while Ted Angel also joined as second guitarist. A "Special Addition" version of ...And the Women Who Love Them was released in 2002. Similar to the re-release of Big Black Bugs Bleed Blue Blood, this version included 18 additional tracks. The new four-piece Mr. T Experience lineup released Yesterday Rules in 2004.

== Studio albums ==
Year	Album details
1986	Everybody's Entitled to Their Own Opinion^{[I]}: Released: 1986; Label: Disorder (DSR #001); Format: LP
1988	Night Shift at the Thrill Factory^{[II]}: Released: 1988; Label: Rough Trade; Formats: LP
1990	Making Things with Light: Released: 1990; Label: Lookout! (LK #47); Format: LP, CS, CD
1992	Milk Milk Lemonade: Released: 1992; Label: Lookout! (LK #49); Format: LP, CS, CD
1993	Our Bodies Our Selves: Released: 1993; Label: Lookout! (LK #80); Format: LP, CS, CD
1996	Love is Dead: Released: 1996; Label: Lookout! (LK #134); Format: LP, CD
1997	Revenge is Sweet, and So Are You: Released: 1997; Label: Lookout! (LK #180); Format: CD
1998	Road to Ruin^{[III]}: Released: 1998; Label: Clearview; Format: LP
1999	Alcatraz: Released: 1999; Label: Lookout! (LK #232); Format: CD
2004	Yesterday Rules: Released: 2004; Label: Lookout! (LK #299); Format: CD
2016	King Dork Approximately: The Album: Released: 2016; Label: Sounds Rad! (RAD #002); Format: LP, CD, Digital

I Everybody's Entitled to Their Own Opinion was reissued on CD by Lookout! Records in 1990 and 1995.

II Night Shift at the Thrill Factory was re-released by Lookout! on CD in 1995 with 5 additional tracks.

III Road to Ruin is a cover version of the Ramones' 1978 album.

== Extended plays ==
Year	Album details
1989	Big Black Bugs Bleed Blue Blood^{[I]}: Released: 1989; Label: Rough Trade; Format: EP
1992	Strum ünd Bang, Live!?^{[II]}: Released: 1992; Label: Munster; Format: EP
1993	Gun Crazy: Released: 1992; Label: Lookout!; Format: EP
1994	...And the Women Who Love Them^{[III]}: Released: 1994; Label: Lookout! (LK #106); Format: EP, CD
2000	The Miracle of Shame: Released: 2000; Label: Lookout! (LK #254); Format: CD

I Big Black Bugs Bleed Blue Blood was reissued on CD by Lookout! Records in 1997 with 24 additional tracks.

II Strum ünd Bang, Live!? is out of print, however all of its tracks were included on the CD reissue of Big Black Bugs Bleed Blue Blood.

III A "Special Addition" of ...And the Women Who Love Them was released in 2002 with 18 additional tracks.

== Singles ==
Year	Release details	Tracks
1989	"So Long, Sucker": Released: 1989; Label: Lookout!; Format: 7" single	1. "So Long, Sucker"^{[I]}; 2. "Zero"^{[I]}
1990	"Sex Offender": Released: 1990; Label: Vital Music; Format: 7" single	1. "Sex Offender"^{[I]} (cover of Blondie's "X-Offender"); 2. "Last Time I Listened to You"^{[I]}
1991	"Love American Style": Released: 1991; Label: Lookout!; Format: 7" single	1. "Love American Style"^{[I]}; 2. "Somebody Wants to Love You"^{[I]}; 3. "Spider-Man"^{[I]}
1992	The Mr. T Experience / Sicko: Released: 1992^{[II]}; Label: Top Drawer; Format: 7" single	1. "Together Tonight"^{[I]}
1994	"Tapin' Up My Heart": Released: 1994; Label: Lookout!; Format: 7" single	1. "Tapin' Up My Heart"^{[III]}; 2. "My Stupid Life"^{[III]}; 3. "How'd the Date End?"^{[III]}
1995	"Alternative is Here to Stay": Released: 1995; Label: Lookout!; Format: 7" single, CD	1. "Alternative is Here to Stay"^{[III]}; 2. "New Girlfriend"^{[III]}; 3. "You Today"^{[III]} (CD version only); 4. "Alternative is Here to Stay" (alternative version) (CD version only)
1995	The Mr. T Experience / Goober Patrol: Released: 1995; Label: Punk as Duck; Format: 7" single, CD	1. "Semi-OK"^{[III]}; 2. "God Bless America"; 3. "Itching Powder in Sleeping Bags" (live) (CD version only)
1997	"...And I Will Be with You"^{[IV]}: Released: 1997; Label: Lookout!; Format: CD	1. "...And I Will Be with You"; 2. "Don't Go Breaking My Heart"^{[III]}; 3. "You Alone"^{[III]}
1999	The Mr. T Experience / Gigantor: Released: 1999; Label: G-Force; Format: 7" single	1. "King Dork"^{[III]}

I Denotes tracks that were re-released on the CD version of Big Black Bugs Bleed Blue Blood.

II The split single with Sicko was re-released in 1998.

III Denotes tracks that were re-released on the "Special Addition" of ...And the Women Who Love Them.

IV "...And I Will Be with You" is a single from the album Revenge is Sweet, and So Are You (1997).

== Reissues ==
Year	Album details
1990	Everybody's Entitled to Their Own Opinion^{[I]}: Released: 1990; Label: Lookout!; Format: CD
1995	Night Shift at the Thrill Factory: Released: 1995; Label: Lookout!; Formats: CD
1997	Big Black Bugs Bleed Blue Blood: Released: 1997; Label: Lookout!; Formats: CD
2002	...And the Women Who Love Them: Special Addition: Released: 2002; Label: Lookout!; Format: CD

I Everybody's Entitled to Their Own Opinion was reissued by Lookout! a second time in 1995.

== Other appearances ==
The following Mr. T Experience songs were released on compilation albums, soundtracks, and other releases. Some songs were later re-released on the CD version of Big Black Bugs Bleed Blue Blood, the "Special Addition" version of ...And the Women Who Love Them, and other releases, as noted below. This is not an exhaustive list: songs that were first released on the band's albums, EPs, or singles are not included.

Year	Release details	Track(s)
1988	The Thing That Ate Floyd: Released: 1988; Label: Lookout!; Format: LP	"Boredom Zone"^{[I]}
1989	Every Band Has a Shonen Knife Who Loves Them: Released: 1989; Label: Vital Music; Format: CD	"Flying Jelly Attack"^{[II]} (originally performed by Shonen Knife)
1989	Make the Collector Nerd Sweat: Released: 1989; Label: Very Small; Format: EP	"Psycho Girl"^{[II]}
1989	The Big One: Released: 1989; Label: Flipside; Format: CD	"Fill in the Blank"^{[II]}
1991	Surprise Your Pig: A Tribute to R.E.M.: Released: 1991; Label: Staplegun; Format: CD	"Can't Get There from Here"^{[II]} (originally performed by R.E.M.)
1992	Blame and Burn: Released: 1992; Label: Flush; Format: CD	"God Bless America"^{[II]}
1992	Can of Pork: Released: 1992; Label: Format: CD	"T-Shirt Commercial"^{[II]}; "Viva la France"^{[II]}
1993	Banana Pad Riot: Released: 1993; Label: Format: CD	"Don't Go Away Go Go Girl"^{[II]} (originally performed by The Banana Splits)
1993	Soda Punx: Released: 1993; Label: Top Drawer; Format: CD	"Hello Kitty Menendez"^{[II]}
1995	A Slice of Lemon: Released: 1995; Label: Lookout!/Kill Rock Stars; Format: CD	"Unpack Your Adjectives"^{[III]} (originally performed by Schoolhouse Rock!)
1997	Generations I: A Punk Look at Human Rights: Released: 1997; Label: Ark 21; Format: CD	"Yeah, Yeah, Yeah, Yeah"^{[III]}
1997	Before You Were Punk: Released: 1997; Label: Vagrant; Format: CD	"Crash"^{[III]} (originally performed by The Primitives)
1997	More Bounce to the Ounce: Released: 1997; Label: Lookout!; Format: CD	"We Are the Future People of Tomorrow"^{[III]}; "Whistle Bait"^{[III]} (originally performed by Joe Collins)
1997	The Duran Duran Tribute Album: Released: 1997; Label: Mojo; Format: CD	"Is There Something I Should Know?"^{[III]} (originally performed by Duran Duran)
1998	No Pants!: Released: 1998; Label: Let's Go; Format: CD	"Sonic Reducer" (originally performed by the Dead Boys)
1999	Forward Til Death: Released: 1999; Label: Lookout!; Format: CD	"King Dork"^{[III]}
1999	Short Music for Short People: Released: June 1, 1999; Label: Fat Wreck Chords (FAT 591-2); Format: CD	"Told You Once"

I "Boredom Zone" was reissued on the CD re-release of Night Shift at the Thrill Factory.

II Denotes tracks that were reissued on the CD re-release of Big Black Bugs Bleed Blue Blood.

III Denotes tracks that were reissued on the "Special Addition" version of ...And the Women Who Love Them.
