= E. R. Dodds =

Irish classical scholar (1893–1979)

- Dodds in 1945
- Born: Eric Robertson Dodds; 26 July 1893; Banbridge, County Down, Ireland
- Died: 8 April 1979 (aged 85); Old Marston, Oxford, England
- Occupations: Classical scholar, writer
- Title: Regius Professor of Greek
- Spouse: Annie Edwards Powell (m. 1923; died 1973)
- Parent(s): Robert and Anne Dodds
- Awards: Duff Cooper Memorial Prize for Literature

Academic background
- Education: St Andrew's College, Dublin; Campbell College; University College, Oxford

Academic work
- Institutions: Kilkenny College; University of Reading; University of Birmingham; University of Oxford
- Doctoral students: A. W. H. Adkins, Ruth Padel
- Notable works: The Greeks and the Irrational (1951); Missing Persons (1977)

Eric Robertson Dodds (26 July 1893 – 8 April 1979) was an Irish classical scholar. He was Regius Professor of Greek at the University of Oxford from 1936 to 1960.

== Early life and education ==
Dodds was born in Banbridge, County Down, the son of schoolteachers. His father Robert was from a Presbyterian family and died of alcoholism when Dodds was seven. His mother Anne was of Anglo-Irish ancestry. When Dodds was ten, he moved with his mother to Dublin, and he was educated at St Andrew's College (where his mother taught) and at Campbell College in Belfast. He was expelled from the latter for "gross, studied, and sustained insolence".

In 1912, Dodds won a scholarship to University College, Oxford to read classics, or Literae Humaniores, a two-part four-year degree program consisting of five terms' study of Latin and Greek texts followed by seven terms' study of ancient history and ancient philosophy. Friends at Oxford included Aldous Huxley and T. S. Eliot. In 1916, he was asked to leave Oxford due to his support for the Easter Rising, but he returned the following year to take his final examinations in Literae Humaniores, and was awarded a first-class degree to match the first-class awarded him in 1914 in Honour Moderations, the preliminary stage of his degree. His first tutor at Oxford was A. B. Poynton.

After graduation, Dodds returned to Dublin and met the poets W. B. Yeats and George William Russell, who published under the pseudonym "A. E.". He taught briefly at Kilkenny College and in 1919 was appointed as a lecturer in classics at the University of Reading, where in 1923 he married a lecturer in English, Annie Edwards Powell. Powell, who had also been a Fellow of the University of Liverpool, was the author of The Romantic Theory of Poetry, and prepared family friend W. H. Auden's Oxford Book of Light Verse (1938) for publication. They had no children. Powell died in 1973.

== Academic career ==
In 1924, Dodds was appointed Professor of Greek at the University of Birmingham, and came to know W. H. Auden (whose father George, Professor of Public Medicine and an amateur classicist, was a colleague). Dodds was also responsible for Louis MacNeice's appointment as a lecturer at Birmingham in 1930. He assisted MacNeice with his 1936 translation of Aeschylus's Agamemnon, and later became MacNeice's literary executor. Dodds published one volume of his own poems, Thirty-Two Poems, with a Note on Unprofessional Poetry, in 1929.

In 1936, Dodds became Regius Professor of Greek at the University of Oxford, succeeding Gilbert Murray. Murray had decisively recommended Dodds to Prime Minister Stanley Baldwin (the chair was in the gift of the Crown) and it was not a popular appointment – he was chosen over two prominent Oxford dons (Maurice Bowra of Wadham College and John Dewar Denniston of Hertford College). His lack of service in the First World War (he had worked briefly in an army hospital in Serbia but later invoked the exemption from military service granted Irish residents) and his support for Irish republicanism and socialism in addition to his scholarship on the non-standard field of Neoplatonism, also did not make him initially popular with colleagues. He was treated particularly harshly by Denys Page at whose college (Christ Church) the Regius Chair of Greek was based.

Dodds had a lifelong interest in mysticism and psychic research, being a member of the council of the Society for Psychical Research from 1927 and its president from 1961 to 1963.

His doctoral students included A. W. H. Adkins and Ruth Padel.

On his retirement in 1960, Dodds was made an Honorary Fellow of University College, Oxford, until his death in 1979. He died in the village of Old Marston, northeast of Oxford.

== Work ==
Among his works are The Greeks and the Irrational (1951), which charts the influence of irrational forces in Greek culture up to the time of Plato, and Pagan and Christian in an Age of Anxiety, a study of religious life in the period between Marcus Aurelius and Constantine I.

Dodds's scholarship on what he called the "irrational" elements of Greek mental life was significantly influenced by anthropology of J. G. Frazer (especially Psyche's Task) and Ruth Benedict's culture-pattern theories, the philosophy of Friedrich Nietzsche (esp. Beyond Good and Evil), and the psychoanalysis of Sigmund Freud and Erich Fromm. Indeed, Dodds actually first considered training as a psychoanalyst:

I think I should have done so had I been able to support myself during the long period of probation. As it was, I had to remain a dabbler and content myself with applying a little of what I had learned to the study of Greek religion.

It was this synthesis of anthropological, psychoanalytic and philosophic lenses which re-invigorated interdisciplinary conversations in Classics that had faltered ever since the controversies of the Myth-ritualists. In a similar vein, Dodds would go on to convince the ethnopsychiatrist George Devereux to teach himself Greek in order to turn his psychoanalytic lens on ancient texts (culminating in Devereux's Dreams in Greek Tragedy). Dodds delivered the Frazer Lecture at the University of Glasgow in 1969.

For a bibliography of Dodds' publications see Quaderni di Storia no. 48 (1998) 175-94 (with addenda in the same journal, no. 61, 2005), and for general information on him and studies of some of his works see the bibliography to the entry for him in The Dictionary of British Classicists (2004), vol. 1, 247–51. Add the articles on his work on Neoplatonism in Dionysius 23 (2005) 139-60 and Harvard Studies in Classical Philology 103 (2007) 499–542. See now the bibliography contained in Stray, C, Pelling, C. B. R., & Harrison, S. J. (2019), Rediscovering E. R. Dodds, Oxford.

He was also editor of three major classical texts for the Clarendon Press, Proclus: Elements of Theology, Euripides' Bacchae and Plato's Gorgias, all published with extensive commentaries, and a translation in the case of the first. His autobiography, Missing Persons, was published in 1977.

He edited Louis MacNeice's unfinished autobiography The Strings are False (1965) and MacNeice's Collected Poems (1966).

== Cultural references ==
The Berkeley, California punk band The Mr. T Experience recorded a song for their 1988 album, Night Shift at the Thrill Factory, entitled "The History of the Concept of the Soul", which is a two-minute, musical version of lead singer Frank Portman's (also known as Dr. Frank) master's thesis. Dodds' The Greeks and the Irrational is specifically referenced at the end of the song as "footnotes" (including an Ibid) sung by Portman.

== Publications ==
=== Books ===
- Select Passages Illustrative of Neoplatonism (London: S. P. C. K., 1924) (Texts for Students, 36)
- Thirty-Two Poems: With a Note on Unprofessional Poetry (London: Constable, 1929)
- Humanism and Technique in Greek Studies: A Lecture (Oxford: Clarendon Press, 1936)
- Minds in the Making (London: Macmillan & Co., 1941) (Macmillan War Pamphlets, 14)
- The Greeks and the Irrational (Berkeley: University of California Press, 1951) (Sather Classical Lectures, 25)
- Plato, Gorgias, with "revised text with introduction and commentary, by E. R. Dodds". (Oxford: Clarendon Press, 1959)
- Euripides, Bacchae, 2nd edition, "edited with introduction and commentary, by E. R. Dodds". (Oxford: Clarendon Press, 1960)
- Morals and Politics in the Oresteia (Cambridge: Cambridge Philological Society, 1960)
- Classical Teaching in an Altered Climate (London: John Murray, 1964)
- Pagan and Christian in an Age of Anxiety (Cambridge University Press, 1965) (The Wiles Lectures Given at the Queen's University, Belfast, 1963)
- Proclus, The Elements of Theology, "a revised text with translation, by E. R. Dodds". (Oxford: Clarendon Press, 1964)
- The Ancient Concept of Progress and Other Essays on Greek Literature and Belief (Oxford: Clarendon Press, 1973)
- Missing Persons: An Autobiography (Oxford: Clarendon Press, 1977)

=== Articles ===
- "Why I Do Not Believe in Survival" (London: Society for Psychical Research, 1934) (Proceedings of the Society for Psychical Research, part 135, pp. 147–172)
- "Maenadism in the Bacchae". Harvard Theological Review, 1940, 33, 115–76
- "Three notes on the Medea" (Humanitas, 1952, 4, 13–18)
- "Gilbert Murray" (Gnomon, 1957, 29, 476–9)
- "On misunderstanding the Oedipus Rex" (Greece and Rome, 1966, 13, 37–49)
- "Supernormal Phenomena in Classical Antiquity" (London: Society for Psychical Research, 1971) (Proceedings of the Society for Psychical Research, vol. 55, p. 203)

=== Other ===
- "Memoir", in Dodds, E. R., ed., Journals and Letters of Stephen MacKenna, London: Constable & Company Ltd., 1936 (Other People's Letters), pp. 1–89.

== See also ==
- Allegorical interpretations of Plato
