= ...And the Women Who Love Them =

EP by The Mr. T Experience
- Released: 1994 (re-released 2002)
- Recorded: 1994
- Genres: Punk rock, pop punk
- Label: Lookout!
- Producer: Kevin Army

The Mr. T Experience chronology
Our Bodies Our Selves (1993)	...And the Women Who Love Them (1994)	Love Is Dead (1996)

Professional ratings
Review scores
Source	Rating
Allmusic	Original release:
Allmusic	Special edition:
Pitchfork Media	(5.9/10)

...And the Women Who Love Them is an EP by the Berkeley, California punk rock band The Mr. T Experience, released in 1994 by Lookout! Records. It was the band's first release with drummer Jim "Jym" Pittman, replacing founding member Alex Laipeneiks who had left the group the previous year. It was recorded at a time when the band were very near breaking up permanently, and its release helped to creatively rejuvenate the group. Shortly after its release bassist Aaron Rubin left the band and was replaced by Joel Reader.

In 2002 ...And the Women Who Love Them was re-released as a "Special Addition" CD which includes numerous bonus tracks compiling nearly all of the band's singles, outtakes, and rare tracks from 1994 through 1997, as well as detailed liner notes explaining this span of the band's history and the recording of the songs.

== Track listing ==
All tracks are written by Dr. Frank except where noted.

No.	Title	Length
1.	"Tapin' Up My Heart"
2.	"My Stupid Life"
3.	"I Believe in You"
4.	"All My Promises"
5.	"Checkers Speech"
6.	"We Hate All the Same Things"
7.	"Now That You Are Gone"

"Special Addition" bonus tracks
No.	Title	From	Length
8.	"How'd the Date End?"	"Tapin' Up My Heart"
9.	"Alternative is Here to Stay"	"Alternative is Here to Stay"
10.	"You Today"	"Alternative is Here to Stay"
11.	"New Girlfriend"	"Alternative is Here to Stay"
12.	"Yeah, Yeah, Yeah, Yeah"	Generations I: A Punk Look at Human Rights
13.	"Unpack Your Adjectives" (George Newall; originally performed by Schoolhouse Rock!)	A Slice of Lemon
14.	"Sackcloth and Ashes" (demo)
15.	"Semi-OK" (original version)	The Mr. T Experience / Goober Patrol
16.	"Is There Something I Should Know?" (Duran Duran)	The Duran Duran Tribute Album
17.	"We Are the Future People of Tomorrow"	More Bounce to the Ounce
18.	"Whistle Bait" (Georgie Stoll, Robert Van Eps; originally performed by Larry Collins)	More Bounce to the Ounce
19.	"Crash" (Paul J. Court, Steve Dullaghan, Tracy Tracy; originally performed by The Primitives)	Before You Were Punk
20.	"Another Yesterday" (demo)
21.	"You Alone"	b-side from Revenge is Sweet, and So Are You
22.	"Don't Go Breaking My Heart" (Elton John, Bernie Taupin; originally performed by Elton John & Kiki Dee)	b-side from Revenge is Sweet, and So are You
23.	"As Life Goes on, You Get More and More Out of It"	b-side from Revenge is Sweet, and So are You
24.	"King Dork"	The Mr. T Experience / Gigantor
25.	"I Was Losing You All Along"	b-side from Revenge is Sweet, and So are You

== Performers ==
- Dr. Frank – Vocals, guitar
- Aaron Rubin – bass (tracks 1–8)
- Joel Reader – bass (tracks 8–25)
- Jim "Jym" Pittman – drums

== Album information ==
- Produced by Kevin Army
- Mastered by John Golden at John Golden Mastering
- Artwork by Chris Appelgren
