= The Miracle of Shame =

EP by the Mr. T Experience
- Released: 2000
- Recorded: 2000
- Genre: Punk rock, pop-punk
- Label: Lookout!
- Producer: Kevin Army

The Mr. T Experience chronology
Alcatraz (1999)	The Miracle of Shame (2000)	Yesterday Rules (2004)

Professional ratings
Review scores
Source	Rating
Allmusic	3/5 stars

The Miracle of Shame is an EP by the Berkeley, California punk rock band the Mr. T Experience, released in 2000 by Lookout! Records. It is the band's only release to include bassist Gabe Meline as an official member, though he had previously recorded with the band in a studio capacity on the 1999 album Alcatraz. Meline replaced bassist Joel Reader, who left the group after the recording of Alcatraz. The Miracle of Shame also includes Erik Noyes on hammond organ, who had recorded with the band on Revenge is Sweet, and So Are You and Alcatraz but had never been an official member. He joined the band officially for touring in the Summer of 1999 but did not stay with the group long.

== Track listing ==
All tracks are written by Dr. Frank.

No.	Title	Length
1.	"Spy vs. Spy"
2.	"Leave the Thinking to the Smart People"
3.	"Mr. Ramones"
4.	"Stephanies of the World Unite"
5.	"I Don't Know Where Dan Treacy Lives"

== Performers ==
- Dr. Frank - vocals, guitar
- Gabe Meline - bass
- Erik Noyes - hammond organ
- Jim "Jym" Pittman - drums

== Album information ==
- Produced, engineered, and mixed by Kevin Army
- Recorded at Sharkbite Studios, Foxhound Studios, and Peace and Conflict Studios in Oakland, California
- Mastered by John Golden
- Artwork by Chris Appelgren
