= King Dork =

2006 book by Frank Portman

- Cover of the 2006 hardcover edition, resembling a torn and doodled-in paperback edition of The Catcher in the Rye with the original title and author obscured by correction fluid.
- Author: Frank Portman
- Language: English
- Genre: Young adult fiction
- Publisher: Delacorte Press
- Publication date: April 11, 2006
- Publication place: United States
- Media type: Print
- Pages: 352
- ISBN: 0-385-73291-0
- OCLC: 60516780
- LC Class: PZ7.P8373 Ki 2006
- Followed by: Andromeda Klein

King Dork is the first novel by Frank Portman, published in 2006. A work of young adult fiction, the first-person narrative follows 14 year-old Tom Henderson during the first few months of his sophomore year of high school. Tom navigates the daily difficulties of a school filled with cruel peers and uncaring administrators, attempts to start a rock and roll band with his only close friend, negotiates the complexities of relating to girls, tries to piece together information about his deceased father through clues found in old novels, and evolves his relationship with his mother, stepfather, and sister. Titled after a 1999 song by Portman's band The Mr. T Experience, King Dork makes many references to rock bands, albums, and musicians.

The novel was named one of the Best Books for Young Adults by the American Library Association in 2007, and the filmmaking option was picked up by Gary Sanchez Productions. It was followed by Andromeda Klein (2009), which uses the same fictional setting but is set some years later and follows different characters, and by a direct sequel, King Dork Approximately (2014).

== Setting ==
Portman's novels are set in the San Francisco Bay Area in the fictitious Santa Carla County, which includes the neighboring cities and towns of Hillmont, Clearview, Clearview Heights, Salthaven, Salthaven Vista, Old Mission Hills, and Rancho Sans Souci. The events of King Dork take place between late August and early December 1999.

== Characters ==
- Tom Henderson: The 14-year-old protagonist and narrator of the story, Tom is a self-described "King Dork": "Small for my age, young for my grade, uncomfortable in most situations, nearsighted, skinny, awkward, and nervous. And no good at sports." He is a fan of rock and roll and rock music, particularly the bubblegum pop, hard rock, and heavy metal of the 1960s and 1970s. He dislikes most contemporary popular music and culture, as well as the culture and values of the baby boomer generation to which his parents and teachers belong.
- Carol Henderson-Tucci: Tom's mother is slightly eccentric and hangs onto traces of the hippie counterculture, thinking of herself as sensitive, virtuous, and free-spirited. Tom finds most of her behavior puzzling and slightly embarrassing, but loves her anyway. She has been emotionally distant since the death of Tom’s father six years before the events of the novel, and has since remarried.
- Tom Tucci: Tom's stepfather is a middle-aged hippie. Because they share the same first name, he has tried to get his stepson to call him Big Tom. The younger Tom, however, secretly refers to him as Little Big Tom on account of the elder Tom's diminutive size. Little Big Tom is fond of dispensing advice and words of encouragement to his stepchildren, much to their annoyance.
- Amanda Henderson: Tom's 12-year-old sister, Amanda, has never accepted her mother's remarriage and hopes it will quickly end in divorce. While Tom has gotten used to their stepfather's quirks, Amanda dislikes Little Big Tom intensely and frequently gives him the cold shoulder.
- Sam Hellerman: Sam is Tom's only close friend. They are both unpopular, share similar taste in music, and aspire to start a rock and roll band together. Sam has a habit of consuming alcohol and prescription medications stolen from Tom's mother.
- Mr. Teone: The oafish associate principal at Hillmont High School, Mr. Teone has the habit of addressing Tom by his last name and saluting him, which confuses Tom.

== Plot summary ==
Tom Henderson begins his sophomore year at Hillmont High School, which he describes as laughably dumbed-down and senselessly brutal, with rampant bullying by the "psychotic normal" students. Tom is derisively nicknamed "Chi-Mo", originating from an aptitude test indicating a possible career in the clergy, which his classmates associated with child molestation. His father Charles, a police detective, died six years prior in what was ruled a hit and run collision, though Tom has been given vague and contradictory details about the incident by his mother. He finds a collection of his father's books from the 1960s, including The Catcher in the Rye, a novel Tom particularly disdains, comparing its popularity among baby boomers to a cult. He begins reading the books as a way of relating to his father; in them he finds many handwritten notes, some mentioning a "tit".

Tom and his only close friend, Sam Hellerman, aspire to start a rock and roll band, though this mainly consists of proposing potential band names, pseudonyms, and album covers. At a party that Sam insists they attend, a mysterious girl calling herself Fiona makes out with Tom then abruptly leaves. Tom obsesses over her, much to Sam's annoyance. In one of his father's books Tom finds a note mentioning a "dead bastard" and signed "Tit", with ciphertext that he decodes referring to a funeral. When a bully pours soda onto Tom's father’s copy of Brighton Rock as Tom is reading it, he becomes enraged and "accidentally beats up" the bully.

To Tom's confusion, a popular girl at school begins dating one of the most unpopular boys, and Sam begins hanging out with a group of drama students. Sam eventually reveals that the girls were playing a game called "Dud Chart" in which they earned points by flirting and making out with unpopular boys, and the popular Celeste Fletcher hired him as a consultant.

Tom and Sam become more serious about their band when they are given an electric guitar and bass, respectively, by their parents. They steal amplifiers from the school and recruit drummer Todd Panchowski. When Tom's parents discover that one of his songs is about suicide, based on a self-help pamphlet, they send him to a psychiatrist, Dr. Hextrom. Tom becomes distraught when Dr. Hextrom tells him that his father committed suicide, after which his mother cancels his sessions. Meanwhile, Sam claims to have found Fiona, whose real name is Deanna Schumacher, but says she has moved away. Tom finds her, and although she is not the Fiona from the party, she makes out with him and performs fellatio on him on three occasions.

Shortly before the winter break, Tom's band performs at a Battle of the Bands at Hillmont High. His frustrations lead him to announce the band's name as the "Chi-Mos". The show is disastrous, with Todd abruptly quitting and Tom and Sam destroying the drum kit, but they make an impression on the students. Sam distributes zines containing their song lyrics, which mention assistant principal Mr. Teone in connection with sexual misconduct toward students; Mr. Teone confronts Tom about this. Tom's mother reveals that Mr. Teone had been friends and served in the Navy with Tom's father, and that his full name is Tony Isodore Teone, making him the "TIT" of Charles' notes. Tom confronts his mother about the circumstances of his father's death, but she is unable to tell him the truth.

Tom is assaulted by several bullies and winds up in the hospital with a concussion, skull fractures, and nerve injury. He learns that the Chi-Mos have become rather famous at school and that Mr. Teone has disappeared, the police having found evidence that he was running a child pornography operation involving students over the past decade. Tom is visited by Celeste Fletcher—who he realizes is Fiona and likely made out with him as part of the "Dud Chart" game, and who now gives him a handjob—and by Deanna, who again performs fellatio on him. Sam comes up with a theory connecting Mr. Teone with the death of Tom's father, but Tom is incredulous about it. The two friends continue to work on their band with their new drummer, Shinefield.

== Film adaptation ==
The film rights to the book were optioned by the Will Ferrell/Adam McKay Paramount/Vantage production company Gary Sanchez Productions in November 2006. In May 2009 Portman reported that a new deal had been reached with Sony Pictures, with Gary Sanchez still set as the production company. Seth Gordon, director of The King of Kong: A Fistful of Quarters, was originally attached to direct the film. In 2014, however, Portman stated that Miguel Arteta would be directing the film adaptation of King Dork.
