= Prediction (disambiguation) =

A prediction is a statement or claim that a particular event will occur in the future.

Prediction may also refer to:

- Prediction (film), a 1993 Russian film
- "Prediction", a song by Steel Pulse from their 1978 album Handsworth Revolution
- "The Prediction", a song by Nas from his 1999 album Nastradamus
- "The Prediction", a song by A Thorn for Every Heart from their 2004 album Things Aren't So Beautiful Now

== See also ==
- Category:Prediction
- Predictable (disambiguation)
- Predictor (disambiguation)
- Predict (disambiguation)
- Prediction interval, a statistical concept
- Explanatory power of a theory or hypothesis
- Predictive analytics
