= Big Black Bugs Bleed Blue Blood =

EP by The Mr. T Experience
- Released: 1989 (re-released 1997)
- Genre: Punk rock, pop punk
- Label: Rough Trade, Lookout!

The Mr. T Experience chronology
Night Shift at the Thrill Factory (1988)	Big Black Bugs Bleed Blue Blood (1989)	Making Things with Light (1990)

Professional ratings
Review scores
Source	Rating
Allmusic	3/5 stars

Big Black Bugs Bleed Blue Blood is an EP by the Berkeley, California punk rock band The Mr. T Experience, released in 1989 by Rough Trade Records. Lookout! Records re-released the EP as a CD in 1997 with numerous bonus tracks.

== Track listing ==
All tracks are written by Dr. Frank except where noted.

No.	Title	Length
1.	"Supersonic"
2.	"Up and Down" (Jeffrey A. Moss; cover of song from Sesame Street)
3.	"On the Team"
4.	"At Gilman Street"
5.	"Dictionary Girl"
6.	"The End of the Ramones" (Jon Von Zelowitz)
7.	"A Song About a Girl Who Went Shopping"

Bonus tracks on 1997 CD re-release
No.	Title	From	Length
8.	"Flying Jelly Attack" (Naoko Yamano; originally performed by Shonen Knife)	Every Band Has a Shonen Knife Who Loves Them
9.	"So Long, Sucker"	"So Long, Sucker"
10.	"Zero" (Zelowitz)	"So Long, Sucker"
11.	"Psycho Girl"	Make the Collector Nerd Sweat
12.	"Fill in the Blank"	The Big One
13.	"How I Made a Million in a Punk Rock Band" (Zelowitz)	b-side from Making Things With Light
14.	"Look Back and Crack"	b-side from Making Things With Light
15.	"Sex Offender" (Gary Joseph Lachman, Debbie Harry; cover of Blondie's "X-Offender")	"Sex Offender"
16.	"Last Time I Listened to You"	"Sex Offender"
17.	"Love American Style"	"Love American Style"
18.	"Somebody Wants to Love You" (Wes Farrell, Jim Cretecos, Mike Appel; originally performed by The Partridge Family)	"Love American Style"
19.	"Spider-Man" (Paul Francis Webster, J. Robert Harris)	"Love American Style"
20.	"Can't Get There from Here" (Bill Berry, Peter Buck, Mike Mills, Michael Stipe; originally performed by R.E.M.)	Surprise Your Pig: A Tribute to R.E.M.
21.	"God Bless America"	Blame and Burn
22.	"Let's Be Together Tonight"	Strum ünd Bang, Live!?
23.	"Merry Fucking Christmas" (Zelowitz)	Strum ünd Bang, Live!?
24.	"Speed Racer" (Nobuyoshi Koshibe, Yoshida Yoshiyuki; cover of Speed Racer theme)	Strum ünd Bang, Live!?
25.	"T-Shirt Commercial" (Zelowitz)	Can of Pork
26.	"Vive la France"	Can of Pork
27.	"More Than Toast"	Gun Crazy
28.	"Swallow Everything"	Gun Crazy
29.	"God Bless Lawrence Livermore"	previously unreleased
30.	"Don't Go Away Go Go Girl" (Radcliffe, Buddy Scott; originally performed by The Banana Splits)	Banana Pad Riot
31.	"Hello Kitty Menendez"	Soda Punx

== Performers ==
- Dr. Frank - vocals, guitar
- Jon Von Zelowitz - vocals, guitar
- Byron Stamatatos - bass
- Alex Laipeneiks - drums
- Eric Mead - guitar on "T-Shirt Commercial"
- Janis Tanaka - bass on "T-Shirt Commercial"
- Eban Ostby - drums on "T-Shirt Commercial"
