= Gun Crazy (disambiguation) =

Gun Crazy is a 1950 American film noir.

Gun Crazy may also refer to:

- Guncrazy, a 1992 American crime film starring Drew Barrymore
- Gun Crazy: A Woman from Nowhere, a 2002 Japanese action film, followed by two sequels
- Gun Crazy (EP), an EP by The Mr. T Experience
- "Gun Crazy", a song by White Zombe from Let Sleeping Corpses Lie
- Gun Crazy, alternate title for the 1969 British-American comedy Western film, A Talent for Loving (film)
