= Predictable =

Predictable may refer to:

- Something which shows predictability
- "Predictable" (Delta Goodrem song), 2003
- "Predictable" (Good Charlotte song), 2004
- "Predictable" (The Kinks song), 1981
- "Predictable", a song by The Mr. T Experience from their 1988 album Night Shift at the Thrill Factory
- "Predictable", a song by Avail from their 1992 album Satiate
- "Predictable", a song by Korn from their 1993 EP Neidermeyer's Mind, and the eighth song of their 1994 album Korn
- "Predictable", a song by Pete Townshend from his 1993 album Psychoderelict

== See also ==
- Prediction (disambiguation)
- Predict (disambiguation)
