= Predictor =

Predictor may refer to:

- Branch predictor, a part of many modern processors
- Kerrison Predictor, a military fire-control computer
- Predictor variable, also known as an independent variable
- A type of railway level crossing, circuit that tries to achieve a constant warning time by predicting the speed of the approaching train
- Something which makes a prediction

== See also ==
- Prediction (disambiguation)
- Predict (disambiguation)
