= A. W. H. Adkins =

British classical scholar (1929–1996)

- Born: 17 October 1929; Leicester
- Died: 13 February 1996 (aged 66); Chicago
- Spouse: Elizabeth Mary Cullingford (m. 1961)

Academic background
- Education: Merton College, Oxford
- Thesis: The Development of the Concept of Moral Responsibility from Homer to Aristotle (1957)
- Doctoral advisor: E. R. Dodds

Academic work
- Discipline: Classics
- Sub-discipline: Ancient Greek literature and ancient Greek philosophy
- Institutions: Bedford College, London; Exeter College, Oxford; University of Reading; University of Chicago
- Notable works: Merit and Responsibility: A Study in Greek Values (1960)

Arthur William Hope Adkins (17 October 1929 – 13 February 1996) was a British classical scholar, known chiefly for his work on ancient Greek moral values.

== Biography ==
The son of Archibald Arthur Adkins and Nora Hope Adkins, Adkins was born and grew up in Leicester. He studied at Merton College, Oxford, graduating BA in 1952, MA in 1955, and DPhil in 1957. His doctoral thesis, titled "The Development of the Concept of Moral Responsibility from Homer to Aristotle", was supervised by E. R. Dodds, and formed the basis for Adkins's first book Merit and Responsibility: A Study in Greek Values (1960). He held positions as an assistant lecturer at the University of Glasgow (1954–1956), as a lecturer in Greek at Bedford College, London (1956–1961), as Fellow in Classical Languages and Literature at Exeter College, Oxford (1961–1965), and as Professor of Classics at the University of Reading (1965–1974).

Having held a senior visiting fellowship at Cornell University in 1969–1970, he moved permanently to the United States upon being appointed Professor at the University of Chicago in 1974, and served as department chair from 1975 to 1980. He was named Edward Olson Professor of Classical Languages and Literatures in 1977, and held this position until his death in 1996. He also served from 1979 to 1992 as the founding chair of the Committee on the Ancient Mediterranean World (CAMW) at Chicago, now restructured as the Program in the Ancient Mediterranean World (PAMW): this was one of the first US doctoral programs to offer a specifically interdisciplinary approach to studying the ancient world.

He was honoured by the publication of a Festschrift titled The Greeks and Us: Essays in Honour of A. W. H. Adkins. This volume, which emerged from a symposium held in his honour in 1994, did not come out until some months after his death.

He died of cancer on 13 February 1996, survived by his wife Elizabeth and his children Matthew and Deborah. His papers and correspondence are kept at the University of Chicago Library.

== Selected publications ==
- Adkins, A. W. H. (1960). Merit and Responsibility: A Study in Greek Values. Oxford University Press. ISBN 9781013639555.
- Adkins, A. W. H. (1970). From the Many to the One: A Study of Personality and Views of Human Nature in the Context of Ancient Greek Society, Values and Beliefs. Constable. ISBN 9780801406041.
- Adkins, A. W. H. (1972). Moral Values and Political Behaviour in Ancient Greece: From Homer to the End of the Fifth Century. Norton & Company. ISBN 9780393008265.
- Adkins, A. W. H. (1985). Poetic Craft in the Early Greek Elegists. University of Chicago Press. ISBN 9780226007250.
- Adkins, A. W. H.; Lowrence, Joan Kalk; Ihara, Craig K., eds. (1991). Human Virtue and Human Excellence. Peter Lang. ISBN 9780820414898.
