= Show Business Is My Life =

Show Business is My Life

Studio album by Dr. Frank
- Released: 1999
- Recorded: 1998–1999
- Genre: Alternative
- Producer: Lookout Records

Show Business is My Life is a solo album by Dr. Frank, singer/songwriter for The Mr. T Experience, released in 1999. Deviating from his band's punk sound, the album incorporates folk and acoustic elements.

The cover shows Dr. Frank playing guitar against a red background.

== Track listing ==
1. "She Turned Out to be Crazy"
2. "I Made You and I Can Break You"
3. "Knock Knock (Please Let Me In)"
4. "Suicide Watch"
5. "Bitter Homes & Gardens"
6. "She All Right"
7. "Ask Beth"
8. "Population: Us"
9. "Thinking of You"
10. "I'm in Love With What's-Her-Name"
11. "Two Martinis From Now"
12. "Sad, Sad Shadow"
13. "This Isn't About You Anymore"
