= Surprise Your Pig: A Tribute to R.E.M. =

Compilation album by various artists
- Released: June 22, 1992
- Genre: Alternative rock; punk rock
- Length: 62:05
- Language: English
- Label: Staplegun

Surprise Your Pig: A Tribute to R.E.M. is a tribute album of the songs of R.E.M. released in 1992. The release has received positive reviews from critics.

== Reception ==
Professional ratings
Review scores
Source	Rating
Allmusic	3/5 stars

Editors at AllMusic rated this album 3 out of 5 stars, with critic Bradley Torreano writing that "his would serve well as an introduction to R.E.M. for those who may be too cynical to listen to it on their own, but fans of the band may feel disappointed by how far these covers stray from the originals". This compilation was shortlist in Spin's "Stolar Tracks" feature, where the covers were called "twisted, sped up, slowed down, and reshaped" to the point where "stalwarts might only recognize a few key words". In Gimme Indie Rock, Andrew Earles recommended this among a handful of compilation albums.

== Etymology ==
The album's title is derived from a conversation R.E.M. bass player Mike Mills had with the band's former manager, Jefferson Holt. Holt said, "That’s the price you pay." Mills misheard and, confused, asked, "Did you say, 'Surprise your pig?'"

== Track listing ==
All songs written by Bill Berry, Peter Buck, Mike Mills, and Michael Stipe

1. "Radio Free Europe" by Just Say No – 3:10
2. "1,000,000" by Band of Susans – 4:25
3. "Stumble" by Gumball – 6:19
4. "We Walk" by Steel Pole Bath Tub – 3:40
5. "Talk About the Passion" by Samson & The Philistines – 4:07
6. "Pretty Persuasion" by Jawbreaker – 5:35
7. "(Don't Go Back To) Rockville" by J Church – 3:40
8. "Feeling Gravitys Pull" by Phleg Camp – 3:03
9. "Cant Get There from Here" by The Mr. T Experience – 2:50
10. "Good Advices" by Flor de Mal – 3:06
11. "Bandwagon" by The Punch Line – 2:19
12. "I Believe" by When People Were Shorter and Lived Near the Water – 2:39
13. "It's the End of the World as We Know It (And I Feel Fine)" by Vic Chesnutt – 4:04
14. "Get Up" by King Missile – 2:31
15. "Losing My Religion" by Tesco Vee's Hate Police – 3:05
16. "Low" by Jawbox – 4:08
17. "Shiny Happy People" by Mitch Easter – 3:28

== Personnel ==
- Valerie Haller of Hippie House – design
- Macioce – cover photography
- Kim McLauchlan – liner notes
- David B. Morgan – engineering
- Kim Rancourt of Hippie House – design
- Darren Ressler – photography
- Jim Saah – photography

== Release history ==
Release formats for Surprise Your Pig: A Tribute to R.E.M.
Region	Date	Label	Format	Catalog
United States	1992-06-22	Staplegun	Cassette tape	SG-001-CA
United States	1992-06-22	Staplegun	Compact disc	SG-001-CD
United States	1992-06-22	Staplegun	7" LP record	SG-001-LP

== See also ==
- Drive XV: A Tribute to Automatic for the People
