= Yesterday Rules =

Studio album by the Mr. T Experience
- Released: 2004
- Genre: Punk rock, pop-punk
- Label: Lookout!
- Producer: Kevin Army

The Mr. T Experience chronology
Alcatraz (1999)	Yesterday Rules (2004)

Professional ratings
Review scores
Source	Rating
AllMusic	3/5 stars

Yesterday Rules is the tenth album by the Berkeley, California punk rock band the Mr. T Experience (whose name is abbreviated on this release as MTX), released in 2004 by Lookout! Records. It was the band's first album to include bassist Bobby J, taking the position left vacant by Gabe Meline. It was also their first album to include second guitarist Ted Angel, making it the band's first release as a quartet since 1992's Milk Milk Lemonade.

Five of the album's songs were previously recorded and released by band leader Dr. Frank in 2003 on his solo EP Eight Little Songs.

== Track listing ==
All tracks are written by Dr. Frank.

No.	Title	Length
1.	"She's Not a Flower"	2:25
2.	"Fucked Up on Life"	4:16
3.	"Oh, Just Have Some Faith in Me"	2:53
4.	"Big, Strange, Beautiful Hammer"	3:16
5.	"Sorry for Freaking Out on the Phone Last Night"	3:43
6.	"The Boyfriend Box"	2:42
7.	"London"	3:53
8.	"Elizabeth or Fight!"	2:07
9.	"Everybody Knows You're Crying"	3:36
10.	"Jill"	2:14
11.	"Shining"	2:33
12.	"Institutionalized Misogyny"	3:12
13.	"Take All the Time You Need"	3:34

== Performers ==
- Dr. Frank - vocals, guitar
- Ted Angel - guitar
- Bobby J - bass
- Jim "Jym" Pittman - drums

== Album information ==
- Produced by Kevin Army
- Engineered by Kevin Army and Mark Keaton at Sharkbite Studios
- Mastered by John Golden for John Golden Mastering
- Design and layout by Christopher Applegren
- Photography by Katy Zaug, Ruth Pittman, and others
