= Gun Crazy (EP) =

EP by the Mr. T Experience
- Released: 1993
- Recorded: 1993
- Genre: Punk rock, pop punk
- Label: Lookout!

The Mr. T Experience chronology
Strum ünd Bang, Live!? (1993)	Gun Crazy (1993)	Our Bodies Our Selves (1993)

Gun Crazy is an EP by the Berkeley, California punk rock band the Mr. T Experience, released in 1993 by Lookout! Records. It was the band's first release as a three-piece, following the departure of guitarist/vocalist and founding member Jon Von Zelowitz earlier in the year. The band had previously released the song "Together Tonight" as a four-piece on Strum ünd Bang, Live!? in 1992, but recorded a new version for this release. All three tracks were later re-recorded for the album Our Bodies Our Selves.

Gun Crazy soon went out of print because the band did not secure legal permission for use of the EP's cover photograph. However, its first two tracks were re-released on the CD version of Big Black Bugs Bleed Blue Blood.

It was rated three out of five stars by AllMusic.

== Track listing ==
All tracks are written by Dr. Frank.

No.	Title	Length
1.	"More Than Toast"
2.	"Swallow Everything"
3.	"Together Tonight"

== Performers ==
- Dr. Frank – vocals, guitar
- Aaron Rubin – bass
- Alex Laipeneiks – drums
