= Our Bodies Our Selves =

Studio album by the Mr. T Experience
- Released: 1993
- Studio: Sound and Vision Studios; San Francisco, CA; Dancing Dog Studios; Emeryville, CA; Smooth Papa's Studios; Berkeley, CA
- Genre: Punk rock, pop punk
- Label: Lookout!
- Producer: Kevin Army

The Mr. T Experience chronology
Milk Milk Lemonade (1992)	Our Bodies Our Selves (1993)	Love Is Dead (1996)

Professional ratings
Review scores
Source	Rating
AllMusic	4/5 stars

Our Bodies Our Selves is the fifth album by the Berkeley, California punk rock band the Mr. T Experience, released in 1993 by Lookout! Records. It was the band's first album as a three-piece, after the departure of founding guitarist Jon Von Zelowitz the previous year. It was also their last album with bassist Aaron Rubin and founding drummer Alex Laipeneiks. After their departures, vocalist/guitarist Dr. Frank re-formed the band with a new lineup.

The song "Even Hitler Had a Girlfriend" was used in the soundtrack to the 1996 movie Glory Daze starring Ben Affleck and was included on the film's soundtrack album, along with the song "I Just Wanna Do it With You" from the band's 1996 album Love is Dead. During the film's party scene, the main characters also perform as a band a cover of The Mr. T Experience song "Now We Are Twenty-One" from their 1988 album Night Shift at the Thrill Factory. The song “More Than Toast” was included on the soundtrack of EA Sports NCAA Football 06.

== Track listing ==
All tracks are written by Dr. Frank except where noted.

No.	Title	Length
1.	"Somebody Who Cares"
2.	"Love Manifesto"
3.	"The Dustbin of History"
4.	"Personality Seminar"
5.	"Are You There God? It's Me, Margaret"
6.	"Martyr"
7.	"Even Hitler Had a Girlfriend"
8.	"Bridge to Tarabithia"
9.	"I Feel Love" (Donna Summer, Giorgio Moroder; originally performed by Donna Summer)
10.	"More Than Toast"
11.	"Swallow Everything"
12.	"Not Guilty"
13.	"Game Over"
14.	"Will You Still Love Me When I Don't Love You?"
15.	"Together Tonight"
16.	"God Bless America"

== Personnel ==
- Dr. Frank – vocals, guitar
- Aaron Rubin – bass
- Alex Laipeneiks – drums

Technical

- Kevin Army - produced, engineer, mixing
- John Golden - mastering
- Tom Robinson - band photography
- Sergie Graphics - art
- Aaron Laipeneiks - art
