= King Dork Approximately =

2014 novel by Frank Portman

- Author: Frank Portman
- Language: English
- Published: 2014
- Publisher: Delacorte Books

King Dork Approximately is a 2014 Young Adult Novel by Frank Portman. It is a sequel to his 2006 debut novel King Dork. The paperback edition contained a link to a free download of the companion album King Dork Approximately, The Album.
