= Everybody's Entitled to Their Own Opinion =

Studio album by The Mr. T Experience
- Released: 1986 (re-released 1990 & 1995)
- Recorded: 1986
- Genre: Punk rock, pop punk
- Label: Disorder Records, Lookout!

The Mr. T Experience chronology
Everybody's Entitled to Their Own Opinion (1986)	Night Shift at the Thrill Factory (1988)

Professional ratings
Review scores
Source	Rating
AllMusic	2.5/5 stars
MusicHound Rock: The Essential Album Guide	1/5 stars

Everybody's Entitled to Their Own Opinion is the debut album by the Berkeley, California punk rock band The Mr. T Experience. It was released in 1986 by Disorder Records. The album established the band's presence in the prolific San Francisco Bay Area music scene of the late 1980s and the 1990s. Lookout! Records re-released the album in 1990 and again in 1995.

== Production ==
The album was recorded and mixed in one day.

== Critical reception ==
Trouser Press called the album "sloppy mid-tempo punk that leaves tunefulness a goal more than an actual quality." The East Bay Express wrote that it revels "in dopey pop culture."

== Track listing ==
All tracks are written by Dr. Frank except where noted.

No.	Title	Length
1.	"One Big Lie"	1:36
2.	"Just Your Way of Saying No" (Jon Von Zelowitz)	2:06
3.	"Marine Recruiter"	2:11
4.	"Sheep"	2:37
5.	"Surfin' Mozart" (Wolfgang Amadeus Mozart)	0:30
6.	"Danny Partridge"	2:48
7.	"Scientific"	2:43
8.	"Disconnection"	2:12
9.	"Surfin' Cows" (Zelowitz)	2:11
10.	"I'm in Love with Paula Pierce" (Zelowitz)	1:30
11.	"Big Mistake"	2:36
12.	"Pleasant Valley Sunday" (Gerry Goffin, Carole King; originally performed by The Monkees)	1:42
13.	"Mary Mary"	3:05
14.	"The Empty Experience"	1:43

== Performers ==
- Dr. Frank - vocals, guitar
- Jon Von Zelowitz - vocals, guitar
- Byron Stamatatos - bass
- Alex Laipeneiks - drums
