= Frank Portman =

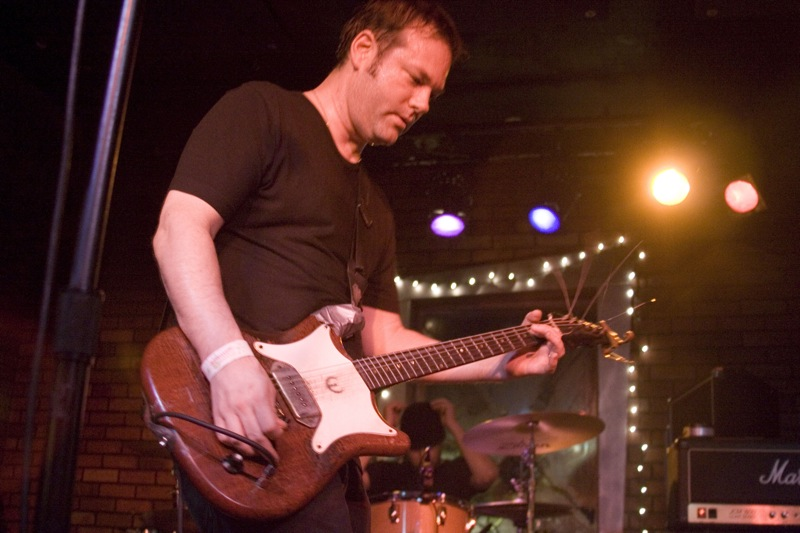
- Portman performing with The Mr. T Experience at the Bottom of the Hill in San Francisco on January 25, 2008.

Background information
- Also known as: Dr. Frank
- Born: September 21, 1964 (age 61)
- Origin: San Francisco, California
- Genres: Punk rock, pop punk
- Occupations: Singer; songwriter; guitarist; author
- Instruments: Guitar, vocals
- Years active: 1979–present
- Label: Lookout!
- Website: frankportman.com

Frank Portman (born September 21, 1964), better known by the pseudonym Dr. Frank, is an American musician, singer, guitarist, and author. He is the singer, guitarist, and primary songwriter of the Berkeley, California, punk rock band The Mr. T Experience, and has remained the only consistent member of the band since its formation in 1985, performing on ten studio albums and five EPs. He has also recorded and performed as a solo artist, releasing the album Show Business is My Life in 1999 and the EP Eight Little Songs in 2003. In recent years he has pursued a writing career in young adult literature, authoring the novels King Dork (2006), Andromeda Klein (2009), and King Dork Approximately (2014).

== Education ==
Portman attended Mills High School in Millbrae, California, in the San Francisco Bay Area. He then moved to nearby Berkeley and attended the University of California, Berkeley.

== Musical career ==
Portman's musical career began during his high school years in 1979, when he played in a band called the Bent Nails alongside future Mr. T Experience bass player Byron Stamatatos. The group was short-lived but released a song entitled "No More Riots" on the northern California punk compilation Not So Quiet on the Western Front released by Maximum Rocknroll in 1982. After high school Portman left Millbrae for UC Berkeley but kept in touch with Stamatatos. While a student there he hosted a program on campus radio station KALX which prominently featured local punk rock music, and met fellow DJ Jon Von Zelowitz. While working at the station Portman recorded a rap version of the Dr. Seuss children's poem Green Eggs and Ham. He also met Alex Laipeneiks, who had been a high school friend of Portman's younger brother John Portman. In the Summer of 1985 Portman, Zelowitz, Stamatatos, and Laipeneiks formed The Mr. T Experience. It was at this time that Portman began using the stage name "Dr. Frank," which he continues to use in his musical endeavors to this day.

The Mr. T Experience recorded their first album Everybody's Entitled to Their Own Opinion in July 1986. They began to build a local following through tours and airplay on college radio stations and quickly became part of the thriving late-1980s Bay Area punk rock movement centered around the 924 Gilman Street venue and the Lookout! Records label. At this time Portman briefly also played drums with the band Sweet Baby, but quickly returned to his main focus The Mr. T Experience, who released their second album Night Shift at the Thrill Factory in 1988. Included on the album was the song "The History of the Concept of the Soul," which was essentially Portman's college thesis condensed into an 80-second punk song. In 1990 the band signed to Lookout! Records, a label they remain on to this day and through which Portman has also released all of his other musical output.

Portman continues to be the guitarist and vocalist for The Mr. T Experience, also acting as the band's primary songwriter. Zelowitz also contributed significantly to the band's songwriting and served as a second guitarist and occasional singer until his departure from the group in 1992, after which the band essentially became Portman's project. Despite multiple lineup changes over the years, he remains the band's sole songwriter and only remaining original member. The band has released ten full-length albums, several EPs, and numerous singles over the course of their career, with nearly all material written and sung by Portman. After some solo acoustic performances he recorded a solo album entitled Show Business is My Life in 1999 and an EP, Eight Little Songs, in 2003. Many of the songs from this EP were re-recorded with The Mr. T Experience for the 2004 album Yesterday Rules, their most recent and stylistically diverse release. Portman continues to perform occasionally as a solo artist. He also occasionally plays in The Bomb Bassets with his longtime friend Dallas Denery.

Portman's musical style is generally characterized as pop punk, heavily influenced by the Ramones and other melodic rock groups. This is the style most generally associated with The Mr. T Experience. His compositions cover a variety of topics but are concerned primarily with personal relationships; he is known to introduce much of his material with the throwaway line "This is a song about a girl." Over the years his other musical tastes and interests have pushed the band to explore many styles, branching out from the Bay Area pop punk sound which he helped define. This change is evidenced on a number of solo acoustic songs interspersed between the pop punk standards on most of the band's late-1990s albums. Portman's solo recordings have further explored these other styles and influences, including country, bossa nova, Rock & Roll, and 1960s beat music.

== Writing career ==
In recent years Portman has published a blog entitled "Dr. Frank's What's-It." His young adult novel King Dork was published in April 2006. The film rights to the book were optioned by Gary Sanchez Productions that November. In May 2009 Portman reported that a new deal had been reached with Sony Pictures and that a director had been attached to the film. The Internet Movie Database lists the film as "in development".

Portman's second novel, Andromeda Klein, was published on August 25, 2009. A King Dork sequel entitled King Dork Approximately was published in 2014.

== Discography ==
=== With the Bent Nails ===
- "No More Riots" on the Maximum Rocknroll double LP compilation Not So Quiet on the Western Front (1982) – vocals, guitar

=== With The Mr. T Experience ===
Albums and EPs listed only, for a complete listing of releases see The Mr. T Experience discography.

- Everybody's Entitled to Their Own Opinion (1986) – vocals, guitar
- Night Shift at the Thrill Factory (1988) – vocals, guitar
- Big Black Bugs Bleed Blue Blood (1989) – vocals, guitar
- Making Things With Light (1990) – vocals, guitar
- Milk Milk Lemonade (1992) – vocals, guitar
- Strum ünd Bang, Live!? (1992) – vocals, guitar
- Gun Crazy (1993) – vocals, guitar
- Our Bodies Our Selves (1993) – vocals, guitar
- ...And the Women Who Love Them (1994) – vocals, guitar
- Love is Dead (1996) – vocals, guitar
- Revenge is Sweet, and So Are You (1997) – vocals, guitar
- Road to Ruin (1998) – vocals, guitar
- Alcatraz (1999) – vocals, guitar
- The Miracle of Shame (2000) – vocals, guitar
- Yesterday Rules (2004) – vocals, guitar
- King Dork Approximately, The Album (2017) - vocals guitar

=== Solo releases (as Dr. Frank) ===
- Show Business is My Life (1999) – vocals, all instrumentation
- Eight Little Songs (2003) – vocals, all instrumentation
- "Andromeda Klein" (2009) – vocals, all instrumentation
- "The Way It Sounds Like (2015) - Vocals, all instrumentation

== Bibliography ==
- King Dork (2006)
- Andromeda Klein (2009)
- King Dork Approximately (2014)

== Short stories ==
- Mark Pang and the Impossible Square (From Baseball Stories) (2008) – author

== Radio and podcast appearances ==
Portman appeared on Ken Reid's TV Guidance Counselor podcast on February 9, 2017, in an episode recorded live at SF Sketchfest.
