= Predict (disambiguation) =

Predict may refer to:

- to predict, the act of prediction
- Predict (USAID), a US government program to identify new viruses.
- PREDICT (U.S. DHS), a U.S. cybersecurity government database of the United States Department of Homeland Security
- FT Predict, a market prediction contest established by the Financial Times

== See also ==
- I Predict (1982 song) new wave song by Sparks off the album Angst in My Pants
- I Predict 1990 (1987 album), album by Steve Taylor
- Predictor (disambiguation)
- Predictable (disambiguation)
