= The Mr. T Experience =

American punk rock band

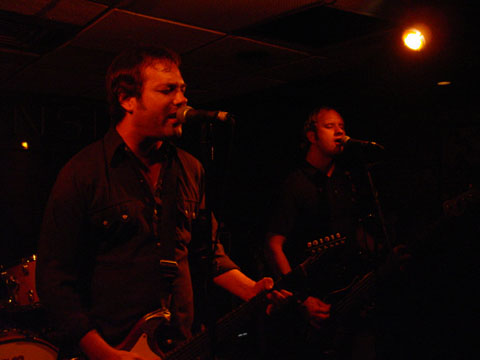
- The Mr. T Experience performing live, showing members Dr. Frank (left) and Bobby J (right).

Background information
- Origin: Berkeley, California, U.S.
- Genres: Punk rock; pop punk
- Years active: 1985–present
- Labels: Lookout!, Disorder, Rough Trade, Sounds Rad Records
- Members: Dr. Frank; Ted Angel; Bobby Jordan; Jaz Brown
- Past members: Byron Stamatatos; Jon Von Zelowitz; Aaron Rubin; Alex Laipeneiks; Joel Reader; J Phillips; Gabe Meline; Jim "Jym" Pittman

The Mr. T Experience (sometimes abbreviated MTX) is an American punk rock band formed in 1985 in Berkeley, California, United States. They have released eleven full-length albums along with numerous EPs and singles and have toured internationally. Their music is best classified as pop punk and is intentionally playful, comical, and satirical, often dealing with issues of love and relationships. The band's name is taken from actor and television personality Mr. T.

The Mr. T Experience serves mainly as the creative outlet for singer/guitarist Frank Portman, the primary songwriter and sole continuous member throughout multiple lineup changes. The band is closely associated with the Berkeley and greater San Francisco Bay Area punk rock movement of the late 1980s and the 1990s, revolving around the 924 Gilman Street venue and the Lookout! Records label, through which they have released all of their albums since 1990.

MTX are contemporaries of numerous other groups who emerged from this same scene, including Green Day, Operation Ivy, Rancid, Jawbreaker, the Donnas, Tilt, and NOFX. They also share stylistic similarities with other bands not native to the Bay area but closely associated with this movement, including the Queers, Screeching Weasel, and the Groovie Ghoulies. Over the years the Mr. T Experience has performed, toured, and shared a record label with many of these bands.

== Band history ==
=== 1985-1989: Formation ===
Prior to forming the Mr. T Experience, members Frank Portman and Byron Stamatatos had played together in a band called the Bent Nails while in high school in Millbrae, California. The two kept in touch after Portman moved to Berkeley to attend the University of California, Berkeley, where he met Jon Von Zelowitz who was a fellow DJ at the university's radio station KALX. He was also introduced to Alex Laipeneiks, who had been a high school friend of Portman's younger brother. In the summer of 1985 the four formed the Mr. T Experience with Portman on guitar and vocals (under the pseudonym Dr. Frank), Zelowitz on guitar and vocals, Stamatatos on bass, and Laipeneiks on drums.

The band's name was chosen on a whim, "a kinda accidental thing", Portman recalled in a 1995 interview:

There was kind of a concept behind it because [in 1985] Mr. T...had all these products. There was like Mr. T air fresheners, socks, cereal, deodorant, and whatever. We thought we'd be the punk rock band, just another in the long line of products. OK, not a great concept but hey... One of our records, the title was 'Too Late to Change the Name.'

The band released their first album Everybody's Entitled to Their Own Opinion in July 1986 on local label Disorder Records. They began to build a local following through small tours and airplay on college radio stations and quickly became part of the thriving late-1980s Bay Area punk rock movement centered on the 924 Gilman Street venue. A second album, Night Shift at the Thrill Factory, followed in 1988 through Rough Trade Records. It was around this time that Portman began a tradition of introducing each of the band's songs with the throwaway line "this song is about a girl..." at each of their performances. The EP Big Black Bugs Bleed Blue Blood followed in 1989, after which Stamatatos left the band and was replaced by Aaron Rubin. Rough Trade Records went out of business shortly after releasing the EP.

=== 1990-1995: Lineup changes ===
In 1990 the band signed to the fledgling local punk label Lookout! Records, which they would remain on throughout the rest of their career. They collected the results of several scattered recording sessions into the album Making Things With Light, which was the first CD album released by the Lookout! label. Milk Milk Lemonade followed in 1992, after which they embarked on their first tour of Europe. While in Spain the group recorded the EP Strum ünd Bang, Live!? Shortly after returning to America Zelowitz left the band, leading to a near-breakup. They attempted a reunion with him a few months later but elected to continue on as a trio, releasing the Gun Crazy EP in 1993. The album Our Bodies Our Selves soon followed and a tour was planned, but Laipeneiks declined to tour and soon left the band. Another near-breakup ensued as Portman considered returning to graduate school and Rubin joined Samiam.

Portman continued writing songs, however, and in 1994 Rubin returned from working with Samiam and recruited drummer Jim "Jym" Pittman. The trio recorded the EP ...And the Women Who Love Them, which instilled some creative rejuvenation to the group. Soon, however, Rubin returned to Samiam and Joel Reader joined the band as his replacement.

=== 1996-2002: Middle period ===
The lineup of Portman, Reader, and Pittman became the band's most stable lineup since 1988. From this point on the group essentially became Portman's project, as he began a prolific period of songwriting. The trio released an album each year for the next four years: Love is Dead (1996), Revenge is Sweet, and So Are You (1997), Road to Ruin (1998 - a cover of the Ramones' 1978 album of the same name), and Alcatraz (1999). Portman also released a solo album in 1999 entitled Show Business is My Life. Some songs that appear on the album Love is Dead are songs such as "Ba Ba Ba Ba Ba", "Can I Do the Thing?", and "I Fell For You".

Reader left the band after Alcatraz and joined the Plus Ones. He was replaced by Gabe Meline, who had contributed to the recording of Alcatraz. This lineup recorded the EP The Miracle of Shame in 2000, which also included organ and keyboardist Erik Noyes. Noyes was a semi-official band member who had contributed to Revenge is Sweet, and So Are You and Alcatraz and joined them officially for touring in the summer of 1999, but did not remain with them long. The band toured sporadically until 2002, when Meline left the group.

=== 2003-present: Recent activity ===
The band's lineup once again changed in 2003, with bassist "Bobby J" Jordan replacing Meline. Guitarist Ted Angel also joined, making the band a four-piece again for the first time in ten years. This lineup released the 2004 album Yesterday Rules. Limited touring followed, while Portman continued to perform occasionally as a solo artist and also in The Bomb Bassets, formed by brothers Dallas Denery of Sweet Baby and John Denery of The Hi-Fives, and producer Kevin Army on bass and Jim Pittman. Bass player Joel Reader later joined the band for their 1997 full-length record, making the entire Mr T. Experience members of the band at that point. In 1995 the band released two separately titled EP:s through Lookout Records. Please Don't Die included four songs and was released only as a vinyl 7-inch while the CD-EP Dress Rehearsal had a cover of similar style, included the same four songs and three bonus tracks not found on the vinyl. On July 29, 1997, the band released their first and only album Take a Trip with the Bomb Bassets.

The Mr. T Experience had been relatively inactive since 2005. Portman has instead focused on his writing career. He published his first novel, King Dork, in 2006. A second, Andromeda Klein, followed in 2009. King Dork Approximately, a sequel to Portman's first novel, was released in December 2014. On October 24, 2016, the Mr. T Experience released their eleventh studio album, King Dork Approximately: The Album, based on the two "King Dork" books. The album is currently only available by purchasing the latest repressing of Portman's book, King Dork Approximately, which contains a weblink to the book's official website and a digital download code for the album.

== Musical style ==
Starting in the era in which hardcore punk and speed metal dominated the underground punk rock musical scene, MTX eschewed these harder-edged trends in favor of a melodic pop-oriented approach reminiscent of the first wave of British punk — with the band likening its sound to such groups as The Damned, Buzzcocks, and Wire and such seminal American bands as the Ramones and The Dickies in a 1988 Flipside interview. Similarly, heavy political and philosophical lyrical topics were cast aside in favor of light-hearted fare, with Dr. Frank declaring:

I think deep meaning and content doesn't belong in rock'n'roll music. It just confuses things and the things that I think about, a lot of people think are very stupid, maybe.... [I]f I write a song it's going to be about the Brady Bunch or Velveeta rather than something pretentious. I think it's pretty silly when bands get big heads and big egos.

=== Music in film ===
Some of the band's music was used in the 1996 movie Glory Daze starring Ben Affleck. The film is set in Santa Cruz, California, and features music by many mid-1990s southern California punk rock bands. The Mr. T Experience songs "I Just Wanna Do it With You" and "Even Hitler Had a Girlfriend" are used in the film and appear on its accompanying soundtrack album. Also, during the film's party scene, the main characters as a band perform a cover of the Mr. T Experience song "Now We Are Twenty-One". The band's song "She's Coming (Over Tonight)" is also included in the 1998 Walt Disney Television movie My Date with the President's Daughter during the record store scene towards the beginning of the film.

== Band members ==
The Mr. T Experience lineups (only official members listed)
(1985–1989) Everybody's Entitled to Their Own Opinion Night Shift at the Thrill Factory Big Black Bugs Bleed Blue Blood	Dr. Frank - vocals, guitar; Jon Von Zelowitz - vocals, guitar; Byron Stamatatos - bass guitar; Alex Laipeneiks - drums
(1989–1992) Making Things With Light Milk Milk Lemonade Strum ünd Bang, Live!?	Dr. Frank - vocals, guitar; Jon Von Zelowitz - vocals, guitar; Aaron Rubin - bass guitar; Alex Laipeneiks - drums
(1992–1993) Gun Crazy Our Bodies Our Selves	Dr. Frank - vocals, guitar; Aaron Rubin - bass guitar; Alex Laipeneiks - drums
(1993–1995)...And the Women Who Love Them	Dr. Frank - vocals, guitar; Aaron Rubin - bass guitar; Jym Pittman - drums
(1995–1999) Love is Dead Revenge is Sweet, and So Are You Road to Ruin Alcatraz	Dr. Frank - vocals, guitar; Joel Reader - bass guitar; Jym Pittman - drums
(1999–2002) The Miracle of Shame	Dr. Frank - vocals, guitar; Gabe Meline - bass guitar; Erik Noyes - Hammond organ; Jym Pittman - drums
(2003 - 2013) Yesterday Rules	Dr. Frank - vocals, guitar; Ted Angel - guitar; Bobby Jordan - bass guitar; Jym Pittman - drums
(2013 - current) King Dork Approximately, The Album Shards Vol. 1 Shards Vol. 2 Shards Vol. 3	Dr. Frank - vocals, guitar; Ted Angel - guitar; Bobby Jordan - bass guitar; Jaz Brown - drums

Current

- "Dr. Frank" Portman – vocals, guitar
- Ted Angel – guitar, keyboards
- "Bobby J" Jordan – bass guitar, backing vocals
- Jaz Brown – drums

Past

- Byron Stamatatos – bass (1985–1989)
- Jon Von Zelowitz – vocals, guitar (1985–1992)
- Alex Laipeneiks – drums (1985–1993, died 2021)
- Aaron Rubin – bass guitar (1989–1995)
- Joel Reader – bass guitar (1995–1999)
- Jim "Jym" Pittman – drums (1994-2013)
- Gabe Meline – bass guitar (1999–2002)
- J Phillips – guitar (1998–1999)
- Erik Noyes – Hammond organ (1999–2000)
  - Noyes had acted as a studio musician with the band for several years, playing piano and organ on Revenge is Sweet, and So Are You, Alcatraz, and The Miracle of Shame. He joined the band officially for touring in the summer of 1999 but did not stay with the group long.

Timeline

== Discography ==
Studio albums

- Everybody's Entitled to Their Own Opinion (1986)
- Night Shift at the Thrill Factory (1988)
- Making Things with Light (1990)
- Milk Milk Lemonade (1992)
- Our Bodies Our Selves (1993)
- Love Is Dead (1996)
- Revenge Is Sweet, and So Are You (1997)
- Road to Ruin (1998)
- Alcatraz (1999)
- Yesterday Rules (2004)
- King Dork Approximately, The Album (2016)
- Shards Vol. 1 (2016)
- Shards Vol. 2 (2017)
- Shards Vol. 3 (2021)
