= Love Is Dead (The Mr. T Experience album) =

Studio album by The Mr. T Experience
- Released: January 19, 1996
- Recorded: 1995
- Genre: Punk rock, pop punk
- Label: Lookout!
- Producer: Kevin Army

The Mr. T Experience chronology
| Our Bodies Our Selves (1993) | Love Is Dead (1996) | Revenge is Sweet, and So Are You (1997) |

Professional ratings
Review scores
| Source | Rating |
|---|---|
| AllMusic | 4/5 stars |
| MusicHound Rock: The Essential Album Guide | 4/5 stars |
| Punknews.org | 3.5/5 stars |

Love Is Dead is an album by the Berkeley, California punk rock band The Mr. T Experience, released in 1996 by Lookout! Records. It was the band's second album as a three-piece, and the first with bassist Joel Reader and drummer Jim "Jym" Pittman, replacing Aaron Rubin and Alex Laipeneiks, respectively, who had departed the group the previous year.

The song "I Just Wanna Do it With You" was used in the soundtrack to the 1996 movie Glory Daze, and was included on the film's soundtrack album.

== Critical reception ==
Trouser Press called the release "a wonderful album," writing that "Dr. Frank and a half-new rhythm section fill Love Is Dead with nothing but loud, catchy and lovable singalongs, roaringly produced by [Kevin] Army as if he were erecting the sonic safety barrier around a particularly dangerous radioactive dumpsite." Metroactive called it "the year's can't-miss record, an addictive tome about self-loathing."

In an appreciation published in 2004, Stylus Magazine wrote that the album "is easily the finest work of the second wave of US punk, and arguably one of the finest Stateside three-chord racket albums ever dropped on wax."

== Track listing ==
All tracks are written by Dr. Frank except where noted.

| No. | Title | Length |
|---|---|---|
| 1. | "Sackcloth and Ashes" |
| 2. | "Ba Ba Ba Ba Ba" |
| 3. | "I Just Wanna Do it With You" |
| 4. | "Somebody's Song" (lyrics by Dorothy Parker) |
| 5. | "Thank You (For Not Being One of Them)" |
| 6. | "Dumb Little Band" |
| 7. | "Hangin' on to You" |
| 8. | "The Future Ain't What it Used to Be" |
| 9. | "I Fell for You" |
| 10. | "Deep Deep Down" |
| 11. | "Can I Do the Thing?" |
| 12. | "I'd Do Anything for You" |
| 13. | "Semi-OK" |
| 14. | "I'm Like Yeah, But She's All No" |
| 15. | "That Prozac Moment" |
| 16. | "You're The Only One" |

== Personnel ==
- Dr. Frank - vocals, guitar
- Joel Reader - bass
- Jim "Jym" Pittman - drums
- Paige O'Donoghue - triangle on "Can I Do the Thing?"

== Album information ==
- Produced and engineered by Kevin Army
- Mixed by Kevin Army and Bernd Burgdorf at Hyde Street Studios
- Assistant tracking engineer: Jim Ruzicka
- Additional assistant engineer: Marty Main
- Mastered by John Golden at Newbury Park, California on October 31, 1995
- Recorded at Bay Records, Emeryville Recording Company in Emeryville, California, and Smooth Hyde Street Studios
- Artwork by Christopher Appelgren, Dr. Frank, and others
- Back cover photo by Cathy Bauer
- Live photos by Brian Medley and Robyn Draheim
