= Andromeda Klein =

Book by Frank Portman

- 2009 Hardback edition
- Author: Frank Portman
- Language: English
- Genre: Young adult novel
- Publisher: Delacorte Press
- Publication date: August 25, 2009
- Publication place: United States
- Media type: Print
- Pages: 432
- ISBN: 0-385-73525-1

Andromeda Klein is Frank Portman's second young adult novel published in 2009.

The story focuses on high school occultist, Andromeda, who simultaneously tries to save her beloved local library from modernization and solve the various mysteries surrounding: her missing much-older boyfriend; the strange signs seemingly being sent to her from her recently deceased best friend Daisy; and her ever more prophetic tarot readings.

== Plot summary ==
Andromeda Klein is a teenage girl with many problems. She is unattractive, hard of hearing, her best friend and former magical partner Daisy recently died of cancer, "St. Steve" her boyfriend has gone missing, her mother is completely overbearing and her father is a paranoid conspiracist. She makes sense of the world through her complete immersion in the world of ceremonial magic and tarot, even taking on a job at her local library, which conveniently houses an impressive collection of esoteric books on just such subjects. When a list comes in, threatening to wipe the entire collection, Andromeda immediately enlists the help of all those she can find, and begins her battle with the "Friends of the Library".

Meanwhile, Andromeda begins to receive myriad messages from Daisy, beyond the grave and plies Daisy's younger brother with naked girl magazines (or "bagel worm agonies" as she mishears thanks to her partial deafness) in exchange for the remaining scraps of her dead best friend's belongings. She then uses these as part of her witchcraft in an attempt to figure out just what Daisy is trying to tell her.

Rosalie van Genuchten, and the rest of Andromeda's "afternoon tea" (alcohol and drugs) party friends, sick of her pining for St. Steve, attempt to set her up with various potential suitors who Andromeda dismisses on sight. However, in this process, she picks up Byron, a short guy with unfortunate facial hair who nevertheless becomes a kind of apprentice to Andromeda's occultism, and confidant as new, exciting, but generally confusing text messages suddenly start coming in from St. Steve.

The story gathers pace as Andromeda's tarot readings become increasingly literal and prophetic, sparking interest from fellow students, eager to know their futures, and more pressingly, who their boyfriends are cheating on them with. Andromeda's dreams start to feature a powerful new figure, called "The King of Sacramento", she begins to hear a voice in her head (that calls itself Huggy) and in a crescendo of increasingly elaborate and freaky spells, the mysteries of St. Steve, her tarot readings, and Daisy all become clear.

== Songs ==
Portman recorded two songs "Andromeda Klein" and "Bethlehem" to promote the book which were later released as a digital download and 7 inch single through Jealous Butcher Records.

== Controversy ==
Portman has reported that a planned promotional visit to a school in a Portland, Oregon area was cancelled due to "parental worries about the occult elements" in Andromeda Klein. Portman has since performed at an event related to Banned Books Week at the San Francisco Public Library.
