= Making Things with Light =

Studio album by the Mr. T Experience
- Released: 1990
- Genre: Punk rock, pop punk
- Label: Lookout!
- Producer: Kevin Army

The Mr. T Experience chronology
Big Black Bugs Bleed Blue Blood (1989)	Making Things with Light (1990)	Milk Milk Lemonade (1992)

Professional ratings
Review scores
Source	Rating
Allmusic	link

Making Things with Light is the third album by the Berkeley, California punk rock band the Mr. T Experience, released in 1990 by Lookout! Records. It was the band's first album to include bass player Aaron Rubin, replacing former bassist Byron Stomatos. The album's title refers to its cover art, which shows the four band members depicted using a Lite-Brite toy.

The album was compiled from several recording sessions the band had conducted over a two-year period, including a demo tape they had recorded in October 1989 and a studio session in June 1990. The CD version of the album includes numerous bonus tracks from three live performances, as well as a cover of the Shonen Knife song "Flying Jelly Attack" that had originally been released on the compilation Every Band Has a Shonen Knife Who Loves Them.

== Track listing ==
All tracks are written by Dr. Frank except where noted.

No.	Title	Length
1.	"What Went Wrong"	2:56
2.	"She's No Rocket Scientist"	2:21
3.	"What's in the Cuckoo Clock" (Liam Sternberg; originally performed by Rachel Sweet)	2:43
4.	"I Don't Get It"	3:57
5.	"Zero" (Jon Von Zelowitz)	2:09
6.	"Pig Latin"	1:48
7.	"Parasite"	2:32
8.	"I'm Breaking Out"	3:04
9.	"So Long, Sucker"	2:56
10.	"A Weekend in Hogboro"	1:57
11.	"Psycho Girl"	1:34
12.	"The Girl Who Still Lives at Home"	3:56
13.	"Send Me a Postcard" (Robby Van Leeuwen; originally performed by Shocking Blue)	3:08

Bonus tracks on CD version
No.	Title	Length
14.	"Untitled Spoken Word Piece" (live)	0:46
15.	"Now We Are Twenty-One" (live)	2:10
16.	"Danny Partridge Got Busted" (live)	3:20
17.	"Marine Recruiter" (live)	2:21
18.	"Slagbag" (live)	1:51
19.	"Velveeta" (live)	2:25
20.	"A Zillion Years" (live)	3:16
21.	"The History of the Concept of the Soul" (live)	1:33
22.	"Flying Jelly Attack" (Naoko Yamano; originally performed by Shonen Knife; from Every Band Has a Shonen Knife Who Loves Them)	2:38

== Performers ==
- Dr. Frank - vocals, guitar
- Jon Von Zelowitz - vocals, guitar
- Aaron Rubin - bass
- Alex Laipeneiks - drums

== Album information ==
- Record label: Lookout! Records
- Tracks 1, 4, 5, 9, 11, and 13 from an October 1989 demo tape
- Tracks 2, 3, 6–8, 10, and 12 recorded in June 1990
- Tracks 14, 15, and 17-21 recorded live at 924 Gilman Street on December 8, 1989
- Track 16 recorded live during a broadcast on 91.3 FM KTEQ at the South Dakota School of Mines and Technology (engineered by Bob Wally)
- Track 21 recorded live at Club Soda in Vancouver, British Columbia, Canada in August 1989
- Track 22 recorded November 1989 (engineered by Kevin Army)
- Produced by Kevin Army and executive produced by Lawrence Livermore
- Recorded at Sound and Vision studio in San Francisco, California
- Mixed at Dancing Dog
- Mastered by John Golden at K-Disc in Hollywood, California
- Cover art by Mitchelle Crisp
- Disc artwork by Dzuris
- Band photos by Josh Rubin and Dan Cook
- Collage artwork by Aaron Rubin
- Art direction by Jon Von Zelowitz
