= Alcatraz (album) =

Studio album by the Mr. T Experience
- Released: 1999
- Recorded: March–April 1999
- Genre: Punk rock, pop-punk
- Label: Lookout!
- Producer: Kevin Army

The Mr. T Experience chronology
Road to Ruin (1998)	Alcatraz (1999)	Yesterday Rules (2004)

Professional ratings
Review scores
Source	Rating
AllMusic	3/5 stars
Pitchfork	6.7/10

Alcatraz is an album by the Berkeley punk rock band the Mr. T Experience, released in 1999 by Lookout! Records. It was the band's last album to include bassist Joel Reader, who left the group after its release.

== Production ==
The album was produced by Kevin Army. It was recorded at multiple studios around the Bay Area, to ensure that the songs were sonically distinct. The album's sound differed from the band's previous two efforts, incorporating organ, keyboards, and acoustic instrumentation.

== Critical reception ==
The Dallas Observer deemed Alcatraz "a good, old-fashioned rock album." SF Weekly wrote: "Deliberately seeking out the sonically claustrophobic atmosphere of such '80s favorites as Elvis Costello's Armed Forces and Joe Jackson's I'm the Man, the album achieves a level of nearly paranoid musicianship, rife with extemporaneous fills and exceedingly tight instrumental interplay."

== Track listing ==
All tracks are written by Dr. Frank.

No.	Title	Length
1.	"I Wrote a Book About Rock and Roll"
2.	"Naomi"
3.	"Self-Pity"
4.	"Hey Emily"
5.	"Tomorrow is a Harsh Mistress"
6.	"Two of Us"
7.	"Our Days Are Numbered"
8.	"We're Not No One"
9.	"Re-Activate Your Heart"
10.	"Perhaps"
11.	"She's My Alcatraz"
12.	"I Feel for You"
13.	"We'll Get By"

== Personnel ==
- Dr. Frank – vocals, guitar
- Joel Reader – bass
- Jim "Jym" Pittman – drums
- Eric Noyes – hammond organ on tracks 1, 3, 8, & 10, piano on tracks 1 & 4
- Gabe Meline – hammond organ on track 13, piano on track 10, ARP on track 5
- Kevin Army – piano solo on track 4
- Paige O'Donoghue – backwards laughing on track 9
- Todd Grady – trumpet on track 2

== Album information ==
- Produced, engineered, and mixed by Kevin Army in March and April 1999
- Recorded at Foxhound Sound Studios, Roof Brothers Studios, Sharkbite Studios, and Studio 880 in Oakland, California, and at Laughing Tiger Studios in Marin County, California
- Tracks 1–12 mixed at Foxhound Sound, track 13 mixed at Roof Brothers
- Assistant engineers: Matthew Farina, Dave Simon-Baker
- Mastered by John Golden
- Photography by Jennifer Juniper Stratford
- Art by Chris Appelgren
