= Milk Milk Lemonade =

Studio album by the Mr. T Experience
- Released: 1992
- Genre: Punk rock, pop punk
- Label: Lookout!
- Producer: Kevin Army

The Mr. T Experience chronology
| Making Things with Light (1990) | Milk Milk Lemonade (1992) | Strum ünd Bang, Live!? (1992) |

Professional ratings
Review scores
| Source | Rating |
|---|---|
| AllMusic | 4/5 stars |
| MusicHound Rock: The Essential Album Guide | 3/5 stars |

Milk Milk Lemonade is the fourth album by the Berkeley, California punk rock band the Mr. T Experience, released in 1992 by Lookout! Records. It was the band's last album to include guitarist Jon Von Zelowitz, who left the group later that year.

== Critical reception ==
AllMusic wrote that the album "features a high degree of instrumental complexity, something that turned other punk rock folks off." Trouser Press wrote: "Moving a giant step forward in instrumental complexity, Milk Milk Lemonade intertwines guitars and voices with more care, skill and diversity than the band has ever previously displayed." Portland Mercury wrote that the album "remains a bona fide punk classic, and probably the band’s best-known release."

== Track listing ==
All tracks are written by Dr. Frank except where noted.

| No. | Title | Length |
|---|---|---|
| 1. | "Book of Revelation" | 2:59 |
| 2. | "What Do You Want?" | 3:10 |
| 3. | "Ready Set Go" | 2:16 |
| 4. | "Two-Minute Itch" | 2:36 |
| 5. | "There's Something Wrong with Me" | 2:04 |
| 6. | "Master of the Situation" | 4:01 |
| 7. | Untitled (untitled) | 0:10 |
| 8. | "What Difference Does It Make?" (Morrissey, Johnny Marr; originally performed by The Smiths) | 2:30 |
| 9. | "Last Time I Listened to You" | 2:00 |
| 10. | "Love American Style" | 2:47 |
| 11. | "Christine Bactine" | 2:28 |
| 12. | "I Love You, But You're Standing on My Foot" | 2:57 |
| 13. | "Makeup" | 2:37 |
| 14. | "See it Now" (actual length 3:59, rest is silence) | 9:01 |
| 15. | "secret track" | 0:15 |

== Performers ==
- Dr. Frank - vocals, guitar
- Jon Von Zelowitz - vocals, guitar
- Aaron Rubin - bass
- Alex Laipeneiks - drums

== Album information ==
- Produced, engineered, and mixed by Kevin Army
- Mastered by John Golden at K-Disc in Hollywood, California
- Cover photo by Walt Faria
- Artwork by Mark Eastman
- Band photo by Ann Giordano
- Art direction by Jon Von
