= Revenge Is Sweet, and So Are You =

Studio album by The Mr. T Experience
- Released: August 26, 1997
- Recorded: April 1997
- Genre: Punk rock, pop punk
- Label: Lookout! Records
- Producer: Kevin Army

The Mr. T Experience chronology
Love is Dead (1996)	Revenge Is Sweet, and So Are You (1997)	Road to Ruin (1998)

Professional ratings
Review scores
Source	Rating
AllMusic	3/5 stars
Punknews.org	3.5/5 stars

Revenge Is Sweet, and So Are You is an album by the Berkeley, California, punk rock band the Mr. T Experience, released in 1997.

== Critical reception ==
The Washington Post thought that the songs "show plenty of Ramones (and Buzzcocks) influence, both in their simple, speedy melodies and the bratty sense of humor." Phoenix New Times deemed the album "16 tracks of tortured love and loss" and "a more eclectic bunch of songs than on Love Is Dead."

AllMusic wrote: "Judging by the ambivalent commercial reaction to this wonderful slab of plastic, even if the MTX record the Rubber Soul of today's music era, they will nevertheless be ignored."

== Track listing ==
All tracks are written by Dr. Frank except where noted.

No.	Title	Length
1.	"Here She Comes"
2.	"She's Coming (Over Tonight)"
3.	"Love Is Dead"
4.	"Hell of Dumb"
5.	"Lawnmower of Love"
6.	"With My Looks and Your Brains"
7.	"The Weather Is Here, Wish You Were Beautiful"
8.	"Another Yesterday"
9.	"Swiss Army Girlfriend"
10.	"...And I Will Be with You"
11.	"Who Needs Happiness (I'd Rather Have You)"
12.	"When I Lost You"
13.	"I Don't Need You Now"
14.	"Our Love Will Last Forever and Ever"
15.	"Some Foggy Mountain Top" (traditional)
16.	"You You You"

== Performers ==
- Dr. Frank - vocals, guitar
- Joel Reader - bass
- Jim "Jym" Pittman - drums
- Joe Goldmark - pedal steel guitar on "Hell of Dumb"
- Erik Noyes - piano on "With My Looks and Your Brains"
- Kim Shattuck, Susan & Michael Portman, and J.D. & Samantha Smiley - backing vocals on "Love is Dead"
- Paige O'Donaghue - backing vocals on "She's Coming (Over Tonight)"

== Album information ==
- Recorded and mixed April 1997 at Toast in San Francisco, California, except "I Don't Need You Now" recorded and mixed at Foxhound Sound in Oakland, California
- Produced, engineered, and mixed by Kevin Army
- Assistant engineers: Robert Shimp, Anne Marie Scott, Jacquire King, and Angela Williams
- Mastered by John Golden at John Golden Mastering
