= Night Shift at the Thrill Factory =

Studio album by The Mr. T Experience
- Released: 1988 (re-released 1996)
- Recorded: December 1987
- Genre: Punk rock, pop punk
- Label: Rough Trade, Lookout!
- Producer: Kent Steedman

The Mr. T Experience chronology
Everybody's Entitled to Their Own Opinion (1986)	Night Shift at the Thrill Factory (1988)	Making Things with Light (1990)

Professional ratings
Review scores
Source	Rating
Allmusic	link

Night Shift at the Thrill Factory is the second album by the Berkeley, California punk rock band The Mr. T Experience, released in 1988 by Rough Trade Records. Lookout! Records re-released the album in 1996 with a number of bonus tracks.

The album continued the band's pop punk style, with some more intellectual elements beginning to appear. Songs like "Velveeta" and "The History of the Concept of the Soul" became standards in the band's live set for several years following, the latter essentially being band leader Dr. Frank's college thesis condensed into an 80-second song. The song "Now We Are Twenty-One" was featured in a scene in the 1996 movie Glory Daze starring Ben Affleck, in which the main characters perform a cover of the song as the house band at their party. The film's soundtrack also includes two of the band's mid-1990s songs, "I Just Wanna Do it With You" and "Even Hitler Had a Girlfriend."

The song "I Ain't Gonna Be History," included on the 1996 CD re-release of the album, is an outtake from the original album sessions. The other bonus songs are from an 8-track demo tape recorded by Greg Freeman at Lowdown Studios in July 1988. The song "Boredom Zone" originally appeared on the compilation The Thing That Ate Floyd, which also featured many of the band's contemporaries in the late-1980s San Francisco Bay Area punk movement.

== Track listing ==
All tracks are written by Dr. Frank except where noted.

No.	Title	Length
1.	"Now We Are Twenty-One"
2.	"Don't Know What I'll Do if You Don't"
3.	"Predictable"
4.	"A Mind is a Terrible Thing"
5.	"Skatin' Cows" (Jon Von Zelowitz)
6.	"Go Away"
7.	"What is Punk?" (Zelowitz)
8.	"The History of the Concept of the Soul"
9.	"Say Goodnight"
10.	"Velveeta"
11.	"She Did Me In" (Zelowitz)
12.	"Wearing Out"
13.	"No Milk Today" (Graham Gouldman; originally performed by Herman's Hermits)
14.	"Slagbag"
15.	"A Zillion Years"
16.	"Itching Powder in Sleeping Bags"
17.	"Dick with Ears"

Bonus tracks on 1995 CD re-release
No.	Title	Length
18.	"I Ain't Gonna Be History" (Allan Lee Shaw; originally performed by The Maniacs)
19.	"Kenny Smokes Cloves"
20.	"Time for Your Medicine" (Zelowitz)
21.	"Boredom Zone" (from The Thing That Ate Floyd)
22.	"Gilman Street"

== Personnel ==
- Dr. Frank - vocals, guitar
- Jon Von Zelowitz - vocals, guitar
- Byron Stamatatos - bass
- Alex Laipeneiks - drums

== Album information ==
- Produced by Kent Steedman
- CD re-release remixed by Kevin Army, Dr. Frank, and Jon Von Zelowitz at Hyde Street Studio D.
- Mastered by George Horn at Fantasy Studios in Berkeley, California
- Layout based on original concept by Christopher Applegren
- Disc and inlay drawing by Sergie
- Front cover photo by Michael Llewelyn
